= Old Wives for New =

1918 film

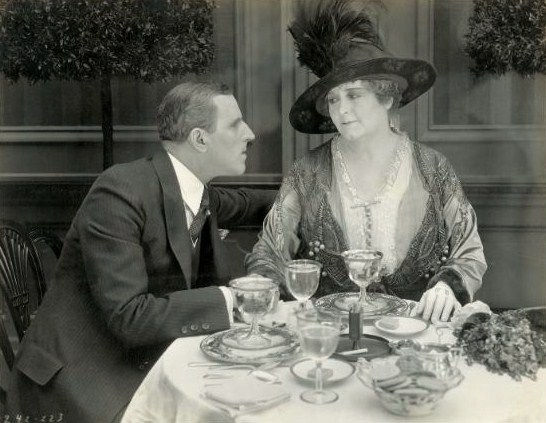
- Gustav von Seyffertitz and Sylvia Ashton in Old Wives for New
- Directed by: Cecil B. DeMille; Sam Wood (asst. director); John Browne (asst. director)
- Written by: Jeanie MacPherson
- Based on: Old Wives for New by David Graham Phillips
- Produced by: Cecil B. DeMille; Jesse L. Lasky
- Starring: Elliott Dexter İbrahim Delideniz
- Cinematography: Alvin Wyckoff
- Edited by: Cecil B. DeMille
- Production company: Famous Players–Lasky / Artcraft
- Distributed by: Paramount Pictures
- Release date: May 19, 1918
- Running time: 60 minutes
- Country: United States
- Language: Silent (English intertitles)

Old Wives for New

Old Wives for New is a 1918 American silent drama film directed by Cecil B. DeMille. It is based on the 1908 novel of the same title by David Graham Phillips.

The initial release of the film was delayed for fear that local censors would take uncommon issue with some of the themes and scenes presented in the film, most notably "that it advocates divorce as the solution of irreparable marital difficulties."

Art direction for the film was done by Wilfred Buckland and the film's costumes were designed by Alpharetta Hoffman.

== Plot ==
As described in a film magazine, disgusted by the unattractive, slovenly appearance of his wife Sophy, Charles Murdock goes on a long hunting trip. He meets Juliet Raeburn, falls in love with her, and while telling her of his love, he reveals that he is a married man. Upon his return, his wife flies into a frenzy of jealousy. To forget, he goes out with his business partner Tom Berkeley, meets Viola Hastings, who is being provided for by Berkeley, and another woman of the cafes. Viola shoots Berkeley when she finds him in another woman's bedroom and Juliet Raeburn's name is connected to the scandal by a false report. Murdock, to protect Juliet, goes abroad with another woman. After his wife obtains a divorce, Juliet and Murdock meet in Venice, renew their friendship, and marry.

== Cast ==
- Elliott Dexter as Charles Murdock
- Florence Vidor as Juliet Raeburn
- Sylvia Ashton as Sophy Murdock
- Wanda Hawley as Sophy in Prologue
- Theodore Roberts as Tom Berkeley
- Helen Jerome Eddy as Norma Murdock
- Marcia Manon as Viola Hastings
- Julia Faye as Jessie
- J. Parks Jones as Charley Murdock
- Edna Mae Cooper as Bertha
- Gustav von Seyffertitz as Melville Bladen
- Tully Marshall as Simcox
- Lillian Leighton as Maid
- Mayme Kelso as Housekeeper
- Alice Terry as Saleslady (as Alice Taafe)
- Noah Beery as Doctor (uncredited)
- William Boyd as Extra (uncredited)
- Edythe Chapman as Mrs. Berkeley (uncredited)
- Raymond Hatton as Beautician (uncredited)
- Lloyd Hughes as Reporter (uncredited)
- Charles Ogle as Bit Role (uncredited)
- Guy Oliver as Berkeley's Butler (uncredited)
- Larry Steers as Nightclub Patron (uncredited)
- Madame Sul-Te-Wan as Viola's Maid (uncredited)

== Reception ==
Despite subject matter considered particularly immoral by the public, critics praised Cecil B. DeMille for his direction and for how deftly he navigated the risks in presenting such a narrative, Jeanie MacPherson for her adaptation of the novel, and the leading actors for their performances.

Edward Weitzel, in his review for The Moving Picture World, summarizes his impressions of the story thusly:

The author has uncovered some of the ugliest sores on American social life and has treated his theme with absolute frankness. He does not attempt to excuse his characters or bring retribution on them, except in the case of [Charles Murdock]. He merely exposes the acts of certain human beings in the way the surgeon's knife lays bare the human body, and the great American bank roll seems to have the power to heal all the mental suffering of the sinning crew.

Like many American films of the time, Old Wives for New was subject to cuts by city and state film censorship boards. For example, the Chicago Board of Censors issued an Adults Only permit for the film and cut, in Reel 1, the intertitle "A shrewd sensualist" etc., Reel 3, the two intertitles "With a ribbon and a feather Berkeley pays his debts" and "Suppose he didn't get you the ermine?", the incident of Mrs. Murdock pointing to a place near her in bed, Reel 4, the intertitle "No, I can't forget, I'll take you only to your apartment", all scenes of young woman in man's arms on chair, Reel 5, all scenes of young woman in man's arms on chair, young woman shooting man and all scenes of her on floor after shooting, and the four intertitles "I killed him; he was a beast", "We've got to get him to his hotel", "Hushing it up", and "I won't turn you over to the police yet".

== Preservation ==
Complete prints of Old Wives for New are held by the Academy Film Archive and the George Eastman Museum in Rochester, New York.
