= Till I Come Back to You =

1918 film

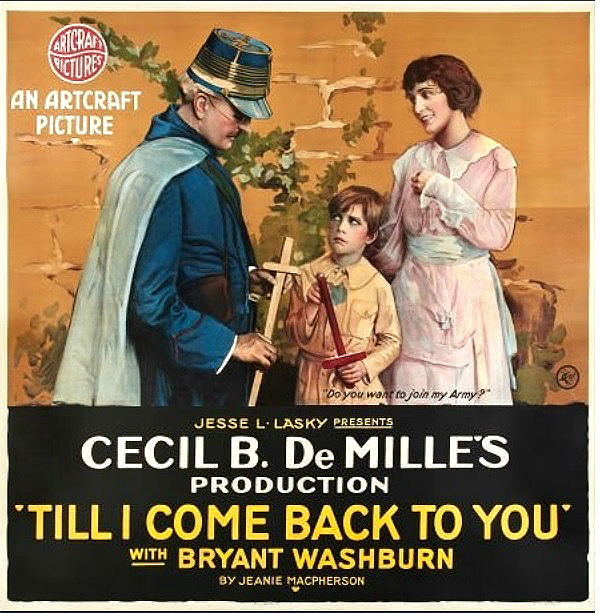
- Film poster
- Directed by: Cecil B. DeMille
- Written by: Jeanie MacPherson
- Produced by: Cecil B. DeMille; Jesse L. Lasky
- Starring: Bryant Washburn
- Cinematography: Alvin Wyckoff
- Edited by: Anne Bauchens
- Production company: Famous Players–Lasky / Artcraft
- Distributed by: Paramount Pictures / Artcraft
- Release date: August 25, 1918
- Running time: 6 reels
- Country: United States
- Language: Silent (English intertitles)

Till I Come Back to You is a 1918 American silent drama film directed by Cecil B. DeMille.

== Plot ==
As described in a film magazine, Yvonne, the wife of German officer Karl Von Drutz, is left in their Belgian home at the start of World War I. King Albert stops at the house during his retreat where he finds little Jacques playing soldier. The king tells him to be brave and wait "till I come back to you." America enters the war and Capt. Jefferson Strong is detailed to destroy the German storehouse containing their liquid fire supply. He pretends to be an escaped German soldier and hides in Yvonne's cottage, learns of the supplies, and directs the tunneling under the house. Von Drutz returns, finds Strong telephoning, and a terrific struggle ensues. Little Jacques takes a score of orphans from a nearby asylum and they escape through the tunnel. Strong saves the lives of the children but is arrested for disobedience, tried, and court martialed. Through the influence of King Albert he is saved from being shot. Yvonne, whose husband has been killed, finds consolation in Strong's love.

== Cast ==
- Bryant Washburn as Capt. Jefferson Strong
- Florence Vidor as Yvonne
- Gustav von Seyffertitz as Karl Von Drutz (as G. Butler Clonbough)
- Winter Hall as King Albert
- George Stone as Jacques
- Julia Faye as Susette
- Lillian Leighton as Margot
- Clarence Geldart as U.S. colonel
- Mae Giraci as Rosa
- C. Renfeld as Rosa's father
- William Irving as Stroheim
- Frank Butterworth as Hans
- Monte Blue as American doughboy

== Preservation ==
A complete 35 mm print of Till I Come Back to You is held by the George Eastman Museum in Rochester, New York.
