= Julia Faye =

American actress

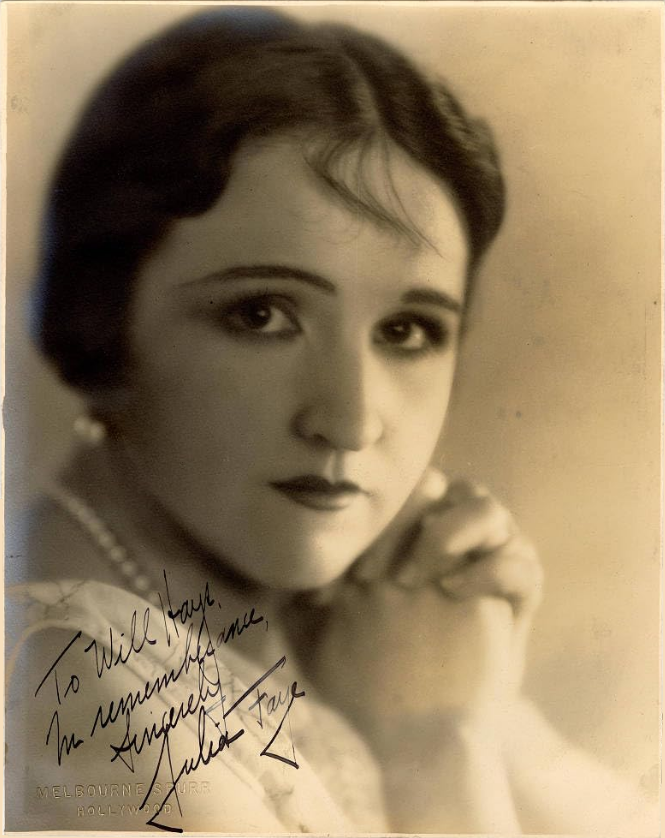
- Faye c. 1924
- Born: Julia Faye Maloney; September 24, 1892; Richmond, Virginia, U.S.
- Died: April 6, 1966 (aged 73); Pacific Palisades, Los Angeles, California, U.S.
- Resting place: Hollywood Forever Cemetery
- Other names: Julia Faye Covell; Julia Faye Wallick; Julia Faye Merrill
- Education: Illinois State University
- Occupation: Actress
- Years active: 1915–1957
- Spouses: Harold Leroy Wallick (m. 1913; died 1918) Walter Anthony Merrill (m. 1935; div. 1936)
- Partner: Cecil B. DeMille

Julia Faye Maloney (September 24, 1892 – April 6, 1966), known professionally as Julia Faye, was an American actress of silent and sound films. She was known for her appearances in more than 30 Cecil B. DeMille productions. Her various roles ranged from maids and ingénues to vamps and queens.

She was "famed throughout Hollywood for her perfect legs" until her performance in Cecil B. DeMille's The Volga Boatman (1926) established her as "one of Hollywood's popular leading ladies."

== Early life ==
Faye was born at her grandmother's home near Richmond, Virginia. Her father, Robert J. Maloney (born c. 1865), worked for the Atchison, Topeka and Santa Fe Railway. Her mother, Emma Louise Elliott (1872–1955), was from New Castle, Indiana. Her parents had married in 1890 in Newton, Kansas. Faye's paternal grandfather, Thomas Maloney, was born in Ireland and had immigrated to the United States in the 1850s.

Faye's father died sometime before 1901, when her widowed mother married Cyrus Demetrios Covell (1862–1941) in Indiana. Faye took her stepfather's name and listed him as her father. She was raised in St. Louis, Missouri, and attended public and private schools there. Faye studied at Illinois State University for a year, but her dream was to become an actress.

In 1915, she went to Hollywood to visit friends. She visited one of the film studios and was introduced to actor and director Christy Cabanne. The two reminisced about St. Louis and discovered that they had lived next door to one another there. Cabanne persuaded Faye's reluctant mother to allow her to be in motion pictures.

== Career ==
=== Triangle, Fine Arts, and Keystone (1915–1916) ===
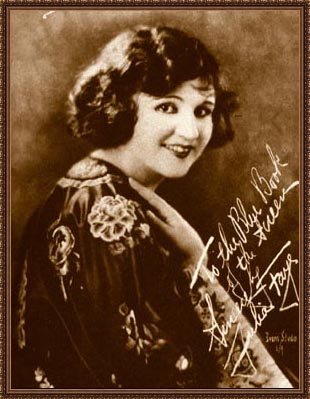
Publicity photo of Julia Faye from The Blue Book of the Screen by Ruth Wing, 1923

Faye made her debut in silent films with bit roles in Martyrs of the Alamo and The Lamb, both directed by Christy Cabanne for Triangle Film Corporation in 1915. Her first credited and important role was as Dorothea opposite DeWolf Hopper's Don Quixote in the 1915 Fine Arts adaptation of the famous Miguel de Cervantes novel. Neil G. Caward, a reviewer for the film journal Motography, wrote, in his review of Don Quixote, that "both Fay Tincher as Dulcinea and Julia Faye as Dorothea add much enjoyment to the picture." Faye's growing popularity increased with her appearances in several Keystone comedies, including A Movie Star, His Auto Ruination, His Last Laugh, Bucking Society, The Surf Girl, and A Lover's Might, all released in 1916. She also worked for D. W. Griffith, who gave her a minor role in Intolerance (1916).

=== Famous Players–Lasky (1917–1925) ===
Faye's first role for Cecil B. DeMille was featured in The Woman God Forgot (1917). She continued working for DeMille in The Whispering Chorus, Old Wives for New, The Squaw Man and Till I Come Back to You (all 1918).

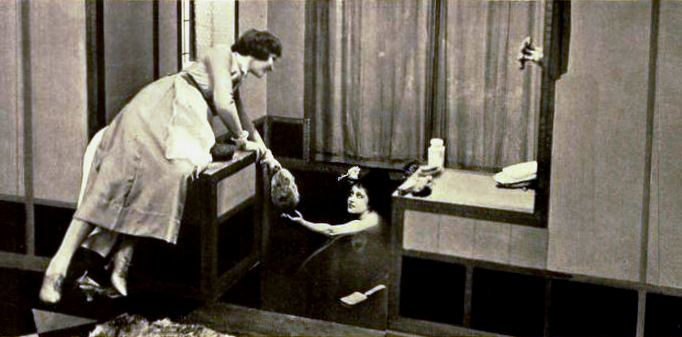
Faye as Gloria Swanson's maid in DeMille's Male and Female (1919)

In 1919, Faye played the stenographer in Stepping Out. Cast with Enid Bennett, Niles Welch, and Gertrude Claire, Faye was complimented by a critic for playing her role with "class". In DeMille's Male and Female (1919), she played Gloria Swanson's maid.

Her next film, It Pays To Advertise (1919), was a Paramount Pictures release adapted by Elmer Harris from the play of the same name by Rol Cooper Megrue and Walter Hackett. It was directed by Donald Crisp. Faye was among the actors with Lois Wilson depicting the leading lady.

Faye was listed as a member of the Paramount Stock Company School in July 1922. Its noteworthy personalities included Rudolph Valentino, Gloria Swanson, Betty Compson, Wallace Reid, Bebe Daniels, and Pola Negri.

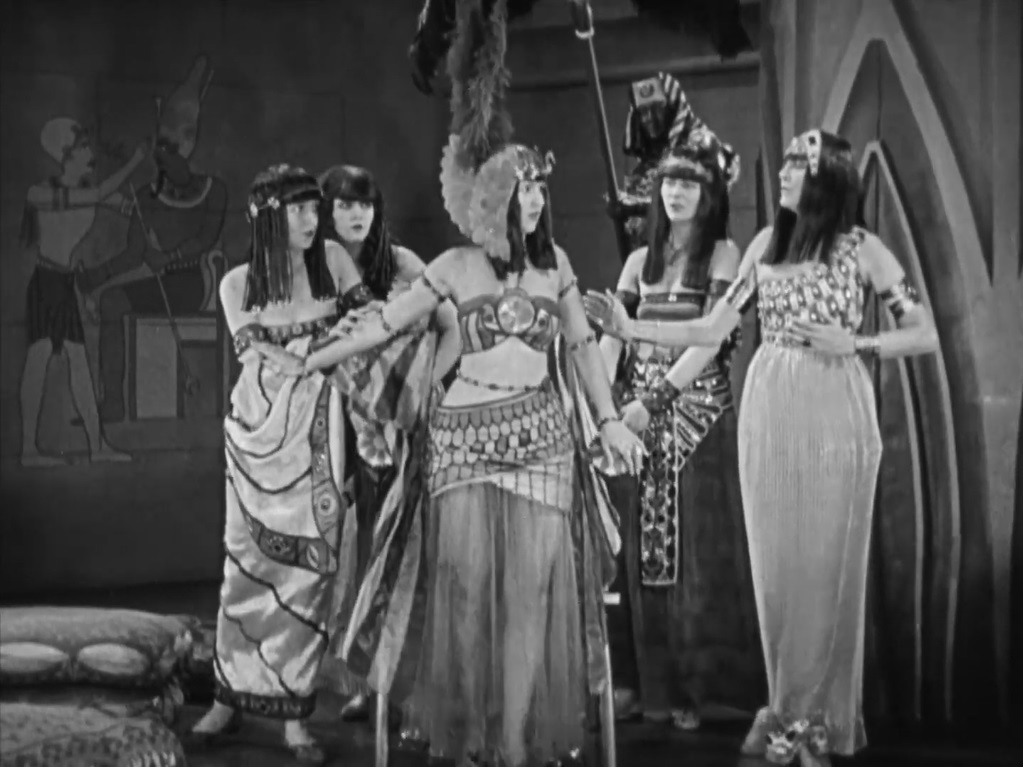
Faye (center) as the wife of Pharaoh Rameses II in The Ten Commandments (1923)

In 1923, she played The Wife of Pharaoh, one of her most famous roles, in the prologue of DeMille's The Ten Commandments.

Faye joined Raymond Griffith and ZaSu Pitts in the screen feature Changing Husbands (1924), a Leatrice Joy comedy adapted from a magazine story entitled Roles.

=== DeMille Pictures Corporation (1925–1927) ===
When DeMille resigned as director general of Famous Players–Lasky, in January 1925, he became the production head of Cinema Corporation of America. He planned to direct two or three films per year and supervise the making of between ten and twenty more. Faye came along with him as did Joy, Rod La Rocque, Florence Vidor, Mary Astor, and Vera Reynolds.

The Volga Boatman (1926) was directed by DeMille and named for the noted Russian folk song. William Boyd, Elinor Fair, and Faye have primary roles in a production DeMille called "his greatest achievement in picture making." Faye's depiction of a "tiger woman" was esteemed as the most captivating of her career to this point. Before this role she had been known for "silken siren roles". Theodore Kosloff played opposite her as a stupid blacksmith.

Faye played Martha in The King of Kings (1927). Christ, portrayed by H.B. Warner, first appears through another's perception. A blind child searches for the Lord and DeMille turns the camera gradually down to the child's eyes; his recovery of sight is shown by darkness slowly turning into blurred light, with Christ gradually coming into focus from the child's point-of-view. Thus the viewer sees Christ initially like the blind child whose sight is restored. Faye traveled to New York City for personal appearances in association with The King of Kings and to address a sales convention in Chicago, Illinois.

Faye won critical acclaim for her leading performance in the 60-minute silent comedy Turkish Delight (1927), directed by Paul Sloane for DeMille Pictures Corporation. She won the role of Empress Josephine in The Fighting Eagle (1927) after she appeared in a screen test with a new actress and the casting director chose Faye instead. She said, "It was just a stroke of luck that I was asked to help with that first test. Since I found out I had a chance to get the part, I have been fighting for it ever since. That's the only way I can get anything around here. As a result, I am always fighting with someone—usually the casting director." She was featured as Velma in the 1927 DeMille-produced film adaptation of the play Chicago; she has the distinction of being the first actress to portray Velma on-screen.

=== Sound films (1928–1957) ===
Faye had a small role as an inmate in DeMille's The Godless Girl (1929), which featured some talking sequences, but she made her "talkie" debut playing Marcia Towne in DeMille's first sound film, Dynamite (1929), co-starring Conrad Nagel, Kay Johnson, and Charles Bickford. Dynamite was also her first Metro-Goldwyn-Mayer film. In 1930, Faye said she was tired of her reputation for versatility and wanted to be typecast as a sophisticated society woman. She also appeared in two other MGM productions, the Marion Davies comedy Not So Dumb (1930) and DeMille's third and final remake of The Squaw Man (1931), before her brief retirement from films in the early 1930s. She did not appear in seven of DeMille's 1930s epics.

After a short-lived marriage, Faye returned to films with a minor role in Till We Meet Again (1936) and would go on to appear in every one of DeMille's films after Union Pacific (1939), which marked her return to DeMille films. In 1948, she celebrated her 33rd anniversary as a film actress and was signed by Paramount to play a nurse in Chicago Deadline. Faye kept track of all her screen appearances, and her role in Chicago Deadline (also known as One Woman) was her 250th film assignment. A news item noted, "In recent years her roles have been smaller, but her worth as a character actress is proved by her continuing career."

Samson and Delilah (1949) was the 35th DeMille film she appeared in; she had a prominent supporting role as Delilah's maidservant, Hisham. She also made an uncredited appearance in Sunset Boulevard (1950), as an actress on the set of DeMille's film (Samson and Delilah). In 1951, Faye informed Hedda Hopper about her part in DeMille's The Greatest Show on Earth: "I play a wardrobe mistress. It's a wonderful role of an ex-circus performer who has become too old and too fat. I'm going to try for high comedy." In DeMille's 1956 version of The Ten Commandments, she played Elisheba, Aaron's wife. Her last role was as a dowager in the 1958 remake of DeMille's The Buccaneer, produced by DeMille himself but directed by his son-in-law Anthony Quinn.

== Personal life ==
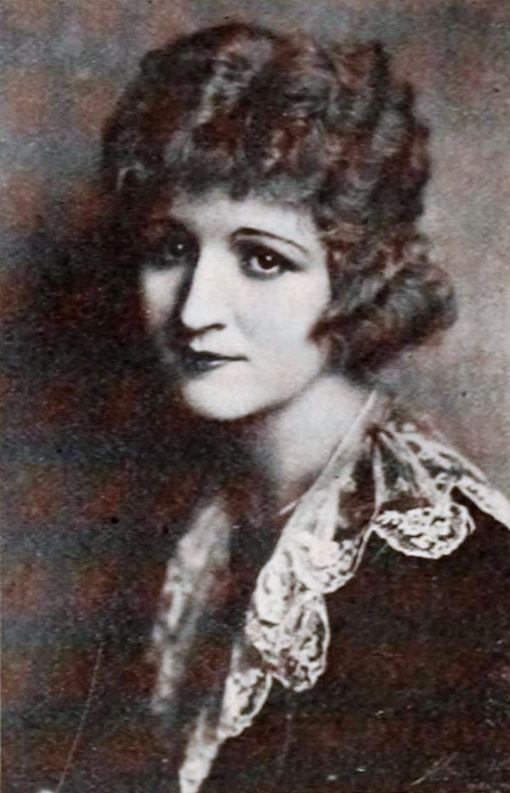
Faye in a 1920 photograph

Faye married Harold Leroy Wallick on August 2, 1913, in Manhattan. Wallick predeceased her, and she is listed as a widow in the 1930 census.

In 1920, Faye resided at 2450 Glendower Avenue in Los Feliz. She later bought a Colonial Revival-style mansion at 2338 Observatory Avenue, also in Los Feliz.

After retiring from films for a few years, Faye married playwright and screenwriter Walter Anthony Merrill on October 24, 1935, at the Little Church of the Flowers in Glendale, California. The couple first met when they were introduced to each other by their matron of honor, Grace Tibbett, the wife of opera singer Lawrence Tibbett. DeMille was present at the wedding ceremony and gave Faye away. In April 1936, Faye announced that she had obtained a Nevada divorce from Merrill on April 3. She cited incompatibility as the reason for the divorce, which Merrill did not contest. Both confirmed that they separated ten days after the wedding, and Faye said, "We were just unable to make a go of it. We felt terribly because we had to separate, but we did so with no ill feeling toward each other."

Faye began writing a memoir, Flicker Faces, in the mid-1940s. Hollywood gossip columnist Hedda Hopper said, "If she tells all, it will sell like hot cakes." Although it remains unpublished, some excerpts from the memoir are included in two Cecil B. DeMille biographies: Scott Eyman's Empire of Dreams: The Epic Life of Cecil B. DeMille (2010) and John Kobal's The Lost World of DeMille (2019).

=== Relationship with Cecil B. DeMille ===
Faye first met Cecil B. DeMille in 1917 and she became one of his mistresses. According to Faye, DeMille saw her on a film set among a group of other actresses and she informed him that she would like to be a writer. She later wrote, "He told me to bring him an idea [for a story …] Every line of that conversation is indelibly written in my memory. I shall never forget the thrill of it! It started a friendship that has lasted over thirty years." DeMille promised Faye a role in his next film but also told her that she would never become a star because she did not have "the right kind of personality"; he described her as the "'cute' type" or "soubrette" and thought her face was too round and her nose too long. DeMille originally wanted to train Faye as a screenwriter, but these plans never came to fruition.

In his 1959 autobiography, DeMille wrote:

Julia Faye is still one of my best workmen and closest friends. She has been in almost every one of my pictures since 1917. Ordinarily I might consider it ungallant to refer to the calendar in the presence of a lady, but Julia Faye is truly one of those to whom the calendar is absolutely meaningless. Her hair is gray now, but she sparkles with the same bright vivacity that impressed me when Wallace Reid introduced her to me in 1917. Julia still impresses people the same way. […] Calendars become obsolete. Julia doesn't.

== Death ==
Faye died of cancer at her home in Pacific Palisades, Los Angeles, on April 6, 1966, at the age of 73. Her cremated remains rest in the Colonnade at Hollywood Forever Cemetery.

== Legacy ==
For her contributions to the American film industry, Faye was awarded a star on the Hollywood Walk of Fame at 6500 Hollywood Boulevard. Her memoir, preserved in The Cecil B. DeMille Archives at Brigham Young University, has yet to be published.

== Partial filmography ==
- The Lamb (1915) in a minor role (uncredited)
- Don Quixote (1915) as Dorothea
- Intolerance (1916) in a bit role (uncredited)
- A Roadside Impresario (1917) as Adelaide Vandergrift
- The Woman God Forgot (1917) as Tecza's handmaiden
- The Whispering Chorus (1918) as Girl in Shanghai Dive (uncredited)
- Old Wives for New (1918) as Jessie
- Sandy (1918) as Annette Fenton
- Till I Come Back to You (1918) as Susette
- Mrs. Leffingwell's Boots (1918) as Mabel Brown
- The Squaw Man (1918) as Lady Mabel
- Venus in the East (1919) as Doric Blint
- Don't Change Your Husband (1919) as Nanette aka Toodles
- A Very Good Young Man (1919) as Kitty Douglas
- Stepping Out (1919) as The Secretary
- Male and Female (1919) as Susan – Maid #2
- It Pays to Advertise (1919) as Countess de Beaurien
- The Six Best Cellars (1920) as Mrs. Jordan
- Why Change Your Wife? (1920) as Girl in Bathing Suit (uncredited)
- Something to Think About (1920) as Alice Blair – Banker's Daughter
- Life of the Party (1920) as 'French' Kate
- Forbidden Fruit (1921) as Mrs. Mallory's First Maid
- The Snob (1921) as Betty Welland
- The Great Moment (1921) as Sadi Bronson
- The Affairs of Anatol (1921) as Tibra (uncredited)
- Fool's Paradise (1921) as Samaran, His Chief Wife
- A Trip to Paramountown (1922, Short) as herself
- Saturday Night (1922) as Elsie Prentiss
- Nice People (1922) as Hallie Livingston
- Manslaughter (1922) as Mrs. Drummond
- Nobody's Money (1923) as Annette
- Adam's Rib (1923) as The Mischievous One
- The Ten Commandments (1923) as The Wife of Pharaoh – Prologue
- Don't Call It Love (1923) as Clara Proctor
- Hollywood (1923) as herself
- Triumph (1924) as Countess Rika
- The Breaking Point (1924) as Gossipy Patient (uncredited)
- Changing Husbands (1924) as Mitzi
- Feet of Clay (1924) as Bertha Lansell
- The Golden Bed (1925) as Nell Thompson
- Hell's Highroad (1925) as Anne Broderick
- The Road to Yesterday (1925) as Dolly Foules
- The Volga Boatman (1926) as Mariusha, a Gypsy
- Bachelor Brides (1926) as Pansy Short
- Meet the Prince (1926) as Princess Sophia Alexnov
- Corporal Kate (1926) as Becky Finkelstein
- The Yankee Clipper (1927) as Queen Victoria
- The King of Kings (1927) as Martha
- His Dog (1927) as Dorcas
- The Fighting Eagle (1927) as Josephine
- The Main Event (1927) as Margie
- Turkish Delight (1927) as Zelma
- Chicago (1927) as Velma
- The Godless Girl (1929) as Inmate #1
- Dynamite (1929) as Marcia Towne
- Not So Dumb (1930) as Mrs. Forbes
- The Squaw Man (1931) as Mrs. Chichester Jones
- Only Yesterday (1933) (uncredited)
- Till We Meet Again (1936) as Nurse
- You and Me (1938) as Secretary
- Union Pacific (1939) as Mame
- The Spellbinder (1939) as Courtroom Extra (uncredited)
- Remember the Night (1940) as Jury Member (uncredited)
- Northwest Mounted Police (1940) as Wapiskau
- Pacific Blackout (1941) as Dance Club Woman (uncredited)
- Reap the Wild Wind (1942) as Charleston Lady
- Holiday Inn (1942) as Guest at Inn (uncredited)
- So Proudly We Hail! (1943) as Nurse (uncredited)
- The Story of Dr. Wassell (1944) as Anne, the Nurse (uncredited)
- Casanova Brown (1944) as X-Ray Nurse (uncredited)
- Masquerade in Mexico (1945) as Party Guest (uncredited)
- To Each His Own (1946) (uncredited)
- California (1947) as Wagon Woman
- Easy Come, Easy Go (1947) as Neighbor (uncredited)
- Fear in the Night (1947) as Rental Home Owner (uncredited)
- Blaze of Noon (1947) as Hatchet-Faced Wife (uncredited)
- Welcome Stranger (1947) as Townswoman (uncredited)
- The Perils of Pauline (1947) as Nurse (uncredited)
- Unconquered (1947) as Widow Swivens
- The Big Clock (1948) as Secretary (uncredited)
- Mr. Reckless (1948) as Wedding Guest (uncredited)
- Beyond Glory (1948) as Motherly Churchgoer (uncredited)
- Night Has a Thousand Eyes (1948) as Companion (uncredited)
- Joan of Arc (1948) as Townswoman (uncredited)
- Alias Nick Beal (1949) as Reformer (uncredited)
- A Connecticut Yankee in King Arthur's Court (1949) as Lady Penelope
- Red, Hot and Blue (1949) as Julia – Housekeeper
- Song of Surrender (1949) as Bidder (uncredited)
- Chicago Deadline (1949) as Nurse (uncredited)
- Samson and Delilah (1949) as Hisham
- The Lawless (1950) as Mrs. Jensen
- Where Danger Lives (1950) as Nurse Seymour (uncredited)
- Sunset Boulevard (1950) as Hisham (uncredited)
- Copper Canyon (1950) as Proprietor's Wife (uncredited)
- Here Comes the Groom (1951) as Passenger on Airplane (uncredited)
- The Greatest Show on Earth (1952) as Birdie
- The Ten Commandments (1956) as Elisheba
- The Buccaneer (1958) as Dowager at Sale

== Bibliography ==
- DeMille, Cecil B. (1959). The Autobiography of Cecil B. DeMille. Prentice Hall. LCCN 59-15367.
- Kobal, John (2019). The Lost World of DeMille. University Press of Mississippi. ISBN 9781496825223.
