= Cecil B. DeMille =

American filmmaker and actor (1881–1959)

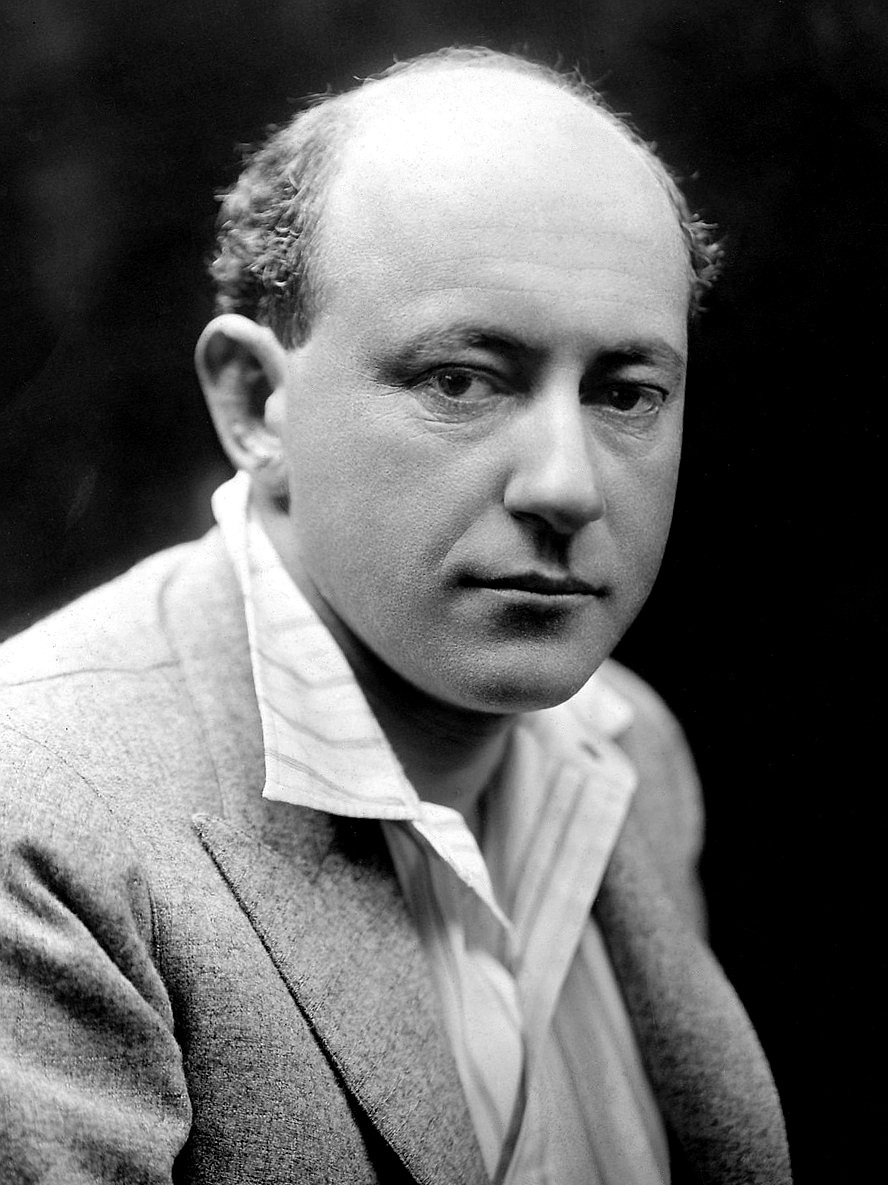
- Publicity portrait, c. 1920
- Born: Cecil Blount de Mille; August 12, 1881; Ashfield, Massachusetts, U.S.
- Died: January 21, 1959 (aged 77); Los Angeles, California, U.S.
- Resting place: Hollywood Forever Cemetery
- Education: Pennsylvania Military College; American Academy of Dramatic Arts
- Occupations: Film director; screenwriter; producer; editor; actor
- Years active: 1899–1958
- Political party: Republican
- Spouse: Constance Adams DeMille (m. 1902)
- Children: 4, including Katherine DeMille (adopted) and Richard de Mille (adopted)
- Parent(s): Henry Churchill de Mille; Matilda Beatrice deMille
- Relatives: William C. deMille (brother); Agnes de Mille (niece); Peggy George (niece); Richard Wyckoff (cousin); Anthony Quinn (son-in-law)
- Website: Official website

Cecil Blount DeMille (/ˈsɛsəl dəˈmɪl/; August 12, 1881 – January 21, 1959) was an American movie producer, director and actor. Between 1914 and 1958, he created 70 features including silent and sound films. He is acknowledged as a founding father of American cinema and the most commercially successful producer-director in film history, with many films dominating the box office three or four at a time. His films were distinguished by their epic scale and by his cinematic showmanship. His silent films included social dramas, comedies, Westerns, farces, morality plays, and historical pageants.

Born in Ashfield, Massachusetts, and raised in New York City, DeMille began his career as a stage actor in 1900. He later began to write and direct stage plays, a few with his older brother William de Mille, and some with Jesse L. Lasky, who was then a vaudeville producer. DeMille's first film, The Squaw Man (1914), was the first full-length feature film shot in Hollywood. Its interracial love story was commercially successful, and the film marked Hollywood as the new home of the U.S. film industry. Based on continued film successes, DeMille founded Famous Players-Lasky, which was later reverse merged into Paramount Pictures with Lasky and Adolph Zukor. His first biblical epic, The Ten Commandments (1923), was both a critical and commercial success; it held the Paramount revenue record for 25 years.

DeMille directed The King of Kings (1927), a biography of Jesus, which gained approval for its sensitivity and reached more than 800 million viewers. The Sign of the Cross (1932) is said to be the first sound film to integrate all aspects of cinematic technique. Cleopatra (1934) was his first film to be nominated for the Academy Award for Best Picture. After more than 30 years in film production, DeMille reached a pinnacle in his career with Samson and Delilah (1949), a biblical epic that became the highest-grossing film of 1950. Along with biblical and historical narratives, he also directed films oriented toward "neo-naturalism", which focused on portraying the laws of man fighting the forces of nature.

DeMille received his first nomination for the Academy Award for Best Director for his circus drama The Greatest Show on Earth (1952), which won both the Academy Award for Best Picture and the Golden Globe Award for Best Motion Picture — Drama. His 1956 remake of The Ten Commandments became his final and best-known film; also, a Best Picture Academy Award nominee, it is the eighth highest-grossing film of all time, adjusted for inflation. In addition to his Best Picture Awards, DeMille received an Academy Honorary Award for his film contributions, the Palme d'Or (posthumously) for Union Pacific (1939), a DGA Award for Lifetime Achievement, and the Irving G. Thalberg Memorial Award. He was the first recipient of the Golden Globe Cecil B. DeMille Award, which was named in his honor. DeMille's reputation had a renaissance in the 2010s, and his work has influenced numerous other films and directors.

== Biography ==
=== 1881–1899: early years ===
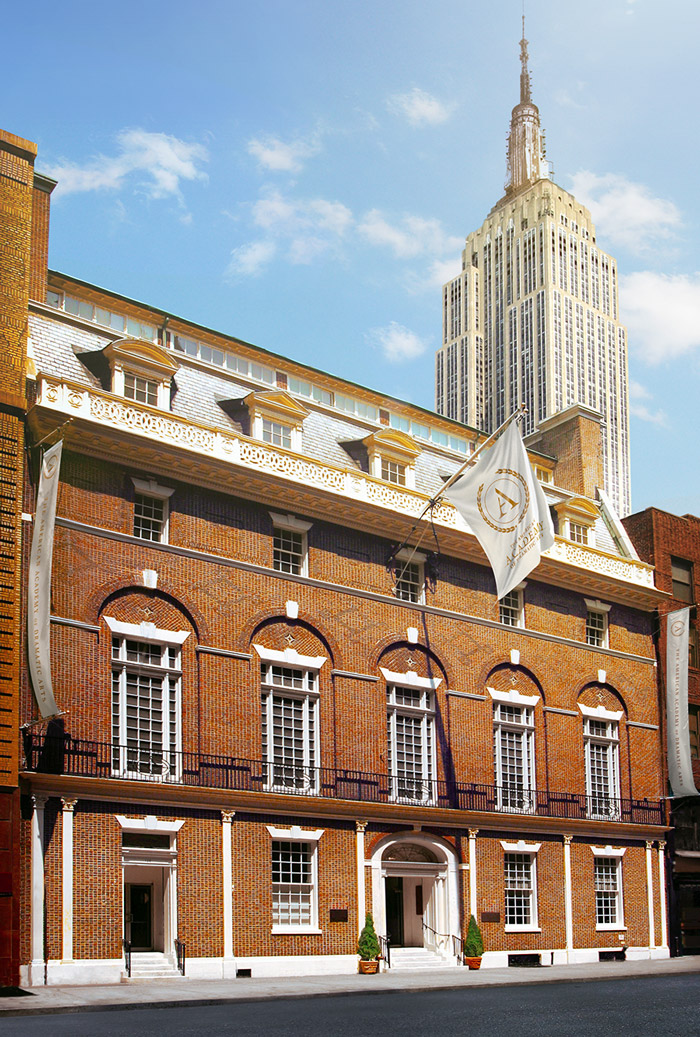
The American Academy of Dramatic Arts in New York

Cecil Blount DeMille was of paternal Dutch ancestry. His surname was spelled de Mil before his grandfather William added an "le" for "visual symmetry".

As an adult, Cecil De Mille adopted the spelling DeMille because he believed it would look better on a marquee, but continued to use de Mille in private life. The family name de Mille was used by his children, Cecilia, John, Richard, and Katherine. Cecil's brother, William, and his daughters, Margaret and Agnes, as well as DeMille's granddaughter, Cecilia de Mille Presley, also used the de Mille spelling.

DeMille was born on August 12, 1881, in a boarding house on Main Street in Ashfield, Massachusetts, where his parents had been vacationing for the summer. On September 1, 1881, the family returned with the newborn DeMille to their flat in New York. DeMille was named after his grandmothers, Cecilia Wolff and Margarete Blount. He was the second of three children of Henry Churchill de Mille (September 4, 1853 – February 10, 1893) and his wife, Matilda Beatrice DeMille (née Samuel; January 30, 1853 – October 8, 1923), known as Beatrice. His older brother, William C. DeMille, was born on July 25, 1878.

Henry de Mille, whose ancestors were of English and Dutch Belgian descent, was a North Carolina-born dramatist, actor, and lay reader in the Episcopal Church. In New York, Henry also taught English at Columbia College (now Columbia University). He worked as a playwright, administrator, and faculty member during the early years of the American Academy of Dramatic Arts, established in New York City in 1884. Henry de Mille frequently collaborated with David Belasco in playwriting; their best-known collaborations included "The Wife", "Lord Chumley", "The Charity Ball", and "Men and Women".

Cecil B. DeMille's mother, Beatrice, a literary agent and scriptwriter, was the daughter of German Jews. She had emigrated from England with her parents in 1871 when she was 18; the newly arrived family settled in Brooklyn, New York, where they maintained a middle-class, English-speaking household.

DeMille's parents met as members of a music and literary society in New York. Henry was a tall, red-headed student. Beatrice was intelligent, educated, forthright, and strong-willed. They married on July 1, 1876, despite Beatrice's parents' objections due to the young couple's differing religions; Beatrice converted to Episcopalianism.

DeMille watched his father and Belasco rehearse plays. He attended a lunch with his father and actor Edwin Booth. As a child, DeMille created a character named Champion Driver based on Robin Hood.

His father and his family had lived in Washington, North Carolina, until Henry built a three-story Victorian-style house for his family in Pompton Lakes, New Jersey; named this estate "Pamlico". John Philip Sousa was a friend of the family, and DeMille recalled throwing mud balls in the air so neighbor Annie Oakley could practice her shooting. DeMille's sister, Agnes, was born on April 23, 1891; his mother nearly did not survive the birth. Agnes died on February 11, 1894, from spinal meningitis. (Note: DeMille's niece and William deMille's daughter Agnes de Mille was a famed dancer-choreographer.)

DeMille's parents operated a private school in Pompton Lakes and attended Christ Episcopal Church. DeMille recalled that this church was the place where he visualized the story of his 1923 version of The Ten Commandments.

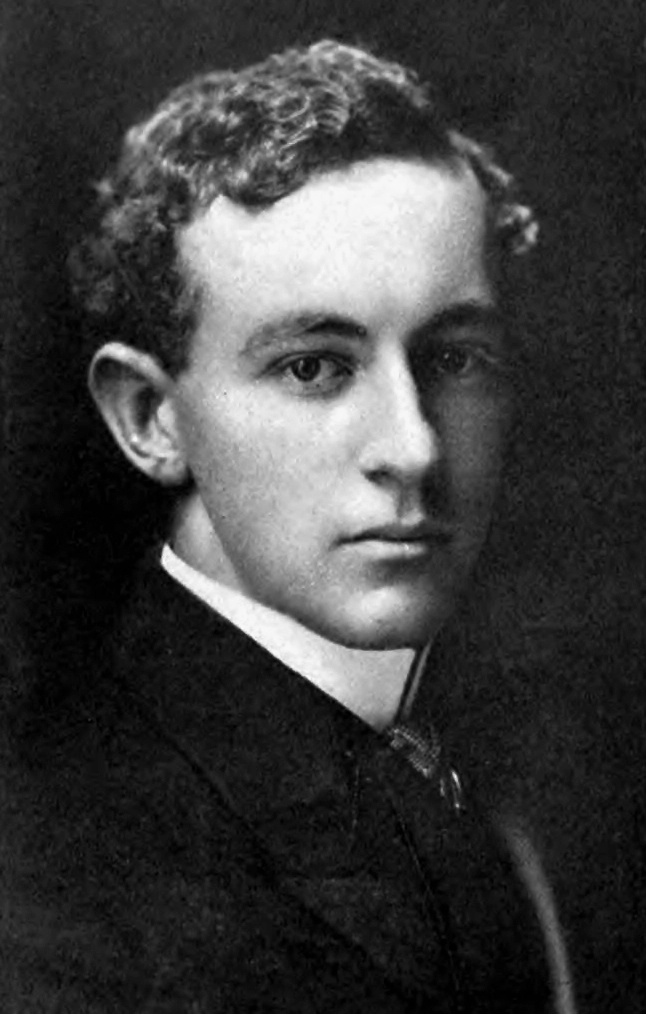
DeMille as a young man, c. 1904

On January 8, 1893, at age 40, Henry de Mille died suddenly from typhoid fever, leaving Beatrice with three children. To provide for her family, she opened the Henry C. de Mille School for Girls in her home in February 1893. The school aimed to teach young women to properly understand and fulfill their duties to themselves, their home, and their country. Beatrice had "enthusiastically supported" Henry's theatrical aspirations. She later became the second female play broker on Broadway. On Henry's deathbed, he told his wife that he did not want his sons to become playwrights. DeMille's mother sent him to Pennsylvania Military College (now Widener University) in Chester, Pennsylvania, at the age of 15. He fled the school to join the Spanish–American War, but failed to meet the age requirement. At the military college, even though his grades were average, he reportedly excelled in personal conduct.

DeMille attended the American Academy of Dramatic Arts (tuition-free due to his father's service to the academy). He graduated in 1900, and for graduation, his performance was in the play The Arcady Trail. In the audience was Charles Frohman, who cast DeMille in his play Hearts Are Trumps, DeMille's Broadway debut.

DeMille was an active Freemason and member of Prince of Orange Lodge #16 in New York City.

=== 1900–1912: theater ===
==== Charles Frohman, Constance Adams, and David Belasco ====
Cecil B. DeMille began his career as an actor on stage in 1900 with the theatrical company of Charles Frohman. He debuted on February 21, 1900, in the play Hearts Are Trumps at New York's Garden Theater. In 1901, DeMille starred in productions of A Repentance, To Have and to Hold, and Are You a Mason? At age 21, he married Constance Adams on August 16, 1902, at Adams's father's home in East Orange, New Jersey. The wedding party was small. Beatrice DeMille's family did not attend. Simon Louvish suggests that this was to conceal DeMille's partial Jewish heritage. Adams was 29 years old at the time of the marriage. They had met in a theater in Washington, D.C. while they were both acting in Hearts Are Trumps.

They were sexually incompatible; according to DeMille, Adams was too "pure" to "feel such violent and evil passions" as he. DeMille had more violent sexual preferences and fetishes than his wife. Adams allowed DeMille to have several long-term mistresses during their marriage as an outlet while maintaining an appearance of a faithful marriage. One of DeMille's affairs was with his screenwriter Jeanie MacPherson. Despite his reputation for extramarital affairs, DeMille did not like to have affairs with his stars, as he believed it would cause him to lose control as a director. He once said he maintained his self-control when Gloria Swanson sat on his lap and refused to touch her.

In 1902, he played a minor role in Hamlet. Publicists wrote that he became an actor to learn how to direct and produce, but DeMille admitted that he became an actor to pay the bills. From 1904 to 1905, he attempted to make a living as a stock theater actor with his wife, Constance. DeMille made a 1905 reprise in Hamlet as Osric. In the summer of 1905, DeMille joined the stock cast at the Elitch Theatre in Denver, Colorado. He appeared in 11 of the 15 plays presented that season, all in minor roles. Maude Fealy was the featured actress in several productions that summer and developed a lasting friendship with DeMille. (He later cast her in The Ten Commandments.)

His brother, William, was establishing himself as a playwright and sometimes invited DeMille to collaborate. DeMille and William collaborated on The Genius, The Royal Mounted, and After Five. None of these was very successful. William DeMille was most successful when he worked alone.

DeMille and his brother at times worked with the legendary impresario David Belasco, who had been a friend and collaborator of their father. DeMille later adapted Belasco's The Girl of the Golden West, Rose of the Rancho, and The Warrens of Virginia into films. He was credited with the conception of Belasco's The Return of Peter Grimm. The Return of Peter Grimm sparked controversy because Belasco had taken DeMille's unnamed screenplay, changed the characters, and named it The Return of Peter Grimm, producing and presenting it as his own work. DeMille was credited in small print as "based on an idea by Cecil DeMille". The play was successful, and DeMille was distraught that his childhood idol had plagiarized his work.

==== Losing interest in theater ====
DeMille performed on stage with actors he later directed in films: Charlotte Walker, Mary Pickford, and Pedro de Cordoba. He also produced and directed plays. His 1905 performance in The Prince Chap as the Earl of Huntington was well received by the audience.

DeMille wrote a few of his own plays in between stage performances, but his playwriting was less successful. His first play was The Pretender-A Play in a Prologue and 4 Acts set in 17th-century Russia. Another unperformed play he wrote was Son of the Winds, a mythological Native American story. Life was difficult for DeMille and his wife as traveling actors, but travel allowed him to experience parts of the United States he had not yet seen. DeMille sometimes worked with the director E. H. Sothern, who influenced DeMille's later perfectionism. In 1907, due to a scandal including one of Beatrice's students, Evelyn Nesbit, the Henry de Mille School lost students. The school closed, and Beatrice filed for bankruptcy. DeMille wrote another play, originally called Sergeant Devil May Care and renamed The Royal Mounted. He also toured with the Standard Opera Company, but there are few records of his singing ability.

On November 5, 1908, Constance and DeMille had a daughter, Cecilia, their only biological child. In the 1910s, DeMille began directing and producing other writers' plays.

DeMille was poor and struggled to find work. Consequently, his mother hired him for her agency, The DeMille Play Company, and taught him how to be an agent and a playwright. He became the agency's manager and later a junior partner with his mother. In 1911, DeMille became acquainted with vaudeville producer Jesse Lasky when Lasky was searching for a writer for his new musical. He initially sought out William DeMille. William had been a successful playwright, but DeMille was suffering from the failure of his plays The Royal Mounted and The Genius.

Beatrice introduced Lasky to Cecil DeMille instead. The collaboration of DeMille and Lasky produced two successful musicals, California and The Antique Girl, both opened in New York in January 1912. In the spring of 1913, DeMille found success producing Reckless Age by Lee Wilson, a play about a high-society girl wrongly accused of manslaughter, starring Frederick Burton and Sydney Shields. But changes in the theater rendered DeMille's melodramas obsolete before they were produced, and true theatrical success eluded him. He produced many flops. Having become uninterested in working in theater, DeMille became ignited by a passion for film when he watched the 1912 French film Les Amours de la reine Élisabeth.

=== 1913–1914: entering films ===
The Squaw Man (1914) full film

Desiring a change of scene, DeMille, Lasky, Sam Goldfish (later Samuel Goldwyn), and a group of East Coast businessmen created the Jesse L. Lasky Feature Play Company in 1913, of which DeMille became director-general. Lasky and DeMille were said to have sketched out the organization of the company on the back of a restaurant menu. As director-general, DeMille's job was to make the films. In addition to directing, he was the supervisor and consultant for the first year of films the company made. Sometimes, he directed scenes for other directors at the company in order to release films on time. Moreover, he co-authored other Lasky Company scripts and created screen adaptations that others directed.

The Lasky Play Company tried to recruit William de Mille, but he rejected the offer because he did not believe there was any promise in a film career. When William found out that DeMille had begun working in the motion picture industry, he wrote his brother a letter, saying that he was disappointed that Cecil was willing "to throw away [his] future" when he was "born and raised in the finest traditions of the theater".

The Lasky Company wanted to attract high-class audiences to their films, so it began producing films from literary works. The company bought the rights to Edwin Milton Royle's play The Squaw Man and cast Dustin Farnum in the lead role. It offered Farnum a choice between a quarter's stock in the company or $250 in weekly salary. Farnum chose the salary. Already $15,000 in debt to Royle for the screenplay of The Squaw Man, Lasky's relatives bought the $5,000 stock to save the Lasky Company from bankruptcy. With no knowledge of filmmaking, DeMille was introduced to observe the process at film studios. He was eventually introduced to Oscar Apfel, a stage director who had been a director with the Edison Company.

On December 12, 1913, DeMille, his cast, and crew boarded a Southern Pacific train bound for Flagstaff via New Orleans. His tentative plan was to shoot a film in Arizona, but he felt that Arizona lacked the Western look they were searching for. They also learned that other filmmakers were successfully shooting in Los Angeles, even in winter. He continued to Los Angeles. Once there, he chose not to shoot in Edendale, where many studios were, but in Hollywood. DeMille rented a barn to function as their film studio. Filming began on December 29, 1913, and lasted three weeks. Apfel filmed most of The Squaw Man due to DeMille's inexperience, but DeMille learned quickly and was particularly adept at impromptu screenwriting as necessary. He made his first film run 60 minutes, as long as a short play. The Squaw Man (1914), co-directed by Apfel, was a sensation, and it established the Lasky Company. It was the first feature-length film made in Hollywood. There were problems with the perforation of the film stock, and it was discovered that DeMille had brought a cheap British film perforator that had punched in 65 holes per foot instead of the industry standard of 64. Lasky and DeMille convinced film pioneer Siegmund Lubin of the Lubin Manufacturing Company to have his experienced technicians reperforate the film.

This was the first American feature film, according to its release date. D. W. Griffith's Judith of Bethulia was filmed earlier than The Squaw Man, but released later. This as the only film in which DeMille shared director's credit with Apfel.

The Squaw Man was a success, which led to the eventual founding of Paramount Pictures and Hollywood becoming the "film capital of the world". The film grossed more than ten times its budget after its premiere in New York in February 1914. DeMille's next project was to aid Apfel in directing Brewster's Millions, which was wildly successful. In December 1914, Constance Adams brought home John DeMille, a 15-month-old boy, whom the couple legally adopted three years later. Biographer Scott Eyman suggested that she may have decided to adopt after recently having had a miscarriage. (Note: Unlike the other children that the DeMilles adopted, they never told John about his birth parents.)

=== 1915–1928: silent era ===
==== Era Westerns, Paradise, and World War I ====
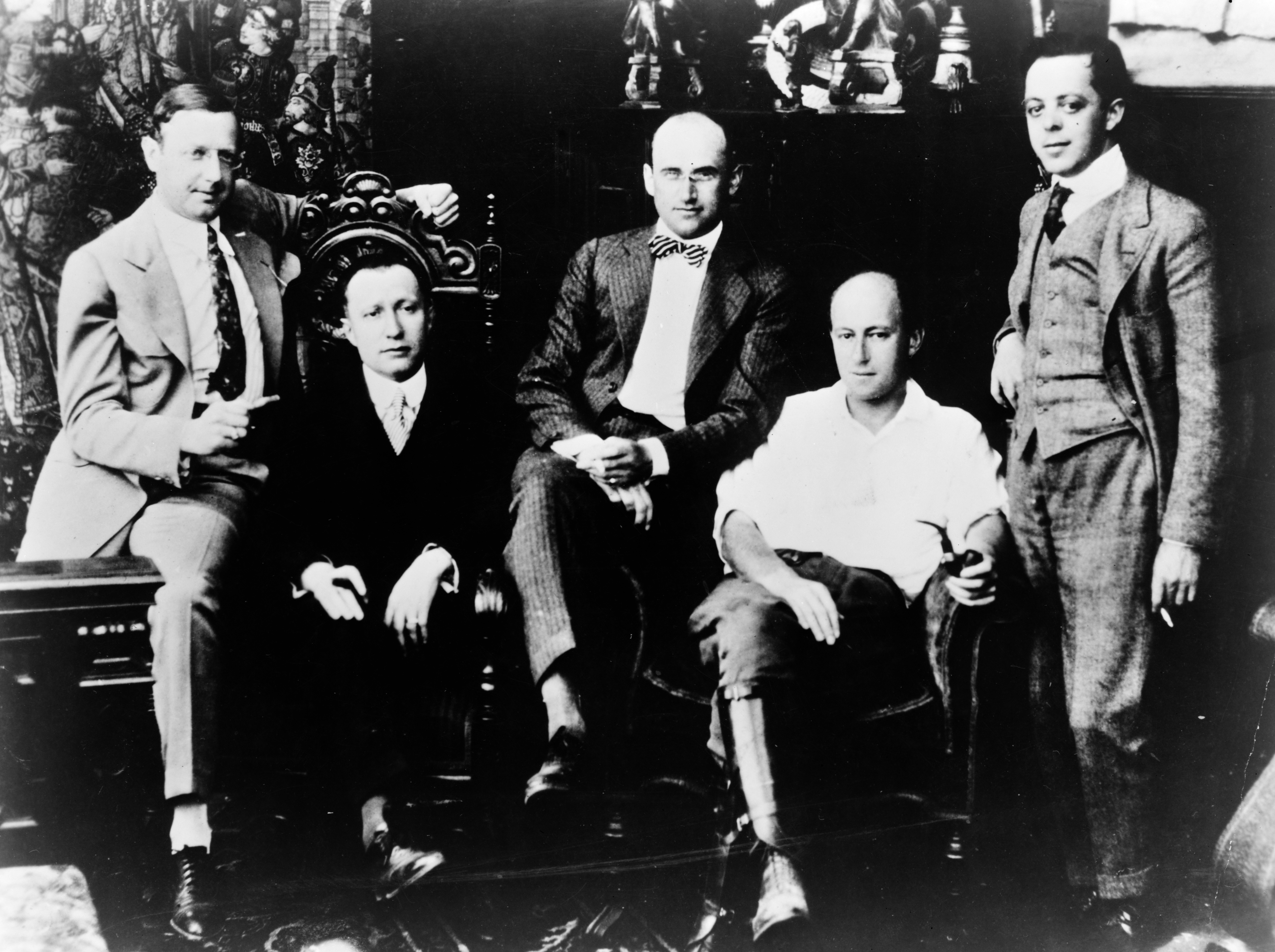
Famous Players–Lasky Corporation – DeMille is seated, second from the right.

Cecil B. DeMille's second film, credited exclusively to him, was The Virginian. It is the earliest of DeMille's films available in a quality, color-tinted video format, but that version is actually a 1918 rerelease. The Lasky Company's first few years were spent making films nonstop. DeMille directed 20 films by 1915. The most successful films during this period were Brewster's Millions, Rose of the Rancho, and The Ghost Breaker. DeMille adapted Belasco's dramatic lighting techniques to film technology, mimicking moonlight with U.S. cinema's first attempts at "motivated lighting" in The Warrens of Virginia. This was the first of a few film collaborations with his brother William. They struggled to adapt the play from the stage to the set. After the film was shown, viewers complained that the shadows and lighting prevented the audience from seeing the actors' full faces and said they would pay only half price. Sam Goldwyn suggested that if they called it "Rembrandt" lighting, the audience would pay double the price. Additionally, because of DeMille's cordiality after the Peter Grimm incident, DeMille was able to rekindle his partnership with Belasco. He adapted several of Belasco's screenplays into film.

DeMille's most successful film was The Cheat; his direction in the film was critically acclaimed. In 1916, exhausted from three years of nonstop filmmaking, DeMille purchased land in the Angeles National Forest for a ranch that would become his getaway. He called this place "Paradise", declaring it a wildlife sanctuary; no shooting of animals besides snakes was allowed. His wife did not like Paradise, so DeMille often brought his mistresses there with him, including actress Julia Faye. In 1921, DeMille purchased a yacht he called The Seaward. (Note: DeMille liked to sail and dive; he had several boats throughout his lifetime. He donated The Seaward, his most cherished boat, to the merchant marine for service during World War II. The boat was returned to him destroyed. DeMille gave up the boat and never bought another one.)

While filming The Captive in 1915, an extra, Charles Chandler, died on set when another extra failed to heed DeMille's orders to unload all guns for rehearsal. DeMille instructed the guilty man to leave town and never reveal his name. Lasky and DeMille maintained Chandler's widow on the payroll and, according to leading actor House Peters Sr., DeMille refused to stop production for Chandler's funeral. Peters said that he encouraged the cast to attend the funeral with him anyway, since DeMille would not be able to shoot the film without him. On July 19, 1916, the Jesse Lasky Feature Play Company merged with Adolph Zukor's Famous Players Film Company, becoming Famous Players–Lasky. Zukor became president, Lasky vice president, DeMille director-general, and Goldwyn chairman of the board. Famous Players–Lasky later fired Goldwyn for frequent clashes with Lasky, DeMille, and Zukor. While on a European vacation in 1921, DeMille contracted rheumatic fever in Paris. He was confined to bed and unable to eat. His poor physical condition upon returning home affected the production of his 1922 film Manslaughter. According to Richard Birchard, DeMille's weakened state during production may have led to the film being received as uncharacteristically substandard.

During World War I, Famous Players–Lasky organized a military company under the National Guard, the Home Guard, made up of film studio employees, with DeMille as captain. Eventually, the Guard was enlarged to a battalion and recruited soldiers from other film studios. They took time off weekly to practice military drills. Additionally, during the war, DeMille volunteered for the Justice Department's Intelligence Office, investigating friends, neighbors, and others he came in contact with in connection with the Famous Players–Lasky. He also volunteered for the Intelligence Office during World War II. DeMille considered enlisting in World War I, but stayed in the U.S. and made films. He did take a few months to set up a movie theater for the French front. Famous Players–Lasky donated the films. DeMille and Adams adopted Katherine Lester in 1920, whom Adams had found in the orphanage she directed. (Note: Katherine's father had been killed in World War I and her mother had died of tuberculosis. To DeMille's dismay, Katherine became an actress; however, she ultimately gained his approval. In 1936 she married actor Anthony Quinn.) In 1922, the couple adopted Richard DeMille. (Note: After the death of William deMille, DeMille revealed to Richard DeMille that William was his father and he had been born to William and a mistress. DeMille had adopted him to avoid revealing the affairs to William's wife. The mistress could not keep the boy due to her tuberculosis. DeMille became a notable psychiatrist, filmmaker and writer.)

==== Scandalous dramas, Biblical epics, and departure from Paramount ====
Films became more sophisticated, and the Lasky company's subsequent films were criticized for their primitive and unrealistic set design. Consequently, Beatrice DeMille introduced the Famous Players–Lasky to Wilfred Buckland, whom DeMille knew from his time at the American Academy of Dramatic Arts, and he became DeMille's art director. William DeMille reluctantly became a story editor. William later converted from theater to Hollywood and spent the rest of his career as a film director. DeMille frequently remade his own films. In 1917, he remade The Squaw Man (1918), only four years after the original. Despite its quick turnaround, the film was fairly successful. DeMille's second remake at MGM in 1931 was a failure.

After five years and 30 hit films, DeMille became the most successful director in the American film industry. In the silent era, he was renowned for Male and Female, Manslaughter, The Volga Boatman, and The Godless Girl. His trademark scenes included bathtubs, lion attacks, and Roman orgies. Many of his films featured scenes in two-color Technicolor. In 1923, DeMille released the modern melodrama The Ten Commandments, a significant change from his previous irreligious films. The film was produced on a budget of $600,000, and it was Paramount's most expensive production to date. This concerned Paramount executives, but the film was the studio's highest-grossing film. It held the Paramount record for 25 years until DeMille broke the record again.

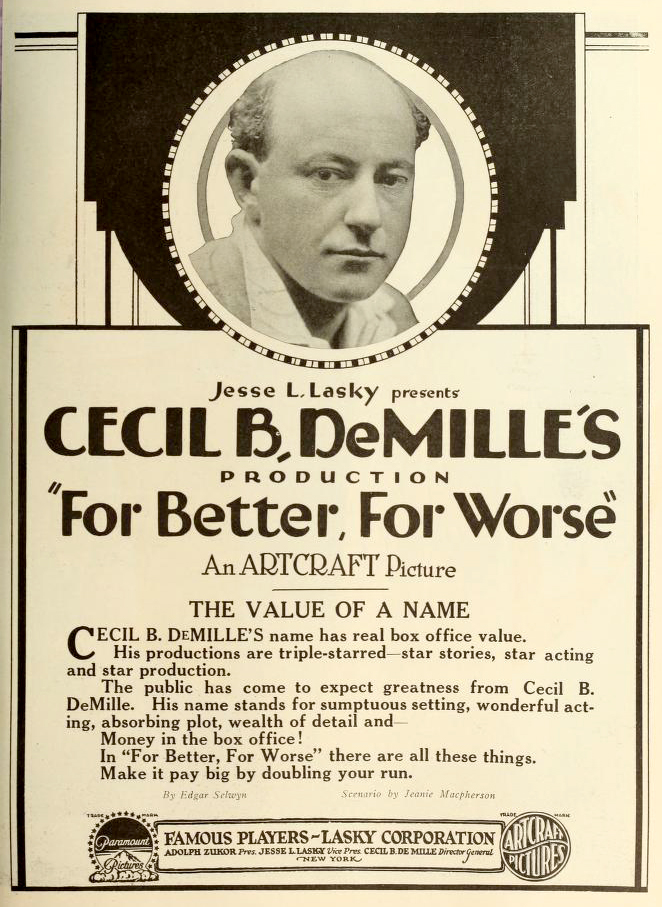
Advertisement (1919)

In the early 1920s, scandal surrounded Paramount; religious groups and the media opposed portrayals of immorality in films. A censorship board called the Hays Code was established. DeMille's film The Affairs of Anatol came under fire. Furthermore, DeMille argued with Zukor over his extravagant and over-budget production costs. Consequently, DeMille left Paramount in 1924 despite having helped establish it. He joined the Producers Distributing Corporation. His first film in the new production company, DeMille Pictures Corporation, was The Road to Yesterday in 1925. He directed and produced four films on his own, working with Producers Distributing Corporation because he found front office supervision too restricting. Aside from The King of Kings, none of DeMille's films away from Paramount were successful. The King of Kings established DeMille as "master of the grandiose and of biblical sagas". Considered at the time the most successful Christian film of the silent era, DeMille calculated that it had been viewed over 800 million times around the world. After the release of DeMille's The Godless Girl, silent films in America became obsolete, and DeMille was forced to shoot a shoddy final reel with the new sound production technique. Although this final reel looked so different from the first 11 reels that it appeared to be from another movie, according to Simon Louvish, the film is one of DeMille's strangest and most "DeMillean" film.

The immense popularity of DeMille's silent films enabled him to branch out into other areas. The Roaring Twenties were the boom years and DeMille took full advantage, opening the Mercury Aviation Company, one of America's first commercial airlines. He was also a real estate speculator, an underwriter of political campaigns, vice president of Bank of America, and vice president of the Commercial National Trust and Savings Bank in Los Angeles, where he approved loans for other filmmakers. In 1916, DeMille purchased a mansion in Hollywood. Charlie Chaplin lived next door for a time, and after he moved, DeMille purchased the other house and combined the estates.

=== 1929–1956: sound era ===
==== MGM and return to Paramount ====
When "talking pictures" were invented in 1928, DeMille made a successful transition, offering his own innovations to the painful process; he devised a microphone boom and a soundproof camera blimp. He also popularized the camera crane. His first three sound films, Dynamite, Madame Satan, and his 1931 remake of The Squaw Man, were produced at Metro-Goldwyn-Mayer. These films were critically and financially unsuccessful. He had completely adapted to the production of sound film despite the film's poor dialogue. After his contract ended at MGM, he left, but no production studios would hire him. He attempted to create a guild of six directors with the same creative desires called the Director's Guild, but the idea failed due to a lack of funding and commitment. Moreover, the Internal Revenue Service audited DeMille due to issues with his production company. This was, according to DeMille, the lowest point of his career. He traveled abroad to find employment until he was offered a deal at Paramount.

In 1932, DeMille returned to Paramount at Lasky's request, bringing with him his own production unit. His first film back at Paramount, The Sign of the Cross, was also his first success since leaving Paramount besides The King of Kings. Zukor approved DeMille's return on the condition that DeMille not exceed his production budget of $650,000 for The Sign of the Cross. Produced in eight weeks without exceeding budget, the film was financially successful. The Sign of the Cross was the first film to integrate all cinematic techniques. The film was considered a "masterpiece" and surpassed the quality of other sound films of the time. DeMille followed this epic with two dramas released in 1933 and 1934, This Day and Age and Four Frightened People. These were box-office disappointments, though Four Frightened People received good reviews. DeMille stuck to large-budget spectaculars for the rest of his career.

==== Politics and Lux Radio Theatre ====
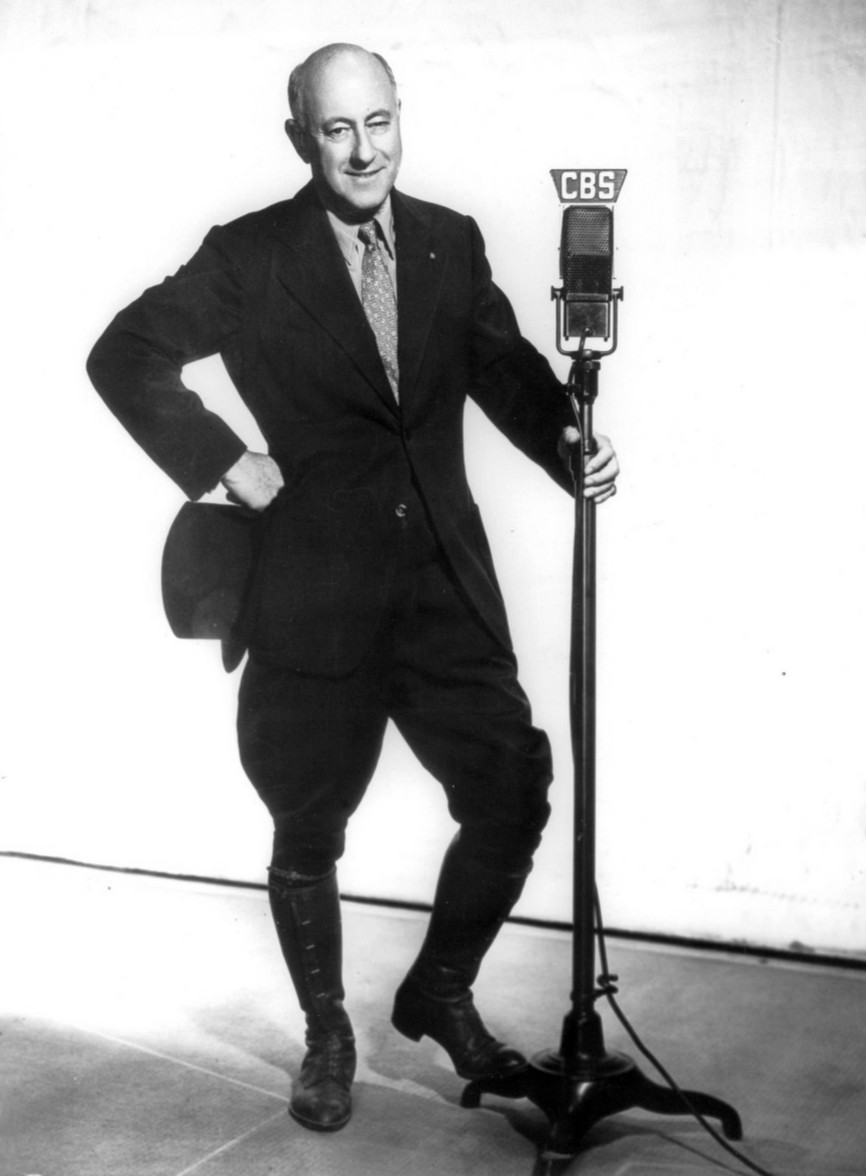
DeMille as producer of the Lux Radio Theatre, broadcast on CBS, 1937

DeMille was outspoken about his Episcopalian integrity, but his private life included mistresses and adultery. He was a conservative Republican activist, becoming more conservative as he aged. He was known as anti-union and worked to prevent the unionization of film production studios. But according to DeMille himself, he was not anti-union and belonged to a few unions. He said he was rather against union leaders such as Walter Reuther and Harry Bridges, whom he compared to dictators. He supported Herbert Hoover and, in 1928, made his largest campaign donation to Hoover. But DeMille also liked Franklin D. Roosevelt, finding him charismatic, tenacious, and intelligent, and agreeing with Roosevelt's abhorrence of Prohibition. DeMille lent Roosevelt a car for his 1932 United States presidential election campaign and voted for him. He never again voted for a Democratic candidate in a presidential election.

From June 1, 1936, until January 22, 1945, DeMille hosted and directed Lux Radio Theatre, a weekly digest of current feature films. Broadcast on the Columbia Broadcasting System (CBS) from 1935 to 1954, Lux Radio was one of the most popular weekly shows in radio history. While DeMille was host, the show had 40 million weekly listeners, and DeMille had an annual salary of $100,000. From 1936 to 1945, he produced, hosted, and directed every show, with the occasional exception of a guest director. He resigned from Lux Radio because he refused to pay a dollar to the American Federation of Radio Artists (AFRA), on the principle that no organization had the right to "levy a compulsory assessment upon any member".

DeMille sued the union for reinstatement but lost. He appealed to the California Supreme Court and lost again. When the AFRA expanded to television, DeMille was banned from television appearances. Consequently, he formed the DeMille Foundation for Political Freedom to campaign for the right to work. He gave speeches across the nation for the next few years. DeMille's primary criticism was of closed shops, but later included criticism of communism and unions in general. The U.S. Supreme Court declined to review his case, but DeMille lobbied for the Taft–Hartley Act, which passed. It prohibited denying anyone the right to work if they refused to pay a political assessment. But the law did not apply retroactively, so DeMille's television and radio appearance ban lasted the rest of his life, though he was permitted to appear on radio or television to publicize a movie. William Keighley replaced him. DeMille never worked in radio again. (Note: Frequent actors and actresses on the show included Barbara Stanwyck, Claudette Colbert, Loretta Young, Don Ameche, and Fred MacMurray.)

==== Adventure films and dramatic spectacles ====
In 1939, DeMille's Union Pacific was successful through DeMille's collaboration with the Union Pacific Railroad. The Union Pacific gave DeMille access to historical data, early period trains, and expert crews, adding to the film's authenticity. During pre-production, DeMille was dealing with his first serious health issue. In March 1938, he underwent a major emergency prostatectomy. He had a post-surgery infection from which he nearly did not recover, citing streptomycin as his saving grace. The surgery caused him to suffer from sexual dysfunction for the rest of his life, according to some family members. After his surgery and the success of Union Pacific, DeMille first used three-strip Technicolor in 1940, in North West Mounted Police. DeMille wanted to film in Canada, but due to budget constraints, the film was instead shot in Oregon and Hollywood. Critics were impressed with the visuals but found the scripts dull, calling it DeMille's "poorest Western". Despite the criticism, it was Paramount's highest-grossing film of the year. Audiences liked its highly saturated color, so DeMille made no further black-and-white features. DeMille was anti-communist and abandoned a project in 1940 to film Ernest Hemingway's For Whom the Bell Tolls due to its communist themes, even though he had already paid $100,000 for the rights to the novel. He was so eager to produce the film that he hadn't yet read it. He claimed he abandoned the project in order to complete a different project, but it was actually to preserve his reputation and avoid appearing reactionary. (Note: The project was later completed by DeMille's former assistant director Sam Wood who was notoriously anti-communist.) While concurrently filmmaking, he served during World War II at age 60 as his neighborhood air-raid warden.

In 1942, DeMille worked with Jeanie MacPherson and William DeMille to produce a film, Queen of Queens, that was intended to be about Mary, mother of Jesus. After reading the screenplay, Daniel A. Lord warned DeMille that Catholics would find the film too irreverent while non-Catholics would consider it Catholic propaganda. Consequently, the film was never made. MacPherson worked as a scriptwriter on many of DeMille's films. (Note: DeMille claimed that MacPherson was not a good writer, but she received credit in his films because she gave him many ideas for the screenplays.) In 1938, DeMille supervised the film compilation Land of Liberty as the American film industry's contribution to the 1939 New York World's Fair. He used clips from his own films in it. Land of Liberty was not a high-grossing film, but it was well-received, and DeMille was asked to shorten its running time to accommodate more showings per day. MGM distributed the film in 1941 and donated profits to World War II relief charities.

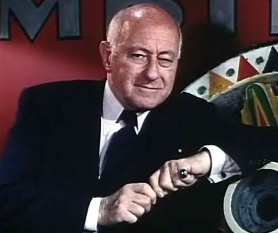
DeMille in the trailer for The Greatest Show on Earth (1952), the film for which he won the Academy Award for Best Picture

In 1942, DeMille released Paramount's most successful film, Reap the Wild Wind. It had a large budget and many special effects, including an electronically operated giant squid. After working on it, DeMille was the master of ceremonies at a rally organized by David O. Selznick in the Los Angeles Coliseum in support of the Dewey–Bricker presidential ticket as well as Governor Earl Warren of California. (Note: The gathering drew 93,000, with short speeches by Hedda Hopper and Walt Disney. Among those in attendance were Ann Sothern, Ginger Rogers, Randolph Scott, Adolphe Menjou, Gary Cooper, and Walter Pidgeon. Though the rally drew a good response, most Hollywood celebrities who took a public position sided with the Roosevelt-Truman ticket.) DeMille's 1947 film Unconquered had the longest running time (146 minutes), longest filming schedule (102 days), and largest budget ($5 million). Its sets and effects were so realistic that 30 extras needed to be hospitalized due to a scene with fireballs and flaming arrows. It was commercially very successful.

DeMille's next film, Samson and Delilah (1949), was Paramount's highest-grossing film up to that time. A Biblical epic with sex, it was a characteristically DeMille film. 1952's The Greatest Show on Earth became Paramount's highest-grossing film to that point and won the Academy Award for Best Picture and the Academy Award for Best Story. It began production in 1949. Ringling Brothers-Barnum and Bailey were paid $250,000 for use of the title and facilities. DeMille toured with the circus while helping write the script. Noisy and bright, the film was not well received by critics but was an audience favorite. In 1953, DeMille signed a contract with Prentice Hall to publish an autobiography. He reminisced into a voice recorder, the recording was transcribed, and the information was organized by topic. Art Arthur also interviewed people for the autobiography. DeMille did not like the biography's first draft, saying he thought the person portrayed in it was an egotistical "SOB". In the early 1950s, Allen Dulles and Frank Wisner recruited DeMille to serve on the board of the anti-communist National Committee for a Free Europe, the public face of the organization that oversaw Radio Free Europe. In 1954, Secretary of the Air Force Harold E. Talbott asked DeMille for help designing the cadet uniforms at the newly established United States Air Force Academy. DeMille's designs, most notably the cadet parade uniform, were praised by Air Force and Academy leadership, adopted, and still worn.

==== Final works and unrealized projects ====
We have just lived through a war where our people were systematically executed. Here we have a man who made a film praising the Jewish people, that tells of Samson, one of the legends of our Scripture. Now he wants to make the life of Moses. We should get down on our knees to Cecil and say "Thank you!"

— Alfred Zukor responding to DeMille's proposal of The Ten Commandments remake

In 1952, DeMille sought approval for a lavish remake of his 1923 silent film The Ten Commandments. He went before the Paramount board of directors, which was mostly Jewish-American. The board rejected his proposal, even though his last two films, Samson and Delilah and The Greatest Show on Earth, had been record-breaking hits. Adolph Zukor convinced the board to change its mind on the grounds of morality. DeMille did not have an exact budget proposal for the project, and it promised to be the most costly in U.S. film history. Still, the board unanimously approved it. The Ten Commandments, released in 1956, was DeMille's final film. It was the longest (3 hours, 39 minutes) and most expensive ($13 million) film in Paramount history. Production began in October 1954. The Exodus scene was filmed on-site in Egypt with four Technicolor-VistaVision cameras filming 12,000 people. Filming continued in 1955 in Paris and Hollywood on 30 different sound stages. They even expanded to RKO sound studios for filming. Post-production lasted a year, and the film premiered in Salt Lake City. Nominated for an Academy Award for Best Picture, it grossed over $80 million, which surpassed the gross of The Greatest Show on Earth and every other film in history except Gone with the Wind. DeMille offered ten percent of his profit to the crew, a unique practice at the time.

On November 7, 1954, while in Egypt filming the Exodus sequence for The Ten Commandments, DeMille (who was 73) climbed a 107-foot (33 m) ladder to the top of the set and had a serious heart attack. Despite the urging of his associate producer, DeMille wanted to return to the set right away. He developed a plan with his doctor to allow him to continue directing while reducing his physical stress. DeMille completed the film, but several more heart attacks diminished his health. His daughter Cecilia took over as director as DeMille sat behind the camera with Loyal Griggs as the cinematographer. This film was his last. (Note: While the film was a huge success, DeMille regretted that he could not share the success with his wife who had developed Alzheimer's disease.)

Due to his frequent heart attacks, DeMille asked his son-in-law, actor Anthony Quinn, to direct a remake of his 1938 film The Buccaneer. DeMille served as executive producer, overseeing producer Henry Wilcoxon. Despite a cast led by Charlton Heston and Yul Brynner, the 1958 film The Buccaneer was a disappointment. DeMille attended the Santa Barbara premiere in December 1958. He was unable to attend its Los Angeles premiere. In the months before his death, DeMille was researching a film biography of Robert Baden-Powell, the founder of the Scout Movement. DeMille asked David Niven to star in the film, but it was never made. DeMille was also planning a biblical epic film based on the Book of Revelation. His autobiography was mostly complete when he died and was published in November 1959.

==== Death ====
DeMille's tomb at Hollywood Forever Cemetery

DeMille suffered a series of heart attacks from June 1958 to January 1959, and died on January 21, 1959, following an attack. His funeral was held on January 23 at St. Stephen's Episcopal Church. He was entombed at the Hollywood Memorial Cemetery (now known as Hollywood Forever). After his death, news outlets such as The New York Times, the Los Angeles Times, and The Guardian called DeMille a "pioneer of movies", "the greatest creator and showman of our industry", and "the founder of Hollywood". DeMille left his multi-million dollar estate in Los Feliz, Los Angeles, in Laughlin Park to his daughter Cecilia because his wife had dementia and was unable to care for the estate. She died a year later. His personal will drew a line between Cecilia and his three adopted children, with Cecilia receiving a majority of DeMille's inheritance and estate. The other three children were surprised by this, as DeMille had not treated them differently in life. Cecilia lived in the house until she died in 1984. The house was auctioned by his granddaughter Cecilia DeMille Presley, who also lived there in the late 1980s. (Note: The estate cycled through several different homeowners for the next 30 years until it was bought by American actress Angelina Jolie in 2017 for nearly $25 million.)

== Filmmaking ==
=== Influences ===
DeMille believed his first influences to be his parents, Henry and Beatrice DeMille. His playwright father introduced him to the theater at a young age. Henry was heavily influenced by the work of Charles Kingsley, whose ideas trickled down to DeMille. DeMille noted that his mother had a "high sense of the dramatic" and was determined to continue the artistic legacy of her husband after he died. Beatrice became a play broker and author's agent, influencing DeMille's early life and career. DeMille's father worked with David Belasco, a theatrical producer, impresario, and playwright. Belasco was known for adding realistic elements in his plays, such as real flowers, food, and aromas that could transport his audiences into the scenes. While working in the theatre, DeMille used real fruit trees in his play California, as influenced by Belasco. Similar to Belasco, DeMille's theatre revolved around entertainment rather than artistry. Generally, Belasco's influence on DeMille's career can be seen in DeMille's showmanship and narration. E. H. Sothern's early influence on DeMille's work can be seen in DeMille's perfectionism. DeMille recalled that one of the most influential plays he saw was Hamlet, directed by Sothern.

=== Method ===
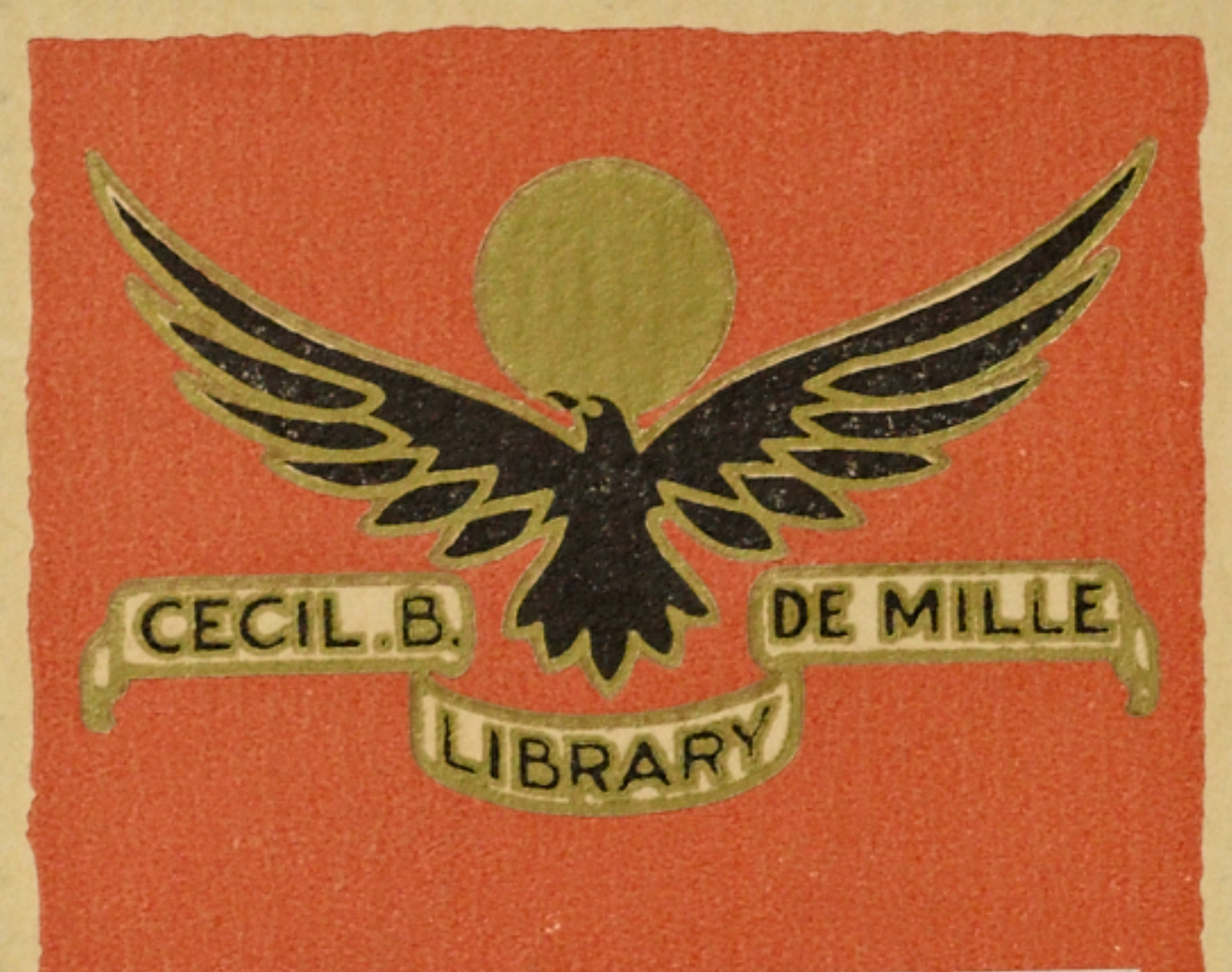
Cecil B. DeMille bookplate from his library

DeMille's filmmaking process always began with extensive research. Next, he would work with writers to develop the story that he was envisioning. Then, he would help writers construct a script. Finally, he would leave the script with artists and allow them to create artistic depictions and renderings of each scene. Plot and dialogue were not a strong point of DeMille's films. Consequently, he focused his efforts on his films' visuals. He worked with visual technicians, editors, art directors, costume designers, cinematographers, and set carpenters in order to perfect the visual aspects of his films. With his editor, Anne Bauchens, DeMille used editing techniques to allow the visual images to bring the plot to a climax rather than dialogue. DeMille had large and frequent office conferences to discuss and examine all aspects of the working film, including storyboards, props, and special effects.

DeMille rarely gave direction to actors; he preferred to "office-direct", where he would work with actors in his office, going over characters and reading through scripts. Any problems on the set were often fixed by writers in the office rather than on the set. DeMille did not believe a large movie set was the place to discuss minor character or line issues. DeMille was particularly adept at directing and managing large crowds in his films. Martin Scorsese recalled that DeMille had the skill to maintain control not only of the lead actors in a frame but also of the many extras in the frame. DeMille was adept at directing "thousands of extras", and many of his pictures include spectacular set pieces: the toppling of the pagan temple in Samson and Delilah; train wrecks in The Road to Yesterday, Union Pacific and The Greatest Show on Earth; the destruction of an airship in Madam Satan; and the parting of the Red Sea in both versions of The Ten Commandments.

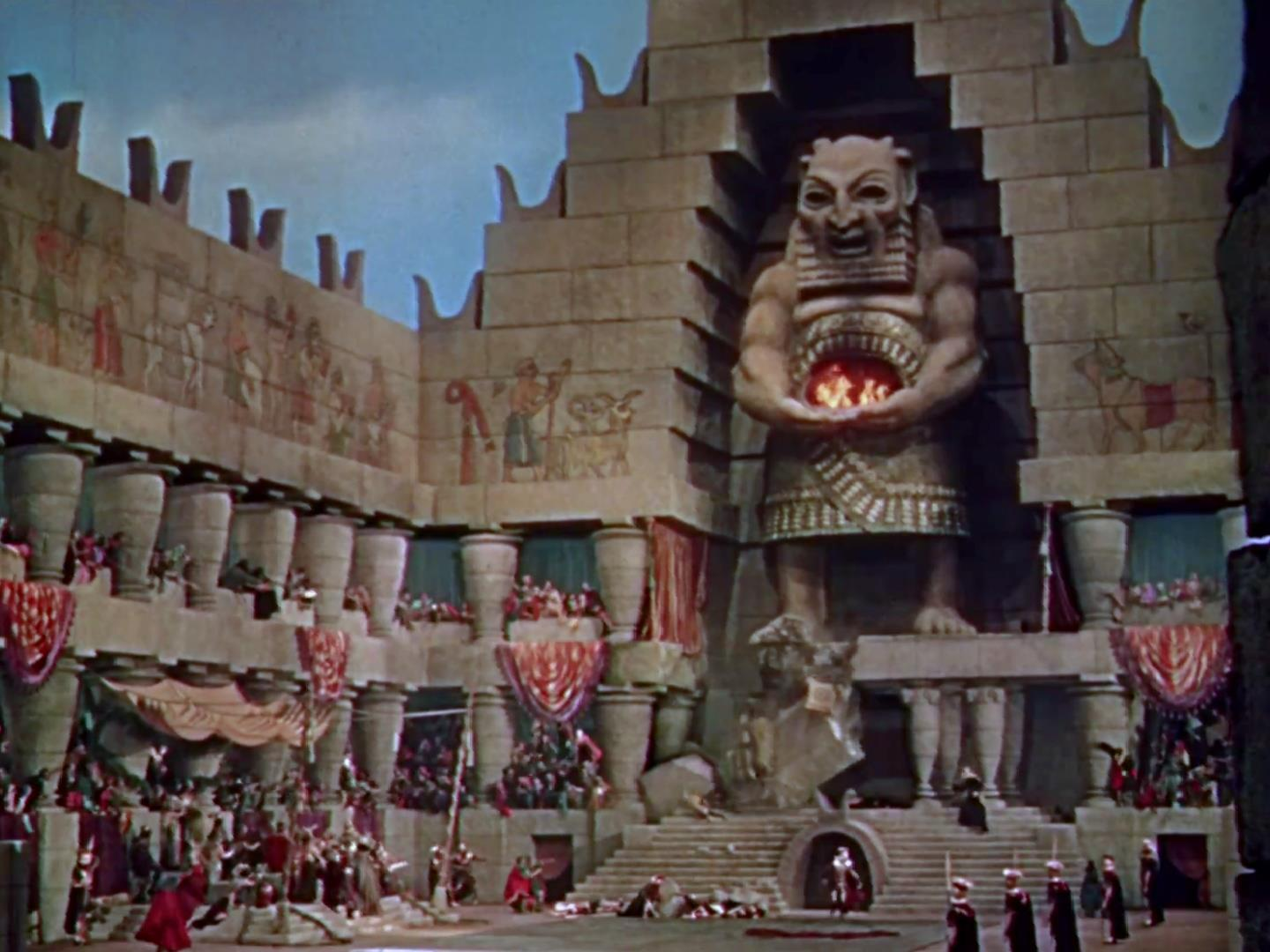
DeMille's set pieces include this pagan temple in Samson and Delilah (1949)

In his early films, DeMille experimented with photographic light and shade, which created dramatic shadows instead of glare. His specific use of lighting, influenced by his mentor David Belasco, was for the purpose of creating "striking images" and heightening "dramatic situations". DeMille was unique in using this technique. In addition to his use of volatile and abrupt film editing, his lighting and composition were innovative for the time period, as filmmakers were primarily concerned with a clear, realistic image. Another important aspect of DeMille's editing technique was to put the film away for a week or two after an initial edit to re-edit the picture with a fresh mind. This allowed for the rapid production of his films in the early years of the Lasky Company. The cuts were sometimes rough, but the movies were always interesting.

DeMille often edited in a manner that favored psychological space rather than physical space through his cuts. In this way, the characters' thoughts and desires are the visual focus rather than the circumstances regarding the physical scene. As DeMille's career progressed, he increasingly relied on artist Dan Sayre Groesbeck's concept, costume, and storyboard art. Groesbeck's art was circulated on set to give actors and crew members a better understanding of DeMille's vision. His art was even shown at Paramount meetings when pitching new films. DeMille adored the art of Groesbeck, even hanging it above his fireplace, but film staff found it difficult to convert his art into three-dimensional sets. As DeMille continued to rely on Groesbeck, the nervous energy of his early films transformed into more steady compositions of his later films. While visually appealing, this made the films appear more old-fashioned.

Composer Elmer Bernstein described DeMille as "sparing no effort" when filmmaking. Bernstein recalled that DeMille would scream, yell, or flatter—whatever it took to achieve the perfection he required in his films. DeMille was painstakingly attentive to details on set and was as critical of himself as he was of his crew. Costume designer Dorothy Jeakins, who worked with DeMille on The Ten Commandments (1956), said that he was skilled in humiliating people. Jeakins admitted that she received quality training from him, but that it was necessary to become a perfectionist on a DeMille set to avoid being fired. DeMille had an authoritarian persona on set; he required absolute attention from the cast and crew. He had a band of assistants who catered to his needs. He would speak to the entire set, sometimes enormous, with countless crew members and extras, via a microphone to maintain control of the set. He was disliked by many inside and outside the film industry for his cold and controlling reputation. (Note: Further illustrated by his home life, DeMille required formality and politeness at home. Sons-and daughters-in-law were required to call him "Mr. DeMille", and Richard deMille never recalled hugging his father, claiming he received handshakes instead.)

DeMille was known for autocratic behavior on the set, singling out and berating extras who were not paying attention. Many of these displays were thought to be staged, however, as an exercise in discipline. He despised actors who were unwilling to take physical risks, especially when he had first demonstrated that the required stunt would not harm them. This occurred with Victor Mature in Samson and Delilah. Mature refused to wrestle Jackie the Lion, even though DeMille had just tussled with the lion, proving that he was tame. DeMille told the actor that he was "one hundred percent yellow". Paulette Goddard's refusal to risk personal injury in a scene involving fire in Unconquered cost her DeMille's favor and a role in The Greatest Show on Earth. DeMille did receive help in his films, notably from Alvin Wyckoff, who shot forty-three of DeMille's films; brother William DeMille, who would occasionally serve as his screenwriter; Jeanie Macpherson, who served as DeMille's exclusive screenwriter for fifteen years; and Eddie Salven, DeMille's favorite assistant director.

DeMille made stars of unknown actors: Gloria Swanson, Bebe Daniels, Rod La Rocque, William Boyd, Claudette Colbert, and Charlton Heston. He also cast established stars such as Gary Cooper, Robert Preston, Paulette Goddard, and Fredric March in multiple pictures. DeMille cast some of his performers repeatedly, including Henry Wilcoxon, Julia Faye, Joseph Schildkraut, Ian Keith, Charles Bickford, Theodore Roberts, Akim Tamiroff, and William Boyd. DeMille was credited by actor Edward G. Robinson with saving his career following his eclipse in the Hollywood blacklist.

=== Style and themes ===
Cecil B. DeMille's film production career evolved from critically significant silent films to financially significant sound films. He began his career with reserved yet brilliant melodramas; from there, his style developed into marital comedies with outrageously melodramatic plots. To attract a high-class audience, DeMille based many of his early films on stage melodramas, novels, and short stories. He began producing epics earlier in his career, but they solidified his career in the 1920s. By 1930, DeMille had perfected his film style of mass-interest spectacle films with Western, Roman, or Biblical themes. DeMille was often criticized for making his spectacles too colorful and for being too occupied with entertaining the audience rather than exploring the artistic and auteur possibilities that film could provide. However, others interpreted DeMille's work as visually impressive, thrilling, and nostalgic. Along the same lines, critics of DeMille often qualify him by his later spectacles and fail to consider several decades of ingenuity and energy that defined him during his generation. Throughout his career, he did not alter his films to better adhere to contemporary or popular styles. Actor Charlton Heston admitted DeMille was "terribly unfashionable" and Sidney Lumet called DeMille, "the cheap version of D. W. Griffith", adding that DeMille, "[didn't have]...an original thought in his head", though Heston added that DeMille was much more than that.

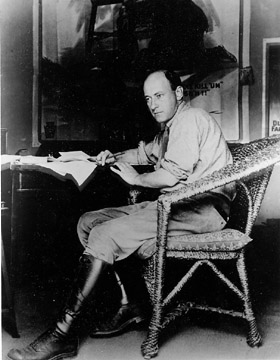
Cecil B. DeMille at Paramount Pictures

According to Scott Eyman, DeMille's films were at the same time masculine and feminine due to his thematic adventurousness and his eye for the extravagant. DeMille's distinctive style can be seen through camera and lighting effects as early as The Squaw Man with the use of daydream images; moonlight and sunset on a mountain; and side-lighting through a tent flap. In the early age of cinema, DeMille differentiated the Lasky Company from other production companies due to the use of dramatic, low-key lighting they called "Lasky lighting" and marketed as "Rembrandt lighting" to appeal to the public. DeMille achieved international recognition for his unique use of lighting and color tint in his film The Cheat. DeMille's 1956 version of The Ten Commandments, according to director Martin Scorsese, is renowned for its level of production and the care and detail that went into creating the film. He stated that The Ten Commandments was the final culmination of DeMille's style.

DeMille was interested in art, and his favorite artist was Gustave Doré; DeMille based some of his most well-known scenes on the work of Doré. DeMille was the first director to connect art to filmmaking; he created the title of "art director" on the film set. DeMille was also known for his use of special effects without the use of digital technology. Notably, DeMille had cinematographer John P. Fulton create the parting of the Red Sea scene in his 1956 film The Ten Commandments, which was one of the most expensive special effects in film history, and has been called by Steven Spielberg "the greatest special effect in film history". The actual parting of the sea was created by releasing 360,000 gallons of water into a huge water tank split by a U-shaped trough, overlaying it with a film of a giant waterfall that was built on the Paramount backlot, and playing the clip backward.

Aside from his Biblical and historical epics, which are concerned with how man relates to God, some of DeMille's films contained themes of "neo-naturalism", which portray the conflict between the laws of man and the laws of nature. Although he is known for his later "spectacular" films, his early films are held in high regard by critics and film historians. DeMille discovered the possibilities of the "bathroom" or "boudoir" in the film without being "vulgar" or "cheap". DeMille's films Male and Female, Why Change Your Wife? The Affairs of Anatol can be retrospectively described as high camp and are categorized as "early DeMille films" due to their particular style of production, costume, and set design. However, his earlier films, The Captive, Kindling, Carmen, and The Whispering Chorus are more serious films. It is difficult to typify DeMille's films into one specific genre. His first three films were Westerns, and he filmed many Westerns throughout his career. However, throughout his career, he filmed comedies, period and contemporary romances, dramas, fantasies, propaganda, Biblical spectacles, musical comedies, suspense, and war films. At least one DeMille film can represent each film genre. DeMille produced the majority of his films before the 1930s, and by the time sound films were invented, film critics saw DeMille as antiquated, with his best filmmaking years behind him.

DeMille's films contained many similar themes throughout his career. However, the films of his silent era were often thematically different from the films of his sound era. His silent-era films often included the "battle of the sexes" theme due to the era of women's suffrage and the enlarging role of women in society. Moreover, before his religious-themed films, many of his silent era films revolved around "husband-and-wife-divorce-and-remarry satires", considerably more adult-themed. According to Simon Louvish, these films reflected DeMille's inner thoughts and opinions about marriage and human sexuality. Religion was a theme that DeMille returned to throughout his career. Of his seventy films, five revolved around stories of the Bible and the New Testament; however, many others, while not direct retellings of Biblical stories, had themes of faith and religious fanaticism in films such as The Crusades and The Road to Yesterday. Western and frontier American themes were also themes that DeMille returned to throughout his career. His first several films were Westerns, and he produced a chain of Westerns during the sound era. Instead of portraying the danger and anarchy of the West, he portrayed the opportunity and redemption found in Western America. Another common theme in DeMille's films is the reversal of fortune and the portrayal of the rich and the poor, including the war of the classes and man versus society conflicts, such as in The Golden Chance and The Cheat. In relation to his own interests and sexual preferences, sadomasochism was a minor theme present in some of his films. Another minor characteristic of DeMille's films includes train crashes, which can be found in several of his films.

== Legacy ==
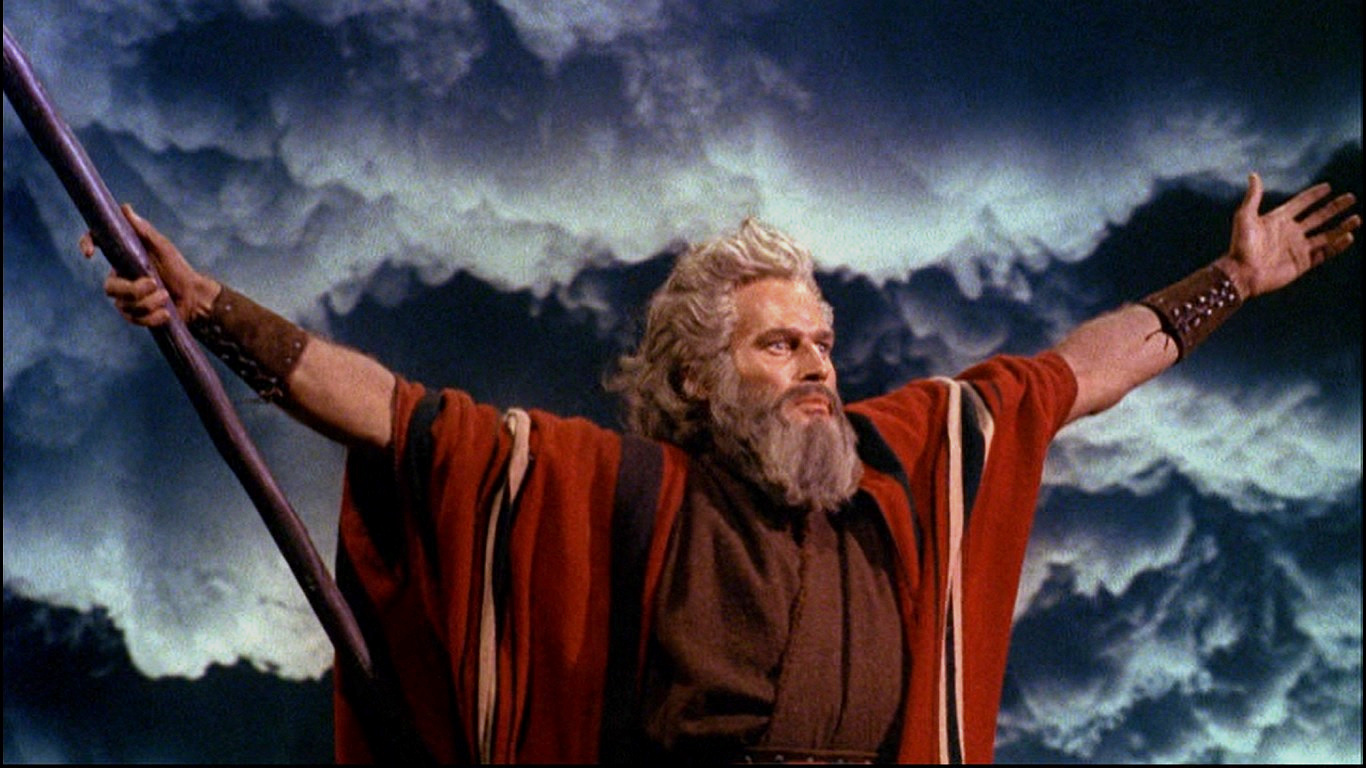
Charlton Heston as Moses in The Ten Commandments, which is the eighth highest-grossing film in the world, adjusted for inflation

Known as the father of the Hollywood motion picture industry, Cecil B. DeMille made 70 films, including several box-office hits. DeMille is one of the more commercially successful film directors in history, with his films before the release of The Ten Commandments estimated to have grossed $650 million worldwide. Adjusted for inflation, DeMille's remake of The Ten Commandments is the eighth highest-grossing film in the world.

According to Sam Goldwyn, critics did not like DeMille's films, but the audiences did, and "they have the final word". Similarly, scholar David Blanke argued that DeMille had lost the respect of his colleagues and film critics by the late stages of his film career. However, his final films demonstrated that DeMille was still respected by his audiences. Five of DeMille's films were the highest-grossing films of the year of their release, with only Spielberg topping him with six of his films as the highest-grossing films of the year. DeMille's highest-grossing films include: The Sign of the Cross (1932), Unconquered (1947), Samson and Delilah (1949), The Greatest Show on Earth (1952), and The Ten Commandments (1956). Director Ridley Scott has been called "the Cecil B. DeMille of the digital era" due to his classical and medieval epics.

Despite his box-office success, awards, and artistic achievements, DeMille has been dismissed and ignored by critics both during his life and posthumously. He was consistently criticized for producing shallow films without talent or artistic care. Compared to other directors, few film scholars have taken the time to academically analyze his films and style. During the French New Wave, critics began to categorize certain filmmakers as auteurs, such as Howard Hawks, John Ford, and Raoul Walsh. DeMille was omitted from the list, thought to be too unsophisticated and antiquated to be considered an auteur. However, Simon Louvish wrote "he was the complete master and auteur of his films", and Anton Kozlovic called him the "unsung American auteur". Andrew Sarris, a leading proponent of the auteur theory, ranked DeMille highly as an auteur in "Far Side of Paradise", just below the "Pantheon". Sarris added that despite the influence of the styles of contemporary directors throughout his career, DeMille's style remained unchanged. Robert Birchard wrote that one could argue the auteurship of DeMille on the basis that DeMille's thematic and visual style remained consistent throughout his career. However, Birchard acknowledged that Sarris's point was more likely that DeMille's style was behind the development of film as an art form. Meanwhile, Sumiko Higashi sees DeMille as "not only a figure who was shaped and influenced by the forces of his era but as a filmmaker who left his own signature on the culture industry." The critic Camille Paglia has called The Ten Commandments one of the ten greatest films of all time.

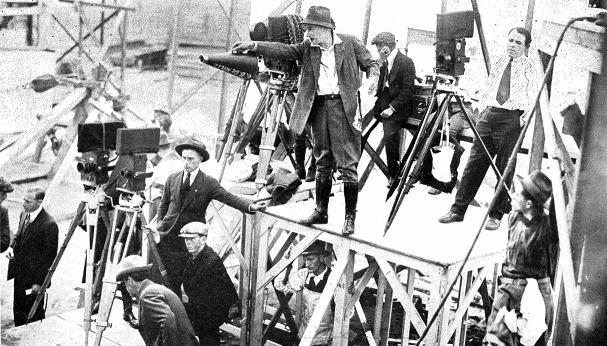
DeMille directing, 1920

DeMille was one of the first directors to become a celebrity in his own right. He cultivated the image of the omnipotent director, complete with megaphone, riding crop, and jodhpurs. He was known for his unique working wardrobe, which included riding boots, riding pants, and soft, open-necked shirts. Joseph Henabery recalled that DeMille looked like "a king on a throne surrounded by his court" while directing films on a camera platform.

DeMille was liked by some of his fellow directors and disliked by others, though his actual films were usually dismissed by his peers as a vapid spectacle. Director John Huston intensely disliked both DeMille and his films. "He was a thoroughly bad director", Huston said. "A dreadful showoff. Terrible. To diseased proportions." Said fellow director William Wellman: "Directorially, I think his pictures were the most horrible things I've ever seen in my life. But he put on pictures that made a fortune. In that respect, he was better than any of us." Producer David O. Selznick wrote: "There has appeared only one Cecil B. DeMille. He is one of the most extraordinarily able showmen of modern times. However much I may dislike some of his pictures, it would be very silly of me, as a producer of commercial motion pictures, to demean for an instant his unparalleled skill as a maker of mass entertainment." Salvador Dalí wrote that DeMille, Walt Disney, and the Marx Brothers were "the three great American Surrealists". DeMille appeared as himself in numerous films, including the MGM comedy Free and Easy. He often appeared in his coming-attraction trailers and narrated many of his later films, even stepping on screen to introduce The Ten Commandments. DeMille was immortalized in Billy Wilder's Sunset Boulevard when Gloria Swanson spoke the line: "All right, Mr. DeMille. I'm ready for my close-up." DeMille plays himself in the film. DeMille's reputation had a renaissance in the 2010s.

As a filmmaker, DeMille was the aesthetic inspiration of many directors and films due to his early influence during the crucial development of the film industry. DeMille's early silent comedies influenced the comedies of Ernst Lubitsch and Charlie Chaplin's A Woman of Paris. Additionally, DeMille's epics, such as The Crusades, influenced Sergei Eisenstein's Alexander Nevsky. Moreover, DeMille's epics inspired directors such as Howard Hawks, Nicholas Ray, Joseph L. Mankiewicz, and George Stevens to try producing epics. Cecil B. DeMille has influenced the work of several well-known directors. Alfred Hitchcock cited DeMille's 1921 film Forbidden Fruit as an influence on his work and one of his top ten favorite films. DeMille has influenced the careers of many modern directors. Martin Scorsese cited Unconquered, Samson and Delilah, and The Greatest Show on Earth as DeMille films that have imparted lasting memories on him. Scorsese said he had viewed The Ten Commandments forty or fifty times. Famed director Steven Spielberg stated that DeMille's The Greatest Show on Earth was one of the films that influenced him to become a filmmaker. Furthermore, DeMille influenced about half of Spielberg's films, including War of the Worlds. (Note: DeMille had considered making the film himself. He bought the rights to the novel in 1925 but abandoned the project in pre-production.) The Ten Commandments inspired DreamWorks Animation's later film about Moses, The Prince of Egypt. As one of the founding members of Paramount Pictures and co-founder of Hollywood, DeMille had a role in the development of the film industry. Consequently, the name "DeMille" has become synonymous with filmmaking.

Publicly Episcopalian, DeMille drew on his Christian and Jewish ancestors to convey a message of tolerance. DeMille received more than a dozen awards from Christian and Jewish religious and cultural groups, including B'nai B'rith. However, not everyone received DeMille's religious films favorably. DeMille was accused of antisemitism after the release of The King of Kings, and director John Ford despised DeMille for what he saw as "hollow" biblical epics meant to promote DeMille's reputation during the politically turbulent 1950s. In response to the claims, DeMille donated some of the profits from The King of Kings to charity. In the 2012 Sight & Sound poll, both DeMille's Samson and Delilah and the 1923 version of The Ten Commandments received votes, but did not make the top 100 films. Although many of DeMille's films are available on DVD and Blu-ray releases, only 20 of his silent films are commercially available on DVD. (Note: In the 1950s, Paramount sold its entire pre-1948 film library, including those of DeMille, to EMKA. Consequently, most of DeMille's pre-1948 films no longer belong to Paramount.)

=== Commemoration and tributes ===
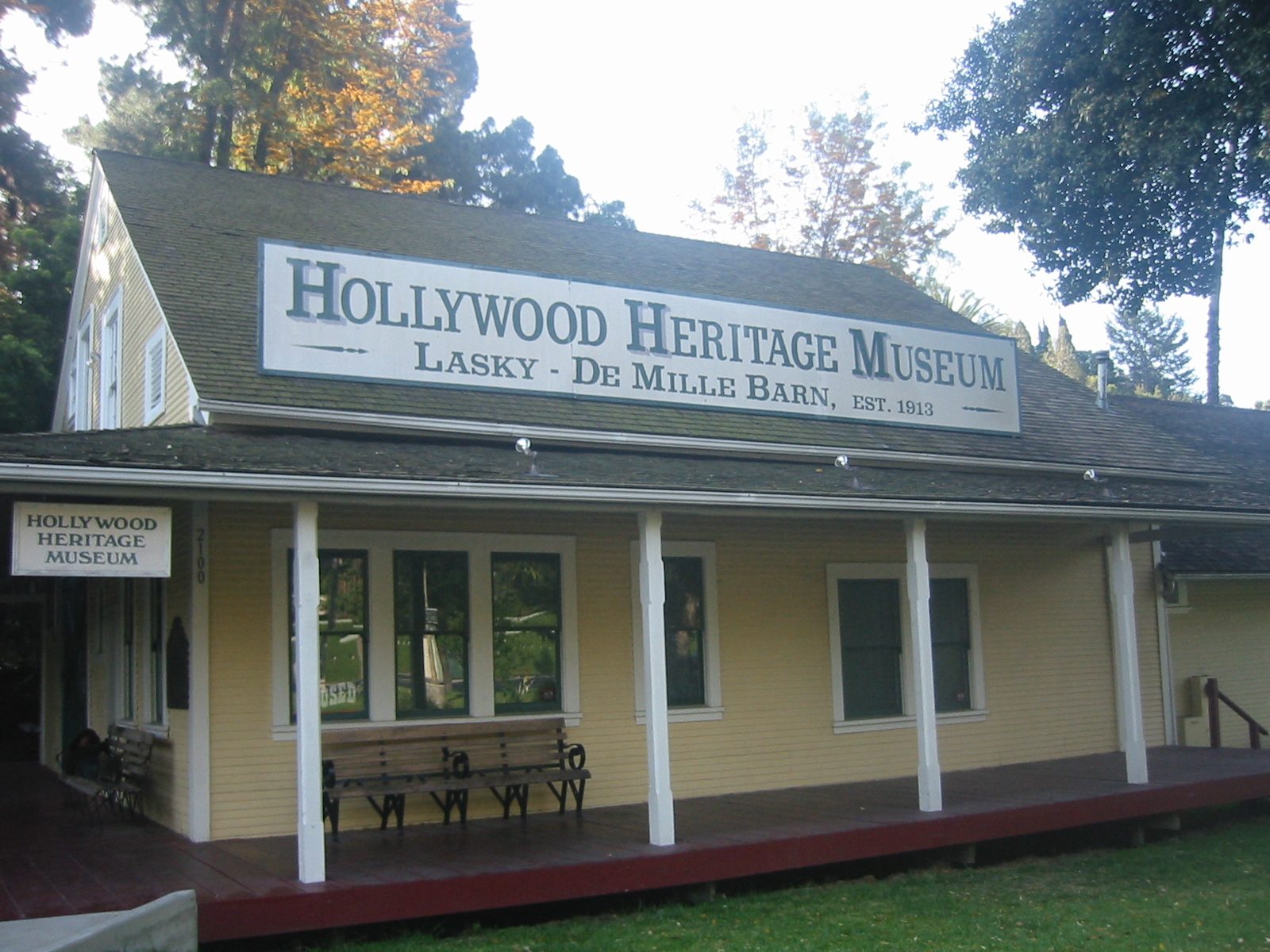
The Lasky-DeMille Barn was the place of origin of Paramount Pictures and the location in which The Squaw Man (1913) was filmed. It became the Hollywood Heritage Museum in 1985.

The original Lasky-DeMille Barn, in which The Squaw Man was filmed, was converted into a museum named the "Hollywood Heritage Museum". It opened on December 13, 1985, and features some of DeMille's personal artifacts. The Lasky-DeMille Barn was dedicated as a California historical landmark in a ceremony on December 27, 1956; DeMille was the keynote speaker. It was listed on the National Register of Historic Places in 2014. The Dunes Center in Guadalupe, California, contains an exhibition of artifacts uncovered in the desert near Guadalupe from DeMille's set of his 1923 version of The Ten Commandments, known as the "Lost City of Cecil B. DeMille". (Note: The set was discovered by Peter Brosnan after hearing a rumor in 1982 that DeMille had ordered the enormous set to be buried after filming rather than taken away. A documentary titled The Lost City of Cecil B. DeMille follows the story of Brosnan's 30-year journey to find and uncover the set.) Donated by the Cecil B. DeMille Foundation in 2004, the moving image collection of Cecil B. DeMille is held at the Academy Film Archive and includes home movies, outtakes, and never-before-seen test footage.

In summer 2019, The Friends of the Pompton Lakes Library hosted a Cecil B. DeMille film festival to celebrate DeMille's achievements and connection to Pompton Lakes. They screened four of his films at Christ Church, where DeMille and his family attended church when they lived there. Two schools have been named after him: Cecil B. DeMille Middle School, in Long Beach, California, which was closed and demolished in 2010 to make way for a new high school, and Cecil B. DeMille Elementary School in Midway City, California. The former film building at Chapman University in Orange, California, is named in honor of DeMille. During the Apollo 11 mission, Buzz Aldrin referred to himself in one instance as "Cecil B. DeAldrin", as a humorous nod to DeMille. The title of the 2000 John Waters film Cecil B. Demented alludes to DeMille.

DeMille's legacy is maintained by his granddaughter Cecilia DeMille Presley, who serves as the president of the Cecil B. DeMille Foundation, which strives to support higher education, child welfare, and film in Southern California. In 1963, the Cecil B. DeMille Foundation donated the "Paradise" ranch to the Hathaway Foundation, which cares for emotionally disturbed and abused children. A large collection of DeMille's materials, including scripts, storyboards, and films, resides at Brigham Young University in L. Tom Perry Special Collections.

== Awards and recognition ==
Cecil B. DeMille received many awards and honors, especially later in his career.

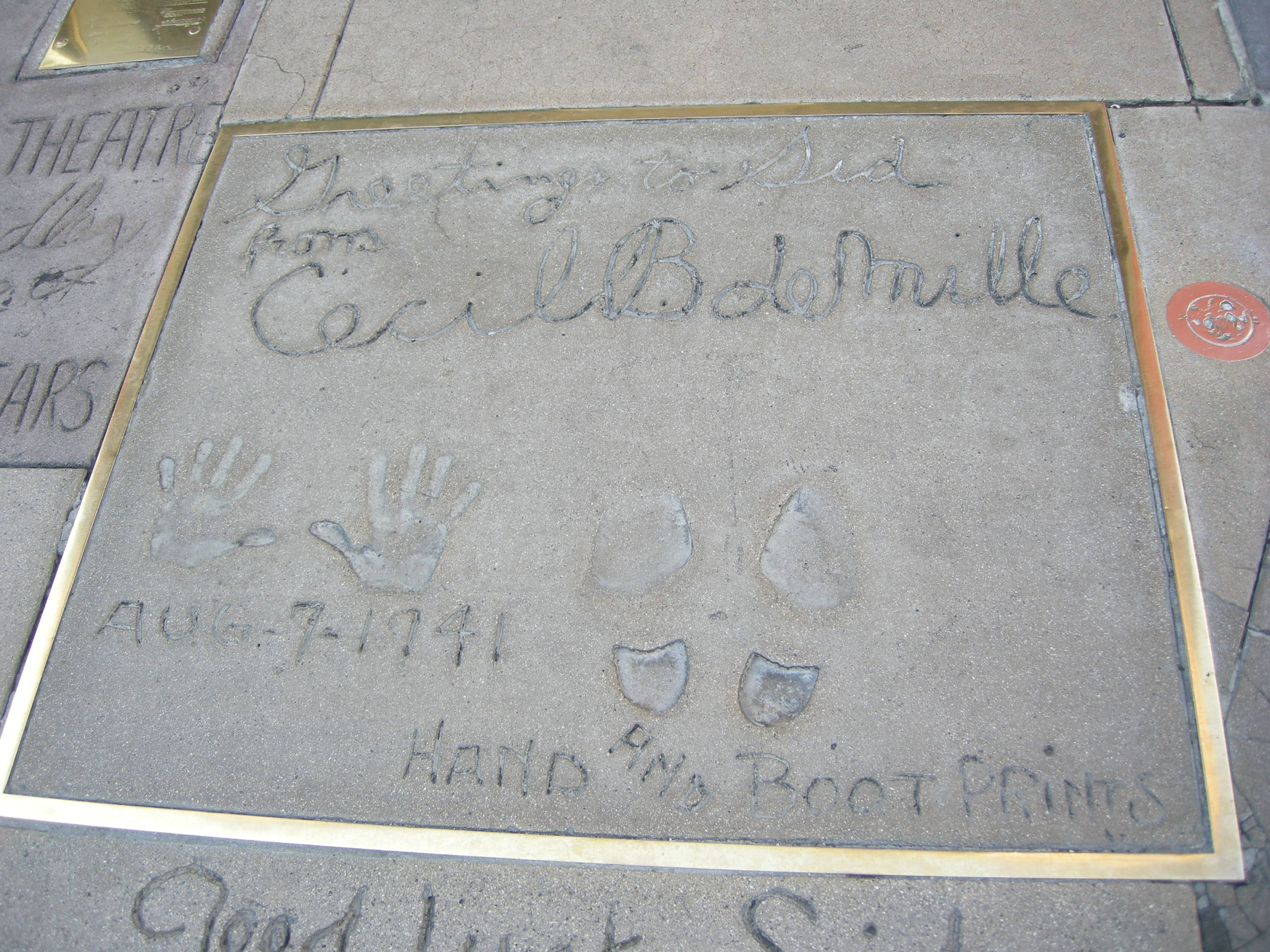
DeMille's block in the forecourt of Grauman's Chinese Theatre.

In August 1941, DeMille was honored with a block in the forecourt of Grauman's Chinese Theatre.

In 1950, DeMille's The Ten Commandments (1923) was named one of the ten "best directorial achievements of the last half-century" in a Screen Directors Guild poll of film critics.

The American Academy of Dramatic Arts honored DeMille with an Alumni Achievement Award in 1958.

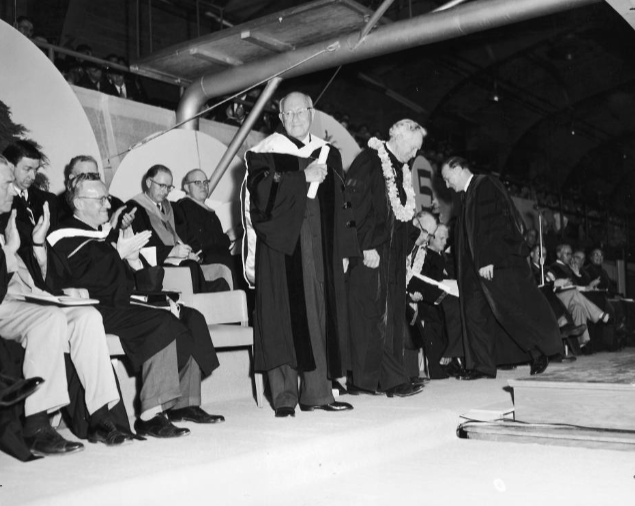
DeMille (middle, standing) receives an Honorary Doctorate degree at Brigham Young University commencement, 1957

In 1957, DeMille gave the commencement address for the graduation ceremony of Brigham Young University, wherein he received an honorary Doctorate of Letter degree. Additionally, in 1958, he received an honorary Doctorate of Law degree from Temple University.

From the film industry, DeMille received the Irving G. Thalberg Memorial Award at the Academy Awards in 1953, and a Lifetime Achievement Award from the Directors Guild of America Award the same year. In the same ceremony, DeMille received a nomination from the Directors Guild of America Award for Outstanding Directorial Achievement in Motion Pictures for The Greatest Show on Earth. In 1952, DeMille was awarded the first Cecil B. DeMille Award at the Golden Globes. An annual award, the Golden Globe's Cecil B. DeMille Award recognizes lifetime achievement in the film industry. (Note: Later recipients of the award include Kirk Douglas, Robert Redford, Lauren Bacall. Jeff Bridges was the 2019 Cecil B. DeMille Award winner.) For his contribution to the motion picture and radio industry, DeMille has two stars on the Hollywood Walk of Fame. The first, for radio contributions, is located at 6240 Hollywood Blvd. The second star is located at 1725 Vine Street.

DeMille received two Academy Awards: an Honorary Award for "37 years of brilliant showmanship" in 1950 and a Best Picture award in 1953 for The Greatest Show on Earth. DeMille received a Golden Globe Award for Best Director and was additionally nominated for the Best Director category at the 1953 Academy Awards for the same film. He was further nominated in the Best Picture category for The Ten Commandments at the 1957 Academy Awards. DeMille's Union Pacific received a Palme d'Or in retrospect at the 2002 Cannes Film Festival.

Six DeMille films were ranked among the Ten Best Pictures of the Year in The Film Daily's annual poll: The Ten Commandments in 1924, The Volga Boatman in 1926, The King of Kings in 1928, The Story of Dr. Wassell in 1944, The Greatest Show on Earth in 1952, and The Ten Commandments in 1956.

Two of DeMille's films have been selected for preservation in the National Film Registry by the United States Library of Congress: The Cheat (1915) and The Ten Commandments (1956).

== Filmography ==
DeMille made 70 features, 52 of which are silent. The first 24 of his silents were produced during the first three years of his career (1913–1916). Eight of his films were "epics" with five classified as "Biblical". Six of DeMille's films — The Arab, The Wild Goose Chase, The Dream Girl, The Devil-Stone, We Can't Have Everything, and The Squaw Man (1918) — were destroyed by nitrate decomposition and are considered lost. The Ten Commandments is broadcast every Saturday at Passover in the United States on the ABC Television Network.

=== Directed features ===
Filmography obtained from Fifty Hollywood Directors.

==== Silent films ====
All films shown below entered the public domain in 2024.

Year	Title	Preservation status
1914	The Squaw Man	
1914	The Call of the North	George Eastman House
1914	The Virginian	
1914	What's His Name	George Eastman House
1914	The Man from Home	Library of Congress
1914	Rose of the Rancho	George Eastman House and Library of Congress
1915	Carmen	George Eastman House, Gosfilmofond, the Museum of Modern Art and the BFI. The MoMA and Eastman prints are on 35 mm film.
1915	The Girl of the Golden West	George Eastman House, Library of Congress, Cineteca del Friuli, and Academy Film Archive.
1915	After Five	Lost
1915	The Warrens of Virginia	George Eastman House
1915	The Unafraid	George Eastman House
1915	The Captive	Thought lost until 1970, found in the Paramount Pictures Vault and later donated to the Library of Congress, where the complete 35 mm copy is now held.
1915	The Wild Goose Chase	Lost
1915	The Arab	Lost
1915	Chimmie Fadden	Cinemateket-Svenska Filminstitutet in Stockholm
1915	Kindling	Lost
1915	Chimmie Fadden Out West	George Eastman House
1915	The Cheat	
1915	Temptation	Lost
1915	The Golden Chance	George Eastman House
1916	The Trail of the Lonesome Pine	Library of Congress and George Eastman House
1916	The Heart of Nora Flynn	George Eastman House
1916	Maria Rosa	George Eastman House and BFI National Film and Television
1916	The Dream Girl	Lost
1916	Joan the Woman	Archives du Film du CNC (35 mm), George Eastman House (35 mm), Academy Film Archive, and British Film Institute
1917	A Romance of the Redwoods	George Eastman House
1917	The Little American	Cineteca Del Friuli (16 mm film), George Eastman House (35 mm), Library of Congress (35 mm and 16 mm), UCLA Film & Television Archive and Pickford Center for Motion Picture Study (35 mm)
1917	The Woman God Forgot	George Eastman House and the Cineteca Del Friuli
1917	The Devil-Stone	Incomplete: 2/6 reels survive at Library of Congress
1918	The Whispering Chorus	George Eastman House (35 mm), the UCLA Film & Television Archive, the Academy Film Archive, and the BFI
1918	Old Wives for New	Academy Film Archive and the George Eastman House
1918	We Can't Have Everything	Lost
1918	Till I Come Back to You	George Eastman House
1918	The Squaw Man	Prints exist in the George Eastman Museum film archive [incomplete 35mm positive, incomplete 16mm positive]
1919	Don't Change Your Husband	George Eastman House (35 mm), Cinémathèque Québécoise (35 mm), Cinematheque Royale de Belgique, Swedish Film Institute, Archives du Film du CNC, and Library of Congress
1919	For Better, for Worse	George Eastman House
1919	Male and Female	
1920	Why Change Your Wife?	George Eastman House
1920	Something to Think About	George Eastman House and the EYE Filmmuseum
1921	Forbidden Fruit	George Eastman House, Library of Congress (35 mm), MoMA, UCLA Film and Television Archive, and Gosfilmofond
1921	The Affairs of Anatol	Cinematheque Royale de Belgique, Munich Film Archive, Filmoteka Narodowa, George Eastman House (35 mm), Library of Congress (35 mm, 16 mm, video), UCLA Film & Television Archive, on 35 and 16 mm, and Gosfilmofond
1921	Fool's Paradise	Public domain; George Eastman House (35 mm), Library of Congress (35 mm), UCLA Film & Television Archive (35 mm, 16 mm)
1922	Saturday Night	Public domain; Cinematheque Royale de Belgique, George Eastman House (35 mm), EYE Filmmuseum, UCLA Film and Television Archive (35 mm film), Academy Film Archive (video), and Indiana University Bloomington (16 mm)
1922	Manslaughter	Public domain; George Eastman House (35 mm, 16 mm), Library of Congress (35 mm, 16 mm), MoMA, EYE Filmmuseum, and The Paul Killiam Collection at Worldview Entertainment
1923	Adam's Rib	Public domain; George Eastman House
1923	The Ten Commandments	Public domain
1924	Triumph	Library of Congress (35 mm) and George Eastman House
1924	Feet of Clay	Lost
1925	The Golden Bed	George Eastman House (35 mm, 16 mm)
1925	The Road to Yesterday	Public domain; Library of Congress (35 mm), George Eastman House, UCLA Film and Television Archive (35 mm, 16 mm), and Academy Film Archive
1926	The Volga Boatman	Public domain; George Eastman House (35 mm). Cineteca Nazionale (35 mm), UCLA Film and Television Archive (35 mm), and BFI
1927	The King of Kings	Public domain; Cinematheque Royale de Belgique, Cineteca Del Friuli (16 mm), George Eastman House, Library of Congress (35 mm), Cineteca Nazionale (35 mm), Arhiva Națională de Filme, UCLA Film and Television Archive (35 mm, LaserDisc), BFI, and Yugoslav Film Archive
1928	The Godless Girl	Public domain; UCLA Film and Television Archive

Sound films

Year	Title	Notes
1929	Dynamite	
1930	Madam Satan	
1931	The Squaw Man	Remake of his 1918 silent film
1932	The Sign of the Cross	
1933	This Day and Age	
1934	Four Frightened People	
1934	Cleopatra	
1935	The Crusades	
1936	The Plainsman	
1938	The Buccaneer	
1939	Union Pacific	
1940	North West Mounted Police	
1942	Reap the Wild Wind	
1944	The Story of Dr. Wassell	
1947	Unconquered	
1949	Samson and Delilah	
1952	The Greatest Show on Earth	
1956	The Ten Commandments	Remake of his 1923 silent film

=== Other production credits ===
These are films which DeMille produced or assisted in directing, credited or uncredited.

- Brewster's Millions (1914, lost)
- The Master Mind (1914, lost)
- The Only Son (1914, lost)
- The Man on the Box (1914)
- The Ghost Breaker (1914, lost)
- After Five (1915)
- Nan of Music Mountain (1917)
- Chicago (1927, Producer, uncredited)
- When Worlds Collide (1951, executive producer)
- The War of the Worlds (1953, executive producer)
- The Buccaneer (1958, producer)

=== Acting and cameos ===
DeMille frequently made cameos as himself in other Paramount films. Additionally, he often starred in prologues and special trailers that he created for his films, given the opportunity to personally address the audience.

- The Squaw Man (1914) as Faro Dealer (uncredited)
- Hollywood (1923) as Himself
- Free and Easy (1930) as Himself
- Estrellados (1930) as Himself (Guest Appearance)
- Madam Satan (1930) as Radio Newscaster (voice, uncredited)
- The Last Train from Madrid (1937) as Crowd Member (uncredited)
- North West Mounted Police (1940) as Narrator (voice, uncredited)
- Glamour Boy (1941) as Movie Director (uncredited)
- Reap the Wild Wind (1942) as Prologue Speaker (voice, uncredited)
- Star Spangled Rhythm (1942) as Himself
- The Story of Dr. Wassell (1944) as Narrator (uncredited)
- Variety Girl (1947) as Himself
- Unconquered (1947) as Narrator (uncredited)
- Jens Mansson in America (1947) as Himself
- Samson and Delilah (1949) as Narrator (uncredited)
- Sunset Boulevard (1950) as Himself
- The Greatest Show on Earth (1952) as Narrator (voice, uncredited)
- Son of Paleface (1952) as Photographer (uncredited)
- The Ten Commandments (1956) as Himself (film introduction) and Narrator (uncredited)
- The Buster Keaton Story (1957) as Himself
- The Buccaneer (1958) as Himself - Prologue (uncredited) (final film role)

== General sources ==
- Abel, Richard, ed. (2005). Encyclopedia of Early Cinema. London: Routledge. ISBN 978-0415234405.
- American Film Institute (1997). Gevinson, Alan (ed.). Within Our Gates: Ethnicity in American Feature Film, 1911–1960. Berkeley: University of California Press. ISBN 978-0520209640.
- Birchard, Robert S. (2004). Cecil B. DeMille's Hollywood. University Press of Kentucky. ISBN 978-0813123240.
- Blanke, David (2018). Cecil B. DeMille, Classical Hollywood, and Modern American Mass Culture. London: Palgrave Macmillan. doi:10.1007/978-3-319-76986-8. ISBN 978-3319769868.
- Dick, Bernard F. (2001). Engulfed: The Death of Paramount Pictures and the Birth of Corporate Hollywood. Lexington: University Press of Kentucky. ISBN 978-0813122021.
- Doherty, Thomas (1999). Pre-Code Hollywood: Sex, Immorality, and Insurrection in American Cinema, 1930–1934. New York: Columbia University Press. p. 26. ISBN 0231110952. "demille madam satan destruction of an airship."
- Eames, John Douglas (1985). The Paramount Story. New York: Crown Publishers, Inc. ISBN 0517553481.
- Edmonds, I.G.; Mimura, Reiko (1980). Paramount Pictures and the People Who Made Them. San Diego: A.S. Barnes & Company, Inc. ISBN 978-0498023224.
- Eyman, Scott (2010). Empire of Dreams: The Epic Life of Cecil B. DeMille. New York: Simon & Schuster. ISBN 978-0743289559.
- Higashi, Sumiko (1994). Cecil B. DeMille and American Culture: The Silent Era. Berkeley: University of California Press. ISBN 0520085574.
- Highman, Charles (1973). Cecil B. DeMille. New York: Da Capo Press. ISBN 0306801310.
- King, Elliot H. (2007). Dalí, Surrealism and Cinema. Harpenden, UK: Kamera Books. ISBN 978-1904048909.
- Louvish, Simon (2007). Cecil B. DeMille: A Life in Art. New York: Thomas Dunne Books. ISBN 978-0312377335.
- Lyon, Christopher, ed. (1984). The International Dictionary of Films and Filmmakers: Directors/Filmmakers (Volume II). Chicago: St. James Press. ISBN 978-0912289052.
- Orrison, Katherine. Written in Stone: Making Cecil B. DeMille's Epic, The Ten Commandments. New York: Vestal Press, 1990. ISBN 187951124X.
- Maltin, Leonard, ed. (2009). Leonard Maltin's 2009 Movie Guide. New York: Plume. p. 492. ISBN 978-0452289789. "free and easy film."
- Presley, Cecilia DeMille; Vieira, Mark A. (2014). Cecil B. DeMille: The Art of Hollywood Epic. Philadelphia: Running Press. ISBN 978-0762454907.
- Ringgold, Gene; Bodeen, DeWitt (1969). The Films of Cecil B. DeMille. New York: Citadel Press.
- Soister, John T.; Nicolella, Henry (2012). American Silent Horror, Science Fiction, and Fantasy Feature Films, 1913–1929. Jefferson, NC: McFarland & Company. ISBN 978-0786435814.
- Williams, Tony (2014). Larry Cohen: The Radical Allegories of an Independent Filmmaker. Jefferson, NC: McFarland & Company. ISBN 978-1476618197.
