= Simon Louvish =

Israeli writer and filmmaker

- סיימון לוביש
- Born: April 6, 1947 (age 79); Glasgow, Scotland
- Occupation: Novelist

Simon Louvish (Hebrew: סיימון לוביש; born 6 April 1947, Glasgow, Scotland) is a Scots-born Israeli author, writer and filmmaker. He has written many books about Avram Blok, a fictional Israeli caught up between wars, espionage, prophets, revolutions, loves, and a few near apocalypses.

Louvish is a visiting lecturer in Screen Studies at the London Film School. He has written books on W. C. Fields, The Marx Brothers, Groucho Marx, Laurel and Hardy, Mae West, Cecil B. DeMille, Mack Sennett and Charlie Chaplin.

Louvish directed and produced such documentaries as End of the Dialogue, Apartheid in South Africa, Greece of Christian Greeks – the Colonels' Regime, and To Live in Freedom, the Conflict in Israel-Palestine.

== Publications ==
The Avram Blok Saga

- Louvish, Simon (1985). The Therapy of Avram Blok. Vol. 1. Heinemann. ISBN 0434429708.
- —— (1988). City of Blok. Vol. 2. Collins.
- —— (1991). The Last Trump of Avram Blok. Vol. 3. Flamingo. ISBN 0006543405.
- —— (1997). The Days of Miracles and Wonders. Vol. 4.
- ——. The Fundamental Blok. Vol. 5 (unpublished ed.). Margaret Macdonald Books.
- ——. The Chinese Smile. Vol. 6 (unpublished ed.). Margaret Macdonald Books.

Fiction

- —— (1979). A Moment Of Silence. ISBN 0856161314.
- —— (1987). Death of Moishe-Ganef. Corgi. ISBN 0552992860.
- —— (1990). Your Monkey's Shmuck. Flamingo. ISBN 0006543464.
- —— (1992). Resurrections from the Dustbin of History. Bloomsbury. ISBN 0747511918.
- —— (1994). Resurrections. Da Capo Press. ISBN 1568580142.
- —— (1995). What's Up God?: A Romance of the Apocalypse. W&N. ISBN 057505994X.
- —— (1997). The Silencer. Interlink Books. ISBN 1566561167.
- —— (1999). The Cosmic Follies. Institute of Contemporary Arts. ISBN 1900300419.

Non-fiction

- —— (1994). It's a Gift. BFI Publishing. ISBN 0851704727.
- —— (1997). The Man on the Flying Trapeze - the Life & Times of W C Fields. W. W. Norton & Co. ISBN 0393041271.
- —— (1999). Monkey Business: The Lives and Legends of the Marx Brothers. Faber & Faber. ISBN 0571193501. OCLC 42912991.
- —— (2003). KEYSTONE The Life and Clowns of Mack Sennett. Faber & Faber. ISBN 057121276X.
- —— (2002). Stan and Ollie: The Roots Of Comedy. Faber & Faber. ISBN 0571215904.
- —— (2006). Mae West: It Ain't No Sin. Faber & Faber. ISBN 0571219497.
- —— (2007). Coffee With Groucho. Duncan Baird. ISBN 978-1844834693.
- —— (2007). Cecil B. DeMille and the Golden Calf. Faber & Faber. ISBN 978-0571229000.
  - Also published (2008) as Cecil B. DeMille: A Life in Art
- —— (2009). Chaplin: The Tramp's Odyssey. Faber & Faber. ISBN 978-0571237685.
