= The Whispering Chorus =

1918 film

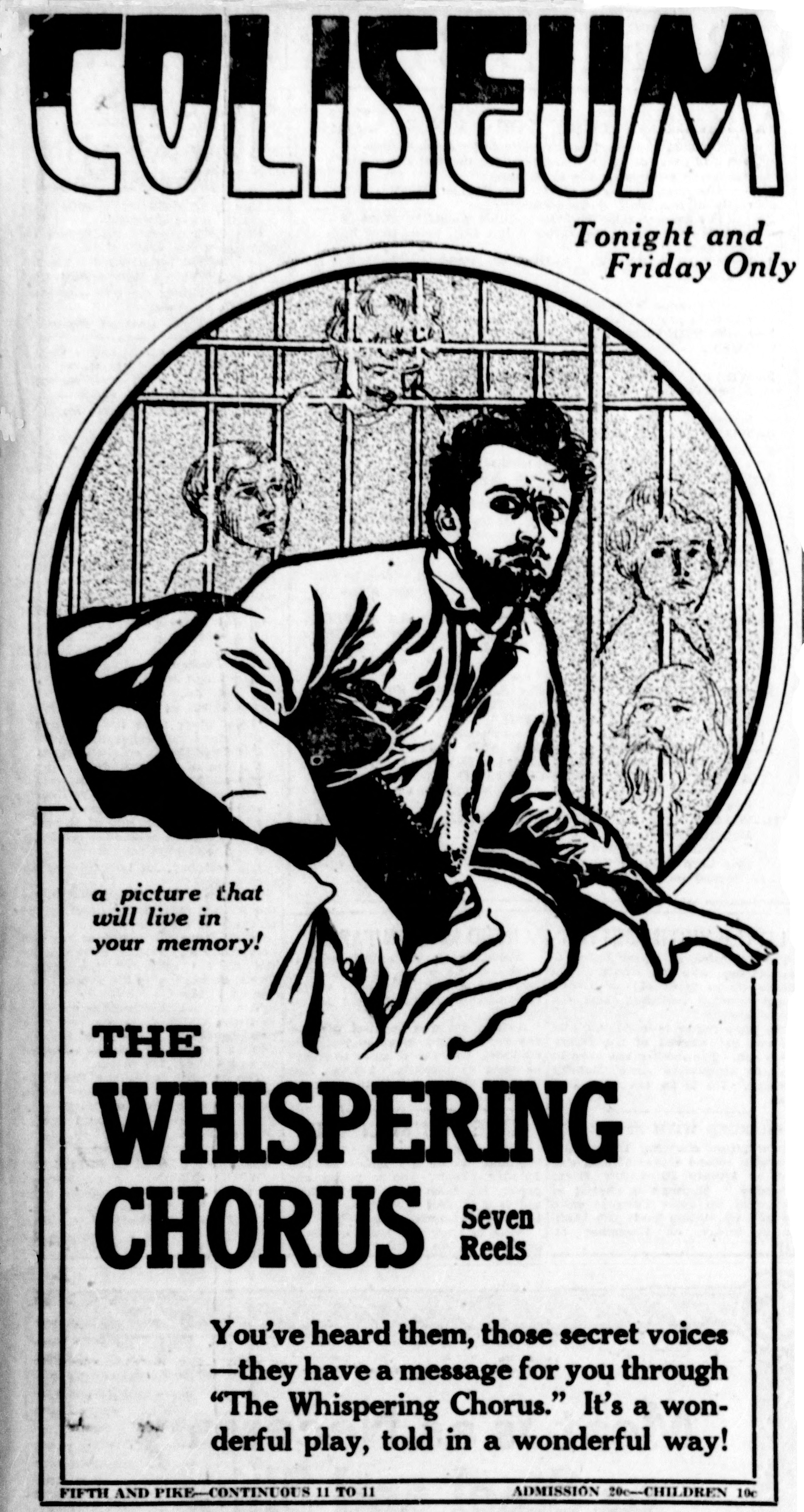
- Newspaper advertisement
- Directed by: Cecil B. DeMille
- Written by: Jeanie MacPherson
- Based on: "The Whispering Chorus" (1918 short story) by Perley Poore Sheehan
- Produced by: Cecil B. DeMille
- Starring: Raymond Hatton
- Cinematography: Alvin Wyckoff
- Edited by: Cecil B. DeMille
- Production company: Famous Players–Lasky/Artcraft
- Distributed by: Paramount Pictures
- Release date: March 25, 1918
- Running time: 86 minutes
- Country: United States
- Language: Silent (English intertitles)

The film

The Whispering Chorus is a 1918 American silent psychological drama film directed by Cecil B. DeMille. It is the first and earliest film considered a psychological drama.

== Plot ==
John Tremble, an impoverished cashier in a contracting concern, listens to the voice of evil and succumbs to temptation, stealing $1000 from his employer. When he begins to fear detection, he runs away and hides on an isolated island where he becomes a piece of human driftwood. While fishing he finds the body of a dead man and, again listening to the voice of evil, he exchanges clothes and then mutilates the head of the corpse, to suggest he himself has been murdered. The finding of the body is reported to his family and Tremble begins life anew. The police search for the murderer and Tremble is finally brought to trial. Meanwhile, Jane Tremble, his former wife, has married the state governor and does not recognize John Tremble when she sees him in court. After a dramatic trial, John Tremble is found guilty of his own murder. He nobly meets death in the electric chair rather than bring unhappiness to his former wife.

== Cast ==
- Raymond Hatton as John Tremble
- Kathlyn Williams as Jane Tremble
- Edythe Chapman as John Tremble's mother
- Elliott Dexter as George Coggeswell
- Noah Beery as Longshoreman
- Guy Oliver as Chief McFarland
- John Burton as Charles Barden
- Tully Marshall as F.P. Clumley
- William H. Brown as Stauberry
- James Neill as Channing
- Gustav von Seyffertitz as Mocking Face
- Walter Lynch as Evil Face
- Edna Mae Cooper as Good Face
- Julia Faye as Girl in Shanghai Dive (uncredited)
- Jack Mulhall as Priest (uncredited)
- Charles Ogle as Judge (uncredited)

== Reception ==
Like many American films of the time, The Whispering Chorus was subject to cuts by city and state film censorship boards. For example, the Chicago Board of Censors cut, in Reel 2, a closeup of the alteration of the ledger, theft of money, Reel 4, striking man in face with bottle, two scenes of young woman in kimono enticing man and pulling him towards room, Reel 5, policeman striking man in face twice, and, Reel 7, two scenes of pulling lever for electric chair.

== Preservation ==
Complete prints of The Whispering Chorus are held by the George Eastman Museum (on 35 mm film), the UCLA Film and Television Archive, the Academy Film Archive and the BFI.

== See also ==
- The House That Shadows Built (1931 promotional film by Paramount)
