= Alvin Wyckoff =

American cinematographer

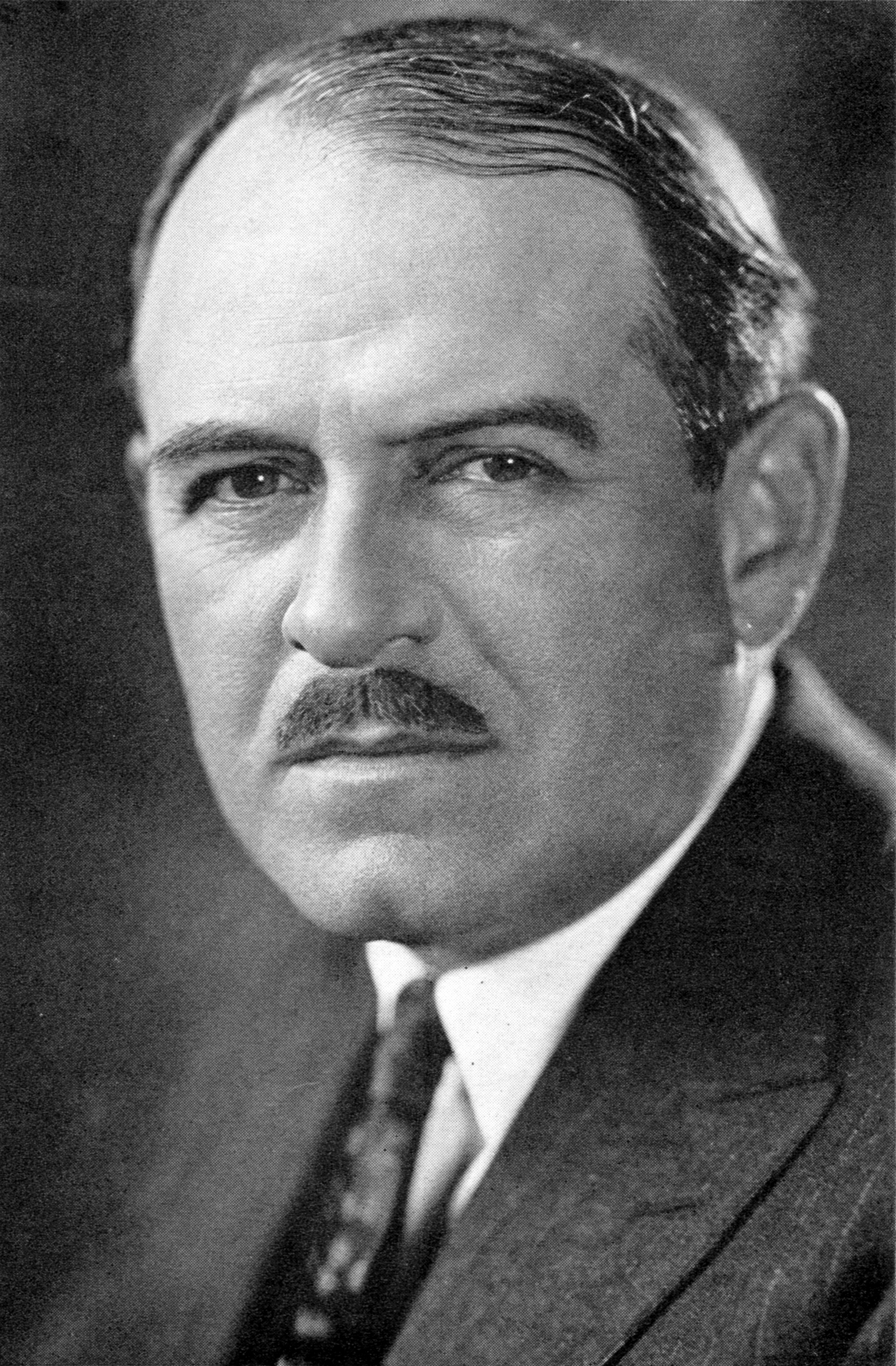
- Alvin Wyckoff, 1942
- Born: July 3, 1877; New York City, New York, US
- Died: July 30, 1957 (aged 80); Los Angeles, California, US
- Occupation: Cinematographer
- Years active: 1914–1945

Alvin Wyckoff (July 3, 1877 – July 30, 1957) was an American cinematographer who worked on more than 80 films between 1914 and 1945.

Several of Wyckoff's films had sequences filmed in the early Handschiegl color process, originally billed as the "DeMille-Wyckoff Process". Wyckoff also worked with DeMille to develop the Lasky-lighting technique, which made selective lighting possible.

== Partial filmography ==
- The Count of Monte Cristo (1912) (*as actor)
- The Spoilers (1914)
- The Man From Home (1914)
- Rose of the Rancho (1914)
- What's His Name (1914)
- The Virginian (1914)
- The Cheat (1915)
- Carmen (1915)
- The Captive (1915)
- Temptation (1915)
- The Arab (1915)
- Chimmie Fadden (1915)
- Kindling (1915)
- The Wild Goose Chase (1915)
- Joan the Woman (1916)
- The Heart of Nora Flynn (1916)
- The Dream Girl (1916)
- The Trail of the Lonesome Pine (1916)
- The Devil-Stone (1917)
- The Little American (1917)
- The Whispering Chorus (1918)
- We Can't Have Everything (1918)
- Male and Female (1919)
- For Better, for Worse (1919)
- Why Change Your Wife? (1920)
- Fool's Paradise (1921)
- The Affairs of Anatol (1921)
- Manslaughter (1922)
- Blood and Sand (1922)
- Strangers of the Night (1923)
- Adam's Rib (1923)
- Men (1924)
- The Border Legion (1924)
- Lily of the Dust (1924)
- When a Girl Loves (1924)
- The Swan (1925)
- The Lucky Devil (1925)
- Irish Luck (1925)
- The New Klondike (1926)
- It's the Old Army Game (1926)
- Tin Gods (1926)
- The Canadian (1926)
- Blind Alleys (1927)
- If I Had a Million (1932)
- The Mystery Squadron (1933)
- The Lost Jungle (1934)
