= Wilfred Buckland =

American art director (1866–1946)

- Born: April 18, 1866
- Died: July 18, 1946 (aged 80)
- Occupation: Art director
- Years active: 1914 - 1927

Wilfred Buckland (April 18, 1866 – July 18, 1946) was an American art director. Buckland worked as an art director with Cecil B. DeMille and Jesse Lasky, and later with Alan Dwan, from 1914 to 1927. He was Hollywood's first "art director" and is credited with a number of advancements in filmmaking, including the advances in lighting techniques, the development of architectural sets, and the use of miniature sets. In 1924, he was named one of the ten individuals who had contributed the most to the advancement of the motion picture industry since the time of its inception. A 1980 exhibition at the Victoria and Albert Museum in London advanced the argument that "everything we know as 'Hollywood' traces to Wilfred Buckland." Buckland was among the first inductees in the Art Directors Guild Hall of Fame.

== Early years ==
Buckland was born in New York City, the son of Reverend Rabbi Joseph Wales and Emily (Wilson) Buckland. He worked as an artist for a time and was responsible for much of the interior decoration and paintings of New York's Trinity Church for its bi-centenary celebration in 1897. He also worked with the stage producer, David Belasco, for many years. In 1907, The New York Times described Buckland as the "general stage manager" for Belasco. He designed the color scheme, draperies and stage curtain at Belasco's Stuyvesant Theatre (now operating as the Belasco Theatre) that opened in 1907. In 1910, Buckland was described as Belasco's "art director," responsible for the design of scenery, costumes and other artistic details. One newspaper reviewer wrote the following about the sets designed by Buckland for the stage production of Omar, the Tentmaker: "Pictorially nothing finer has ever been disclosed upon the stage than the succession of sumptuous Oriental pictures evolved for the production by Wilfred Buckland, who for 10 years served as art decorator for David Belasco."

Buckland's Broadway credits include The Rose of the Rancho (scenic design, 1907), A Grand Army Man (scenic design, 1907), Adrea (stage director and scenic design, 1905), The Music Master (scenic design, 1904), The Darling of the Gods (design, 1903), and Du Barry (design, 1901).

== Work with DeMille ==
Cecil B. DeMille brought the 47-year-old Buckland to Hollywood to work on his film The Squaw Man (1914). According to some accounts, producer Jesse L. Lasky purchased the movie rights to Belasco's plays, and Buckland's services as art director were part of the deal. Buckland continued to work with DeMille on most of his projects until 1920 and also worked on most of the films produced by Jesse Lasky's Famous Players–Lasky production company. While working with DeMille and Lasky, Buckland was credited with the introduction of artificial lighting to motion pictures with the use of klieg lights, which also became known as "Lasky lighting." Jesse Lasky later wrote of Buckland: "As the first bona fide art director in the industry, and the first to build architectural settings for films, Buckland widened the scope of pictures tremendously by throwing off the scenic limitations of the stage."

Buckland was a collector of ancient firearms. In 1916, The Democrat-Tribune newspaper commented that Buckland, "art director of the Lasky Company," was also "known as the greatest collector and authority on ancient firearms in the country," and his collection was said to be "the most complete in the world, not barring that of the British Museum."

Buckland developed a reputation as one of the early film industry's great artists, as reflected in the following 1918 newspaper report:

"Among the producing firms who belong to the class where imagination is based upon culture, are those associated with Paramount. For a long time, now, picture play reviewers have been fond of saying 'up to the usual Paramount standard.' That standard to a large extent has been raised higher and higher by the Wilfred Buckland whose name appears in front of all the Lasky pictures. Such men as Cecil DeMille, William DeMille, J. Searle Dawley, Maurice Tourneur, Joseph Kaufman, Robert Vignola, Robert Thorley, Marshal Neilan, Thomas H. Ince, J. Stuart Blackton and the others who produce for Paramount have added their very considerable bit to spelling Art with a capital A in motion pictures, but that is Wilfred Buckland's business exclusively."

Similarly, in 1920, a reviewer noted that the "wonderful interior settings for Don't Change Your Husband ... were designed by Wilfred Buckland, art director, whose hand is responsible for so much that is highly artistic in Artcraft and Paramount films."

Buckland described his process to a newspaper reporter in 1920. Buckland said he would review the script to get an idea of what the characters were like and what their surroundings should be. He would prepare sketches of the required sets and turn the sketches over to a force of architectural draftsmen in the next room. After a structure was built, Buckland would also direct the interior painting and decorations. He noted at the time that he hoped to see film sets move away from the building of real or photographic interiors and deal more with atmosphere. He added:

"In painting a picture an artist does not paint a real house, reproducing every minute detail. That sort of thing belongs to the old and now despised photographic school of art. He paints in something to give tone to the figures. The great secret of art, as Whistler said, is knowing what to leave out. Every once in awhile [sic?] you get a shock by discovering a picture in which the director has shown signs of an artistic conscience. But the majority of moving pictures are still far behind commercial photography, which is becoming less and less photographic while most of the advertisements in the back pages of our magazines are more artistic than the average movie."

In 1917, Buckland wrote to Cecil B. DeMille expressing his dissatisfaction over having his artistic vision stifled. He said, "I came to Hollywood ... in search of a chance to visualize a more 'pictorial' way, by adapting to film the same rules that govern the higher art of painting." Buckland also complained in the press that the art director's job, like that of the actor, suffered from over-production. Buckland noted that he had supervised 56 pictures in a single year and added, "Studio necessities compel him to supervise the art work on a number of productions at one time. As a consequence, the art director becomes an architect, or perhaps merely a scenic artist, instead of the illustrator of the dramatic story."

Buckland's collaboration with DeMille remained contentious, and the two broke off their working relationship in 1920.

Despite the falling out, DeMille spoke at a 1941 testimonial dinner for Buckland and called him a "great artist and a great man" and said he had been glad "to sit at your feet."

== Alan Dwan and Robin Hood ==
In 1920, Buckland left DeMille and began to work with director Alan Dwan. After the release of the feature Omar the Tentmaker (1922), one reviewer wrote: "Settings for this master film were personally designed and executed under the direction of Wilfred Buckland, the first man in his field in the films and still recognized as its finest craftsman."

While working with Dwan, Buckland created the castle for Douglas Fairbanks' Robin Hood (also 1922). The castle was one of the largest sets built at the time. When the film was released, the Los Angeles Times reported:

"Castle a Marvel. Greatest of all the settings is, of course, the castle which for months has been a sort of landmark of cinema enterprise on Santa Monica Boulevard. The vastness of this feudal domain is the most astonishing of the picture's startling features. One looks through waves upon waves of light and shadow to the stone walls which mark the background. Fairytale heights of tower and turret are suggested. ... Yet there is never anything of grotesquerie in this, only and always a legendary magnificence such as is suggested by the Maxfield Parrish paintings of the Moyen Age. Artistry is at its height in these Medieval scenes."

Film historian Juan Antonio Ramírez later called Buckland's Robin Hood castle, with its immense size and eight circular turrets, perhaps the most impressive of all the Hollywood castles ever built.

Buckland was credited with developing the art of miniature stage building, as reflected in a 1924 Daily Democrat-Tribune newspaper account: "The art of miniature stage building has been introduced into the production of motion pictures as another means toward economy and efficency [sic], and of insuring fidelity and realism. This system has been perfected by Wilfred Buckland, a famous art director."

== Later years and death ==
Dwan signed with Famous Players–Lasky after the release of Robin Hood, and Buckland's career after 1923 declined. He worked mostly as a production illustrator after 1923.

Buckland was married to actress Veda (McEvers) Buckland (August 26, 1883 – May 20, 1941). After her death their son, Wilfred Buckland, Jr., suffered a mental breakdown and was hospitalized at the Camarillo State Mental Hospital.

In 1946, Buckland was part of a murder-suicide at his home located at 2035 Pinehurst Avenue in the Hollywood Heights neighborhood of Los Angeles. He shot and killed his 36-year-old son and then shot himself. Buckland left a note that said, "I am taking Billy with me." The Los Angeles Times reported on the tragedy as follows:

"Hollywood's first art director, 80-year-old Wilfred Buckland Sr., yesterday killed his mentally ailing son, 36, and then fatally shot himself in a double tragedy inspired by his fear of impending death from old age and reluctance to leave the younger man alone in the world. Termed the 'founder of Hollywood cinema art,' the elder Buckland fired a bullet into the back of his sleeping son's head, which brought instant death."

He was interred at Grand View Memorial Park Cemetery in Glendale, California.

== Buckland's place in film history ==
In 1924, the magazine Story World selected a list of the ten individuals who had contributed the most to the advancement of the motion picture industry from the time of its inception. The list omitted DeMille, but included Buckland, who was credited "for his work in developing and perfecting technical art in films." Others on the list included D.W. Griffith, Charlie Chaplin, Mary Pickford, Carl Laemmle and C. Gardner Sullivan.

In his book The Art Direction Handbook for Film, Michael Rizzo wrote:

"The practical vision of Buckland, the little known Hollywood art director and initiator of the use of controlled lighting within studio environments, set a standard in the first decades of the twentieth century that has become as commonplace as shooting film sequences in Hollywood soundstages today. He stands as an art-directing giant; his creative ingenuity ennobles the craft of film design even now."

In 1980, the Victoria and Albert Museum in London held an exhibition called "The Art of Hollywood," focusing on the role of art directors in the development of cinema. The United Press International (UPI) described the exhibition's focus on the work of Buckland: "More than that, an argument could be made — and this show makes it — that everything we know as 'Hollywood' traces to Wilfred Buckland, Hollywood's first art director."

Buckland was one of the first individuals inducted into the Art Directors Guild Hall of Fame when it was established in 2005.

== Filmography ==
- The Squaw Man (1914)
- The Ghost Breaker (1914)
- Brewster's Millions (1914)
- The Man on the Box (1914)
- The Virginian
- The Call of the North (1914)
- What's His Name
- The Man from Home
- The Unafraid (1915)
- The Captive (1915)
- The Warrens of Virginia (1915)
- Carmen (1915)
- The Cheat (1915)
- The Wild Goose Chase (1915)
- The Arab (1915)
- Chimmie Fadden (1915)
- Kindling (1915)
- Chimmie Fadden Out West (1915)
- Temptation (1915)
- The Golden Chance (1915)
- Maria Rosa (1916)
- The Trail of the Lonesome Pine (1916)
- The Heart of Nora Flynn (1916)
- The Dream Girl (1916)
- Joan the Woman (1917)
- A Romance of the Redwoods (1917)
- The Little American (1917)
- The Woman God Forgot (1917)
- The Devil-Stone (1917)
- The Little Princess (1917)
- Stella Maris (1918)
- The Whispering Chorus (1918)
- Old Wives for New (1918)
- We Can't Have Everything (1918)
- Till I Come Back to You (1918)
- The Squaw Man (1918)
- M'Liss (1918)
- The Grim Game (1919)
- Don't Change Your Husband (1919)
- You're Fired (1919)
- For Better, for Worse (1919)
- Male and Female (1919)
- A Perfect Crime (1921)
- The Deuce of Spades (1922)
- The Masquerader (1922)
- Omar the Tentmaker (1922)
- Robin Hood (1922)
- Adam's Rib (1923)
- The Fast Set (1924)
- Icebound (1924)
- The Forbidden Woman (1927)
- Almost Human (1927)

== See also ==
- Art Directors Guild Hall of Fame
