= The Dupe =

1916 film by Frank Reicher

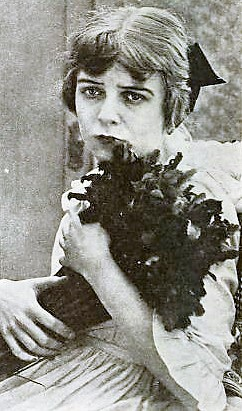
- Blanche Sweet in The Dupe
- Directed by: Frank Reicher
- Screenplay by: Hector Turnbull; Margaret Turnbull
- Produced by: Jesse L. Lasky
- Starring: Blanche Sweet; Ernest Joy; Veda McEvers; Thomas Meighan
- Cinematography: Dent Gilbert
- Production company: Jesse L. Lasky Feature Play Company
- Distributed by: Paramount Pictures
- Release date: July 2, 1916
- Running time: 50 minutes
- Country: United States
- Language: English

The Dupe is a 1916 American drama silent film directed by Frank Reicher and written by Hector Turnbull and Margaret Turnbull. The film stars Blanche Sweet, Ernest Joy, Veda McEvers and Thomas Meighan. The film was released on July 2, 1916, by Paramount Pictures.

== Cast ==
- Blanche Sweet as Ethel Hale
- Ernest Joy as Mr. Strong
- Veda McEvers as Mrs. Strong
- Thomas Meighan as Jimmy Regan
