= The Circus Man =

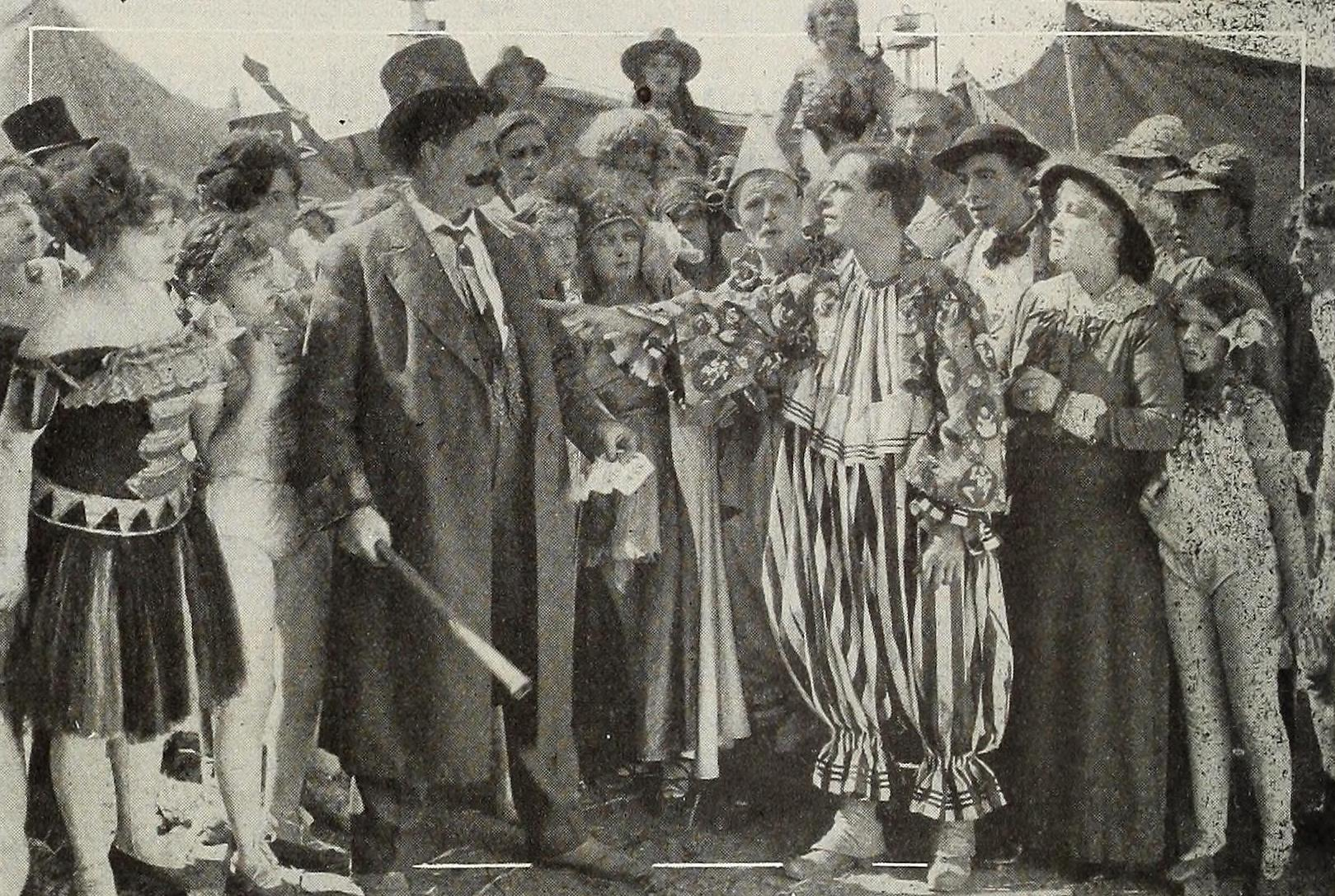
- Scene from the film
- Directed by: Oscar Apfel
- Written by: Cecil B. DeMille
- Based on: The Rose in the Ring by George Barr McCutcheon
- Produced by: Jesse L. Lasky
- Starring: Theodore Roberts
- Distributed by: Paramount Pictures
- Release date: November 19, 1914
- Running time: 5 reels
- Country: United States
- Language: Silent (English intertitles)

The Circus Man is a 1914 American silent drama film produced by Jesse L. Lasky and distributed by Paramount Pictures. It was directed by Oscar Apfel and written by Cecil B. DeMille from a story based on the novel The Rose in the Ring by George Barr McCutcheon. It is preserved at the Library of Congress.

== Cast ==
- Theodore Roberts - Thomas Braddock
- Mabel Van Buren - Mary Braddock
- Florence Dagmar - Christine Braddock
- Hubert Whitehead - Frank Jenison
- Jode Mullally - David Jenison
- Raymond Hatton - Ernie Cronk
- Frank Hickman - Dick Cronk
- Fred Montague - Colonel Grand
- William Elmer - Isaac Perry (*as Billy Elmer)
- James Neill - Richard Jenison
