= The Race (1916 film) =

1916 film by George Melford

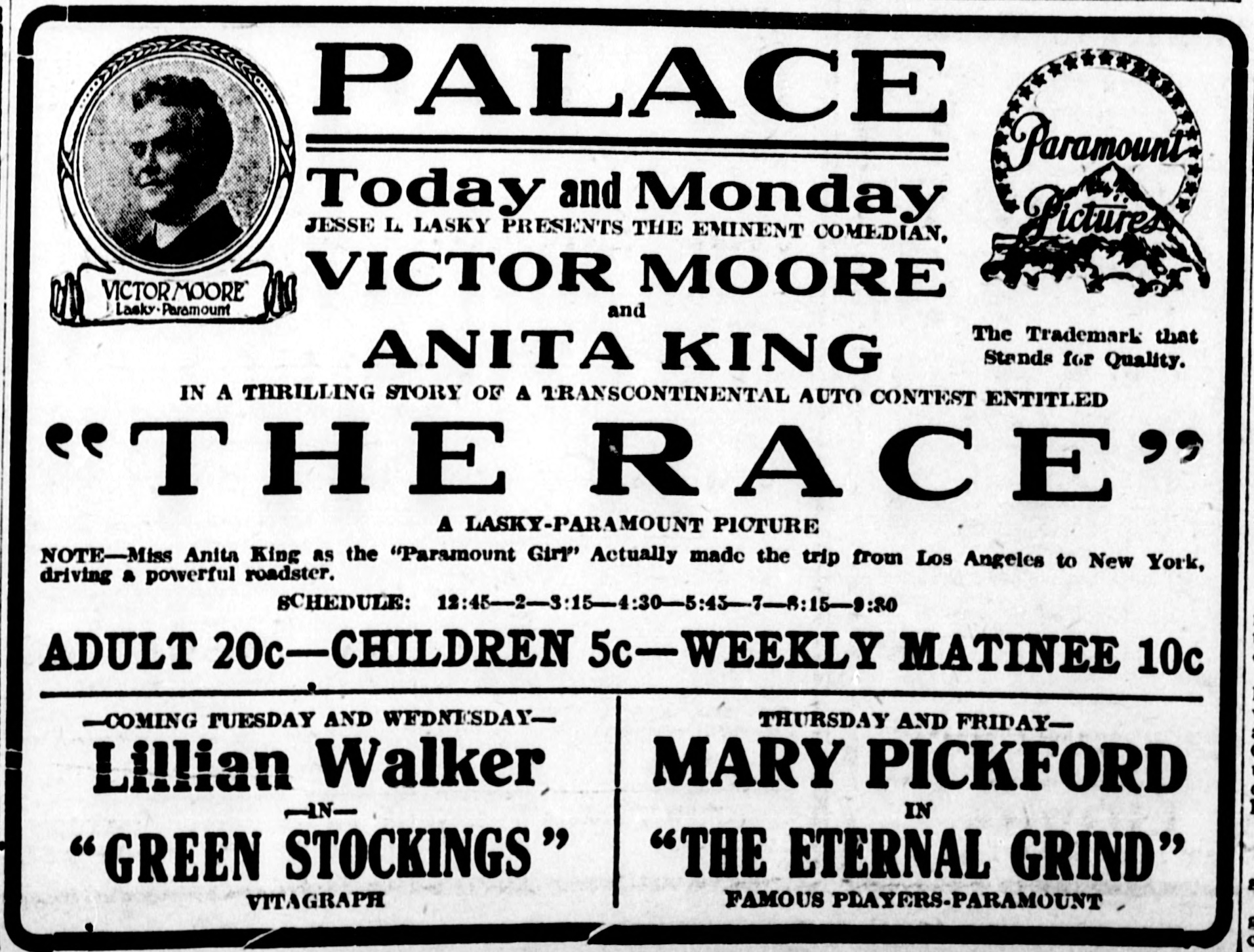
- Newspaper advertisement
- Directed by: George Melford
- Screenplay by: Hector Turnbull; Clinton Stagg
- Produced by: Jesse L. Lasky
- Starring: Victor Moore; Anita King; Ronald Bradbury; William Dale; Mrs. Lewis McCord; Ernest Joy
- Cinematography: Percy Hilburn (French)
- Production company: Jesse L. Lasky Feature Play Company
- Distributed by: Paramount Pictures
- Release date: April 6, 1916
- Running time: 50 minutes
- Country: United States
- Language: English

The Race is a 1916 American drama silent film directed by George Melford and written by Hector Turnbull and Clinton Stagg. The film stars Victor Moore, Anita King, Ronald Bradbury, William Dale, Mrs. Lewis McCord and Ernest Joy. The film was released on April 6, 1916, by Paramount Pictures. The film is lost.

== Plot ==
Although the film was advertised as being based on Anita King's real cross country trip in a roadster, the film actually follows the adventures of a man trying to win money in a transcontinental car race to pay back debt he owes. He eventually realizes that Grace needs money for her father and intentionally lets her win. The man gets money from an engine patent in the end anyway and that covers what he owes.

== Cast ==
- Victor Moore as Jimmy Grayson Jr.
- Anita King as Grace Van Dyke
- Ronald Bradbury as James Grayson Sr.
- William Dale as Andrew Van Dyke
- Mrs. Lewis McCord as Mrs. Jefferson
- Ernest Joy as Mr. Anderson
- Horace B. Carpenter as A Mechanic
