= 1915 in film =

The year 1915 in film involved some significant events.

== Events ==
- February 1: Fox Film Corporation founded
- February 8: D. W. Griffith's The Birth of a Nation premieres at Clune's Auditorium Los Angeles and breaks both box office and film length records (running at a total length of over three hours).
- February: Metro Pictures, a forerunner of Metro-Goldwyn-Mayer, is founded
- February 22: The Allan Dwan directed film David Harum is released. The film is the first in long line of a successful romantic onscreen pairings of actors May Allison and Harold Lockwood.
- March 15: Universal Studios Hollywood opens (1964).
- April 11: Charlie Chaplin's film The Tramp is released in the United States.
- June 18: The Motion Picture Directors Association (MPDA) is formed by twenty-six film directors in Los Angeles, California.
- July: Triangle Film Corporation is founded in Culver City, California and attracts filmmakers D. W. Griffith, Thomas H. Ince and Mack Sennett
- September 11: A nitrate fire at Famous Players in New York destroys several completed but unreleased silent films which are later remade. Films lost include Mary Pickford's Esmerelda and The Foundling and John Barrymore's The Red Widow.
- October 1: A US court rules in United States v. Motion Picture Patents Co. that the Motion Picture Patents Company trust is monopolistic and orders it to be dissolved.
- November 18: Release of Inspiration, the first mainstream movie in which a leading actress (Audrey Munson) appears nude.
- December 13: Sessue Hayakawa becomes the first Asian actor to become a star in the US after his performance in The Cheat.
- The Duplex Corporation creates a Split Duplex, an early widescreen film format where the film image is rotated 90 degrees and occupies half of a conventional frame.
- Max Fleischer invents the rotoscoping animation process in the US.
- The Kinematograph Renters’ Society of Great Britain and Ireland is formed to represent film distribution companies

== Top-grossing films (U.S.) ==
The top ten 1915 released films by box office gross in North America are as follows:

Highest-grossing films of 1915
| Rank | Title | Studio | Gross |
|---|---|---|---|
| 1 | The Birth of a Nation | Epoch | $5,200,000 |
| 2 | Carmen | Paramount | $147,600 |
| 3 | The Cheat | Paramount | $137,364 |
| 4 | Temptation | Paramount | $102,437 |
| 5 | The Girl of the Golden West | Paramount | $102,224 |
| 6 | The Warrens of Virginia | Paramount | $85,770 |
| 7 | The Golden Chance | Paramount | $83,504 |
| 8 | Chimmie Fadden | Paramount | $78,944 |
| 9 | Chimmie Fadden Out West | Paramount | $72,036 |
| 10 | The Arab | Paramount | $68,526 |

== Notable films ==
Films produced in the United States unless stated otherwise

=== A ===
- Alias Jimmy Valentine, directed by Maurice Tourneur, starring Robert Warwick
- Assunta Spina, directed by Gustavo Serena, starring Francesca Bertini – (Italy)

=== B ===
- The Bank, directed by and starring Charlie Chaplin, with Edna Purviance
- The Birth of a Nation, directed by D. W. Griffith, starring Lillian Gish and Henry B. Walthall
- Blackbirds, directed by J. P. McGowan, starring Laura Hope Crews and Thomas Meighan
- A Burlesque on Carmen, directed by and starring Charlie Chaplin, with Edna Purviance
- By the Sea, directed by and starring Charlie Chaplin

=== C ===
- The Captive, directed by Cecil B. DeMille, starring Blanche Sweet
- Carmen, directed by Cecil B. DeMille, starring Geraldine Farrar, based on the 1845 novella by Prosper Mérimée
- The Champion, directed by and starring Charlie Chaplin, with Edna Purviance
- The Cheat, directed by Cecil B. DeMille, starring Fannie Ward and Sessue Hayakawa
- The Coward, directed by Reginald Barker, starring Frank Keenan and Charles Ray

=== D ===
- The Dawn of a Tomorrow, directed by James Kirkwood, starring Mary Pickford
- The Devil's Daughter (lost), directed by Frank Powell, starring Theda Bara
- Double Trouble, directed by Christy Cabanne, starring Douglas Fairbanks

=== E ===
- Enoch Arden, directed by Christy Cabanne, starring Lillian Gish and D. W. Griffith

=== F ===
- Fanchon the Cricket, directed by James Kirkwood, starring Mary Pickford
- Fatty's Tintype Tangle, directed by and starring Fatty Arbuckle
- Filibus, directed by Mario Roncoroni – (Italy)
- A Fool There Was, directed by Frank Powell, starring Theda Bara

=== G ===
- A Gentleman of Leisure, directed by George Melford, starring Wallace Eddinger
- A Girl of Yesterday (lost), directed by Allan Dwan, starring Mary Pickford
- The Golem (Der Golem) (incomplete), directed by Paul Wegener and Henrik Galeen – (Germany)

=== H ===
- His New Job, directed by and starring Charlie Chaplin
- Hypocrites, directed by Lois Weber

=== I ===
- In the Park, directed by and starring Charlie Chaplin, with Edna Purviance
- The Incorrigible Dukane, directed by James Durkin, starring John Barrymore
- Inspiration (lost), directed by George Foster Platt, starring Audrey Munson
- The Italian, directed by Reginald Barker, starring George Beban

=== J ===
- A Jitney Elopement, directed by and starring Charlie Chaplin, with Edna Purviance

=== L ===
- The Lamb, directed by Christy Cabanne, starring Douglas Fairbanks
- Little Pal, directed by James Kirkwood, starring Mary Pickford

=== M ===
- Madame Butterfly, directed by Sidney Olcott, starring Mary Pickford
- Martyrs of the Alamo, directed by Christy Cabanne
- Mistress Nell, directed by James Kirkwood, starring Mary Pickford and Owen Moore

=== N ===
- A Night in the Show, directed by and starring Charlie Chaplin, with Edna Purviance
- A Night Out, directed by and starring Charlie Chaplin

=== P ===
- The Picture of Dorian Gray, directed by Eugene Moore, based on the 1890 novel by Oscar Wilde
- Pool Sharks, directed by Edwin Middleton, starring W. C. Fields

=== R ===
- Rapsodia Satanica (Satanic Rhapsody), directed by Nino Oxilia – (Italy)
- The Raven, directed by Charles Brabin, starring Henry B. Walthall
- Regeneration, directed by Raoul Walsh, starring Rockliffe Fellowes and Anna Q. Nilsson

=== S ===
- Shanghaied, directed by and starring Charlie Chaplin, with Edna Purviance

=== T ===
- The Tramp, directed by and starring Charlie Chaplin, with Edna Purviance
- Trilby, directed by Maurice Tourneur, starring Clara Kimball Young, based on the 1894 novel by George du Maurier

=== W ===
- The Wheels of Justice, directed by Theodore Marston
- A Woman, directed by and starring Charlie Chaplin, with Edna Purviance
- Work, directed by and starring Charlie Chaplin, with Edna Purviance

== Short film series ==
- Broncho Billy Anderson (1910–1916)
- Harold Lloyd (1913–1921)
- Charlie Chaplin (1914–1923)

== Births ==
- January 1 – Maxine Doyle, actress (died 1973)
- January 9
  - Anita Louise, actress (died 1970)
  - Fernando Lamas, actor (died 1982)
- January 11 – Veda Ann Borg, actress (died 1973)
- January 18 – Catherine Craig, actress (died 2004)
- January 26 – William Hopper, actor; son of Hedda Hopper (died 1970)
- January 29 – Bill Peet, Disney author and illustrator (died 2002)
- January 30 – Dorothy Dell, actress (died 1934)
- February 6 – Danuta Szaflarska, Polish actress (died 2017)
- February 7 – Eddie Bracken, American actor (died 2002)
- February 12 – Lorne Greene, Canadian actor (died 1987)
- February 18 – Phyllis Calvert, English actress (died 2002)
- February 20 – Philip Friend, English actor (died 1987)
- February 21 – Ann Sheridan, American actress (died 1967)
- February 23 – Jon Hall, actor (died 1979)
- February 28 – Zero Mostel, American actor (died 1977)
- March 2 – Lona Andre, actress (died 1992)
- March 17 – Henry Bumstead, art director (died 2006)
- March 19 – Patricia Morison, actress (died 2018)
- April 10 – Harry Morgan, American actor (died 2011)
- April 21 – Anthony Quinn, actor (died 2001)
- May 5
  - Alice Faye, actress, (died 1998)
  - Ben Wright (English actor), (died 1989)
- May 6 – Orson Welles, actor, director (died 1985)
- May 8 – John Archer, American actor (died 1999)
- May 15 – Bill Williams, actor, (died 1992)
- May 19 – Renée Asherson, actress, (died 2014)
- May 31 – Barbara Pepper, actress, (died 1969)
- June 1 - John Randolph (actor), American actor (died 2004)
- June 12 – Priscilla Lane, singer, actress (died 1995)
- June 16 - Anthony Sharp, English actor (died 1984)
- June 20 - Terence Young (director), Irish director and screenwriter (died 1994)
- July 18 – Phyllis Brooks, American actress, model (died 1995)
- August 2 – Gary Merrill, actor (died 1990)
- August 11 – Jean Parker, American actress (died 2005)
- August 15 – Signe Hasso, Swedish actress (died 2002)
- August 29 – Ingrid Bergman, Swedish-born actress (died 1982)
- September 5 – Jack Buetel, actor (died 1989)
- September 10 – Edmond O'Brien, actor (died 1985)
- September 14 – Douglas Kennedy, actor (died 1973)
- September 25 – Betty Box, English producer (died 1999)
- September 29
  - Brenda Marshall, American actress (died 1992)
  - Anne Nagel, American actress (died 1966)
- October 29 – Evi Rauer, Estonian actress (died 2004)
- October 31 - Lennard Pearce, British actor (died 1984)
- December 7 – Eli Wallach, American actor (died 2014)
- December 12 – Frank Sinatra, American singer, actor (died 1998)
- December 13 – Curd Jürgens, German actor (died 1982)
- December 14 – Dan Dailey, American actor (died 1978)
- December 17 – Joan Woodbury, American actress (died 1989)
- December 22 – Barbara Billingsley, American actress (died 2010)
- December 29 – Jo Van Fleet, American actress (died 1996)

== Deaths ==
- January 10 – Marshall Pinckney Wilder, 55, American diminutive stage and screen actor
- April 26 – John Bunny, 51, American silent film comedian, A Strand of Blond Hair, Bunny's Little Brother, Bunny Backslides
- June 5 – John C. Rice, 58, stage and film actor, The Kiss
- June 16 – Elmer Booth, 32, American silent screen actor, brother of film editor Margaret Booth, The Musketeers of Pig Alley, The Narrow Road, An Unseen Enemy
- October 31 – Blanche Walsh, 42, American stage actress appeared in Zukor's 3 reel feature "Resurrection" 1912

== Film debuts ==
- Mary Boland – The Edge of the Abyss
- Laura Hope Crews – The Fighting Hope
- Reginald Denny – Niobe
- Elliott Dexter – Heléne of the North
- Douglas Fairbanks – The Lamb
- Pauline Frederick – The Eternal City
- John Gilbert – Aloha Oe
- Charlotte Greenwood – Jane
- Otto Kruger – A Mother's Confession
- Edmund Lowe – The Wild Olive
- Victor Moore – Snobs
- Esther Ralston – The Deep Purple
- Erich Von Stroheim – The Birth of a Nation
- Charlotte Walker – Kindling
- Fannie Ward – The Marriage of Kitty
