= List of Italian films of 1915 =

A list of films produced in Italy in 1915 (see 1915 in film):

Title	Director	Cast	Genre	Notes
1915
A San Francisco				
A Trieste - vincere o morire!				
L' Acrobata mascherato				
Addio mia bella adio... L'armata se ne va				
Assunta Spina	Gustavo Serena	Francesca Bertini, Gustavo Serena, Carlo Benetti, Luciano Albertini, Amelia Cipriani, Antonio Cruichi, Alberto Collo	Drama	Remade in 1949 starring Anna Magnani
La conquista dei diamanti	Augusto Genina			
Filibus	Mario Roncoroni	Cristina Ruspoli, Giovanni Spano, Mario Mariani, Filippo Vallino	Adventure	
Maciste	Luigi Romano Borgnetto, Vincenzo Denizot			
Rapsodia Satanica	Nino Oxilia	Lyda Borelli		
Senza colpa!	Carmine Gallone			
Sotto le tombe	Carmine Gallone			
Titanic	Pier Angelo Mazzolotti	Mario Bonnard, Giovanni Casaleggio		
