= The Squaw Man's Son =

1917 film

- Directed by: Edward LeSaint
- Screenplay by: Charles Maigne; Edwin Milton Royle
- Produced by: Jesse L. Lasky
- Starring: Wallace Reid; Anita King; Dorothy Davenport; Donald Bowles; Clarence Geldart; Frank Lanning
- Cinematography: Allen M. Davey
- Production company: Jesse L. Lasky Feature Play Company
- Distributed by: Paramount Pictures
- Release date: July 26, 1917
- Running time: 50 minutes
- Country: United States
- Languages: Silent; English intertitles

The Squaw Man's Son is a 1917 American silent Western film directed by Edward LeSaint, written by Charles Maigne and Edwin Milton Royle, and starring Wallace Reid, Anita King, Dorothy Davenport, Donald Bowles, Clarence Geldart and Frank Lanning. It was released on July 26, 1917, by Paramount Pictures.

== Cast ==
- Wallace Reid as Lord Effington
- Anita King as Wah-na-gi
- Dorothy Davenport as Edith, Lady Effington
- Donald Bowles as John McCloud
- Clarence Geldart as David Ladd
- Frank Lanning as Appah
- Ernest Joy as Lord Kerhill
- Lucien Littlefield as Lord Yester
- Mabel Van Buren as Lady Stuckley
- Raymond Hatton as Storekeeper
