= Anton the Terrible =

1916 film by William C. deMille

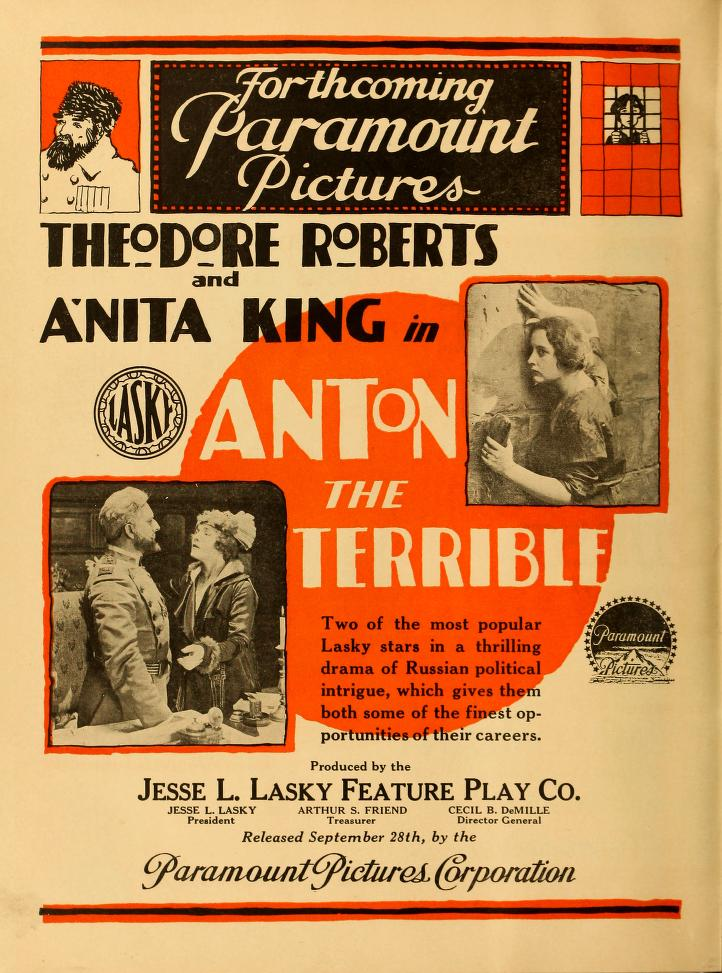
- contemporary advertisement
- Directed by: William C. deMille
- Screenplay by: Marion Fairfax; Jules Eckert Goodman; Charles Sarver
- Story by: Thomas H. Uzzell
- Produced by: Jesse L. Lasky
- Starring: Theodore Roberts; Anita King; Horace B. Carpenter; Harrison Ford; Edythe Chapman; Hugo B. Koch
- Cinematography: Charles Rosher
- Production company: Jesse L. Lasky Feature Play Company
- Distributed by: Paramount Pictures
- Release date: September 28, 1916
- Running time: 50 minutes
- Country: United States
- Language: English

Anton the Terrible is a 1916 American drama silent film directed by William C. deMille and written by Marion Fairfax, Jules Eckert Goodman and Charles Sarver. The film stars Theodore Roberts, Anita King, Horace B. Carpenter, Harrison Ford, Edythe Chapman and Hugo B. Koch. The film was released on September 28, 1916, by Paramount Pictures.

== Plot ==
Cossack Anton Kazoff seeks revenge for the wrongs inflicted on his sister Olga.

== Cast ==
- Theodore Roberts as Anton Kazoff
- Anita King as Vera Stanovitch
- Horace B. Carpenter as General Stanovitch
- Harrison Ford as David Burkin
- Edythe Chapman as Babushka
- Hugo B. Koch as Grand Duke Ivanovitch
- Delia Trombly as Olga Kazoff

== Surviving material ==
A fragmentary print (footage unknown) is preserved at the British Film Institute/National Film and Television Archive (London).

The Academy of Motion Picture Arts and Sciences archive has 8x10 photographic stills of the film.
