= George Clifford Shedd =

American novelist

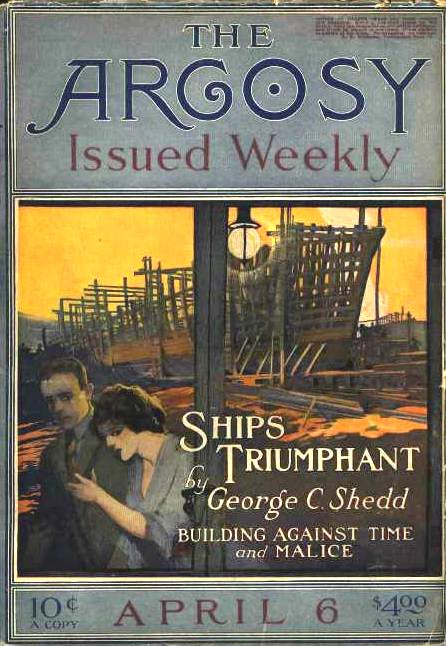
Shedd's novella "Ships Triumphant" was serialized in The Argosy in 1918

George Clifford Shedd (1877 – January 8, 1937) was an early 20th-century American writer. Several of his novels were adapted into films. His novel The Incorrigible Dukane (1911) was made into a film starring John Barrymore in 1915, and In the Shadow of the Hills (1919) was adapted for the screen as Cold Steel (1921).

Shedd was born in Ashland, Nebraska, the son of Hibbard H. Shedd, who served as Lieutenant Governor of Nebraska, and Katherine Lee Graves. He graduated from the University of Nebraska in 1900, and married Alice Nelson Shedd in 1921. He died of a heart attack at his home in Los Angeles.

== Bibliography ==
- The Princess of Forge (1910)
- The Incorrigible Dukane (1911)
- The Isle of Strife (1912)
- The Lady of Mystery House (1917)
- The Invisible Enemy (1918)
- In the Shadow of the Hills (1919)
- The Iron Furrow (1920)
- Cryder (1922)
- Miniatures (Essays)
- A Cry in the Wilderness (1922)
- The Canyon of Conflict: A Western Story
- The Harbor Master
