= We Can't Have Everything =

1918 film

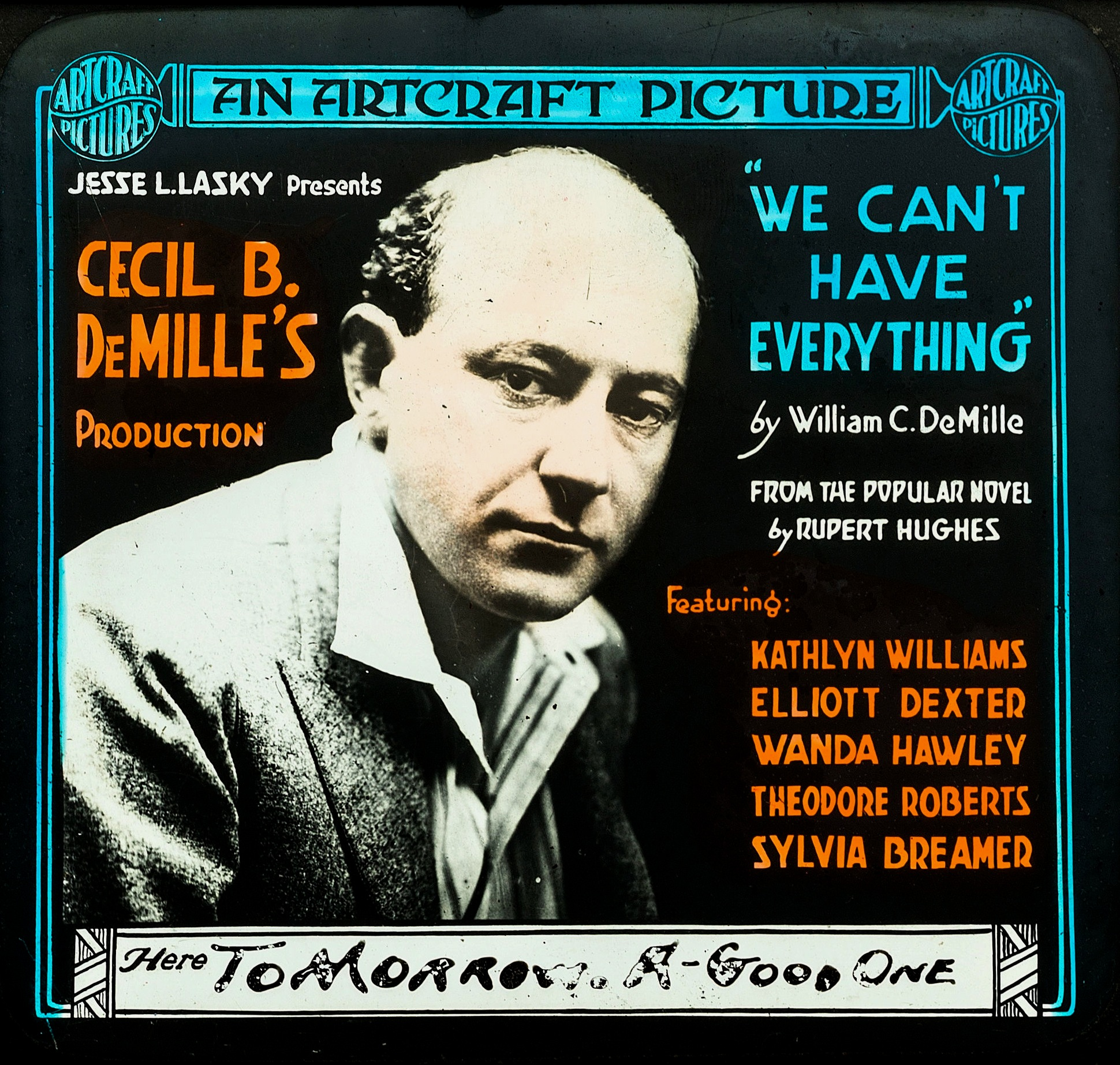
- Glass slide
- Directed by: Cecil B. DeMille; Sam Wood (asst. director)
- Written by: William C. de Mille
- Based on: We Can't Have Everything by Rupert Hughes
- Produced by: Cecil B. DeMille; Jesse L. Lasky
- Starring: Kathlyn Williams
- Cinematography: Alvin Wyckoff
- Edited by: Anne Bauchens; Cecil B. DeMille
- Production company: Famous Players–Lasky
- Distributed by: Paramount Pictures; Artcraft Pictures Famous Players-Lasky
- Release date: July 7, 1918
- Running time: 60 minutes
- Country: United States
- Language: Silent (English intertitles)

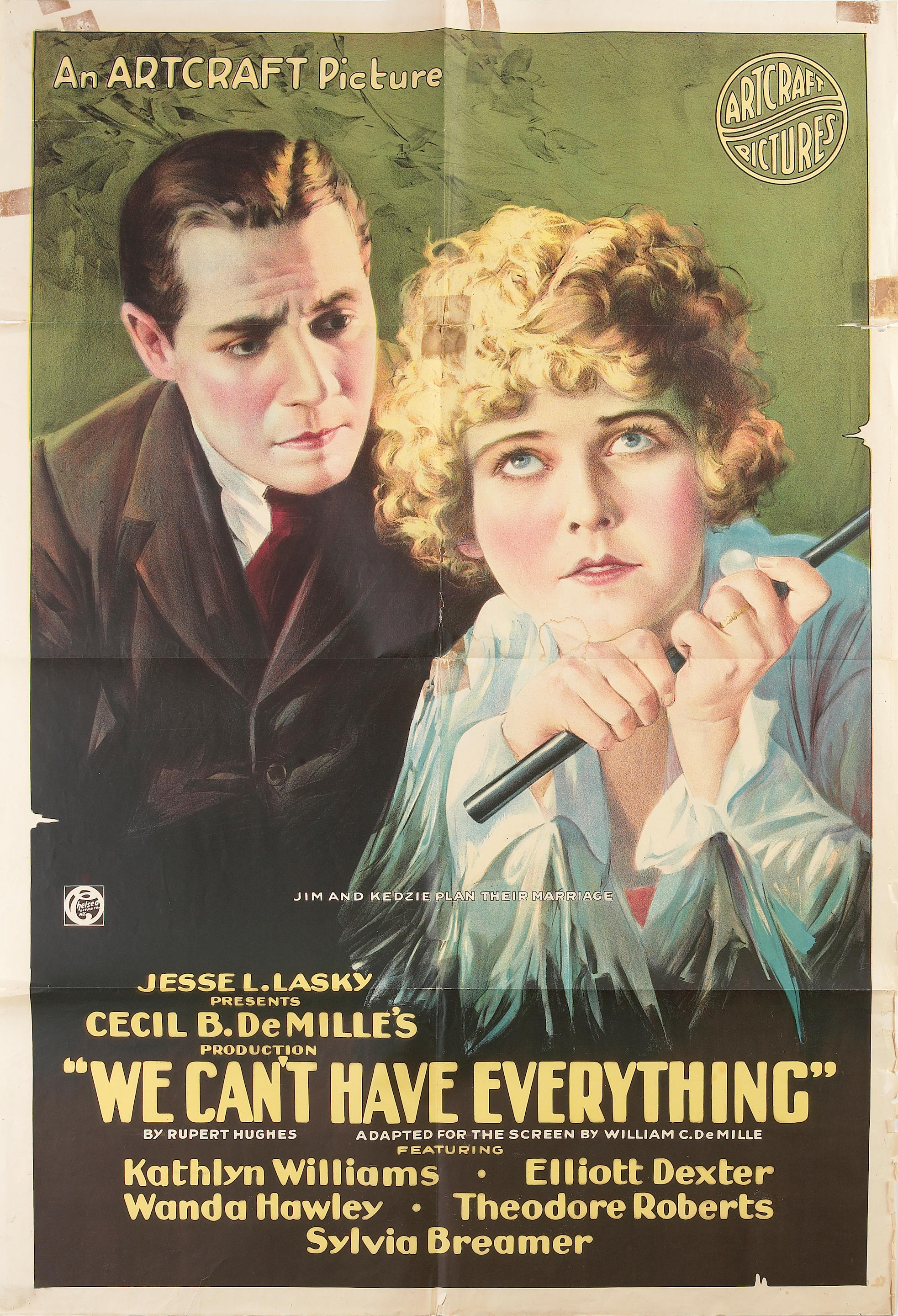

We Can't Have Everything was a 1918 American silent drama film produced and directed by Cecil B. DeMille and adapted for the screen by his brother, William C. De Mille. The film was based upon a 1917 novel of the same name by Rupert Hughes. Art direction for the film was done by Wilfred Buckland.

Lobby card

== Plot ==
As described in a film magazine, very much in love with her husband, Charity Coe Cheever discovers that her husband is in love with Zada L'Etoile, a popular dancer, and so she divorces him. Jim Dyckman, who has always loved Charity since their childhood days, after finding it impossible to win Charity had married film actress Kedzie Thropp. When Jim is free but Charity is not, Jim is very disappointed, but both decide to make the best of it. During one of Jim's absences Kedzie meets the young British airman, the Marquis Of Strathdene, and falls very much in love with him. Out for a ride one evening, Jim and Charity are forced during a storm to remain in a roadhouse. Here is Kedzie's chance, she sues for divorce and marries her English aviator. The start of the war puts Jim in the trenches in Europe and Charity in a convalescent hospital, they meet again and love finally wins.

== Cast ==
- Kathlyn Williams as Charity Coe Cheever
- Elliott Dexter as Jim Dyckman
- Wanda Hawley as Kedzie Thropp
- Sylvia Breamer as Zada L'Etoile
- Thurston Hall as Peter Cheever
- Raymond Hatton as Marquis Of Strathdene
- Tully Marshall as The Director
- Theodore Roberts as The Sultan
- James Neill as Detective
- Ernest Joy as Heavy
- William Elmer as Props
- Charles Ogle as Kedzie's Father
- Sylvia Ashton as Kedzie's Mother

== Preservation ==
With no prints of We Can't Have Everything located in any film archives, it is considered a lost film.
