= Snobs (film) =

1915 film by Oscar Apfel

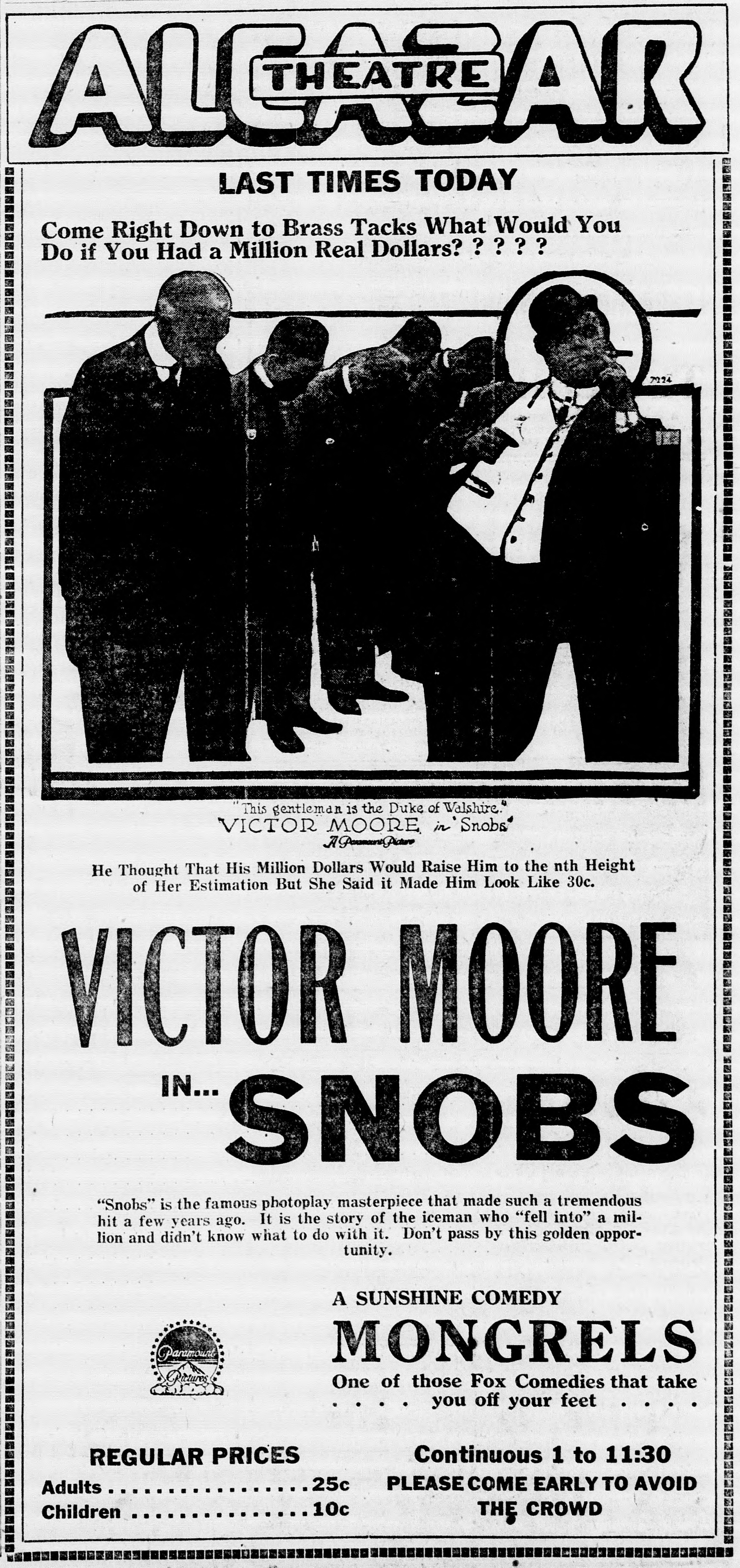
- Advertisement
- Directed by: Oscar Apfel
- Screenplay by: George Bronson Howard
- Produced by: Jesse L. Lasky
- Starring: Victor Moore; Anita King; Ernest Joy; Constance Johnson; Florence Dagmar
- Production company: Jesse L. Lasky Feature Play Company
- Distributed by: Paramount Pictures
- Release date: April 12, 1915
- Country: United States
- Language: English

Snobs is a surviving 1915 American comedy silent film directed by Oscar Apfel, written by George Bronson Howard, and starring Victor Moore, Anita King, Ernest Joy, Constance Johnson and Florence Dagmar. It was released on April 12, 1915, by Paramount Pictures. The film was Moore's feature film debut.

== Plot ==
How Henry, the milkman, is treated by the snobs after he inherits $20m.

== Cast ==
- Victor Moore as Henry Disney
- Anita King as Ethel Hamilton
- Ernest Joy as Mr. Phipps
- Constance Johnson as Laura Phipps
- Florence Dagmar
- Jode Mullally

== Preservation status ==
- Formerly thought lost, a copy is held in the Library of Congress collection Packard.
