= The Silent Partner (1917 film) =

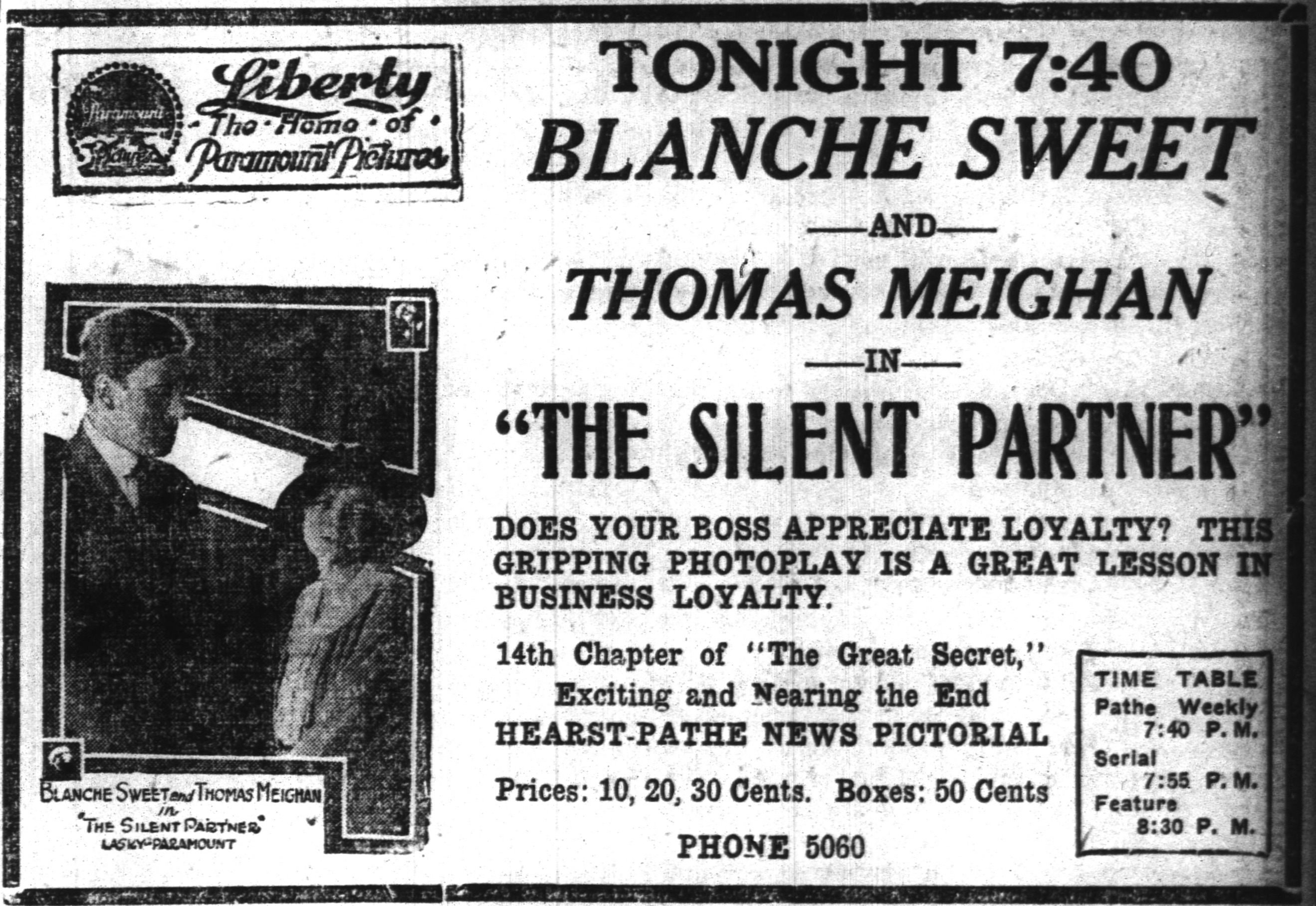
- Newspaper advertisement
- Directed by: Marshall Neilan
- Written by: George DuBois (scenario)
- Story by: Edmund Goulding
- Produced by: Jesse Lasky
- Cinematography: Walter Stradling
- Distributed by: Famous Players–Lasky; Paramount Pictures
- Release date: May 10, 1917
- Running time: 60 minutes
- Country: United States
- Languages: Silent; English intertitles

The Silent Partner is a 1917 American silent drama film directed by Marshall Neilan adapted from a story by Edmund Goulding and starring Blanche Sweet. The film was remade in 1923 and both versions were released by Paramount Pictures.

== Plot summary ==
Jane Colby is a stenographer working for the firm of Edward Royle and Harvey Wilson. She discovers a discrepancy in Wilson's accounts and Royle asks for his resignation. Socialite Edith Preston seduces Royle and marries him for his money despite being in love with Wilson, conspiring with the latter and another man to seize Royle's fortune. They nearly succeed, but Jane saves Royle by using buying his shares with her savings. Royle discovers Edith and Wilson's plot and tells Jane she is no longer a "silent partner" in his life.

== Cast ==
- Blanche Sweet as Jane Colby
- Thomas Meighan as Edward Royle
- Henry Herbert as Harvey Wilson
- Ernest Joy as David Pierce
- Mabel Van Buren as Edith Preston
- Florence Smythe as Mrs. Preston
- Mayme Kelso as Mrs. Wilson

== Censorship ==
Before The Silent Partner could be exhibited in Kansas, the Kansas Board of Review required the removal of a scene where a little boy is smoking a cigarette and all drinking scenes.

== See also ==
- Blanche Sweet filmography
