= The Woman (1915 film) =

1915 film by George Melford

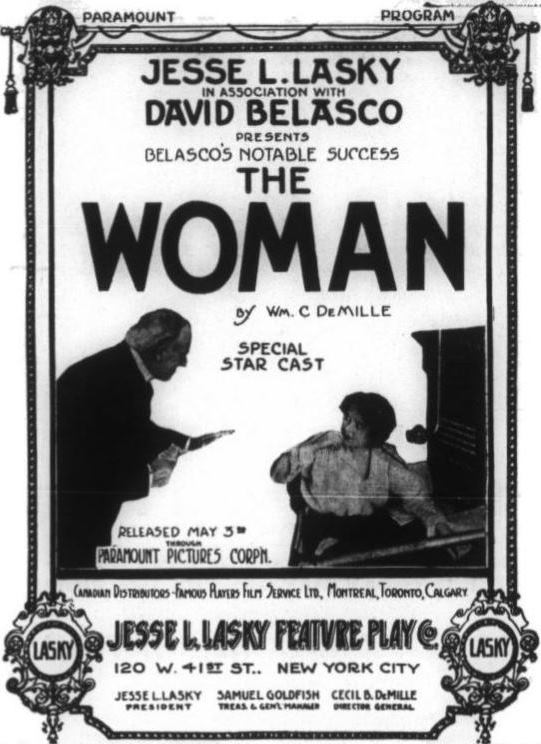
- Newspaper advertisement
- Directed by: George Melford
- Based on: by William C. deMille
- Produced by: David Belasco; Jesse L. Lasky
- Starring: Theodore Roberts; James Neill; Ernest Joy; Raymond Hatton; Mabel Van Buren; Tom Forman
- Production company: Jesse L. Lasky Feature Play Company
- Distributed by: Paramount Pictures
- Release date: May 3, 1915
- Running time: 50 minutes
- Country: United States
- Language: Silent (English intertitles)

The Woman is a 1915 American silent drama film directed by George Melford and starring Theodore Roberts, James Neill, Ernest Joy, Raymond Hatton, Mabel Van Buren, and Tom Forman. Based on a play by William C. deMille, the film was released on May 3, 1915, by Paramount Pictures.

== Plot ==
Senator Jim Blake and his son-in-law Mark Robertson hires an investigator to find dirt on Senator Matthew Standish, their political opponent. The investigator finds that, years earlier, Standish had spent a night in a hotel with a stranger whom the former senator's secretary, bribed by the detective, describes only as "a lady from a good family". Blake and Robertson try in every way to find out who the woman may be - and approach Wanda Kelly, a receptionist, to help them discover her name.

Wanda later learns that Grace, the mysterious woman, is Blake's daughter also Robertson's wife; she then destroys the evidence in her possession and refuses their bribe, even when threatened with arrest. Grace, realizing the troubles the girl could face because of him, confesses. Wanda, for her determination and honesty, arouses the admiration of Blake who does not pose any obstacles to the love story between her and her son.

== Cast ==
- Theodore Roberts as The Hononorable Jim Blake
- James Neill as The Honorable Mark Robertson
- Ernest Joy as The Hononorable Matthew Standish
- Raymond Hatton as Secretary
- Mabel Van Buren as Grace Robertson
- Tom Forman as Tom Blake
- Helen Hill as New England Maid
- Dr. Beitel as Detective
- Lois Meredith as Wanda Kelly

== Preservation status ==
Prints of The Woman survive in the Hungarian National Film Archive and the BFI National Film and Television Archive.
