= The Heir to the Hoorah =

1916 film by William C. deMille

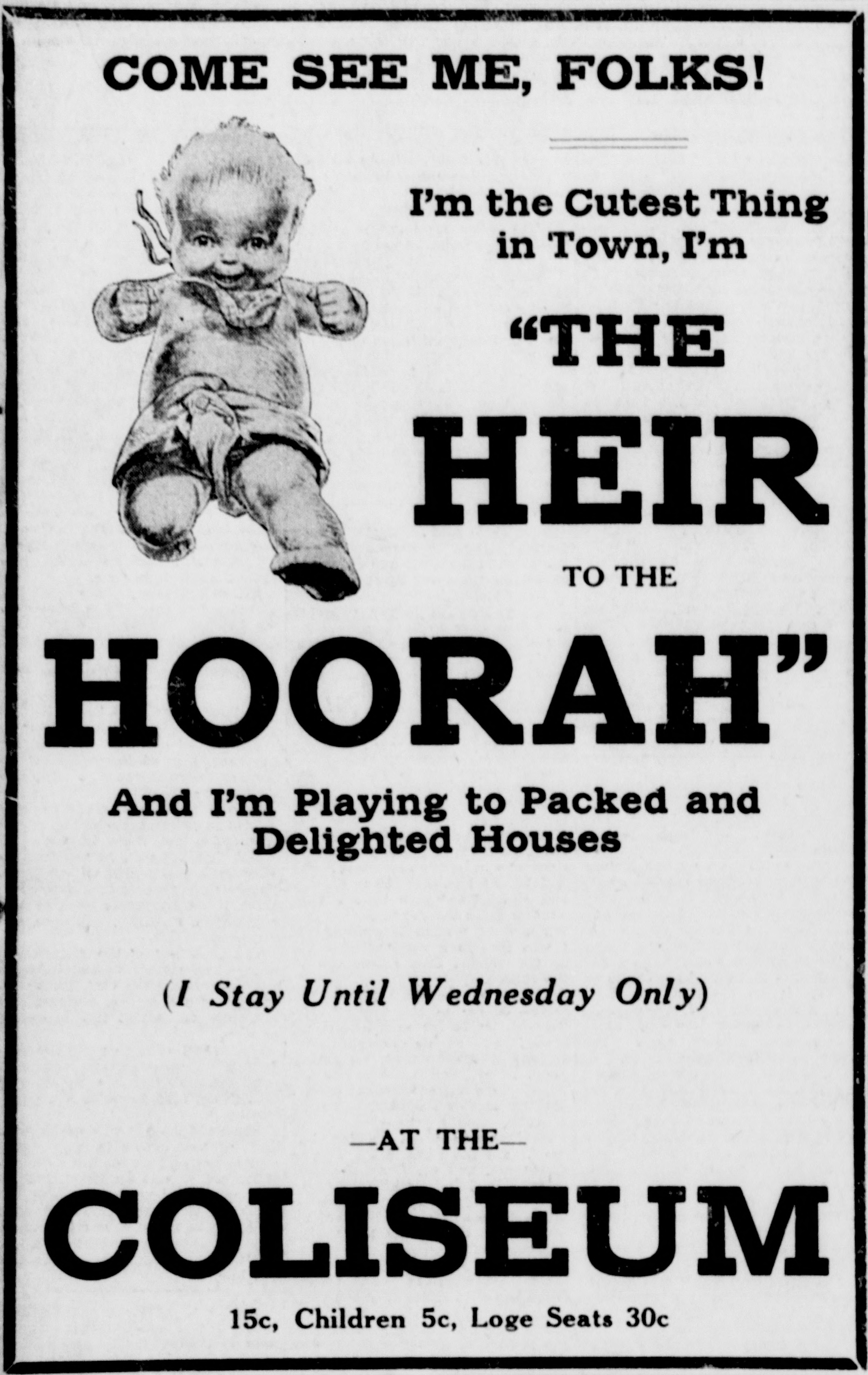
- Newspaper advertisement
- Directed by: William C. deMille
- Written by: Beatrice deMille; Leighton Osmun
- Based on: The Heir to the Hoorah by Paul Armstrong
- Produced by: Jesse L. Lasky
- Starring: Thomas Meighan; Anita King
- Cinematography: Charles Rosher
- Distributed by: Paramount Pictures
- Release date: October 26, 1916
- Running time: 5 reels
- Country: United States
- Languages: Silent; English intertitles

The Heir to the Hoorah is a surviving 1916 American silent drama film produced by Jesse L. Lasky and released through Paramount Pictures. It was directed by William C. deMille.

A print survives in the Library of Congress.

== Cast ==
- Thomas Meighan - Joe Lacy
- Anita King - Geraldine Kent
- Edythe Chapman - Mrs. Kent
- Horace B. Carpenter - Bud Young
- Charles Ogle - Bill Ferguson
- Ernest Joy - Mr. Marshall
- Joane Woodbury - Mrs. Marshall
