= The Blood of His Fathers =

1917 silent film

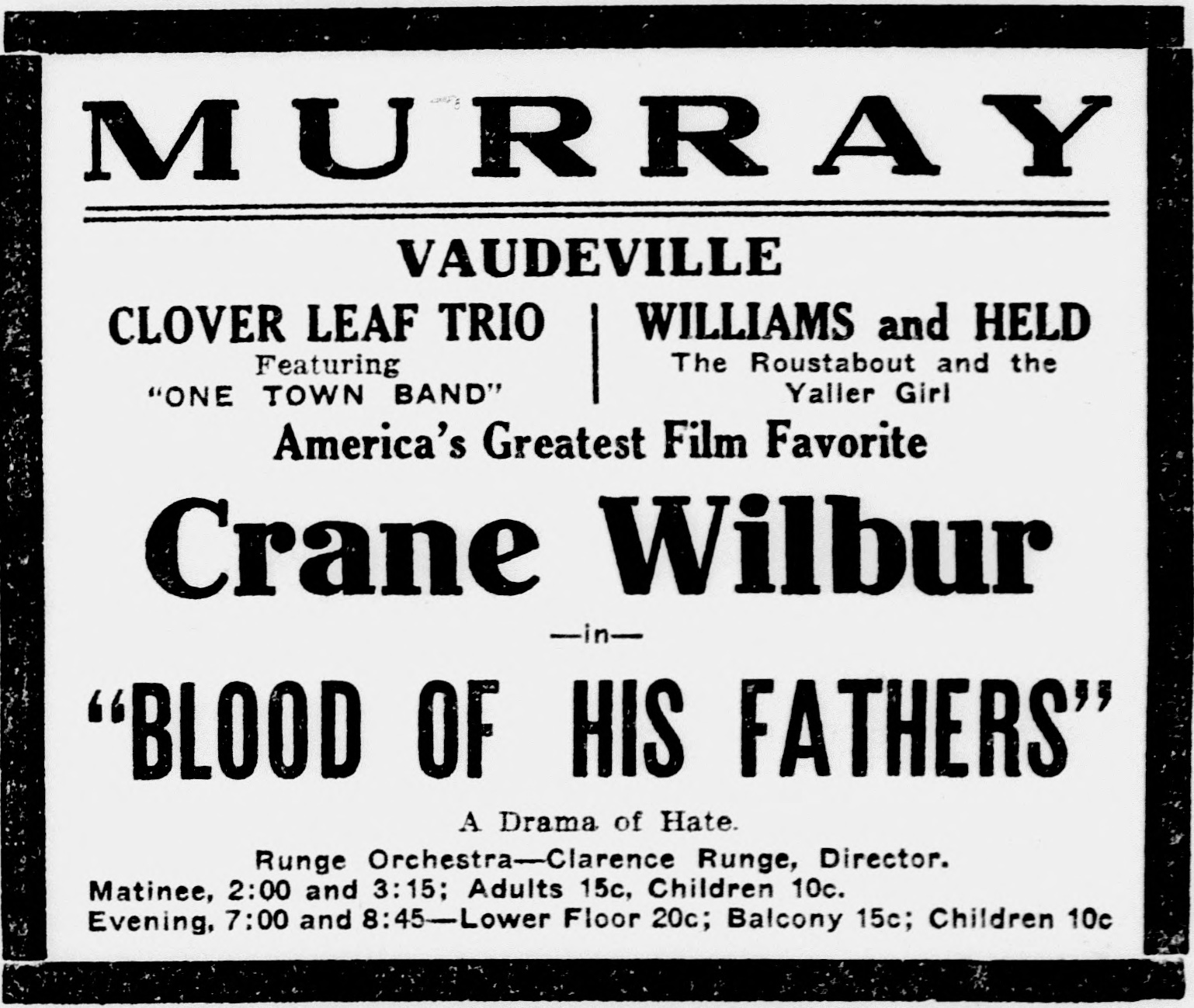
- Contemporary advertisement
- Directed by: Harrish Ingraham
- Written by: J. Francis Dunbar; Crane Wilbur
- Starring: Crane Wilbur; Jode Mullally; Ruth King
- Cinematography: Robert A. Turnbull
- Production company: David Horsley Productions
- Distributed by: Art Dramas
- Release date: September 10, 1917
- Running time: 50 minutes
- Country: United States
- Languages: Silent; English intertitles

The Blood of His Fathers is a 1917 American silent drama film directed by Harrish Ingraham and starring Crane Wilbur, Jode Mullally and Ruth King. The film begins shortly after the American Civil War when a renegade Confederate soldier commits three murders before jumping on to 1917.

== Cast ==
- Crane Wilbur as Morgan Gray / Abel Gray
- Jode Mullally as Kane Gray
- Gene Crosby as Hope Halliday
- Don Bailey as William Halliday
- Jacob Abrams as Isaac in 1917
- Joseph Hazelton as Anderson
- Doc Crane as John Graham
- Ruth King as Amity Graham
- Richie Carpenter as Isaac in 1865
- Ray Thomson as Lieutenant Wilfred Torrance
- Julia Jackson as Mrs. Graham

== See also ==
- List of films and television shows about the American Civil War

== Bibliography ==
- Connelly, Robert B. The Silents: Silent Feature Films, 1910-36, Volume 40, Issue 2. December Press, 1998.
