= The Winning of Sally Temple =

1917 film by George Melford

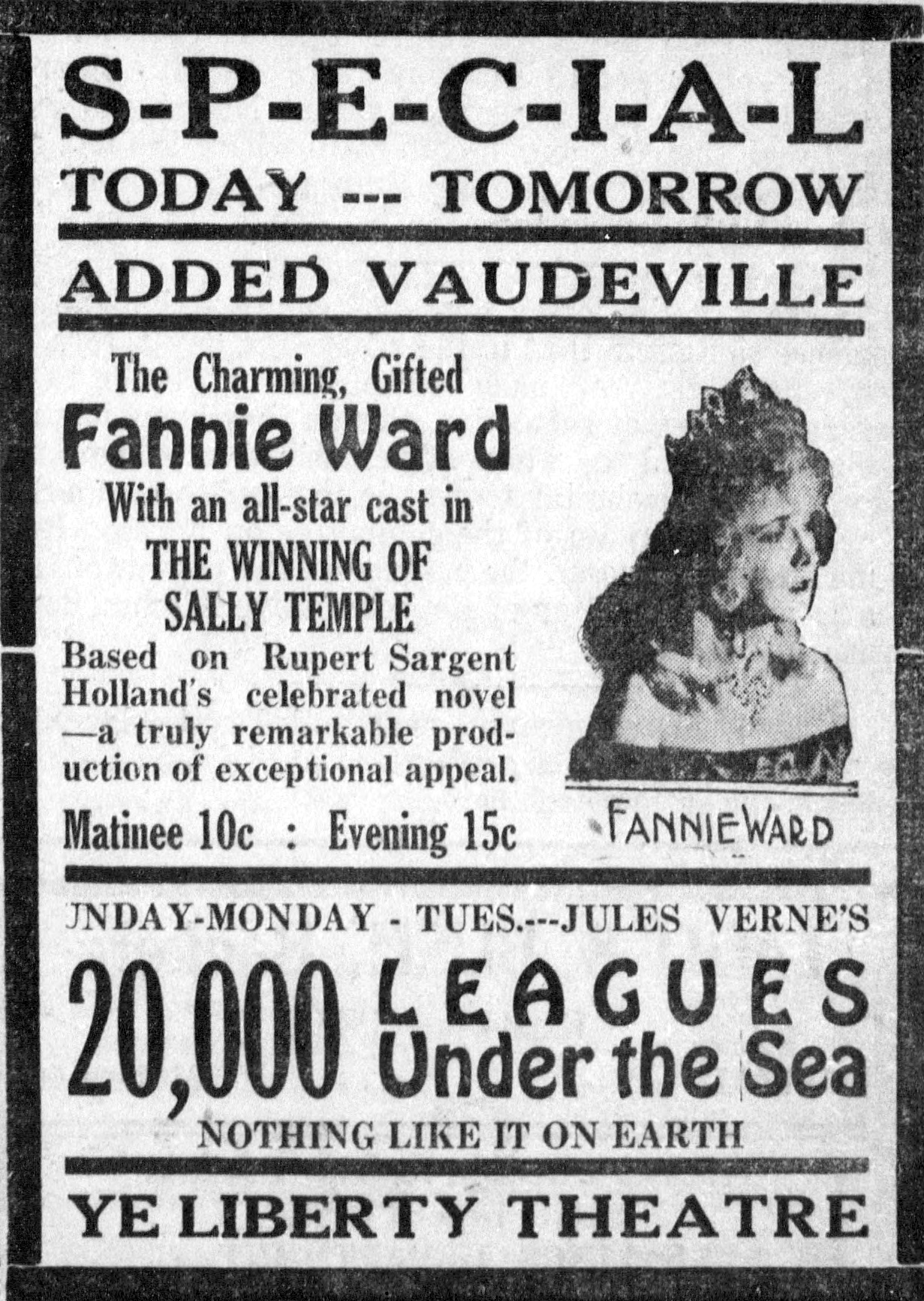
- Newspaper advertisement
- Directed by: George Melford
- Screenplay by: Rupert Sargent Holland; Harvey F. Thew
- Produced by: Jesse L. Lasky
- Starring: Fannie Ward; Jack Dean; Walter Long; Horace B. Carpenter; William Elmer; Paul Weigel
- Cinematography: Percy Hilburn (French)
- Production company: Jesse L. Lasky Feature Play Company
- Distributed by: Paramount Pictures
- Release date: February 19, 1917
- Running time: 50 minutes
- Country: United States
- Language: Silent (English intertitles)

The Winning of Sally Temple is a surviving 1917 American silent drama film directed by George Melford and written by Rupert Sargent Holland and Harvey F. Thew. The film stars Fannie Ward, Jack Dean, Walter Long, Horace B. Carpenter, William Elmer and Paul Weigel. The film was released on February 19, 1917, by Paramount Pictures.

== Plot ==
The story takes place in early 18th century England. Sally Temple is pursued by many men. She goes on a series of comedic misadventures, sometimes resulting in becoming somewhat undressed. Eventually she chooses a husband.

== Cast ==
- Fannie Ward as Sally Temple
- Jack Dean as Lord Romsey
- Walter Long as Duke of Chatto
- Horace B. Carpenter as Oliver Pipe
- William Elmer as Tom Jellitt
- Paul Weigel as Talbot
- Henry Woodward as Lord Verney
- Harry Jay Smith as Lord Dorset
- Eugene Pallette as Sir John Gorham
- Florence Smythe as Kate Temple
- John McKinnon as Gregory
- Vola Vale as Lady Pamela Vauclain

== Preservation ==
- A print is preserved and held in the Library of Congress collection.
