= Florence Smythe =

American actress (1878–1925)

Florence Smythe (April 19, 1878 – August 29, 1925) was a stage actress who was in silent motion pictures from 1915 to 1917.

== Career ==
In 1909, Smythe acted with the Belasco Stock Company. She was in six movies, The Wild Goose Chase (1915), The Fighting Hope (1915), The Voice in the Fog (1915), Common Ground (1916), The Winning of Sally Temple (1917), and The Silent Partner (1917). She left films and the stage prior to her marriage.

== Personal life ==
Smythe was born in Santa Barbara, California. In 1909, she was engaged to John Marshall, a state senator in South Carolina. She was married to silent film actor Theodore Roberts. The couple met while Florence was a member of the Theodore Roberts theatrical company. They lived in Los Angeles, California at 1915 North Vine Street.

=== Contentious divorce ===
Smythe was a party in a divorce battle that wound up in New York Supreme Court in February 1913. Theodore Roberts' first wife, Lucy Roberts, obtained a separation decree which provided $50 a week for alimony. She married the actor in Portland, Oregon in 1890. They separated in New York, New York on February 13, 1910. Roberts did not pay the alimony and was locked up in Ludlow Street jail.

The first Mrs. Roberts sued Smythe for $50,000, charging the actress with alienating the affections of the actor. A countersuit was filed by Miss Smythe asking a sum of $100,000. She contended the former Mrs. Roberts scandalized her by stating she furnished apartments for Theodore and advanced him money. The suit was not tried in court because the statute of limitations had run out.

== Death ==
On August 29, 1925, Smythe died from a heart ailment at her home at the age of 47.
