= Harrish Ingraham =

British film director, screenwriter, and actor (1881–?)

Harrish Ingraham (1881 – ?), was a British film director, screenwriter and actor during the era of silent movies.

== Life ==
Ingraham was born in London in 1881. He was educated at Bedford Modern School and the University of London. After the University of London he began his career as a school teacher.

Ingraham emigrated to the United States in 1902 in stock with Forepaugh Company in Cincinnati, Ohio. He later entered the Dominion stock company in Ottawa, Canada and was a lead with Adelaide Thurston. He had two years with Pathé and as leading man and director for the Whitman Feature Company. He joined David Horsley in June 1916 ("The Painted Lie", "Unlucky Jim", "The Morals of Men", "The Single Code", "The Eye of Envy", "Heirs of Hate").

== Filmography ==
=== Actor ===
- The Count's Will (1913)
- The Miner's Destiny, directed by Fred E. Wright (1913)
- The Mad Sculptor (1913)
- The Merrill Murder Mystery (1913)
- The Smuggler (1913)
- A Yellow Streak (1913)
- A Scandinavian Scandal (1913)
- The Patched Adonis (1914)
- Broken Lives (1914)
- Victims of Vanity (1914)
- A Leech of Industry, directed by Oscar Apfel (1914)
- The Million Dollar Robbery, directed by Herbert Blache (1914)
- The Toll of Love, directed by Martin Faust (1914)
- Jane Eyre, directed by Martin Faust (1914)
- Lena Rivers (1914)
- Jolts of Jealousy (1914)
- A Siren of the Jungle, directed by Charles Swickard (1916)
- For Her Good Name, directed by Robert Broadwell (1916)
- The Painted Lie, directed by Robert Broadwell, Harrish Ingraham and Crane Wilbur (1917)
- The Single Code, directed by Thomas Ricketts (1917)
- Unto the End, directed by Harrish Ingraham (1917)
- Blood of his fathers (1917)
- Child of M'sieu, directed by Harrish Ingraham (1919)
- A Sagebrush Hamlet, directed by Joseph J. Franz (1919)

=== Director ===
- The Painted Lie, co-directed by Robert Broadwell and Crane Wilbur (1917)
- The Eye of Envy (1917)
- The Blood of His Fathers (1917)
- Unto the End (1917)
- Child of M'sieu (1919)

=== Writer ===
- When Baby Forgot, directed by W. Eugene Moore (1917)
