= Anita King =

American racing driver and actress (1884–1963)

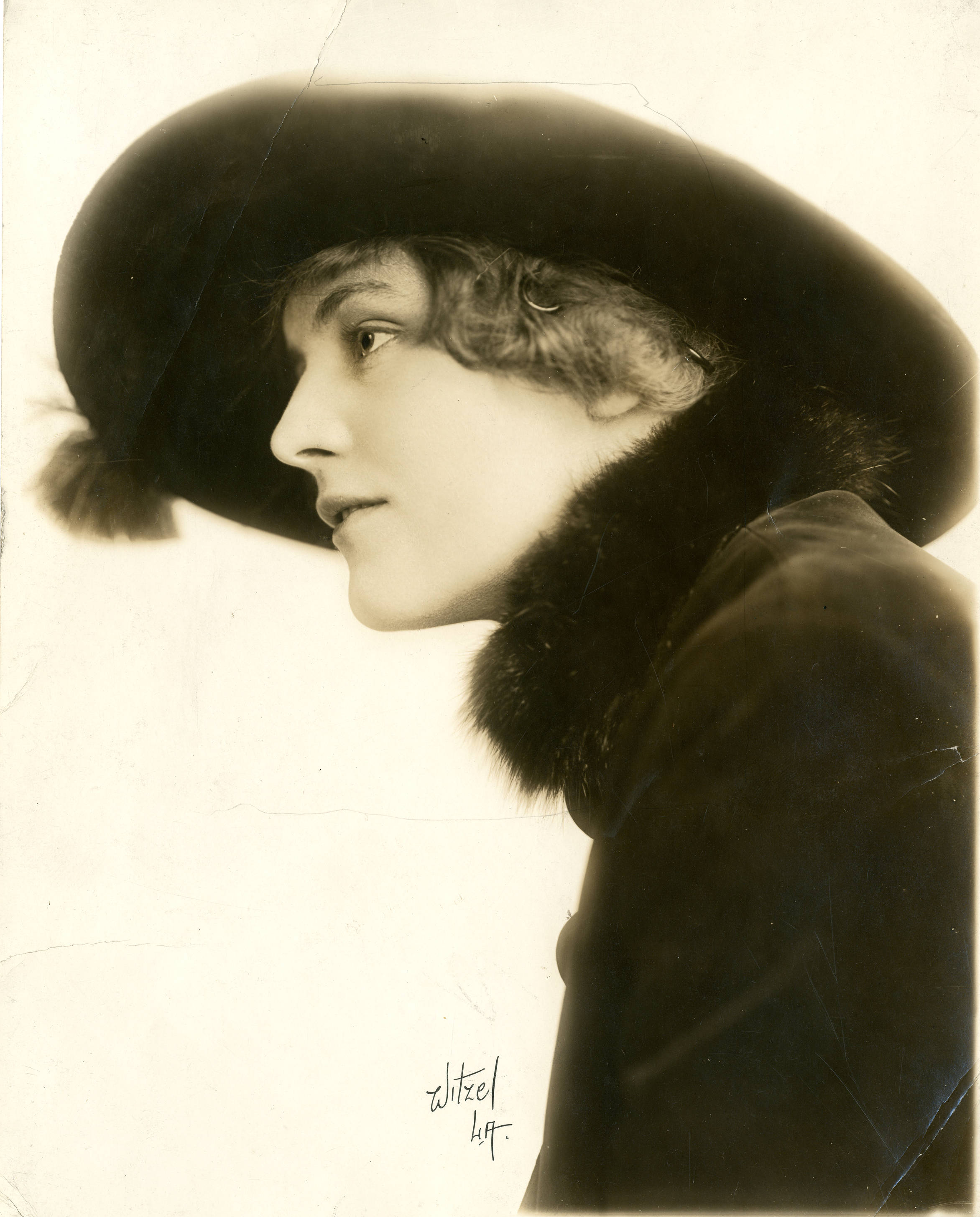
- King in 1919
- Born: Anna Keppen; August 14, 1884; Michigan City, Indiana, U.S.
- Died: June 10, 1963 (aged 78); Hollywood, California, U.S.
- Resting place: Forest Lawn Memorial Park
- Occupations: Stunt driver, actress, racehorse owner
- Spouses: James Stuart McKnight (m. 1919); Thomas Morrison McKenna (m. 1930s)

Anita King (born Anna Keppen; August 14, 1884 – June 10, 1963) was an American stunt driver, actress, and thoroughbred racehorse owner. In 1915, she became the first woman to drive a car unaccompanied across the United States, with her 49-day journey from Hollywood to New York City.

== Early life ==
Born Anna Keppen to German immigrants in Michigan City, Indiana, her father committed suicide in 1896 when she was twelve years old and two years later her mother died of pulmonary tuberculosis. Left an impoverished orphan with siblings, Keppen went to work as a house servant and in her late teens moved to Chicago. There, the attractive young girl found employment doing modeling and acting in minor parts in theatre.

Around 1908 she moved to the West Coast where she developed a fascination with powerful cars after working as a model at California auto shows. Keppen soon learned to drive and by the early 1910s was competing in auto races. The Lasky studio historian, Boswell McGaffey, claimed that she was the first woman automobile racing driver.

Following her hospital recovery from an accident in a race in Phoenix, Arizona, she gave up racing and, with the rapid growth of the Hollywood film industry, returned to acting using the stage name Anita King. Her theatre experience opened the door to roles with the Jesse L. Lasky Feature Play Company under director Cecil B. DeMille.

== Across the United States ==
A film stunt in progress.

In 1915, King decided to put her automobile driving experience to the test and set out to become the first female to drive alone across the continental United States. With the backing of studio boss Jesse L. Lasky, and his newly formed Paramount Pictures, they got the Kissel Motor Car Company to provide her with a vehicle equipped with Firestone tires. Dubbed "The Paramount Girl," amidst much publicity on August 25, she set out in her Kissel Kar from Paramount's studio in Hollywood. The Los Angeles Times wrote, "Her only companions will be a rifle and a six shooter." Lasky arranged for Geraldine Farrar to bid farewell to King at the start of the trip. First heading north to San Francisco, King spent several days doing publicity appearances at the Panama-Pacific World's Fair. With even more fanfare, and declaring that "if men can do it, so can a woman," she headed east. After many promotional stops at Paramount theaters along the way, and coverage by major newspapers coast to coast, on October 19, after forty-nine days on the road, King received a hero's welcome in New York City, with Motor Age remarking she had arrived with "Los Angeles air in the front tires of her car".

== Fame ==
King's accomplishment made her a national celebrity and Paramount Studios quickly began production of a movie version of her trip titled "The Race", directed by George Melford. King made numerous public appearances on behalf of the studio, the Kissel, and Firestone, doing daredevil auto stunts and being photographed with the likes of Barney Oldfield driving his famous Golden Submarine.

She used her fame to do charitable works and helped organize a recreation club for young girls trying to get a start in the film business. In 1918, when the U.S. had become involved in World War I, she made a national speaking tour on behalf of the war effort, driving alone across the southern part of the United States from Los Angeles to Washington, D.C.

King appeared in fourteen films while at Paramount, including four with major star Wallace Reid, but in 1918 left to work with Triangle Film Corporation and other studios. She made her last film in 1919 and with the rapid changes in automotive technology plus new and more spectacular racing events, quickly faded from the public eye. Family members said she did not make it in the "talkies" because she had too low of a voice from years of cigarette smoking.

Her first marriage was to James Stuart McKnight, a National Guard officer serving during World War I in Paris, France. In the early 1930s, she married Thomas Morrison McKenna, a wealthy steelmaker. Widowed in the 1940s, she became part of the Hollywood elite, joining such others as Louis B. Mayer and William Goetz as owners of thoroughbred racehorses. In 1951, jockey Johnny Longden rode her colt Moonrush to victory in the Santa Anita Handicap.

== Death ==
King died of a heart attack in 1963 at her home in Hollywood and is buried at Forest Lawn in Glendale, California.

== Partial filmography ==
- The Man from Home (1914)
- The Virginian (1914)
- Temptation (1915)
- The Girl of the Golden West (1915)
- Snobs (1915)
- The Race (1916)
- Anton the Terrible (1916)
- Maria Rosa (1916)
- The Heir to the Hoorah (1916)
- The Golden Fetter (1917)
- The Squaw Man's Son (1917)

== Other sources ==
- Tejera, P. (2018). Reinas de la carretera. Madrid. Ediciones Casiopea. ISBN 9788494848216 (paper) / ISBN 9788494848223 (digital). Spanish edit.
