= After Five =

1915 film

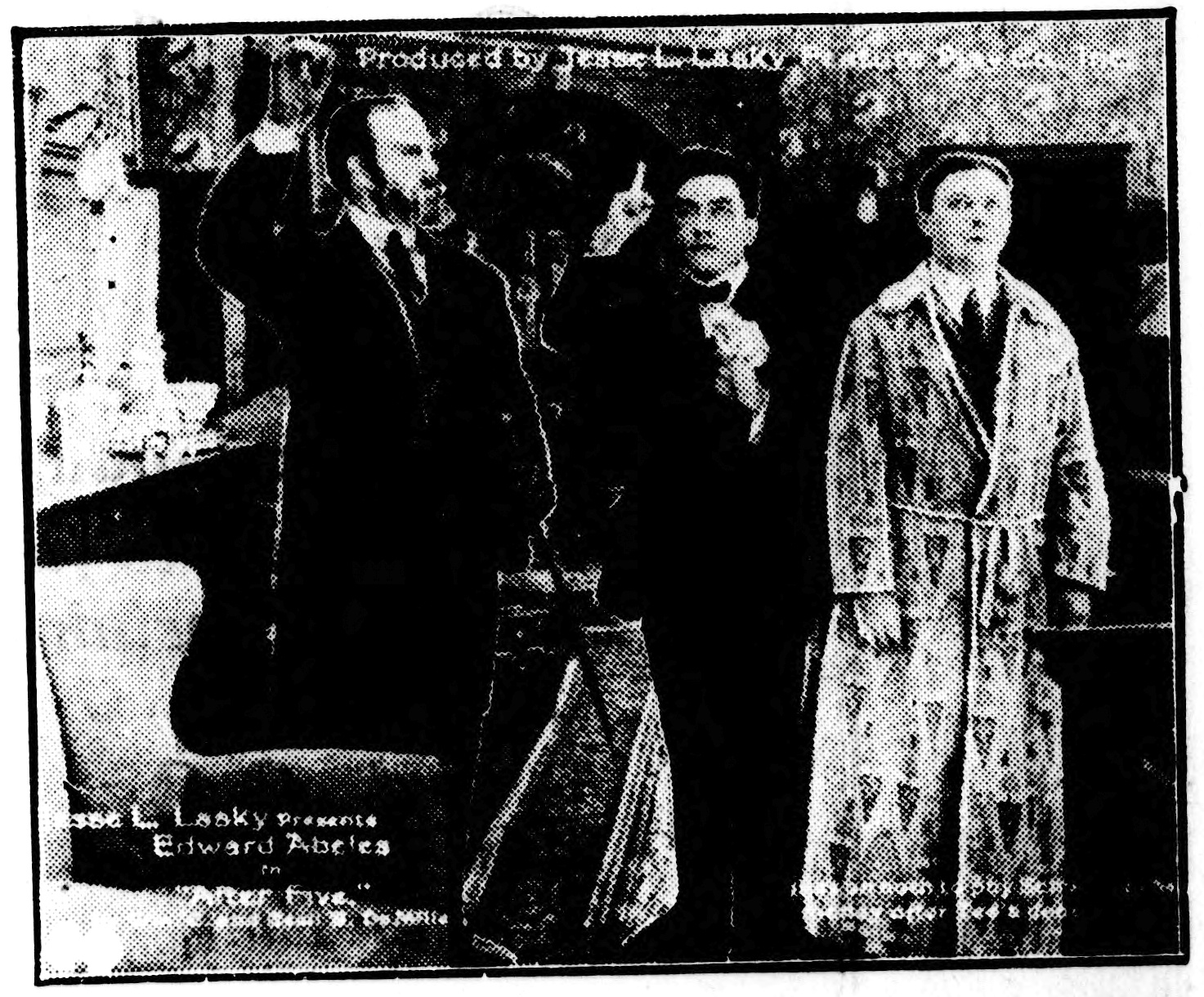
- Publicity photo published in a contemporary newspaper.
- Directed by: Cecil B. DeMille; Oscar Apfel
- Screenplay by: William C. DeMille
- Based on: After Five by Cecil B. DeMille and William C. DeMille
- Starring: Edward Abeles
- Cinematography: Alfredo Gondolf
- Distributed by: Paramount Pictures
- Release date: January 28, 1915
- Running time: 50 minutes
- Country: United States
- Languages: Silent; English intertitles

After Five is a lost 1915 American silent thriller comedy film directed by Cecil B. DeMille and Oscar Apfel. Based on the play of the same name by DeMille and his brother William, the film stars Edward Abeles.

== Plot ==
Ted Ewing invests both his own and the money of his fiancée, Nora Heldreth, when a broker friend offers big investment returns. After the broker friend disappears, though, Ewing believes that he has squandered their money, and sets out on a course of action to recover it. He takes out a life insurance policy and then tries to get himself "accidentally" killed. His numerous attempts are to no avail. Next he hires some strong arms to kill him since they have apparently been following him anyway. He gives the money for his murder for hire to his valet, Oki. But then the broker returns and Ewing discovers that his investment has doubled! With the strong arms after him, Ewing must straighten out the situation before it's too late.

== Cast ==
- Edward Abeles as Ted Ewing
- Sessue Hayakawa as Oki, the Valet
- Betty Schade as Nora Hildreth
- Jane Darwell as Mrs. Russell, 'Aunt Diddy'
- Theodore Roberts as Bruno Schwartz
- Monroe Salisbury as Sam Parker
- James Neil
- Ernest Joy
- Jode Mullally
- Ernest Garcia

== Preservation ==
With no holdings located in archives, After Five is considered a lost film.
