= Jode Mullally =

American silent film actor

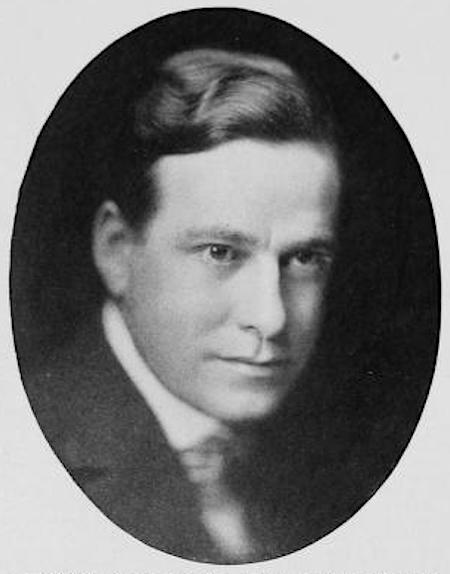
- Born: Joseph T. Mullally; November 19, 1886; New Orleans, Louisiana, U.S.
- Died: December 29, 1918 (aged 32); Philadelphia, Pennsylvania, U.S.
- Resting place: Metairie Cemetery, New Orleans
- Occupation: Actor
- Years active: 1914–18

Joseph T. "Jode" Mullally (November 19, 1886 – December 29, 1918) was an early American silent film actor born in New Orleans. He appeared in several productions by Cecil B. DeMille and Oscar Apfel. Upon America's entry into World War I, Mullally joined the Navy and reached the rank of Quartermaster. A rising favorite with director DeMille his career was shortened when he died of the Spanish flu in December 1918.

== Selected filmography ==
- The Call of the North (1914)
- Ready Money (1914)
- The Man from Home (1914)
- The Circus Man (1914)
- The Ghost Breaker (1914)
- Cameo Kirby (1914)
- After Five (1915)
- Snobs (1915)
- The Eye of Envy (1917)
- The Blood of His Fathers (1917)
