= Helen Marlborough =

American actress (1867–1955)

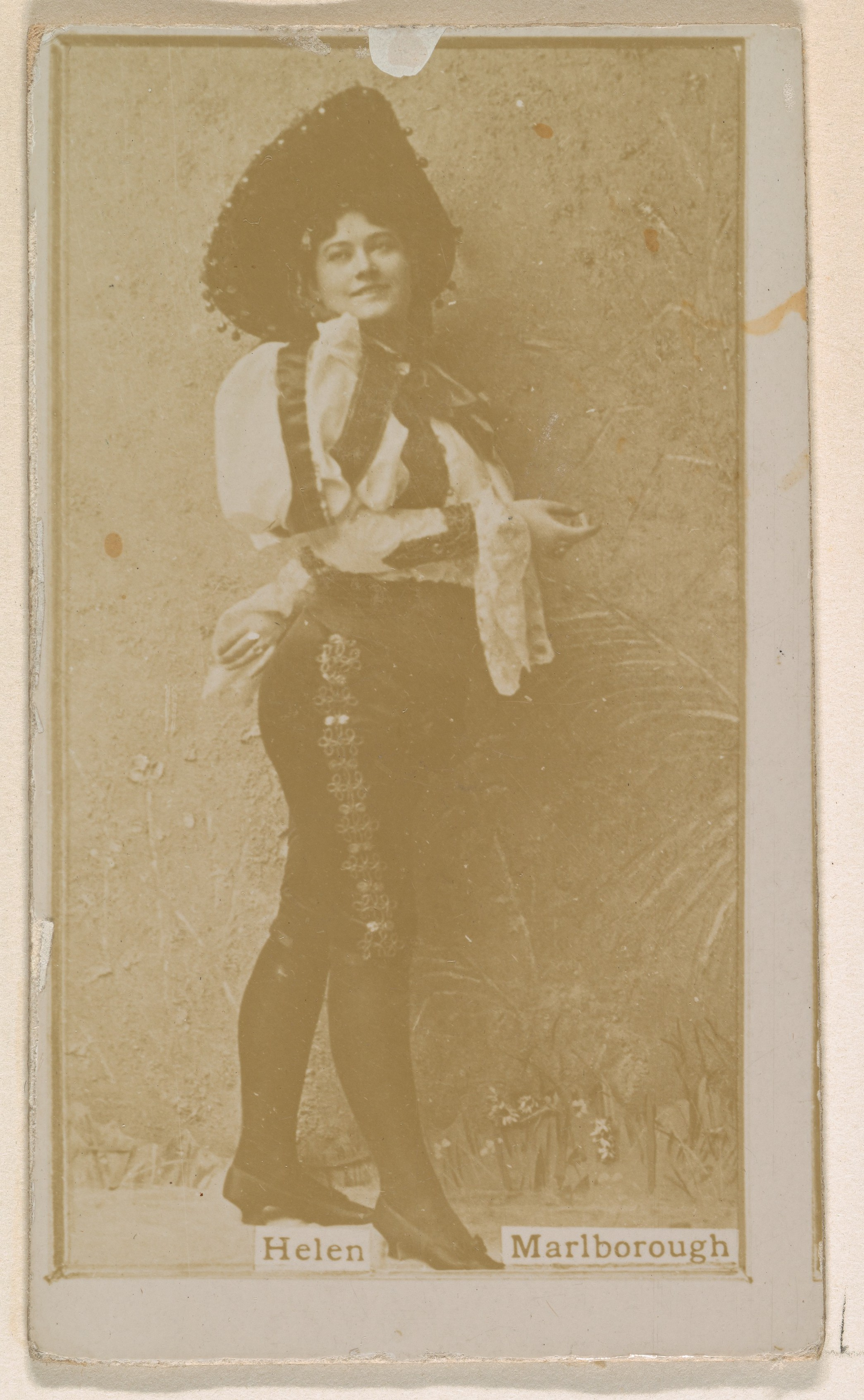
- Born: Helen Viola Marlborough; January 1, 1867; California
- Died: August 27, 1955 (aged 88); Pasadena, California
- Resting place: Mountain View Cemetery, Altadena, California
- Occupation: Actor

Helen Marlborough (1867 - 1955) was an American stage and screen actress. As a young woman she was slim and svelt but as she aged she was reduced to playing character parts. Marlborough bore a strong resemblance to May Irwin. She started her career in the 1890s performing in several revivals of the play 1492. Her listed appearances in silent films are few though she may have appeared in many films, now lost, uncredited. She died August 27, 1955.

== Selected filmography ==
- The Wild Goose Chase (1915)
- The Incorrigible Dukane (1915) (*uncredited)
- An Innocent Crook (1916)
- The Tongues of Men (1916)
