= The Incorrigible Dukane =

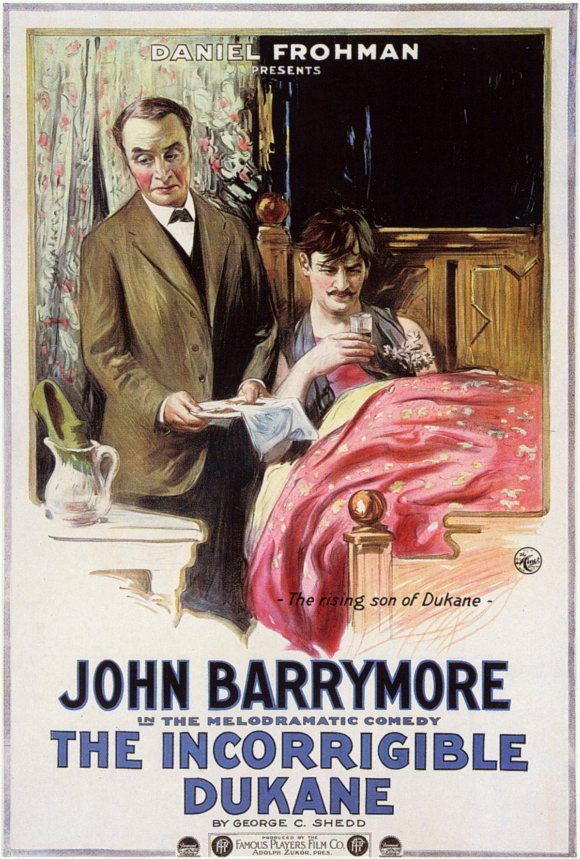
- The Incorrigible Dukane theatrical poster
- Directed by: James Durkin
- Based on: The Incorrigible Dukane by George Clifford Shedd
- Produced by: Daniel Frohman; Adolph Zukor
- Starring: John Barrymore; Helen Weir
- Cinematography: William F. Wagner
- Production company: Famous Players Film Company
- Distributed by: Paramount Pictures Corp.
- Release date: September 2, 1915
- Running time: 40 minutes
- Country: United States
- Language: Silent (English intertitles)

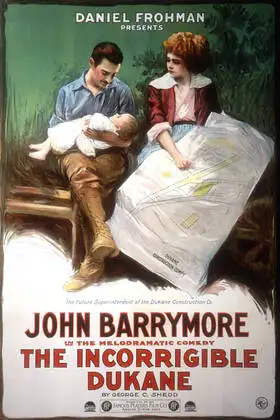
lobby poster with scene depicted in the movie.

The Incorrigible Dukane is a 1915 silent dramedy and farce produced by Daniel Frohman and released by Famous Players Film Company. Directed by James Durkin, it stars John Barrymore in his fifth feature film. Adapted from the novel (Note: Some contemporary sources make it a play rather than a novel, but AFI found no confirmation of this.) of the same name by George C. Shedd, it is the earliest known surviving John Barrymore feature film.

== Synopsis ==
Through mistaken identity, a rich contractor's son is impressed into the labor force building his own father's dam at Silver Peak. When construction of a dam in Silver Peak, Colorado threatens their land, rancher Crofton (William MacDonald) and his daughter Enid (Helen Weir) confront New York contractor James Dukane, Sr. (William T. Carleton). Dukane sends his son James "Jimmy" Dukane, Jr. (John Barrymore) to manage construction and to deal with the dam's impact on the locals, hoping that the task will help his son mature. However, en route to the construction site, Jimmy is waylaid by a vagabond, and his clothing and identification are stolen. Dressed in the tramp's clothes, Jimmy finally meets with the construction foreman Corbetson (Stewart Baird), who scoffs at his claimed identity and instead puts him to work with a pick and shovel. During his labors, Jimmy learns that Corbetson has been using sub-par materials and embezzling monies from Dukane Sr, and that to hide his crime, Corbetson is planning to blow up the dam.

== Cast ==
- John Barrymore as James Dukane Jr.
- William T. Carleton as James Dukane Sr.
- Helen Weir as Enid Crofton
- Stewart Baird as Corbetson
- William MacDonald as Enid's father
- William Meech as Lantry

uncredited

- Helen Marlborough - Charwoman

== Production ==
The Incorrigible Dukane was Barrymore's fifth feature film as well as his fifth film under contract to Famous Players. It was James Durkin's first directorial effort for Famous Players.

== Style ==
The Day said that the film had "crystal clear photography [and] homey, every day realistic and intensely interesting settings" that made it a "superb production". Joseph W. Garton said in his book, The film acting of John Barrymore, that the "direction and photography are adequate" and that the "well developed narrative line is unusually strong".

== Critical reception ==
Reviews in the Motion Picture News and the New York Dramatic Mirror were positive, generally acknowledging Barrymore as the main attraction. The New York trade paper Review called it the "best acrobatic show in town". George Blaisdell in Moving Picture World pointed out a few directorial slips, but still predicted that the film would be liked. Variety's Sime Silverman gave it a negative notice, writing, "... 'comedy' is a misnomer unless one will accept as funny John Barrymore's attempts to imitate Charlie Chaplin."

The Day called the film a "straightforward story told in a hearty boyish style with all the merriment of youth crowded into the four parts required to unfold the plot". The Meriden Morning Record considered it to be a "lively and very enjoyable photoplay". The Grey River Argus said that it was a "splendid drama" that, in terms of Barrymore, "gives us that legitimate actor in his happiest vein". The Ohinemuri Gazette considered it to be a "picture that will be enjoyed by everyone". The New Zealand Truth described it as a "thoroughly amusing filmatisation" and that it had "some exciting scenes during the industrial flare-up and plenty of dramatic and humorous happenings".

== Preservation ==
This film is extant. A 35mm print is preserved in the George Eastman House Motion Picture Collection, and another print is in the BFI National Archive. Of Barrymore's earliest performances on film, encompassing a few shorts for Lubin and ten feature films for Famous Players, all are presumed lost except this one.

== See also ==
- John Barrymore on stage, screen and radio
