= Maria Rosa (1916 film) =

1916 film

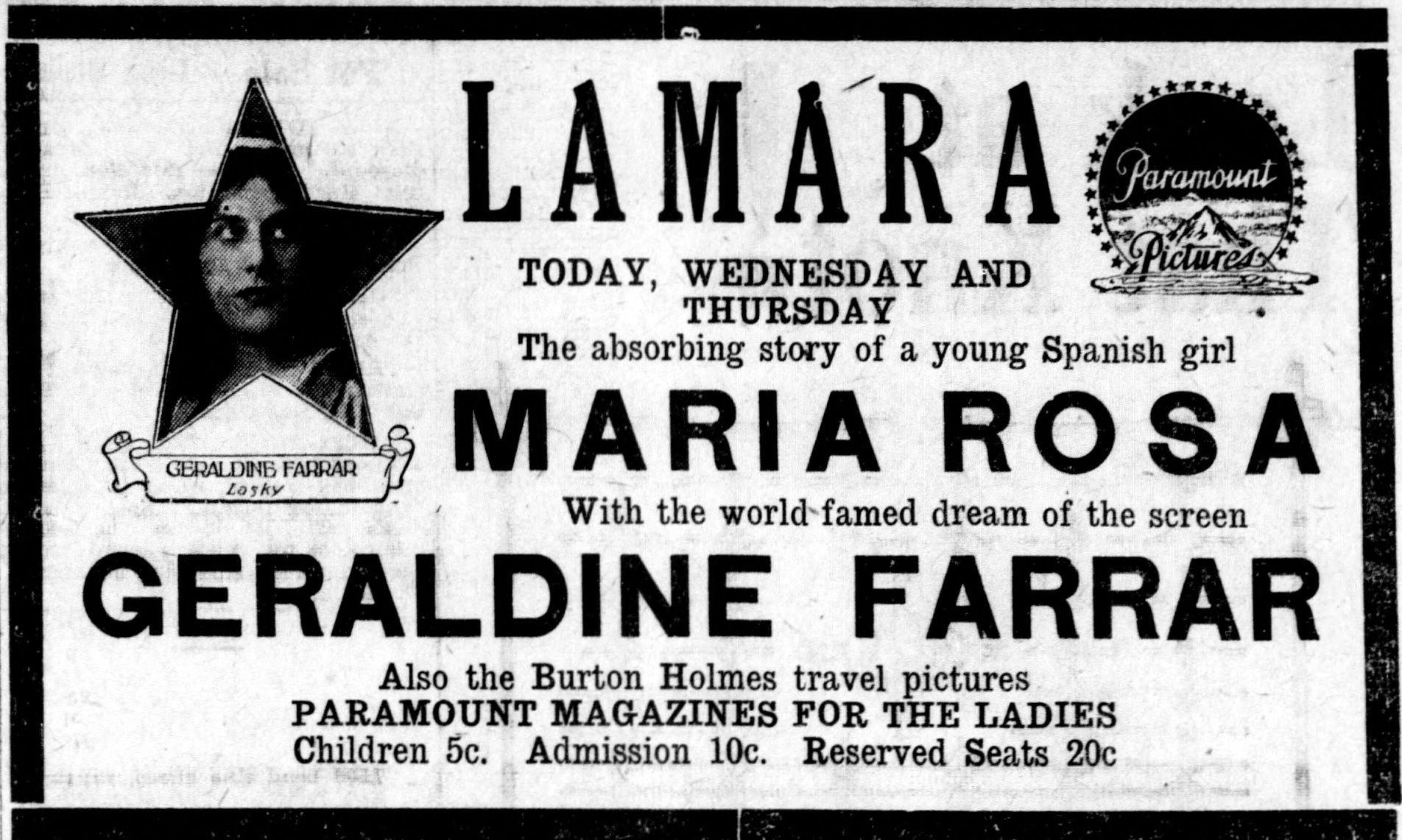
- Newspaper advertisement
- Directed by: Cecil B. DeMille
- Written by: William C. deMille; Wallace Gilpatrick; Àngel Guimerà; Guido Marburg
- Produced by: Cecil B. DeMille; Jesse L. Lasky
- Starring: Geraldine Farrar
- Cinematography: Alvin Wyckoff
- Edited by: Cecil B. DeMille
- Distributed by: Famous Players–Lasky
- Release date: May 7, 1916
- Running time: 50 minutes
- Country: United States
- Language: Silent with English intertitles
- Budget: $18,547
- Box office: $102,767

Maria Rosa is a surviving 1916 American silent drama film directed by Cecil B. DeMille. It was based on a 1914 Broadway stage play Maria Rosa by Àngel Guimerà. On the stage the principal parts were played by Dorothy Donnelly and Lou Tellegen, future husband of this film's star Geraldine Farrar.

== Cast ==
- Geraldine Farrar as Maria Rosa
- Wallace Reid as Andreas
- Pedro de Cordoba as Ramon
- James Neill as The Priest
- Ernest Joy as Carlos
- Horace B. Carpenter as Pedro
- Anita King as Ana, Carlos' Wife

== Preservation ==
The film is preserved at the George Eastman Museum and the BFI National Archive.
