= Titanic (1915 film) =

- Directed by: Pier Angelo Mazzolotti
- Starring: Mario Bonnard; Giovanni Casaleggio; Pierino Chiesa
- Cinematography: Luigi Filippa
- Production company: Bonnard Film
- Distributed by: Bonnard Film
- Release date: April 1915
- Country: Italy
- Languages: Silent; Italian intertitles

Titanic is a 1915 Italian silent film directed by Pier Angelo Mazzolotti and starring Mario Bonnard, Giovanni Casaleggio and Pierino Chiesa. Despite its title, the film is not about the sinking of the RMS Titanic but about the discovery of a mineral of the same name.

== Cast ==
- Mario Bonnard
- Giovanni Casaleggio
- Pierino Chiesa
- Elide De Sevres
- Luigi Duse
- Felice Metellio

== Bibliography ==
- Bottomore, Stephen. The Titanic and Silent Cinema. The Projection Box, 2000.
