= The Wild Goose Chase (1915 film) =

1915 film

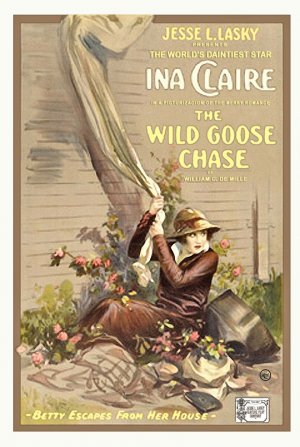
- Film poster
- Directed by: Cecil B. DeMille
- Written by: William C. deMille
- Produced by: Cecil B. DeMille; Jesse L. Lasky
- Starring: Ina Claire
- Cinematography: Alvin Wyckoff
- Edited by: Cecil B. DeMille
- Production company: Jesse Lasky Features
- Distributed by: Paramount Pictures
- Release date: May 27, 1915
- Running time: 40 minutes
- Country: United States
- Language: Silent (English intertitles)
- Budget: $10,611.85
- Box office: $60,630.68

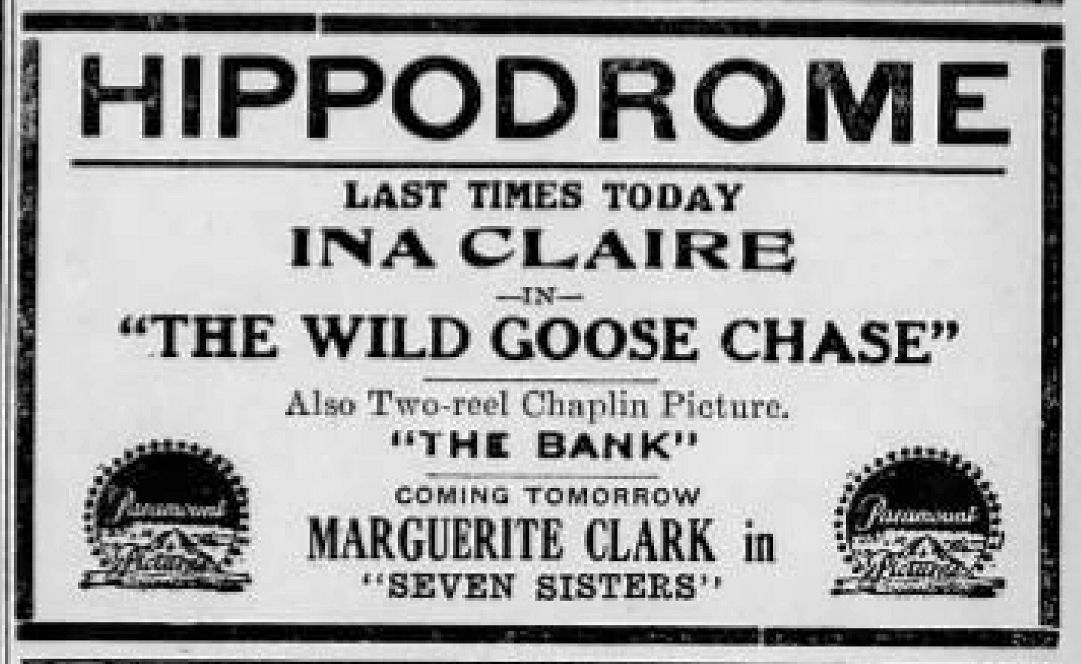
Advertisement for the film, Allentown, Pennsylvania

The Wild Goose Chase is a 1915 American silent comedy-drama film directed by Cecil B. DeMille. The film was written by DeMille's brother William and starred Ina Claire. The Wild Goose Chase is now considered a lost film.

== Cast ==
- Ina Claire as Betty Wright
- Lucien Littlefield as The 'Grind'
- Helen Marlborough as Mrs. Wright
- Raymond Hatton as Mr. Wright
- Tom Forman as Bob Randall
- Ernest Joy as Mr. Randall
- Theodore Roberts as Horatio Brutus Bangs
- Tex Driscoll (uncredited)
- Mrs. Lewis McCord (uncredited)
- Florence Smythe as Mrs. Randall (uncredited)
- Jane Wolfe (uncredited)

== See also ==
- List of lost films
