= James Neill (actor) =

American actor (1860–1931)

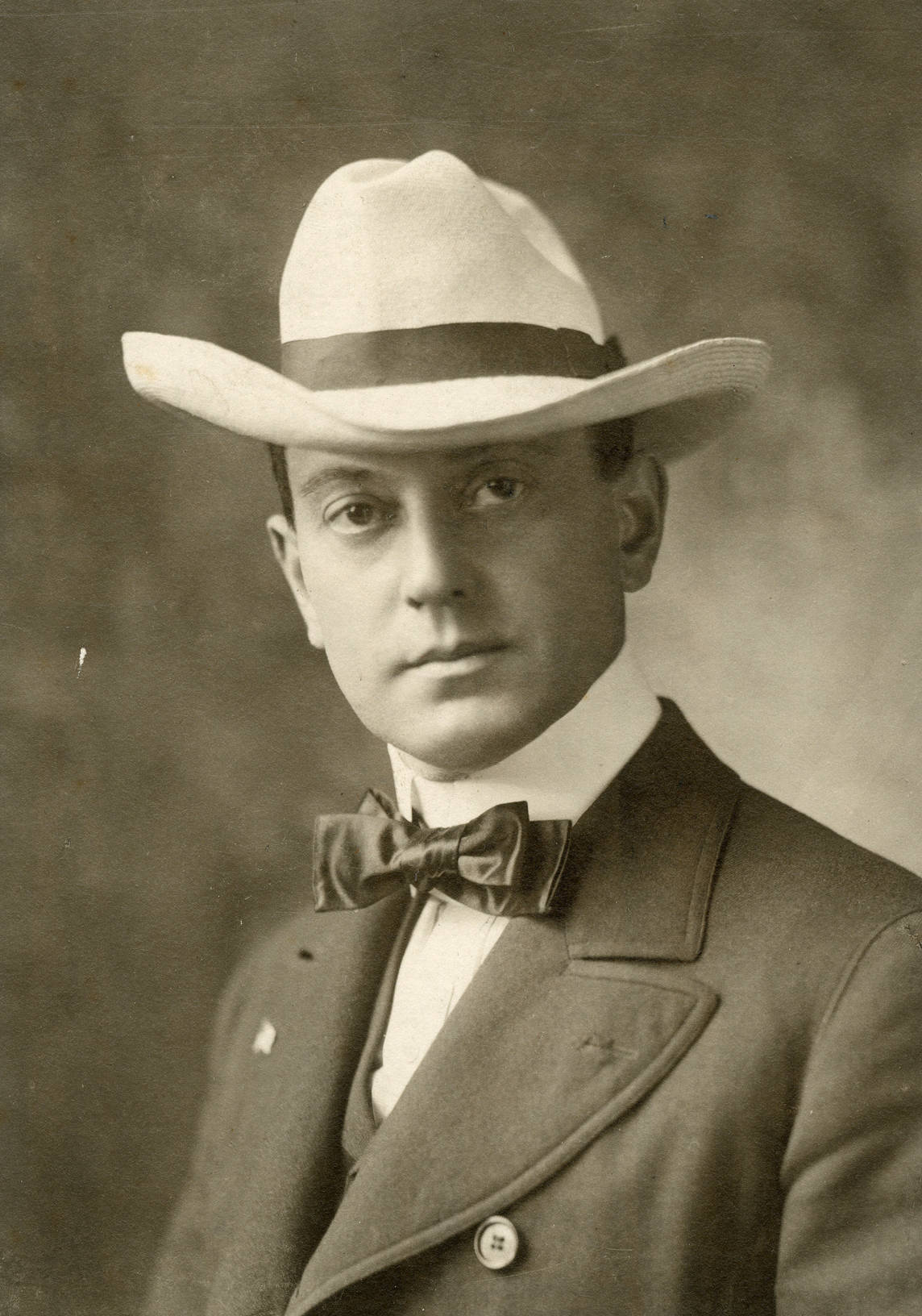
- Neill c. 1906
- Born: September 29, 1860
- Died: March 16, 1931 (aged 70)
- Education: University of Georgia
- Occupation: Actor
- Years active: 1882–1930
- Spouse: Edythe Chapman (m.1897)

James F. Neill (September 29, 1860 – March 16, 1931) was an American stage actor and film actor of the silent era. He appeared in more than 110 films between 1913 and 1930.

== Biography ==
After graduating from the University of Georgia in 1882, James Neill embarked on a theatrical career which spanned nearly fifty years with stage appearances in every state in the Union, the territories (including Hawaii), and the provinces of Canada, in addition to film appearances in the studios of many of the major early Hollywood producers.

"The occasion of spring vacation during his senior year at the University of Georgia was marked by the first amateur theatrical appearance of young James F. Neill. The April 11, 1882, program for the Savannah Theatre included a listing of the Veteran Guard Cadets, a 'military drill team and chorus,' as part of the evening’s entertainment provided by the Ford Dramatic Amateur Society. Neill listed this as his 'first appearance on any stage, as one of the...Cadets.'"

"At the end of the 1884-85 season, Neill returned to Savannah with a play he had written and he persuaded J. C. Shaw, of what was now called the Ford Dramatic Association, to produce the new work as part of the seventh annual summer season of the group. On the evening of June 18, 1885, the Savannah Theatre was the locale for the first performance on any stage of Mr. James Neill’s romantic four-act drama -- Chip Redmond: or the Moonshine Maid."

In 1893, Neill organized the first summer stock theatre company for that season at the Elitch Theatre, Denver. The company's roster of actors included: Lilian Dailey, Marion Earle, Alfred Hampton, Jane Kenmark, Hudson Liston, Millie Liston, Charles Lothian, Jeanette Lowrey, James Neill himself, Frank E. Norcross, Bernard Reynold, and Weevie Vivian. The following year, James Neill and R.L. Giffen organized a company for the Manhattan Beach in Denver, with a roster of actors including: Anne Blancke, Kate Blancke, Alfred Burnham, Harry Corson Clarke, Henrietta Crosman, Josepha Crowell, Zula Hanes, William Ingersoll, John B. Maher, James Neill, and Mary Ryan as players, and with Alfred Fisher as stage director. In September 1894, Neill and Giffen also organized the first winter stock company at the Lyceum Theatre, Denver. Another company was placed in Salt Lake City in December 1894 under the management of T. Daniel Frawley, who later purchased the Neill-Giffen interests and moved the organization to San Francisco.

James Neill was fifty-three years old when he appeared in his first Hollywood film, The Passerby, in 1913.

His second wife, and frequent costar on stage and screen, was Edythe Chapman.

== Partial filmography ==
- The Passerby (director) (1913)
- Red Margaret, Moonshiner (1913)
- Bloodhounds of the North (1913)
- The Heart of a Cracksman (1913)
- The Lie (1914)
- The Honor of the Mounted (1914)
- Discord and Harmony (1914)
- The Man on the Box (1914)
- Richelieu (1914)
- The Man from Home (1914)
- Rose of the Rancho (1914)
- The Goose Girl (1915)
- After Five (1915)
- The Warrens of Virginia (1915)
- The Woman (1915)
- The Cheat (1915)
- The Ragamuffin (1916)
- Maria Rosa (1916)
- The Dream Girl (1916)
- The House with the Golden Windows (1916)
- Oliver Twist (1916)
- Joan the Woman (1917)
- The Devil-Stone (1917)
- Jules of the Strong Heart (1918)
- The Whispering Chorus (1918)
- Say! Young Fellow (1918)
- We Can't Have Everything (1918)
- Women's Weapons (1918)
- The Way of a Man with a Maid (1918)
- Don't Change Your Husband (1919)
- Men, Women, and Money (1919)
- Her Kingdom of Dreams (1919)
- Everywoman (1919)
- The Little Shepherd of Kingdom Come (1920)
- The Paliser Case (1920)
- A Double-Dyed Deceiver (1920)
- Stop Thief! (1920)
- A Voice in the Dark (1921)
- Bits of Life (1921)
- Dangerous Curve Ahead (1921)
- Her Husband's Trademark (1922)
- Saturday Night (1922)
- The Heart Specialist (1922)
- Our Leading Citizen (1922)
- Manslaughter (1922)
- The World's Applause (1923)
- The Lonely Road (1923)
- The Ten Commandments (1923) – Aaron
- The Thrill Chaser (1923)
- New Brooms (1925)
- The Crimson Runner (1925)
- Thank You (1925)
- A Desperate Moment (1926)
- The King of Kings (1927)
- Three-Ring Marriage (1928)
- The Border Patrol (1928)
- The Idle Rich (1929)
- Shooting Straight (1930)
