= Pier Angelo Mazzolotti =

Italian screenwriter and film director

Pier Angelo Mazzolotti (1890–1972) was an Italian screenwriter and film director of the silent era. He directed the 1915 film Titanic which, despite its title, is not about the sinking of the RMS Titanic.

== Selected filmography ==
=== Screenwriter ===
- Emperor Maciste (1924)
- Saetta Learns to Live (1924)
- Beauty of the World (1927)
- The Carnival of Venice (1928)

=== Director ===
- Titanic (1915)
- The Fugitive (1921)

== Sources ==
- Bottomore, Stephen. The Titanic and Silent Cinema. The Projection Box, 2000.
