= Temptation (1915 film) =

1915 film

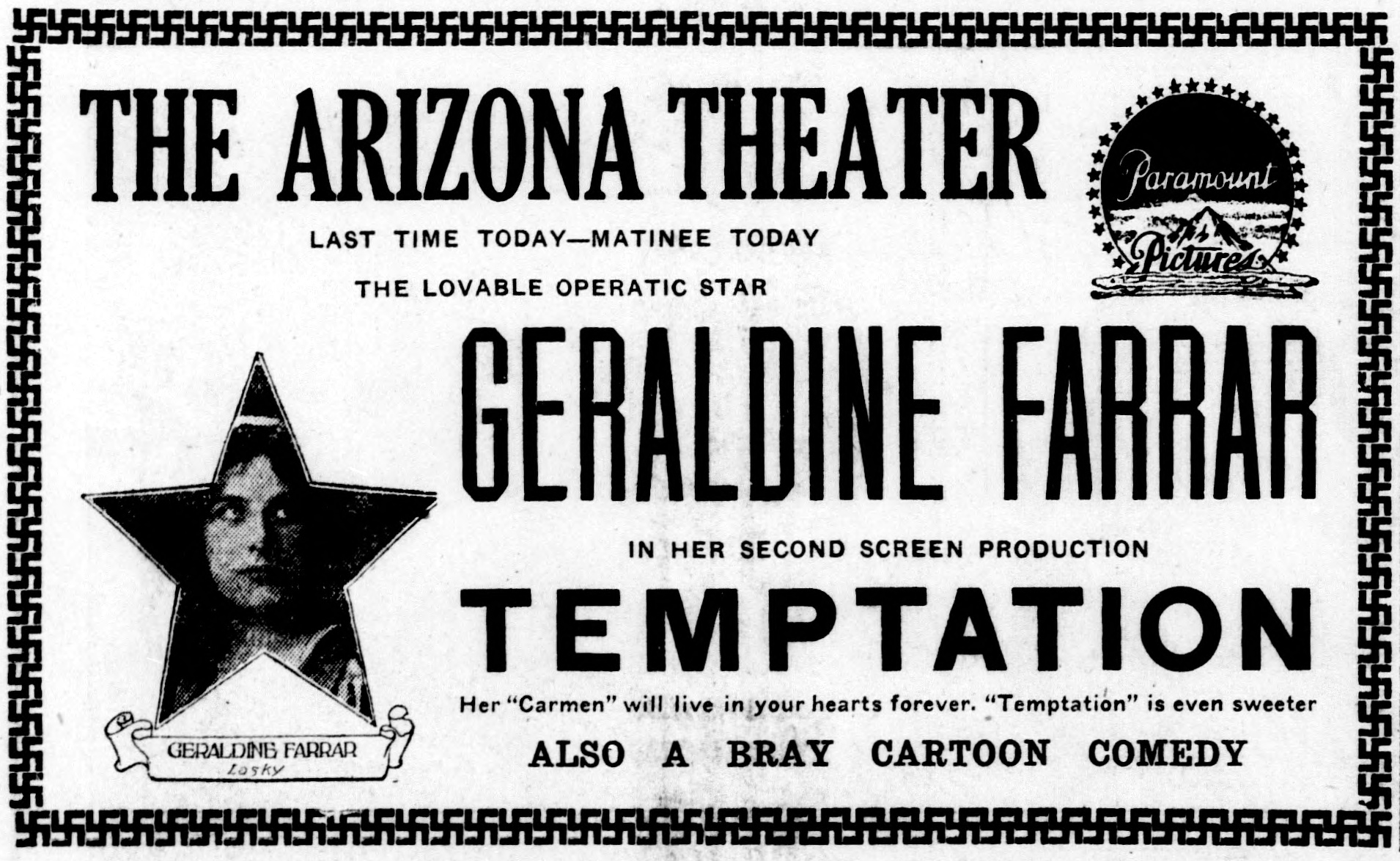
- Contemporary newspaper advertisement
- Directed by: Cecil B. DeMille
- Written by: Hector Turnbull; Cecil B. DeMille (uncredited); Jeanie MacPherson (uncredited)
- Story by: Hector Turnbull
- Produced by: Cecil B. DeMille; Jesse L. Lasky
- Starring: Geraldine Farrar; Theodore Roberts
- Cinematography: Alvin Wyckoff
- Edited by: Cecil B. DeMille
- Production company: Jesse Lasky Feature Plays
- Distributed by: Paramount Pictures
- Release date: December 30, 1915
- Running time: 60 minutes
- Country: United States
- Languages: Silent; English intertitles
- Budget: $22,472.25
- Box office: $102,437.47

Temptation is a lost 1915 American silent romantic drama film directed and produced by Cecil B. DeMille. The film starred Geraldine Farrar and Theodore Roberts and was written by and based on an original story by Hector Turnbull. Additional writing was done by DeMille and Jeanie MacPherson, who did not receive screen credit.

== Cast ==
- Geraldine Farrar as Renee Dupree
- Theodore Roberts as Otto Mueller
- Pedro de Cordoba as Julian
- Elsie Jane Wilson as Madame Maroff
- Raymond Hatton as Baron Cheurial
- Sessue Hayakawa as Opera Admirer
- Jessie Arnold (uncredited)
- Tex Driscoll (uncredited)
- Ernest Joy (uncredited)
- Anita King (uncredited)
- Lucien Littlefield (uncredited)

== Preservation ==
With no prints of Temptation located in any film archives, it is considered a lost film.

== See also ==
- List of lost films
