= Hector Turnbull =

American screenwriter

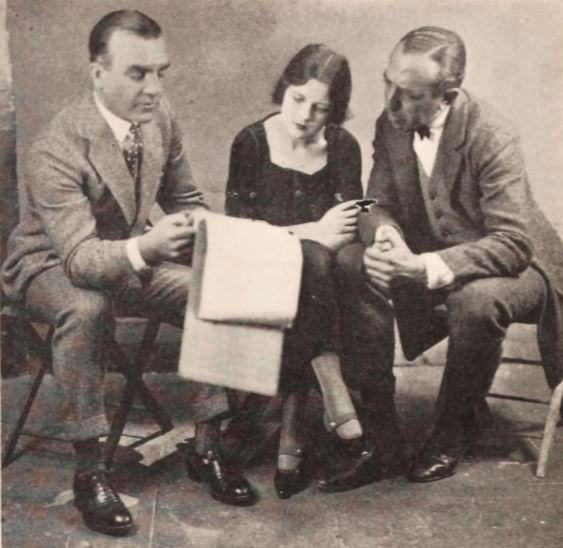
- Hector Turnbull reviewing a script for A Private Scandal (1921) with May McAvoy and director Chester Franklin
- Born: September 11, 1884; Arlington, New Jersey, US
- Died: April 8, 1934 (aged 49); New Hope, Pennsylvania, US
- Occupation: Screenwriter
- Years active: 1915–1937

Hector Turnbull (September 11, 1884 – April 8, 1934) was an American screenwriter and film producer. He wrote for 25 films between 1915 and 1937. He was born in Arlington, New Jersey and died in New Hope, Pennsylvania from a heart attack.

== Selected filmography ==
- The Cheat (1915)
- Temptation (1915)
- The Heart of Nora Flynn (1916)
- Alien Souls (1916)
- Less Than the Dust (1916)
- The Evil Eye (1917)
- Everything for Sale (1921)
- My American Wife (1922)
- Mantrap (1926)
- Casey at the Bat (1927)
- Underworld (1927)
- Marked Money (1928)
- Morocco (1930)
- The Cheat (1931)
- The Cheat (1937, original screenplay)
