= Theodore Roberts =

American actor (1861–1928)

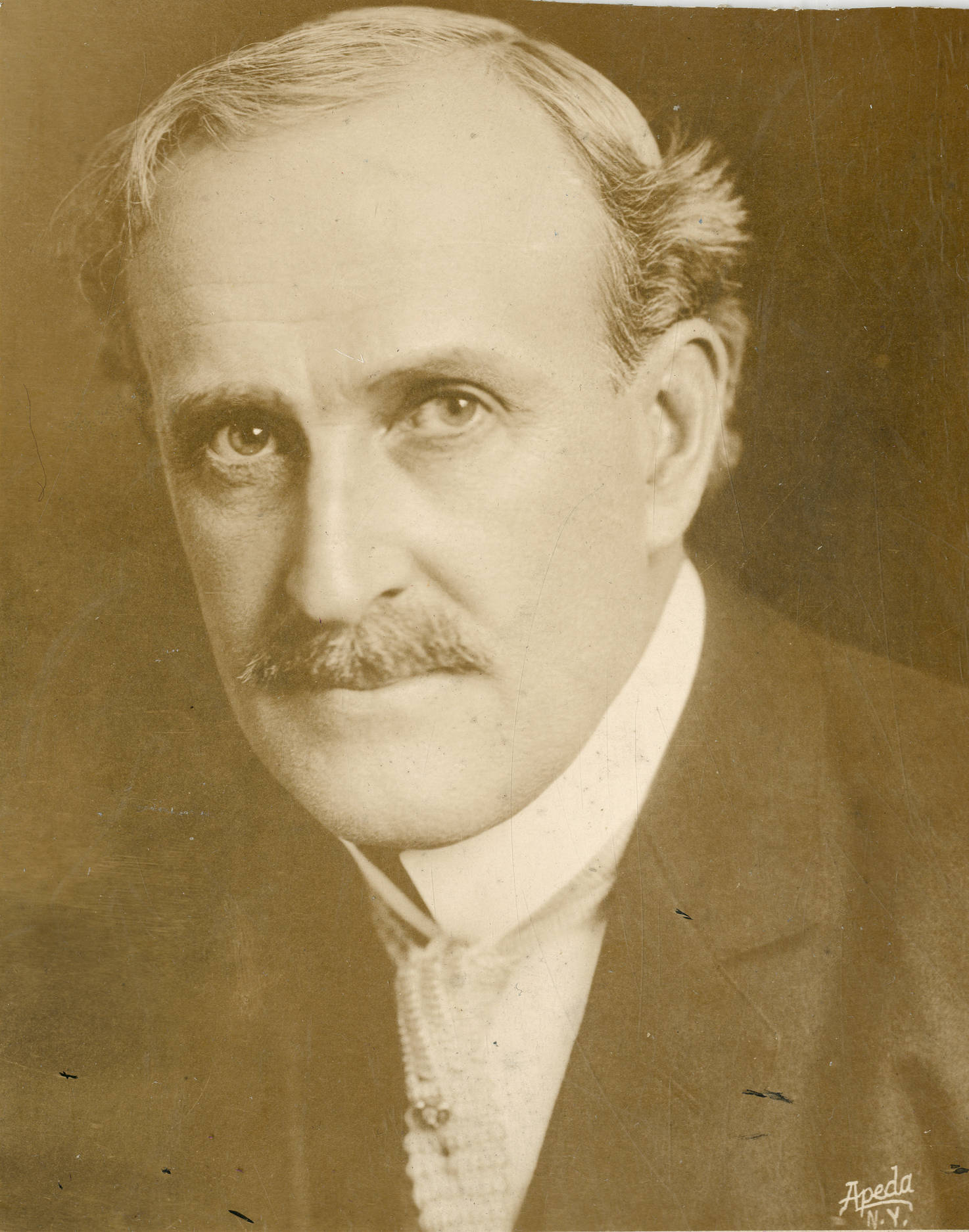
- Roberts in 1912
- Born: October 8, 1861; San Francisco, California, U.S.
- Died: December 14, 1928 (aged 67); Hollywood, California, U.S.
- Resting place: Hollywood Forever; Pineland 124
- Occupations: Film, stage actor
- Spouses: Lucy O'Brien (m. 1890; div. 1905) Florence Smythe (m. 1905; died 1925)
- Relatives: Florence Roberts (cousin)

Theodore Roberts (October 8, 1861 – December 14, 1928) was an American film and stage actor.

== Early life ==
Roberts was born in San Francisco, California. He was a cousin of the stage actress Florence Roberts. His choice of a career disappointed his mother (who wanted him to become a minister) and his father (who wanted him to learn a trade).

== Career ==
Roberts debuted on stage at the Baldwin Theatre in San Francisco in 1880. He went on to act with a barnstorming troupe on the West Coast but tired of that lifestyle after several years and left acting for a time to command a schooner owned by his father.

On stage again in the 1890s he acted with Fanny Davenport in her play Gismonda (1894) and later in The Bird of Paradise (1912). His Broadway career began with We'Uns of Tennessee (1899) and ended with Believe Me Xantippe (1913).

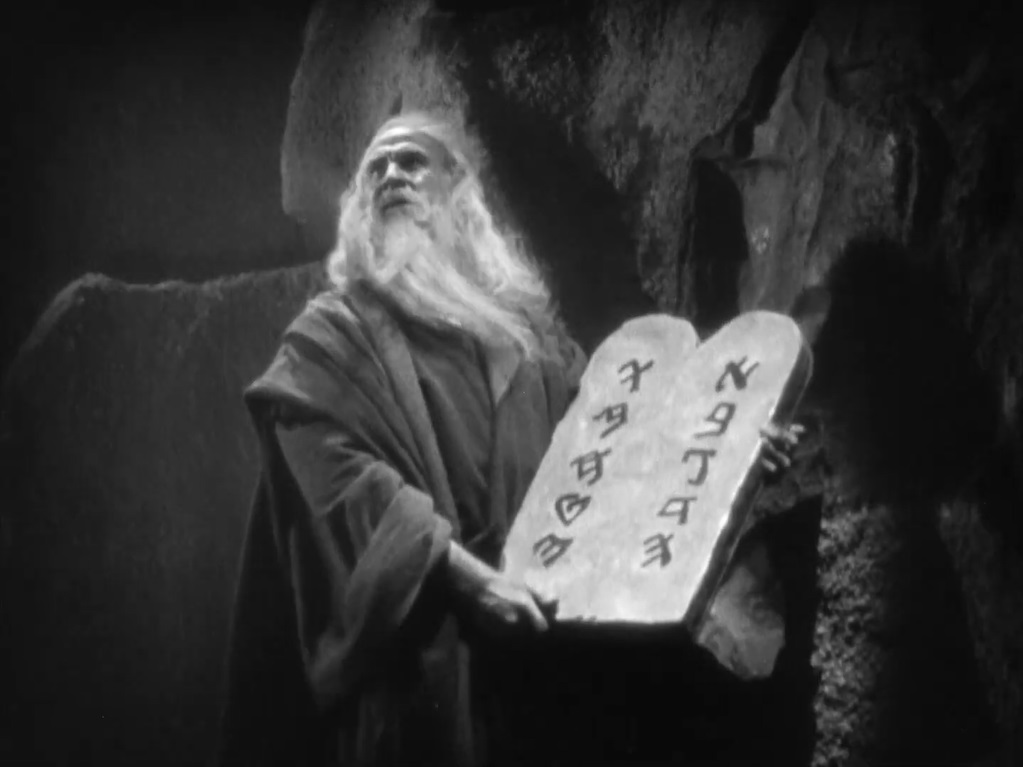
Roberts as Moses in Cecil B. DeMille's The Ten Commandments (1923)

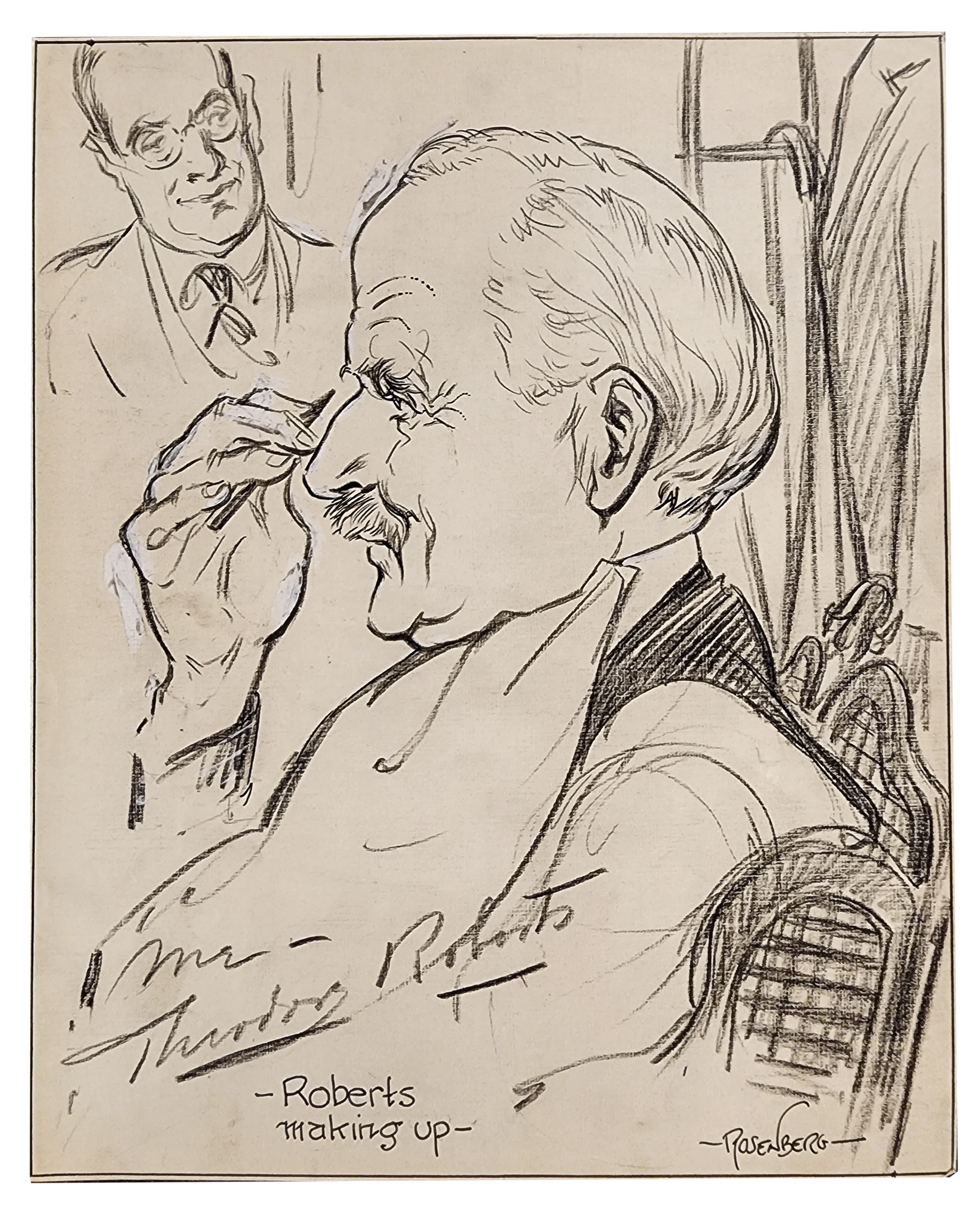
Signed drawing of Theodore Roberts by Manuel Rosenberg for the Cincinnati Post, 1926

He started his film career in the 1910s in Hollywood, and was often associated in the productions of Cecil B. DeMille. He portrayed Moses in the biblical prologue of DeMille's The Ten Commandments (1923). One of his last film appearances was as the heroine's father in The Cat's Pajamas (1926).

Roberts also performed in vaudeville. After the end of a marriage, he spent six months in a New York jail because he refused to pay alimony.

== Death ==
Roberts died of uremic poisoning in Hollywood, California at age 67 and is buried in Hollywood Forever Cemetery.

== Selected filmography ==
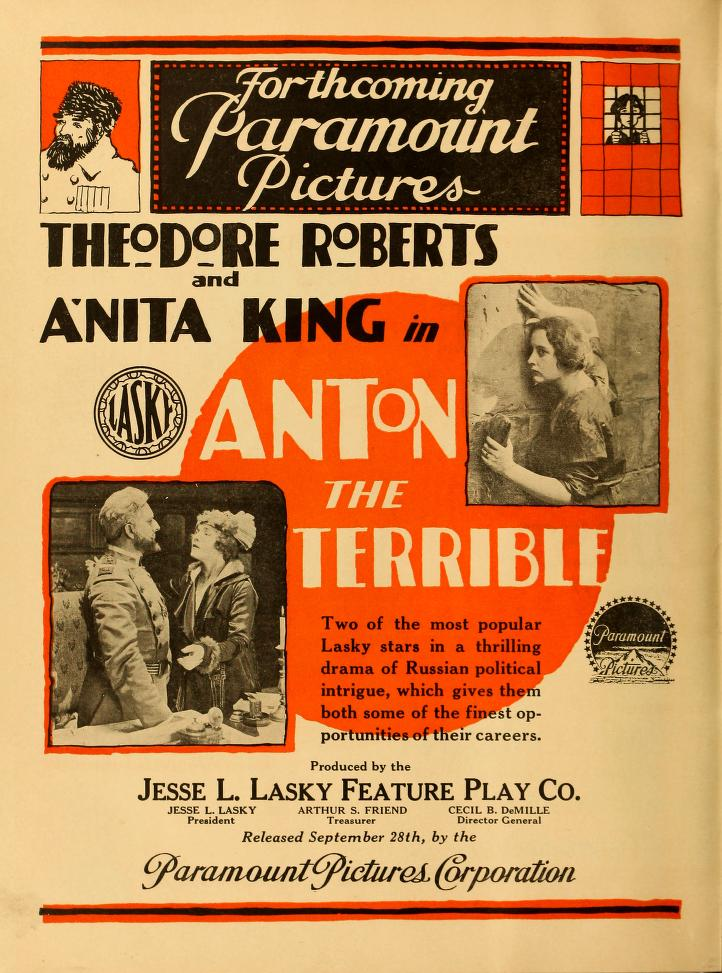
Advertisement for Anton the Terrible in Moving Picture World, 1916

Year	Title
1914	The Ghost Breaker
1914	The Man from Home
1914	What's His Name
1914	The Call of the North
1915	Temptation
1915	The Arab
1915	The Wild Goose Chase
1915	The Woman
1915	The Captive
1915	The Unafraid
1915	After Five
1915	The Girl of the Golden West
1915	The Unknown
1916	The Trail of the Lonesome Pine
1916	The Dream Girl
1916	Common Ground
1916	The Storm
1917	Nan of Music Mountain
1917	The Devil-Stone
1917	The Little Princess
1917	Joan the Woman
1918	The Squaw Man
1918	The Hidden Pearls
1918	We Can't Have Everything
1918	Old Wives for New
1918	M'Liss
1918	Such a Little Pirate
1918	Arizona
1919	Don't Change Your Husband
1919	The Winning Girl
1919	The Poor Boob
1919	For Better, for Worse
1919	The Woman Thou Gavest Me
1919	Love Insurance
1919	Male and Female
1919	What Every Woman Learns
1919	Everywoman
1920	Suds
1920	Double Speed
1920	Judy of Rogue's Harbor
1920	Something to Think About
1921	Forbidden Fruit
1921	Sham
1921	The Affairs of Anatol
1921	Miss Lulu Bett
1921	Hail the Woman
1921	You're Fired
1922	Across the Continent
1922	Our Leading Citizen
1922	Saturday Night
1922	Night Life in Hollywood
1923	Grumpy
1923	The Ten Commandments
1925	Locked Doors
1929	Noisy Neighbors
