= Ernest Joy =

American actor

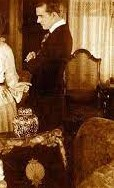
- Born: January 20, 1878; Mitchell County, Iowa, U.S.
- Died: February 12, 1924 (aged 46); Los Angeles, California, U.S.
- Occupation: Actor
- Years active: 1911–1920
- Spouse(s): Jessie Busley (m.1907–div.1912); Mabel Van Buren (m.1919)

Ernest C. Joy (January 20, 1878 – February 12, 1924) was an American stage and film actor of the silent era. He appeared in 76 films between 1911 and 1920.

== Selected filmography ==
- Article 47, L' (1913)
- Salomy Jane (1914)
- Mignon (1915)
- The Goose Girl (1915)
- After Five (1915)
- The Woman (1915)
- The Wild Goose Chase (1915)
- Chimmie Fadden (1915)
- The Voice in the Fog (1915)
- Chimmie Fadden Out West (1915)
- Temptation (1915)
- The Golden Chance (1915)
- The Heart of Nora Flynn (1916)
- Maria Rosa (1916)
- The Clown (1916)
- The Heir to the Hoorah (1916)
- Joan the Woman (1916)
- The Silent Partner (1917)
- The Inner Shrine (1917)
- Nan of Music Mountain (1917)
- Rimrock Jones (1918)
- The House of Silence (1918)
- Believe Me, Xantippe (1918)
- We Can't Have Everything (1918)
- The Goat (1918)
- The Dancin' Fool (1920)
- A Lady in Love (1920)
- What's Your Hurry? (1920)
- The Notorious Miss Lisle (1920)
