= Wallace Reid filmography =

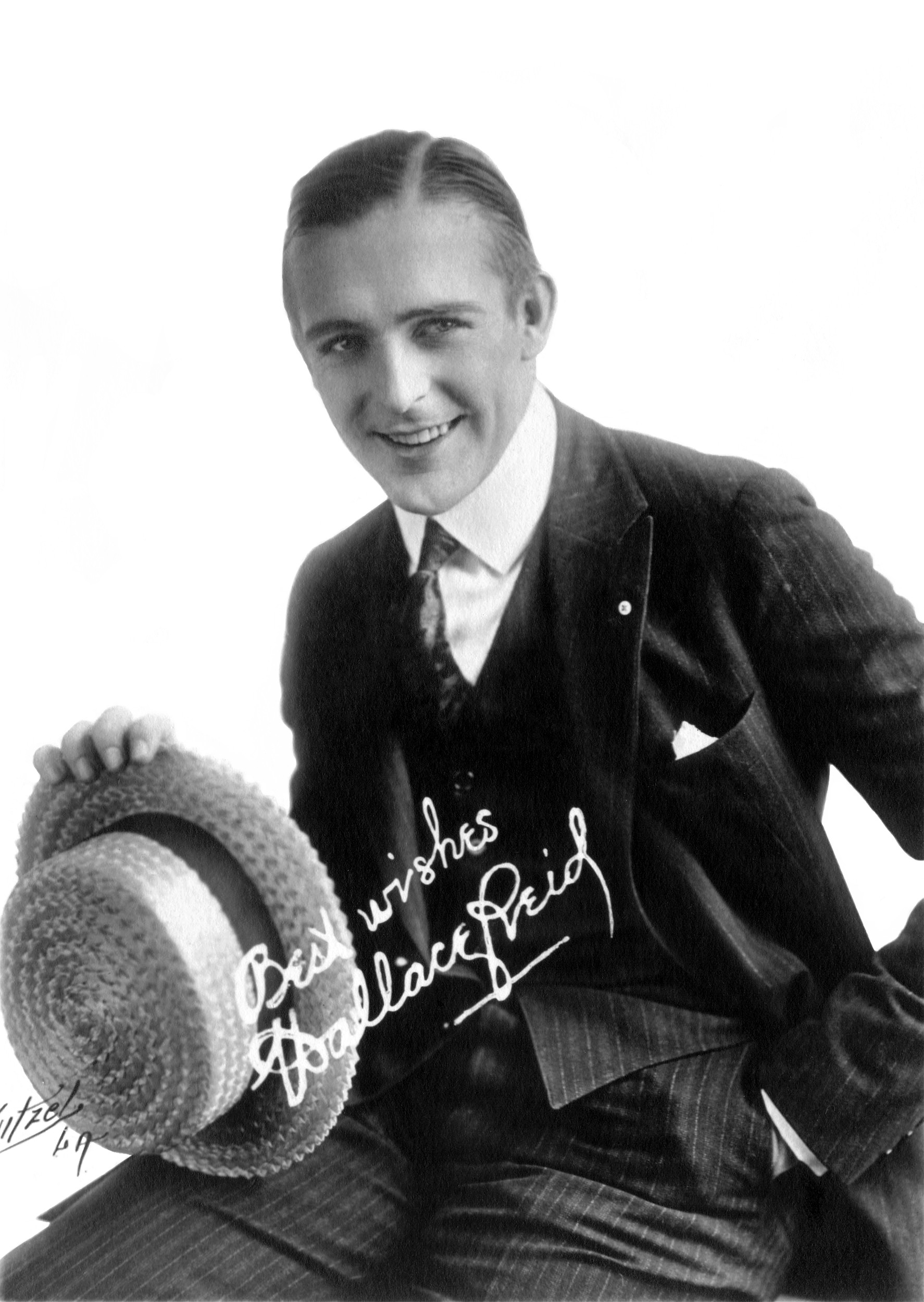
Wallace Reid portrait by Witzel.

This is a comprehensive listing of Wallace Reid's (1891–1923) silent film output. Reid often played a clean-cut, well-groomed American go-getter on screen, which is how he is best remembered, but he could alternate with character roles, especially in his early short films, most of which are now lost. Some films have him as a director, some have him as an actor and some have him as both in particular his numerous short films. His first feature film is the famous appearance as a young blacksmith in The Birth of a Nation in 1915.

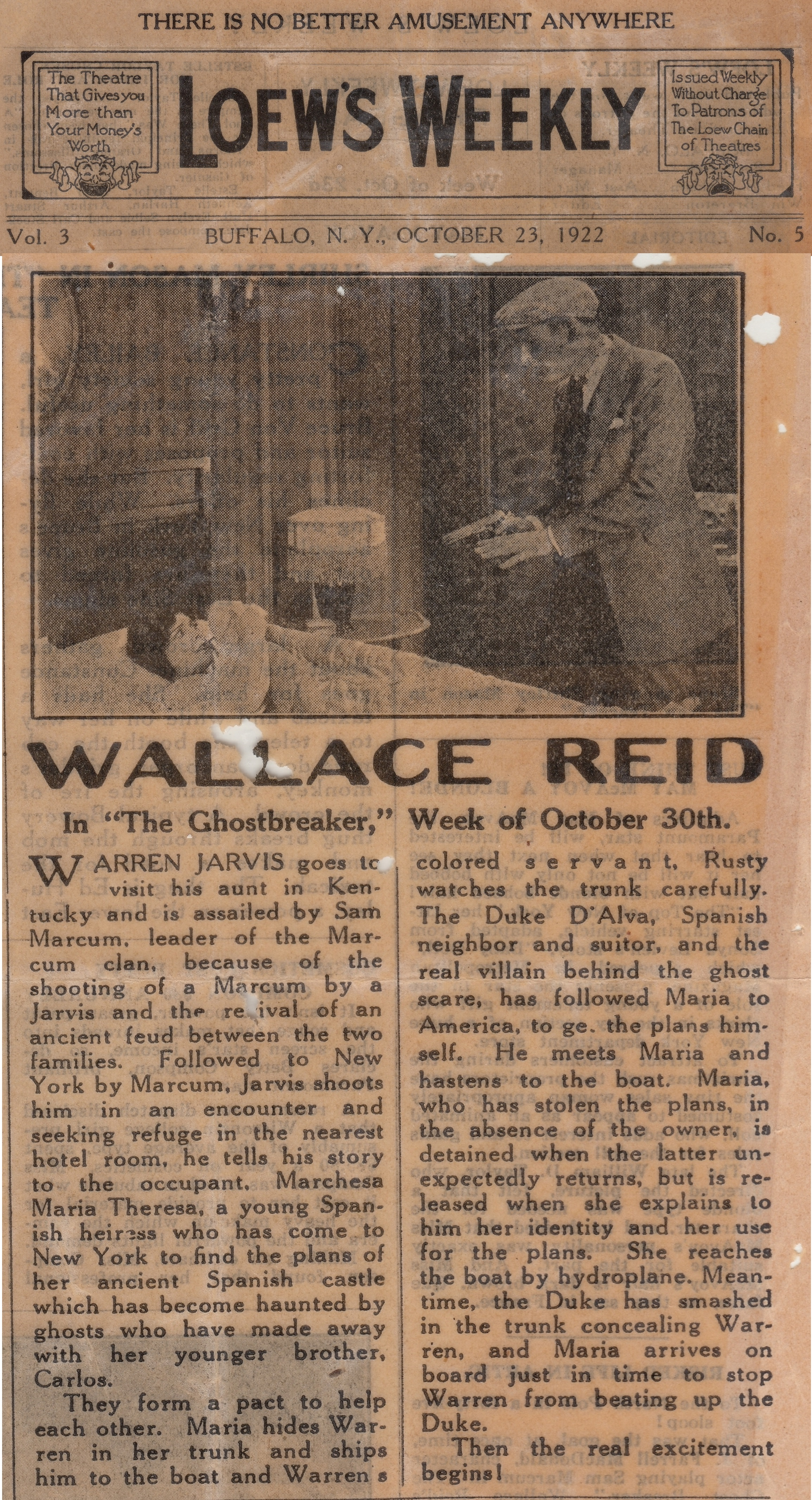
Promotional material for The Ghost Breaker (1922), one of Reid's last films.

== 1910 ==
- The Phoenix (1910) *short ...as Young Reporter

== 1911 ==
- The Leading Lady (1911) *short
- The Reporter (1911) *short ...as Cohn, Jones' Assistant
- The Mother of the Ranch (1911) *short ...as The Mother's Friend back East
- War (1911) *short ...as Midas

== 1912 ==
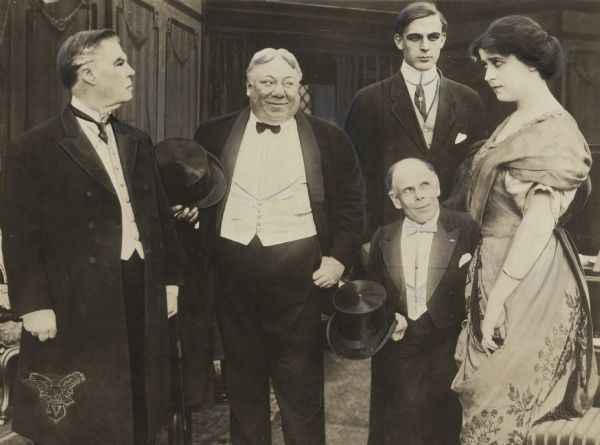
Chumps, a 1912 Vitagraph production (left to right): William Shea, John Bunny, Marshall P. Wilder, Leah Baird. Wallace Reid standing behind Wilder. Reid wrote the scenario for this film.

- A Red Cross Martyr, or, On the Firing Lines of Tripoli (1912) *short
- The Path of True Love (1912) *short ...as The Country Boy
- Chumps (1912) *short ...as George, the Denouement
- Jean Intervenes (1912) *short ...as Billy Hallock
- Indian Romeo and Juliet (1912) *short ...as Oniatore/Romeo
- Playmates (1912) *short ...as Party Guest at Piano(uncredited)
- The Telephone Girl (1912) *short ...as Jack Watson
- The Seventh Son (1912) *short ...as One of the Beecham Brothers
- The Illumination (1912) *short ...as Giuseppe's Father
- At Scrogginses' Corner (1912) *short
- Brothers (1912) *short ...as Minor role
- The Victoria Cross (1912) *short ...as Lt. Cholmodeley
- The Hieroglyphic (1912) *short ...
- Fortunes of a Composer (1912) *short ...as Opera Attendee (uncredited)
- Diamond Cut Diamond (1912) *short ...as The Office Clerk
- Curfew Shall Not Ring Tonight (1912) *short ...as Basil Underwood
- His Mother's Son (1912) *short ...
- Kaintuck (1912) *short ...as The Artist
- Virginius (1912) *short ...as Icilius
- The Gamblers (1912) *short ...as Arthur Ingraham
- Before the White Man Came (1912) *short ...as Wathuma-the Leopard
- A Man's Duty (1912) *short ...as Dick Wilson-Union Soldier
- At Cripple Creek (1912) *short ...as Joe Mayfield
- Making Good (1912) *short ...as Billy Burns
- The Secret Service Man (1912) *short ...as The Secret Service Man
- The Indian Raiders (1912) *short ...as Tom
- His Only Son (1912) *short ...as Bob Madden
- Every Inch a Man (1912) *short ...as Robert Chapman-the Son
- Early Days in the West (1912) *short ...as Dan, a Young Pioneer
- Hunted Down (1912) *short ... as John Dayton
- A Daughter of the Redskins (1912) *short ...as Captain Stark, U.S.A.
- The Cowboy Guardians (1912) *short ...as
- The Tribal Law (1912) *short ...as Tall Pine aka Jose Seville-Apache Brave (*directed)
- An Indian Outcast (1912) *short ...as Wally, a Cowboy
- The Hidden Treasure (1912) *short ...as Bill Binks (*directed)
- The Sepoy Rebellion (1912) *short ...as Extra (uncredited)

== 1913 ==
- Love and the Law (1913)*short ...as Sheriff John Allen (*directed)
- Their Masterpiece (1913)*short ...as Jack Sanders
- Pirate Gold (1913)*short...
- The Rose of Old Mexico (1913)*short ...as Paul Hapgood (*directed)
- The Picture of Dorian Gray (1913)*short ...as Dorian Gray
- Near to Earth (1913)*short ...as
- The Eye of a God (1913)*short ...as Frank Hammond
- The Ways of Fate (1913)*short ... as Jim Conway (*directed)
- When Jim Returned (1913)*short ...as Jim (*directed)
- The Tattooed Arm (1913)*short ...as Ben Hart (*directed)
- The Brothers (1913)*short ...as Robert Gregory (*directed)
- The Deerslayer (1913)*short ...as Chingachgook
- Youth and Jealousy (1913)*short ...as Ben (*directed)
- The Kiss (1913)*short ...as Ralph Walters (*directed)
- Her Innocent Marriage (1913)*short ...as Will Wayne (*directed)
- A Modern Snare (1913)*short ...as Ralph-the New Sheriff (*directed)
- On the Border (1913)*short ...as Bill Reeves-the Cowboy (*directed)
- When Luck Changes (1913)*short ...as Cal Jim (*directed)
- Via Cabaret (1913)*short ...as Harry Reeder (*directed)
- The Spirit of the Flag (1913)*short ...as Dr. Reid
- Hearts and Horses (1913)*short ...as Bill Walters (*directed)
- In Love and War (1913)*short ...as David-the Journalist
- Women and War (1913)*short ...as The Boy
- The Guerilla Menace (1913)*short ...as Captain Bruce Douglas
- Calamity Anne Takes a Trip (1913)*short ...Policeman
- Song Bird of the North (1913)*short ...as Fowle-a Mission Worker
- Pride of Lonesome (1913)*short ...as Edward Daton (*directed)
- The Powder Flash of Death (1913)*short ...as Captain Bruce Douglas
- A Foreign Spy (1913)*short ... (*directed)
- The Picket Guard (1913)*short ...as Sentry
- Mental Suicide (1913)*short ...as Reid-a Contractor
- Man's Duty (1913)*short ...Bill, the Selfish One
- An Even Exchange (1913)*short ...as Joe
- The Animal (1913)*short ...as The Animal
- The Harvest of Flame (1913)*short ...as The Inspector (*directed)
- The Spark of Manhood (1913)*short ... (*directed)
- The Mystery of Yellow Aster Mine (1913)*short ...as Reid-Rosson's Brother
- The Gratitude of Wanda (1913)*short ...as Wally (*directed)
- The Wall of Money (1913)*short ...as Wallace-McQuarrie's Son
- The Heart of a Cracksman (1913)*short ...as Gentleman Crook (*directed)
- The Crackman's Reformation (1913)*short ...as Gentleman Crook
- The Fires of Fate (1913)*short ...as Wally-the Doctor (*directed)
- Cross Purposes (1913)*short ...as Wally (*directed)
- Retribution (1913)*short ...as Reid (*directed)
- A Cracksman Santa Claus (1913)*short ...as Gentleman Crook
- The Lightning Bolt (1913)*short ...as Reid (*directed)
- A Hopi Legend (1913)*short ... (*directed)

== 1914 ==
- Whoso Diggeth a Pit (1914)*short ...as Wally
- The Intruder (1914 film)*short ...as The Woodsman (*directed)
- The Countess Betty's Mine (1914)*short ...as Wallace (*directed)
- The Wheel of Life (1914)*short ...as The Prospector (*directed)
- Fires of Conscience (1914)*short ...as Ray-The Prospector (*directed)
- The Greater Devotion (1914)*short ...as 'Devotion' (*directed)
- A Flash in the Dark (1914)*short ...as A Miner (*directed)
- Breed o' the Mountains (1914)*short ...as Joe Mayfield (*directed)
- Regeneration (1914)*short ... The Artist (*directed)
- The Voice of the Viola (1914)*short ...as Wallace (*directed)
- The Heart of the Hills (1914)*short ... The Woodsman (*directed)
- The Way of a Woman (1914)*short ...as Pierre (*directed)
- The Mountaineer (1914)*short ...as Jim-the Mountaineer (*directed)
- The Spider and Her Web (1914)*short ...

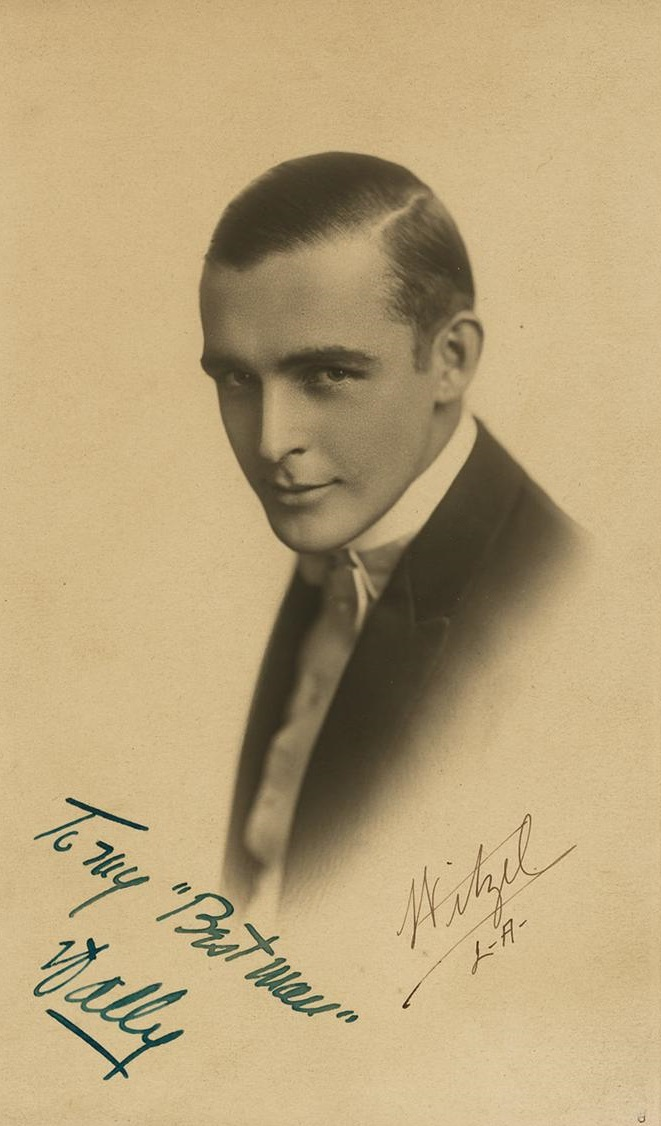
Wallace Reid circa 1914, by Albert Witzel

- Cupid Incognito (1914)*short ...as Jack Falkner (*directed)
- A Gypsy Romance (1914)*short ...as Jose-King of the Gypsies (*directed)
- The Test (1914)*short ...as The Poor Man (*directed, actor) Lost
- The Skeleton (1914)*short ...as Jack-the Young Husband (*directed)
- The Fruit of Evil (1914)*short ... (*directed)
- The Daughter of a Crook (1914)*short ...as Neal
- Women and Roses (1914)*short ...as Wallace (*directed)
- The Quack (1914)*short ...as Wallace Rosslyn (*directed)
- The Siren (1914)*short ...as Dane Northrop (*directed)
- The Man Within (1914)*short ...as Wallace Rosslyn (*directed)
- Passing of the Beast (1914)*short ...as Jacques-the Woodsman (*directed)
- Love's Western Flight (1914)*short ...as Wally-the Ranch Owner (*directed)
- A Wife on a Wager (1914)*short ...as Wally Bristow (*directed)
- 'Cross the Mexican Line (1914)*short ... as Lt. Wallace (*directed)
- The Den of Thieves (1914)*short ...as Wallace (*directed)
- Arms and the Gringo (1914)*short ...as Sullivan
- The City Beautiful (1914)*short ...as The Country Boy
- Down by the Sounding Sea (1914)*short ...as John Ward-the Man from the Sea
- The Avenging Conscience (1914)*short ...as The Doctor(uncredited)
- Moonshine Molly (1914)*short ...as Lawson Keene
- The Second Mrs. Roebuck (1914)*short ...as Samuel Roebuck
- Sierra Jim's Reformation (1914)*short ...as Tim-the Pony Express Rider
- The High Grader (1914)*short ...as Dick Raleigh
- Down the Hill to Creditville (1914)*short ...as Marcus Down
- Her Awakening (1914)*short ...as Bob Turner
- Her Doggy (1914)*short ...as The Doctor
- For Her Father's Sins (1914)*short ...as Frank Bell
- A Mother's Influence (1914)*short ... as Wallace Burton-the Son
- Sheriff for an Hour (1914)*short ...as Jim Jones
- The Niggard (1914)*short ...as Elmer Kent
- The Odalisque (1914)*short ...as Curtiss
- The Little Country Mouse (1914)*short ...as Lieutenant Hawkhurst
- Another Chance (1914)*short ...Detective Flynn
- Over the Ledge (1914)*short ...as Bob
- At Dawn (1914)*short ...as The Lieutenant
- The Joke on Yellentown (1914)*short ...as
- The Exposure (1914)*short ...as The Reporter
- Baby's Ride (1914)*short ...as Father

== 1915 ==
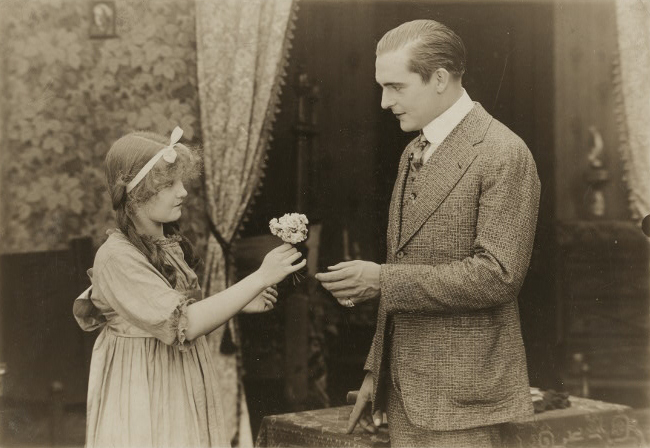
Dorothy Gish and Wallace Reid in Old Heidelberg.

- The Three Brothers (1915)*short ...as Jean Gaudet/Will
- The Craven (1915)*short ...as Bud Walton
- The Birth of a Nation ...as Jeff, the blacksmith
- The Lost House (1915)*short ...as Ford
- Enoch Arden (1915)*short ...as Phillip Ray
- Station Content (1915)*short ...as Jim Manning
- A Yankee from the West (1915) ...as Billy Milford aka Hell-in-the Mud
- The Chorus Lady (1915) ...as Danny Mallory
- Carmen (1915) ...as Don José
- Old Heidelberg (1915) ...as Prince Karl Heinrich
- The Golden Chance (1915) ...as Roger Manning

== 1916 ==
- To Have and to Hold (1916) ...as Captain Ralph Percy
- The Love Mask (1916) ...as Dan Derring

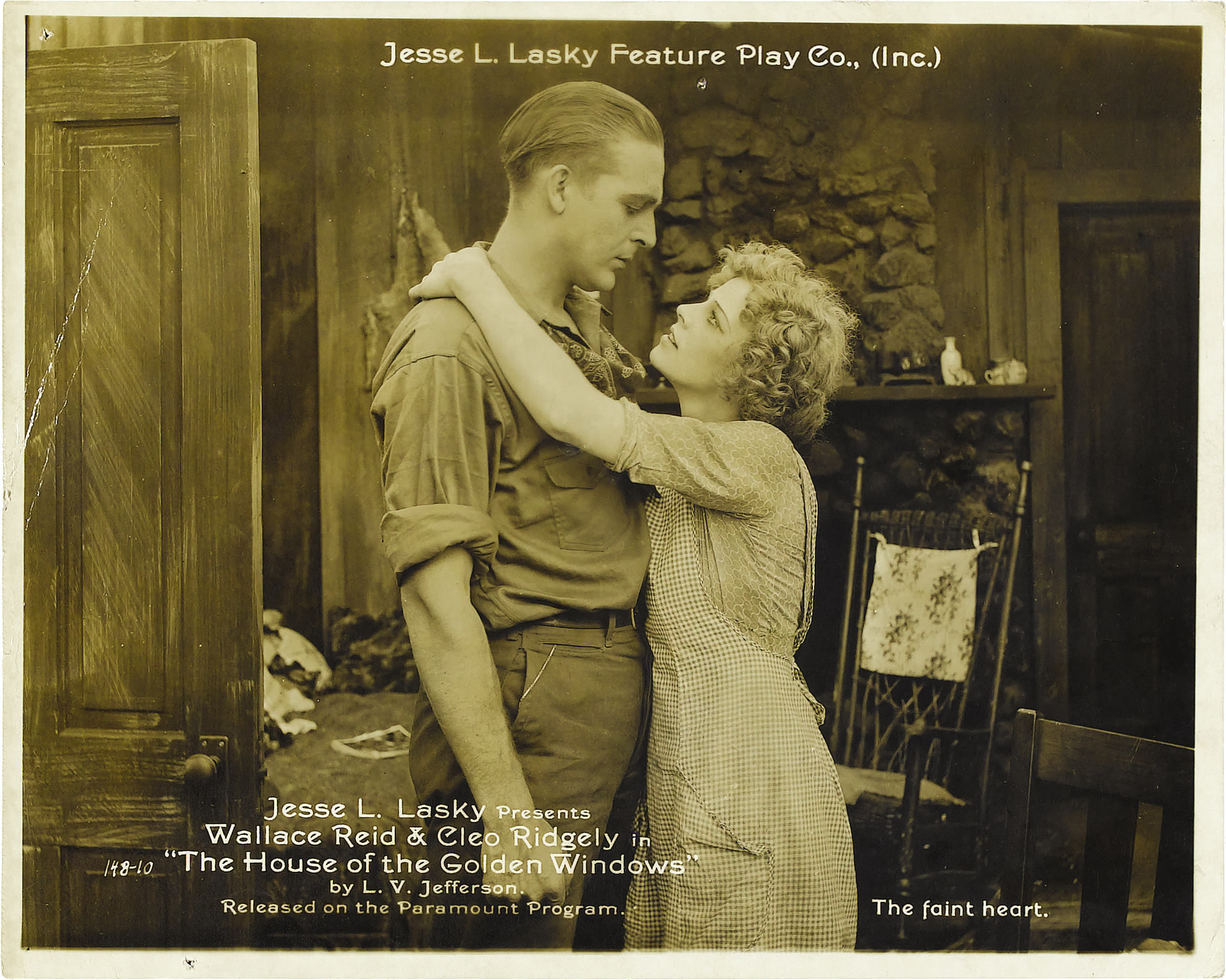
Wally Reid and Cleo Ridgely The House of the Golden Windows.

- Maria Rosa (1916) ...as Andreas
- The Selfish Woman (1916) ...as Tom Morley
- The House with the Golden Windows (1916) ...as Tom Wells
- Intolerance (1916) ...as young man killed in battle (uncredited)
- The Yellow Pawn (1916) ...as James Weldon
- The Wall of Flame (1916)*short ...Wallace-the Fire Inspector
- The Wrong Heart (1916)*short ... (*directed)

== 1917 ==
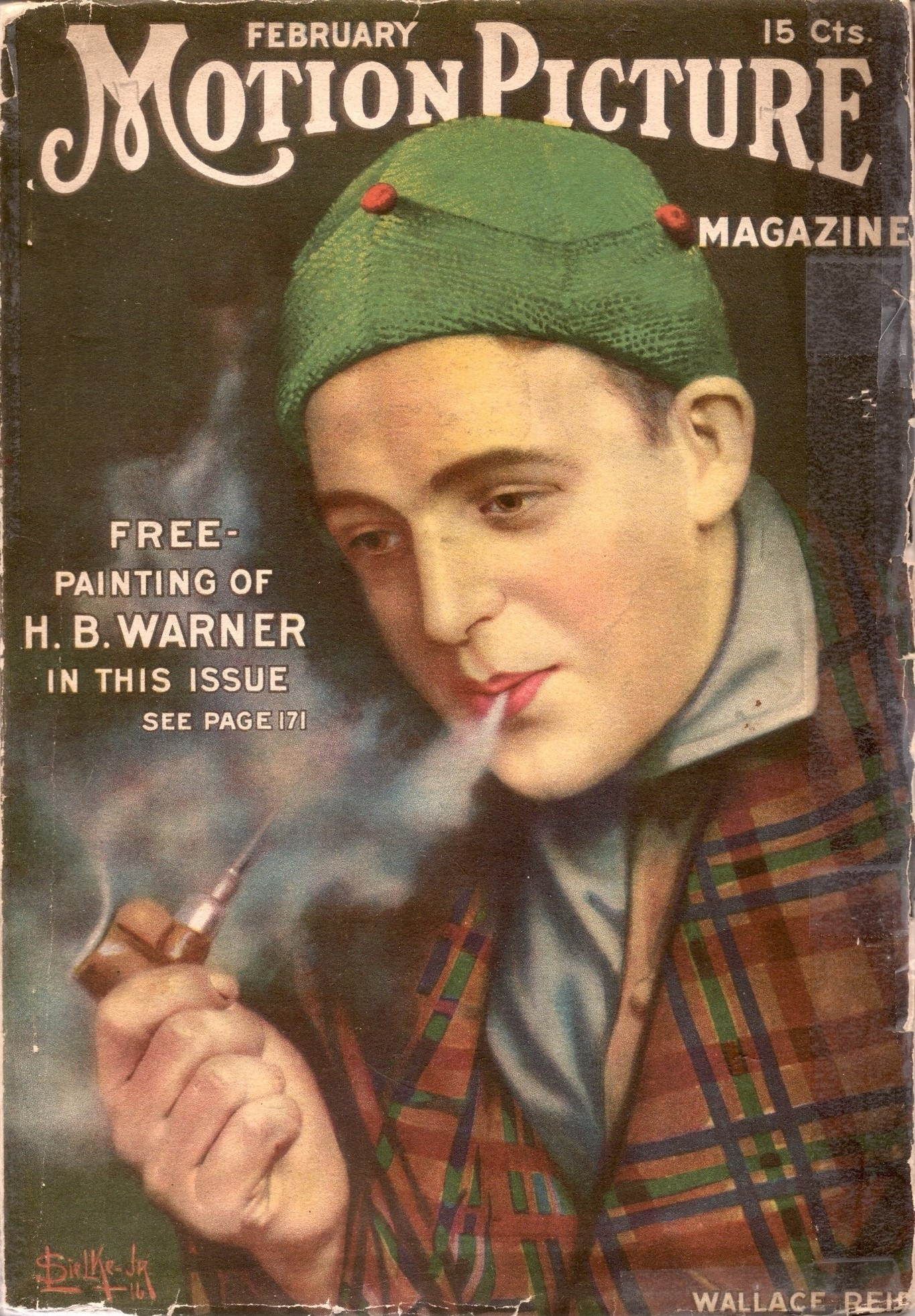
Motion Picture Magazine February 1917.

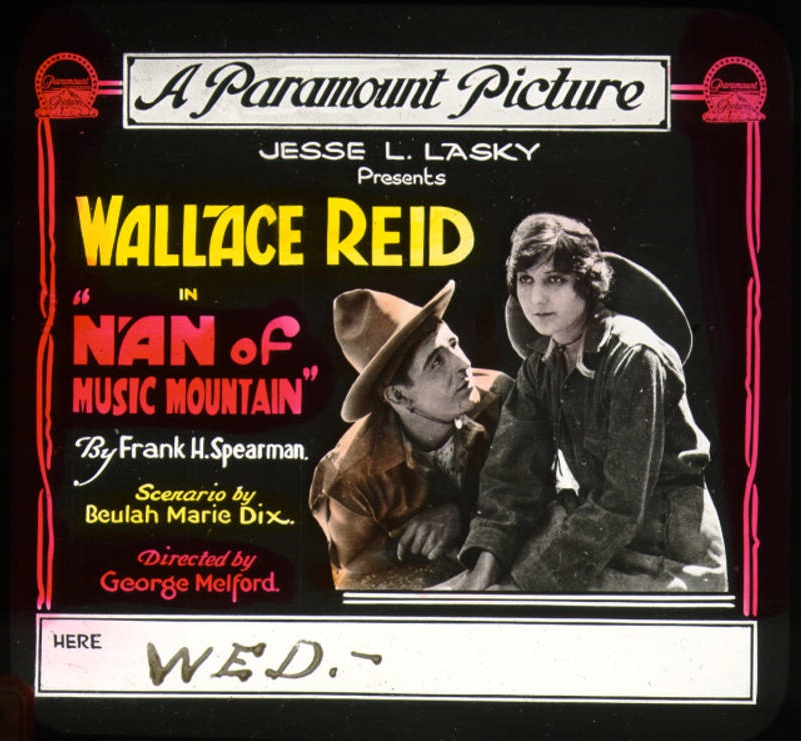
slide for Nan of Music Mountain.

- Joan the Woman (1917) ...as Eric Trent 1431/Eric Trent 1917
- The Golden Fetter (1917) ...as James Roger Ralston
- The Man Who Saved the Day (1917)*short ...John King (*directed) Lost
- Buried Alive (1917)*short (*directed) Lost
- The Tell-Tale Arm (1917)*short Lost
- The Prison Without Walls (1917) ...as Huntington Babbs Lost
- A Warrior's Bride (1917)*short (*directed) Lost
- The Penalty of Silence (1917)*short (*directed) Lost
- The World Apart (1917) ...as Bob Fulton Lost
- Big Timber (1917) ...as Jack Fife Lost
- The Squaw Man's Son (1917) ...as Lord Effington, aka Hal Lost
- The Hostage (1917) ...as Lieutenant Kemper Lost
- The Woman God Forgot (1917) ...as Alvarado
- Nan of Music Mountain (1917) ...as Henry de Spain Lost
- The Devil-Stone (1917) ...as Guy Sterling

== 1918 ==
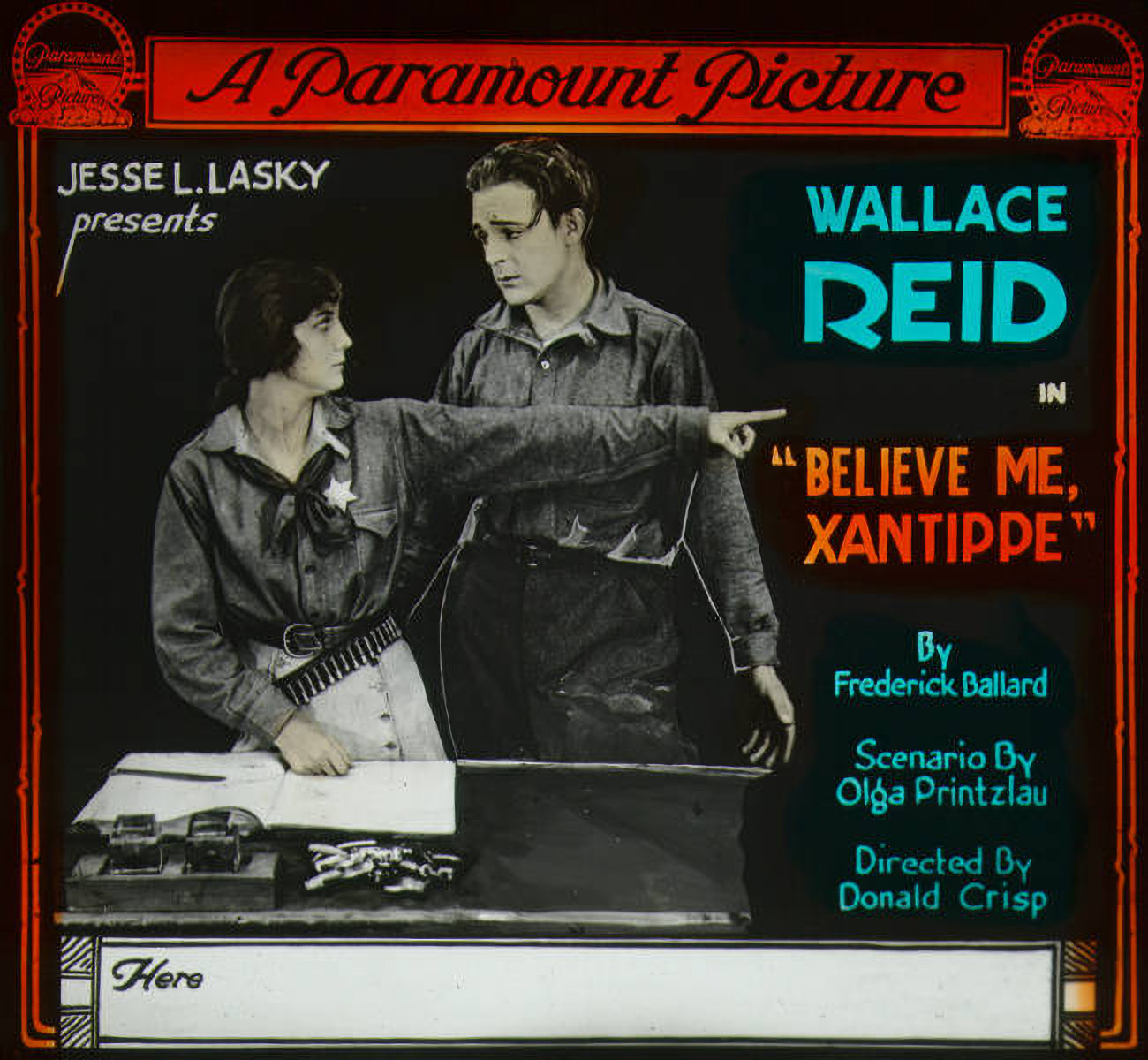
lantern slide Believe Me, Xantippe (1918).

- Rimrock Jones (1918) ...as Rimrock Jones Lost
- The Thing We Love (1918) ...as Rodney Sheridan Lost
- The House of Silence (1918) ...as Marcel Levington Lost
- Believe Me, Xantippe (1918) ...as George MacFarland Lost
- The Firefly of France (1918) ...as Devereux Bayne Lost
- Less Than Kin (1918) ...as Hobart Lee/Lewis Vickers Lost
- The Source (1918) ...as Van Twiller Yard Lost
- His Extra Bit (1918)*short ... Lost
- The Man from Funeral Range (1918) ...as Harry Webb Lost
- Too Many Millions (1918) ... as Walsingham Van Doren Lost

== 1919 ==
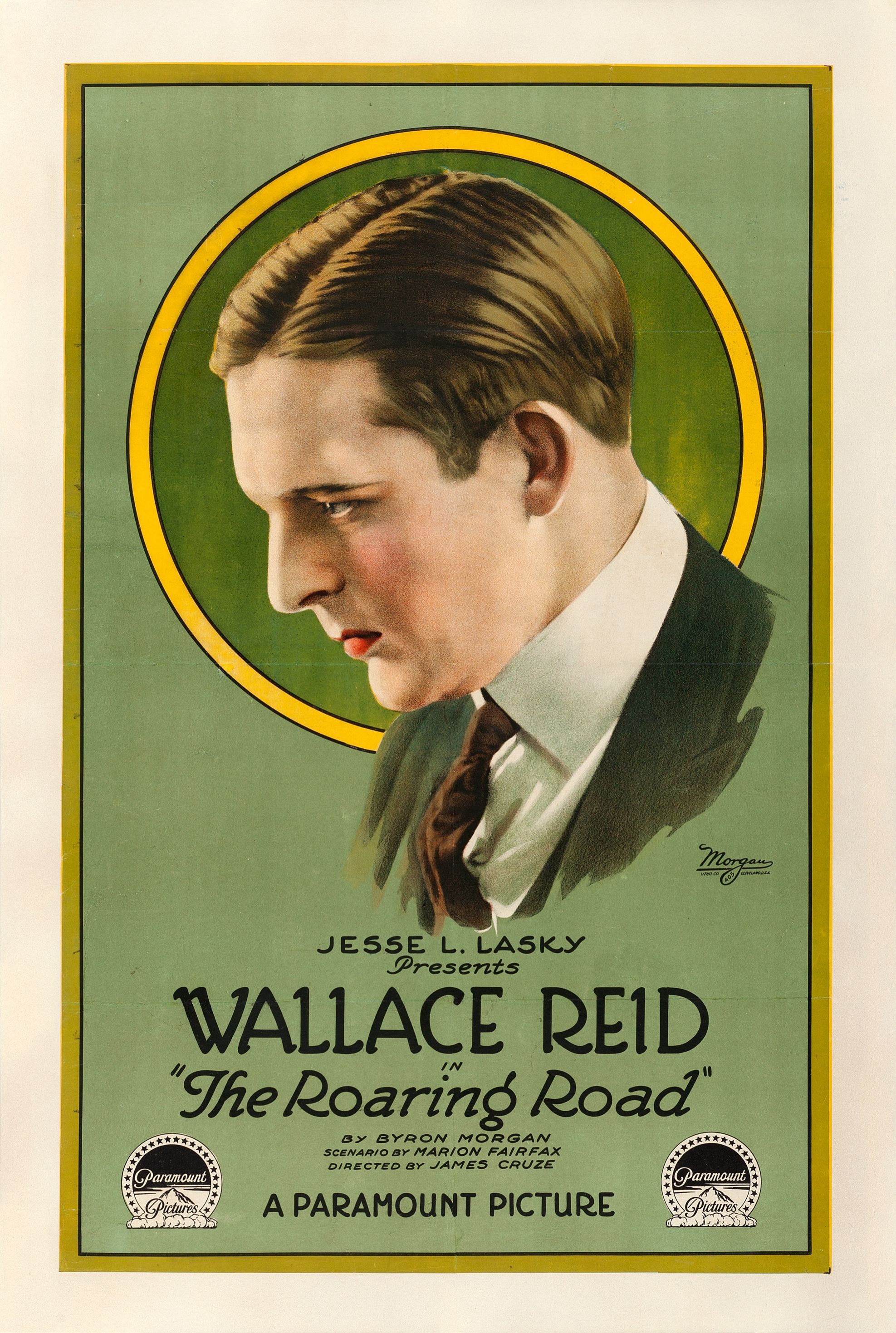
poster for The Roaring Road.

- The Dub (1919) ...as John Craig (The 'Dub') Lost
- Alias Mike Moran (1919) ...as Larry Young Lost
- The Roaring Road (1919) ...as Walter Thomas 'Toodles' Walden
- You're Fired (1919) ...as Billy Deering
- The Love Burglar (1919) ...as David Strong Lost
- The Valley of the Giants (1919) ...as Bryce Cardigan
- The Lottery Man (1919) ...as Jack Wright Lost
- Hawthorne of the U.S.A. (1919) ...as Anthony Hamilton Hawthorne

== 1920 ==
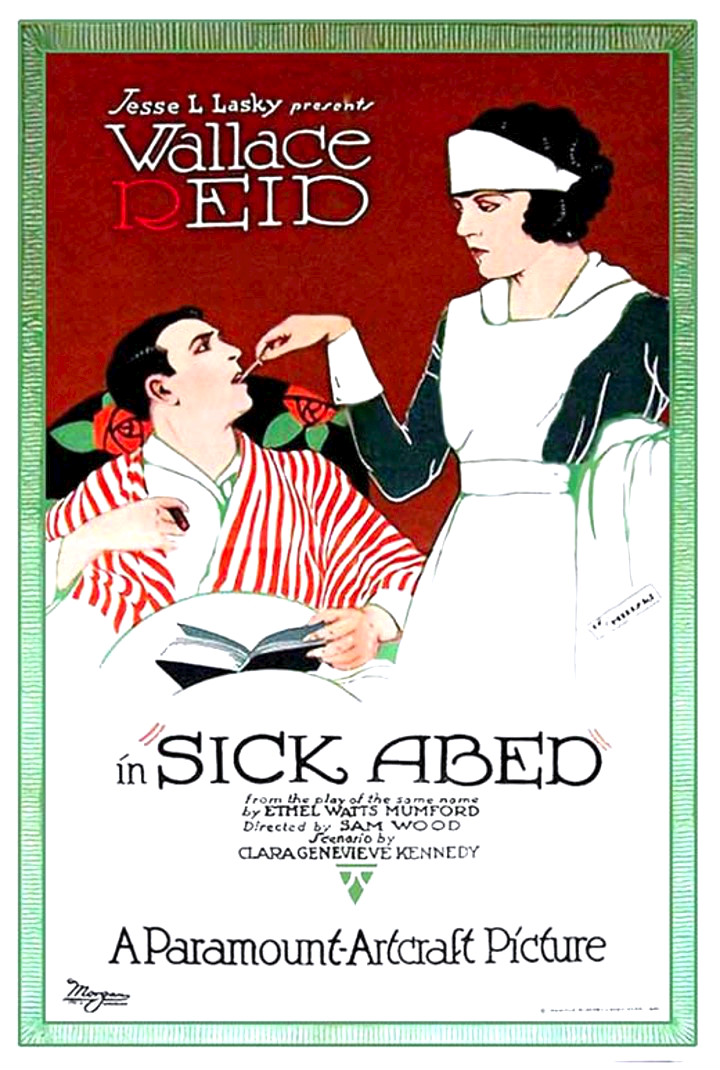
poster for Sick Abed.

- Double Speed (1920) ...as 'Speed' Carr Lost
- Excuse My Dust (1920) ... as 'Toodles' Walden
- The Dancin' Fool (1920) ...as Sylvester Tibble
- Sick Abed (1920) ...as Reginald Jay
- What's Your Hurry? (1920) ...as Dusty Rhoades
- Always Audacious (1920) ...as Perry Dayton/'Slim' Attucks Lost

== 1921 ==
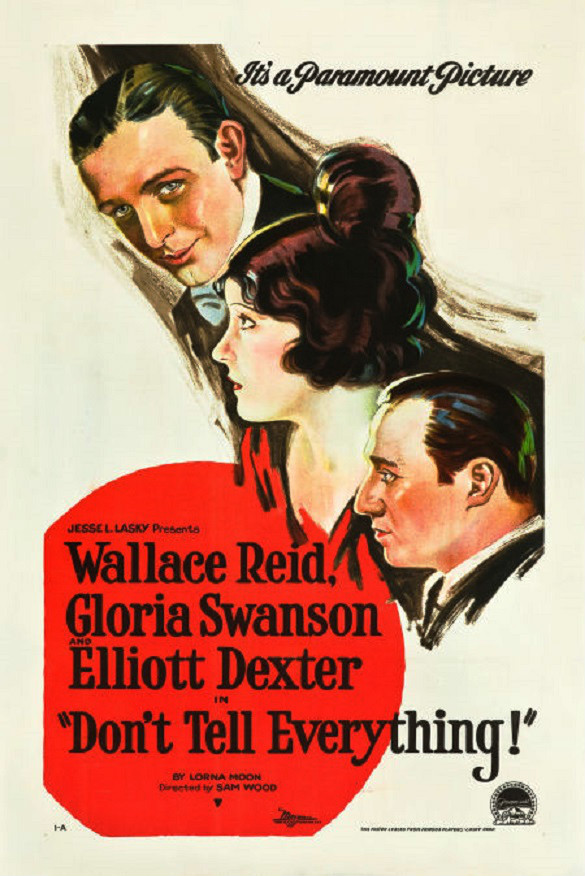
Don't Tell Everything (1921) poster

- The Charm School (1921) ... as Austin Bevans Lost
- The Love Special (1921) ...Jim Glover
- Too Much Speed (1921) ...as 'Dusty' Rhoades Lost
- The Hell Diggers (1921) ...as Teddy Darman Lost
- The Affairs of Anatol (1921) ...as Anatol Spencer
- Forever (1921) ...as Peter Ibbetson Lost
- Don't Tell Everything (1921) ...as Cullen Dale Lost

== 1922 ==
- Rent Free (1922) ...as Buell Arnister Jr Lost
- The World's Champion (1922) ...as William Burroughs
- Across the Continent (1922) ...as Jimmy Dent Lost
- The Dictator (1922) ...as Brooke Travers Lost
- A Trip to Paramountown (1922)*short ...cameo;as himself
- Nice People (1922) ...as Captain Billy Wade Lost
- The Ghost Breaker (1922) ...as Walter Jarvis, a Ghost Breaker Lost
- Clarence (1922) ...as Clarence Smith Lost
- Thirty Days (1922) ...as John Floyd Lost
- Night Life in Hollywood (1922) ...cameo;as himself Lost
- Hollywood (1923) ...cameo;as himself (posthumous release) Lost

== Director ==
Films for which Wallace Reid directs but does not appear in:

- Where Destiny Guides (1913)*short
- The Latent Spark (1913)*short
- The Fugitive (1913)*short
- When the Light Fades (1913)*short
- Brother Love (1913)*short
- The Orphan's Mine (1913)*short
- The Renegade's Heart (1913)*short
- The Mute Witness (1913)*short
- The Homestead Race (1913)*short
- Suspended Sentence (1913)*short
- Dead Man's Shoes (1913)*short
