= The Roaring Road (1919 film) =

1919 film by James Cruze, Frank John Urson

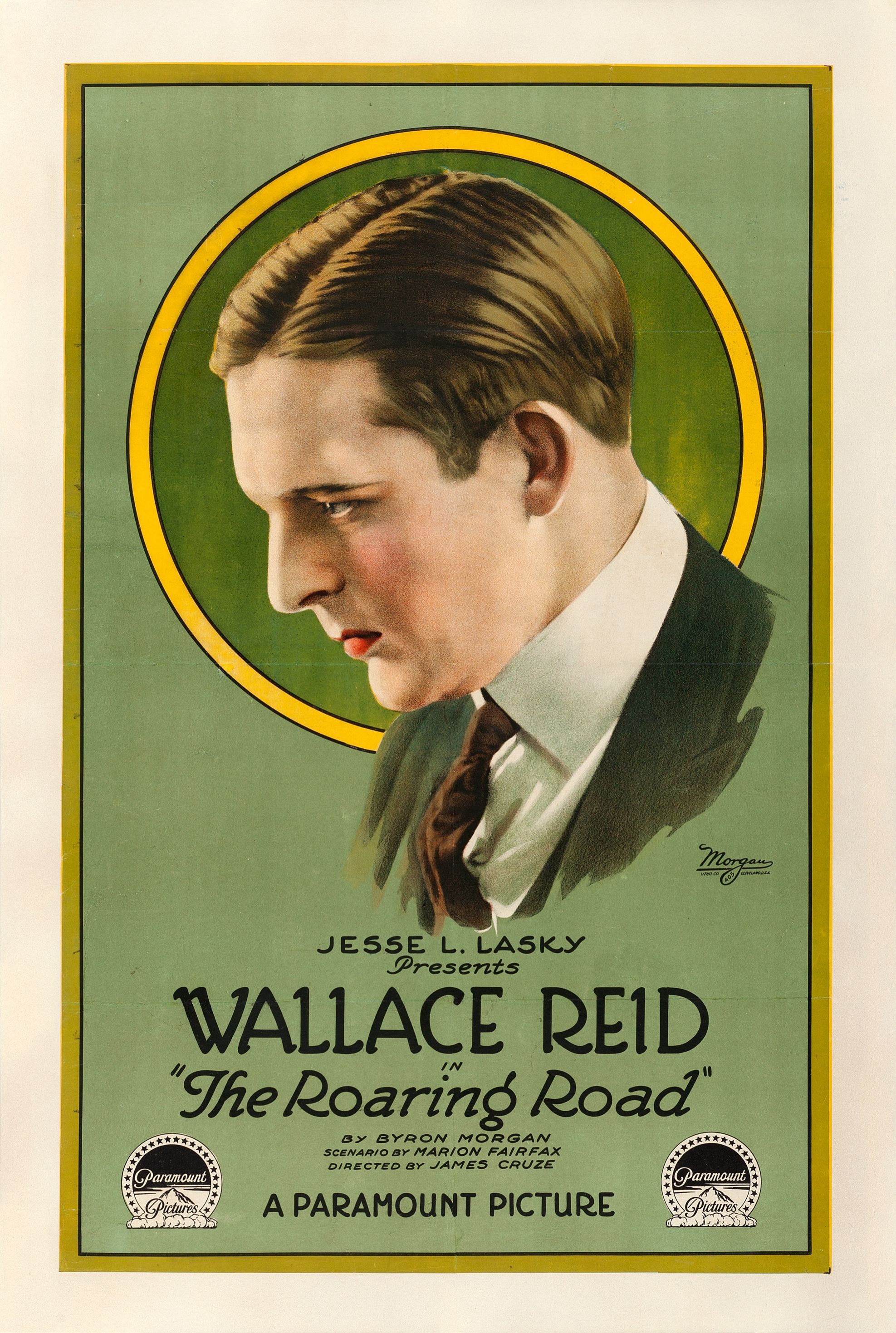
- Theatrical release poster
- Directed by: James Cruze; Frank Urson (racing sequence); James Barranger (asst. director)
- Written by: Marion Fairfax
- Based on: short stories by Byron Morgan
- Produced by: Adolph Zukor; Jesse L. Lasky
- Starring: Wallace Reid
- Cinematography: Frank Urson
- Production company: Famous Players–Lasky
- Distributed by: Paramount Pictures
- Release date: April 27, 1919
- Running time: 5 reels (4,309 feet)
- Country: United States
- Language: Silent (English intertitles)

The Roaring Road is a 1919 American silent action romance film produced by Famous Players–Lasky and distributed by Paramount Pictures. It is taken from the short stories by Byron Morgan; Junkpile Sweepstakes, Undertaker's Handicap, and Roaring Road.

This film was so successful that it spawned a sequel, Excuse My Dust, from stories by the same author. This film is available on video and DVD from online sources.

== Plot ==
As described in a film magazine, "Toodles" Walden, an automobile salesman who works for a sporty old automobile distributor J. D. Ward, has racing ambitions and is in love with Ward's daughter Dorothy. The old man does not propose to give her up for five years and overreaches in an attempt to stimulate the young man with feigned complaints. They part company, but Ward is in despair when three racing machines are damaged in a train wreck.

Toodles buys the wreckage and assembles one complete car with the aid of his mechanic. With this car Toodles wins an important race, then holds up Ward for an increase in pay. There are just a few days left for a record to be broken between Los Angeles and San Francisco, and after Toodles is arrested for speeding, Ward has him released as part of his plot to break this record. Ward kidnaps his own daughter, and Toodles comes to the rescue and breaks the record, and also wins Dorothy.

== Cast ==
- Wallace Reid as Walter Thomas "Toodles" Waldron
- Ann Little as Dorothy Ward, the cub
- Theodore Roberts as J. D. Ward, the bear
- Guy Oliver as Tom Darby
- Clarence Geldart as Fred Wheeler

Larry Steers and Teddy Tetzlaff appear uncredited.

== See also ==
- The House That Shadows Built (1931 promotional film by Paramount)
- Wallace Reid filmography
