= The Love Special =

1921 film

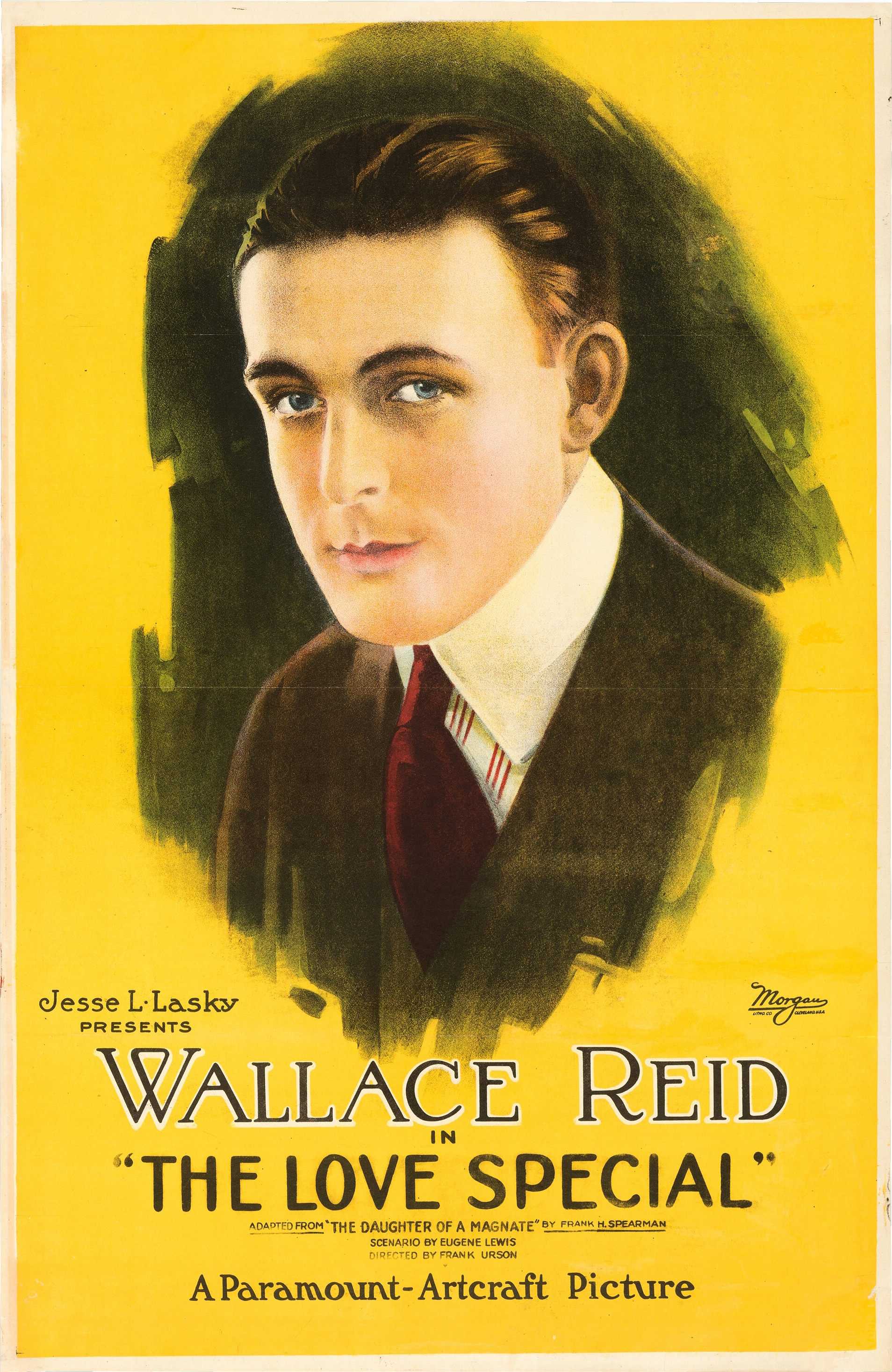
- Theatrical release poster
- Directed by: Frank Urson
- Screenplay by: Eugene B. Lewis; Frank H. Spearman
- Produced by: Jesse L. Lasky
- Starring: Wallace Reid; Agnes Ayres; Theodore Roberts; Lloyd Whitlock; Sylvia Ashton; William Gaden
- Cinematography: Charles Edgar Schoenbaum
- Production company: Famous Players–Lasky Corporation
- Distributed by: Paramount Pictures
- Release date: March 20, 1921
- Running time: 50 minutes
- Country: United States
- Language: Silent (English intertitles)

The Love Special is a 1921 American silent drama film directed by Frank Urson and written by Eugene B. Lewis and Frank H. Spearman. The film stars Wallace Reid, Agnes Ayres, Theodore Roberts, Lloyd Whitlock, Sylvia Ashton, and William Gaden. The film was released on March 20, 1921, by Paramount Pictures.

== Cast ==
- Wallace Reid as Jim Glover
- Agnes Ayres as Laura Gage
- Theodore Roberts as President Gage
- Lloyd Whitlock as Allen Harrison
- Sylvia Ashton as Mrs. Whitney
- William Gaden as William Bucks
- Clarence Burton as Morris Blood
- Snitz Edwards as Zeka Logan
- Ernest Butterworth as 'Gloomy'
- Zelma Maja as Stenographer

== Preservation status ==
A print is preserved at the Library of Congress and UCLA Film & Television Archive.

== See also ==
- Wallace Reid filmography
