= Don't Tell Everything =

1921 film

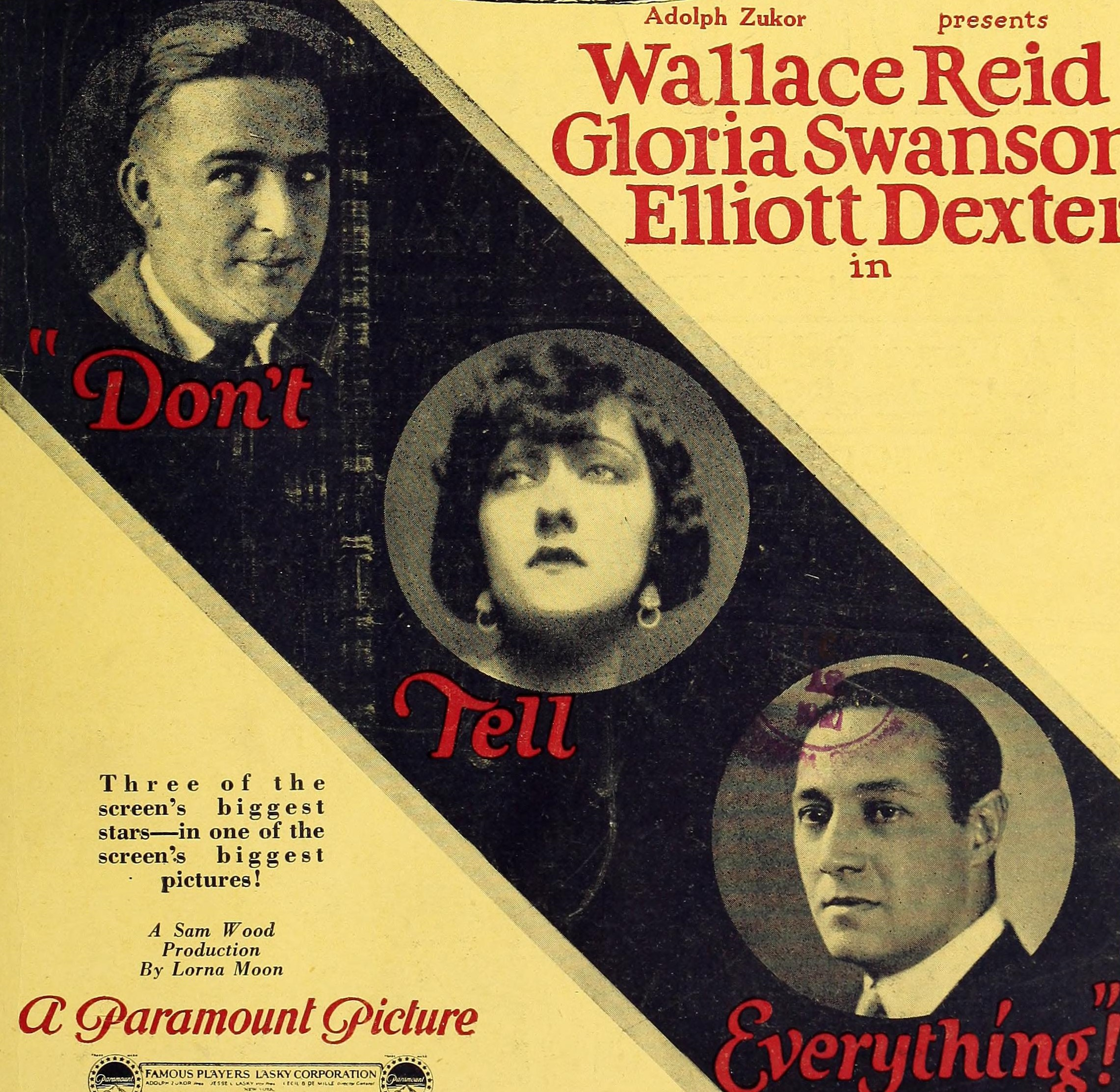
- Film advertisement
- Directed by: Sam Wood
- Written by: Albert S. Le Vino; Lorna Moon
- Produced by: Jesse L. Lasky
- Starring: Gloria Swanson; Wallace Reid; Dorothy Cumming; Elliott Dexter
- Cinematography: Alfred Gilks
- Production company: Famous Players–Lasky
- Distributed by: Paramount Pictures
- Release date: November 13, 1921
- Running time: 50 minutes
- Country: United States
- Language: Silent (English intertitles)

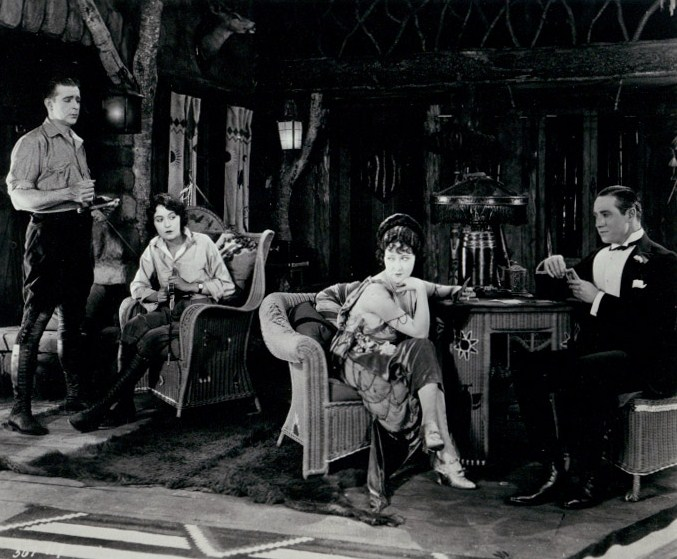
From left to right: Wallace Reid, Dorothy Cumming, Gloria Swanson, and Elliott Dexter

Don't Tell Everything is a 1921 American silent drama film directed by Sam Wood and starring Gloria Swanson and Wallace Reid. Wood apparently created this film in part from outtakes left over from Cecil B. DeMille's The Affairs of Anatol (1921). It is not known whether the film currently survives.

== Plot ==
As described in a film magazine, Cullen Dale becomes engaged to Marian Westover, and when explaining various photographs showing him intimately juxtaposed between divers young women, spreads a network of falsehoods which promise to involve him in subsequent difficulty. One photograph shows him with Jessica Ramsey, a sportswoman who calls her men friends "pals." Learning of Cullen's engagement, she courts his company so consistently that the piqued Marian precipitates a secret marriage. The honeymoon is interrupted by a quarrel which terminates with Cullen's departure for Jessica's hunting lodge. Here Jessica's love-making becomes obvious and the arrival of wife Marian and their mutual friend Harvey Gilroy finds Cullen ready to patch up their differences. After a suitable delay, Marian allows him to do so, with a happy ending ensuing.

== Cast ==
- Wallace Reid as Cullen Dale
- Gloria Swanson as Marian Westover
- Elliott Dexter as Harvey Gilroy
- Dorothy Cumming as Jessica Ramsey
- Genevieve Blinn as Mrs. Morgan
- Baby Gloria Wood as Cullen's niece
- De Briac Twins as Morgan Twin
- De Briac Twins as Morgan Twin

== See also ==
- List of lost films
- Wallace Reid filmography
