= Excuse My Dust =

Excuse My Dust may refer to:

- Excuse My Dust (1920 film)
- Excuse My Dust, 1943 book by Bellamy Partridge, McGraw-Hill Book Company. Anecdotes concerning the advent of the horseless carriage.
- Excuse My Dust (1951 film)
