= What's Your Hurry? =

1920 film by Sam Wood

- Ad for film
- Directed by: Sam Wood
- Written by: Byron Morgan (scenario)
- Based on: The Hippoptamus Parade by Byron Morgan
- Produced by: Adolph Zukor; Jesse L. Lasky
- Starring: Wallace Reid; Lois Wilson
- Cinematography: Alfred Gilks
- Production company: Famous Players–Lasky
- Distributed by: Paramount Pictures
- Release date: August 15, 1920
- Running time: 5 reels; 5,040 feet
- Country: United States
- Language: Silent (English intertitles)

What's Your Hurry? is a 1920 American silent drama film produced by Famous Players–Lasky and distributed by Paramount Pictures. It was directed by Sam Wood and stars Wallace Reid and Lois Wilson.

== Plot ==
As described in a film magazine, to win the favor of his sweetheart's father "Old Pat" MacMurran, race car driver Dusty Rhoades forsakes the speedway in determination to put over effective publicity for the father's product, Pakro motor trucks. A prospective order from Cabrillo Irrigation Company is an incentive to his effort. MacMurran fumbles his publicity plan to bring a giant Christmas tree down from the mountains for the children of Los Angeles on a Pakro truck and goes soberly to the Cabrillo Valley to spend the holiday. Inability to get supplies to builders of the valley dam over the storm-driven roads threatens the lives and homes of valley residents. The day is saved by a truck driven by Dusty carrying the necessary supplies. There is a certainty of a wife for Dusty in Virginia MacMurran and a job at Pakro as the film ends.

== Cast ==
- Wallace Reid as Dusty Rhoades
- Lois Wilson as Virginia MacMurran
- Charles Ogle as Patrick MacMurran
- Clarence Burton as Brenton Harding
- Ernest Butterworth as The Office Boy

unbilled

- Ernest Joy
- Jack Young

== Preservation ==
A copy of What's Your Hurry? is maintained at Gosfilmofond in Moscow.

== See also ==
- Wallace Reid filmography
