= The Firefly of France =

- Lobby card
- Directed by: Donald Crisp
- Screenplay by: Margaret Turnbull
- Based on: The Firefly of France by Marion Polk Angelotti
- Produced by: Jesse L. Lasky
- Starring: Wallace Reid; Ann Little; Charles Ogle; Raymond Hatton; Winter Hall; Ernest Joy
- Cinematography: Henry Kotani
- Production company: Jesse L. Lasky Feature Play Company
- Distributed by: Paramount Pictures
- Release date: July 7, 1918
- Running time: 50 minutes
- Country: United States
- Language: Silent (English intertitles)

The Firefly of France is a lost 1918 American silent drama film directed by Donald Crisp and written by Margaret Turnbull based upon a novelette by Marion Polk Angelotti. The film stars Wallace Reid, Ann Little, Charles Ogle, Raymond Hatton, Winter Hall, and Ernest Joy. The film was released on July 7, 1918, by Paramount Pictures.

== Plot ==
As described in a film magazine, while the actions of Esme Falconer are suspicious, Devereux Bayne's admiration for her forces him to believe in her. When her chauffeur is mysteriously killed, he drives her to a deserted chateau to protect her from French officers. But the officers get there first, and upon their arrival Devereux and Esme are made prisoners. Escaping through a secret door they come upon Jean, known as the Firefly, who has important papers for France. The French officers turn out to be German officers in disguise and they demand the papers. Devereux gives them a false copy of the papers and manages to turn them over to the proper authorities. He wins the heart of Esme and a French Cross of Honor for his bravery.

== Cast ==
- Wallace Reid as Devereux Bayne
- Ann Little as Esme Falconer
- Charles Ogle as Von Blenheim
- Raymond Hatton as The Firefly
- Winter Hall as Dunham
- Ernest Joy as Aide to Von Blenheim
- William Elmer as Aide to Von Blenheim
- Clarence Geldart as Aide to Von Blenheim
- Henry Woodward as Georges
- Jane Wolfe as Marie-Jeanne
- Noah Beery role unknown, (*he's in surviving still in naval uniform)

== See also ==
- Wallace Reid filmography
