= Less Than Kin =

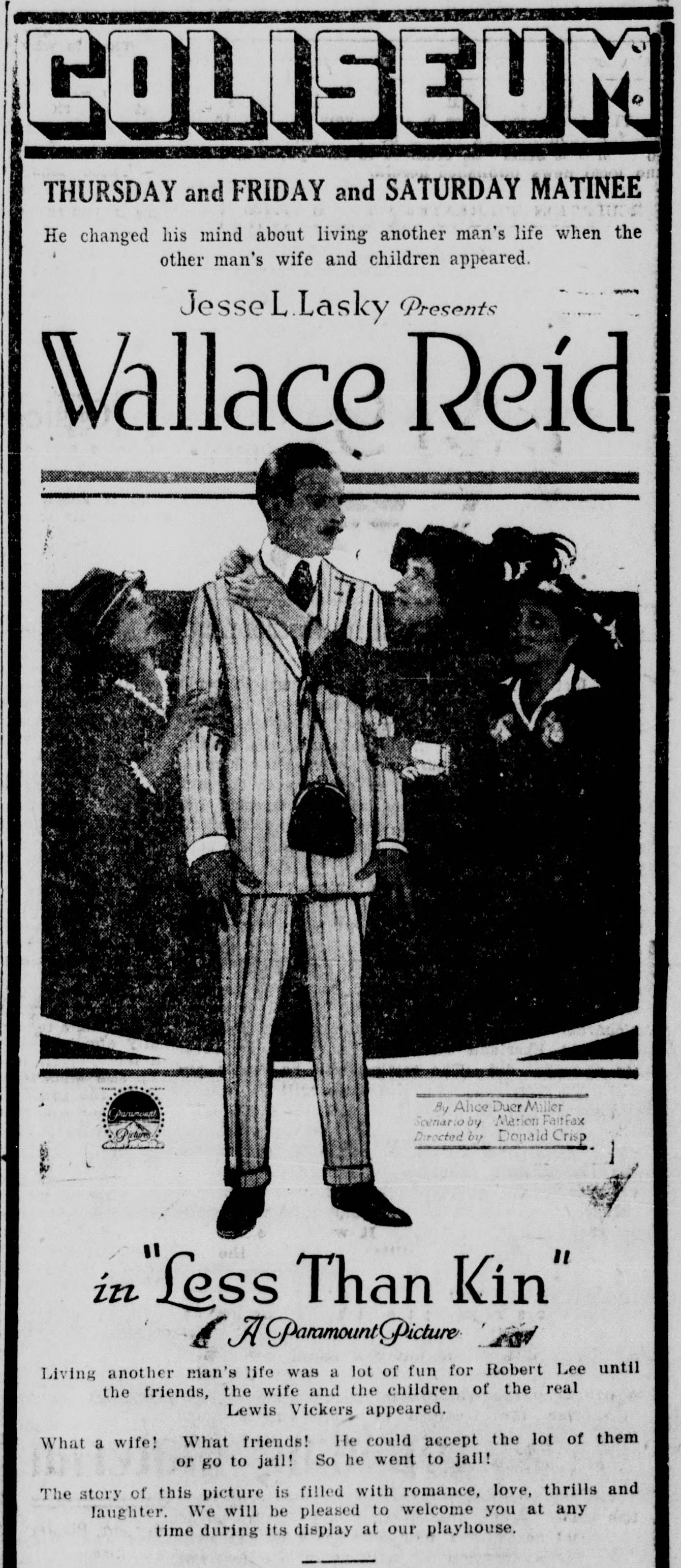
- Newspaper advertisement
- Directed by: Donald Crisp
- Screenplay by: Marion Fairfax
- Based on: Less Than Kin (novel) by Alice Duer Miller
- Produced by: Jesse L. Lasky
- Starring: Wallace Reid; Ann Little; Raymond Hatton; Noah Beery, Sr. James Neill; Charles Ogle
- Cinematography: Henry Kotani
- Production company: Jesse L. Lasky Feature Play Company
- Distributed by: Paramount Pictures
- Release date: July 21, 1918
- Running time: 50 minutes
- Country: United States
- Language: Silent (English intertitles)

Less Than Kin is a lost 1918 American silent comedy film directed by Donald Crisp and written by Marion Fairfax and Alice Duer Miller. The film stars Wallace Reid, Ann Little, Raymond Hatton, Noah Beery, Sr., James Neill and Charles Ogle. The film was released on July 21, 1918, by Paramount Pictures.

== Plot ==
As described in a film magazine, Lewis Vickers, a young American languishing in South America because he is "wanted" for a crime which was the result of an accident, comes across another American Hobart Lee who greatly resembles him. That man dies and Vickers, to get back to the United States, decides to impersonate him. He is taken to the family group upon his arrival in New York City and soon finds himself possessed of the encumbrances and debts left by the former youth, which include a wife and three children. He is left a fortune, but discloses his identity and flees to Canada. En route he marries the ward of his benefactor, who had helped him escape and had hid in his automobile. Eventually he is cleared of all guilt and has a happy ending.

== Cast ==
- Wallace Reid as Hobart Lee / Lewis Vickers
- Ann Little as Nellie Reid
- Raymond Hatton as James Emmons
- Noah Beery, Sr. as Senor Cortez
- James Neill as Dr. Nunez
- Charles Ogle as Overton
- Jane Wolfe as Maria (credited as Jane Wolff)
- James Cruze as Jinx
- Guy Oliver as Peters
- Calvert Carter as Plimpton
- Jack Herbert as Sheriff (credited as J. Herbert)
- Gustav von Seyffertitz as Endicott Lee

== See also ==
- Wallace Reid filmography
