= The House of Silence =

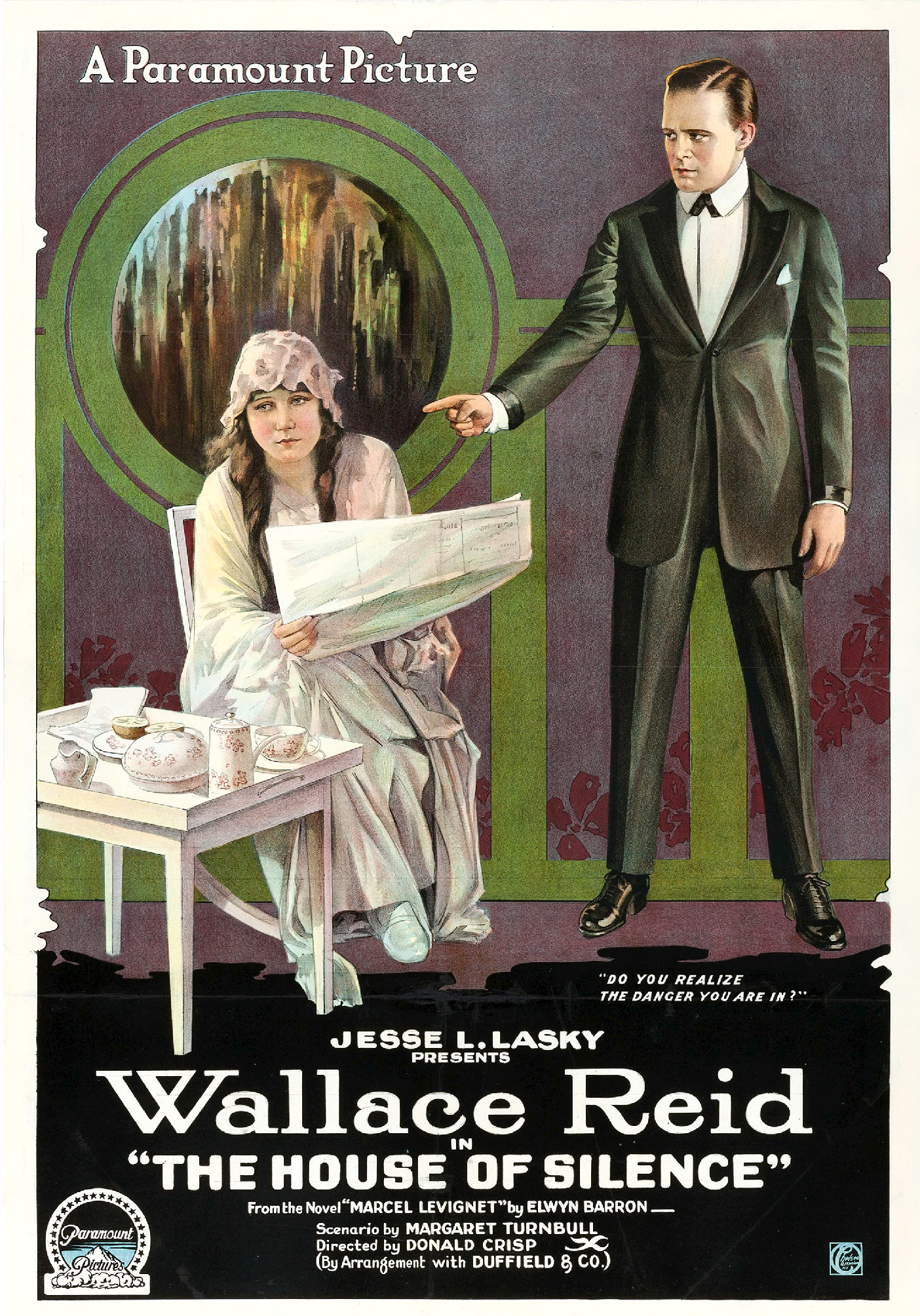
- Film poster
- Directed by: Donald Crisp
- Screenplay by: Elwyn Alfred Barron; Margaret Turnbull
- Produced by: Jesse L. Lasky
- Starring: Wallace Reid; Ann Little; Adele Farrington; Winter Hall; Ernest Joy; Henry A. Barrows
- Cinematography: Henry Kotani
- Production company: Jesse L. Lasky Feature Play Company
- Distributed by: Paramount Pictures
- Release date: April 8, 1918
- Running time: 50 minutes
- Country: United States
- Language: Silent (English intertitles)

The House of Silence is a lost 1918 American silent drama film directed by Donald Crisp and written by Elwyn Alfred Barron and Margaret Turnbull. The film stars Wallace Reid, Ann Little, Adele Farrington, Winter Hall, Ernest Joy, and Henry A. Barrows. The film was released on April 8, 1918, by Paramount Pictures.

== Cast ==
- Wallace Reid as Marcel Levington
- Ann Little as Toinette Rogers
- Adele Farrington as Mrs. Clifton
- Winter Hall as Dr. Henry Rogers
- Ernest Joy as Leroy
- Henry A. Barrows as Carter

== Reception ==
Like many American films of the time, The House of Silence was subject to cuts by city and state film censorship boards. For example, the Chicago Board of Censors issued an Adults Only permit for the film and required cuts, in Reel 1, of the intertitles "You know nothing" etc. and "You've made a mess of it" etc., Reel 3, the intertitle "No, I'm not interested in that sort of thing", entire incident of old woman stumbling on street and young woman assisting her into house, Reel 5, the intertitle "Expect a new one tonight with the usual fee", and the scene of the raid on the house where the women are shown. The Chicago board also directed that the character of the "House of Silence" was to be changed from that of a questionable resort or assignation house to that of a rendezvous for society crooks by inserting a new intertitle, just before the woman leader is shown on the porch, "The House of Silence, a rendezvous for society wolves where criminal activities are cleverly concealed beneath a veneer of respectability" and, after the intertitle "If it is such a notorious place, why is it not raided", insert a new intertitle "Curiously enough the brains of the organization is a woman whose cunning the police have been unable to cope."

== See also ==
- Wallace Reid filmography
