= The Mystery of Yellow Aster Mine =

1913 short film by Frank Borzage

- Directed by: Frank Borzage
- Written by: Bess Meredyth
- Production company: Bison Motion Pictures
- Distributed by: Universal Film Manufacturing Company
- Release date: August 26, 1913 (U.S.)
- Country: United States

The Mystery of Yellow Aster Mine is a 1913 American short drama silent black and white film directed by Frank Borzage and starring Wallace Reid, Pauline Bush and Arthur Rosson. It was made in June and released on August 26.

== Cast ==
- Wallace Reid as Reid - Rosson's Brother
- Pauline Bush as Pauline
- Arthur Rosson as Rosson - Reid's Brother
- Frank Borzage

== See also ==
- Wallace Reid filmography
