= Wallace Reid Jr. =

American Actor

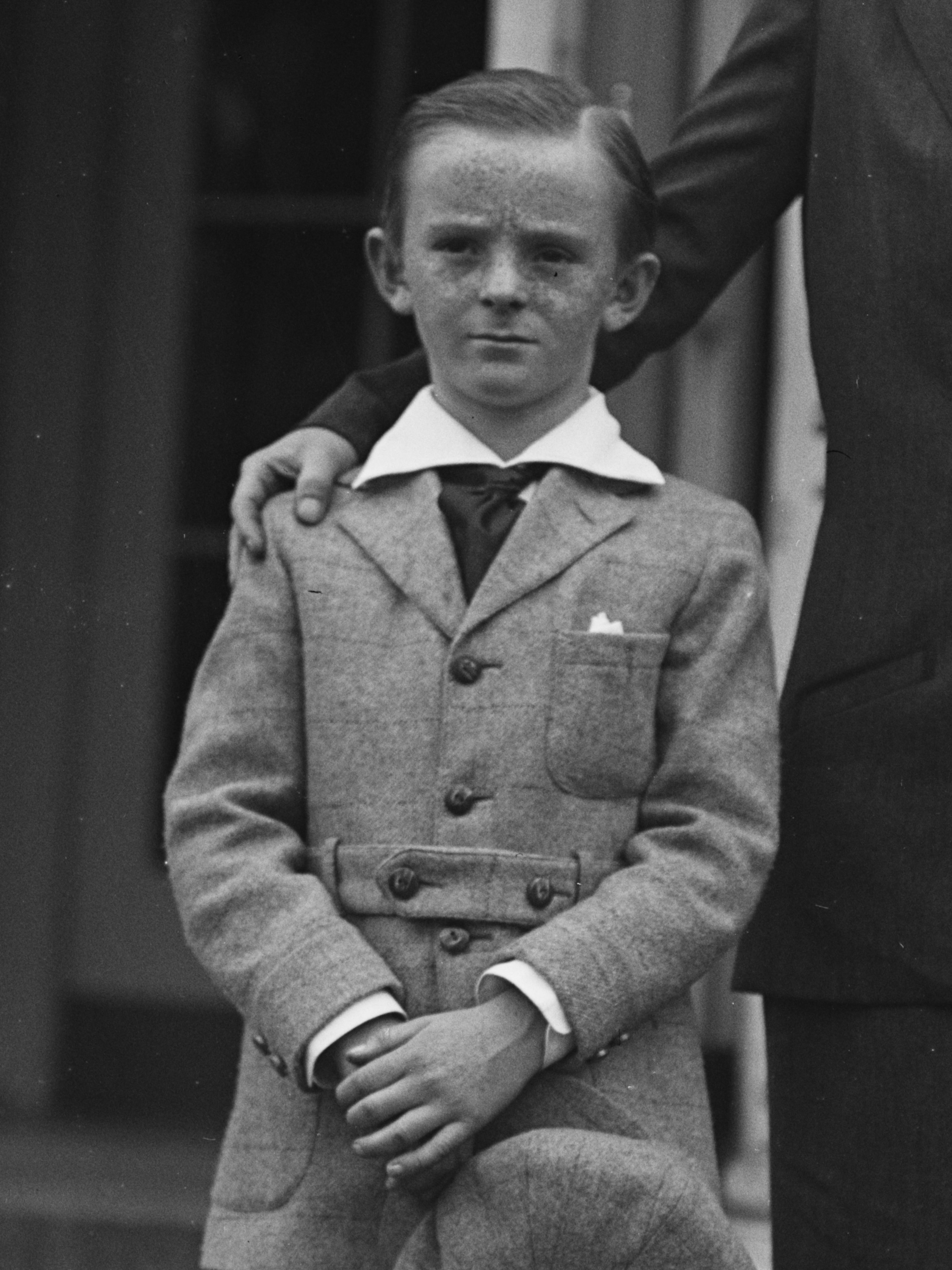
- Reid in 1925
- Born: June 18, 1917; Los Angeles, California, US
- Died: February 28, 1990 (aged 72); Santa Monica Bay, California, United States
- Other name: Wally Reid Jr.
- Occupations: Actor, Architect
- Years active: 1920–1943
- Spouse(s): Nora Pauline Teston (m. 1943–1968) Ruth Dugan (m. 1979)
- Children: 6
- Parents: Wallace Reid (father); Dorothy Davenport (mother)
- Relatives: Hal Reid (grandfather); Harry Davenport (grandfather); Alice Davenport (grandmother); Edward Loomis Davenport (great-grandfather); Fanny Vining Davenport (great-grandmother)
- Family: Rankin family

William Wallace Reid Jr. (June 18, 1917 – February 28, 1990) was an American actor and architect.

== Biography ==
William Wallace Reid Jr. was born June 18, 1917 in Los Angeles, California. His parents Wallace Reid Sr. and Dorothy Davenport were both actors. His materal grandparents were actors Harry Davenport and Alice Davenport. While his paternal grandparents were stage actors Bertha Westbrook and James Halleck Reid. Reid was also related to the Rankin acting family through his grandfather Harry Davenport's marriage to Phyllis Rankin and adoption her two children Catherine and Arthur Rankin. Reid had one sister, Betty Anna Reid, that his parents adopted in 1922 as a three-year-old.

Reid's father died from influenza on January 18, 1923, when he was just four-years old.

By the time he was 15 years old, Reid was interested in automobiles. When he came home from school he regularly changed clothes and began working on a four-cylinder racing car that he and a friend were building by using parts from old cars. In 1936 he served a 15-day jail sentence for reckless driving.

Reid's entry into the film industry came when he worked for independent producer Willis Kent.

He appeared in 10 films, later becoming an architect. He died at age 72 when his home-built Rutan Long-EZ airplane crashed into Santa Monica Bay, near his home, during heavy fog.

== Filmography ==
Year	Title	Role	Notes
1918	His Extra Bit	The Child	Short
1920	Excuse My Dust	'Toodles' Walden Jr.	
1922	The Masked Avenger	The School Boy	
1932	The Racing Strain	Bill Westcott / The Big Shot	
1933	This Day and Age	Student	Uncredited
1935	The Hoosier Schoolmaster	Hank	
1936	The Adventures of Frank Merriwell	Wally Reid	
1940	Black Friday	Student	Uncredited
1940	Gold Rush Maisie	Matt Sullivan	
1940	King of the Royal Mounted	Constable Doyle	Uncredited
1940	North West Mounted Police	Constable Rankin	
1943	The Outlaw	Townsman Bystander	Uncredited
1943	Bomber's Moon	Pilot	Uncredited

== Sources ==
- Fleming, E.J. (2007). Wallace Reid: The life and death of a Hollywood idol. Jefferson, NC: McFarland & Company. ISBN 978-0-7864-7725-8 – via Google Books.
