= The World for Sale =

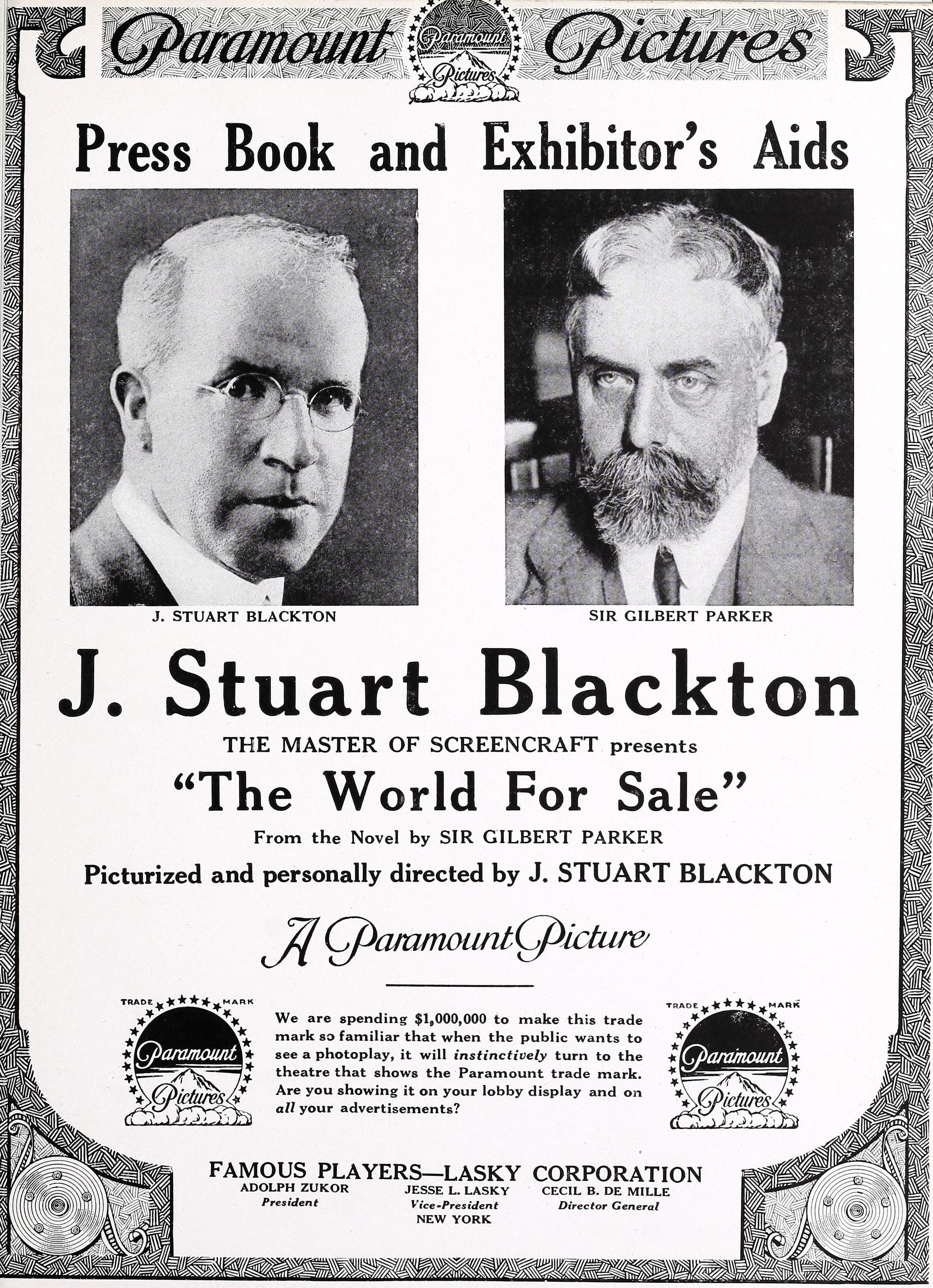
- Advertisement for the film
- Directed by: J. Stuart Blackton
- Based on: The World For Sale by Gilbert Parker
- Produced by: J. Stuart Blackton
- Starring: Conway Tearle; Ann Little; W.W. Bitner; Norbert Wicki; Crazy Thunder; E.L. Fernandez
- Production company: J. Stuart Blackton Feature Pictures
- Distributed by: Paramount Pictures
- Release date: January 21, 1918
- Running time: 50 minutes
- Country: United States
- Language: Silent (English intertitles)

The World for Sale is a 1918 American silent drama film directed by J. Stuart Blackton and starring Conway Tearle, Ann Little, W.W. Bitner, Norbert Wicki, Crazy Thunder, and E.L. Fernandez. It is based on the 1916 novel The World For Sale by Gilbert Parker. The film was released on January 21, 1918, by Paramount Pictures. It is not known whether the film currently survives, and it may be a lost film.

== Plot ==
As described in a film magazine, Fleda Druse and her father Gabriel sever their connections with the wandering Romani and become Christians. In childhood Fieda had been given in marriage to Jethro Fawe, and in accordance with the gypsy creed and after a 17-year separation Jethro comes to claim his bride. Fleda loves Ingolby, leader of the Canadian settlement, and will not accept the attentions of Jethro. Jethro attempts to take the life of Ingolby, but is repulsed. Marchand, an adventurer, is jealous of Ingolby and attacks him, leading to Ingolby's blindness. Fleda cares for him and, after his sight is restored, they come to an understanding. Jethro has Fleda kidnapped and brought to his tent, but her father comes to her rescue. When Fleda decides to go with Ingolby, Gabriel returns to lead the Romani.

== Cast ==
- Conway Tearle as Ingolby
- Ann Little as Fleda Druse
- W.W. Bitner as Gabriel Druse
- Norbert Wicki as Jethro Fawe
- Crazy Thunder as Tekewani
- E.L. Fernandez as Marchand
- Joseph Donohue as Jowett
- Emile La Croix
- Maude Scofield

== Production ==
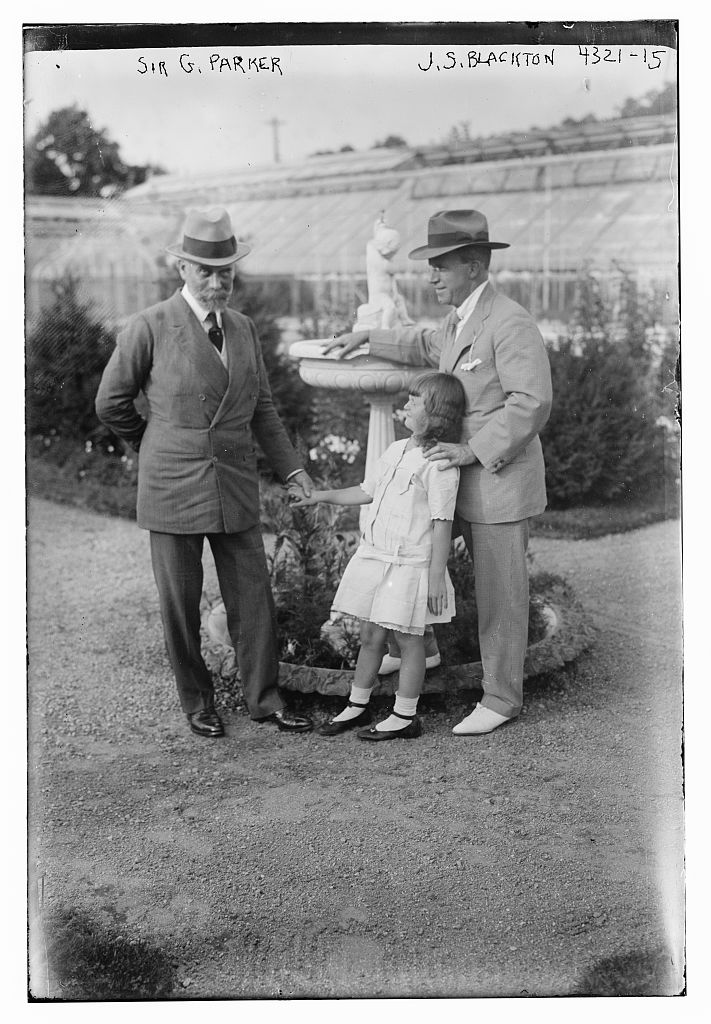
Sir Gilbert Parker (left) at Harbourwood with J. Stuart Blackton and his daughter Violet

A number of the exteriors for The World for Sale were filmed at Harbourwood, J. Stuart Blackton's vast estate at Oyster Bay, New York. Sir Gilbert Parker visited for a week during the shooting. "Sir Gilbert, bless him, refused to unbend," wrote Blackton's older daughter Marian Blackton Trimble. "Tall, bearded, reticent, he stood out against the noisy informality of the actors and house guests like a mastiff in a circle of yapping cocker spaniels."

== Reception ==
Like many American films of the time, The World for Sale was subject to cuts by city and state film censorship boards. For example, the Chicago Board of Censors required a cut, in Reel 2, of the intertitle "I claim my rights. Here, where a Romany and his wife are together.", Reel 3, man throwing a missile into a man's neck, Reel 5, the letter "My father knows you broke promise to me — and my shame" and the intertitle "He spoil may summer song. He treat her like dirt.", Reel 6, muffling young woman, gypsy cutting young woman's throat, and the intertitle "It shall be so — I know women — for an hour you will hate me and then you will begin to love me."
