= Nan of Music Mountain =

1917 film

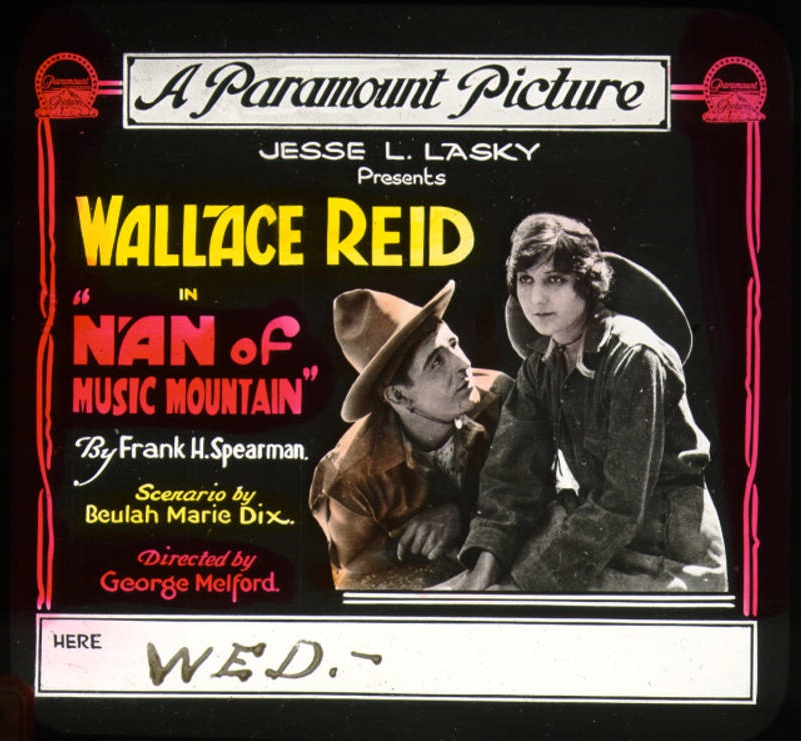
- Lantern slide
- Directed by: George Melford; Cecil B. DeMille (uncredited)
- Written by: Beulah Marie Dix
- Based on: Nan of Music Mountain by Frank H. Spearman
- Produced by: Jesse Lasky
- Starring: Wallace Reid
- Cinematography: Paul P. Perry
- Distributed by: Paramount Pictures
- Release date: December 12, 1917
- Running time: 50 minutes
- Country: United States
- Language: Silent (English intertitles)

Nan of Music Mountain is a 1917 American silent drama film directed by George Melford and Cecil B. DeMille (who receives no screen credit). The film is based on Frank H. Spearman's novel of the same name and stars Wallace Reid and Anna Little.

== Plot ==
As described in a film magazine, Henry de Spain is determined to find the man who murdered his father. He becomes sort of an outsider with Duke Morgan's gang, cattlemen, and outlaws. Nan, daughter of the head of the clan, secretly loves Henry and when he is wounded in a fight with the Morgan clan, she helps him escape. This angers her father and he declares that she shall marry her cousin. Nan dispatches a message to Henry for assistance and he brings her safely to his clan. Nan then learns that her father was the murder of Henry's father. She returns to her father to learn the truth and together they go to Henry and reveal the murder's name. After a thorough understanding and forgiving, Henry and Nan are married.

== Cast ==
- Wallace Reid as Henry de Spain
- Ann Little as Nan Morgan
- Theodore Roberts as Duke Morgan
- James Cruze as Gale Morgan
- Charles Ogle as Sassoon
- Raymond Hatton as Logan
- Hart Hoxie as Sandusky
- Ernest Joy as Lefever
- Guy Oliver as Bull Page
- James P. Mason as Scott
- Henry Woodward as Jeffries
- Horace B. Carpenter as McAlpin

== Reception ==
Like many American films of the time, Nan of Music Mountain was subject to cuts by city and state film censorship boards. The Chicago Board of Censors required a cut of the shooting of a rancher during a vision, the intertitle "You'll go home when I get through with you", and the last shooting by de Spain.
