= Ann Little =

American actress (1891–1984)

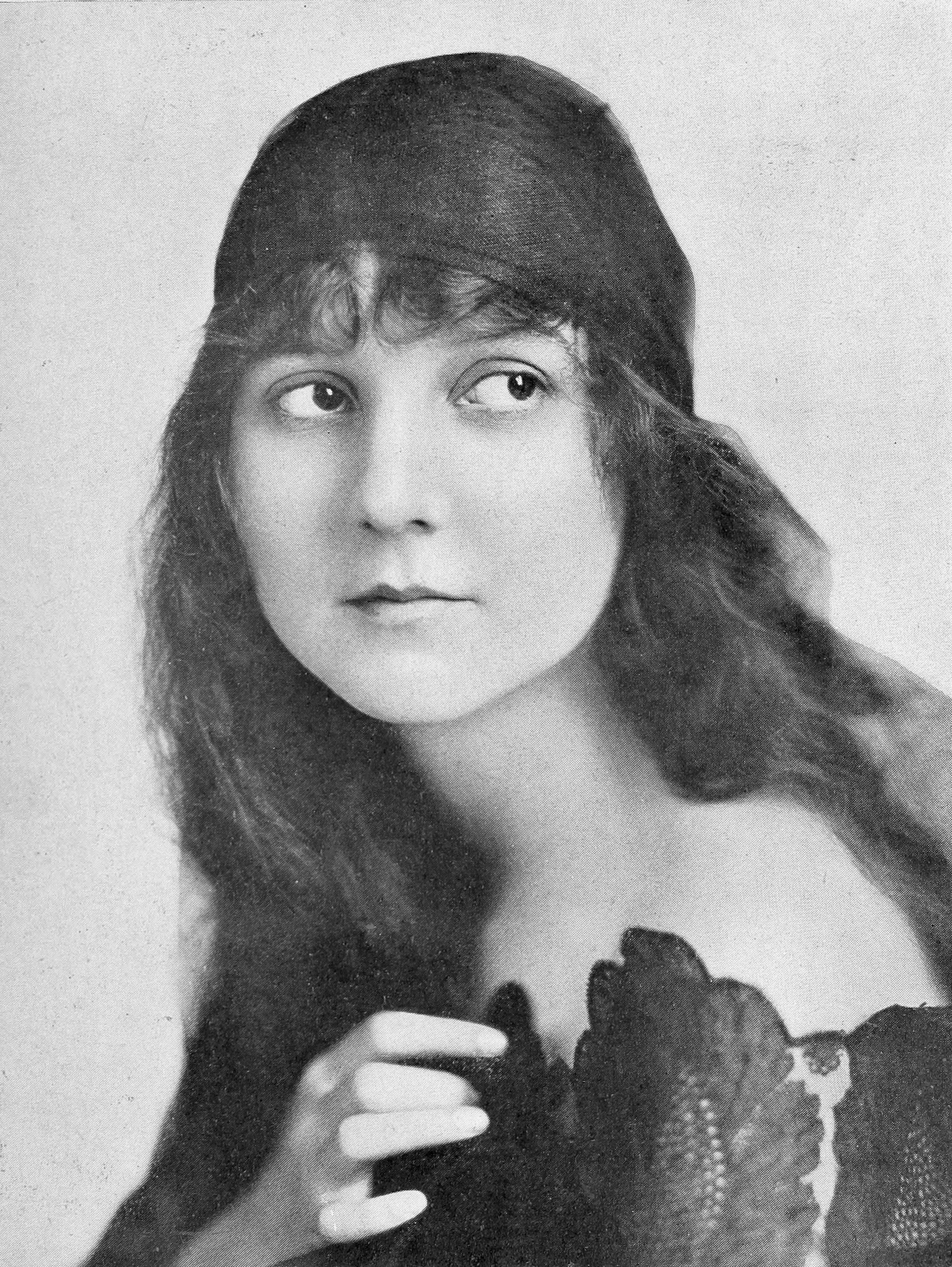
- Little in 1916
- Born: Mary Hankins Brooks; February 7, 1891; Mount Shasta, California, U.S.
- Died: May 21, 1984 (aged 93); Los Angeles, California, U.S.
- Resting place: Forest Lawn Memorial Park, Glendale, California, U.S.
- Other names: Anna Little
- Occupation: Actress
- Years active: 1911–1925
- Spouse: Allan Forrest (m. 1916; div. 1918)

Ann Little (born Mary Hankins Brooks; February 7, 1891 – May 21, 1984), also known as Anna Little, was an American film actress whose career was most prolific during the silent film era of the early 1910s through the early 1920s. Today, most of her films are lost, with only 12 known to survive.

== Life and career ==
Ann Little was born Mary Hankins Brooks on February 7, 1891, on a ranch in Mount Shasta, California. She was the only child of Mary Mariah "Mamie" Hankins Brooks, who was from Montana, and James Luther Brooks, who was from New York. In the 1900 census, she is listed as living in Chicago, Illinois, alongside her mother and father as roomers. She appears in the 1910 census as living in Mount Shasta again as a roomer with the Levy family, and her marital status is "married". Little first appeared in a traveling, stock-theater group after graduating from high school at age 16.

After briefly relocating to San Francisco in the early 1910s, she acted in musical comedies on stage before she made the transition to films; first appearing in one-reel Western shorts with actor and director Broncho Billy Anderson. Her first film appearance was in the 1911 release The Indian Maiden's Lesson as a Native American named Red Feather. Little subsequently appeared as Native American characters in many of her earliest films.

By 1912, Little appeared regularly in Thomas H. Ince-directed Western-themed serials, often as an Indian princess and usually with Francis Ford, Grace Cunard, Olive Tell, Jack Conway, Ethel Grandin, Mildred Harris, and early cowboy star Art Acord for Essanay Studios. Between 1911 and 1914, Little was in around 60 shorts, the overwhelming majority of them Westerns, including many serials. Her other notable co-stars at this time included Harold Lockwood, Jane Wolfe, William Worthington, Tom Chatterton, and actor/director Frank Borzage.

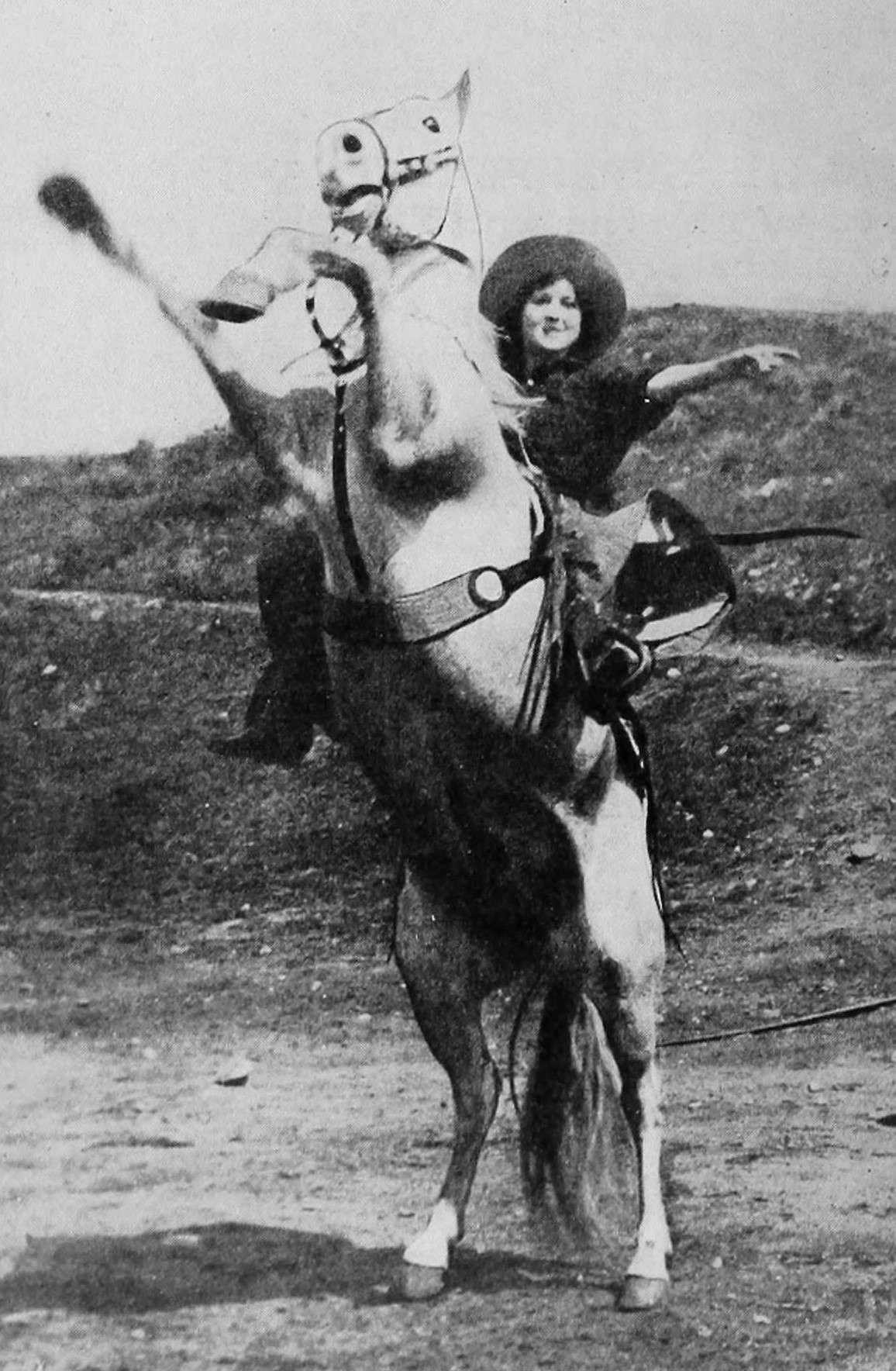
Little as Kate Arnold in Lightning Bryce (1919)

Although possibly best recalled for her appearances in Westerns, Little showed versatility as an actress by appearing in a number of well-received roles in other dramatic genres and even comedies. Most notably among her dramatic roles was the early American cinematic Civil War serials directed by William J. Bauman and Thomas Ince. Another notable film was the 1914 Ruth Ann Baldwin-penned and Allan Dwan-adapted epic Damon and Pythias, which had thousands of extras. While signed under contract to Universal Studios, she made nearly six serials, most of them Western-themed one- and two-reel dramas.

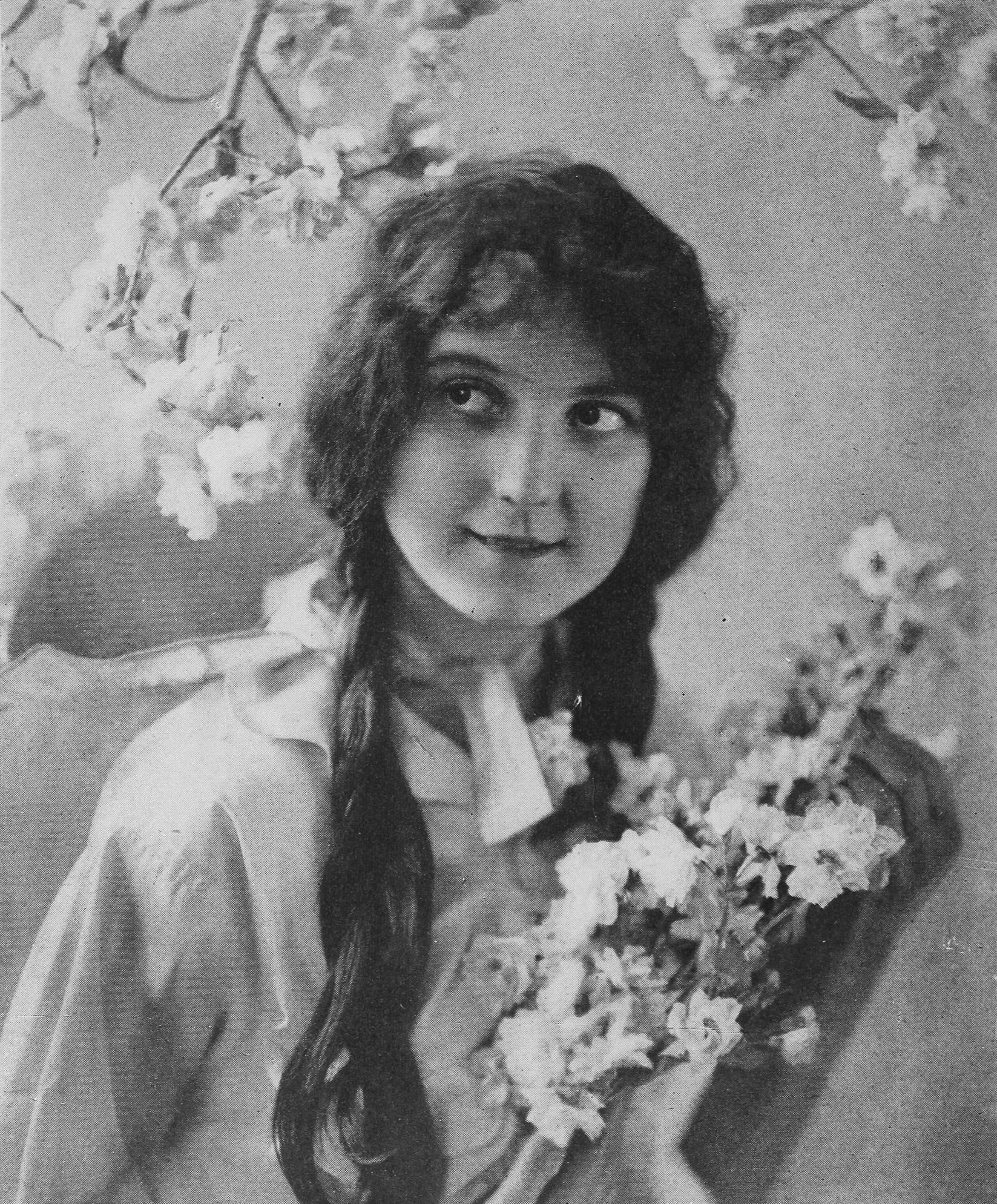
Little in Motion Picture Magazine, June 1915

By 1917, Little signed to Paramount Pictures and was often paired with highly successful actor Wallace Reid in a number of popular dramas and comedies. Although she was allegedly tired of being typecast in Western serials, she starred opposite cowboy actor Jack Hoxie in the 1919 serial Lightning Bryce. She left Famous Players–Lasky studios in 1919 to sign with National Film Corporation.

By the early 1920s, Little only took dramatic roles outside the Western genre. Some of her notable films in this period include the World War I drama The Firefly of France (1918), the race-car adventure films The Roaring Road (1919) and Excuse My Dust (1920) with Wallace Reid, The Cradle of Courage with William S. Hart, and the crime-drama The Greatest Menace (1923) opposite Wilfred Lucas.

== Later years ==
While still at the peak of her public popularity in the early 1920s, Little retired from the motion picture industry. In her later years, she managed the Chateau Marmont on the Sunset Strip, but rarely spoke of her years in acting.

Ann Little died at age 93, in Los Angeles, on May 21, 1984. She was interred at the Forest Lawn Memorial Park in Glendale, California.

== Partial filmography ==
- Custer's Last Fight (1912, short)
- The Invaders (1912, short) as Sky Star
- The Paymaster's Son (1913)
- The Battle of Gettysburg (1913, short, lost film) as Virginia Burke, the Confederate Sister
- The Voice at the Telephone (1914) as Clara Morrison
- The Opened Shutters (1914) as Sylvia Lacey
- Damon and Pythias (1914) as Calanthe
- Called Back (1914) as Pauline March
- The Black Box (1915, serial, lost film) as Lenora MacDougal
- That Gal of Burke's (1916, short) as Tommie Burke
- Land o' Lizards (1916) as Bobbie Moore
- Immediate Lee (1916) as Beulah
- The Silent Master (1917) as Jacqueline
- Under Handicap (1917) as Argyl Crawford
- Nan of Music Mountain (1917) as Nan Morgan
- The World for Sale (1918) as Fieda Druse
- Rimrock Jones (1918, lost film) as Mary Fortune
- The House of Silence (1918, lost film) as Toinette Rogers
- Believe Me, Xantippe (1918, lost film) as Dolly Kamman
- The Firefly of France (1918, lost film) as Esme Falconer
- Less Than Kin (1918) as Nellie Reid
- The Source (1918) as Svea Nord
- The Man from Funeral Range (1918, lost film) as Janice Williams
- The Squaw Man (1918, lost film, only the last reel exists) as Naturich
- Alias Mike Moran (1919) as Elaine Debaux
- The Roaring Road (1919) as Dorothy Ward, the Cub
- Something to Do (1919) as Jane Remwick
- Square Deal Sanderson (1919) as Mary Bransford
- Told in the Hills (1919) as Rachel Hardy
- Lightning Bryce (1919) as Kate Arnold
- Excuse My Dust (1920) as Dorothy Ward Walden
- The Cradle of Courage (1920) as Rose Tierney
- The Blue Fox (1921) as Ann Calvin
- Nan of the North (1922, lost film) as Nan
- Chain Lightning (1922) as Peggy Pomeroy
- The Eagle's Talons (1923, lost film) as Enid Markham
- The Greatest Menace (1923) as Velma Wright
- Secret Service Sanders (1925) as Ann Walters
