= David Menefee =

American science fiction writer

David Wayne Menefee is an American science fiction writer from Fort Worth, Texas. After his work as a journalist for the Dallas Times Herald, he wrote and published several nonfiction works before venturing into science fiction with The Questionable Olga Schumaker Story series. In addition, he has served as an editor on numerous other books.

The Questionable Olga Schumaker Story series includes SKY KING (2024), The Final Journey to the Center of the Earth, ZION, RA, and others.

== Biography ==
He was born in Fort Worth, Texas, a member of a long-established family among the earliest American settlers in Texas. The Menefee family is honored with an historical marker administered by the Texas Historical Commission. His great-great-grandfather, William Menefee, was one of the signers of the Texas Declaration of Independence from Mexico. William's portrait hangs in the San Jacinto Monument in San Jacinto, Texas.

Menefee started his writing career in 1979 as a writer and marketing representative for the Dallas Times Herald, working for twelve years during an era characterized by fierce competition with an archrival, the Dallas Morning News. In 1991, the Dallas Morning News bought out the Herald, closed the business, and within weeks, razed the building to the ground. Associates from the Dallas Morning News invited Menefee to join their operation, which combined their circulation with subscribers obtained by their acquisition of the Herald. Menefee took on leadership responsibilities with their locally produced version of Parade Magazine, for which he anonymously contributed many articles.

== Freelance writer and editor ==
Since 2000, Menefee has worked in the science fiction genre. Initially, Menefee, like many of his contemporaries, broke away from the newspaper industry in 2003 when failing economics forced many publications to downsize or close altogether. He struck out on his own as a freelance writer, immediately finding success with several books about the silent film era: Sarah Bernhardt in the Theater of Films and Sound Recordings (McFarland, 2003), The First Female Stars: Women of the Silent Era (Greenwood Praeger, 2004), and The First Male Stars: Men of the Silent Era (BearManor Media, 2008).

His Richard Barthelmess: A Life in Pictures (2009) was named by the San Francisco Examiner as one of the Top Ten Film Books of 2009.

In 2006, Menefee worked for Brown Books Publishing Group, serving as editor on Sonnets by Robert Brown, Slaves to Medicine by Dr. George Beauchamp, and Downtown Dallas: Romantic Past, Modern Renaissance by Mark Rice. That year, he collaborated with Richard Davis on Lilian Hall-Davis: The English Rose, a biography of Britain's noted silent film star.

In 2009, Menefee worked for BearManor Media, serving as editor.

In 2010, Menefee shared credit along with William Thomas Jr. on "Otay" The Billy "Buckwheat" Thomas Story. He also edited Tales from the Script by author Gene Perrett, Six Cult Films from the Sixties by author Ib Melchior, Will the Real Me Please Stand Up by author Christopher Knopf, Endless Summer: My Life With The Beach Boys by author Jack Lloyd, Confessions of a Scream Queen by author Matt Beckoff, as well as Now and Then, The Movies Get It Right by Neal Stannard.

Early in 2010, Menefee published George O'Brien: A Man's Man in Hollywood, the first full-length biography and filmography of one of Hollywood's most beloved stars. Menefee earned many positive reviews, including one from John Gallagher in the April 2010 National Board of Review:

"Menefee has done his research here, accessing the O’Brien estate, and loading the book with great graphics and rare photos. O’Brien was the son of the Chief of Police of San Francisco, and the author does a particularly excellent job in recreating the details of the 1906 earthquake and fire, which the O’Brien family survived."

In 2011, BearManor Media published Menefee's Wally: The True Wallace Reid Story (Foreword by Robert Osborne), the first full-length tribute to the renowned silent film star, Wallace Reid.

From 2011 to 2026, Menefee works on science fiction book and attends various genre events.

He currently lives in Texas, USA.

== Works as author ==
- SKY KING.
- RA
- ZION
- The Final Journey to the Center of the Earth
- Charlie O'Doone's Second Chance
- EPIC
- Sweet Memories
- Brothers of the Storm
- Secret Soldier, Master of Disguise
- Margot Cranston The Mystery at Loon Lake with Robert Willis
- Margot Cranston The Voice in the Shadows with Robert Willis
- Margot Cranston The Secret of the St. Lawrence Lighthouse with Robert Willis
- Margot Cranston The Quest for the Jade Dragons with Robert Willis
- The First Male Stars: Men of the Silent Era
- The First Female Stars: Women of the Silent Era
- Wally The True Wallace Reid Story
- Sarah Bernhardt in the Theater of Films and Sound Recordings
- Richard Barthelmess: A Life in Pictures
- George O'Brien: A Man's Man in Hollywood
- The Rise and Fall of Lou-Tellegen
- Otay! The Billy Buckwheat Thomas Story with William Thomas Jr.
- Can't Help Falling in Love with Carol Dunitz
- Come Away to Paradise with Carol Dunitz

== Sources ==
- Review of Sarah Bernhardt in the Theater of Films and Sound Recordings by Catherine Ritchie, Theater Librarian, Fine Arts Division Dallas (TX) Public Library, in Broadside, 2003.
- Choice, September 2004.
- Booklist, June 2004.
- Journal of American Studies, 2005.
- Thomas Gladysz, "Top Ten Film Books of 2009," San Francisco Examiner, 15 December 2009
- Western Clippings Issue #93, January/February 2010, p. 14.
- "George O'Brien: A Man's Man in Hollywood." By John Gallagher in Between Action and Cut. New York: National Board of Review, April 2010.
- Review of George O'Brien A Man's Man in Hollywood by Cynthia Tobar, Mina Rees Library, CUNY Graduate Center, in Broadside, Summer 2010.
