= Rimrock Jones =

1918 film

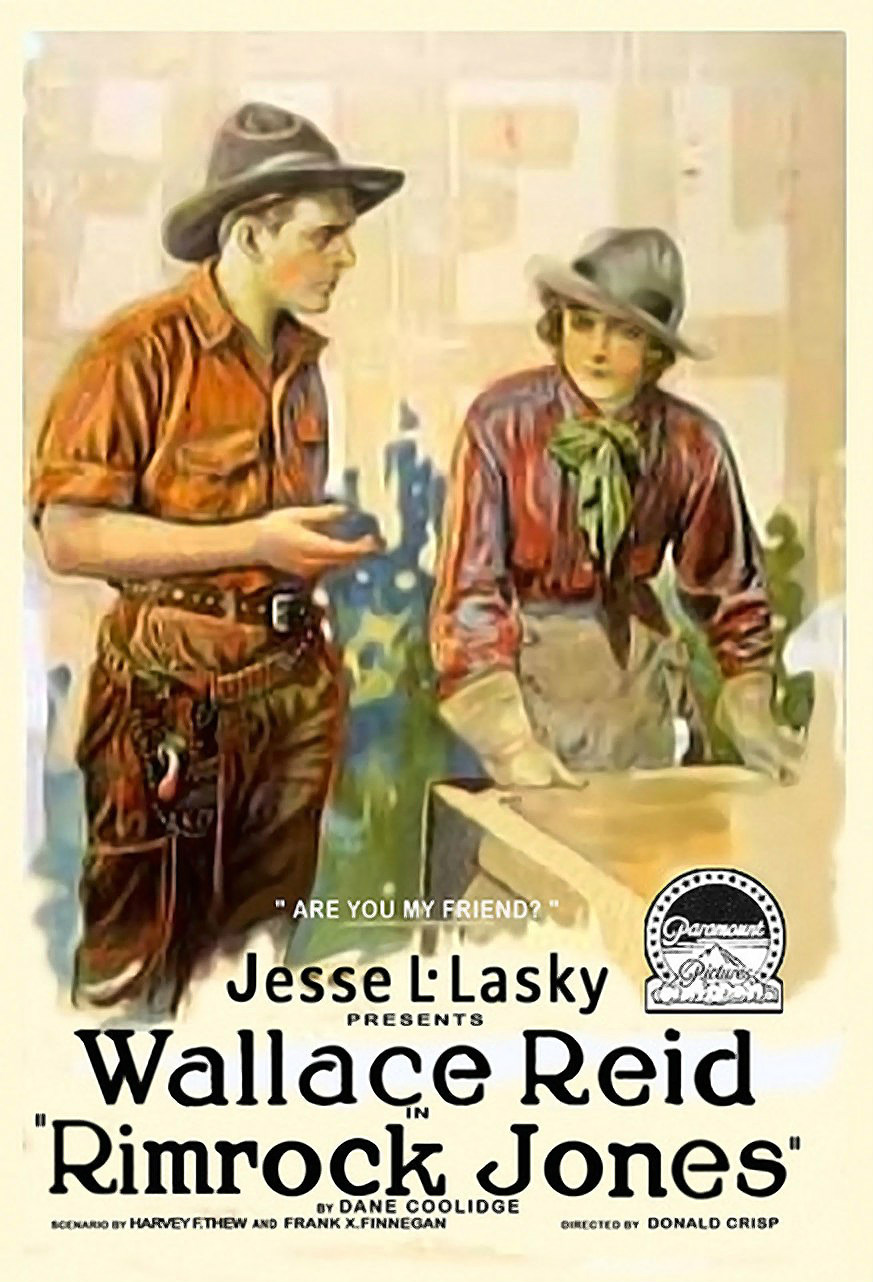
- Film poster
- Directed by: Donald Crisp; Louis Howland (assistant)
- Written by: Harvey F. Thew (scenario); Frank X. Finnegan (scenario)
- Based on: Rimrock Jones by Dane Coolidge
- Produced by: Jesse Lasky
- Starring: Wallace Reid; Ann Little
- Cinematography: Faxon M. Dean
- Production company: Jesse L. Lasky Feature Play Company
- Distributed by: Paramount Pictures
- Release date: January 21, 1918
- Running time: 5 reels
- Country: United States
- Languages: Silent; English intertitles

Rimrock Jones is a lost 1918 American silent Western film directed by Donald Crisp and starring Wallace Reid.

== Cast ==
- Wallace Reid as Rimrock Jones
- Ann Little as Mary Fortune
- Charles Stanton Ogle as Hassayamp Hicks
- Paul Hurst as Ike Bray
- Guy Oliver as Andrew McBain
- Fred Huntley as Leon Lockhart
- Edna Mae Cooper as Hazel Hardesty
- Tote Du Crow as Juan Soto
- Gustav von Seyffertitz as Stoddard
- Ernest Joy as Jepson
- George Kuwa as Woe Chong
- Mary Mersch as Mrs. Hardesty

== Reception ==
Like many American films of the time, Rimrock Jones was subject to cuts by city and state film censorship boards. The Chicago Board of Censors required cuts, in Reel 1, of two scenes of a Mexican and Jones shooting at each other, the flashing of all roulette scenes, and, in Reel 3, two shooting scenes.
