= The Man from Funeral Range =

1918 film

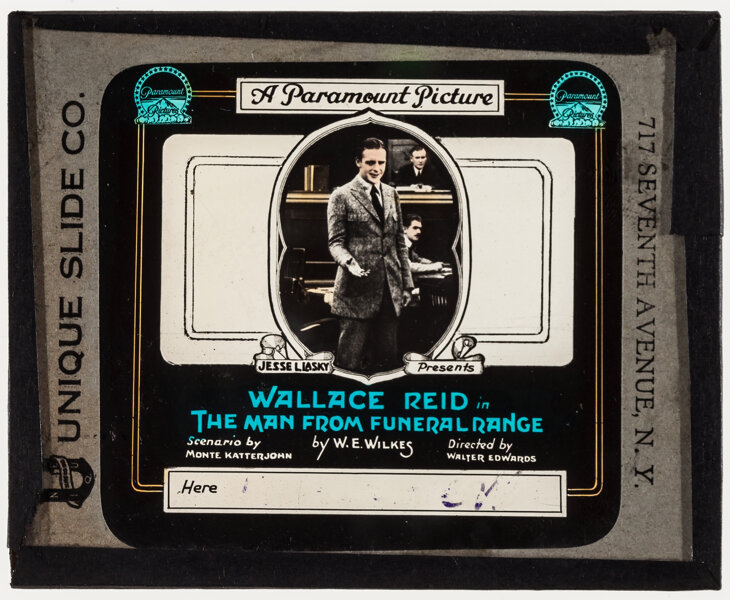
- Directed by: Walter Edwards
- Screenplay by: Monte M. Katterjohn; W.E. Wilkes
- Produced by: Jesse L. Lasky
- Starring: Wallace Reid; Ann Little; Lottie Pickford; Willis Marks; Tully Marshall; George A. McDaniel
- Cinematography: James Van Trees
- Production company: Famous Players–Lasky Corporation
- Distributed by: Paramount Pictures
- Release date: October 6, 1918
- Running time: 50 minutes
- Country: United States
- Languages: Silent; English intertitles

The Man from Funeral Range is a lost 1918 American silent Western film directed by Walter Edwards and written by Monte M. Katterjohn and W.E. Wilkes. The film stars Wallace Reid, Ann Little, Lottie Pickford, Willis Marks, Tully Marshall, and George A. McDaniel. The film was released on October 6, 1918, by Paramount Pictures.

== Plot ==
The story centers around a prospector named Harry Webb who returns to town from the desolate Funeral Range. He falls in love with a cabaret singer, Janice Williams. A series of unfortunate events leads to Harry being falsely accused of a crime he did not commit. To protect Janice, he takes the blame. Sentenced to death, Harry escapes from the train and disappears into the desert. He eventually returns, disguised, with a plan to clear his name. Through a dramatic turn of events, the real culprit is exposed, and Harry's innocence is finally proven. He is reunited with Janice and can finally live a life free from injustice.

== Cast ==
- Wallace Reid as Harry Webb
- Ann Little as Janice Williams
- Lottie Pickford as Dixie
- Willis Marks as Joe Budlong
- Tully Marshall as Frank Beekman
- George A. McDaniel as Mark Brenton
- Phil Ainsworth as Freddie Leighton
- Tom Guise as Colonel Leighton

== Reception ==
Like many American films of the time, The Man from Funeral Range was subject to cuts by city and state film censorship boards. For example, the Chicago Board of Censors required cuts, in Reel 2, of the young woman shooting the man and, in Reel 4, two scenes of an attack on a guard.
