= Excuse My Dust (1920 film) =

1920 film by Sam Wood

Excuse My Dust!
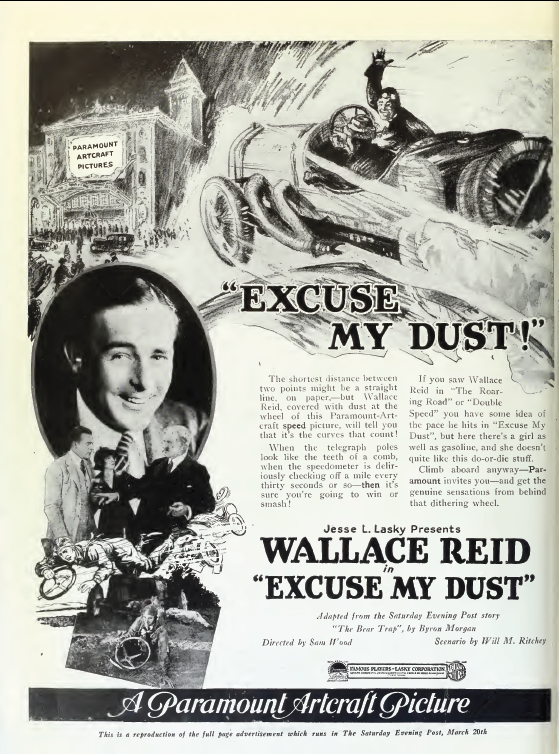
- Ad for the film
- Directed by: Sam Wood
- Written by: Will M. Ritchey (scenario)
- Based on: The Bear Trap; 1919 story in The Saturday Evening Post by Byron Morgan
- Produced by: Adolph Zukor; Jesse L. Lasky
- Starring: Wallace Reid
- Cinematography: Alfred Gilks
- Production company: Famous Players–Lasky
- Distributed by: Paramount Pictures
- Release date: May 21, 1920
- Running time: 5 reels; 4,330 feet
- Country: United States
- Language: Silent (English intertitles)

Excuse My Dust! is a surviving 1920 American silent comedy-drama film produced by Famous Players–Lasky and distributed by Paramount Pictures. It is based upon a Saturday Evening Post short story "The Bear Trap" by Byron Morgan. Sam Wood directed Wallace Reid. Reid's young son, Wallace Jr., makes his first screen appearance here. This film is preserved in the Library of Congress.

== Plot ==
As described in a film magazine, "Toodles" Walton, former automobile racer, has promised his wife Dorothy that he will refrain from speeding. But he gives into temptation and, through the influence of his father-in-law Mr. Ward, the judge deprives him of the right to pilot a car for six months. Troubled times follow Toodles. He nearly runs over and kills his child, his wife leaves him, and his father-in-law's automobile business, of which he is manager, is being plotted against by its competitors. An automobile race from Los Angeles to San Francisco is planned by the competitors in hope of obtaining the plans of Ward's new motor. A midnight auto race, a collision, and an exciting finish puts Toodles in San Francisco, where his child is ill. The competing company fails in its scheme and Toodles' wife forgives him.

== Cast ==
- Wallace Reid as "Toodles" Walton
- Wallace Reid Jr. as "Toodles" Jr.
- Ann Little as Dorothy Ward Walden
- Theodore Roberts as J.D. Ward
- Guy Oliver as Darby
- Otto Brower as Max Henderson
- Tully Marshall as President Mutchler
- Walter Long as Ritz

unbilled

- James Gordon as Griggs
- Jack Herbert as Oldham
- Fred Huntley as Police Magistrate
- Byron Morgan (minor role)
- Will M. Ritchey (minor role)

== Reception ==
Variety called it "a real thriller".

== See also ==
- Wallace Reid filmography
