= Wallace Reid =

American actor (1891–1923)

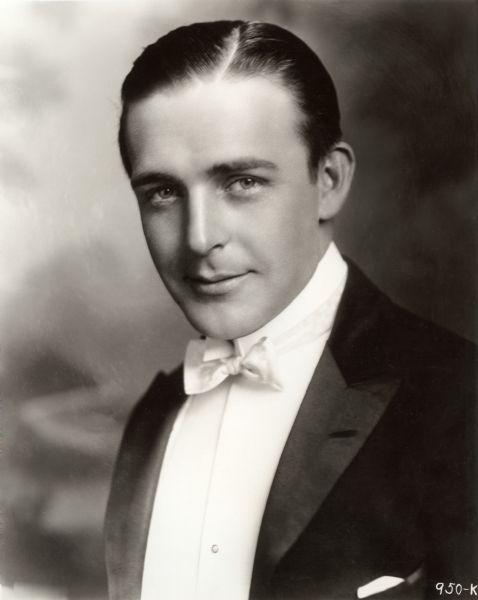
- Reid in 1920
- Born: William Wallace Halleck Reid; April 15, 1891; St. Louis, Missouri, U.S.
- Died: January 18, 1923 (aged 31); Los Angeles, California, U.S.
- Other name: Wally Reid
- Occupations: Actor; singer; race car driver
- Years active: 1910–1923
- Spouse: Dorothy Davenport (m. 1913)
- Children: 2, including Wallace Reid Jr.
- Parent(s): Hal Reid; Bertha Belle Westbrook

Signature
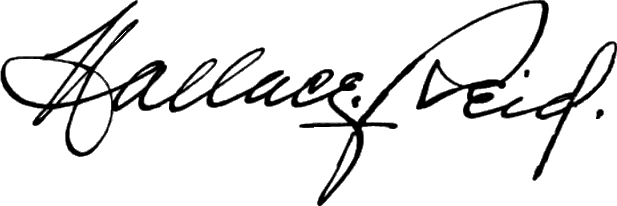

William Wallace Halleck Reid (April 15, 1891 – January 18, 1923) was an American actor in silent film. Referred to as "the screen's most perfect lover", he reached huge popularity from the mid 1910s until his early death. He also had a brief career as a racing driver.

== Early life ==
Reid was born in St. Louis, Missouri, into a show business family. His mother, Bertha Westbrook, was an actress, and his father, James Halleck "Hal" Reid, worked successfully in a variety of theatrical jobs, mainly as playwright and actor, traveling the country. As a boy, Wallace Reid was performing on stage at an early age, but acting was put on hold while he obtained an education at Freehold Military School in Freehold Township, New Jersey. He later graduated from Perkiomen Seminary in Pennsburg, Pennsylvania in 1909.

A gifted all-around athlete, Reid participated in a number of sports while also following an interest in music, learning to play the piano, banjo, drums, and violin. As a teenager, he spent time in Wyoming, where he learned to be an outdoorsman.

== Career ==
Reid was drawn to the burgeoning movie industry by his father, who shifted from the theater to writing films, directing them, and acting in them. In 1910, Reid appeared in his first film, The Phoenix, an adaptation of a Milton Nobles play, filmed at Selig Polyscope Studios in Chicago. Reid used the script from a play his father had written and approached the very successful Vitagraph Studios, hoping to be given the opportunity to direct. Instead, Vitagraph executives capitalized on his sex appeal, and in addition to having him direct, cast him in a major role. Although Reid's good looks and powerful physique made him the perfect ‘matinée idol’, he was equally happy with roles behind the scenes and often worked as a writer, cameraman, and director.

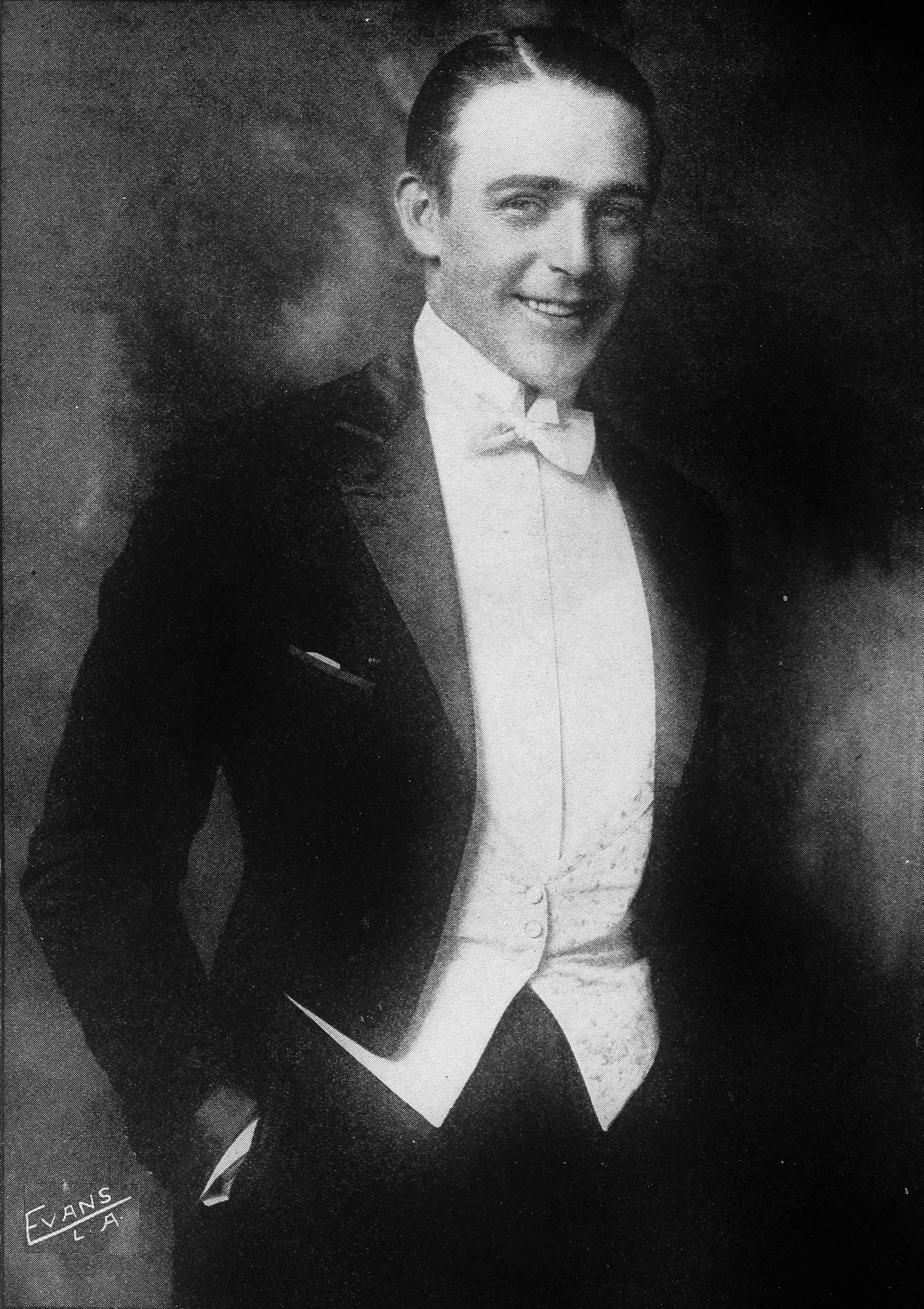
Reid was a favorite of movie-goers. The original caption of this image from Picture-Play Magazine reads, "The only reason why they don’t let Wally play in dress-suit roles all the time is that the casualties among the ladies would soon empty the picture houses. In fact, we feel that we’re toying with the fan hearts even to print this picture." (Note: A reversed version image was also used as a lithograph for the lobby poster of Reid's film The Dub.)

Wallace Reid appeared in several films with his father, and as his career in film flourished, he was soon acting and directing with and for early film mogul Allan Dwan. He was featured as Jeff, the blacksmith, in The Birth of a Nation (1915), and he had an uncredited role in Intolerance (1916), both directed by D. W. Griffith; he worked with leading ladies such as Florence Turner, Gloria Swanson, Lillian Gish, Elsie Ferguson, and Geraldine Farrar, becoming one of Hollywood's major heartthrobs.

Already involved with the creation of more than 100 motion picture shorts, Reid was signed by producer Jesse L. Lasky and starred in over 60 films for Lasky's Famous Players film company, which later became Paramount Pictures. Frequently paired with actress Ann Little, his action-hero role as the dashing race-car driver drew fans to theaters to see his daredevil auto thrillers such as The Roaring Road (1919), Double Speed (1920), Excuse My Dust (1920), and Too Much Speed (1921). Across the Continent, one of his auto-racing films, was chosen as the opening night film for San Francisco's Castro Theatre, which opened on 22 June 1922.

Reid loved racing so much that he even entered a vehicle into the 1922 Indianapolis 500; he eventually withdrew before qualifying.

== Personal life ==
Reid married actress Dorothy Davenport in 1913. The couple had a son, Wallace Reid Jr., born in 1917. They later had a daughter, Betty Mummert, whom they adopted in 1922 as a three-year-old.

Reid was arrested in Portland, Oregon in 1921 for violating Prohibition law.

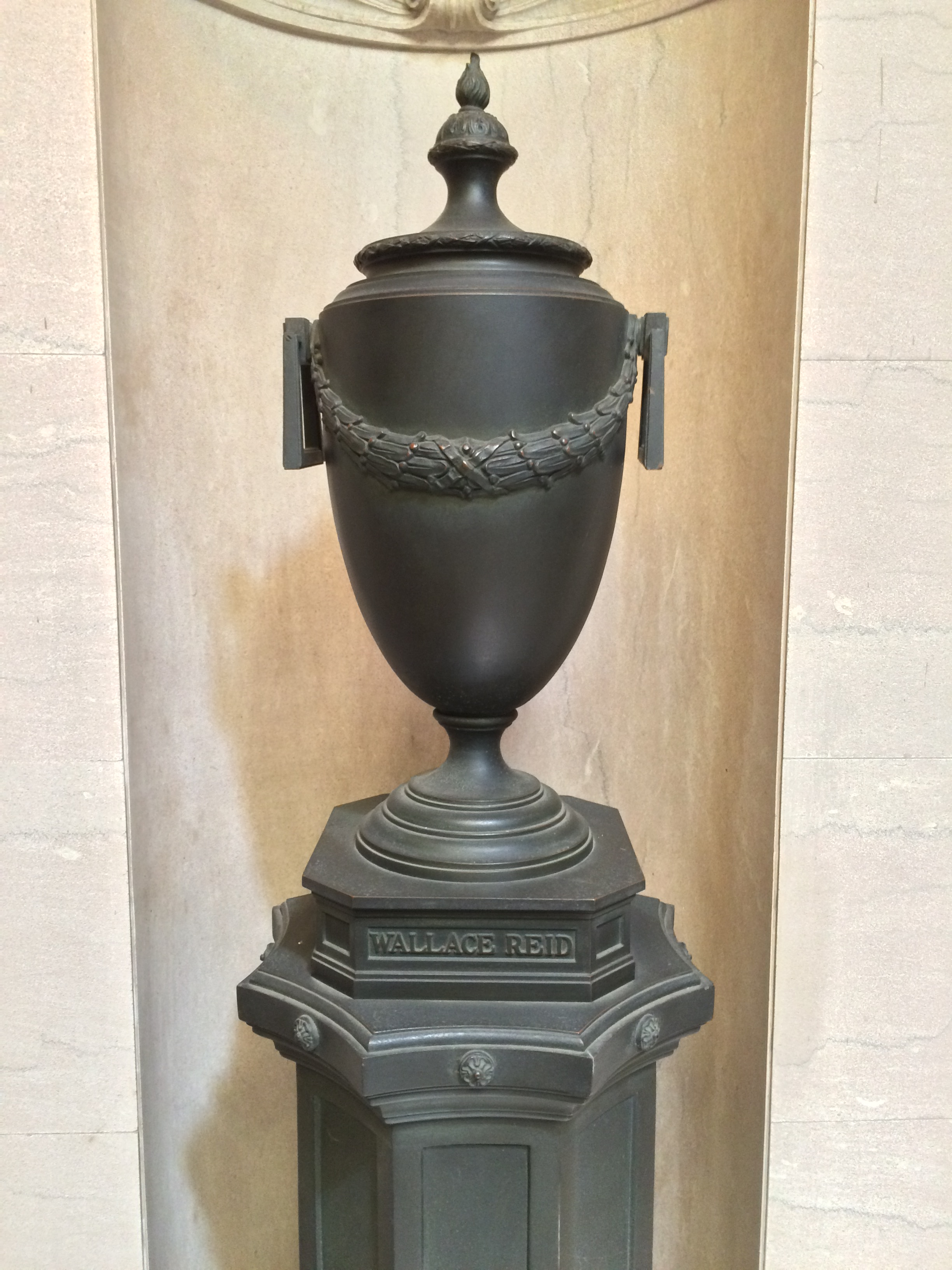
The urn of Wallace Reid, in the Great Mausoleum, Forest Lawn, Glendale, CA

== Death ==
While en route to a location in California during filming of The Valley of the Giants (1919), Reid was injured in a train wreck near Arcata, California, and he needed six stitches to close a 3-inch (8 cm) scalp wound. To continue filming, he was prescribed morphine for relief of his pain, and Reid soon became addicted. He continued working at a frantic pace in films that were growing more physically demanding, while the length of the films increased from short 15–20 minute productions to features lasting up to an hour. Reid's morphine addiction worsened at a time when rehabilitation programs were non-existent.

On October 20, 1922, Reid reportedly collapsed from an undisclosed illness and a "complete nervous breakdown." By that December, an announcement from Will Hays was made that Reid was "facing death" after a month long battle with a sickness, resulting from cutting out drugs and liquor. Reid died from influenza in a sanatorium, aged 31, while attempting to recover from his addiction on January 18, 1923.

Reid was interred in the Azalea Terrace of the Great Mausoleum at Forest Lawn Memorial Park Cemetery in Glendale, California.

His widow, Dorothy Davenport (billed as Mrs. Wallace Reid), co-produced and appeared in Human Wreckage (1923), making a national tour with the film to publicize the dangers of drug addiction.

Wallace Reid's contribution to the movie industry has been recognized with a star on the Hollywood Walk of Fame.

== Popular culture ==
In the biopic Valentino (1977), Reid is portrayed as a bicycle-riding, childish movie star.

The 1980 documentary Hollywood episode "Single Beds and Double Standards" presented Reid's addiction as recalled by people who worked with him: Karl Brown, Henry Hathaway, Gloria Swanson, and stuntman Bob Rose. Later in 2011, this would later be summarised further in the second episode of Paul Merton's Birth of Hollywood.

A biography appeared in 2007, the first work on Reid's life since his mother's personal recollections were published shortly after the actor's death.

A section of the book Hollywood Babylon that gave a biographical sketch of Reid was criticized in 2018 on the You Must Remember This podcast hosted by Karina Longworth.

== Bibliography ==
- Menefee, D.W. (2007). The First Male Stars: Men of the Silent Era. Albany GA: Bear Manor Media.
- Wallace Reid. Col. Selig’s Stories of Movie Life. Chicago, IL: Screenland Publishing Company. April 1923.
- DeMille, C.B. (1959). The Autobiography of Cecil B. DeMille. Jersey: Prentice-Hall.
- Lasky, J.L. (1957). I Blow My Own Horn. New York, NY: Doubleday & Company.
- Smith, Albert E. (1952). Two Reels and a Crank. New York, NY: Doubleday & Company.
- Stern, Seymour (1965). Griffith: The Birth of a Nation part 1. New York, NY: Film Culture.
- Swanson, G. (1980). Swanson on Swanson. New York, NY: Random House.
- "Wallace Reid dies in fight on drugs". The New York Times (obituary). January 19, 1923.
- Cheatham, Maude S. (October 1920). "Wally, the genial". Motion Picture Magazine.
- Fleming, E.J. (2007). Wallace Reid: The life and death of a Hollywood idol. Jefferson, NC: McFarland & Company. ISBN 978-0-7864-7725-8 – via Google Books.
