= The Captive (1915 film) =

1915 film

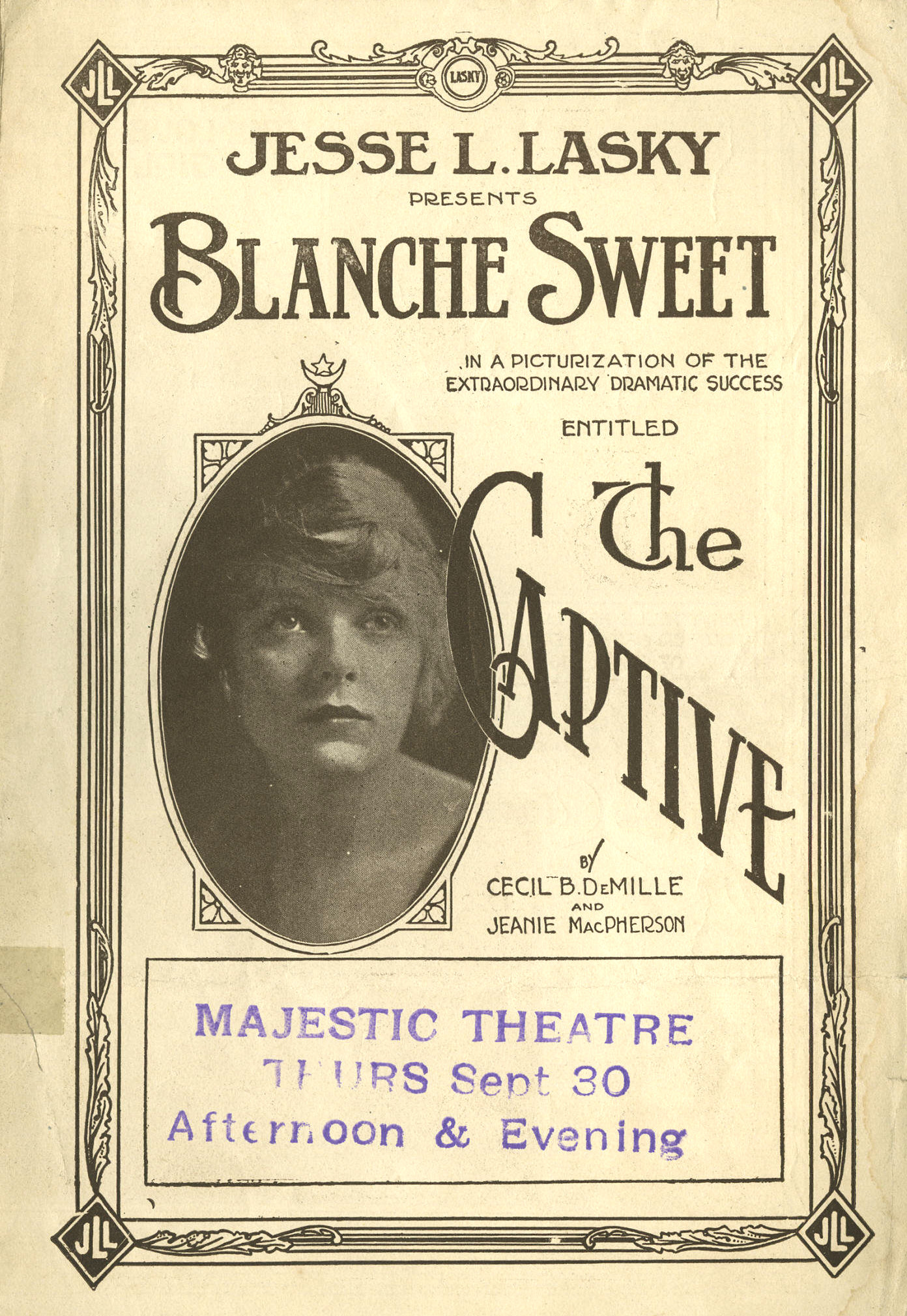
- Front of a pamphlet for the film
- Directed by: Cecil B. DeMille
- Written by: Cecil B. DeMille; Jeanie MacPherson
- Story by: Cecil B. DeMille
- Produced by: Cecil B. DeMille; Jesse L. Lasky
- Starring: Blanche Sweet
- Cinematography: Alvin Wyckoff
- Edited by: Cecil B. DeMille
- Production company: Jesse Lasky Feature Plays
- Distributed by: Paramount Pictures
- Release date: April 22, 1915
- Running time: 50 minutes
- Country: United States
- Languages: Silent; English intertitles
- Budget: $12,153.54
- Box office: $56,074.88

The Captive (1915) by Cecil B. DeMille

The Captive is an American silent war drama film released on April 22, 1915. It was released on five reels. The film was written, directed, edited, and produced by Cecil B. DeMille. Jesse L. Lasky was another producer and Jeanie MacPherson worked with DeMille to write the screenplay. The film is based on a play written by Cecil B. DeMille and Jeanie MacPherson. The Captive grossed over $56,000 on a budget of $12,154. Blanche Sweet stars as Sonia Martinovich, alongside House Peters who stars as Mahmud Hassan. The film details the romantic war-era plight of Sonia and her lover Mahmud.

== Plot ==
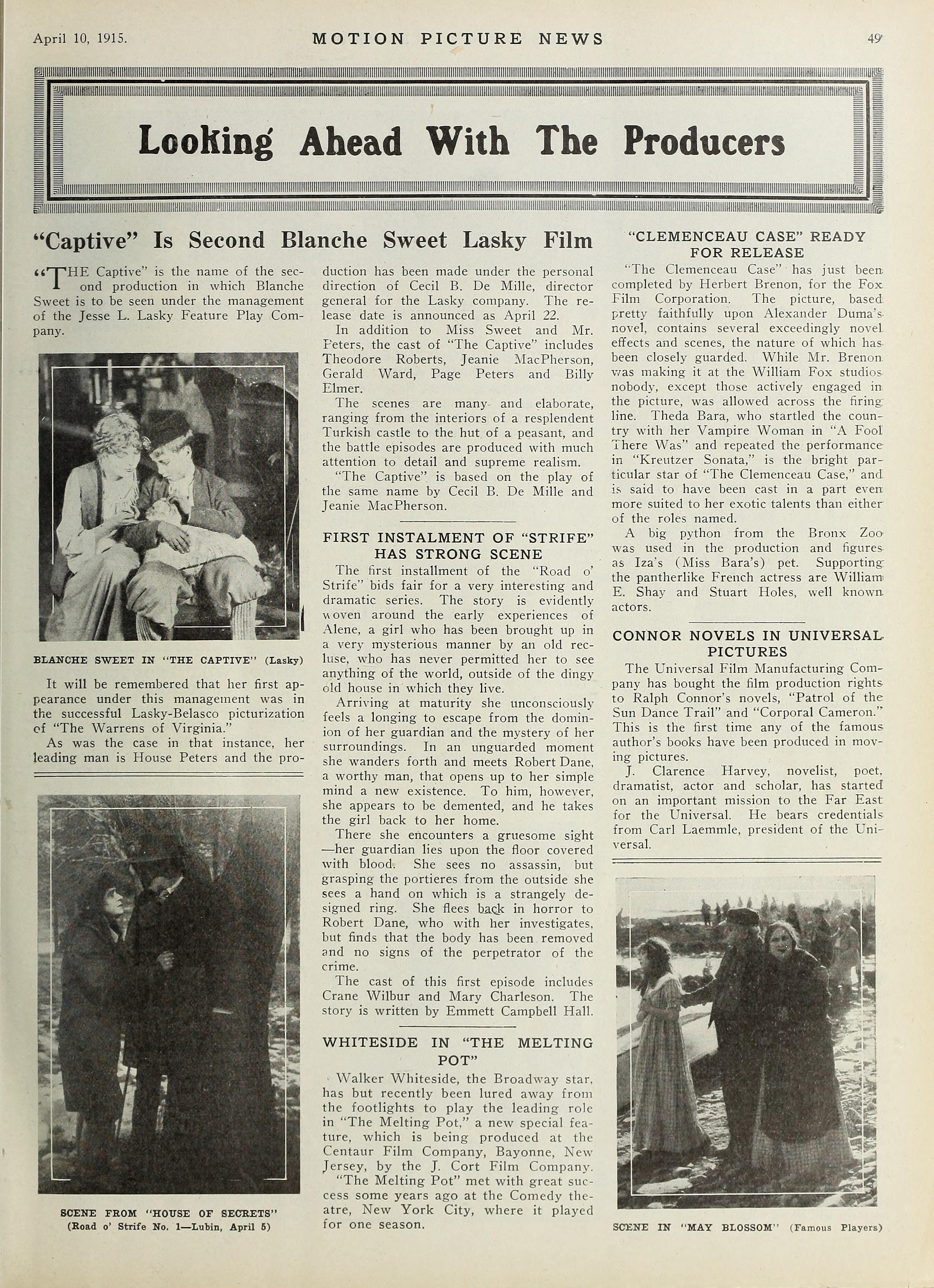
A 1915 news article about the film

The Captive chronicles the life of a young woman named Sonia Martinovitch who lived during the midst of the Balkan Wars. She lives close to the Turkish border on a small farm in Montenegro with her older brother Marko Martinovich and younger brother Milo. Nearby, a Turkish nobleman by the name of Mahmud Hassan lives in a lavish palace. Marko is killed in the Battle of Lüleburgaz, leaving Martinovich and Milo helpless. Subsequently, Hassan is taken prisoner, and assigned to the Martinovich's farm to help with the chores Sonia is unable to complete without her brother.

At first, Sonia holds Hassan captive with the use of her bullwhip and forces him to get water, bake, and plow the fields. Hassan begins to befriend young Milo to alleviate his humiliation and suffering. Gradually, Sonia warms up to him and they fall deeply in love.

The war wages on, and the Ottomans recapture the village where Sonia, Hassan and Milo live. A drunken officer tries to force himself on Martinovich, but she refuses. Fueled by love, Hassan intervenes, despite the fact that the officer is Turkish. When the Ottoman army is driven out of the village, Hassan returns home to find that he has been stripped of his title, his land has been taken, and he has been banished from his homeland, all for thwarting the drunken officer's attack on Sonia. Meanwhile, at the farm, a pack of unruly scavengers have burned the Martinovich family's modest house, forcing them to abandon their home. The siblings meet Hassan on the road, and the lovebirds and Milo walk off to begin a new life together.

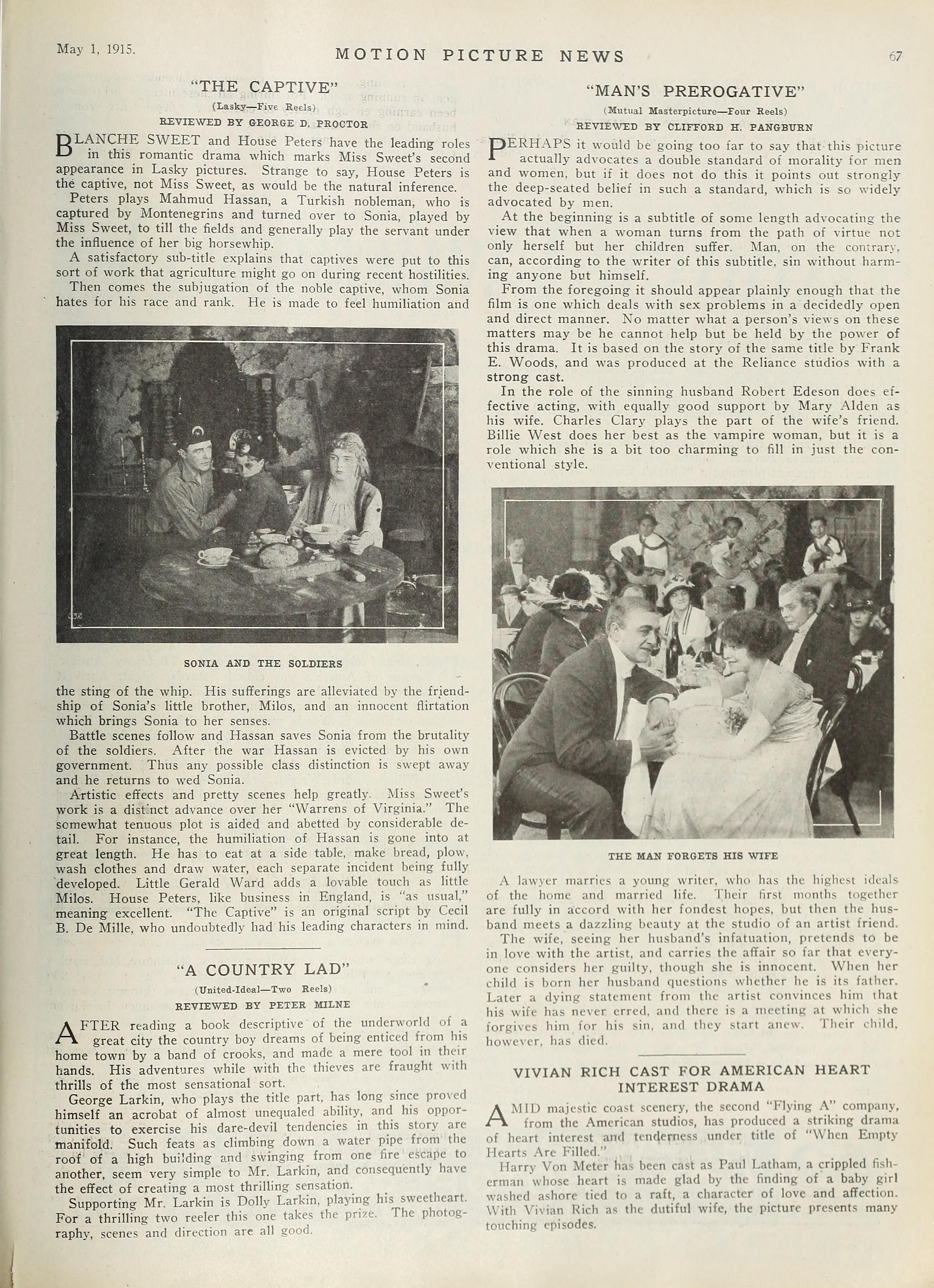
A film review

== Cast ==
- Blanche Sweet as Sonya Martinovich
- House Peters as Muhamud Hassan
- Page Peters as Marko
- Theodore Roberts as The Burgomaster
- Gerald Ward as Milos Martinovich
- Jeanie MacPherson as Milka
- Marjorie Daw
- William Elmer as Turkish Officer
- Tex Driscoll
- Raymond Hatton as Turkish Soldier (uncredited)

== Notable people ==
=== The Famous Players–Lasky Corporation ===
The director, Cecil B. DeMille, and producer, Jesse L. Lasky, are both associated with Famous Players–Lasky Corporation, dubbed “the world’s greatest motion picture enterprise, … [for] it is the organization which has made the motion picture”, its membership included President Adolph Zukor, First Vice President Jesse L. Lasky, Director-General Cecil B. DeMille, Vice Presidents Frank A. Garbott and Walter E. Greene, Treasurer Arthur S. Friend, and Secretary Elek J. Ludvigh. Together, they churned out 731 feature films, and 363 single-reel shorts in conjunction with Paramount. They did this between the years of 1916 and 1919. Blanche Sweet starred in 19 of the films produced by this organization.

=== Blanche Sweet ===
Paramount used Sweet's star power to lure audiences into their late-spring release. They claimed their films were just as great as Broadway stage productions, yet with a never ending season. The praise from the press could partially be due to Sweet's familiarity with her co-star, House Peters, as they worked together on another film called Warrens of Virginia. Warrens of Virginia was directed and produced by the same team. Additionally, Motion Picture News claimed that “Blanche Sweet has scored the greatest success of her entire career in the photodramatization.” The sets and scenes were described as “elaborate … and produced with extreme realism.” DeMille's obsession with realism backfired when an extra, Charles Chandler, was shot and killed by a gun used as a prop on set. Later on, Blanche Sweet confessed that DeMille encouraged extras to use real bullets instead of blanks to create more realistic battle scenes.

Sweet was not a fan of DeMille off screen. She starred in two feature films with DeMille (The Captive and Warrens of Virginia) and had a negative experience during both. She described her time with DeMille as “‘... a terrible time’ ... [she] was terrified of him.” Sweet felt he was strange, but DeMille spun the story to make it sound like he was the one terrified of her. Although Sweet and DeMille didn’t quite click, she had a much better experience with his brother, William C. DeMille, “who, ‘had a more subtle way of doing things.’” She worked with William on three films, The Ragamuffin, The Blacklist, and The Sowers. These films were all released in 1916. DeMille then continued on to direct 70 more films throughout his career.

=== Cecil B. DeMille ===
Jeanie MacPherson acted in several of Cecil B. DeMille films and "became his favorite screenwriter. “Macpherson came to the Lasky studio after being fired from Universal for going over schedule on one of her short productions.” MacPherson and DeMille worked well together, mostly due to their love of melodrama. In this example of their work, it is apparent that The Captive was designed with the intention of reusing costumes from an earlier film called The Unafraid. Both films share the same Eastern European setting and both leading ladies fall in love with their enemies.

== Preservation status ==
The film was thought to be lost until it was rediscovered in 1970 in the Paramount Pictures Vault and later donated to the Library of Congress where the complete 35 mm copy is now held. Boutique label Olive Films released the film onto Blu-ray in 2016, and inserted a new background music track.

== See also ==
- The House That Shadows Built (1931, 20 year anniversary promotional film by Paramount Pictures)
- List of rediscovered films
- Blanche Sweet filmography
- List of film and television accidents
