= For the Defense =

For the Defense may refer to:

- For the Defense (1916 film), an American drama film starring Fannie Ward
- For the Defense (1922 film), an American mystery film featuring Ethel Clayton and Vernon Steele
- For the Defense (1930 film), an American crime/romantic drama film starring William Powell and Kay Francis
