= Hashimura Togo =

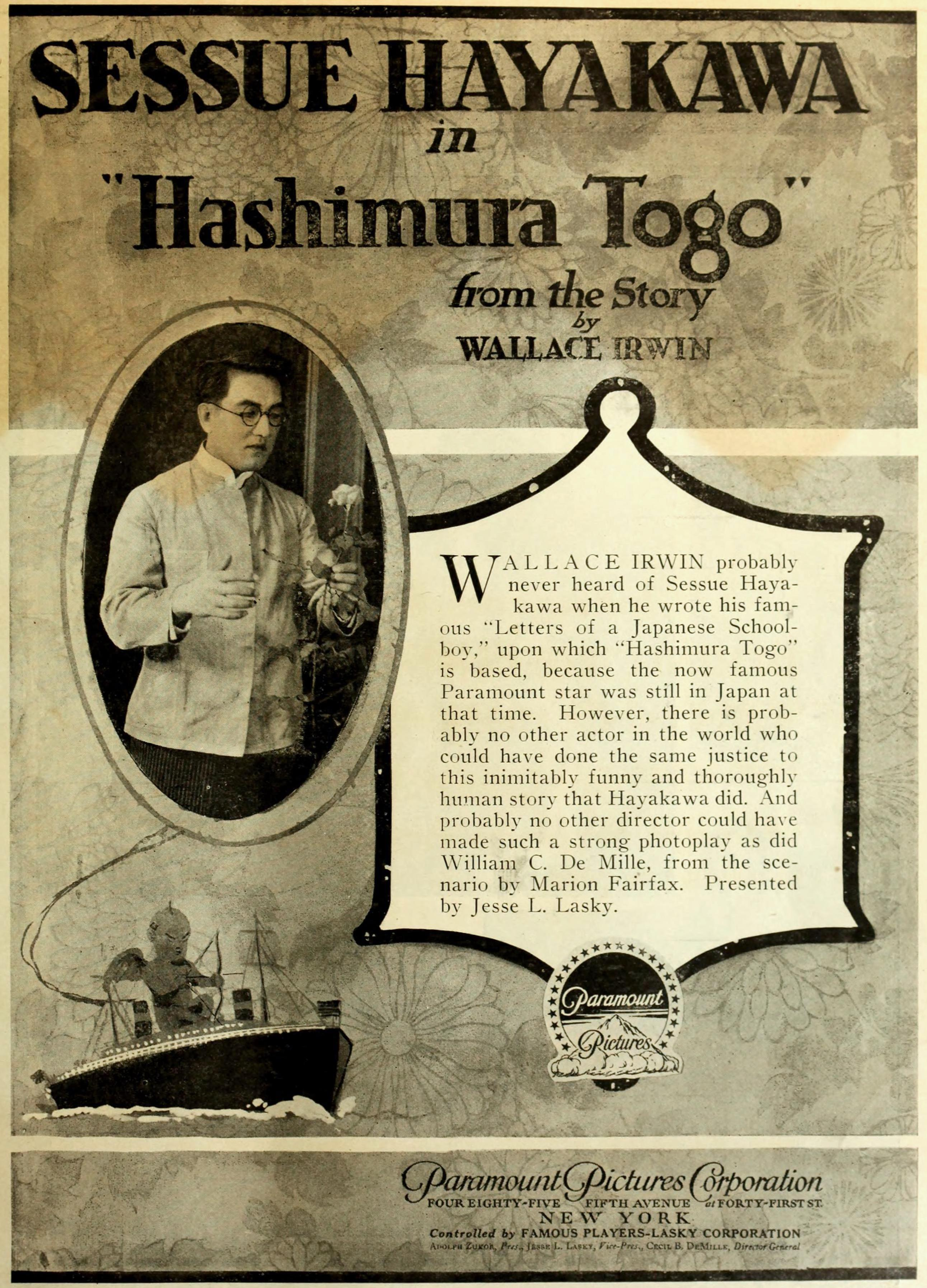
- Magazine advertisement
- Directed by: William C. deMille
- Screenplay by: Marion Fairfax; Wallace Irwin
- Produced by: Jesse L. Lasky
- Starring: Sessue Hayakawa; Florence Vidor; Mabel Van Buren; Walter Long; Tom Forman; Raymond Hatton
- Cinematography: Charles Rosher
- Production company: Jesse L. Lasky Feature Play Company
- Distributed by: Paramount Pictures
- Release date: August 19, 1917
- Running time: 50 minutes
- Country: United States
- Language: Silent (English intertitles)

Hashimura Togo is a 1917 American silent comedy film directed by William C. deMille and written by Marion Fairfax and Wallace Irwin. The film stars Sessue Hayakawa, Florence Vidor, Mabel Van Buren, Walter Long, Tom Forman, and Raymond Hatton. The film was released on August 19, 1917, by Paramount Pictures.

== Plot ==
Hashimura Togo takes responsibility for a problem done by his brother, and is then disowned by his family. He moves to New York and becomes a butler. Hashimura helps to expose a scam to steal money from his employer's daughter. After that he is also cleared of the problem that he was disowned for and heads back to Japan.

== Cast ==
- Sessue Hayakawa as Hashimura Togo
- Florence Vidor as Corinne Reynolds
- Mabel Van Buren as Mrs. Reynolds
- Walter Long as Carlos Anthony
- Tom Forman as Dr. Garland
- Raymond Hatton as Reporter
- Ernest Joy as District Attorney
- Margaret Loomis as O. Noto San
- Kisaburo Kurihara as Awoko
- Horin Konishi as Nichi
