= The Clue =

1915 film by James Neill

- Directed by: James Neill; Frank Reicher
- Screenplay by: Margaret Turnbull
- Produced by: Jesse L. Lasky
- Starring: Blanche Sweet; Gertrude Kellar; Edward MacKay; Sessue Hayakawa; Page Peters; Ernest Joy
- Cinematography: Homer Scott
- Production company: Jesse L. Lasky Feature Play Company
- Distributed by: Paramount Pictures
- Release date: July 8, 1915
- Running time: 50 minutes
- Country: United States
- Language: English

The Clue is a lost 1915 American drama silent film directed by James Neill and Frank Reicher and written by Margaret Turnbull. The film stars Blanche Sweet, Gertrude Kellar, Edward MacKay, Sessue Hayakawa, Page Peters and Ernest Joy. The film was released on July 8, 1915, by Paramount Pictures.

== Plot ==
Two Russian brothers, Count Boris and Alexis Rabourdin, get their hands on the Japanese coastal defense plan and plan to sell the documents to German agents in London. In the US, Alexis plans to marry rich Eve Bertram, who is in love with him. Boris, meanwhile, falls in love with Christine Lesley, a neighbor of Eve, who is also courted by Guy, the brother of the neighbor, an amateur inventor who experiments with explosives.

Guy's valet is actually a Japanese spy who wants to get hold of the explosives and destroy the lost documents. Boris, leaving for London, gives Christine an ancient Russian coin as a souvenir. To show the jealous Guy that she is indifferent to Boris's attentions, Christine attaches the coin to her lover's watch chain.

That night, Alexis' body is discovered. To find the killer, Eve hires an investigator, Williams, who discovers the ancient Russian currency next to the body. Guy actually wrestled with Alexis and is now convinced that he killed him. Christine, to save Guy, agrees to marry Boris in exchange for his silence. Guy plans to commit suicide, but — during a fight — Nogi causes an explosion that kills Boris. The Japanese, seriously injured, confesses that he was the author of Alexis' murder. Christine destroys the documents on the coastal defense plan and Nogi can die, reassured for having completed his mission.

== Cast ==
- Blanche Sweet as Christine Lesley
- Gertrude Kellar as Eve Bertram
- Edward MacKay as Guy Bertram
- Sessue Hayakawa as Nogi
- Page Peters as Alexis Ruloff
- Ernest Joy as Count Boris Ruloff
- William Elmer as Detective Williams
