= A School for Husbands =

1917 film by George Melford

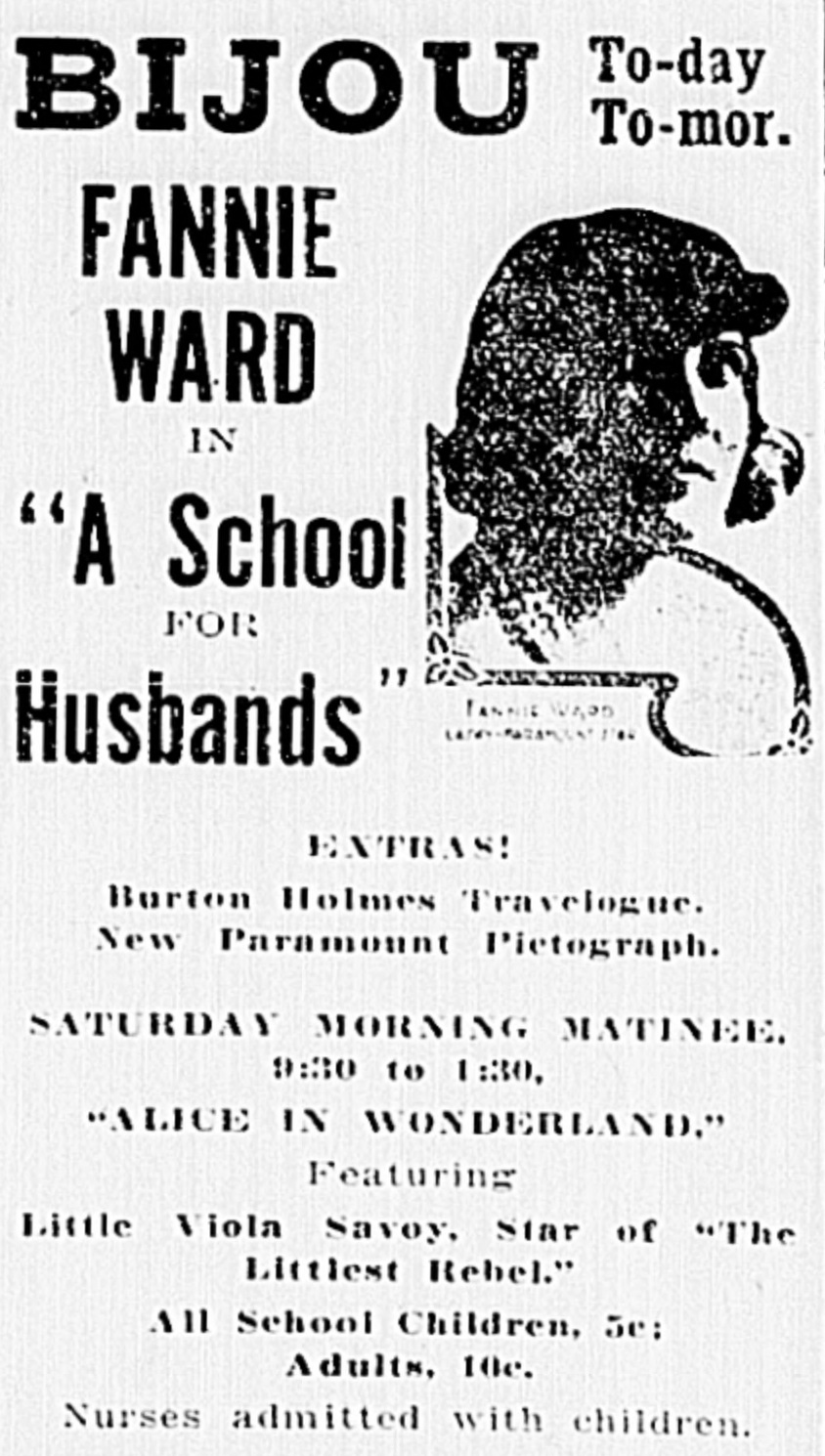
- Newspaper advertisement
- Directed by: George Melford
- Screenplay by: Hugh Stanislaus Stange; Harvey F. Thew
- Produced by: Jesse L. Lasky
- Starring: Fannie Ward; Jack Dean; Edythe Chapman; Frank Elliott; Mabel Van Buren; James Neill
- Cinematography: Percy Hilburn (French)
- Production company: Jesse L. Lasky Feature Play Company
- Distributed by: Paramount Pictures
- Release date: April 5, 1917
- Running time: 50 minutes
- Country: United States
- Language: English

A School for Husbands is a lost 1917 American comedy silent film directed by George Melford, written by Hugh Stanislaus Stange and Harvey F. Thew, and starring Fannie Ward, Jack Dean, Edythe Chapman, Frank Elliott, Mabel Van Buren and James Neill. It was released on April 5, 1917, by Paramount Pictures.

== Plot ==
A woman named Betty is simple and plain; her husband finds that boring and doesn't invite her out. She decides she needs to wear nicer clothes to get the attention of her husband. Suddenly she inherits a large amount of money while at the same time her husband loses all his money in a stock market crash. Her husband doesn't realize she is rich so he goes out to California to sell some of their property to raise some final money. She takes a car out to find him but she is accompanied by another man. When her husband sees this he fights with the man, and Betty's husband mistakenly thinks he kills the other man. When the police and the man who was really killed show up at the same time, Betty's husband realizes he has been acting foolishly. Betty decides to forgive him and they decide to try to give their marriage another fresh try.

== Cast ==
- Fannie Ward as Lady Betty Manners
- Jack Dean as John Manners
- Edythe Chapman as Mrs. Manners
- Frank Elliott as Sir Harry Lovell
- Mabel Van Buren as Mrs. Airlie
- James Neill as Auto Salesman
- Frank Borzage as Hugh Aslam
- Irene Aldwyn as Claire Manners
