= Jack Dean (actor) =

American actor (1874–1950)

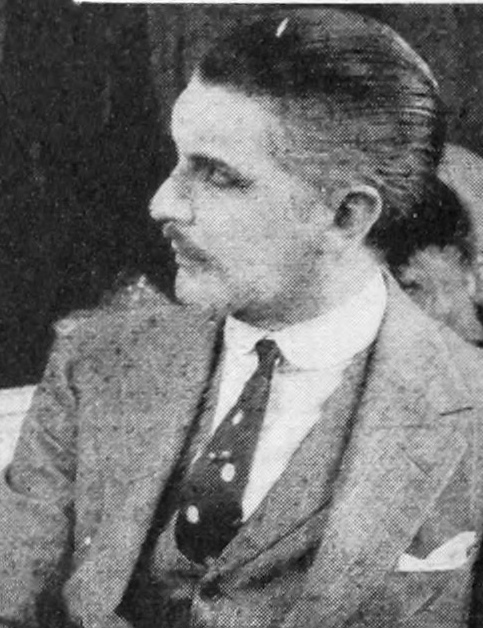
- Dean in A School for Husbands
- Born: John H. Donovan; 1874; Bridgeport, Connecticut, U.S.
- Died: June 23, 1950 (aged 75–76); New York, New York, U.S.
- Occupation(s): Stage and film actor
- Spouse: Fannie Ward (m.1915)

John Wooster Dean (born John H. Donovan, 1874 – June 23, 1950), also known as Jack Dean, was an American actor of stage and film. He married actress Fannie Ward after her divorce from her first husband, and co-starred with her in several films. He was born in Bridgeport, Connecticut in 1874 or Washington in 1875. He died of a heart attack in New York City at his Park Avenue home in 1950.

== Filmography ==
- The Cheat
- The Marriage of Kitty (1915)
- The Years of the Locust (1916)
- Witchcraft (1916 film)
- Each Pearl a Tear (1916)
- A Gutter Magdalene (1916)
- For the Defense (1916)
- Tennessee's Pardner (1916)
- Betty to the Rescue (1917)
- The Winning of Sally Temple (1917)
- On the Level (1917 film)
- The Crystal Gazer (1917)
- Her Strange Wedding (1917)
- Unconquered
- A School for Husbands (1917)
- Sealed Hearts (1919)
