= Old Home Week (disambiguation) =

Old Home Week is an American tradition in New England, where observers return to their childhood homes.

Old Home Week may also refer to:

- Old Home Week (film), a 1925 silent film directed by Victor Heerman
- "Old Home Week," an episode of American action-drama television series The Unit (season 2)
