= Edward MacKay =

American actor and film director

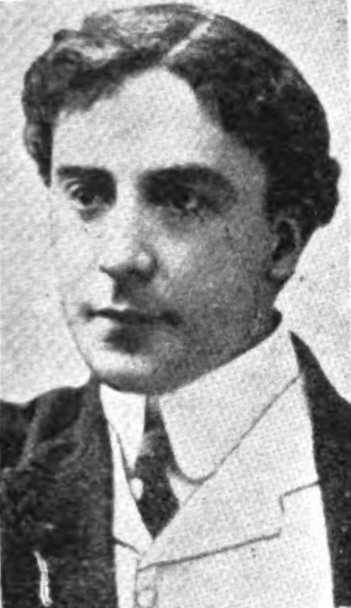
Edward MacKay in 1909

Edward J. Mackay, also noted as Edward MacKay, was an actor on stage and in films in the United States. He also directed films. In 1915 he was a leading man for Jesse L. Lasky's Jesse L. Lasky Feature Play Company. He was married to Julia MacKay in 1900, they separated around 1904, and she filed for divorce in 1906. He was a leading man with the Crescent Stock Company.

Alice Coon Brown MacKay, who had been a drama critic from the Ohio State Journal in Columbus, Ohio was his second wife. She was the daughter of U.S. senator from Utah Arthur Brown.

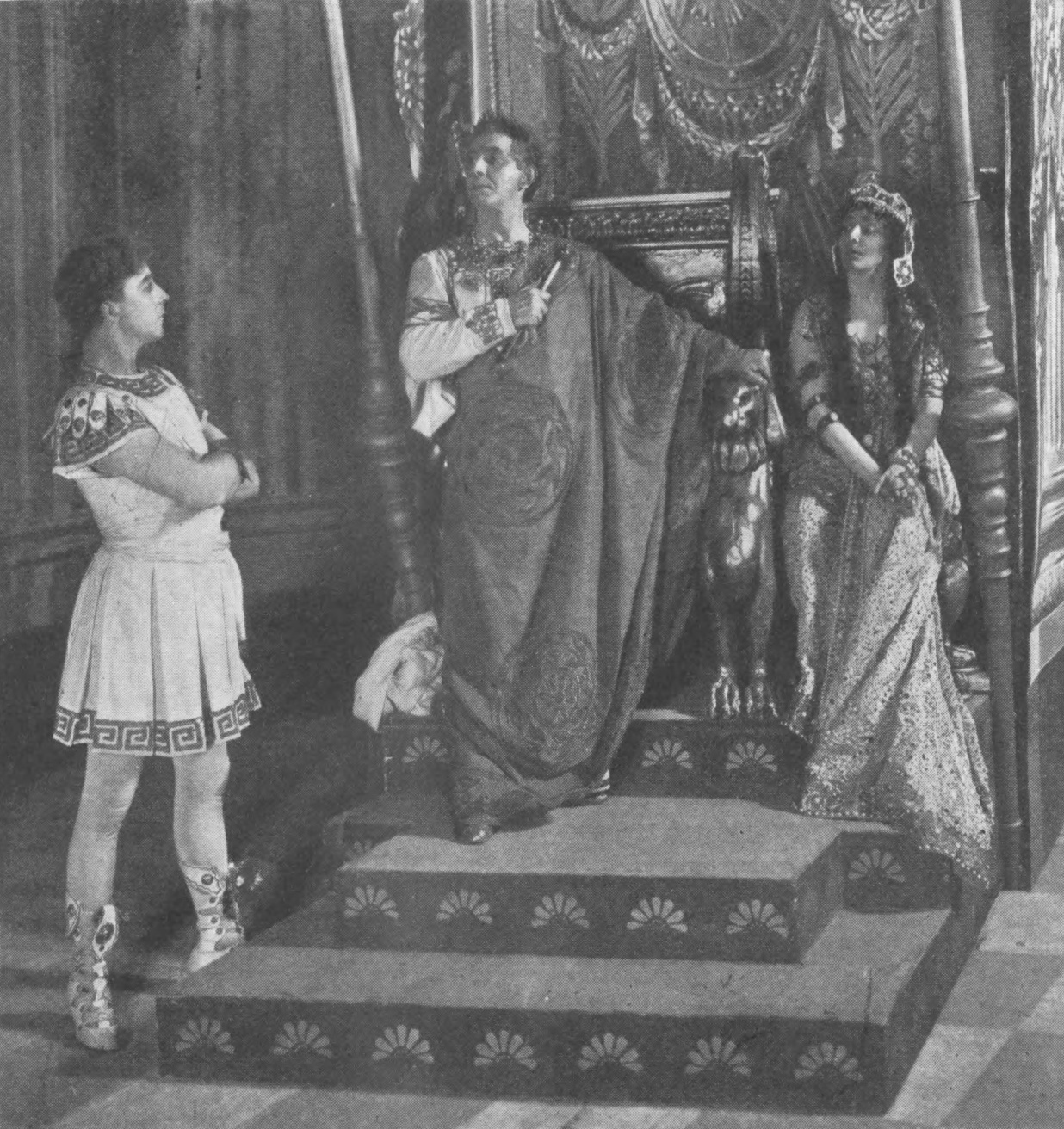
Edward Mackay (left) in The Light Eternal in 1906

He was a member of the Actors' Equity Association. In 1930 he was treasurer of the Actors' Fidelity League.

== Filmography ==
- Clothes (1914) as Richard Burbank
- The Clue (1915) as Guy Bertram
- The Secret Orchard (1915) as Duke of Cluny
- Life or Honor? (1918) as Sidney Holmes
