= Max Figman and Lolita Robertson =

American actors

Max Figman, Lolita Robertson
- Born: March 9, 1866, March 7, 1888; Vienna, Austria, San Francisco
- Died: February 13, 1952, May 1, 1959
- Occupation: Actor
- Years active: 1905-1932, 1912-1923
- Notable work: The Man on the Box, What's His Name, Jack Chanty, The New Adventures of J. Rufus Wallingford

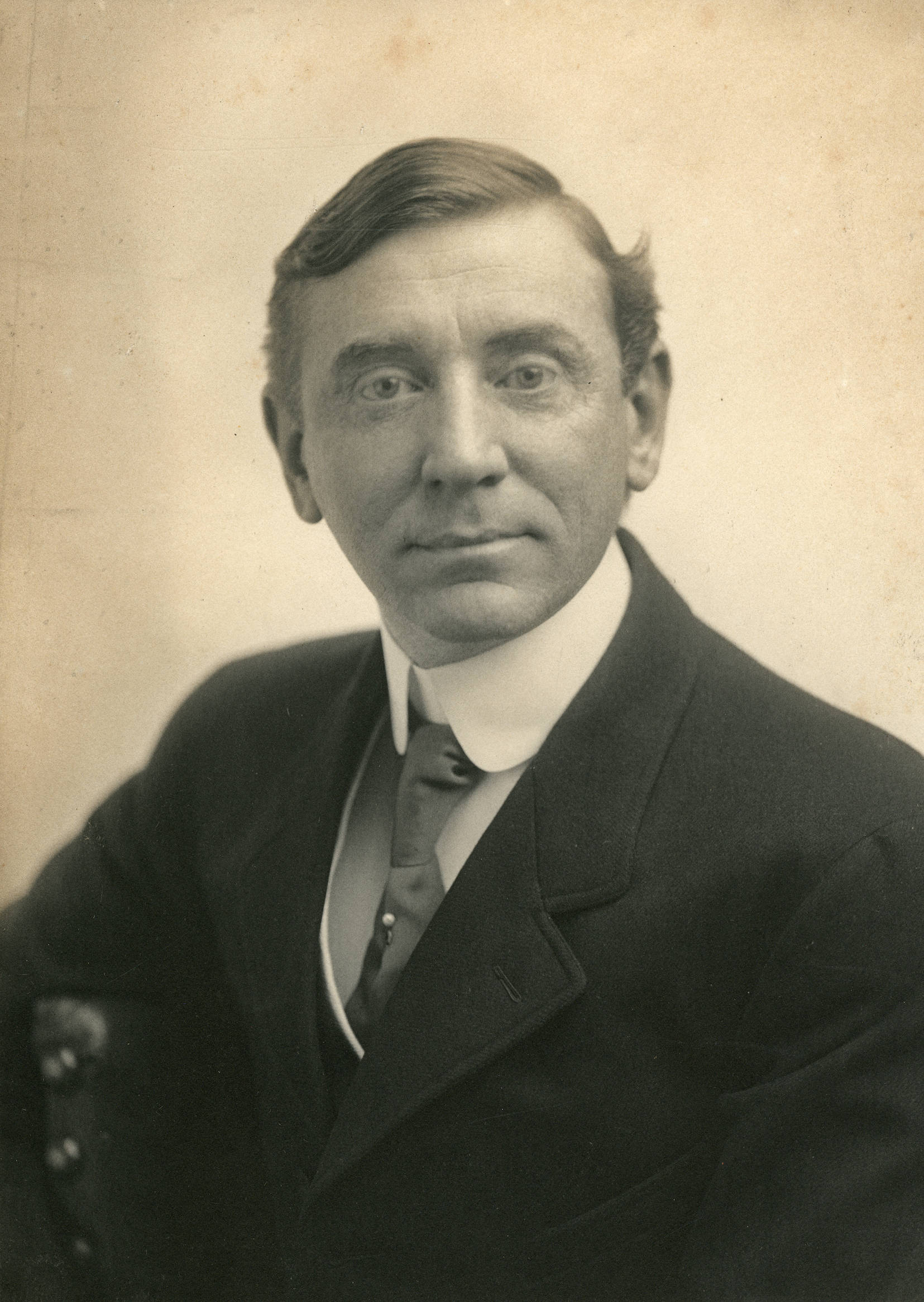
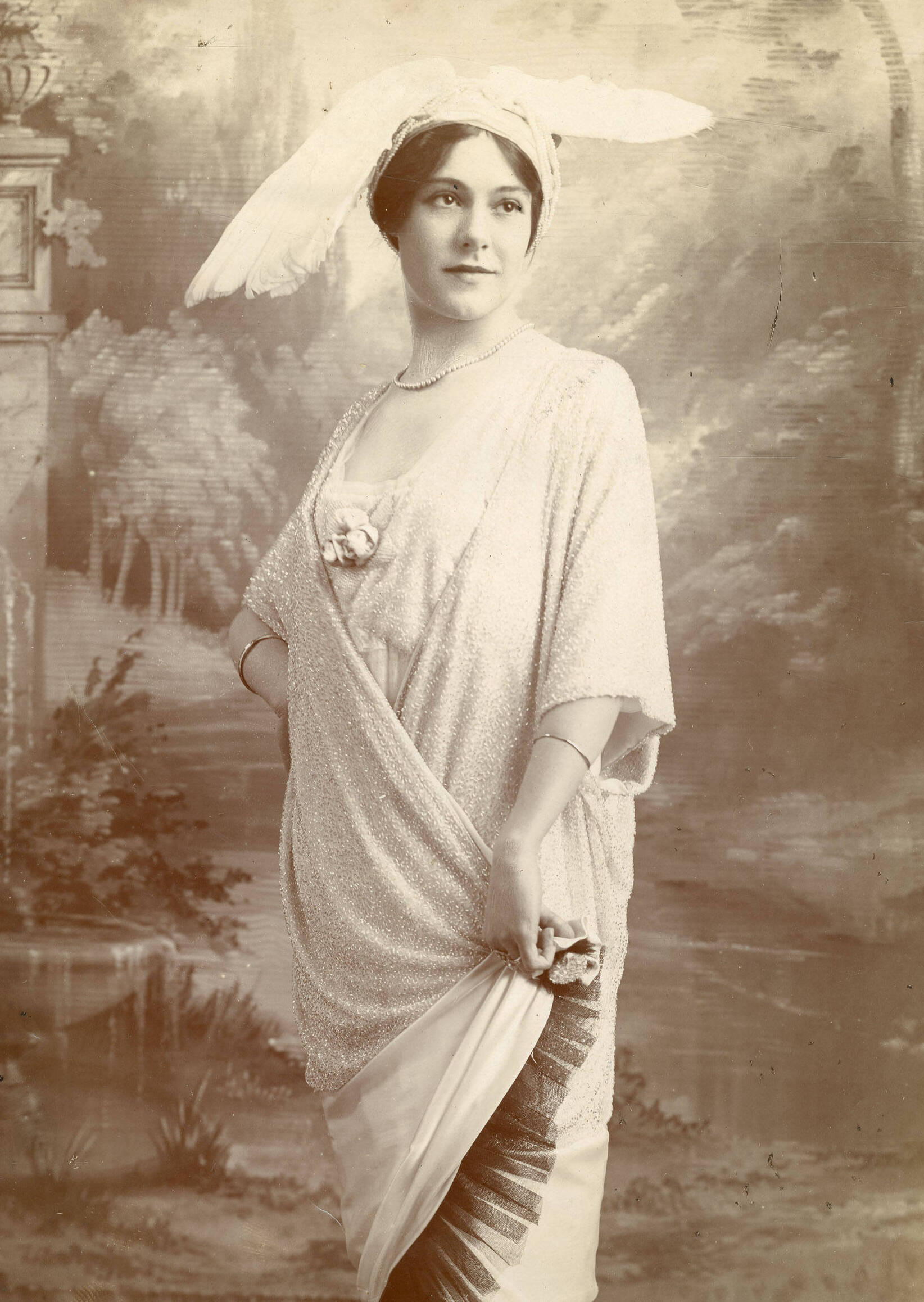

Max Figman (March 9, 1866 – February 13, 1952), born in Vienna, Austria, and Lolita Robertson (March 7, 1888 – May 1, 1959) born in San Francisco, were a husband and wife acting duo who appeared on Broadway and in silent films together. Max was also a director and writer in his stage career. Max was 22 years Lolita's senior but the couple was long married and devoted to each other until Max's death in 1952. Max died on February 13, 1952, in a nursing home in Bayside, Queens, called Edgewater Rest, at the age of 85. They had two children, Max Jr. and Lolita Figman.

Max and Lolita appeared in a hit play Fine Feathers in 1913 co-starring Wilton Lackaye and Robert Edeson. They made a few films with the short-lived Masterpiece Film Manufacturing Company.

The couple sat in on the formation of The Lasky Company in 1914, later to be Paramount Pictures. In silent pictures, the husband and wife often appeared together.

== Max stage career ==
Max made his stage debut at 17 in A Scrap of Paper (1883). He later joined the company of Willie Edouin in Fun in a Photographic Gallery and appeared in four plays with Mrs. Fiske: Miranda of the Balcony, A Doll's House, Hedda Gabler and Mary of Magdala. In 1905–06, he supported Florence Roberts in Ann La Mont and The Strength of the Weak. He became a star in the play version of The Man on the Box, filmed in 1914 by Cecil B. DeMille. From 1909 to 1910, he toured in Mary Jane's Pa and in February 1912 was at Daly's Theatre New York in The Truth Wagon. He began his relationship with Lolita Robertson while in the play Fine Feathers, first at the Cort Theatre, Chicago, in August 1912, and finally in New York at the Astor Theatre in January 1913. His final performance before his death was The DuBarry on Broadway in 1932, playing the role of Louis XV.

== Lolita stage career ==
When the originally cast actress in Fine Feathers, Alice Stone, fell sick, Lolita was offered her role of Jane Reynolds. Eugene Walter asked her to read Alice's part during rehearsal and she was later offered the role. At the time, Max and Lolita had a two-month-old infant, so she initially turned down the offer. After spending time reading the part during rehearsals, she took the role.

== Filmography ==
Max Figman

- The Man on the Box (1914)
- What's His Name (1914)
- The Hoosier Schoolmaster (1914)
- The Truth Wagon (1914)
- Jack Chanty (1915)
- My Best Girl (1915)
- The New Adventures of J. Rufus Wallingford (1915, short)
- The Bungalow Bungle (1915, short)
- Three Rings and a Goat (1915, short)
- A Rheumatic Joint (1915, short)
- The Master Stroke (1915, short)
- The Lilac Splash (1915, short)
- A Trap for Trapp (1915, short)
- A Bang Sun Engine (1915, short)
- A Transaction in Summer Boarders (1915, short)
- Detective Blackie (1915, short)
- Apples and Eggbeaters (1915, short)
- A Stony Deal (1915, short)
- Buying a Bank with Bunk (1915, short)
- The Missing Heir (1915, short)
- Lord Southpaugh (1916, short)
- He Wouldn't Wear Glasses (1916, short)
- Monomania (1917, short)
- Old Home Week (1925)
- It Happened in Paris (1932)

Lolita Robertson

- The Man on the Box (1914)
- What's His Name (1914)
- The Hoosier Schoolmaster (1914)
- The Truth Wagon (1914)
- Jack Chanty (1915)
- The New Adventures of J. Rufus Wallingford (1915, short)
- The Bungalow Bungle (1915, short)
- Three Rings and a Goat (1915, short)
- A Rheumatic Joint (1915, short)
- The Master Stroke (1915, short)
- The Lilac Splash (1915, short)
- A Trap for Trapp (1915, short)
- A Bang Sun Engine (1915, short)
- A Transaction in Summer Boarders (1915, short)
- Detective Blackie (1915, short)
- Apples and Eggbeaters (1915, short)
- A Stony Deal (1915, short)
- Buying a Bank with Bunk (1915, short)
- The Missing Heir (1915, short)
- Lord Southpaugh (1916, short)
- No Mother to Guide Her (1923)
