= Eleanor M. Ingram =

American writer (d. 1921)

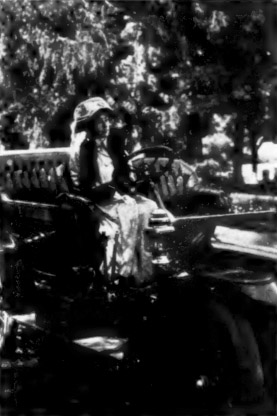
- Ingram around 1911
- Died: March 22, 1921
- Occupations: Novelist and short story writer
- Writing career
- Period: 1902-1921

Eleanor Marie Ingram (d. March 22, 1921) was an early 20th century novelist and short-story writer from New York who published widely in popular fiction magazines. She was particularly known in her own day for her automobile stories, including her novels The Flying Mercury, Stanton Wins, and From the Car Behind. Her most famous novel is The Thing From the Lake, published posthumously, which is considered an early entry in the genre of eldritch horror.

== Personal life ==
Eleanor M. Ingram was born in New York, New York, the daughter of John W. Ingram (1861–1937), a lawyer, and Anna Augusta Shields Ingram. The Ingram family had homes in Grand-View-on-Hudson, New York, and New York City. Her birth year is uncertain as it was given inconsistently in different sources, and her age fluctuated in census records. Her death certificate states she died at age 38, implying she was born in 1882 or 1883. She was listed as being born in 1887 in her 1914 Women's Who's who of America profile, then on November 26, 1886 in her 1920 profile. Gina Collia, in her introduction to The Thing From the Lake, wrote that her mother was listed in a court filing as being married and pregnant in February 1881, and it is possible that Ingram was born that November.

Ingram was an avid spectator of motor racing. Before the publication of her first novel about motor racing, The Flying Mercury, she was a close witness to a fatal crash, after which she said she was taken with the "pulsating nearness of life and death" in racing.

Ingram never married and died in New York City on March 22, 1921 after a long illness, possibly uterine cancer.

== Career ==
Ingram published her first story, The Duke, the Slipper, and Dolores in 1902 in Short Stories. During her lifetime, several of her stories were republished in Europe and translated into Swedish, Danish, and Norwegian. Ingram said that she never wrote stories she did not believe she could sell and claimed that she had never been unable to publish a story, though she also said she could not write on subjects she was uninterested in.

She could read several languages (French, Italian, Spanish, and Portuguese), and a common theme of her writing were protagonists who spoke multiple languages or were interested in foreign literature.

== Bibliography ==
=== Novels ===
- The Game and the Candle (1909), illustrated by P. D. Johnson
- The Flying Mercury (1910)
- Stanton Wins (1911)
- From the Car Behind (1912)
- The Unafraid (1913)

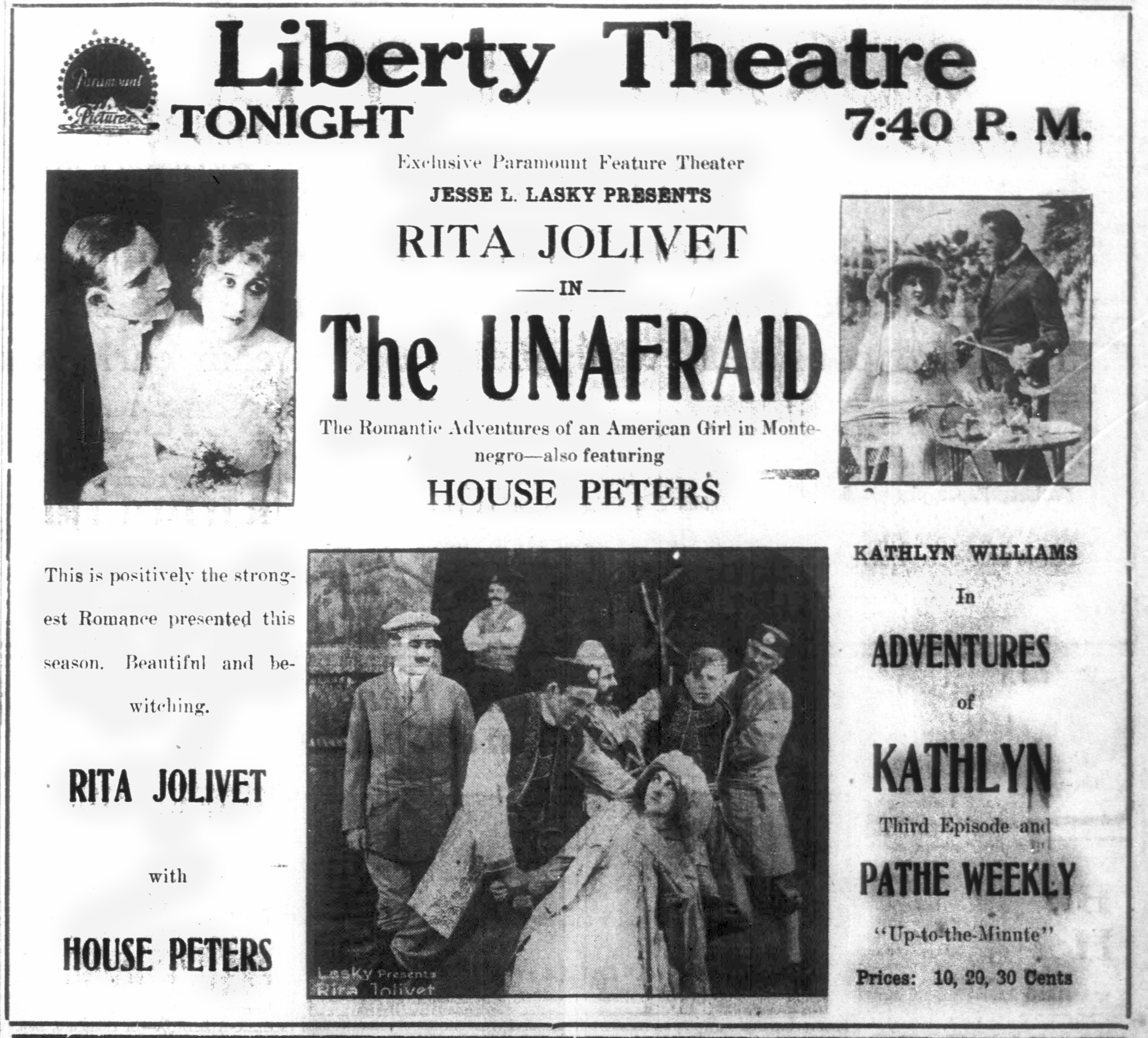
Newspaper advertisement for Liberty Theatre showing of The Unafraid and other films

- A Man's Hearth (1915)
- The Twice American (1917)
- The Thing from the Lake (1921), published posthumously and republished in 2025 with a biographical essay about her

=== Stories ===
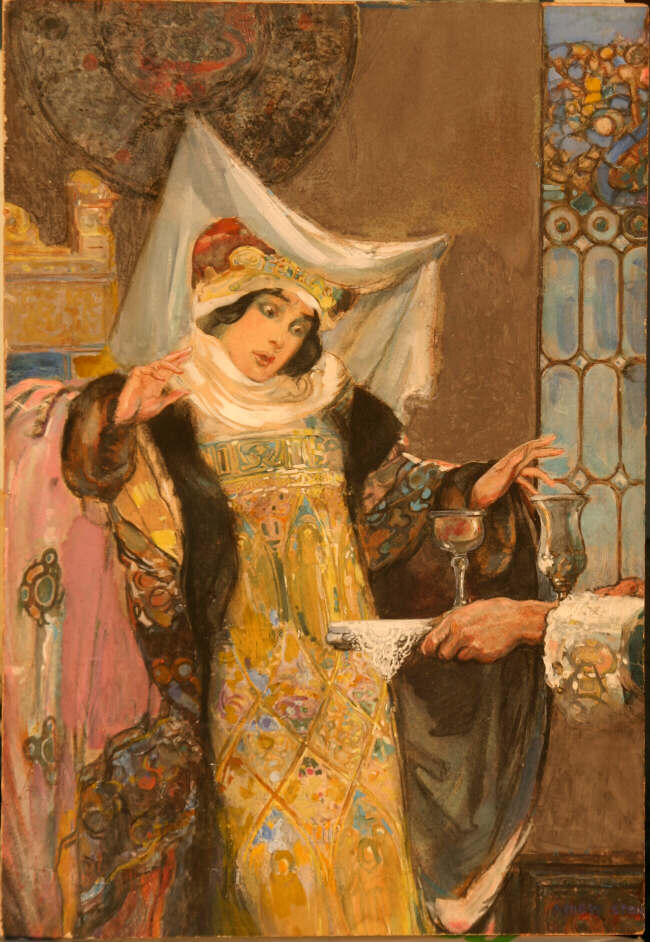
Painting by Modest Stein illustrating Lucifer's Wife

- "The Duke, the Slipper and Dolores" (1902)
- "Eric's Invasion" (1906)
- "The Late Conspiracy" (1906)
- "Two Windows"
- "I Am the Emperor" (1906)
- "The Alien" (1906)
- "The Honor of a Plebeian" (1907)
- "A Balkan Tangle" (1907)
- "Ilaria" (1907)
- "Prince Scheherazade" (1907)
- "The Patricians" (1907)
- "Don Estevan's Honor" (1907)
- "The Subjugation of Rudolph" (1907)
- "The Service of the Temple" (1908)
- "The Harvest of Dreams" (1908)
- "A Galvez with the Gray Eyes" (1908)
- "Not a Sparrow Falleth" (1908)
- "The Unexpected" (1908)
- "Amethyst Windows" (1908)
- "An Aristocrat" (1908)
- "The Unexpected" (1908)
- "The Payment" (1908)
- "His Day" (1909)
- "The Gracious Game" (1909)
- "The Visionaries" (1909)
- "The Lesson" (1909)
- "An American" (1909)
- "The Jesters" (1909)
- "Around the Corner" (1909)
- "A Moroccan Vendetta" (1909)
- "The Last Throw" (1909)
- "Two Who Learned" (1909)
- "The Justice of Guido" (1910)
- "The Heart of Clelia" (1910)
- "The Honor of Valdi" (1910)
- "The Substitute: A Romance of the Automobile" (1910)
- "The Road to Paradise" (1910)
- "The Chauffeur" (1910)
- "Denis of the Course" (1910)
- "The Amazing Adventure" (1910)
- "The Duel" (1910)
- "The Rose Colored Scarf" (1911)
- "Conquered" (1911)
- "His Neighbor's Son" (1912)"
- "By Any Other Name" (1912)
- "The Stolen Woman" (1912)
- "His Play-Day" (1912)
- "Diet" (1912)
- "The Impersonator" (1912)
- "Lady Impossible" (1912)
- "Shifting Sands" (1913)
- "The Highway" (1913)
- "The Whirlpool" (1913)
- "Shifting Sands" (1913)
- "Lucifer's Wife" (1913)
- "The Egerton Standard" (1913)
- "The Spy" (1915)
- "The House of the Little Shoes" (1916)
- "Understanding Adora" (1916)
- "The King's Noon" (1918)
- "A Girl Named Rose"(1919)

== Film adaptations ==
- The Stolen Woman (1913), adapted from her short story of the same name. It starred Alan Hale, Irving Cummings, and Rosemary Theby.
- The Unafraid (1915) was adapted from her novel of the same name. The extant Jesse L. Lasky film stars House Peters and Rita Jolivet, who later survived the sinking of the Lusitania. The story is set in Montenegro. Cecil B. DeMille directed.
- The Rose Colored Scarf (1916), adapted from her short story of the same name. It was directed by William Worthington, and the script was written by Ben Cohn. It starred Herbert Rawlinson, Agnes Vernon, and William Canfield.
- The Amazing Adventure (1917), adapted from her short story of the same name. It was directed by Burton George, the script was written by Harvey Gates, and it starred Roberta Wilson, Charles Perley, "Miss Gillette", and Hayward Mack.
- Little Shoes (1917), adapted from her short story The House of the Little Shoes. It was directed by Arthur Berthelet, and the cast included Henry B. Walthall, Mary Charleson, Mary McAllister, and Ullrich Haupt. The film is presumed to be lost.
