= The Secret Orchard =

1915 film by Frank Reicher

- Directed by: Frank Reicher
- Screenplay by: Agnes and Egerton Castle (novel); Channing Pollock (play); William C. deMille
- Produced by: Jesse L. Lasky
- Starring: Cleo Ridgely; Blanche Sweet; Edward MacKay; Gertrude Kellar; Carlyle Blackwell; Theodore Roberts
- Cinematography: Homer Scott; Walter Stradling
- Production company: Jesse L. Lasky Feature Play Company
- Distributed by: Paramount Pictures
- Release date: August 9, 1915
- Country: United States
- Language: English

The Secret Orchard is a 1915 American drama silent film directed by Frank Reicher and written by Channing Pollock and William C. deMille. The film stars Cleo Ridgely, Blanche Sweet, Edward MacKay, Gertrude Kellar, Carlyle Blackwell and Theodore Roberts. The film was released on August 9, 1915, by Paramount Pictures.

== Cast ==
- Cleo Ridgely as Cora May
- Blanche Sweet as Diane
- Edward MacKay as Duke of Cluny
- Gertrude Kellar as Helen, Duchess of Cluny
- Carlyle Blackwell as Lt. Dodd
- Theodore Roberts as Favereau
- Cynthia Williams as Diane, age four
- Marjorie Daw as Nanette
- Loyola O'Connor as Nanette's mother
- Sydney Deane as Nanette's father

== Preservation ==
The Secret Orchard is considered a lost film.
