= What's His Name =

1914 film

What's His Name?
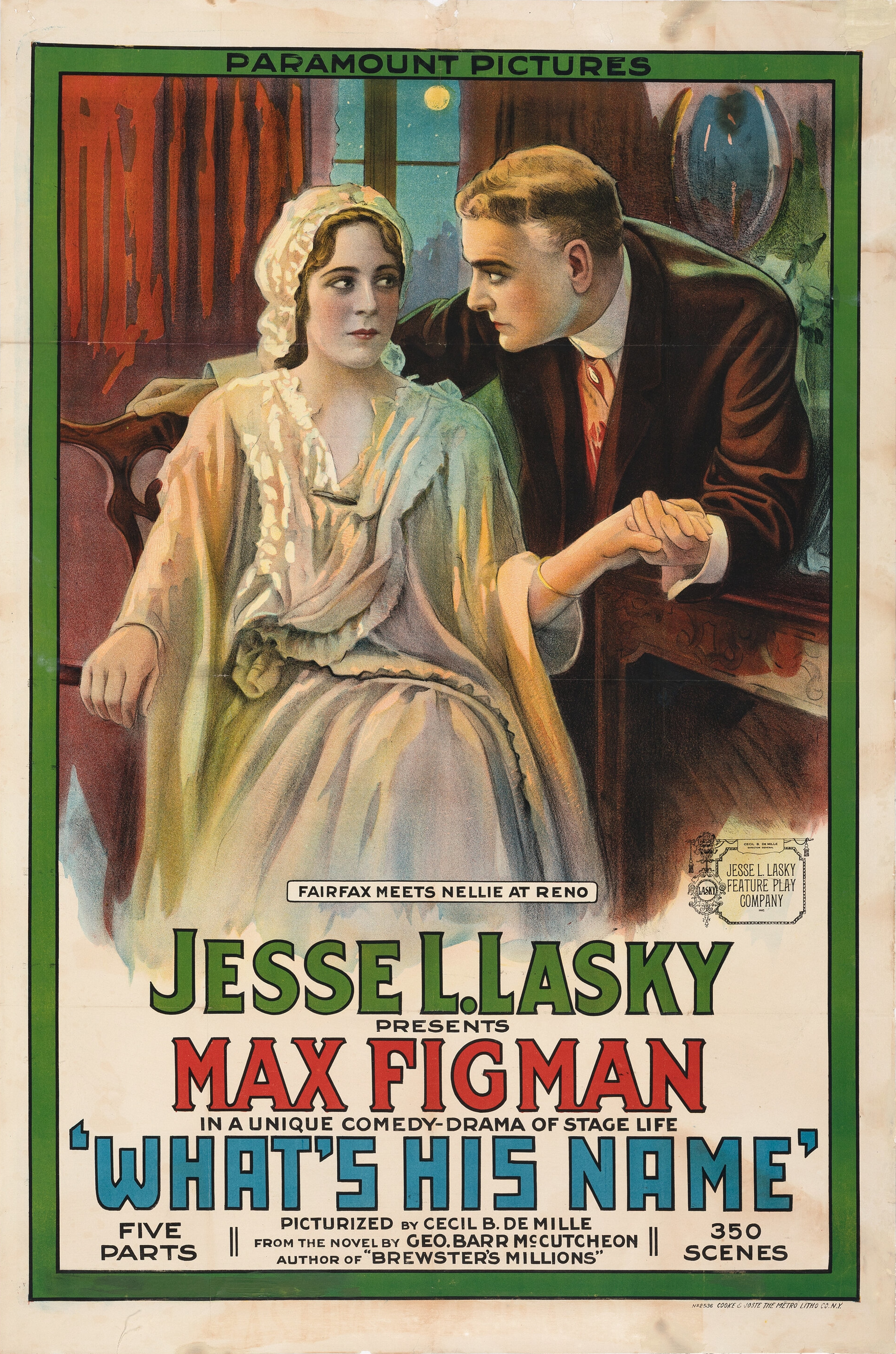
- Directed by: Cecil B. DeMille
- Written by: Cecil B. DeMille; George Barr McCutcheon
- Produced by: Cecil B. DeMille; Jesse L. Lasky
- Starring: Max Figman
- Cinematography: Alvin Wyckoff
- Edited by: Cecil B. DeMille
- Production company: Jesse Lasky Feature Plays
- Distributed by: Paramount Pictures
- Release date: October 22, 1914
- Running time: Five reels
- Country: United States
- Languages: Silent; English intertitles

What's His Name? is a 1914 American comedy-drama film directed by Cecil B. DeMille. A 35mm print of this film exists in the George Eastman Museum film archive.

== Plot ==
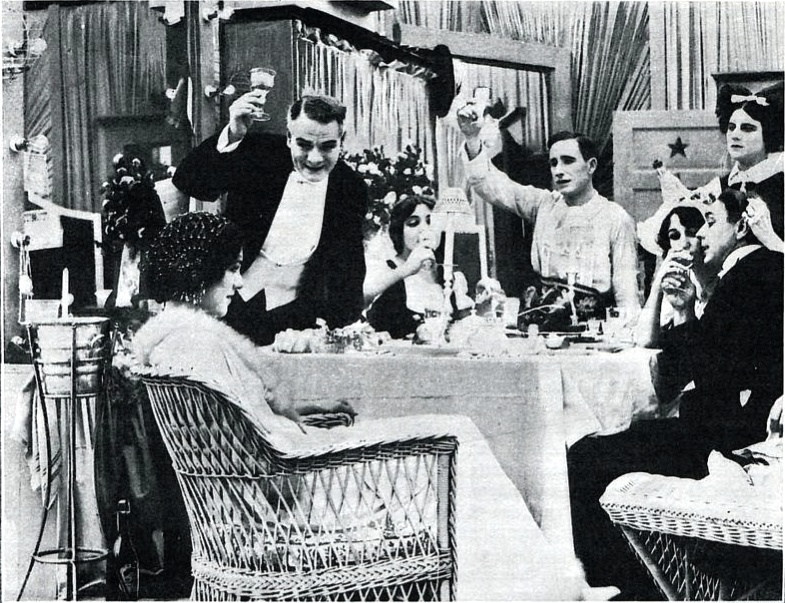
Scene from the film

A baker's daughter, Nellie Duluth, marries a soda fountain operator, Harvey. After a handful of happy years of marriage, Nellie meets a chorus girl passing through their tiny town and becomes friends with her. She offers Nellie a spot in their chorus for 20 dollars a week, and she accepts it. Not wanting to separate from her family, Harvey and their now daughter, Phoebe, come with her to New York to work. Nellie gains popularity rapidly, acquiring the attention of a wealthy millionaire, Fairfax. It is suggested to Nellie by the companies theater manager that she should distance herself from her husband and daughter, so she moves the both of them to a house in Tarrytown, equipped with a maid and a cook. Nellie continues to stay and work in Manhattan, only spending time and visiting her family on Sundays.

After repeatedly getting humiliated, Harvey becomes known as “What’s His Name." Having enough of the treatment and embarrassment, Harvey shows up at a party in Nellie's dressing room wielding a pistol. Fairfax pays Harvey a visit at the Tarrytown home and offers him a large sum of money in exchange for Harvey letting Nellie go. This resulted in Harvey punching Fairfax, which then led to Harvey getting beaten. Being under Fairfax's hold, Nellie stops paying rent on the Tarrytown home and throws her husband and daughter out, leaving them to walk back to their tiny hometown on foot, with nothing but a “God Bless Our Home” wall plaque in hand. During Harvey and Phoebe's month-long trek back home, Nellie travels to Reno, Nevada, to file for divorce. When Phoebe becomes life-threateningly sick, Harvey contacts Nellie. Coming out of Fairfax's charm, she decides to abandon the idea of divorce and go back to her family to care for her daughter.

== Cast ==
- Max Figman as Harvey
- Lolita Robertson as Nellie
- Sydney Deane as Uncle Peter
- Richard L'Estrange as Best Man
- Merta Carpenter as Friend Of Nellie's
- Fred Montague as Fairfax
- Theodore Roberts as Character Man
- Cecilia de Mille as Phoebe, The Child
