= The Cheat (1915 film) =

1915 film by Cecil B. DeMille

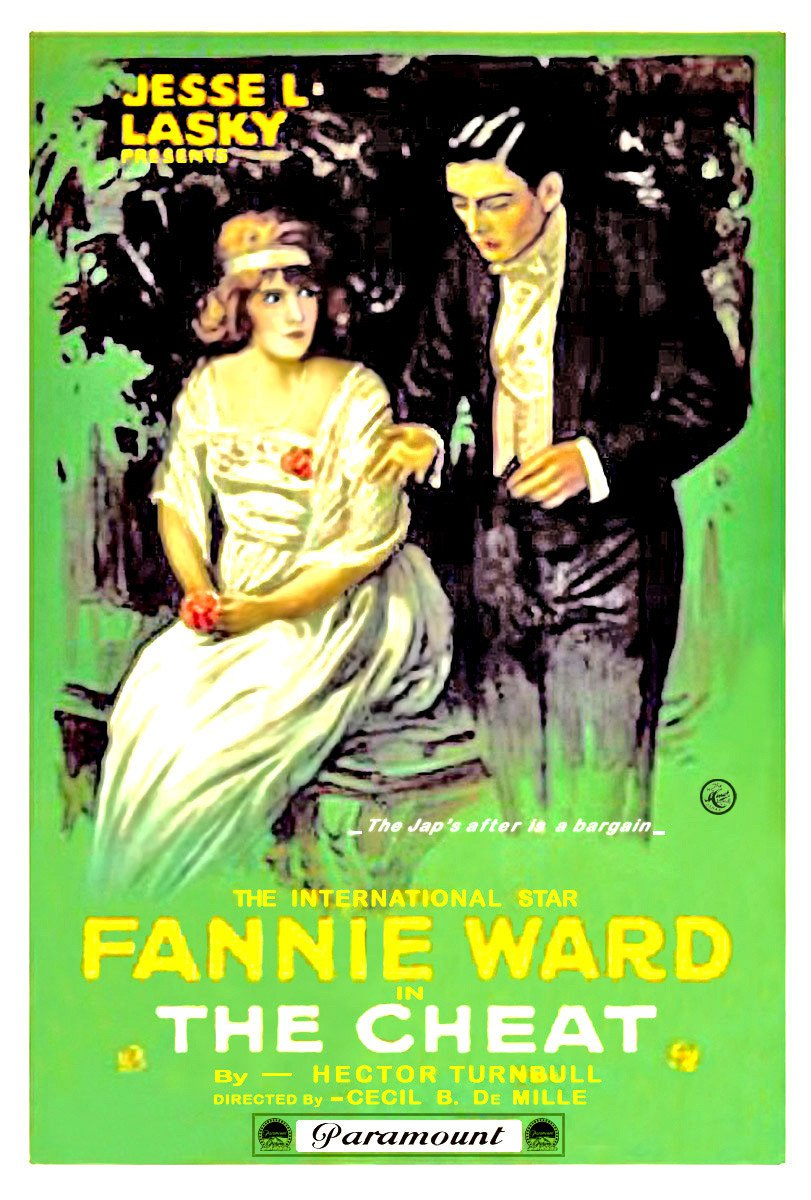
- Directed by: Cecil B. DeMille (uncredited)
- Written by: Hector Turnbull; Jeanie MacPherson
- Produced by: Cecil B. DeMille; Jesse L. Lasky
- Starring: Sessue Hayakawa; Fannie Ward; Jack Dean
- Cinematography: Alvin Wyckoff
- Edited by: Cecil B. DeMille
- Music by: Robert Israel (1994)
- Production company: Jesse Lasky Feature Plays
- Distributed by: Paramount Pictures
- Release dates: December 13, 1915 (initial release); November 24, 1918 (re-release)
- Running time: 59 minutes
- Country: United States
- Languages: Silent; English intertitles
- Budget: $17,311
- Box office: $96,389 (domestic) $40,975 (foreign)

The Cheat (full film, 1918 re-issue)

The Cheat is a 1915 American silent drama film directed by Cecil B. DeMille, starring Fannie Ward, Sessue Hayakawa, and Jack Dean, Ward's real-life husband.

== Plot ==
Edith Hardy is a spoiled society woman who continues to buy expensive clothes even when her husband, Richard, tells her all his money is sunk into a stock speculation and he can't pay her bills until the stock goes up. She even delays paying her maid her wages, and the embarrassed Richard must do so instead. Edith is also the treasurer for the local Red Cross fund drive for Belgian refugees, which holds a gala dance at the home of Hishuru Tori, a rich Japanese ivory merchant. He is an elegant and dangerously sexy man, to whom Edith seems somewhat drawn; he shows her his roomful of treasures, and stamps one of them with a branding iron to show that it belongs to him.

A society friend of the Hardys tells Edith that Richard's speculation will not be profitable and he knows a better one; he then offers to double her money in one day if she gives it to him to invest in the suggested enterprise. Edith, wanting to live lavishly and unwilling to wait for Richard to realize his speculation, takes the $10,000 the Red Cross has raised from her bedroom safe and gives it to the society friend.

The next day, however, her horrified friend tells her his tip was worthless and her money is completely lost. The Red Cross ladies have scheduled the handover of the money to the refugee fund for the day after that. Edith goes to Tori to beg for a loan to cover the money, and he agrees to write her a check in return for implied sexual favors the next day. She reluctantly agrees to this, takes his check and is able to give the money to the Red Cross. Richard then elatedly announces that his investments have paid off and they are very rich. Edith asks him for $10,000, saying it is for a bridge debt, and he writes her a check for the amount with no reproof.

She takes it to Tori, but he says she cannot buy her way out of their bargain. When she struggles against his advances, he takes his heated brand and uses it to brand Edith on the shoulder. In the ensuing struggle, she finds a gun on the floor and shoots him. She runs away just as Richard, hearing the struggle, bursts into the house. He finds Tori, who is wounded in the shoulder but alive, and the check he wrote to his wife on the floor. When Tori's servants call the police, Richard declares that he shot him, and Tori does not dispute this.

Edith pleads with Tori not to press charges, but he refuses to spare Richard. She visits Richard in his jail cell and confesses everything, and he orders her not to tell anyone else and let him take the blame. At the trial, which draws a huge crowd of spectators, both Richard and Tori, his arm in a sling, testify that he was the shooter, but will not say why. The jury finds Richard guilty.

This is too much for Edith, and she rushes to the witness stand and shouts that she shot Tori, "and this is my defense". She bares her shoulder and shows everyone in the courtroom the brand. Infuriated male spectators rush to the front, clearly intending to lynch Tori. The judge protects him and manages to hold them off. He then sets aside the verdict, and the prosecutor withdraws the charges. Richard lovingly and protectively leads the chastened Edith from the courtroom.

== Cast ==
- Fannie Ward as Edith Hardy
- Sessue Hayakawa as Hishuru Tori (original release) / Haka Arakau (1918 re-release)
- Jack Dean as Richard Hardy
- James Neill as Jones
- Yutaka Abe as Tori's Valet
- Dana Ong as District Attorney
- Hazel Childers as Mrs. Reynolds
- Arthur H. Williams as Courtroom Judge (as Judge Arthur H. Williams)
- Raymond Hatton as Courtroom Spectator (uncredited)
- Dick La Reno as Courtroom Spectator (uncredited)
- Lucien Littlefield as Hardy's Secretary (uncredited)

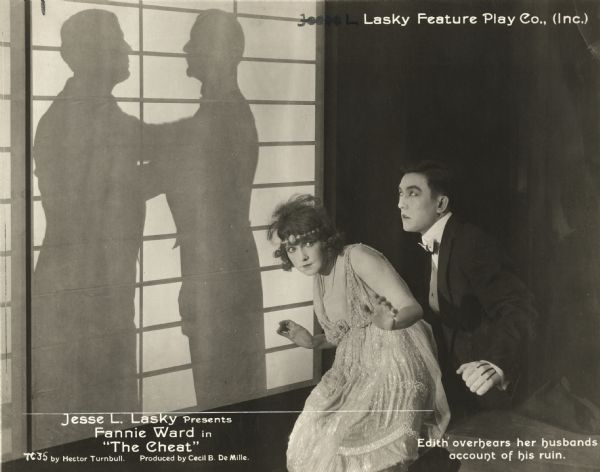
Edith Hardy (Fannie Ward) and Hishuru Tori (Sessue Hayakawa) in The Cheat

== Production and release ==
The Cheat featured art direction by Wilfred Buckland.

Upon its release, The Cheat was both a critical and commercial success. The film's budget was $17,311. It grossed $96,389 domestically and $40,975 in the overseas market. According to Scott Eyman's Empire of Dreams: The Epic Life of Cecil B. DeMille, the film cost $16,540 to make, and grossed $137,364.

Upon its release, the character of Hishuru Tori was described as a Japanese ivory merchant. Japanese Americans protested against the film for portraying a Japanese person as sinister. In particular, a Japanese newspaper in Los Angeles, Rafu Shimpo, waged a campaign against the film and heavily criticized Hayakawa's appearance. When the film was re-released in 1918, the character of Hishuru was renamed "Haka Arakau" and described in the title cards as a "Burmese ivory king". The change of the character's name and nationality were done because Japan was an American ally at the time. Robert Birchard, author of the book Cecil B. DeMille's Hollywood, surmised that the character's nationality was changed to Burmese because there were "not enough Burmese in the country to raise a credible protest." Despite the changes, the film was banned in the United Kingdom and was never released in Japan. The brand used by Hayakawa's character depicts a torii gate, symbolizing his original surname.

The film inspired French film critics to coin the term photogenie to specify cinema's medium-specific qualities and was filmed with innovative usage of lighting that helped raise awareness of film as a serious art form.

== Critical reception ==
Moving Picture World gave it a glowing review:

Space bids me be brief. I cannot, however, omit words of unqualified praise for Fanny Ward, whose impersonation of the social butterfly with the singed wings was a masterly performance. The lighting effects must be mentioned, too. They are beyond all praise in their art, their daring and their originality. There are those deft and subtle touches that we find all the Lasky pictures possess--only here they crowd upon one another. What a delicate but powerful effect was the omission of the bars in the prison scene. The shadow of the bars, the sombre light, the bent head of the prisoner silhouetted against the bare wall--this is but one of the numerous happy touches. The Cheat is worth advertising to the limit. It is one feature in a hundred.

== Accolades ==
The film was nominated for the American Film Institute's 2001 list AFI's 100 Years...100 Thrills. It was also nominated in the 2007 AFI's 100 Years...100 Movies (10th Anniversary Edition) list.

== Remakes and adaptations ==
The film was remade in 1923, with George Fitzmaurice as director and Pola Negri and Jack Holt starring. In 1931, Paramount again remade The Cheat, with Broadway mogul George Abbott as director and starring Tallulah Bankhead.

The Cheat was also remade in France as Forfaiture (1937) directed by Marcel L'Herbier. This version, however, makes significant changes to the original story, even though Hayakawa was cast once again as the sexually predatory Asian man.

An operatic adaptation of the story, La Forfaiture, with music by Camille Erlanger and a libretto by André de Lorde and Paul Milliet, premiered at the Opéra-Comique in 1921. The first opera to be based on a film scenario, it was not a success, playing only three times.

== Preservation and availability ==
In 1993, the film was selected for preservation in the United States National Film Registry.

Copies of The Cheat are held by:

- George Eastman House on 35 mm movie film. This surviving version is the 1918 re-release footage which includes changes to the Hishuru Tori character.
- Cinematheque Royale de Belgique
- Cineteca Del Friuli in Gemona on 16 mm film
- Library of Congress on 35 mm film and Laserdisc
- British Film Institute
- UCLA Film and Television Archive on 35 mm film and video
- Academy Film Archive on video
- Harvard Film Archive on 35 mm film

The Cheat, which is now in public domain, was released on DVD in 2002 with another DeMille film Manslaughter (1922) by Kino International.
