= A Gutter Magdalene =

1916 film by George Melford

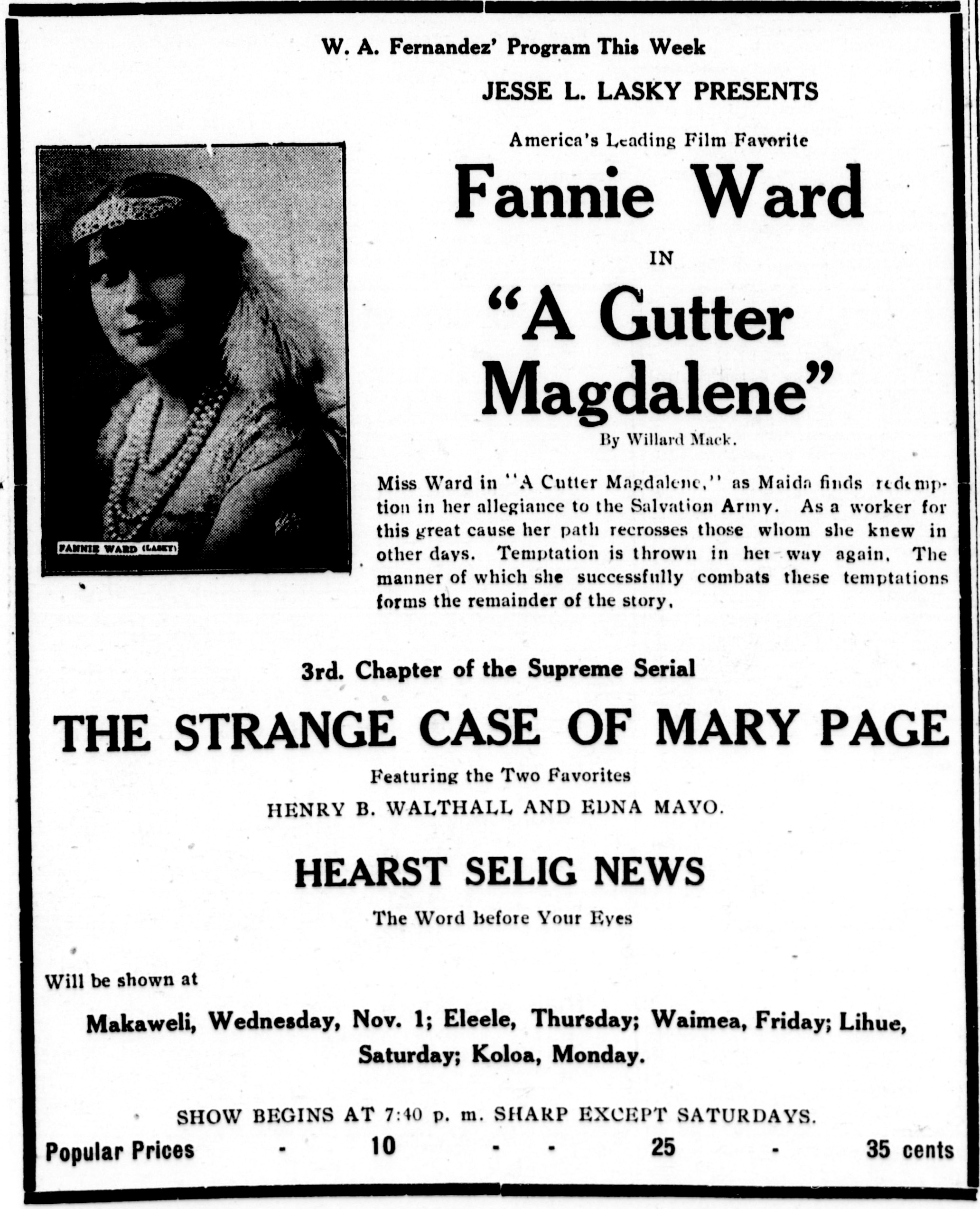
- Newspaper advertisement
- Directed by: George Melford
- Screenplay by: Clinton Stagg
- Story by: Willard Mack
- Produced by: Jesse L. Lasky
- Starring: Fannie Ward
- Cinematography: Percy Hilburn (French)
- Production company: Jesse L. Lasky Feature Play Company
- Distributed by: Paramount Pictures
- Release date: June 4, 1916
- Running time: 50 minutes
- Country: United States
- Language: English

A Gutter Magdalene is a lost 1916 American drama silent film directed by George Melford and written by Clinton Stagg. The film stars Fannie Ward, Jack Dean, Charles West, William Elmer, Gertrude Kellar and Ronald Bradbury. The film was released on June 4, 1916, by Paramount Pictures.

== Plot ==
Maida Carrington goes to a city with a gambler but runs away after she witnesses the gambler steal money from Steve Boyce. The woman takes a job with the Salvation Army and after that she meets Steve again because he now has no money and needs help. They fall in love and Steve asks her to marry him, but Maida thinks she isn't a good match for him because of her past association with the gambler. She goes and finds the gambler and tries to get him to return the money to Steve. He refuses and they struggle, and Maida accidentally shoots him with his own gun. The sheriff knows about the gambler and clears her of the murder charge. After that, the woman returns the money to Steve and agrees to marry him.

== Cast ==
- Fannie Ward as Maida Carrington
- Jack Dean as Steve Boyce
- Charles West as Jack Morgan
- William Elmer as Halpin
- Gertrude Kellar as Helen
- Ronald Bradbury as Sheriff Barrett
- James Neill as Goodwin
