= For the Defense (1916 film) =

1916 film by Frank Reicher

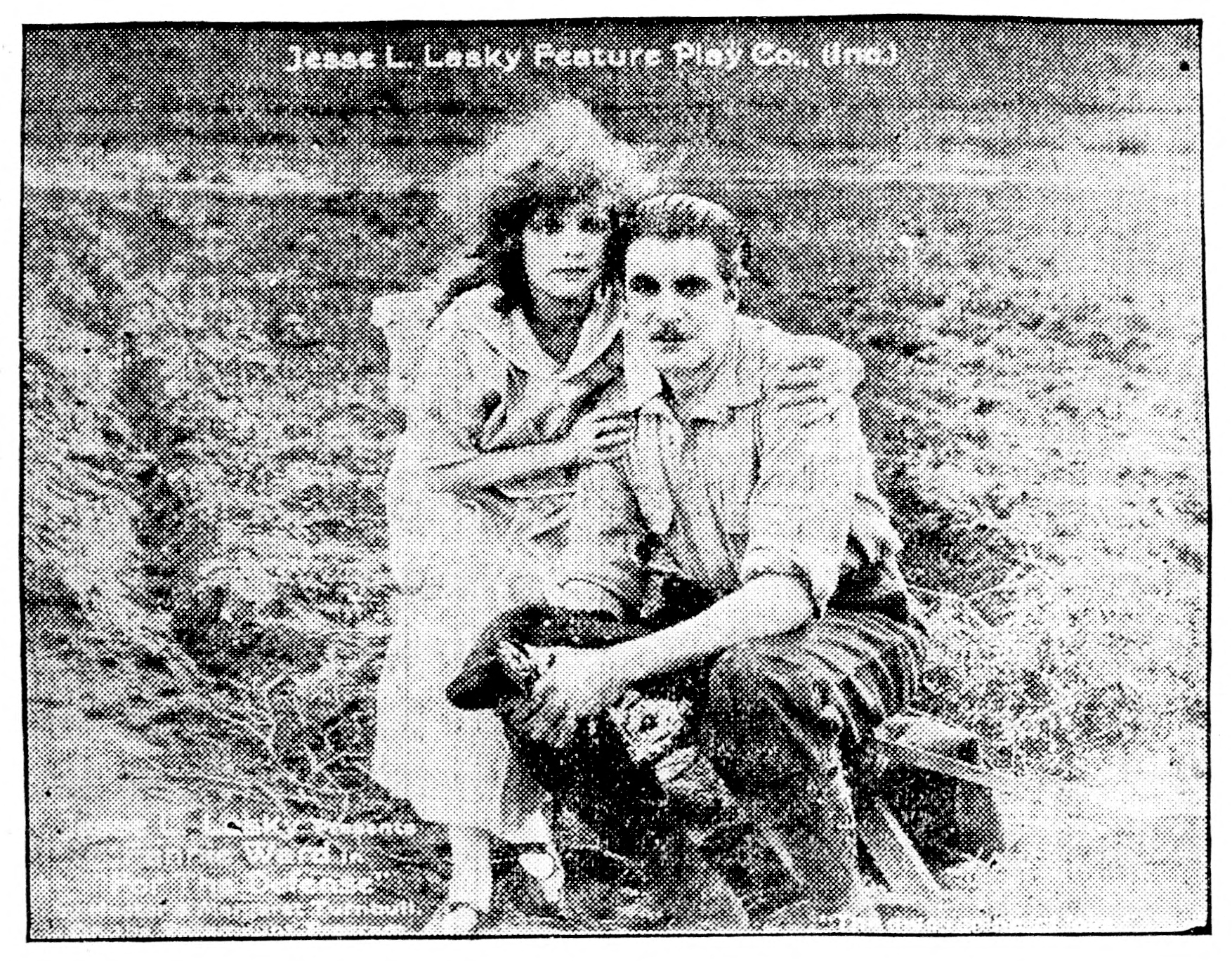
- Directed by: Frank Reicher
- Screenplay by: Hector Turnbull; Margaret Turnbull
- Produced by: Jesse L. Lasky
- Starring: Fannie Ward; Jack Dean; Paul Byron; Horace B. Carpenter; Camille Astor; James Neill
- Production company: Jesse L. Lasky Feature Play Company
- Distributed by: Paramount Pictures
- Release date: March 12, 1916
- Running time: 50 minutes
- Country: United States
- Languages: Silent; English intertitles

For the Defense is a surviving 1916 American silent drama film directed by Frank Reicher and written by Hector Turnbull and Margaret Turnbull. The film stars Fannie Ward, Jack Dean, Paul Byron, Horace B. Carpenter, Camille Astor and James Neill. The film was released on March 12, 1916, by Paramount Pictures.

== Plot ==
In New York, traveling from a French convent to one in Montreal, the novice Fidele Roget is captured by a slaver. Running away, the young woman witnesses a murder. He then meets Jim Webster who is about to commit suicide. She dissuades him and he decides to help her get to Canada. On the way, Jim is arrested for murder and tried. The man confides to Fidele that he was framed by his butler, who killed a man and then built the evidence to accuse him. Fidele realizes that it is the same crime he witnessed and decides to unmask the real murderer. Posing as a servant in Webster's house, she manages to trick the butler and make him confess. Jim is cleared and she gives up life in a convent to become his wife.

== Cast ==
- Fannie Ward as Fidele Roget
- Jack Dean as Jim Webster
- Paul Byron as Richard Madison
- Horace B. Carpenter as Henri
- Camille Astor as Ninette
- James Neill as Mr. Webster
- Gertrude Kellar as Mrs. Webster

== Preservation ==
- The film is preserved in the Library of Congress collection.
