= In Search of a Thrill =

1923 American silent drama film

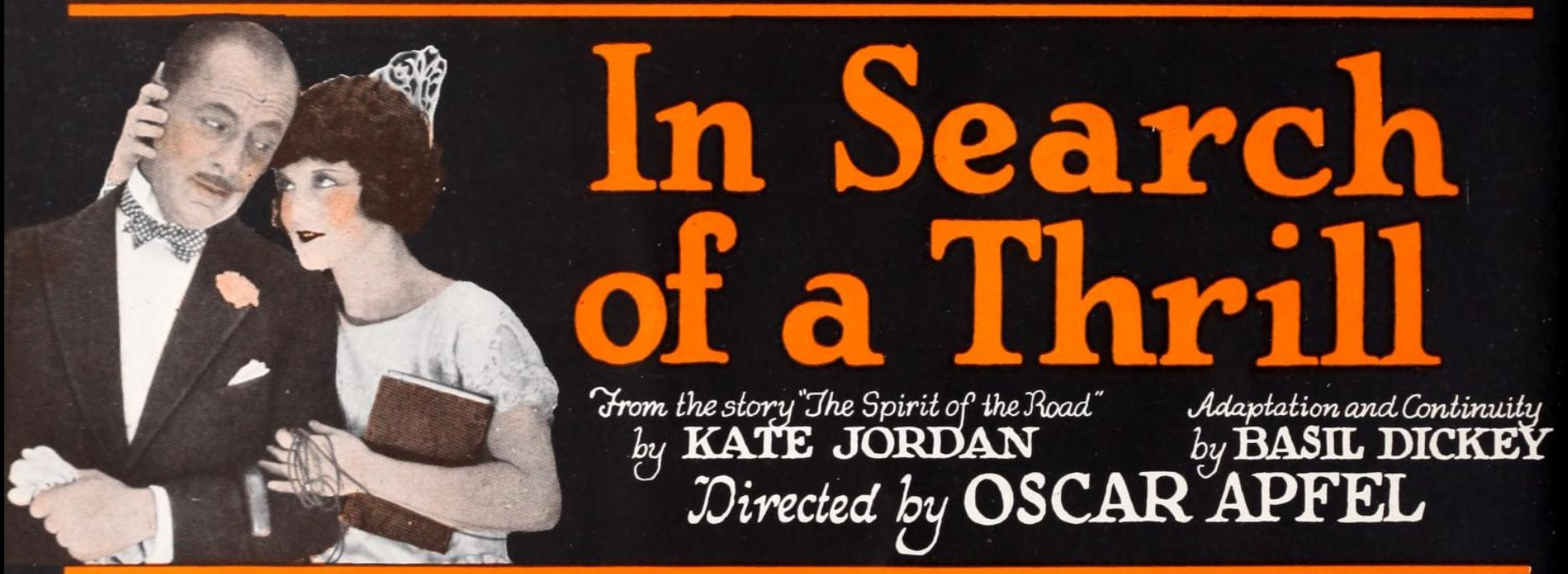
- Advertisement
- Directed by: Oscar Apfel
- Written by: Basil Dickey; Winifred Dunn; Kate Jordan
- Starring: Viola Dana; Warner Baxter; Mabel Van Buren
- Cinematography: John Arnold
- Production company: Metro Pictures
- Distributed by: Metro Pictures
- Release date: November 20, 1923 (U.S.)
- Running time: 55 minutes
- Country: United States
- Language: Silent (English intertitles)

In Search of a Thrill is a 1923 American silent drama film directed by Oscar Apfel and starring Viola Dana, Warner Baxter, and Mabel Van Buren.

== Cast ==
- Viola Dana as Ann Clemance
- Warner Baxter as Adrian Torrens
- Mabel Van Buren as Lila Lavender
- Templar Saxe as Sir George Dumphy
- Robert Schable as Tommy Perkins
- Walter Wills as René de Farge
- Rosemary Theby as Jeanne
- William Elmer as Percy (the valet)
- Leo White as Dance Professor

== Preservation ==
A complete print of In Search of a Thrill is held by Gosfilmofond in Moscow.

== Bibliography ==
- Munden, Kenneth White. The American Film Institute Catalog of Motion Pictures Produced in the United States, Part 1. University of California Press, 1997.
