= William Elmer =

American actor

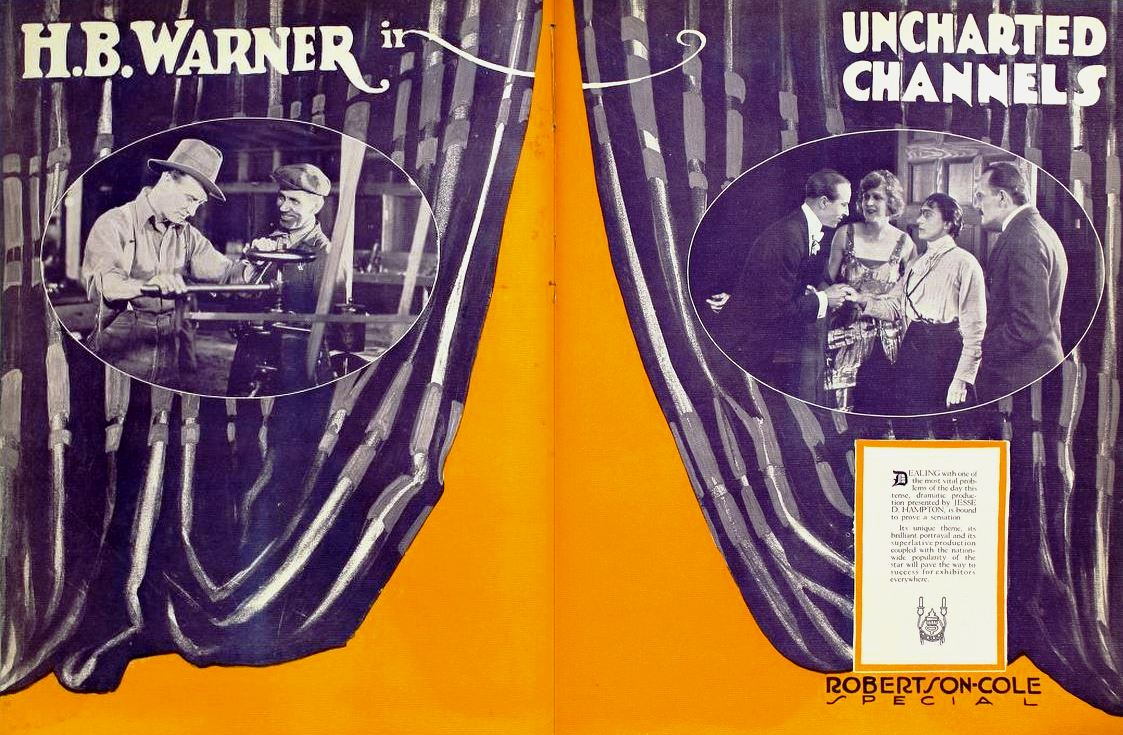
- Uncharted Channels (1920) is one of many features in which Elmer was cast.
- Born: April 25, 1869; Council Bluffs, Iowa, US
- Died: February 24, 1945 (aged 75); Hollywood, California, US
- Occupation: Actor
- Years active: 1913–1942

William Elmer (April 25, 1869 – February 24, 1945) was an American actor of the silent era. He appeared in more than 80 films between 1913 and 1942. He was born in Council Bluffs, Iowa and died in Hollywood, California. Elmer acted in stock theater in addition to his work in films.

== Selected filmography ==
- The Left-Handed Man (1913, Short) - Policeman
- The Squaw Man (1914) - Cash Hawkins
- The Master Mind (1914) - Creegan
- Brewster's Millions (1914) - 1st Prizefighter
- Shotgun Jones (1914, Short) - Hays
- The Master Mind (1914) - Creegan
- The Man on the Box (1914) - Troop Commander
- The Virginian (1914) - Trampas
- Ready Money (1914) - Jim Dolan
- Rose of the Rancho (1914) - Half Breed
- The Circus Man (1914) - Isaac Perry
- The Ghost Breaker (1914) - Robledo
- The Girl of the Golden West (1915) - Ashby
- A Gentleman of Leisure (1915) - Spike Mullins
- The Unafraid (1915, Short) - Jack McCarty
- The Captive (1915) - Turkish Officer
- The Arab (1915) - Meshur
- The Clue (1915) - Detective Williams
- Kindling (1915) - Rafferty
- The Fighting Hope (1915) - Detective Fletcher
- Carmen (1915) - Morales
- The Golden Chance (1915) - The Rent Collector
- The Ragamuffin (1916) - Kelly
- The Blacklist (1916) - King
- A Gutter Magdalene (1916) - Halpin
- The Selfish Woman (1916) - Jim
- The Honorable Friend (1916) - Murphy
- The Plow Girl (1916) - Kregler
- Joan the Woman (1916) - Guy Townes
- The Winning of Sally Temple (1917) - Tom Jellitt
- Castles for Two (1917) - Callahan
- The Prison Without Walls (1917) - Horse Gilligan
- The Girl at Home (1917) - Detective Hagen
- Freckles (1917) - Black Jack
- Her Strange Wedding (1917) - Peters
- The Countess Charming (1917) - Detective Boyle
- The Sunset Trail (1917) - Price Lovel
- His Mother's Boy (1917) - Banty Jones
- Wolves of the Rail (1918) - Pablo Trilles
- The Widow's Might (1918) - Minor Role
- The Things We Love (1918) - Kenwood's Agent
- The Family Skeleton (1918) - 'Spider' Doyle
- Playing the Game (1918) - Hodges
- The Bravest Way (1918)
- We Can't Have Everything (1918) - Props
- The Firefly of France (1918) - Aide to Von Blenheim
- A Burglar for a Night (1918) - William Neal
- Coals of Fire (1918) - Ben Roach
- He Comes Up Smiling (1918)
- The Way of a Man with a Maid (1918) - Bill
- The Dub (1919) - Burglar Bill
- Maggie Pepper (1919) - Dud Corey
- Alias Mike Moran (1919) - Tick Flynn
- Married in Haste (1919) - Chauffeur
- The Usurper (1919) - Bob Quentin
- Cheating Herself (1919) - Dugan
- Pinto (1920) - Lousy
- Leave It to Me (1920) - Red Kelly
- Forbidden Trails (1920) - Davis
- Uncharted Channels (1920) - Jim Baker
- Prairie Trails (1920) - Rod Blake
- The Road Demon (1921)
- The Big Town Round-Up (1921) - Jerry Casey
- Big Game (1921)
- The Foolish Age (1921) - Cauliflower Jim
- Two Kinds of Women (1922) - Poker Face
- Man with Two Mothers (1922) - Clancy
- Iron to Gold (1922) - Bat Piper
- The Bootlegger's Daughter (1922) - Ben Roach
- Pawned (1922) - Joe Burke
- In Search of a Thrill (1923) - Percy (the valet)
- The Whipping Boss (1924) - Spike
- The Night Hawk (1924)
- Battling Mason (1924) - (uncredited)
- Condemned (1929) - Pierre
- Cimarron (1931) - (uncredited)
- Les Misérables (1935) - Lawyer (uncredited)
- Kitty Foyle (1940) - Neway (uncredited)
- The Devil and Miss Jones (1941) - Attendant at Jim's Bath House (uncredited)
- Reap the Wild Wind (1942) - Juror (uncredited)
- The Magnificent Ambersons (1942) - Servant (uncredited)
