= Edwin Harley =

American actor (1849–?)

Edwin Harley (July 17, 1849, Philadelphia - October 29, 1933, Milwaukee) Born in Philadelphia, Harley was an actor in minstrel shows and later in silent films. He worked for the Reliance Majestic Company, Lasky Film Company, Albuquerque Film Company, Crown City Film Company, and Fine Arts Film Company.

== Filmography ==
- Treasure Island (1918)
- The Stain of Chuckawalla (Short)
- Susan Rocks the Boat (1916)
- Martha's Vindication (1916)
- Blackbirds (1915)
- The Wayward Son (1915 film)
- The Girl of the Golden West (1915)
- The Friends of the Sea (1915), short
- Jack Chanty (1915 film)
- The Law of Duty (1915), (Short)
- As in the Days of Old (1915), short
- The Fatal Hour (1915), short
- The Right to Live (1915), short
- A Night's Adventure (1915), short
- The Hoosier Schoolmaster (1914)
- A Father's Heart (1914), short
