= The Girl of the Golden West (1915 film) =

1915 film

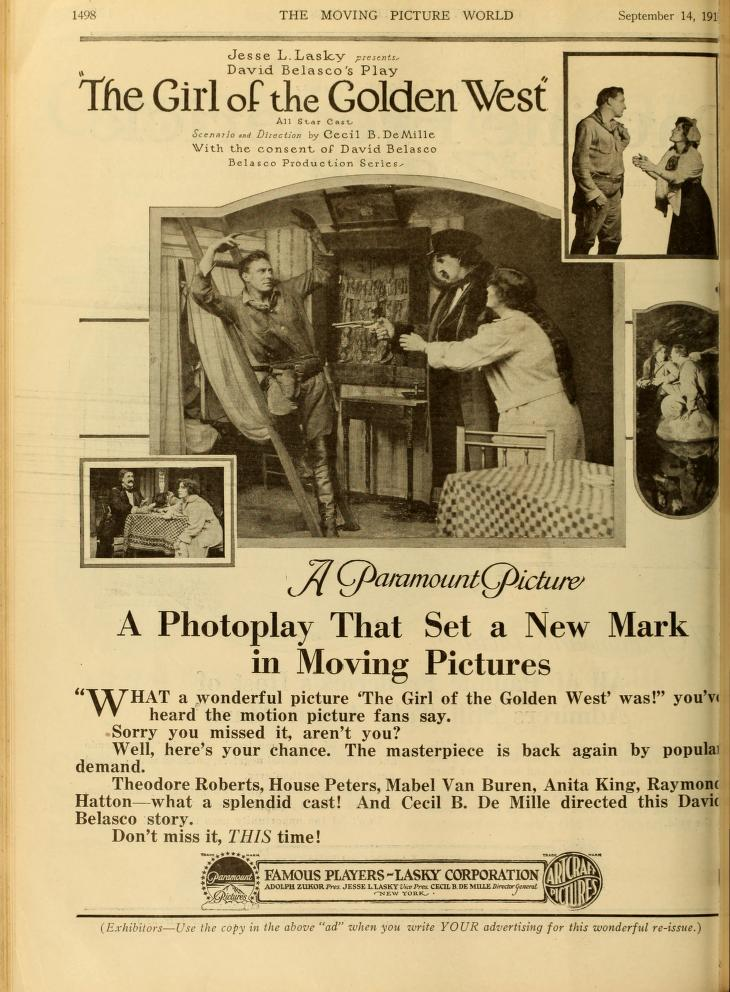
- Advertisement (1918)
- Directed by: Cecil B. DeMille
- Written by: Cecil B. DeMille
- Based on: The Girl of the Golden West; 1905 play by David Belasco
- Produced by: Cecil B. DeMille
- Starring: Mabel Van Buren
- Cinematography: Alvin Wyckoff
- Edited by: Cecil B. DeMille; W. Donn Hayes
- Distributed by: Paramount Pictures
- Release date: January 4, 1915
- Running time: 50 minutes
- Country: United States
- Languages: Silent; English intertitles

The Girl of the Golden West (1915) by Cecil B. DeMille

The Girl of the Golden West is a surviving 1915 American Western silent black-and-white film directed by Cecil B. DeMille. It was based on the 1905 play The Girl of the Golden West by David Belasco. Prints of the film survive in the Library of Congress film archive. It was the first of four film adaptations that have been made of the play.

== Plot ==
A hard-bitten saloon girl falls for a dashing outlaw, and tries to keep the local sheriff from catching him and sending him to prison.

== Cast ==
- Mabel Van Buren as The Girl
- Theodore Roberts as Jack Rance
- House Peters Sr. as Ramerrez
- Anita King as Wowkle
- Sydney Deane as Sidney Duck
- William Elmer as Ashby (credited as Billy Elmer)
- Jeanie MacPherson as Nina (credited as Jeane McPherson)
- Raymond Hatton as Castro
- Richard L'Estrange as Senor Slim (credited as Dick Le Strange)
- Tex Driscoll as Nick, The Bartender
- Artie Ortego as Antonio (credited as Arthur Ortego)
- John Ortego as Stagecoach Driver
- James Griswold as Guard
- Edwin Harley as Old Minstrel

== Preservation status ==
Prints survive at George Eastman Museum, the Library of Congress, Cineteca del Friuli (Gemona), Academy Film Archive (Beverly Hills).
