= Jack Chanty =

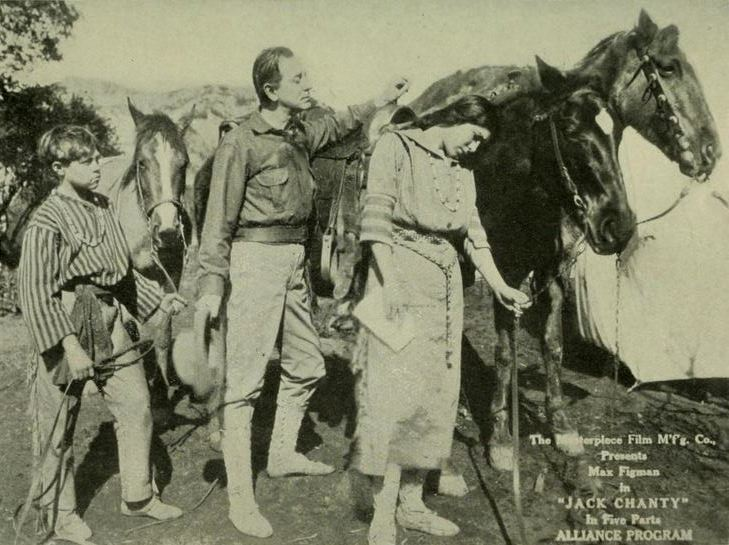
- l to r: Antrim Short, Max Figman, Lolita Figman
- Directed by: Max Figman
- Written by: Elliott J. Clawson; Hulbert Footner
- Produced by: Masterpiece Film Manufacturing Co.
- Starring: Max Figman; Lolita Robertson; Antrim Short
- Cinematography: George Rizard
- Distributed by: Alliance Films Corporation
- Release date: February 22, 1915
- Running time: 5 reels
- Country: United States
- Language: Silent (English titles)

Jack Chanty is a 1915 silent drama film directed by and starring Max Figman and co-starring his wife Lolita Robertson. It was written for the screen by Elliott J. Clawson, a writer later associated with MGM. The production was filmed in various parts of California.

== Cast ==
- Max Figman - Malcolm Piers, (Jack Chanty)
- Lolita Robertson - Mary Cranston
- Henry A. Livingston - John Garrod
- Edwin Harley - Sir Bryson Trangmar
- Antrim Short - Mary's Brother
- F. H. Garland - Ascota
- Ethel Davis - Luedd Trangmar

uncredited

- Al W. Filson
- Roy Stewart
- Normand McDonald
- Helen Marlborough
