= Fred Montague =

English actor

- Born: 1864; London, England
- Died: 3 July 1919 (aged 54–55); Los Angeles, California, USA
- Occupation: Actor
- Years active: 1912–1919

Fred Montague (1864 – 3 July 1919) was an English film actor of the silent era. He appeared in more than 50 films between 1912 and 1919. He was born in London and died in Los Angeles, California.

== Selected filmography ==
Year	Title	Role	Notes
1914	The Ghost Breaker	Gaspart, the ghost	
1914	The Man from Home	Earl of Hawcastle	
1914	What's His Name	Fairfax	
1914	The Call of the North	Jack Wilson	
1914	The Man on the Box	Col. Raleigh	
1914	The Master Mind	Henry Allen	
1914	The Squaw Man	Mr. Petrie	uncredited
1914	Cameo Kirby	Colonel Moreau	
1915	Graft		as Frederick Montague
1915	A Gentleman of Leisure	'Big Phil' Creedon	as Frederick Montague
1916	Barriers of Society	Silas Gorham	
1918	The Lure of the Circus	Howard Mason	
1918	Fast Company	Peter Van Huyler	
