= Neighbors' Wives =

1933 film

- Directed by: B. Reeves Eason
- Written by: Jack Natteford
- Produced by: Fanchon Royer
- Starring: Dorothy Mackaill; Tom Moore; Mary Kornman
- Cinematography: Ernest Miller
- Edited by: Jeanne Spencer
- Production company: Fanchon Royer Pictures
- Distributed by: Fanchon Royer Pictures
- Release date: September 20, 1933
- Running time: 61 minutes
- Country: United States
- Language: English

Neighbors' Wives is a 1933 American pre-Code drama film directed by B. Reeves Eason and starring Dorothy Mackaill, Tom Moore and Mary Kornman.

== Cast ==
- Dorothy Mackaill as Helen McGrath
- Tom Moore as John McGrath
- Mary Kornman as Mary McGrath
- Vivien Oakland as Ann Rainey
- Cyril Ring as Bill Cooper
- Emerson Treacy as Jeff Lee
- James Gordon as Judge Lee
- Mabel Van Buren as Mrs. Lee
- Paul Weigel as Otto

== Bibliography ==
- Dooley, Roger. From Scarface to Scarlett: American Films in the 1930s. Harcourt Brace Jovanovich, 1984.
