= Betty Lasky =

American film historian and author (1922–2017)

- Born: October 11, 1922; Los Angeles, California, U.S.
- Died: January 7, 2017 (aged 94); Los Angeles, California, U.S.
- Occupations: Author, film historian
- Father: Jesse L. Lasky
- Family: Jesse L. Lasky Jr. (brother)

Betty Lasky
- Writing career
- Genres: Movie industry, movie editor, film history, Hollywood history
- Notable work: RKO: The Biggest Little Major of Them All

Betty Lasky (October 11, 1922 – January 7, 2017) was an American film historian and author.

== Life ==
She was the daughter of pioneering producer Jesse L. Lasky, a key founder of Paramount Pictures and Bessie Mona Ginsberg Lasky, a painter known for her depictions of the California missions. Her late brother, Jesse L. Lasky, Jr., was the screenwriter of over 50 films, including a long partnership with the DeMilles. She grew up in and around Hollywood, piquing her interest in film history. Her writing career began as a screen story analyst for RKO Pictures, the Selznick Company and the Hamilburg Agency, as well as a position editing and writing for The Players Showcase Magazine.

In the 1970s, she worked with attorney Terrys T. Olender to preserve film artifacts saved by the City of Los Angeles in the Lincoln Heights Jail. As a result, she was asked by her former employer, RKO, to compile and publish a history of the film company (producer of Citizen Kane and King Kong). RKO: The Biggest Little Major of Them All was released in 1984 by Prentice-Hall. She also contributed the "Roots of Hollywood" chapter in Hollywood Archive: The Hidden History of Hollywood in the Golden Age (New York: Angel City Press and Universal Publishing, a division of Rizzoli) in 2000.

Miss Lasky died of pneumonia on the afternoon of January 7, 2017, at her home in Los Angeles, aged 94.

== Awards and honors ==
- 1984: Award of Excellence from Film Advisory Board for RKO: The Biggest Little Major of Them All.
- 1985-86: Honorary trustee of Hollywood Studio Museum and member of honorary committee for De Mille Dynasty Exhibition in Century City, CA.
- 1998-01: Historical Advisor "The Hollywood History Museum" Exhibits, Website, Newsletter and Advisor in Hollywood, CA.
- 2001-16: Member of the Board "George Westmore Research Library & Museum" Exhibits and Advisor in Burbank, CA.
