= Gertrude Kellar =

American actress

Gertrude Keller Bagley, also known as Gertrude Kellar, was an actress in the United States. She toured with the Burbank Theatre's Stock Company and James Neill's troupe, and appeared in silent films.

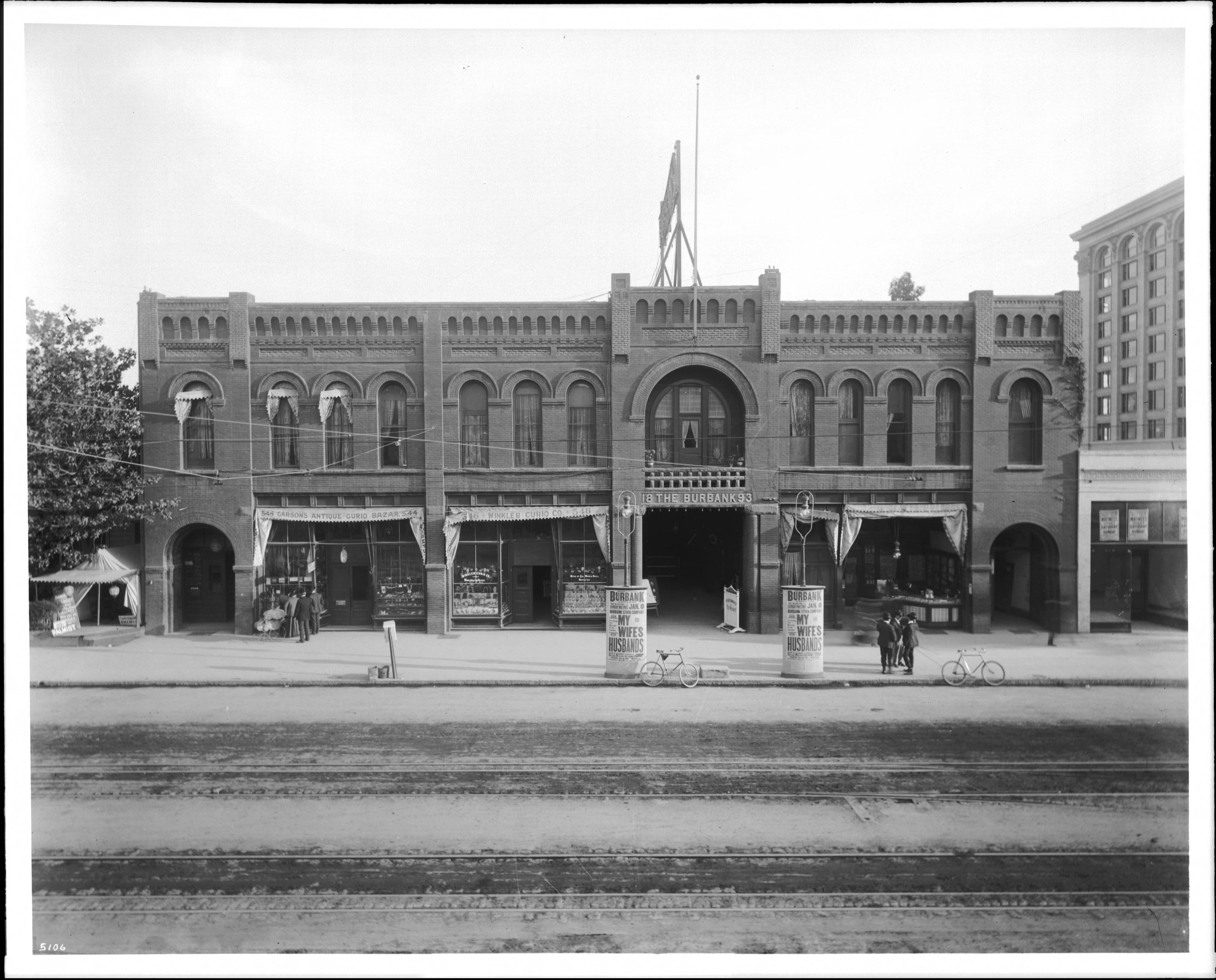
Burbank Theatre ca. 1903

In 1919 she "put on" the play Psychology of Dress for the Ebell Club at its Los Angeles Los Angeles Club luncheon. In 1923 she performed in a one-act play at the Wa Wa Club. In 1930 she performed a reading.

== Personal life ==
She lived at 2538 Seventh Avenue in Los Angeles. She married musician and lawyer Charles Leland Bagley (April 24, 1873 - 1965) in 1904.

A photograph of her and other cast members in the 1915 film A Gentleman of Leisure was published.

== Filmography ==
- A Gentleman of Leisure (1915)
- The Clue (1915) as Eve Bertram
- The Secret Orchard (1915) as Helen, Duchess of Cluny
- The Unafraid (1915) as Countess Novna
- A Gentleman of Leisure (1915) as Lady Julia Blunt (surviving film)
- Mr. Grex of Monte Carlo (1915) as Lady Wibourn (extant film)
- The Immigrant (1915) as Walton's housekeeper
- The Case of Becky (1915) as Miss Emerson, Dr. Emerson's sister, an extant film
- Young Romance (1915) as Mrs. Jenkins
- The Unafraid (1915) as Countess Novna
- A Gutter Magdalene (1916) as Helen
- For the Defense (1916 film) (1916) as Mrs. Webster
- Pudd'nhead Wilson (1916) as Mrs. Driscoll
