= Old Home Week (film) =

1925 film

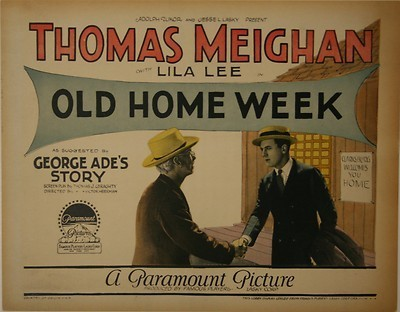
- Lobby card
- Directed by: Victor Heerman
- Screenplay by: George Ade; Thomas J. Geraghty
- Produced by: Jesse L. Lasky; Adolph Zukor
- Starring: Thomas Meighan; Lila Lee; Charles Dow Clark; Max Figman; Charles Sellon; Zelma Tiden; Sidney Paxton
- Cinematography: Alvin Wyckoff
- Production company: Famous Players–Lasky Corporation
- Distributed by: Paramount Pictures
- Release date: May 25, 1925
- Running time: 70 minutes
- Country: United States
- Language: Silent (English intertitles)

Old Home Week is a 1925 American silent comedy film directed by Victor Heerman and written by George Ade and Thomas J. Geraghty. The film stars Thomas Meighan, Lila Lee, Charles Dow Clark, Max Figman, Charles Sellon, Zelma Tiden, and Sidney Paxton. The film was released on May 25, 1925, by Paramount Pictures.

== Plot ==
As described in a film magazine review, Tom has been given a bad mark in his home town following a card game where a cheater placed some cards in his pocket. He opens a filling station in New York City. Business was poor, but the partner thought of having business cards printed that made it appear that they were partners in the "Amalgamated Oil Company." He returned to visit his home town to find the people buying stock in a promising oil well. Tom finds that the schemers are engaged in a hoax. When he goes to speak at the town's celebration, the people read his business card as saying he is interested in an oil company in New York, so they select him to be completely in charge of the new company. He finds that his mother has invested in the fraud. He decides to outwit the sharpers by placing a gusher of water at the well. As the schemers are about to leave with the $90,000 taken from the townspeople, they change their minds when they believe the oil well is really gushing oil. They buy back the well for $94,000, and Tom then reveals to them that they have become the butt of their own trickery. He is recognized as a hero and Ethel declares her love for him even though she previously had questioned his plans.

== Cast ==
- Thomas Meighan as Tom Clark
- Lila Lee as Ethel Harmon
- Charles Dow Clark as Marshall Coleman
- Max Figman as Townsend
- Charles Sellon as Uncle Henry
- Zelma Tiden as Mary Clark
- Sidney Paxton as Judge Harmon
- Joseph W. Smiley as Jim Ferguson
- Jack Terry as Frikkle
- Leslie Hunt as Otey Jinks
- Isabel West as Mrs. Clark
- Clayton Frye as Congressman Brady

== Preservation ==
With no prints of Old Home Week located on any film archives, it is a lost film.
