= Mabel Van Buren =

American stage and screen actress

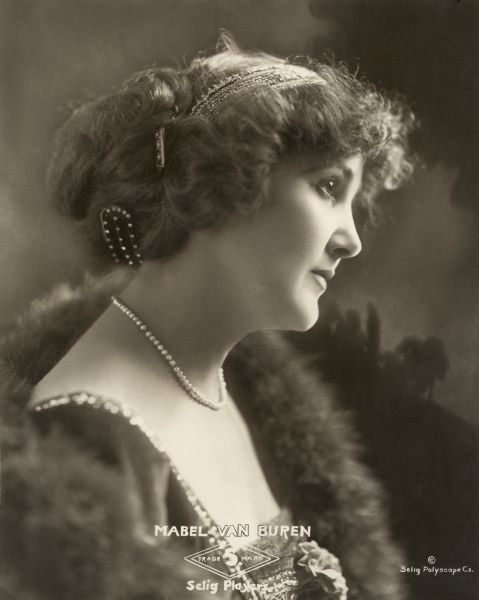
- Van Buren in 1913
- Born: Mabel Brown Southard; July 17, 1878; Chicago, Illinois, U.S.
- Died: November 4, 1947 (aged 69); Hollywood, California, U.S.
- Occupation: Actress
- Years active: 1909–1935
- Spouses: Ernest Joy (m. 1919; died 1924): James Gordon (died 1941)
- Children: 1

Mabel Van Buren (born Mabel Brown Southard; July 17, 1878 – November 4, 1947) was an American stage and screen actress.

== Biography ==
As a theatrical performer she played the leading lady in both The Virginian and The Squaw Man (1909). She was an actress for the Kinemacolor Company of America. Van Buren became prominent in motion pictures at the time of the development of feature-length movies in 1914. She starred in The Girl of the Golden West (1915) under the direction of Cecil B. Demille. It was Demille who brought Mabel west to Hollywood. Mabel was the first leading lady of the Famous Players–Lasky studio on Vine Street in Hollywood, California.

Her final role of note was in Neighbor's Wives (1933) in which she played Mrs. Lee. She continued acting in movies until the death of her husband, James Gordon in 1941. Other films in which she plays a prominent part are The Warrens of Virginia (1915), The Man From Home (1914), and Craig's Wife (1928).

Van Buren's residence was 4351 Kingswell Avenue, Los Angeles, California. She died after a brief illness on November 4, 1947, aged 69, in Los Angeles. Her daughter, Katherine Charlton, was also an actress, as was her daughter Kay Van Buren.

== Partial filmography ==
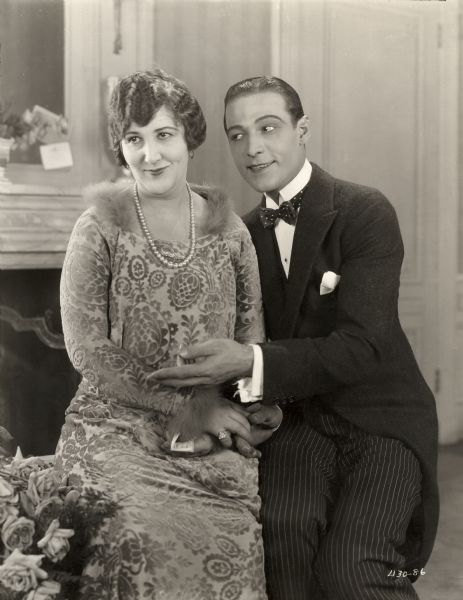
Film still of Mabel Van Buren with Rudolf Valentino in Beyond the Rocks (1922)

- The House with Closed Shutters (1910, Short) - On Porch / At Farewell
- Brewster's Millions (1914) - Mrs. Gray
- The Dishonored Medal (1914) - Anitra
- The Master Mind (1914) - Lucine, Three-Arm Fanny
- The Man on the Box (1914) - Kit Warburton
- The Man from Home (1914) - Ethel Granger Simpson
- The Circus Man (1914) - Mary Braddock
- The Ghost Breaker (1914) - Delores
- The Girl of the Golden West (1915) - The Girl
- The Warrens of Virginia (1915) - Mrs. Warren
- The Woman (1915) - Grace Robertson
- Should a Wife Forgive? (1915) - Mary Holmes
- The Sowers (1916) - Princess Tanya
- Ramona (1916) - Ramona (in the prologue)
- The House with the Golden Windows (1916) - Mrs. Peabody
- The Victoria Cross (1916) - Princess Adala
- Lost and Won (1917) - Minor Role
- Those Without Sin (1917) - Estelle Wallace
- A School for Husbands (1917) - Mrs. Airlie
- The Silent Partner (1917) - Edith Preston
- Unconquered (1917) - Mrs. Lenning
- The Jaguar's Claws (1917) - Marie
- The Squaw Man's Son (1917) - Lady Stuckley
- Hashimura Togo (1917) - Mrs. Reynolds
- The Countess Charming (1917) - Mrs. Vandergraft
- The Devil-Stone (1917) - Mrs. Rogers
- The Winding Trail (1918) - Lou
- Breakers Ahead (1918) - Aunt Agatha Pixley
- Riders of the Night (1918) - Sally's Aunt
- Hearts of Men (1919) - Tina Ferronni
- Young Mrs. Winthrop (1920) - Mrs. Dunbar
- The Sins of Rosanne (1920) - Mrs. Ozanne
- Conrad in Quest of His Youth (1920) - Nina
- The Four Horsemen of the Apocalypse (1921) - Elena
- A Wise Fool (1921) - Madame Langlois
- Moonlight and Honeysuckle (1921) - Mrs. Langley
- Miss Lulu Bett (1921) - Ina Deacon
- Beyond the Rocks (1922) - Jane McBride
- For the Defense (1922) - Cousin Selma
- The Woman Who Walked Alone (1922) - Hannah Schriemann
- While Satan Sleeps (1922) - Sunflower Sadie
- Manslaughter (1922) - Prisoner
- Youth to Youth (1922) - Mrs. Brookins
- Pawned (1922) - Mrs. Veniza
- Fighting Blood (1923) - Mrs. Wilcox - Judy's Mother
- Wandering Daughters (1923) - Annie Bowden
- The Light That Failed (1923) - Madame Binat
- Lights Out (1923) - Mrs. Gallant
- In Search of a Thrill (1923) - Lila Lavender
- The Dawn of a Tomorrow (1924) - Bet
- The Top of the World (1925) - Mary Ann
- Smooth as Satin (1925) - Mrs. Munson
- His Secretary (1925) - Mrs. Sloden
- The King of Kings (1927) - (uncredited)
- The Meddlin' Stranger (1927) - Mrs. Crawford
- Craig's Wife (1928) - Mrs. Frazer
- The Flyin' Buckaroo (1928) - Mrs. Brown
- His First Command (1929) - Mrs. Sargent
- Neighbors' Wives (1933) - Mrs. Lee
- Mississippi (1935) - Party Guest (uncredited) (final film role)
