= The Man on the Box =

1914 film

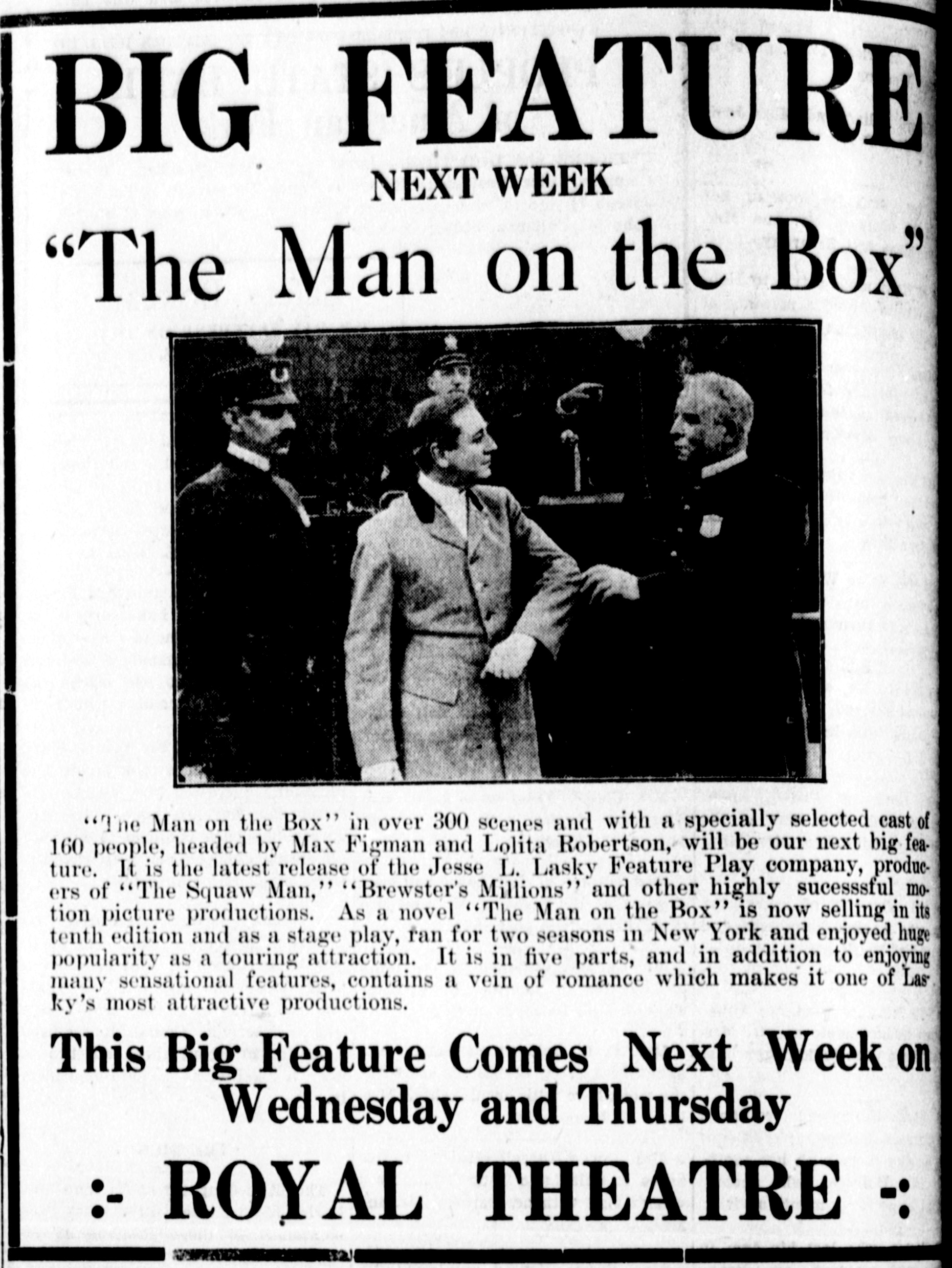
- Newspaper advertisement.
- Directed by: Oscar Apfel; Cecil B. DeMille (uncredited)
- Based on: The Man on the Box by Harold MacGrath
- Starring: Horace B. Carpenter
- Release date: July 13, 1914
- Country: United States
- Language: Silent with English intertitles

The Man on the Box is a 1914 American silent comedy-drama film directed by Oscar Apfel and co-directed by Cecil B. DeMille. It was based on the 1904 novel of the same name by Harold MacGrath and stars Horace B. Carpenter.

Max Figman had starred in the Broadway version in 1907 and reprises his role here in this film. A surviving film at the Library of Congress and the Wisconsin Center for Film and Theater Research (Madison).

== Cast ==
- Horace B. Carpenter as Russian ambassador
- Jane Darwell as Mrs. Chadwick
- William Elmer as Troop commander
- Max Figman as Lt. Bob Warburton
- Harry Fisher as Chales Henderson
- Betty Johnson as Nancy Warburton (as Betty Jonson)
- Jack W. Johnston as Count Karloff (as J.W. Johnston)
- C. F. Le None as Scout
- Fred Montague as Col. Raleigh
- James Neill as Col. Annesley
- Lolita Robertson as Betty Annesley
- Mabel Van Buren as Kit Warburton
