= The Blacklist (film) =

1916 film by William C. deMille

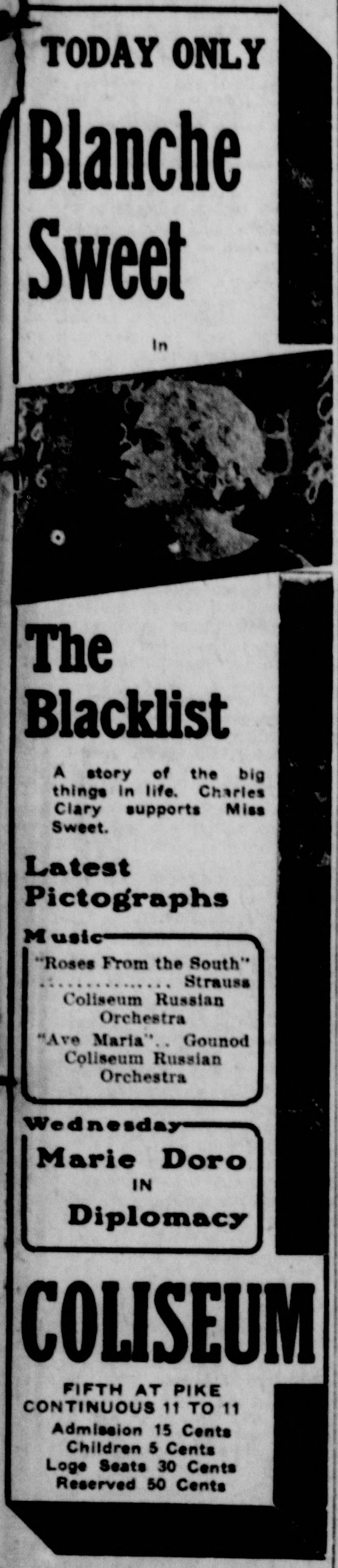
- Newspaper advertisement
- Directed by: William C. deMille
- Screenplay by: Marion Fairfax; William C. deMille
- Produced by: Jesse L. Lasky
- Starring: Blanche Sweet; Charles Clary; Ernest Joy; William Elmer; Horace B. Carpenter; Lucien Littlefield
- Cinematography: Charles Rosher
- Production company: Jesse L. Lasky Feature Play Company
- Distributed by: Paramount Pictures
- Release date: February 20, 1916
- Running time: 50 minutes
- Country: United States
- Language: Silent (English intertitles)

The Blacklist is a 1916 American silent drama film directed by William C. deMille and written by Marion Fairfax and William C. deMille. The film stars Blanche Sweet, Charles Clary, Ernest Joy, William Elmer, Horace B. Carpenter, and Lucien Littlefield. The film was released on February 20, 1916, by Paramount Pictures.

== Plot ==
Colorado miners strike, this forces, Warren Harcourt, the coal company manager to come to the scene. This causes a chain of events that will change the current status quo.

== Cast ==
- Blanche Sweet as Vera Maroff
- Charles Clary as Warren Harcourt
- Ernest Joy as Mark Norton
- William Elmer as King
- Horace B. Carpenter as Sergius Maroff
- Lucien Littlefield as Frederick Holtz
- Jane Wolfe as Mary

== See also ==
- Colorado Coalfield War
