= The Unafraid =

1915 film

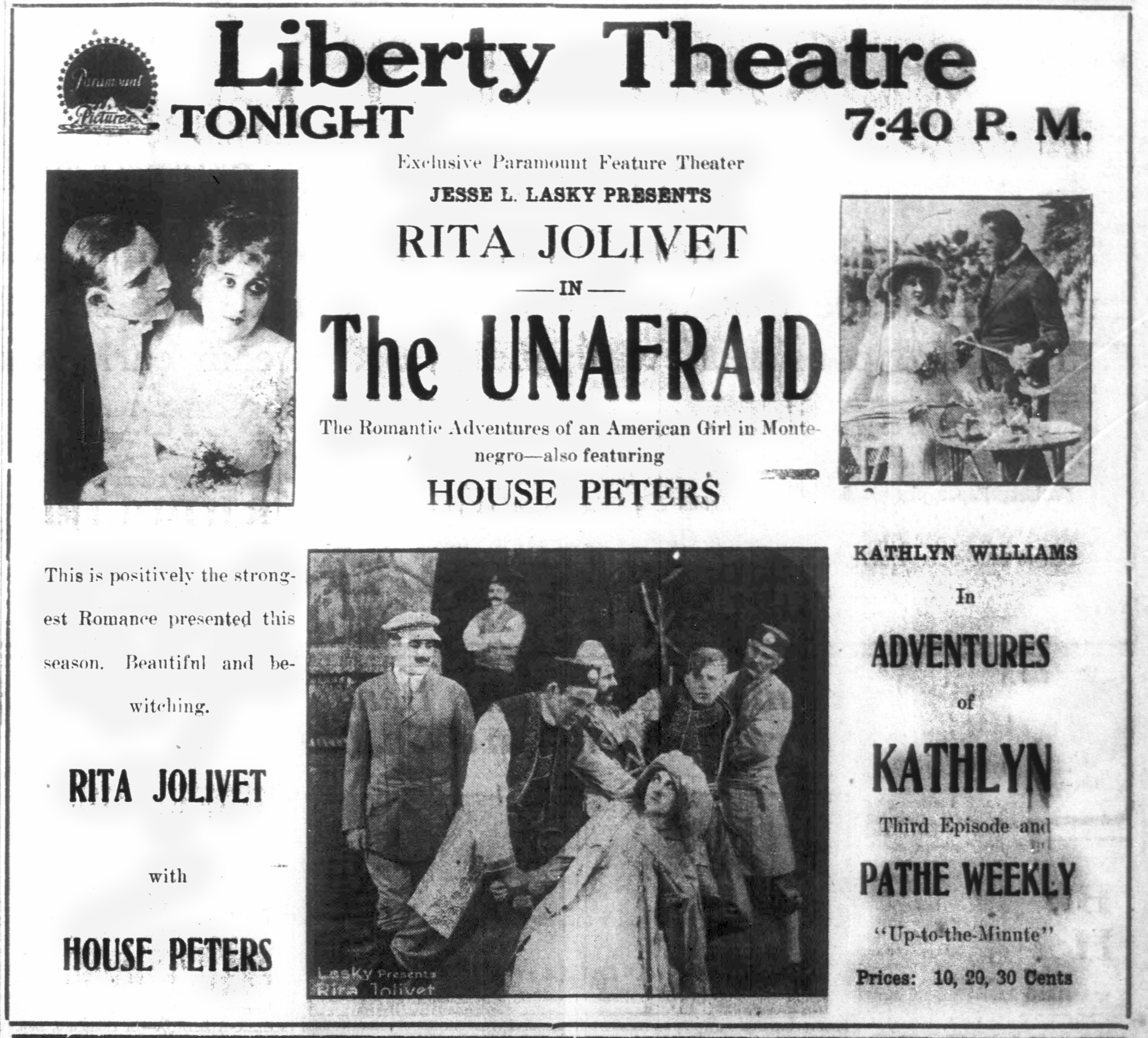
- Newspaper advertisement.
- Directed by: Cecil B. DeMille
- Written by: Cecil B. DeMille; Eleanor M. Ingram
- Produced by: Cecil B. DeMille
- Starring: House Peters and Rita Jolivet
- Cinematography: Alvin Wyckoff
- Edited by: Cecil B. DeMille
- Release date: April 1, 1915
- Running time: 40 minutes
- Country: United States
- Language: Silent (English intertitles)

The Unafraid is a 1915 American silent drama film directed by Cecil B. DeMille. Rita Jolivet completed this film just before boarding the Lusitania on its final voyage. The film survives and is preserved in the film archive at the George Eastman Museum.

It was based on a novel by Eleanor M. Ingram.

== Cast ==
- Rita Jolivet as Delight Warren
- House Peters as Stefan Balsic
- Page Peters as Michael Balsic
- William Elmer as Jack McCarty
- Lawrence Peyton as Danilo Lesendra
- Theodore Roberts as Dual Empire Secret Agent
- Al Ernest Garcia as Joseph
- Marjorie Daw as Irenya
- Raymond Hatton as Russian Valet
- Gertrude Kellar as Countess Novna
