= Jesse L. Lasky =

American film producer (1880–1958)

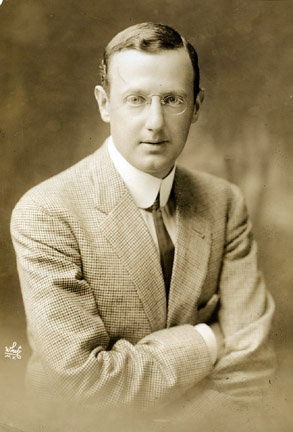
- Lasky in 1915
- Born: Jesse Louis Lasky; September 13, 1880; San Francisco, California, U.S.
- Died: January 13, 1958 (aged 77); Beverly Hills, California, U.S.
- Resting place: Hollywood Forever Cemetery
- Occupation: Film producer
- Spouse: Bessie Mona Ginsberg
- Children: 3, including Jesse Jr. and Betty
- Relatives: Samuel Goldwyn (former brother-in-law), Mervyn LeRoy (cousin)

Signature
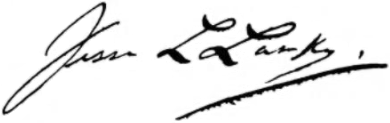

Jesse Louis Lasky (September 13, 1880 – January 13, 1958) was an American pioneer motion picture producer who was a key founder of what was to become Paramount Pictures, and father of screenwriter Jesse L. Lasky Jr.

== Early life ==
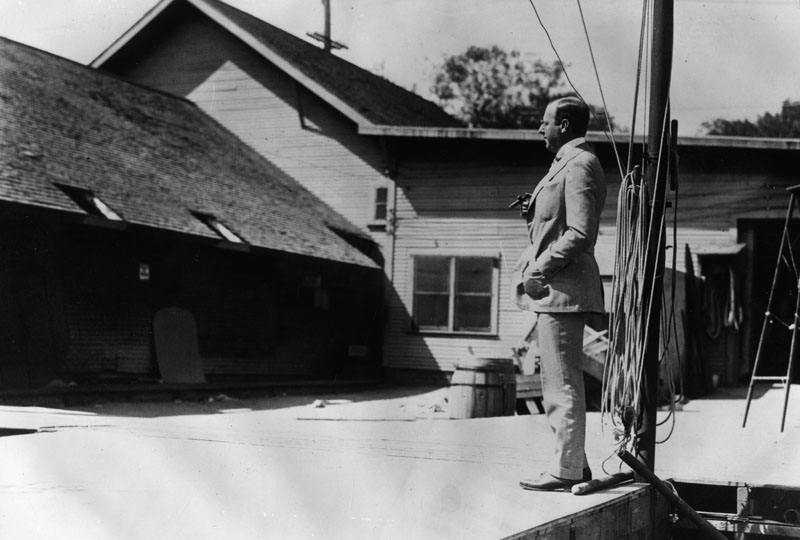
Lasky standing outside "The Old Barn", where he and Cecil B. DeMille started a picture studio in 1913.

Born in to a Jewish family in San Francisco, California, Lasky worked at a variety of jobs but began his entertainment career as a vaudeville performer, playing the cornet in a duo act with his sister Blanche.

== Career ==
Lasky was a newspaper reporter, an Alaskan gold prospector, later, a vaudeville promoter.

In 1911, Lasky was the producer of two Broadway musicals: Hello, Paris and A La Broadway. Beatrice deMille was also producing plays on Broadway and she introduced him to her son Cecil B. DeMille.

=== Jesse L. Lasky Feature Play Company ===
In 1913 Lasky and his sister Blanche's husband, Samuel Goldfish (before changing his name to Samuel Goldwyn), teamed with DeMille and Oscar Apfel to form the Jesse L. Lasky Feature Play Company, with Lasky as president. On December 22, 1913, with limited funds, Lasky, DeMille and Goldfish (Goldwyn) leased a barn from Jacob Stern and subleased Burns and Revier Studio and Laboratory from Louis Loss Burns and Harry Revier (all on land owned by Jacob Stern), on the east side of the 1600 block of Vine Street just south of Hollywood and Vine, within the City of Los Angeles where they made Hollywood's first feature film, DeMille's The Squaw Man, which became a big success. Known today as the Lasky-DeMille Barn, it is home to the Hollywood Heritage Museum.

Other films produced by the studio include the original version of Brewster's Millions, The Call of the North, Cameo Kirby, The Circus Man, The Ghost Breaker, The Making of Bobby Burnit, The Man from Home, The Man on the Box, The Master Mind, The Only Son, The Virginian (all 1914), The Cheat, Carmen, Kindling (all 1915), The Blacklist (1916) and The Bottle Imp (1917).

=== Famous Players–Lasky ===
In 1916, Lasky's company merged with Adolph Zukor's rival company Famous Players Film Company to create Famous Players–Lasky Corporation, with Zukor as president and Lasky as vice-president in charge of production. In 1920, Famous Players–Lasky built a large studio facility in Astoria, New York, now known as the Kaufman Astoria Studios.

Films produced by Lasky include What Every Woman Knows (1921), The Covered Wagon (1923), A Kiss for Cinderella (1925), Beau Geste (1926) and Wings (1927).

In September 1927, Famous Players–Lasky was reorganized under the name Paramount Famous Lasky Corporation, later becoming the Paramount Pictures Corporation.

In 1927, Lasky was one of the 36 people who founded the Academy of Motion Picture Arts and Sciences. His Wings was the first film to win the Academy Award for Best Picture.

Financial problems arose within the industry as a result of the Great Depression and Lasky resigned in 1932 after personally losing $12 million. Famous Players–Lasky went into receivership in 1933 and was folded into Paramount.

=== Other producing roles ===
He became an independent film producer and in 1935 formed a partnership with Mary Pickford to produce films but within a few years she dissolved their business relationship. He went on to produce a radio talent show.

Lasky then found work as an associate producer at RKO Pictures before becoming a producer at Warner Bros. until 1945 when he formed his own production company. At Warners he produced Sergeant York (1941), The Adventures of Mark Twain (1944) and Rhapsody in Blue (1945). His last film was The Great Caruso (1951). He became in debt to the Bureau of Internal Revenue and was preparing another production with Paramount, The Brass Band, to help pay off the debt but died before production started.

== Personal life and death ==
Jesse L. Lasky died from a heart attack in Beverly Hills at the age of 77. He is interred in Hollywood Forever Cemetery, adjacent to Paramount Studios, in Hollywood.

He and his wife Bessie had three children: Jesse L. Jr., Betty, and Billy.

In 1957, he published his autobiography, I Blow My Own Horn.

== Legacy ==
For his contribution to the motion picture industry, Lasky has a star on the Hollywood Walk of Fame at 6433 Hollywood Boulevard. Lasky Drive in Beverly Hills was named in his honor.
