= The Selfish Woman =

1916 film by E. Mason Hopper

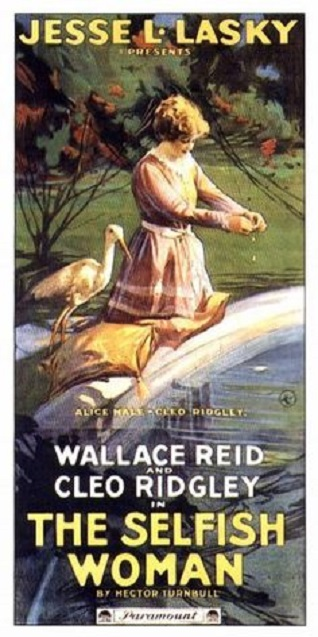
- Film poster
- Directed by: E. Mason Hopper
- Screenplay by: Hector Turnbull; Margaret Turnbull
- Produced by: Jesse L. Lasky
- Starring: Wallace Reid; Cleo Ridgely; Edythe Chapman; Charles Arling; Joe King; Jane Wolfe
- Cinematography: Percy Hilburn (French)
- Production company: Jesse L. Lasky Feature Play Company
- Distributed by: Paramount Pictures
- Release date: July 9, 1916
- Running time: 50 minutes
- Country: United States
- Language: English

The Selfish Woman is a lost 1916 American drama silent film directed by E. Mason Hopper and written by Hector Turnbull and Margaret Turnbull. The film stars Wallace Reid, Cleo Ridgely, Edythe Chapman, Charles Arling, Joe King and Jane Wolfe. The film was released on July 9, 1916, by Paramount Pictures.

== Cast ==
- Wallace Reid as Tom Morley
- Cleo Ridgely as Alice Hale Morley
- Edythe Chapman as Mrs. Hale
- Charles Arling as Thomas Morley Sr
- Joe King as Donald McKenzie
- Jane Wolfe as Indian Servant
- William Elmer as Jim
- Horace B. Carpenter as Mike
- Bob Fleming as Foreman
- Milton Brown as Sheriff
