= The Sleepwalker (1922 film) =

1922 film by Edward LeSaint

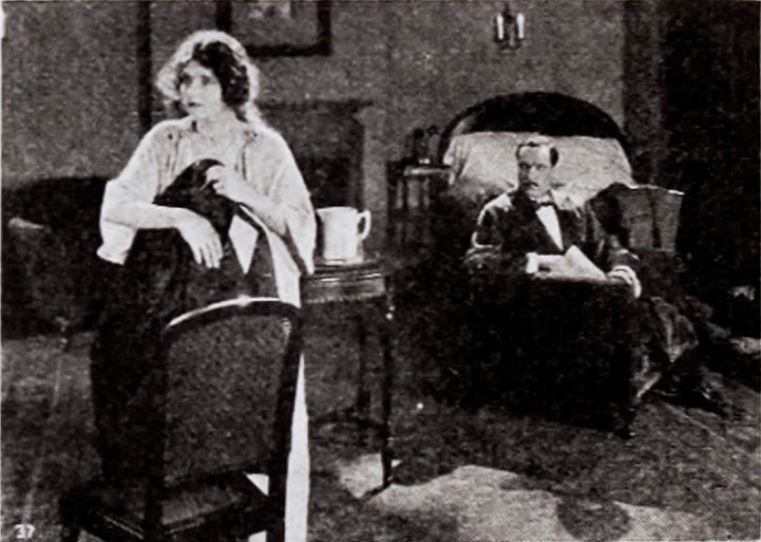
- Still with Constance Binney and Bertram Grassby
- Directed by: Edward LeSaint
- Screenplay by: Wells Hastings
- Story by: Aubrey Stauffer
- Starring: Constance Binney; Jack Mulhall; Edythe Chapman; Florence Roberts; Bertram Grassby; Cleo Ridgely; Winifred Edwards
- Cinematography: H. Kinley Martin
- Production company: Realart Pictures Corporation
- Distributed by: Paramount Pictures
- Release date: April 9, 1922
- Running time: 50 minutes
- Country: United States
- Language: Silent (English intertitles)

The Sleepwalker is a lost 1922 American drama silent film directed by Edward LeSaint and written by Wells Hastings and Aubrey Stauffer. Starring Constance Binney, Jack Mulhall, Edythe Chapman, Florence Roberts, Bertram Grassby, Cleo Ridgely and Winifred Edwards, it was released on April 9, 1922, by Paramount Pictures.

== Plot ==
As described in a film magazine, Doris Dumond leaves the convent and joins her mother Mrs. Fabian Dumond, who is being harassed by the villainous debt collector Ambrose Hammond, at a fashionable hotel. A young millionaire, Phillip Carruthers, who loves her and whom she loves is also present. When Doris learns of her mother's difficulty she is moved by her subconscious mind to walk into the villain's room in her sleep. She awakens in Ambrose's hotel room, and discovery follows. Towards the next morning, Doris again walks in her sleep and, from a lofty window ledge, she rescues Mary, the young daughter of another guest who had seen Doris go into Ambrose's room and sought to disgrace her. In the end, all prior difficulties are disposed of.

== Cast ==
- Constance Binney as Doris Dumond
- Jack Mulhall as Phillip Carruthers
- Edythe Chapman as Sister Ursula
- Florence Roberts as Mrs. Fabian Dumond
- Bertram Grassby as Ambrose Hammond
- Cleo Ridgely as Mrs. Langley
- Winifred Edwards as Mary Langley
