= Public Opinion (1916 film) =

1916 film by Frank Reicher

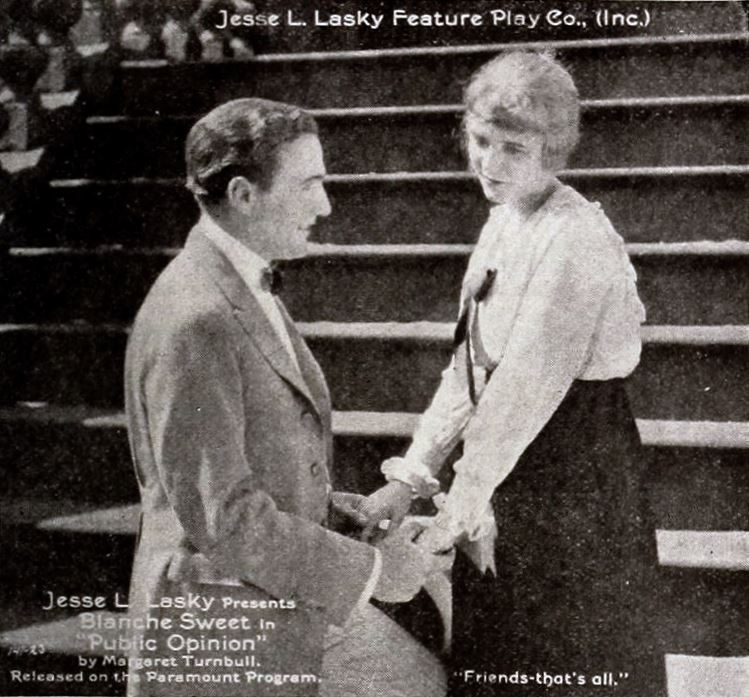
- Still with caption, "Friends - that's all."
- Directed by: Frank Reicher; Roscoe Smith (Assistant Director)
- Written by: Margaret Turnbull (original story & scenario)
- Produced by: Jesse Lasky
- Starring: Blanche Sweet
- Cinematography: Dent Gilbert
- Distributed by: Paramount Pictures
- Release date: August 20, 1916
- Running time: 50 minutes; 5 reels
- Country: United States
- Language: Silent (English intertitles)

Public Opinion is a surviving 1916 American silent drama film produced by Jesse Lasky and distributed by Paramount Pictures. It was directed by Frank Reicher and stars Blanche Sweet. Margaret Turnbull provided the original screen story and scenario. Public Opinion is one of very few of Blanche Sweet's Paramount Pictures films still in existence. It is preserved by the Library of Congress.

== Cast ==
- Blanche Sweet as Hazel Gray
- Earle Foxe as Dr. Henry Morgan
- Edythe Chapman as Mrs. Carson Morgan
- Tom Forman as Phillip Carson
- Elliott Dexter as Gordon Graham
- Raymond Hatton as Smith
- R. Henry Grey (credited as Robert Henry Gray)
