= The Victoria Cross (film) =

1916 film by Edward LeSaint

- Directed by: Edward LeSaint
- Screenplay by: Paul M. Potter; Margaret Turnbull
- Produced by: Jesse L. Lasky
- Starring: Lou Tellegen; Cleo Ridgely; Sessue Hayakawa; Ernest Joy; Mabel Van Buren; Frank Lanning
- Cinematography: Harold Rosson
- Production company: Jesse L. Lasky Feature Play Company
- Distributed by: Paramount Pictures
- Release date: December 14, 1916
- Running time: 50 minutes
- Country: United States
- Language: Silent (English intertitles)

The Victoria Cross is a surviving 1916 American silent drama film directed by Edward LeSaint and written by Paul M. Potter and Margaret Turnbull. The film stars Lou Tellegen, Cleo Ridgely, Sessue Hayakawa, Ernest Joy, Mabel Van Buren and Frank Lanning. The film was released on December 14, 1916, by Paramount Pictures.

== Cast ==
- Lou Tellegen as Major Ralph Seton
- Cleo Ridgely as Joan Strathallen
- Sessue Hayakawa as Azimoolah
- Ernest Joy as Sir Allen Strathallen
- Mabel Van Buren as Princess Adala
- Frank Lanning as Cassim
- Harold Skinner as Seereek

== Preservation status ==
A print is preserved in the Library of Congress collection Packard Campus for Audio-Visual Conservation.
