= The Unknown (1915 drama film) =

1915 film

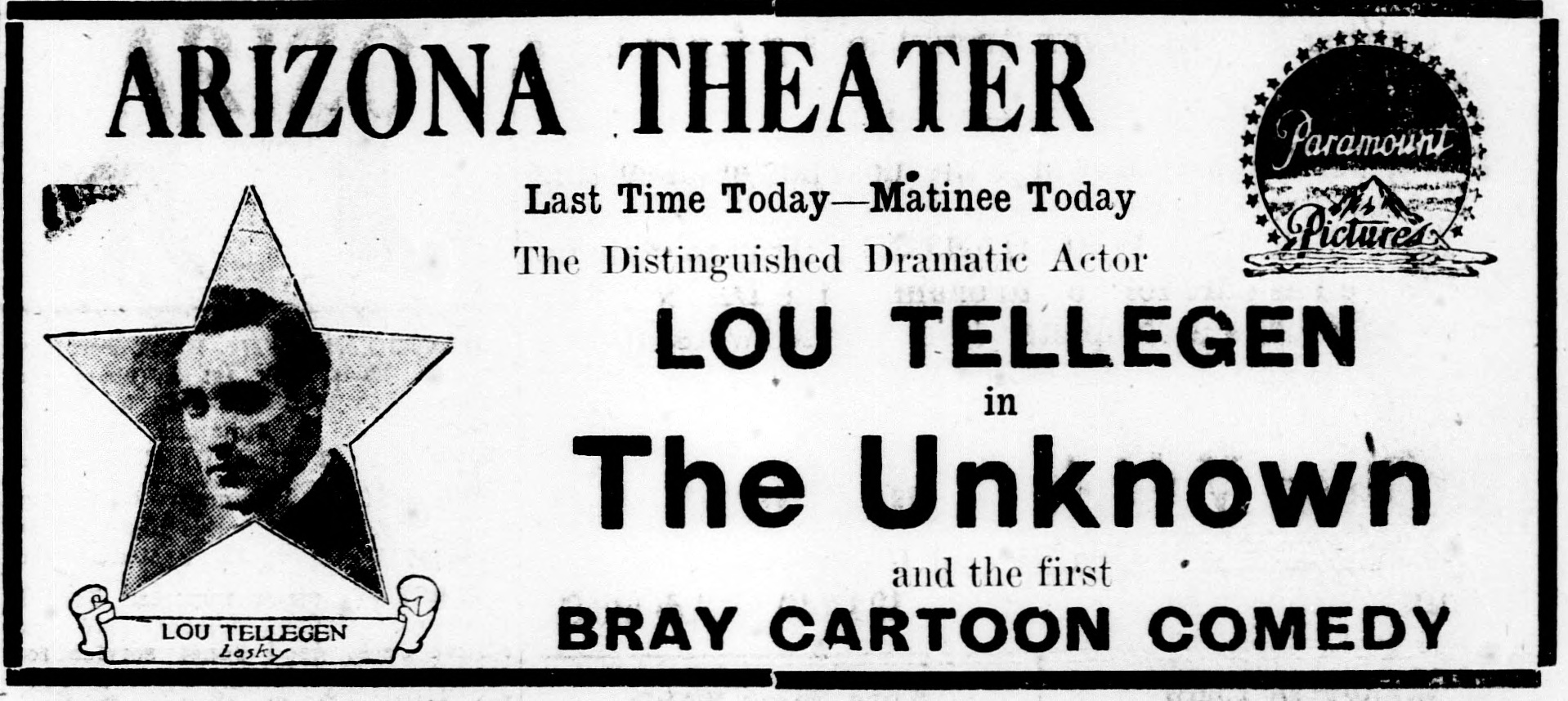
- Newspaper advertisement
- Directed by: George Melford
- Written by: Margaret Turnbull (scenario); Ida Alexa Ross Wylie
- Based on: The Red Mirage; 1913 novel by Ida Alexa Ross Wylie
- Produced by: Jesse L. Lasky
- Starring: Lou Tellegen; Theodore Roberts; Dorothy Davenport
- Production company: Jesse Lasky Feature Play Company
- Distributed by: Paramount Pictures
- Release date: December 9, 1915
- Running time: 5 reels (50 minutes)
- Country: United States
- Language: Silent (English intertitles)

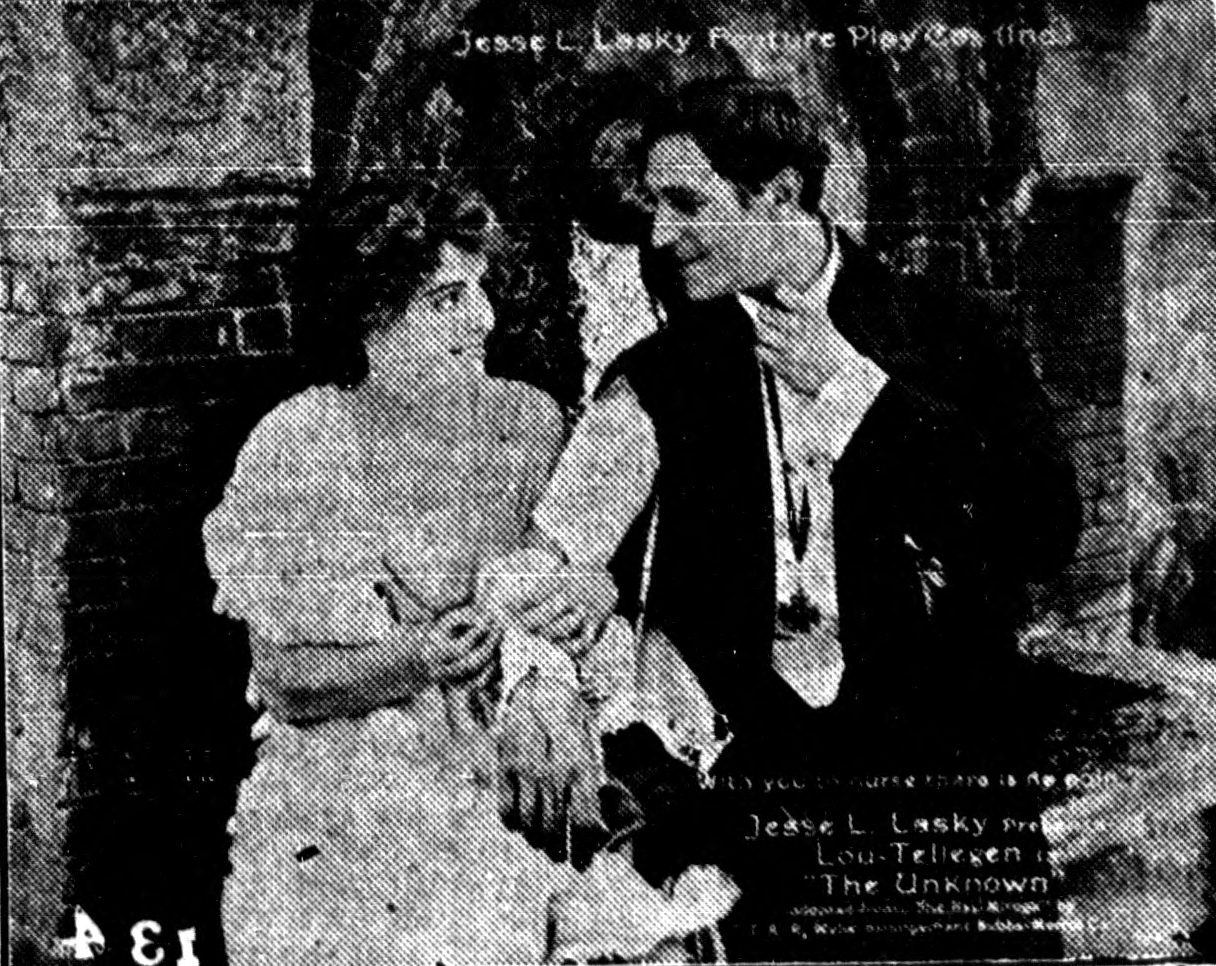
Scene from the film

The Unknown is a 1915 American silent drama film produced by Jesse L. Lasky and distributed by Paramount Pictures. Directed by George Melford, it stars Lou Tellegen, Theodore Roberts, and Dorothy Davenport.

== Cast ==
- Lou Tellegen as Richard Farquhar
- Theodore Roberts as Captain Destinn
- Dorothy Davenport as Nancy Preston
- Hal Clements as Captain Arnaud
- Tom Forman as First Private
- Raymond Hatton as Second Private
- Horace B. Carpenter as Hotel Proprietor
- George Gebhardt
- Lucien Littlefield

== Preservation status ==
A print of this film is preserved in the Library of Congress.
