= The Love Mask =

1916 film by Frank Reicher

- Directed by: Frank Reicher
- Screenplay by: Cecil B. DeMille; Jeanie MacPherson
- Produced by: Jesse L. Lasky
- Starring: Cleo Ridgely; Wallace Reid
- Cinematography: Walter Stradling
- Production company: Jesse L. Lasky Feature Play Company
- Distributed by: Paramount Pictures
- Release date: April 13, 1916
- Running time: 50 minutes
- Country: United States
- Language: English

The Love Mask is a 1916 American drama silent film directed by Frank Reicher and written by Cecil B. DeMille and Jeanie MacPherson. The film stars Cleo Ridgely, Wallace Reid, Earle Foxe, Bob Fleming, Dorothy Abril and Lucien Littlefield. The film was released on April 13, 1916, by Paramount Pictures.

Location shooting for the film was done in the Mojave Desert.

== Plot ==
As described in a film magazine, Kate Kenner has her claim to a gold mine jumped and both the sheriff and a bandit try to help her. Inspired by the bandit, Kate masquerades as a bandit herself to reclaim her mine. She finds herself unfit for the work and is arrested. To make matter worse, Kate is mistaken for a famous bandit known as "Silver Spurs." While Kate is being tried for her banditry, the real Silver Spurs launches a heist.

== Cast ==
- Cleo Ridgely as Kate Kenner
- Wallace Reid as Dan Derring
- Earle Foxe as Silver Spurs
- Bob Fleming as Jim
- Dorothy Abril as Estrella
- Raymond Hatton as The Mexican
- Lucien Littlefield

== Preservation ==
With no prints of The Love Mask located in any film archives, it is considered a lost film. In October 2019, the film was cited by the National Film Preservation Board on their Lost U.S. Silent Feature Films list.
