= The Puppet Crown =

1915 film by George Melford

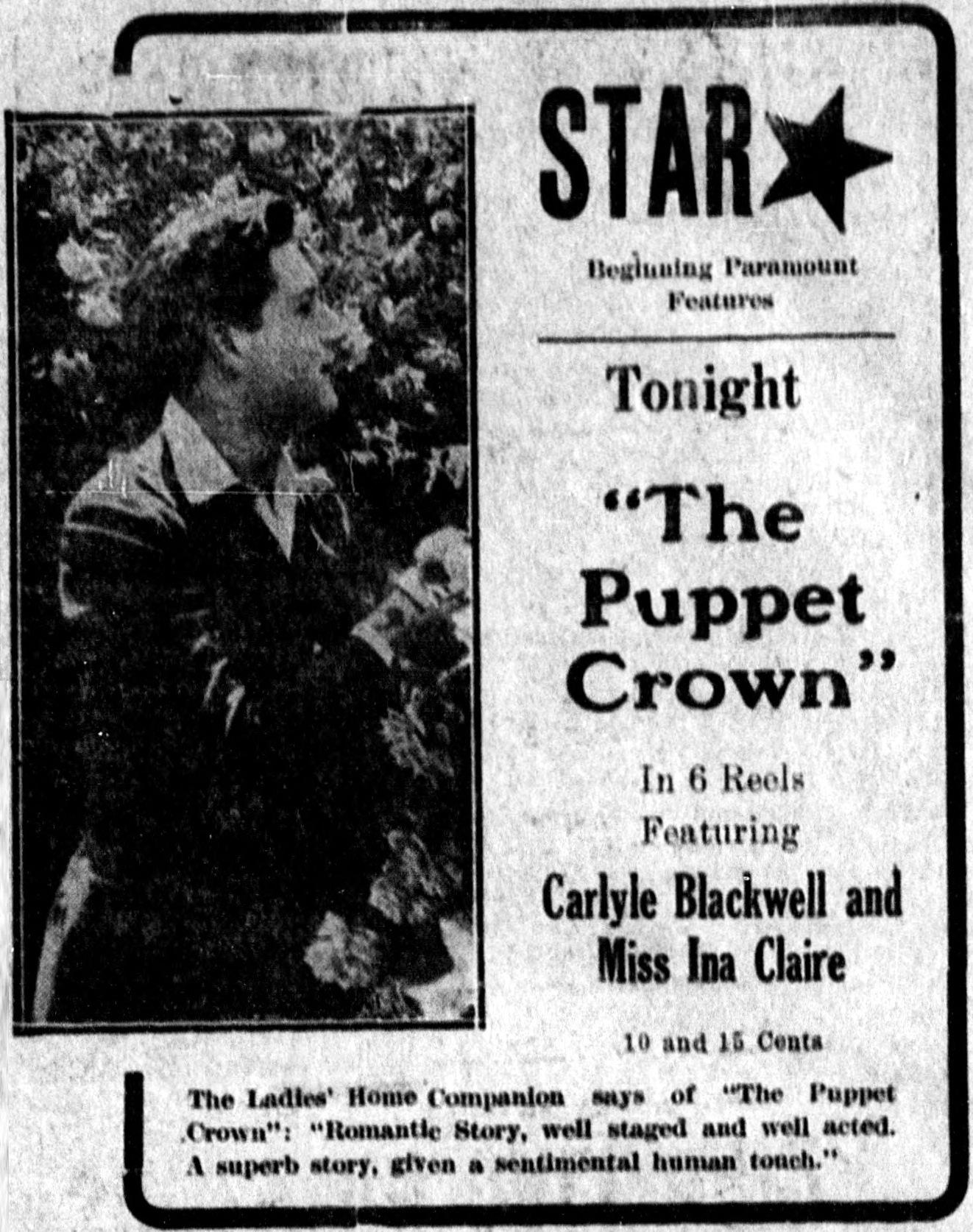
- Newspaper advertisement
- Directed by: George Melford
- Screenplay by: Harold MacGrath; William C. deMille
- Produced by: Jesse L. Lasky
- Starring: Ina Claire; Carlyle Blackwell; Chris Lynton; Cleo Ridgely; Horace B. Carpenter; John Abraham
- Cinematography: Percy Hilburn (Fr)
- Production company: Jesse L. Lasky Feature Play Company
- Distributed by: Paramount Pictures
- Release date: July 29, 1915
- Country: United States
- Language: English

The Puppet Crown is a 1915 American drama silent film directed by George Melford and written by Harold MacGrath and William C. deMille. The film stars Ina Claire, Carlyle Blackwell, Chris Lynton, Cleo Ridgely, Horace B. Carpenter and John Abraham. The film was released on July 29, 1915, by Paramount Pictures.

== Plot ==
The Puppet Crown was advertised as a film about a princess who lost her throne but gained a husband.

== Cast ==
- Ina Claire as Princess Alexia
- Carlyle Blackwell as Bob Carewe
- Chris Lynton as King Leopold
- Cleo Ridgely as Duchess Sylvia
- Horace B. Carpenter as Count Mallendorf
- John Abraham as Marshal Kampf
- George Gebhardt as Colonel Beauvais
- Tom Forman as Lieutenant Von Mitter
- Marjorie Daw as Countess Elsa

== Preservation status ==
- The film is now lost.
