= Don't Change Your Husband =

1919 film

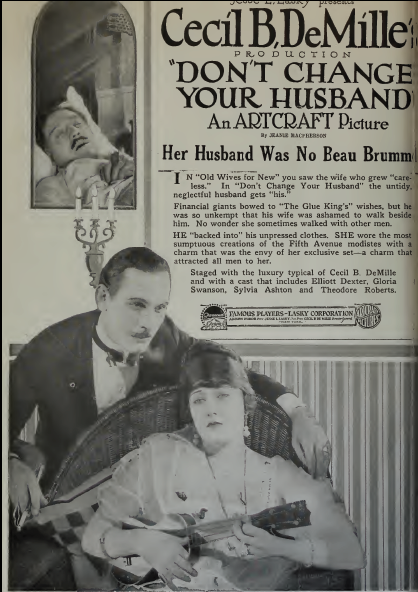
- Ad for the film from a 1919 issue of Film Daily
- Directed by: Cecil B. DeMille; Sam Wood (asst. director)
- Story by: Jeanie MacPherson
- Produced by: Jesse L. Lasky
- Starring: Elliott Dexter; Gloria Swanson
- Cinematography: Alvin Wyckoff
- Edited by: Anne Bauchens
- Production companies: Famous Players-Lasky; Artcraft Pictures Corp.
- Distributed by: Paramount Pictures
- Release date: January 26, 1919
- Running time: 86 minutes
- Country: United States
- Language: Silent (English intertitles)
- Budget: $73,922.14
- Box office: $292,134.10

Don't Change Your Husband is a 1919 American silent comedy film directed by Cecil B. DeMille and starring Gloria Swanson. The film was the third of six "marriage films" directed by DeMille and the first DeMille film starring Gloria Swanson. A Chinese silent film, Don't Change Your Husband (1929), used the same English title, and a similar plot arc.

== Plot ==
Don't Change Your Husband (1919)

Based upon a description in a film magazine, Leila Porter has grown tired of her husband James Denby Porter, the glue king, as she is romantic but he is prosaic. Moreover, he is careless of his personal appearance, gets cigar ash in the carpet, and eats green onions before he tries to kiss her. She obtains a divorce and then marries James' friend Schuyler Van Sutphen, but discovers that Van Sutphen is a real beast. When she later discovers that her ex-husband has changed as a result of the divorce, still loves her, and would be happy to have her back, Leila divorces once again in order to remarry James.

== Cast ==
- Elliott Dexter as James Denby Porter
- Gloria Swanson as Leila Porter
- Lew Cody as Schuyler Van Sutphen
- Sylvia Ashton as Mrs. Huckney
- Theodore Roberts as The Bishop, Rt. Rev. Thomas Thornby
- Julia Faye as Nanette aka Toodles
- James Neill as Butler
- Ted Shawn as Faun
- Irving Cummings as Undetermined Role (uncredited)
- Clarence Geldart as Manager of Gambling Club (uncredited)
- Raymond Hatton as Croupier at Gambling Club (uncredited)
- Jack Mulhall as Member of Gambling Club (uncredited)
- Guy Oliver as Mr. Frankel, Dressmaker (uncredited)
- Sam Wood as Undetermined Role (uncredited)

== Preservation and Availability ==
Complete prints of Don't Change Your Husband are held by:

- George Eastman Museum, on 35 mm
- Cinémathèque Québécoise, on 35 mm
- Cinematheque Royale de Belgique
- Swedish Film Institute
- Archives du Film du CNC
- Library of Congress, on DVD.

The film was released on DVD by Image Entertainment with The Golden Chance.
