= Lou Tellegen =

Dutch-American actor (1883–1934)

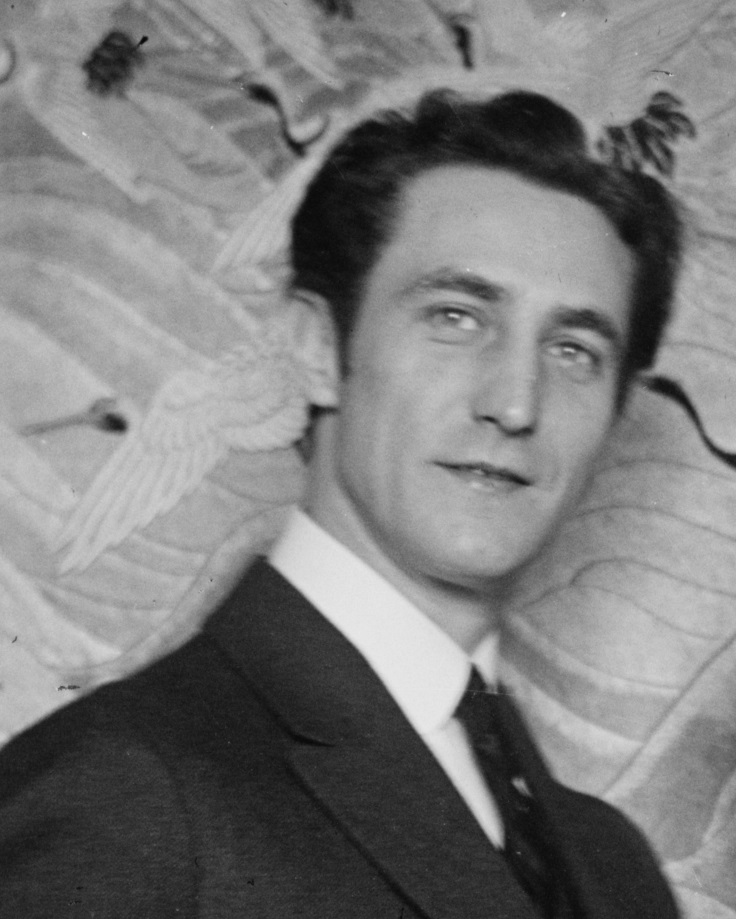
- Tellegen in 1916
- Born: Isidor Louis Bernard Edmon van Dommelen; November 26, 1883; Sint-Oedenrode, Netherlands
- Died: October 29, 1934 (aged 50); Hollywood, Los Angeles, California, U.S.
- Occupations: Actor, director, screenwriter
- Years active: 1903 – 1934
- Spouses: Jeanne de Brouckère (m. 1903; div. 1905) Geraldine Farrar (m. 1916; div. 1923) Nina Romano (m. 1923; div. 1928) Eve Casanova (m. 1930; div. 1932)

Lou Tellegen (born Isidor Louis Bernard Edmon van Dommelen; November 26, 1883 – October 29, 1934) was a Dutch-born stage and film actor, film director and screenwriter.

== Early life ==
Lou Tellegen was born as Isidor Louis Bernard Edmon van Dommelen in Sint-Oedenrode, the illegitimate child of a separated, but not divorced, lieutenant of the West-Indian Army Isidore Louis Bernard Edmon Tellegen (1836–1902) and his partner Anna Maria van Dommelen (1844–1917), widow of Eduard Hendrik Jan Storm van 's Gravezande.

He made his stage debut in Amsterdam in 1903, and over the next few years built a reputation to the point where he was invited to perform in Paris, eventually co-starring in several roles with Sarah Bernhardt, with whom he was involved romantically. In 1910, he made his motion picture debut alongside Bernhardt in La dame aux camélias, a silent film made in France and based on the play by Alexandre Dumas, fils.

== Career ==
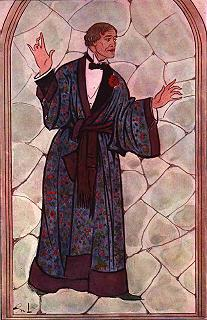
Tellegen caricatured in Vanity Fair, 1913

In 1910, Tellegen and Bernhardt travelled to the United States, where The New York Times first published, and then retracted, the announcement of their impending marriage. (She was 39 years his senior.) Back in France, in 1912 they made their second film together, Les Amours de la reine Élisabeth (Queen Elizabeth), and the following year, Adrienne Lecouvreur. The latter is considered a lost film.

In the summer of 1913, Tellegen went to London where he produced and starred in a play based on Oscar Wilde's novel The Picture of Dorian Gray. Invited back to the United States, Tellegen worked in theatre and made his first American film in 1915, titled The Explorer, followed by The Unknown, both with Dorothy Davenport as his co-star. Considered one of the best-looking actors on screen, he followed up with three straight films starring alongside Geraldine Farrar. In 1920, Tellegen authored and starred in the play Blind Youth which played on tour in Toronto at the Princess Theatre.

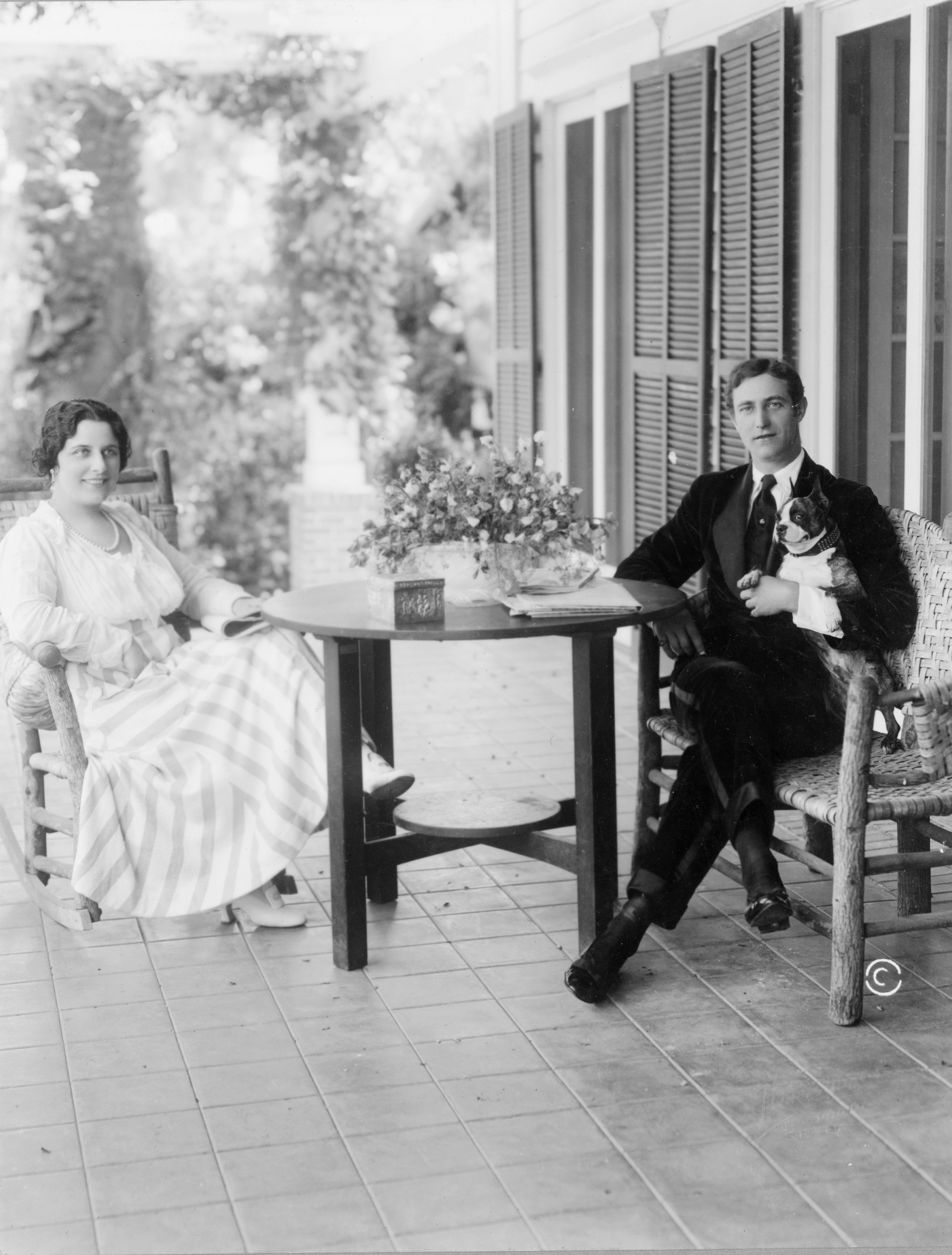
Tellegen with second wife, opera soprano and actress Geraldine Farrar, c. 1916

== Personal life ==
Tellegen married a total of four times, first to a sculptor in 1903 (this union produced a daughter), and second to Farrar in 1916. His marriage to Farrar ended in divorce in 1923. His third marriage was to actress Nina Romano (real name: Isabel Craven Dilworth), with whom he had a son. His fourth marriage was to silent film star Eve Casanova (real name Julia Horne). He became an American citizen in 1918.

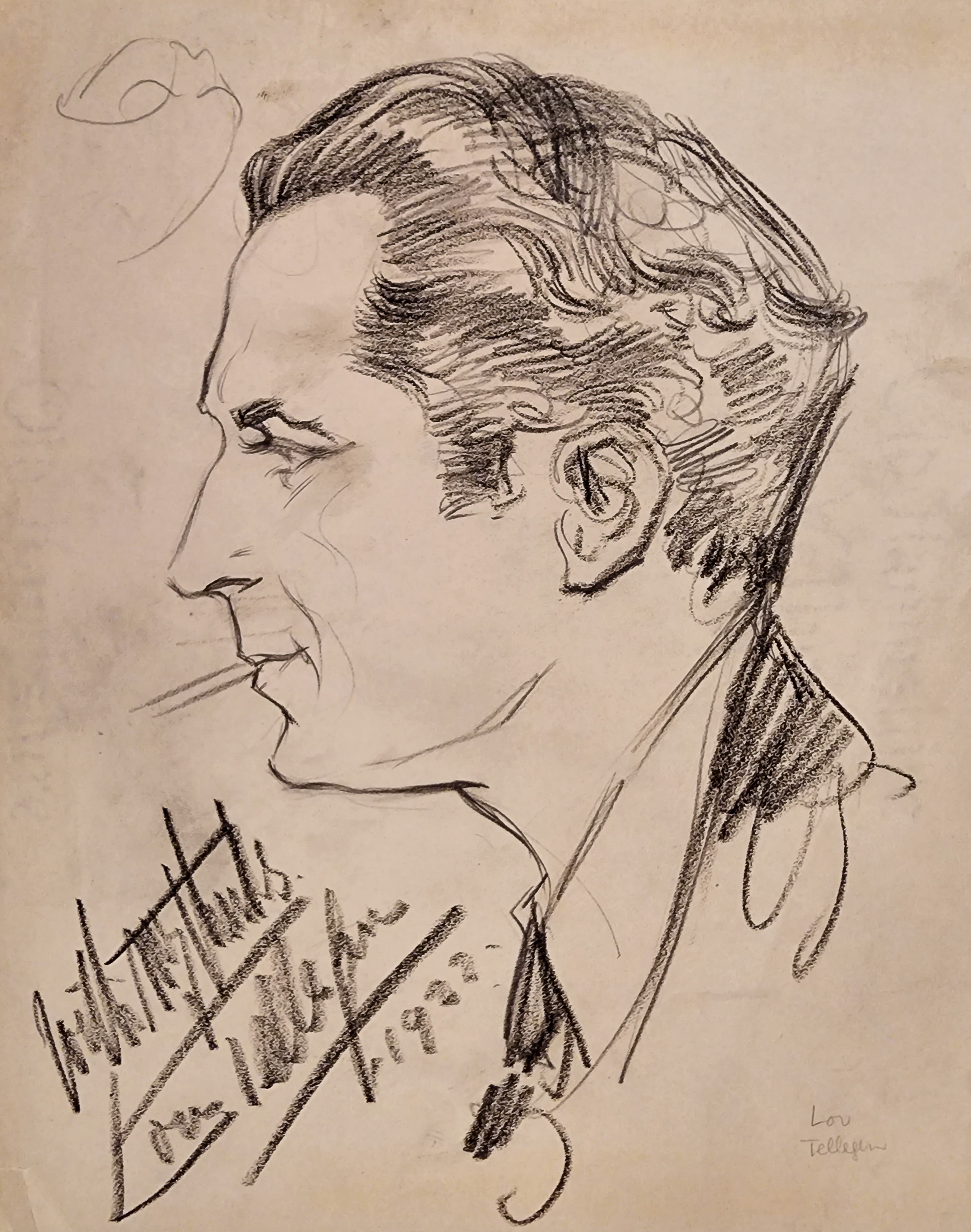
Lou Tellegen autographed drawing by Manuel Rosenberg for the Cincinnati Post, 1922

On December 25, 1929, Tellegen sustained burns to his face when he fell asleep while smoking. At the time, he was preparing for an out-of-town tryout for a play. To repair the damage, Tellegen underwent extensive plastic surgery.

== Later career and death ==
In 1931, he wrote his autobiography Women Have Been Kind.

By 1931, Tellegen's popularity had declined and he had trouble securing acting work. He was also deeply in debt and filed for bankruptcy. Around this time, Tellegen was diagnosed with cancer, though this information was kept from him. Tellegen soon grew despondent.

On October 29, 1934, while a guest of Edna Cudahy, the widow of meat packing heir Jack Cudahy, at the Cudahy Mansion at 1844 North Vine Street in Hollywood (the site of the Vine-Franklin underpass of the Hollywood Freeway), Tellegen locked himself in the bathroom, then shaved and powdered his face. While standing in front of a full-length mirror, he stabbed himself in the heart seven times with a pair of sewing scissors. Some accounts claim Tellegen was surrounded by newspaper clippings of his career at the time of his suicide.

When asked to comment on Tellegen's death former wife Geraldine Farrar replied "Why should that interest me?" Tellegen was cremated and his remains were scattered at sea.

== Filmography ==
Year	Title	Role	Notes
1911	La Dame aux camélias	Armand Duval	
1912	Les Amours de la reine Élisabeth	Robert Devereux, Earl of Essex	Alternative titles: Queen Elizabeth; La Reine Élisabeth
1913	Adrienne Lecouvreur		Alternative title: An Actress's Romance, lost film
1915	The Explorer	Alec McKenzie	Credited as Lou-Tellegen, lost film
1915	The Unknown	Richard Farquhar	
1916	The Victory of Conscience	Louis, Count De Tavannes	
1916	The Victoria Cross	Major Ralph Seton	
1917	The Black Wolf	The Black Wolf	Lost
1917	The Long Trail	Andre Dubois	Lost
1917	What Money Can't Buy	–	Director; Lost
1918	The Thing We Love	–	Director, Lost film
1919	The World and Its Woman	Prince Michael Orbeliana	Alternative title: The Golden Song
1919	Flame of the Desert	Sheik Essad	
1920	The Woman and the Puppet	Don Mateo	
1920	Blind Youth	–	Writer, undetermined/presumably Lost
1924	Let Not Man Put Asunder	Dick Lechmere	Lost film
1924	Between Friends	David Drene	Lost film
1924	Single Wives	Martin Prayle	
1924	The Breath of Scandal	Charles Hale	Lost
1924	Those Who Judge	John Dawson	Lost
1924	Greater Than Marriage	John Masters	
1925	The Redeeming Sin	Lupin	Lost film
1925	Fair Play	Bruce Elliot	Alternative title: The Danger Zone
1925	The Verdict	Victor Ronsard	
1925	Parisian Nights	Jean	
1925	After Business Hours	John King	
1925	The Sporting Chance	Darrell Thorton	
1925	Parisian Love	Pierre Marcel	
1925	With This Ring	Rufus Van Buren	
1925	East Lynne	Sir Francis Levison	
1925	Borrowed Finery	Harlan	
1926	The Outsider	Anton Ragatzy	
1926	Siberia	Egor Kaplan	Lost film
1926	The Silver Treasure	Sotillo, the Bandit	Lost film
1926	3 Bad Men	Sheriff Layne Hunter	
1926	Womanpower	The Broker	
1927	Stage Madness	Pierre Doumier	
1927	The Princess From Hoboken	Prince Anton Balakrieff	Lost film
1927	The Little Firebrand	Harley Norcross	
1927	Married Alive	James Duxbury	Lost film
1928	No Other Woman	–	Director, lost film
1930	To oneiron tou glyptou		Writer, director Alternative title: Pygmalion kai Galateia
1931	Enemies of the Law	Eddie Swan	
1934	Caravane		Uncredited; French-language version of Fox production Caravan
1935	Together We Live	Bischofsky	
