= The Explorer (film) =

1915 film

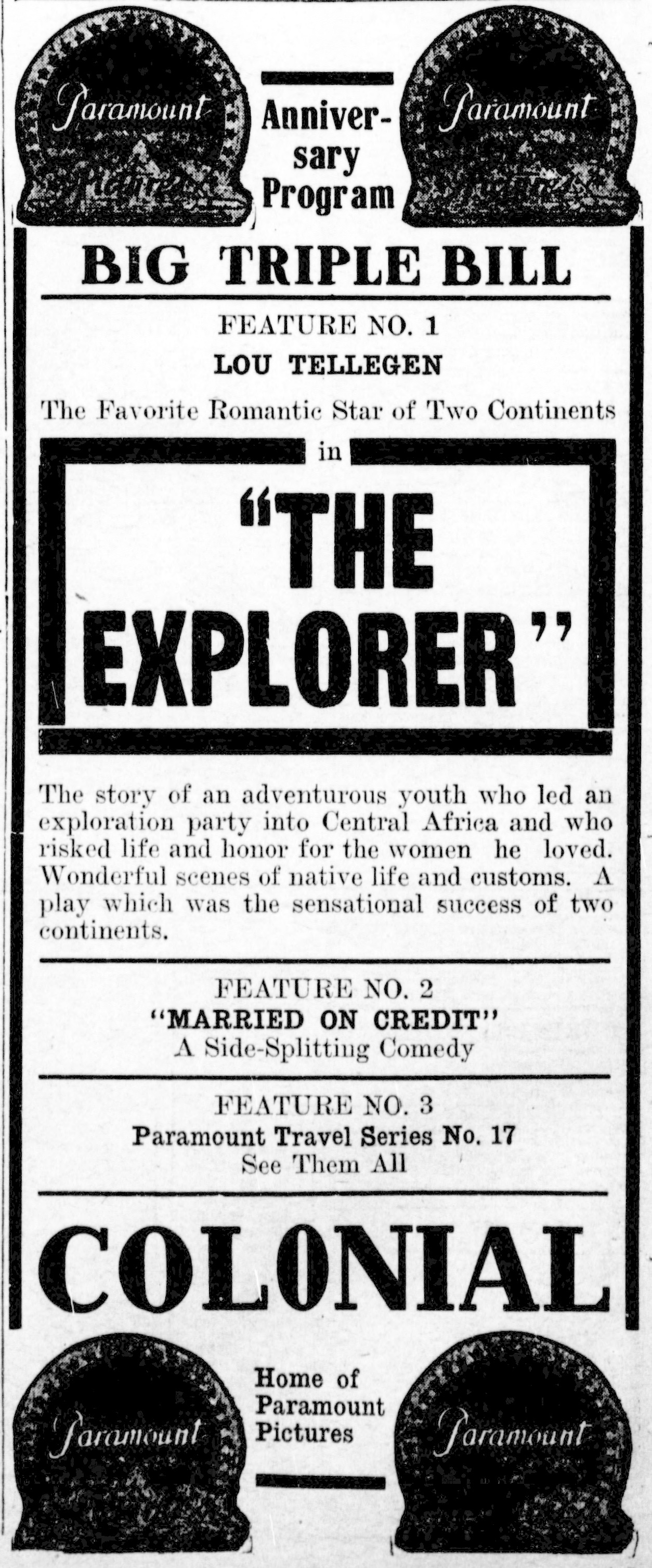
- Contemporary advertisement
- Directed by: George Melford
- Screenplay by: W. Somerset Maugham; William C. deMille
- Produced by: Jesse L. Lasky
- Starring: Lou Tellegen; Tom Forman; Dorothy Davenport; James Neill; Horace B. Carpenter
- Cinematography: Percy Hilburn (fr)
- Production company: Jesse L. Lasky Feature Play Company
- Distributed by: Paramount Pictures
- Release date: September 27, 1915
- Country: United States
- Language: English

The Explorer is a lost 1915 American adventure silent film directed by George Melford and written by W. Somerset Maugham and William C. deMille. The film stars Lou Tellegen, Tom Forman, Dorothy Davenport, James Neill and Horace B. Carpenter. The film was released on September 27, 1915, by Paramount Pictures.

== Plot ==
The film was advertised as a story of an adventurous youth who led an exploration party into Central Africa, risking life and honor for the women he loved.

== Cast ==
- Lou Tellegen as Alec McKenzie
- Tom Forman as George Allerton
- Dorothy Davenport as Lucy Allerton
- James Neill as Dr. Adamson
- Horace B. Carpenter as McInnery
