= Flame of the Desert =

1919 film

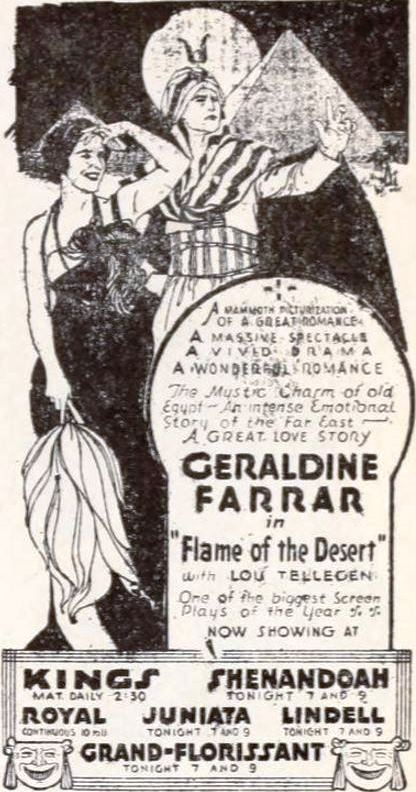
- Newspaper advertisement
- Directed by: Reginald Barker
- Written by: Charles A. Logue (story); Richard Schayer (scenario)
- Produced by: Samuel Goldwyn
- Starring: Geraldine Farrar; Lou Tellegen
- Cinematography: Frank B. Good; Percy Hilburn
- Distributed by: Goldwyn Pictures
- Release date: October 26, 1919
- Running time: 50 minutes; 5 reels
- Country: United States
- Language: Silent (English intertitles)

Flame of the Desert is a 1919 American silent drama film starring Geraldine Farrar and Lou Tellegen. It was directed by Reginald Barker and produced by Samuel Goldwyn.

== Cast ==
- Geraldine Farrar as Lady Isabelle Channing
- Lou Tellegen as Sheik Essad
- Alec B. Francis as Sir John Carleton
- Edythe Chapman as Lady Snowden
- Casson Ferguson as Sir Charles Channing
- Macey Harlam as Aboul Bey
- Syn De Conde as Abdullah
- Milton Ross as Sheik
- Miles Dobson as Sheik Imbrim
- Jim Mason as Desert Sheik
- Louis Durham as Desert Sheik
- Eli Stanton as Ullah (credited as Ely Stanton)
- Jack Carlyle (unidentified role) (credited as J. Montgomery Carlyle)

== Preservation status ==
Prints of the film exist at the Library of Congress and Cineteca Nazionale in Rome.
