= Stolen Goods (film) =

1915 film by George Melford

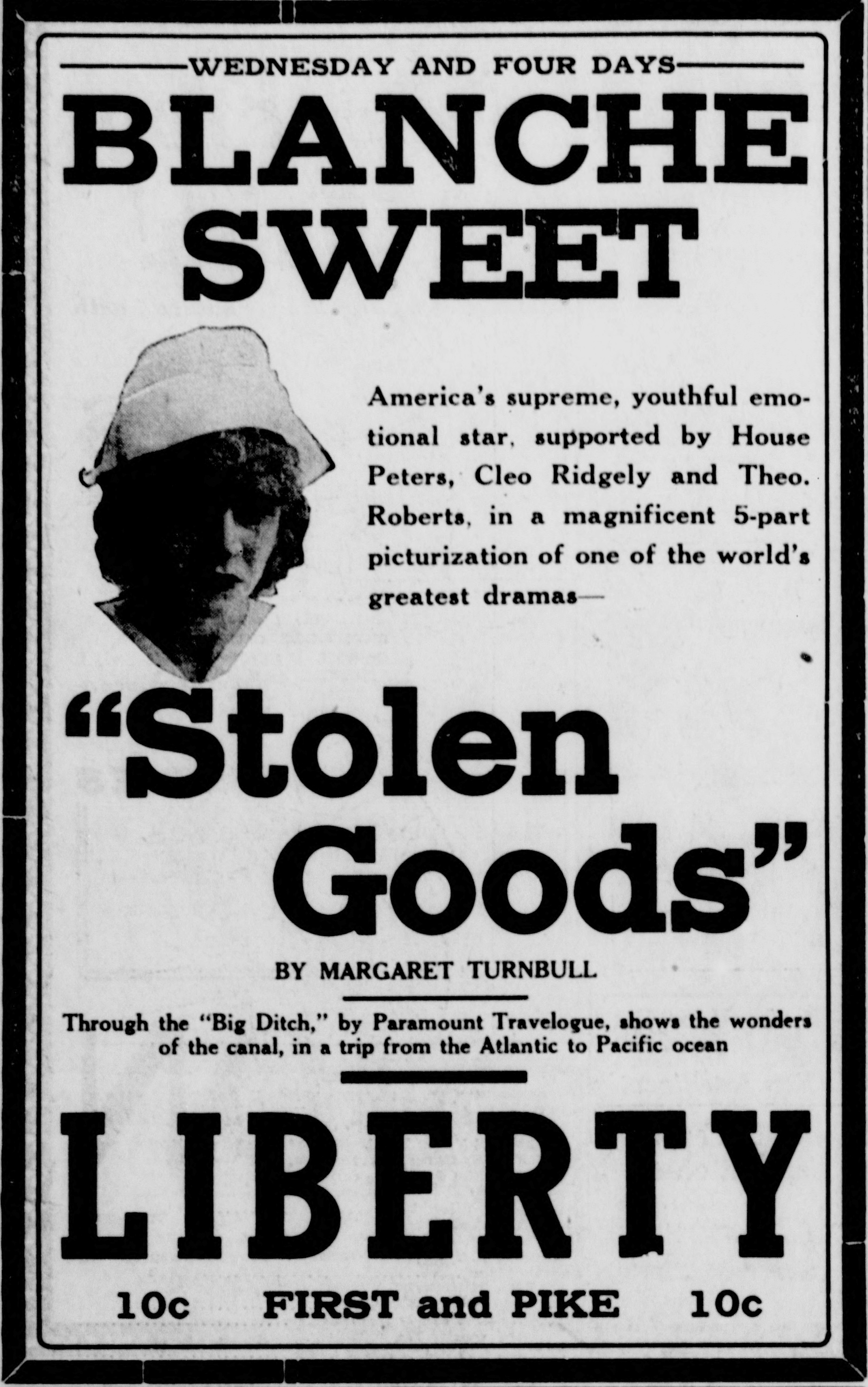
- Newspaper advertisement
- Directed by: George Melford
- Screenplay by: Margaret Turnbull
- Produced by: Jesse L. Lasky
- Starring: Blanche Sweet; Cleo Ridgely; House Peters, Sr. Horace B. Carpenter; Sydney Deane; Theodore Roberts
- Production company: Jesse L. Lasky Feature Play Company
- Distributed by: Paramount Pictures
- Release date: May 24, 1915
- Country: United States
- Language: English

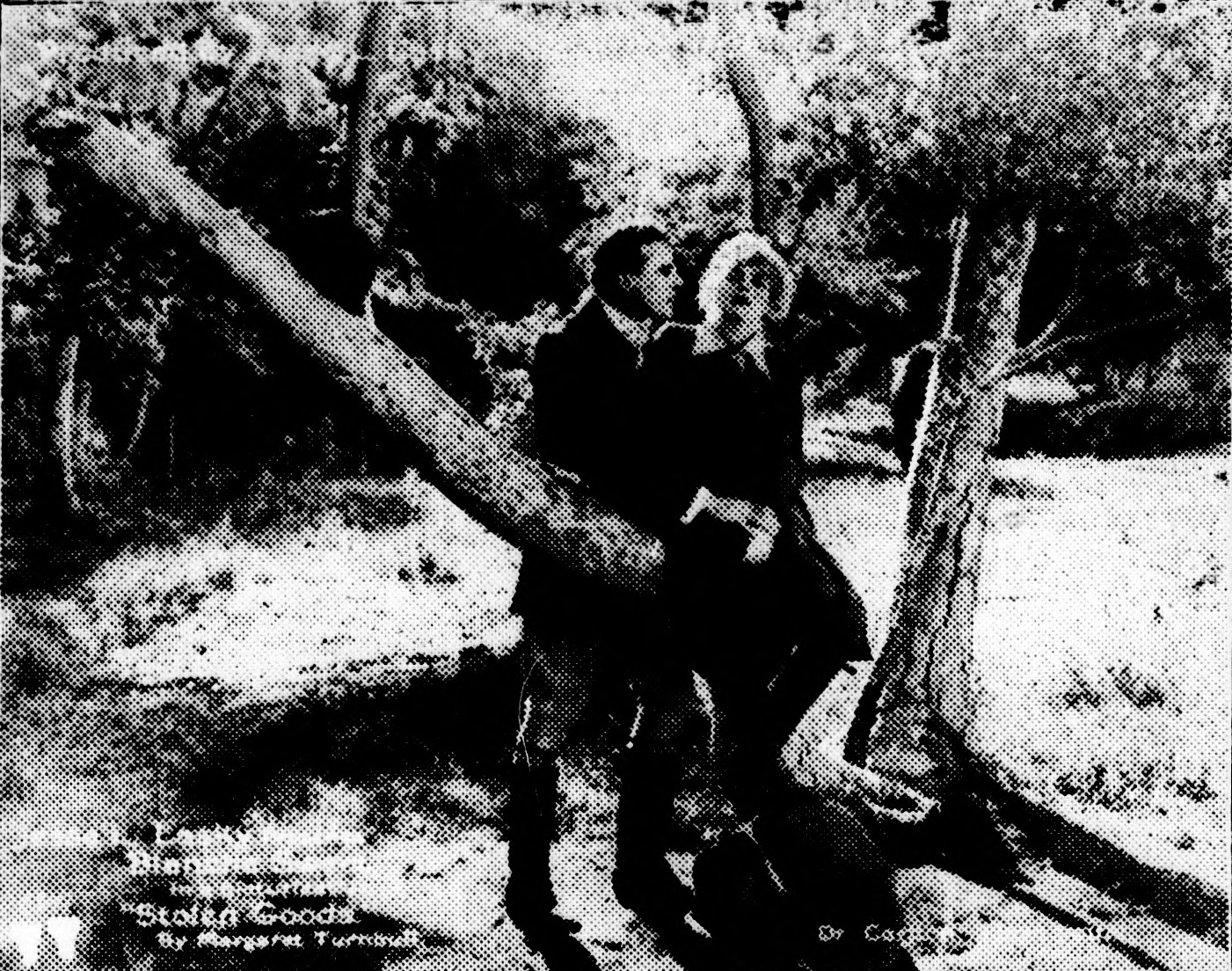
Scene from the film

Stolen Goods is a lost 1915 American drama silent film directed by George Melford and written by Margaret Turnbull. The film stars Blanche Sweet, Cleo Ridgely, House Peters, Sr., Horace B. Carpenter, Sydney Deane and Theodore Roberts. The film was released on May 24, 1915, by Paramount Pictures.

== Plot ==
An orphan named Margery (Blanche Sweet) is working a dressmaking company in New York. She is sent to prison when a rich kleptomaniac named Helen North (Cleo Ridgely) puts some stolen lace in Margery's handbag. After leaving the prison she becomes a nurse for some time until the hospital she works at finds out she has a record. She leaves and becomes a nurse at a Red Cross emergency hospital in Belgium. At the same time, Helen has come to Belgium to take care of her sick father. After he dies, she is left without any money. She is planning to leave for California to live with her father's wealthy friend when an airship bomb sends Helen to the hospital Margery is working at. Another shell explodes and makes Margery think Helen is dead. Margery takes Helen's identity to go to California. She falls in love with a doctor named Richard Carlton (House Peters, Sr.) and right before they are supposed to get married Helen shows up. In order to stop people from taking Helen to the insane asylum, Margery confesses the truth. Carlton still wants to marry her anyway.

== Cast ==
- Blanche Sweet as Margery Huntley
- Cleo Ridgely as Helen North
- House Peters, Sr. as Richard Carlton
- Horace B. Carpenter as French surgeon
- Sydney Deane as Mr. North
- Theodore Roberts as German surgeon major
