= Dangerous Pastime =

1922 film

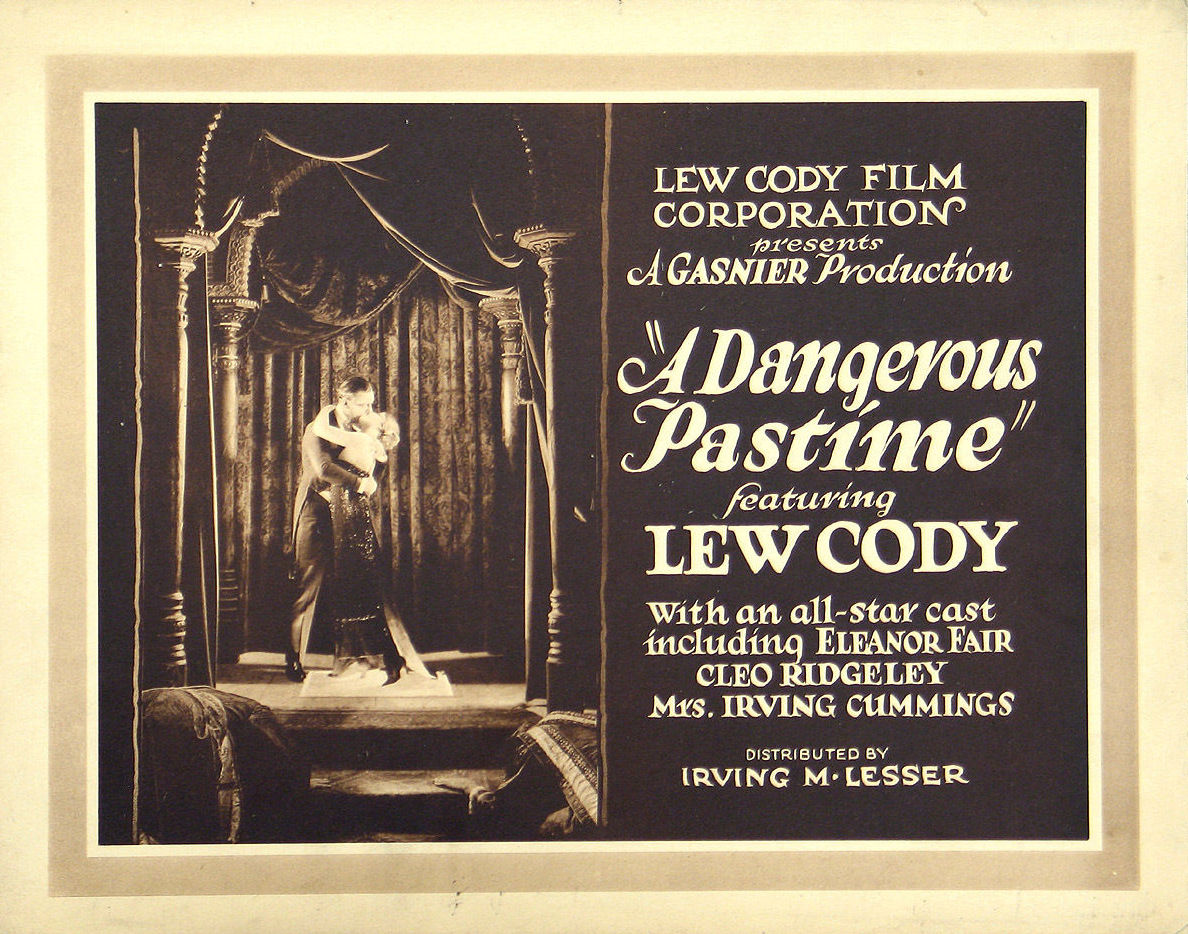
- Directed by: James W. Horne
- Written by: Wyndham Martin; H. Tipton Steck
- Produced by: Louis J. Gasnier
- Starring: Lew Cody; Cleo Ridgely; Elinor Fair
- Production company: Louis J. Gasnier Productions
- Release date: February 4, 1922
- Running time: 50 minutes
- Country: United States
- Languages: Silent; English intertitles

Dangerous Pastime is a 1922 American silent drama film directed by James W. Horne and starring Lew Cody, Cleo Ridgely and Elinor Fair. Originally produced under the title Wait for Me it is also known as A Dangerous Pastime.

== Cast ==
- Lew Cody as Barry Adams
- Cleo Ridgely as Mrs. Stowell
- Elinor Fair as Celia
- Ruth Cummings as Mrs. Gregor

== Bibliography ==
- Connelly, Robert B. The Silents: Silent Feature Films, 1910-36, Volume 40, Issue 2. December Press, 1998.
- Munden, Kenneth White. The American Film Institute Catalog of Motion Pictures Produced in the United States, Part 1. University of California Press, 1997.
