= Jeanie MacPherson =

American actress (1886–1946)

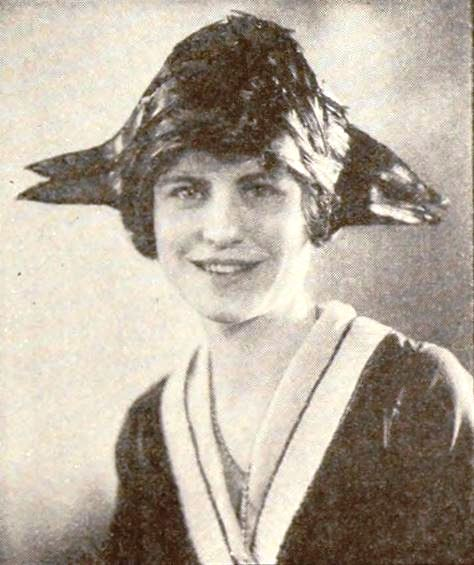
- MacPherson in 1921
- Born: Abbie Jean Macpherson; May 18, 1886; Boston, Massachusetts, U.S.
- Died: August 26, 1946 (aged 60); Los Angeles, California, U.S.
- Resting place: Hollywood Forever Cemetery
- Occupations: Actress; screenwriter; director
- Years active: 1908–1917 (acting); 1913–1946 (screenwriting)
- Notable work: Her collaborations with director Cecil B. DeMille
- Awards: Hollywood Walk of Fame

Abbie Jean MacPherson (May 18, 1886 – August 26, 1946) was an American silent actress, writer and director. She is known for her collaborations with directors D. W. Griffith and Cecil B. DeMille, and was a founding member of the Academy of Motion Picture Arts and Sciences.

== Early life ==
Abbie Jean MacPherson was born in Boston, Massachusetts to a wealthy family of European (Spanish, Scottish and French) descent. Her parents were John S. MacPherson and Evangeline C. Tomlinson. As a teenager, she was sent to Mademoiselle DeJacque's school in Paris, but returned to the United States when her family could no longer afford the fees.

MacPherson earned a degree from the Kenwood Institute in Chicago and began working as a dancer and stage performer. MacPherson began her theatrical career as part of the chorus in the Chicago Opera House. Over the next few years, she took singing lessons and worked several theater-related jobs.

== Film career ==
MacPherson made her film debut in the 1908 film The Fatal Hour, directed by D. W. Griffith. She acted in many controversial roles in which she portrayed characters of ethnicities other than her own; due to her dark hair, she was often cast in Gypsy or Spanish roles. From 1908 to 1917, she amassed 146 acting credits. She saw her time with Griffith as her "first glimmer of the possibilities in the new industry [and] from those days on [she had] seen a variety of attitudes toward the scriptwriters."

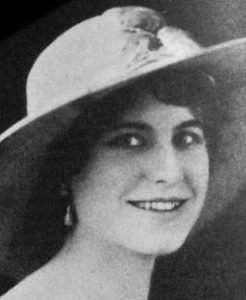
A young Jeanie

After working with Griffith, MacPherson began working with the Universal Company, where she starred in more prominent roles. In 1913, she wrote, directed and starred in The Tarantula, about a Spanish-Mexican girl, known as the Tarantula, who seduced men before killing them. With this film, she became the youngest director in motion picture history. The Tarantula is the only film she directed.

MacPherson continued working for the Universal Company for two years, until her failing health caused her to leave. Upon her recovery, MacPherson began working for Lasky Studios; however, she quickly sought out Cecil B. DeMille to see if she could act in his films. He told her, "I am not interested in star MacPherson, but I am in writer MacPherson"; and from that point on, she focused on writing.

DeMille and MacPherson formed a partnership that some scholars consider to be one of the industry's most influential and long-lasting. MacPherson wrote the scripts for 30 of DeMille's next 34 films. Some of their most notable collaborations are Rose of the Rancho (1914) starring Bessie Barriscale, The Girl of the Golden West starring Mabel Van Buren, The Cheat (1915) starring Sessue Hayakawa, The Golden Chance (1915) starring Wallace Reid, Joan the Woman (1916) starring Geraldine Farrar, A Romance of the Redwoods (1917) with Mary Pickford, The Little American again starring Pickford, and The Woman God Forgot (1917) again starring Farrar.

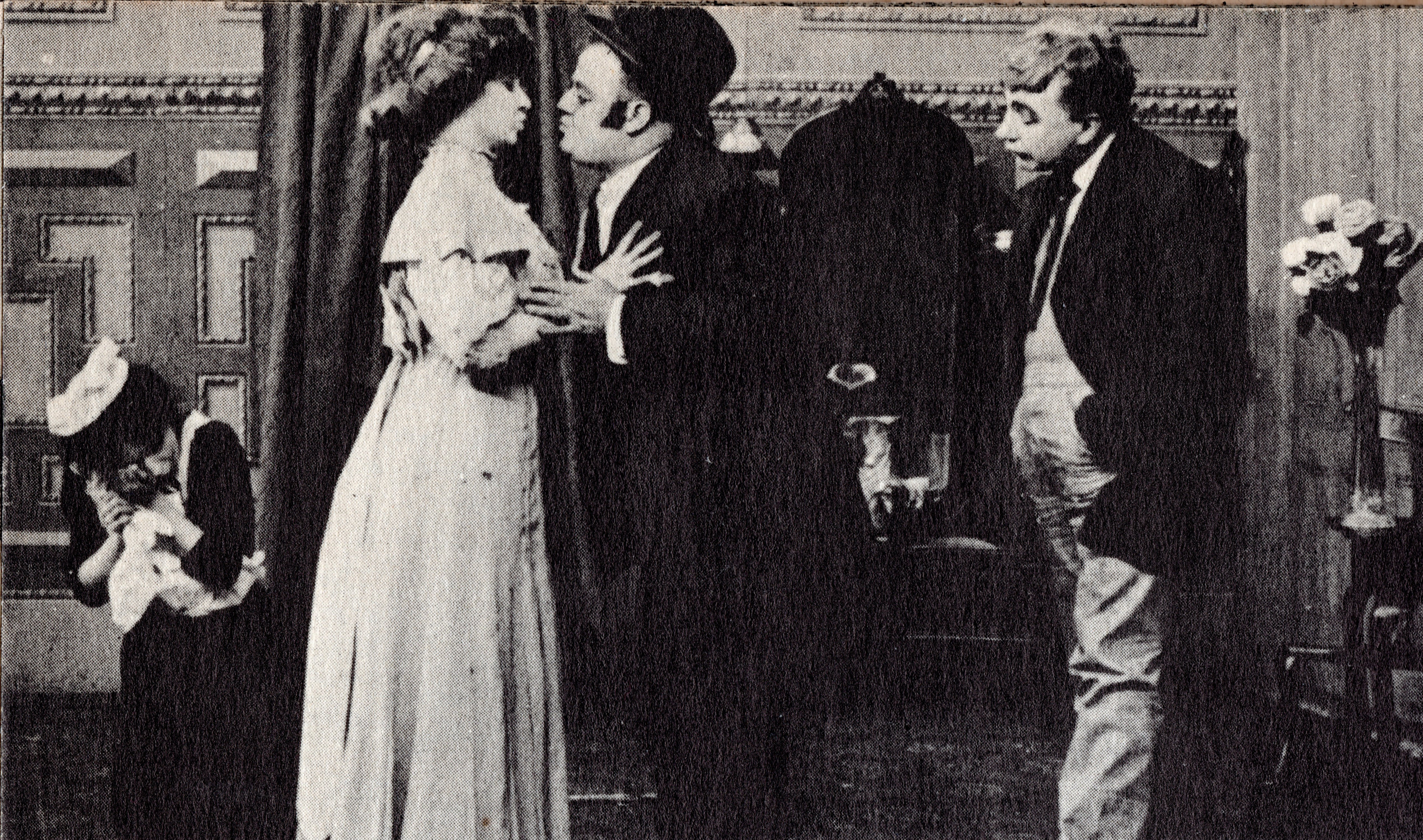
(L-R): Jeanie MacPherson, Florence Lawrence, John Cumpson and Tony O'Sullivan in Mrs. Jones Entertains (1909)

In 1921, MacPherson told a reporter, "I shall always be grateful for Mr. DeMille's assistance. He is a hard taskmaster, and he demands that a thing shall be perfect... It was hard, but it taught me that anything worth doing at all was worth doing perfectly."

MacPherson believed that motion picture owed its psychology to D. W. Griffith and its dramatic picture scenario construction to DeMille. In 1927, she became a founding member of the Academy of Motion Picture Arts and Sciences.

== Personal life ==
MacPherson and DeMille's relationship was met with speculation for years. DeMille's niece, Agnes de Mille, later confirmed that MacPherson was one of her uncle's three mistresses.

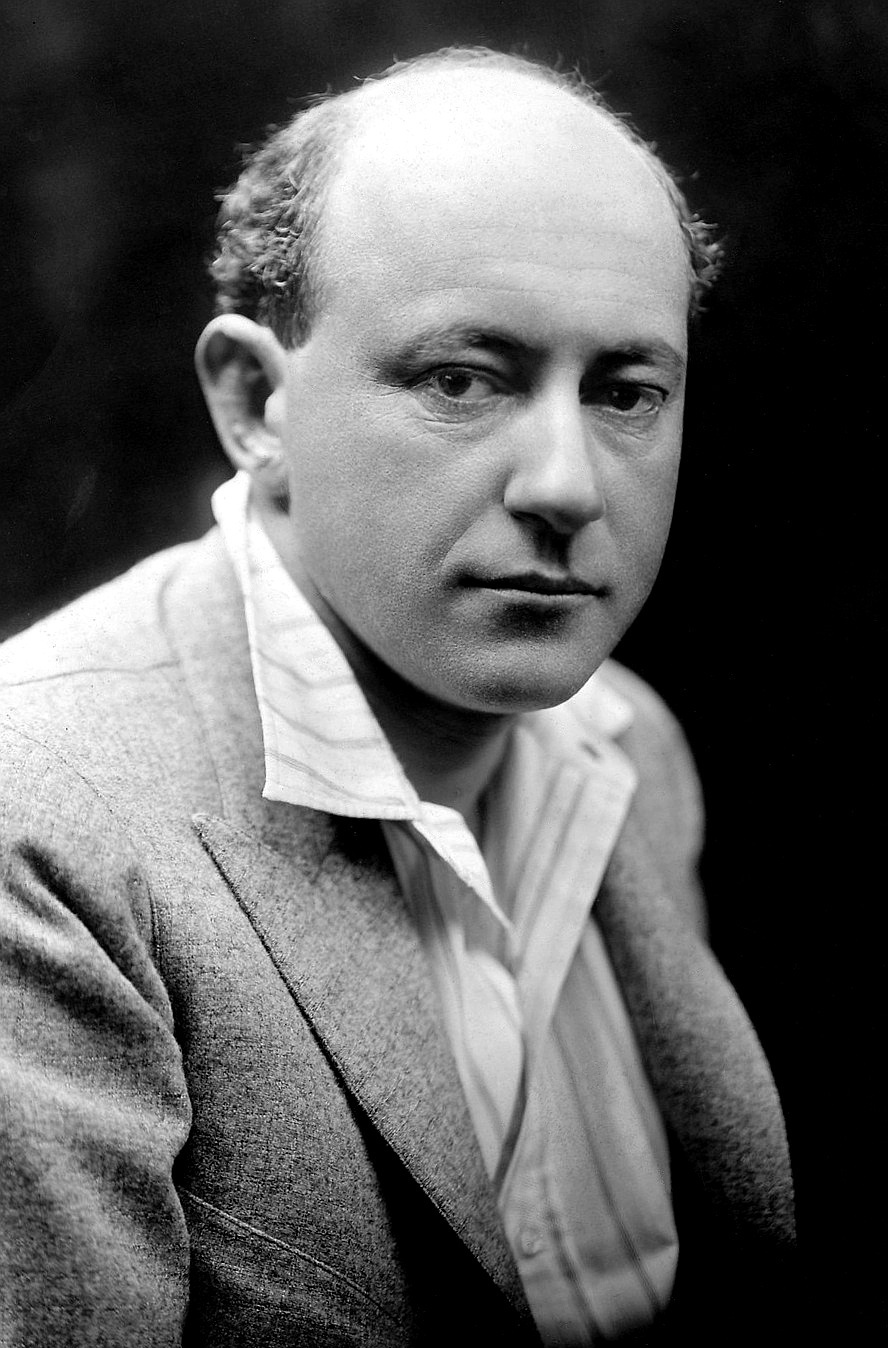
Cecil B. DeMille

MacPherson was a pilot and sought to take daily flights. She was the only woman to pilot the plane of Ormer Locklear.

In 1946, MacPherson became ill with cancer while researching Unconquered (1947), a historical drama, and had to stop work. She died that August in Los Angeles at age 60 and was buried at the Hollywood Forever Cemetery in Hollywood. She was awarded a star on the Hollywood Walk of Fame at 6150 Hollywood Blvd.

== Filmography ==
=== As Performer ===
Year	Films	Credit	Notes
1909	Schneider's Anti-Noise Crusade	Performer	Short
1910	A Mohawk's Way	Performer	Short
1911	The Lonedale Operator	Performer	Short
1911	Fisher Folks	Performer	Short
1915	The Black Box	Performer	Serial

=== As Writer ===
Year	Films	Credit	Notes
1913	The Sea Urchin	Scenario	Short also performer
1913	Red Margaret, Moonshiner	Scenario	Short
1914	The Lie	Scenario	Short
1914	The Desert's Sting	Scenario	Short also performer
1914	The Trap	Scenario	Short also performer
1915	Chimmie Fadden Out West	Screenplay	
1915	Carmen	Scenario	co-written with William DeMille
1915	Temptation	Scenario	co-written with Hector Turnbull & C.B. DeMille
1915	The Captive	Story	co-written with C. B. DeMille
1915	The Cheat	Scenario	co-written with Hector Turnbull
1916	The Golden Chance	Story	co-written with C.B. DeMille
1916	The Love Mask	Story	
1916	The Trail of the Lonesome Pine	Story	credited as Jeanne MacPherson, co-written with C.B. DeMille
1916	The Dream Girl	Scenario	
1916	The Heart of Nora Flynn	Scenario	co-written with Hector Turnbull
1916	Joan the Woman	Scenario	co-written with William DeMille
1917	The Little American	Story & Scenario	co-written with C.B. DeMille
1917	The Woman God Forgot	Story	co-written with William DeMille
1917	The Devil-Stone	Scenario	co-written with Beatrice deMille & Leighton Osmun
1917	A Romance of the Redwoods	Story	co-written with C.B. DeMille
1918	Old Wives for New	Scenario	co-written with C.B. DeMille
1918	Till I Come Back to You	Scenario	
1918	The Whispering Chorus	Scenario	
1919	For Better, For Worse	Scenario	co-written with William DeMille
1919	Don't Change Your Husband	Scenario	
1919	Male and Female	Scenario	
1920	Something to Think About	Story	
1921	The Affairs of Anatol	Scenario	
1921	Forbidden Fruit	Story	
1922	Saturday Night	Story & Scenario	
1922	Manslaughter	Adaptation	
1923	Adam's Rib	Scenario	
1923	The Ten Commandments	Scenario	
1924	Triumph	Adaptation	
1925	The Golden Bed	Screenplay	
1925	The Road to Yesterday	Adaptation	
1926	Red Dice	Adaptation	
1926	Her Man o' War	Scenario	co-written with Charles A. Logue
1926	Young April	Adaptation	co-written with Douglas Z. Doty
1927	The King of Kings	Story & Continuity	
1929	Dynamite	Dialogue	
1929	The Godless Girl	Story	co-written with Ernest Pascal
1930	Madam Satan	Screenplay	
1933	The Devil's Brother	Adaptation	
1935	The Crusades	Treatment	
1938	The Buccaneer	Adaptation	
1941	Land of Liberty	Narration	
1948	Unconquered	Scenario	
