= The Fighting Hope =

1915 film by George Melford

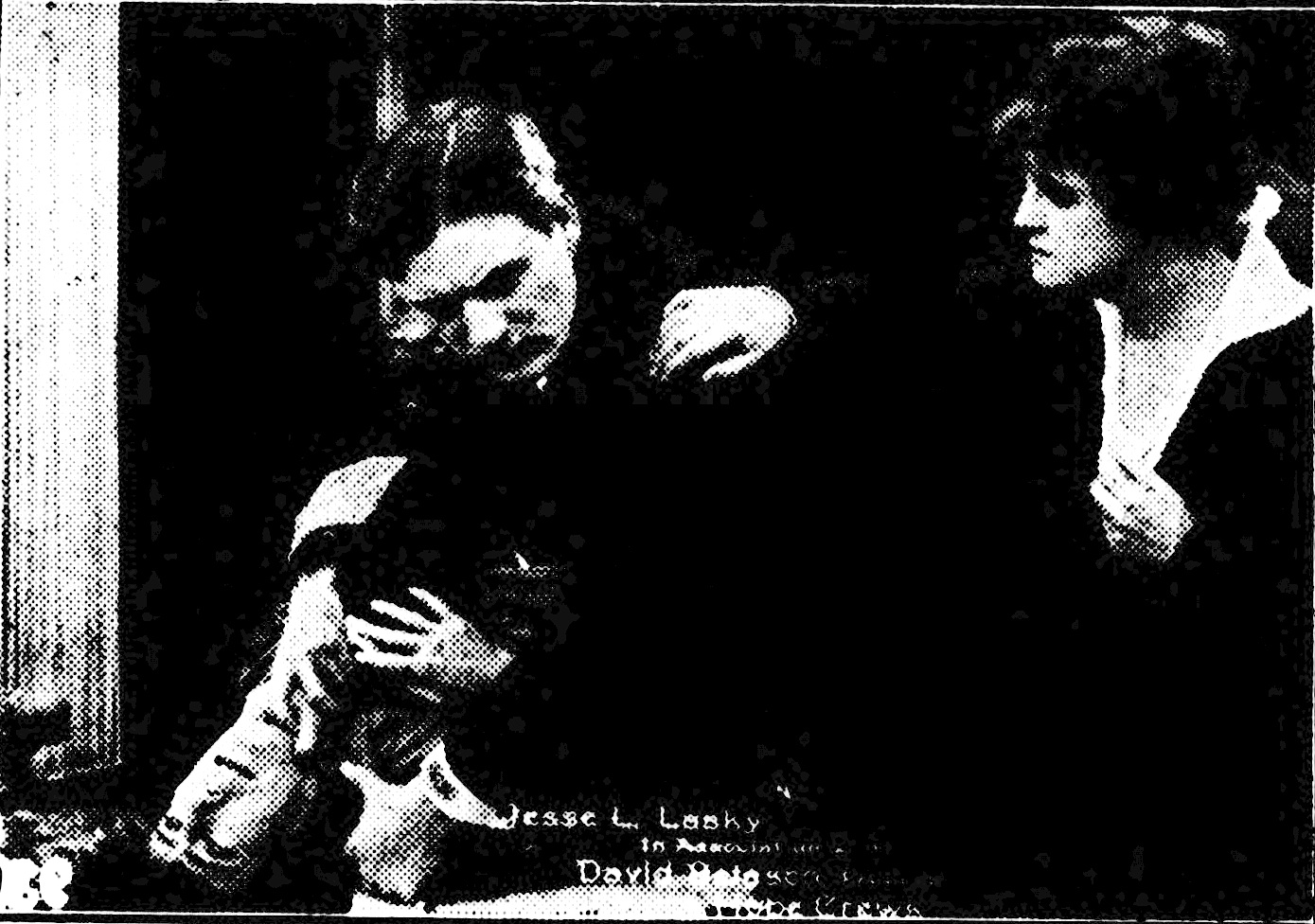
- Scene from the film
- Directed by: George Melford
- Written by: Margaret Turnbull (scenario)
- Based on: The Fighting Hope (play) by William J. Hurlbut
- Produced by: Jesse Lasky
- Starring: Laura Hope Crews
- Distributed by: Paramount Pictures
- Release date: July 19, 1915
- Running time: 5 reels
- Country: USA
- Language: Silent film..(English intertitles)

The Fighting Hope is a 1915 silent film drama directed by George Melford and starring Thomas Meighan and Laura Hope Crews, both in their film debuts. Jesse Lasky produced and Paramount Pictures released. Based on a 1908 play by William J. Hurlbut that was produced by David Belasco.

Incomplete surviving film at BFI Institute (London).

== Cast ==
- George Gebhardt – Robert Granger
- Laura Hope Crews – Anna Granger
- Gerald Ward – Robert Harold Granger
- Thomas Meighan – Burton Temple
- Richard Morris – Craven
- Florence Smythe – Miss Gorham
- Theodore Roberts – Cornelius Brady
- Cleo Ridgely – Rose Fanchom
- Tom Forman – Detective Clark
- William Elmer – Detective Fletcher

== Plot ==
A man has been convicted of fraud, but his wife believes he is innocent and sets out to prove it.
