= The House with the Golden Windows =

1916 film by George Melford

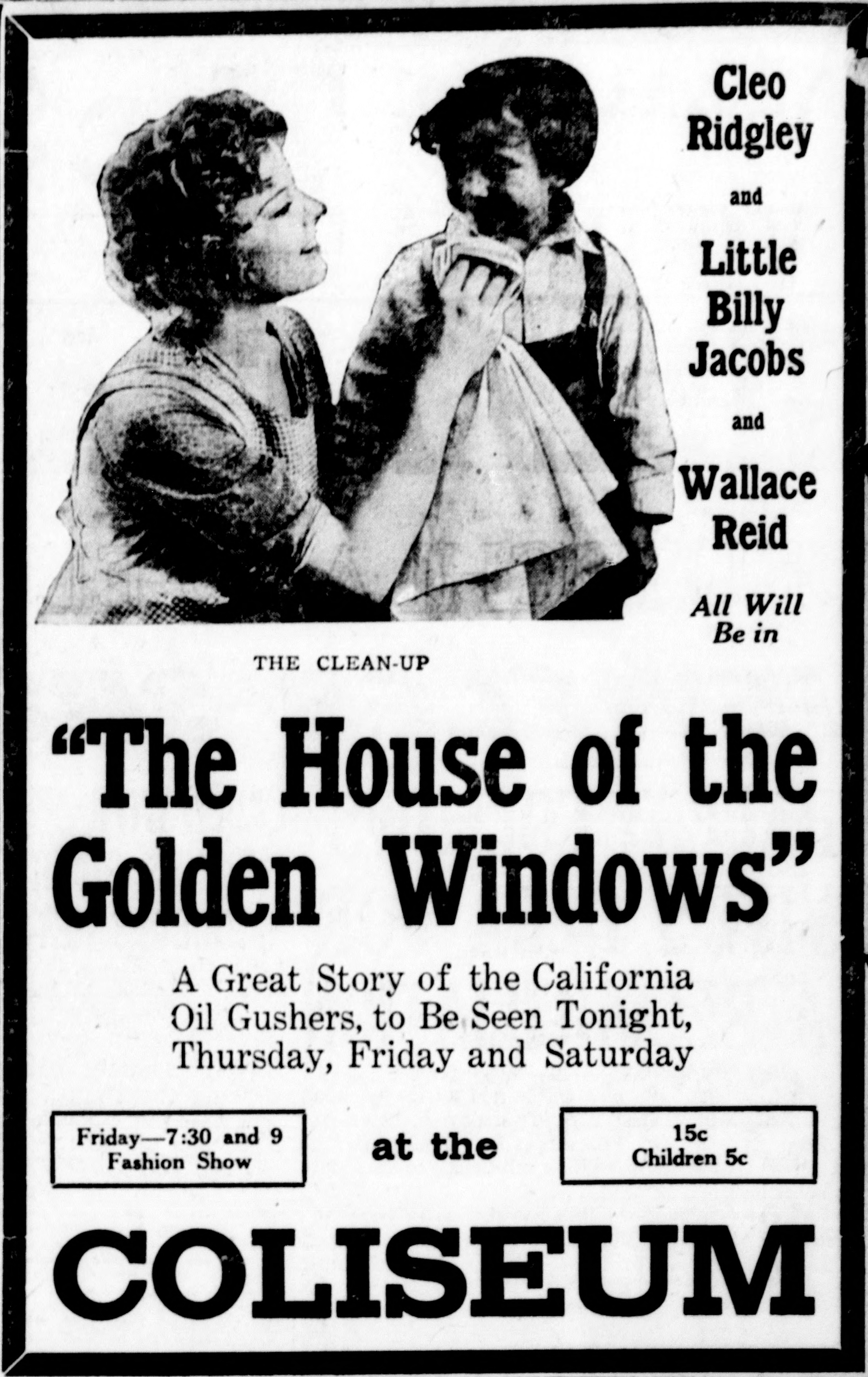
- Newspaper advertisement
- Directed by: George Melford
- Screenplay by: Charles Sarver
- Story by: L. V. Jefferson
- Produced by: Jesse L. Lasky
- Starring: Wallace Reid; Cleo Ridgely; Billy Jacobs; James Neill; Mabel Van Buren; Marjorie Daw
- Cinematography: Percy Hilburn
- Production company: Jesse L. Lasky Feature Play Company
- Distributed by: Paramount Pictures
- Release date: August 10, 1916
- Country: United States
- Language: Silent (English intertitles)

The House with the Golden Windows is a lost 1916 American drama silent film directed by George Melford and written by Charles Sarver. The film stars Wallace Reid, Cleo Ridgely, Billy Jacobs, James Neill, Mabel Van Buren, and Marjorie Daw. The film was released on August 10, 1916, by Paramount Pictures.

== Plot ==
The wife of a poor shepherd named Sue Wells is tired of being poor and takes advantage of a loophole to become owners of her neighbor's rich estate while her neighbor is gone. However, living in the mansion doesn't make Sue happy. When their neighbor comes home to find out what they have done he kills her husband. Right before he can kill her, she wakes up and realizes it was all a dream. Her husband then walks in and tells her that he got a job as that estate's overseer, so they won't have to worry about money anymore.

== Cast ==
- Wallace Reid as Tom Wells
- Cleo Ridgely as Sue Wells
- Billy Jacobs as Billy Wells
- James Neill as James Peabody
- Mabel Van Buren as Mrs. Peabody
- Marjorie Daw as A Fairy
- Bob Fleming as Peabody's Overseer
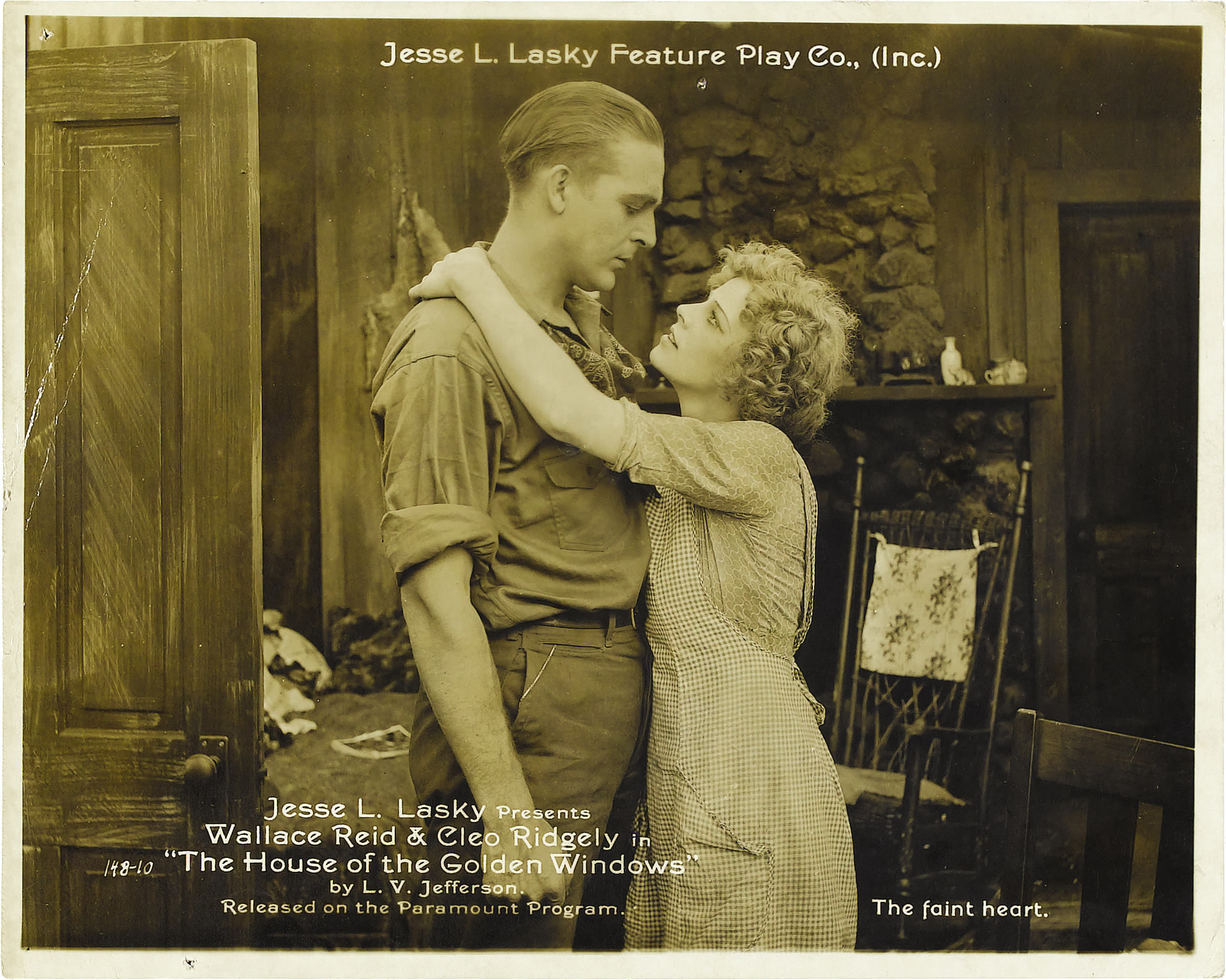
Wallace Reid and Cleo Ridgely

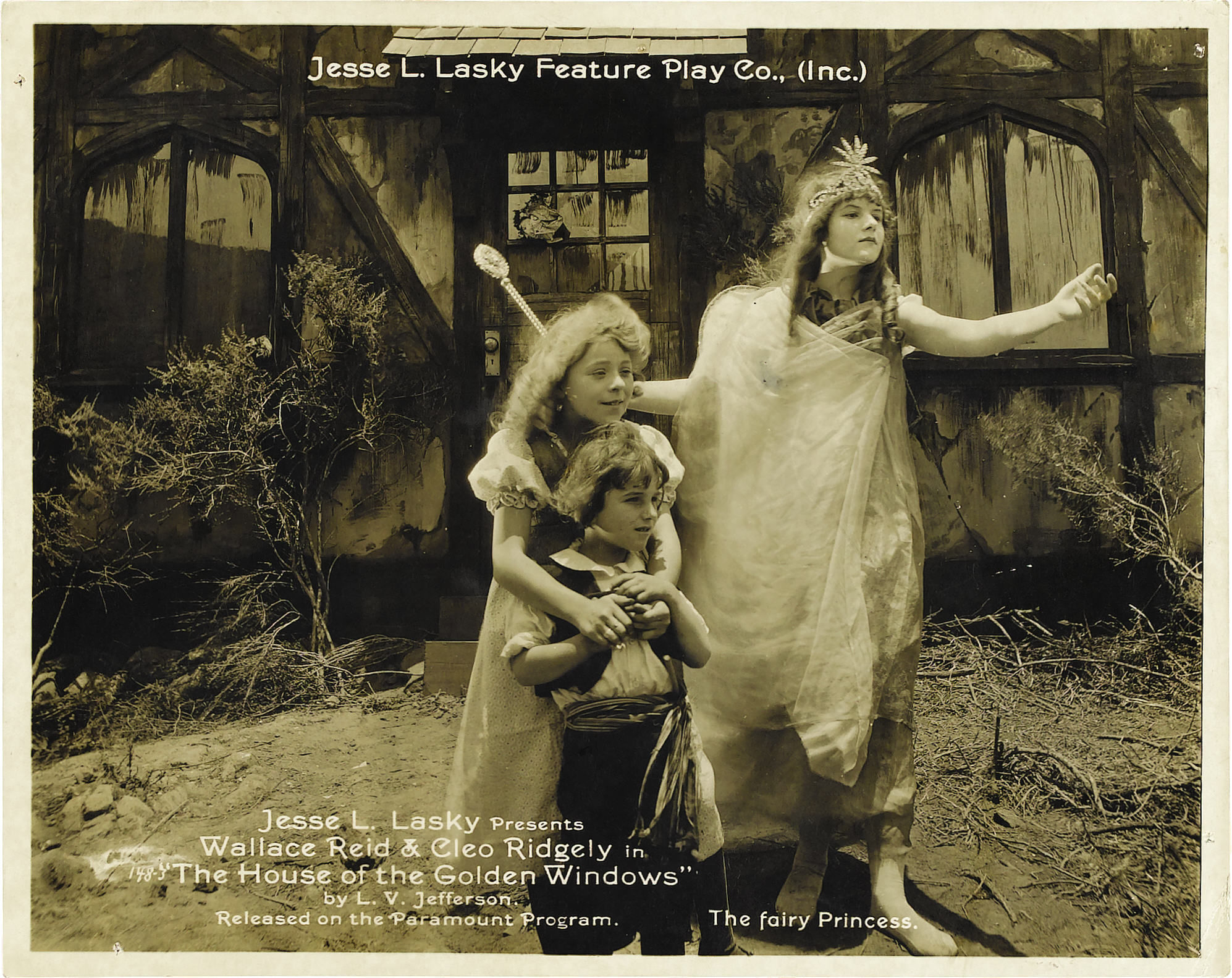
"The fairy princess"

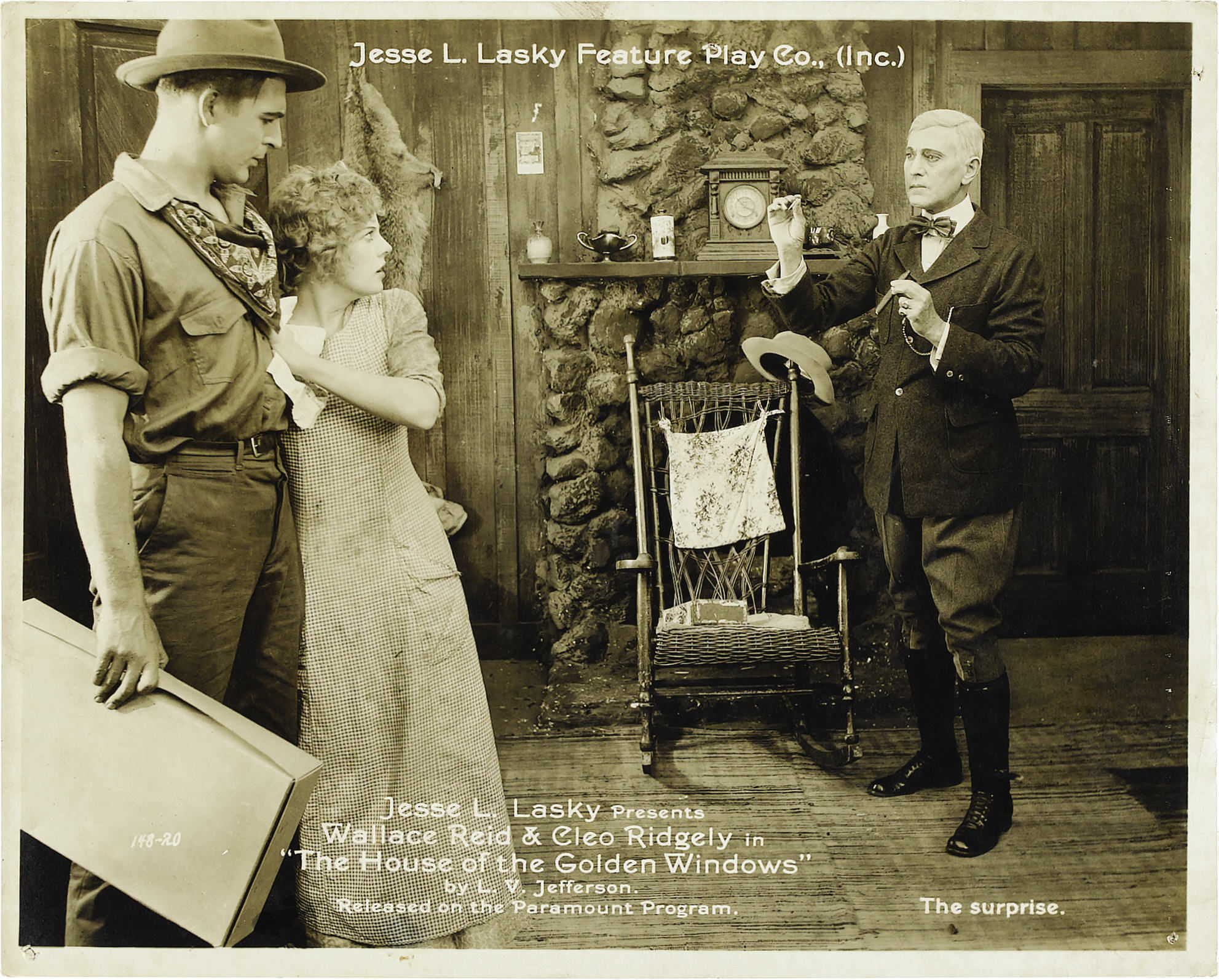
"The surprise"
