= Cleo Ridgely =

American actress

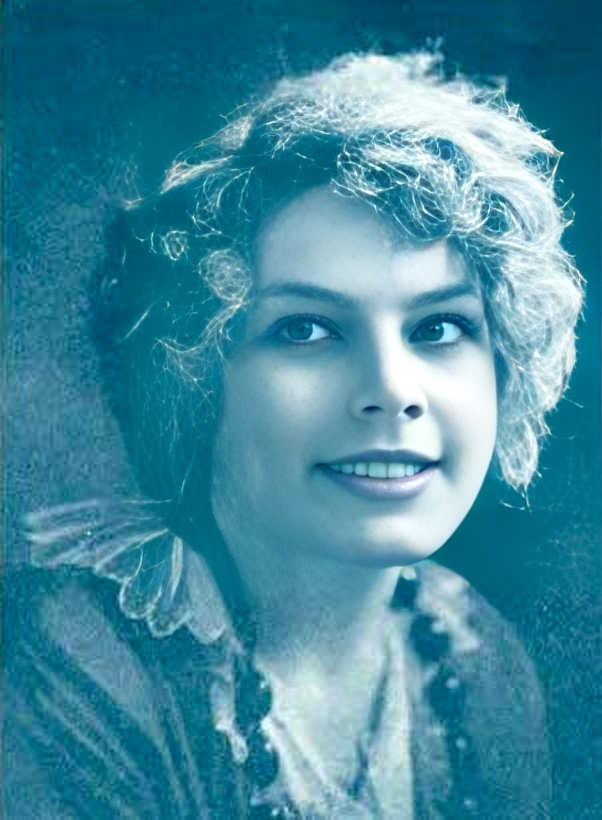
- Ridgely in 1916
- Born: Freda Cleo Helwig; May 12, 1893; New York City, U.S.
- Died: August 18, 1962 (aged 69); Glendale, California, U.S.
- Occupation: Actress
- Years active: 1911–1951
- Spouse(s): Jaudon M. Ridgely (div. 1916) James W. Horne (m. 1916; died 1942)
- Children: 2

Cleo Ridgely-Horne (born Freda Cleo Helwig, May 12, 1893 – August 18, 1962) was a star of silent and sound motion pictures. Her career began early in the silent film era, in 1911, and continued for forty years. She retired in the 1930s but later returned to make more movies. Her final film was Hollywood Story (1951), in which she had a bit part.

== Early life ==
Ridgely was born Freda Cleo Helwig in New York City. She was the daughter of August Helwig and Catherine Emily Sommerkamp. She had two sisters, Christina and Martha. After her parents' deaths when she was 2 years old, she lived in Wisconsin with her grandmother.

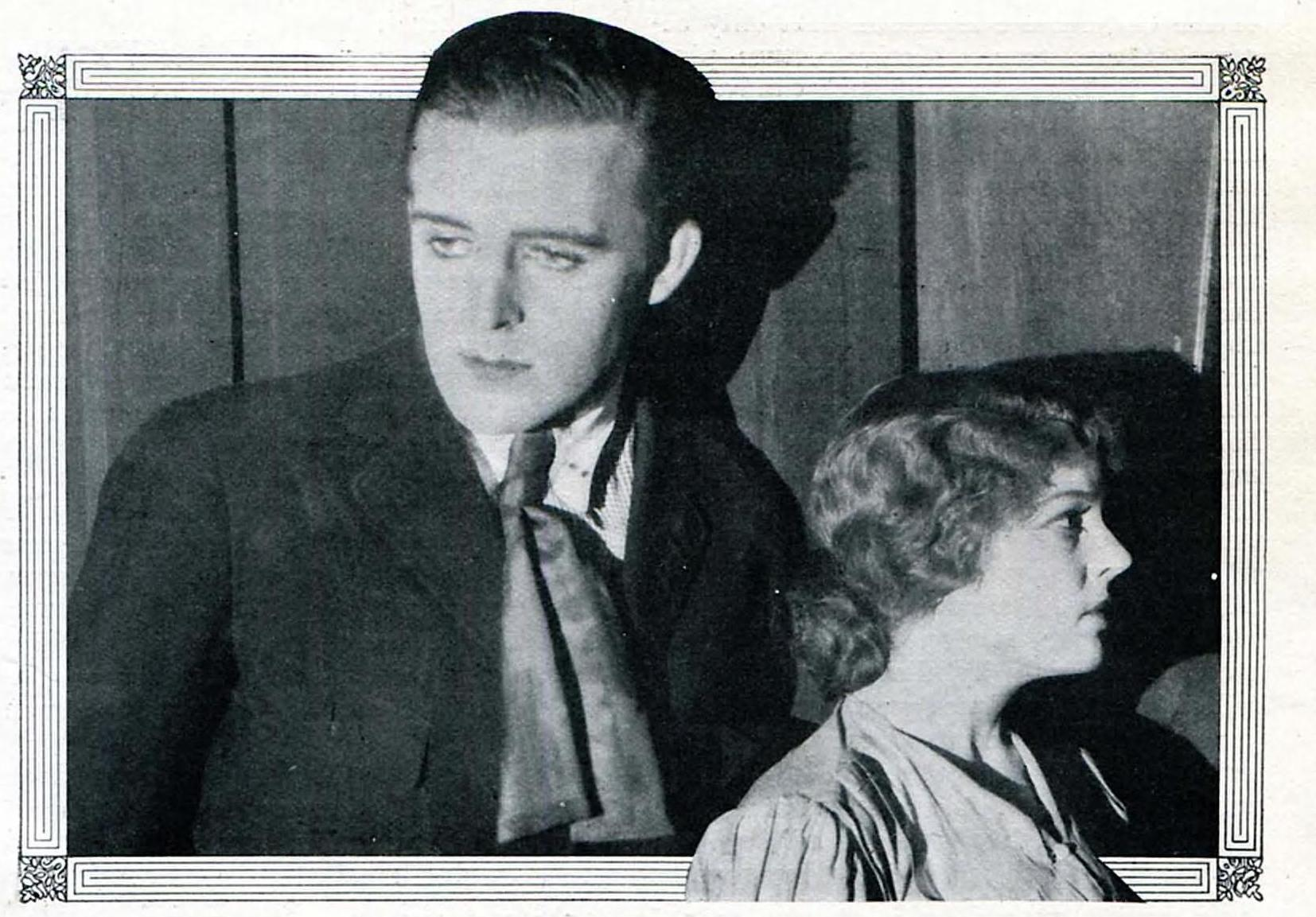
Wallace Reid and Cleo Ridgely in a publicity photo for the 1915 film The Golden Chance

== Career ==
Before she began working in films, Ridgely performed in the chorus at the Hippodrome Theater in New York City. In 1910, she began acting for the Kalem Company film studio in Jacksonville, Florida. After that, she worked for the Lubin and Rex studios.

Ridgely starred with Ruth Roland in a girl detective series in the 1920s and co-starred in a number of films with Wallace Reid and Lew Cody.

Ridgely worked with Famous Players–Lasky Film Company and also for Paramount Pictures. She was selected queen of the Auburn exhibit at the downtown automobile show in Los Angeles in October 1915. A publicity photo posed the actress with a 1916 Auburn Six. It was made by the Auburn Automobile Company and appeared at the show.

== Equestrian ==
Ridgely was an accomplished horsewoman. In 1912, accompanied by her first husband, she rode across the country on horseback from New York to Los Angeles. Making numerous promotional stops along the way, the trip lasted several months. In one of her Lasky features she stopped a runaway four-in-hand, risking her life, while on top of a stagecoach. Ridgely lived her later years in Glendale, California.

According to the magazine Kalem Kalendar (January 1915), during a trip over the Arizona borderline, Ridgely was captured by Mexican rebels. Fortunately, some American citizens heard of the incident and secured her release a few hours later.

In 2016, Ridgely was honored with a Letter of Commendation by the City of Glendale, California.

== Personal life ==
She was divorced from her first husband, Jaudon M. Ridgely, in Los Angeles in December 1916. She was then married to James W. Horne, who directed the Laurel and Hardy comedies for many years. She and Horne had twins, Jimmy Horne Jr. and June Jessamine Horne.

== Death ==
Ridgely died in 1962 at her home at the age of 69. She was buried in Forest Lawn Memorial Park.

== Partial filmography ==
- Leaves in the Storm (1912)
- The Spoilers (1914)
- Stolen Goods (1915)
- The Fighting Hope (1915)
- The Puppet Crown (1915)
- The Marriage of Kitty (1915)
- The Chorus Lady (1915)
- The Golden Chance (1915)
- The Love Mask (1916)
- The Selfish Woman (1916)
- The House with the Golden Windows (1916)
- The Victory of Conscience (1916)
- The Yellow Pawn (1916)
- The Victoria Cross (1916)
- Joan the Woman (1916)
- The Law and the Woman (1922)
- The Forgotten Law (1922)
- Dangerous Pastime (1922)
- The Sleepwalker (1922)
- The Beautiful and Damned (1922)
