= The Little American =

1917 film

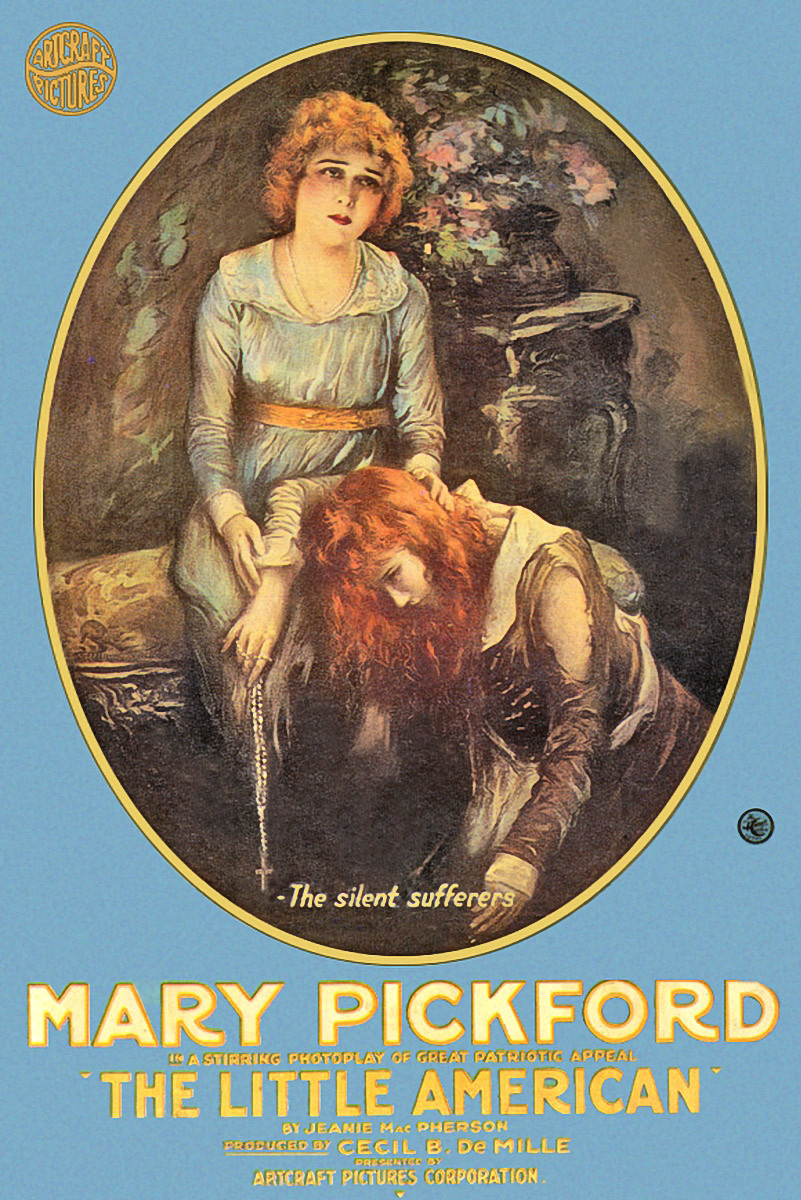
- Film poster
- Directed by: Cecil B. DeMille; Joseph Levering
- Written by: Jeanie MacPherson; Cecil B. DeMille (uncredited); Clarence J. Harris (uncredited)
- Produced by: Cecil B. DeMille
- Starring: Mary Pickford
- Cinematography: Alvin Wyckoff
- Edited by: Cecil B. DeMille
- Production company: Mary Pickford Film Corp.
- Distributed by: Artcraft Pictures Corporation
- Release date: July 12, 1917
- Running time: 80 minutes
- Country: United States
- Language: Silent (English intertitles)
- Budget: $166,949.16
- Box office: $446,236.88

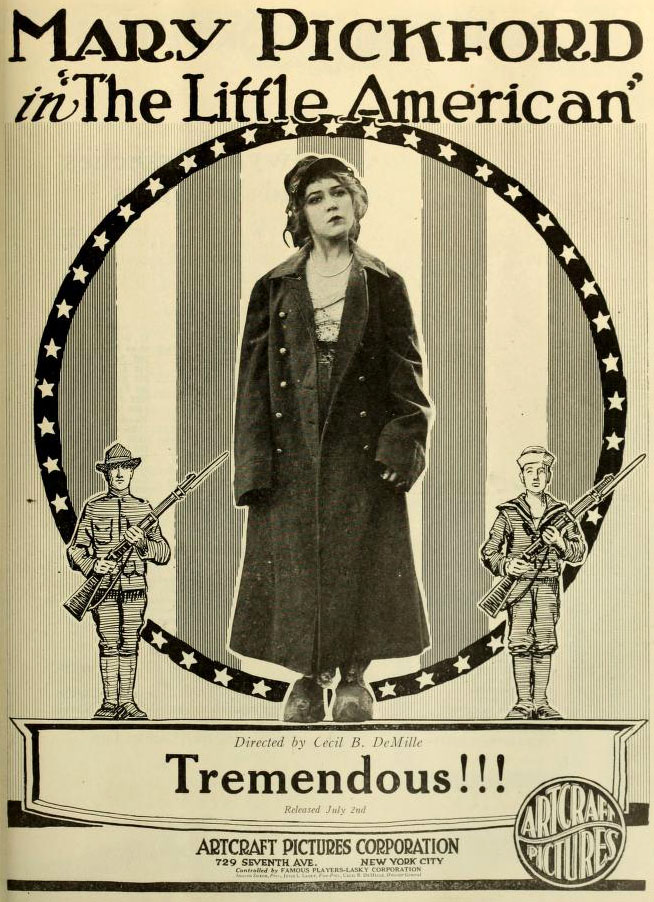
ad for the film

The Little American

The Little American is a 1917 American silent romantic war drama film directed by Cecil B. DeMille. The film stars Mary Pickford (who also served as producer) as an American woman who is in love with both a German soldier and a French soldier during World War I. Art direction for the film was done by Wilfred Buckland. John Hay Beith was technical advisor on the film, credited under his pen name, Ian Hay.

== Plot ==
Karl Von Austreim lives in America with his German father and American mother. He admires and woos a young woman, Angela Moore. As she is celebrating her birthday on the Fourth of July of 1914, she receives flowers from the French Count Jules De Destin. They are interrupted by Karl, who also gives her a present, and they compete for Angela's favor. Karl is unexpectedly summoned to Hamburg to join his regiment, and Angela is crushed when he announces he has to leave. The next day, Angela reads in the paper the Germans and French are at war and 10,000 Germans have been killed already.

Three months pass by without a word from Karl. Angela is requested by her aunt in France to visit and take her to the USA. Word spreads that Germany will sink any ship which is thought to be carrying munitions to the Allies. Angela is aboard one of those ships when it is torpedoed, and saves herself by climbing onto a floating table, begging the attackers not to fire on the passengers. She is eventually rescued.

After weeks of ceaseless hammering from the German guns, the French fall back on Vangy, the home of Angela's aunt. At the same time, Angela arrives at Chateau Vangy to visit her aunt, only to discover she has died. The Prussians are bombing the city and Angela is requested to flee. However, she is determined to stay to nurse the French wounded soldiers. A French soldier tries to help Angela escape, but she is unwilling to. He next asks her to let a French soldier spy on the Germans and inform the French via a secret hidden telephone. Angela is afraid, but gives them permission. The Germans attack the chateau and the remaining French soldier is killed.

German soldiers enter the chateau with the intention of getting drunk and enjoying themselves with the women who work there. After discovering the other young women, the Germans are intent on also raping Angela, who is the only person in the mansion not to be hidden. To save herself, she reveals herself to be a neutral American, but they are not interested in her nationality. Angela attempts to run away and hide, but is discovered by a German soldier who turns out to be Karl. Angela begs him to save the other women in the house, but Karl responds he cannot give orders to his superior officer, who says his men deserve their 'relaxation'. She realizes there is nothing she can do. With permission to leave the mansion, she witnesses the execution of French civilians. She is heartbroken and decides to go back for revenge.

Angela secretly calls the French with the hidden telephone and describes three gun positions near the chateau. The French prepare themselves and attack the Germans. The Germans realize someone is giving the French information and Karl catches Angela. He tries to help her escape, but they are caught. The commander orders that Angela be shot as a spy. When Karl tries to save her, he is sentenced to be executed for treason. As the couple face death, the French shell the chateau, enabling Angela and Karl to escape. They are too weak to run and collapse near a statue of Jesus in the ruins of a church. The next day, they are found by French soldiers. They initially want to shoot Karl, but Angela begs their commander, Count De Destin, to set him free. They eventually allow her to return to America with Karl by her side.

== Cast ==
- Mary Pickford as Angela More
- Jack Holt as Karl Von Austreim
- Raymond Hatton as Count Jules De Destin
- Hobart Bosworth as German Colonel
- Walter Long as German Captain
- James Neill as Senator John More
- Ben Alexander as Bobby More
- Guy Oliver as Frederick Von Austreim
- Edythe Chapman as Mrs. Von Austreim
- Lillian Leighton as Angela's Great Aunt
- DeWitt Jennings as English Barrister
- Wallace Beery as German soldier (uncredited)
- Gordon Griffith as Child (uncredited)
- Ramon Novarro as Wounded Soldier (uncredited)
- Colleen Moore as Nurse (uncredited)
- Norman Kerry as Wounded Soldier (uncredited)
- Sam Wood as Wounded Soldier (uncredited)

== Reception ==
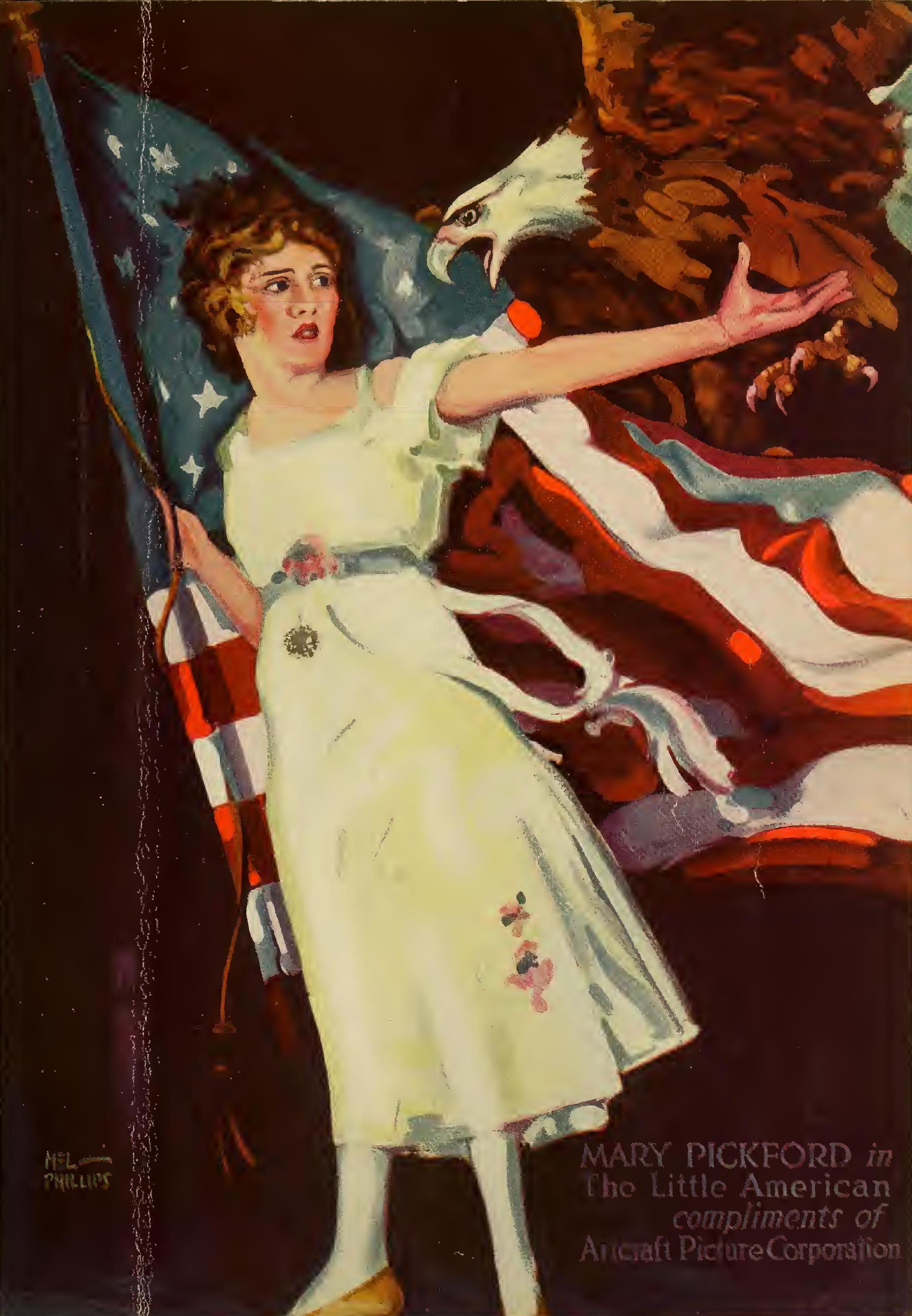
Artcraft Picture Corporation ad in Motion Picture News, 1917

Although the United States had entered World War I and declared war on Germany earlier in 1917, the Chicago Board of Censors initially blocked exhibition of the film in that city, calling it anti-German and suggesting that showing it could start a riot. Artcraft challenged the Board in state court and, after a jury trial, the refusal of the board to issue a permit despite a court order, and the denial of a second appeal by the board, won the right to show the film in Chicago.

== Preservation ==
Complete prints of The Little American are held by:

- Cineteca Del Friuli in Gemona on 16 mm film
- George Eastman Museum on 35 mm film
- Library of Congress on 35 and 16 mm film
- UCLA Film and Television Archive
- Pickford Center for Motion Picture Study on 35 mm film

== See also ==
- Mary Pickford filmography
- The House That Shadows Built (1931 promotional film by Paramount)
