= The Golden Chance =

1915 film

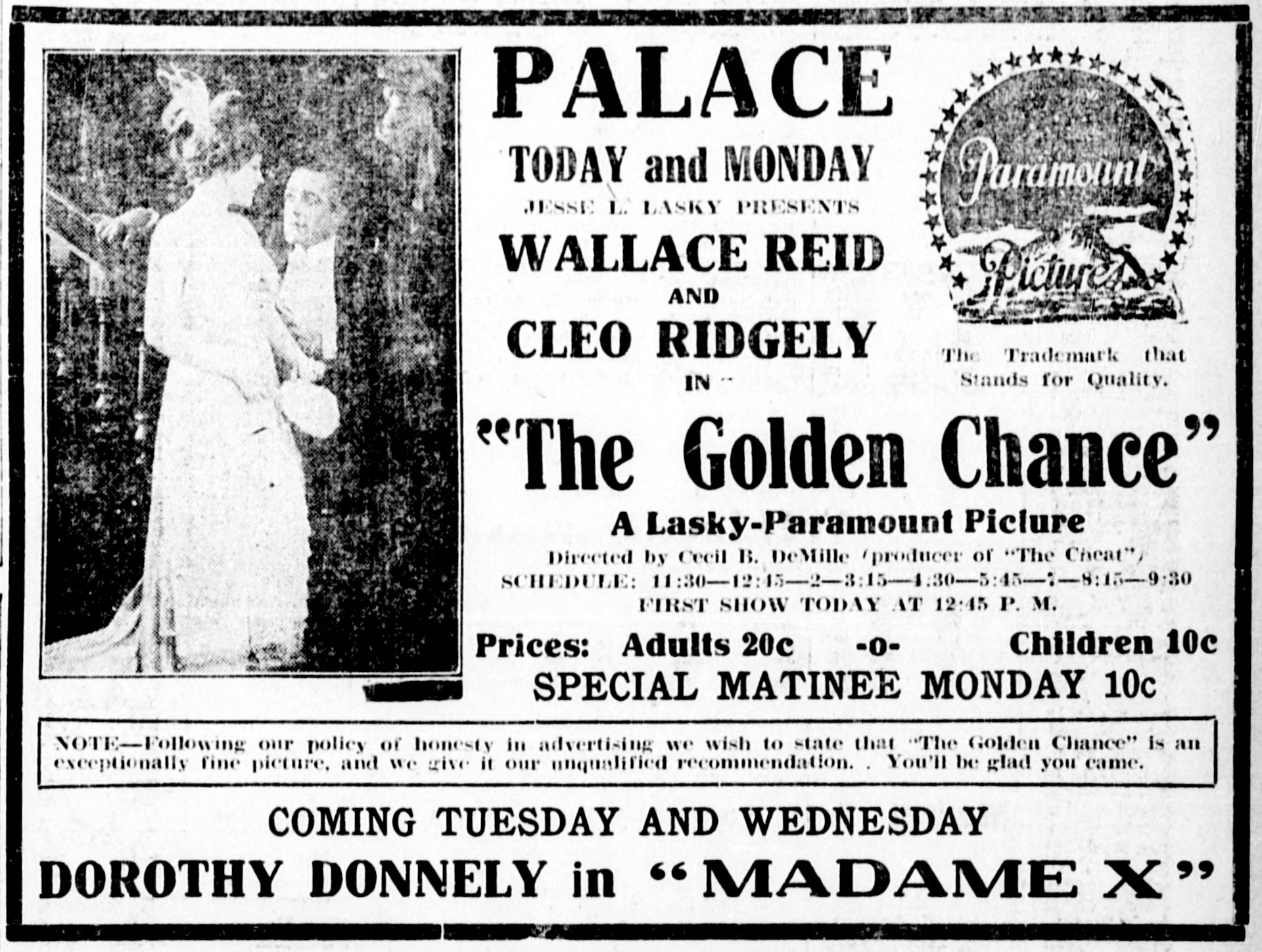
- Newspaper advertisement
- Directed by: Cecil B. DeMille
- Written by: Cecil B. DeMille; Jeanie Macpherson
- Produced by: Cecil B. DeMille
- Starring: Cleo Ridgely
- Cinematography: Alvin Wyckoff
- Edited by: Cecil B. DeMille
- Production company: Jesse L. Lasky Feature Play Co.
- Distributed by: Paramount Pictures
- Release date: December 30, 1915
- Running time: 74 minutes
- Country: United States
- Language: Silent (English intertitles)
- Budget: $18,711
- Box office: $83,504

The Golden Chance (1915)

The Golden Chance is a 1915 American silent drama film directed by Cecil B. DeMille. Art direction for the film was done by Wilfred Buckland. DeMille remade the film in 1921 as Forbidden Fruit.

== Cast ==
- Cleo Ridgely as Mary Denby
- Wallace Reid as Roger Manning
- Horace B. Carpenter as Steve Denby
- Ernest Joy as Mr. Hillary
- Edythe Chapman as Mrs. Hillary
- Raymond Hatton as Jimmy The Rat
- Lucien Littlefield as Roger Manning's Valet - Introductory Sequence (uncredited)

== Preservation and availability ==
A complete 16 mm print of The Golden Chance is held by the George Eastman Museum in Rochester, New York.

In 2005, the film was released on DVD with Don't Change Your Husband by Image Entertainment.
