= The Victory of Conscience =

1916 film by Frank Reicher

- Directed by: Frank Reicher and George Melford
- Written by: Alexandro de Jannelli (story); Margaret Turnbull (scenario)
- Produced by: Jesse L. Lasky
- Cinematography: Dent Gilbert
- Production company: Famous Players–Lasky
- Distributed by: Paramount Pictures
- Release date: August 27, 1916
- Running time: 50 minutes; 5 reels
- Country: United States
- Languages: Silent; English intertitles

The Victory of Conscience is a 1916 American silent drama film produced by Jesse L. Lasky at Famous Players–Lasky and distributed by Paramount Pictures. Frank Reicher directed and Lou Tellegen and Cleo Ridgely star.

== Cast ==
- Cleo Ridgely - Rosette Burgod
- Lou Tellegen - Louis, Count De Tavannes
- Elliott Dexter - Prince Dimitri Karitzin
- Thomas Delmar - Remy
- Laura Woods Cushing - Mother Burgod
- John McKinnon - Father Burgod

== Preservation status ==
The film is preserved at the Library of Congress.
