= Margaret Turnbull (screenwriter) =

Scottish screenwriter

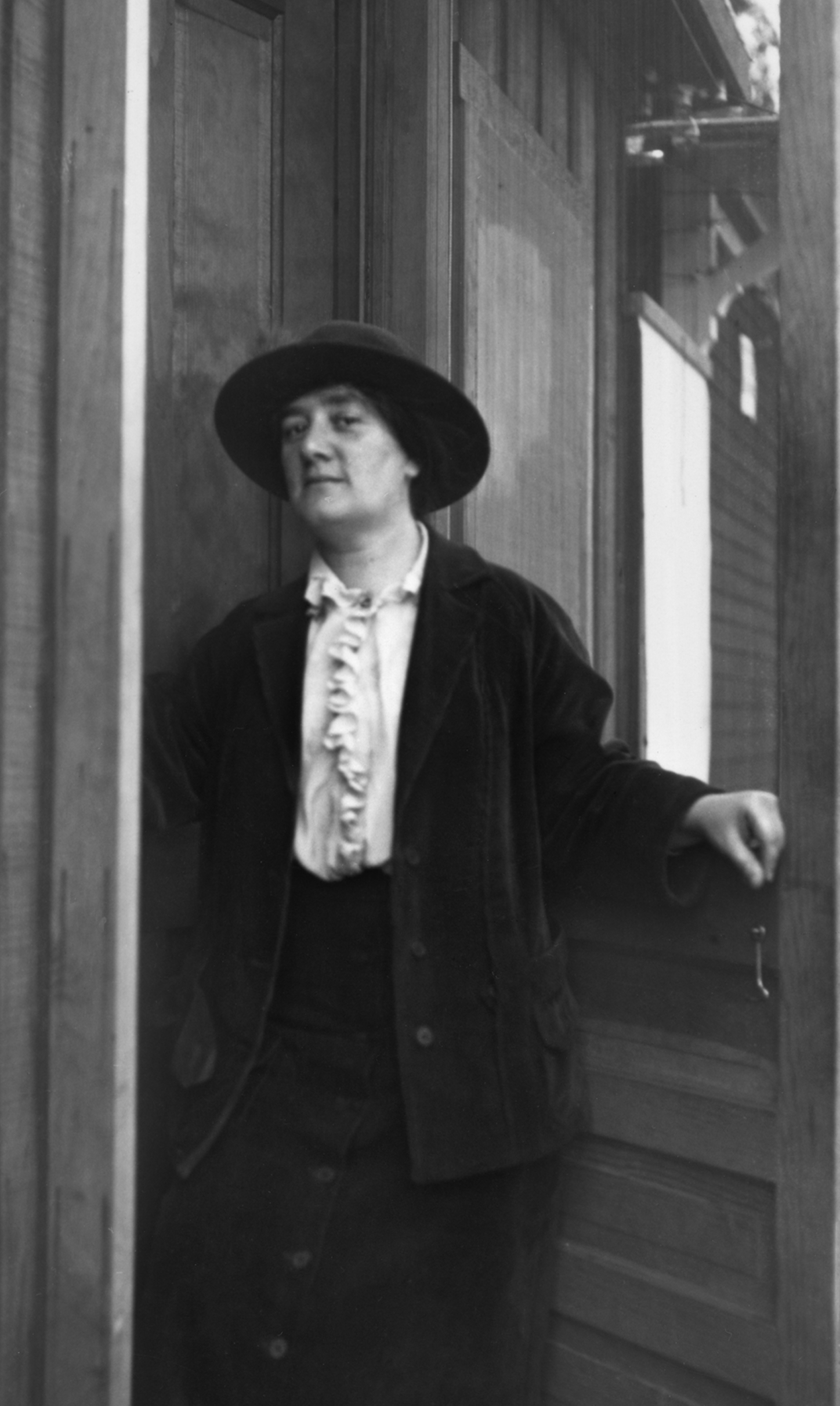
- Margaret Turnbull in 1915
- Born: 17 November 1872; Glasgow, Scotland
- Died: 12 June 1942 (aged 69); Yarmouthport, Massachusetts, USA
- Occupation: Writer
- Years active: 1914-1939

Margaret Turnbull (17 November 1872 – 12 June 1942) was a Scottish novelist, playwright and screenwriter in silent films.

== Early life ==
Turnbull was born in Glasgow, Scotland. She was the older sister of producer Hector Turnbull and sister to Jean, Mary, Alice, Donald, and Isabel. Her family moved to the United States during her childhood, and she attended school in New Jersey.

== Career ==
Turnbull wrote plays, including Genessee of the Hills (1905), A Society Policeman (1905), Classmates (1907, with William C. deMille), On the Square (1913, with her brother), The Deadlock (1913), and At the Mitre (1914). In 1912, a script she submitted anonymously was produced in New York by Henry Wilson Savage, as The Stronger Claim.

Turnbull wrote for 51 films between 1914 and 1939. She worked for Paramount Pictures and the Famous Players–Lasky studios in Islington, and also spent some of her career in Hollywood. In 1915, she wrote at least three films that starred Blanche Sweet; she also wrote films starring Edna Goodrich and Enrico Caruso. She was described as a "popular writer" and William C. deMille's assistant in a 1915 article about film dramas.

Turnbull also wrote novels, including W. A. G.'s Tale (1913), Looking After Sandy (1915), The Close Up (1918), Alabaster Lamps (1925) Madame Judas (1926), The Left Lady (1926),The Handsome Man (1930), and The Bride's Mirror (1934). "I am sure," she told an interviewer in 1926, "that I get much more pleasure in writing a book or play than Mr. Ford has ever gotten from all the machines he has put on the market."

== Personal life ==
Turnbull lived in Bucks County, Pennsylvania. She died in Yarmouth Port, Massachusetts in 1942, aged 69 years.

== Selected filmography ==
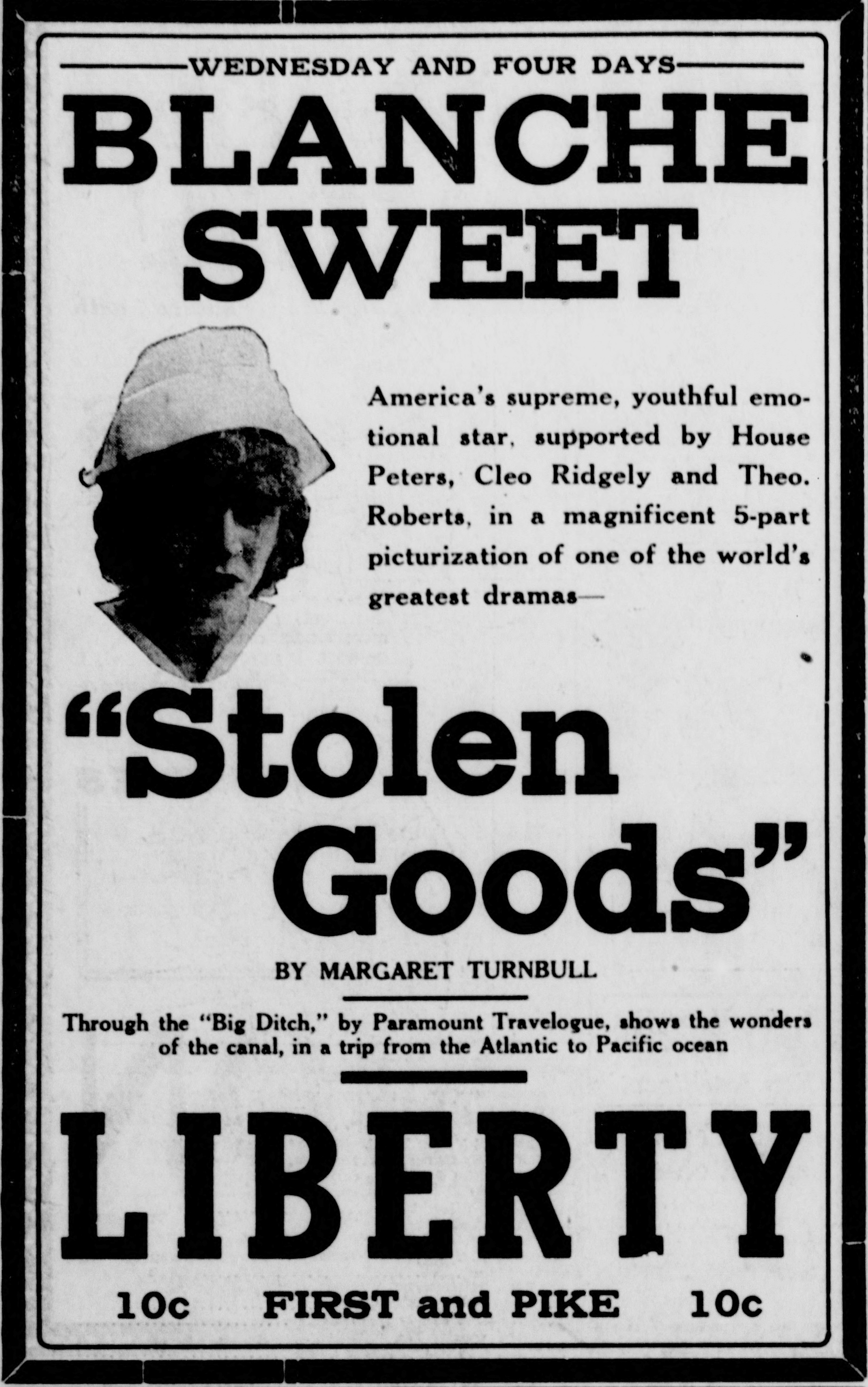
Newspaper advertisement for Stolen Goods (1915), starring Blanche Sweet, with Margaret Trumbull credited as writer.

- The Fighting Hope (1915)
- Armstrong's Wife (1915)
- Blackbirds (1915)
- The Secret Sin (1915)
- The Unknown (1915)
- Stolen Goods (1915)
- The Clue (1915)
- To Have and to Hold (1916)
- Alien Souls (1916)
- Public Opinion (1916)
- The Victory of Conscience (1916)
- Shirley Kaye (1917)
- Magda (1917)
- Lost and Won (1917)
- The Shuttle (1918)
- My Cousin (1918)
- The Two Brides (1919)
- The Tree of Knowledge (1920)
- The Bonnie Brier Bush (1921)
- The Princess of New York (1921)
- The Mystery Road (1921)
- Appearances (1921)
- Three Live Ghosts (1922)
- La Bataille (1923)
- Rogue's March (1928)
