= Edythe Chapman =

American actress (1863–1948)

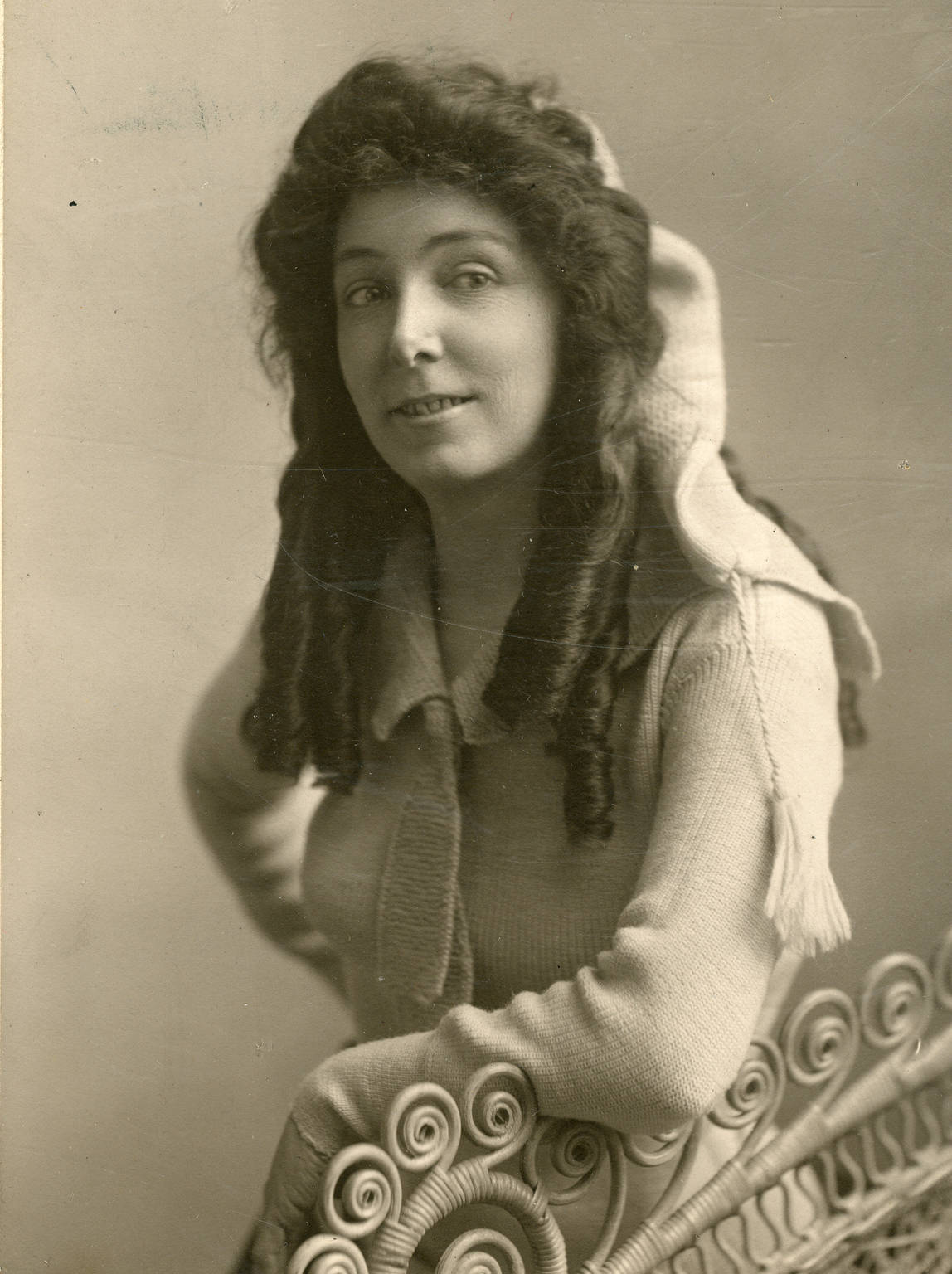
- Chapman c. 1904
- Born: October 8, 1863; Rochester, New York U.S.
- Died: October 15, 1948 (aged 85); Glendale, California U.S.
- Resting place: Bonaventure Cemetery
- Occupation: Actress
- Years active: 1898–1930
- Spouse: James Neill (m.1897–1931; his death)

Edythe Chapman (October 8, 1863 – October 15, 1948) was an American stage and silent film actress.

== Career ==
Born in Rochester, New York, Chapman began her stage career as early as 1898 when she appeared in New York City in The Charity Ball.

Chapman played maternal roles in numerous silent motion pictures and became known in the 1920s as Hollywood's Mother. She played Ma Jones in the film version of Lightnin' (1925), a screen production that featured Will Rogers. Edythe was Grandmother Janeway in Man Crazy (1927). The film starred Dorothy Mackaill and Jack Mulhall.

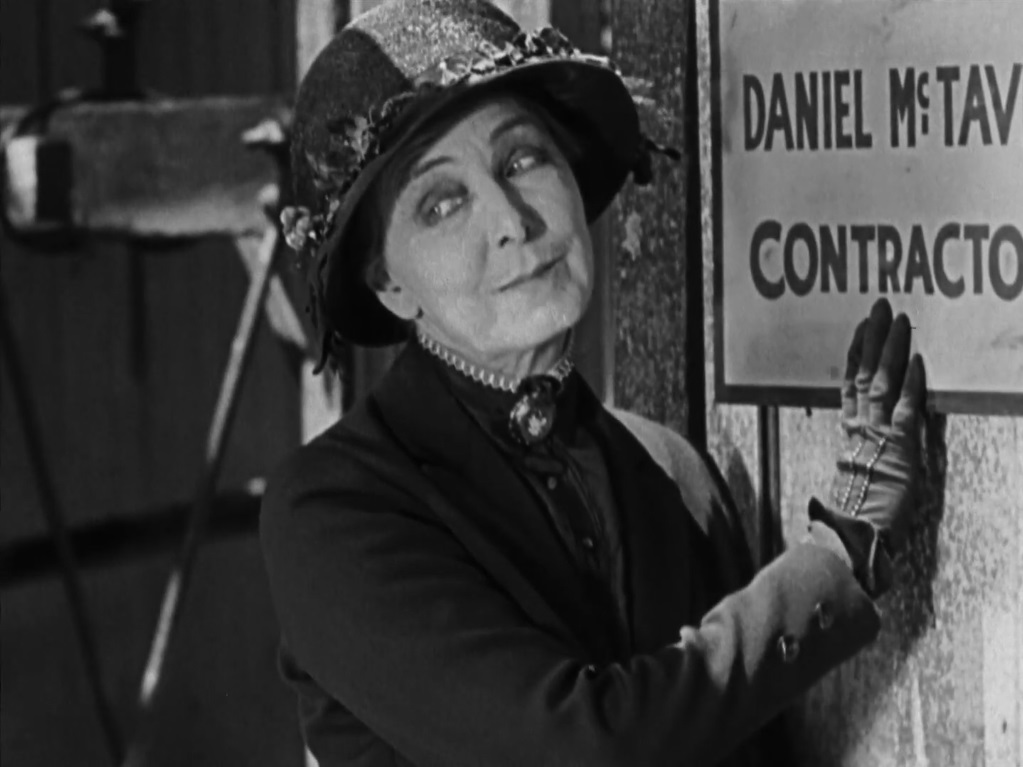
Chapman in The Ten Commandments (1923)

Chapman came to Hollywood around 1909 with her husband, screen and stage actor James Neill. The two met in Cincinnati when Chapman was working in Neill's stock company. The couple got married in 1897 and soon began making movies with Cecil B. DeMille and other noteworthy directors and producers. They had leading roles in The Ten Commandments (1923), Manslaughter (1922), The Little American (1917), and other silent motion pictures. Neill died in 1931. The final movie in which Edythe appeared was Double Crossroads in 1930. Prior to this, she had a large role in Navy Blues (1929).

== Death ==
Chapman Neill died in Glendale, California after a brief illness, a week past her 85th birthday. She was interred alongside her husband at Bonaventure Cemetery.

== Partial filmography ==
- Richelieu (1914) (a lost film)
- The Pretty Sister of Jose (1915) (lost)
- The Golden Chance (1915) (directed by Demille)
- The Heir to the Hoorah (1916)
- Oliver Twist (1916) (lost)
- A Mormon Maid (1917)
- The Little American (1917)
- The Crystal Gazer (1917)
- Tom Sawyer (1917)
- A Modern Musketeer (1917)
- Huck and Tom (1918)
- The Whispering Chorus (1918) (produced and directed by Demille)
- Old Wives for New (1918) (uncredited)
- Rose o' Paradise (1918)
- The Only Road (1918)
- Say! Young Fellow (1918) (lost)
- Bound in Morocco (1918) (lost)
- The Gypsy Trail (1918)
- Unexpected Places (1918)
- Faith (1919)
- The Winning Girl (1919)
- The Twin Pawns (1919) *uncredited role
- The Knickerbocker Buckaroo (1919) (lost)
- An Innocent Adventuress (1919)
- Secret Service (1919)
- Flame of the Desert (1919)
- Everywoman (1919)
- The Little Shepherd of Kingdom Come (1920)
- Huckleberry Finn (1920)
- A Double-Dyed Deceiver (1920)
- Pinto (1920)
- The County Fair (1920)
- Bunty Pulls the Strings (1921)
- A Tale of Two Worlds (1921)
- One Wild Week (1921) (lost)
- Bits of Life (1921) (lost)
- A Wife's Awakening (1921)
- Dangerous Curve Ahead (1921) (lost)
- Alias Ladyfingers (1921)
- Voices of the City (1921) (lost)
- Saturday Night (1922) (lost)
- Her Husband's Trademark (1922)
- Beyond the Rocks (1922)
- North of the Rio Grande (1922)
- Manslaughter (1922) (directed by Demille)
- My American Wife (1922) (lost)
- Youth to Youth (1922)
- Hollywood (1923) (cameo in lost film)
- The Ten Commandments (1923)
- Chastity (1923)
- Divorce (1923)
- The Miracle Makers (1923)
- The Shadow of the Desert (1924) (lost)
- Daughters of Pleasure (1924)
- Broken Barriers (1924)
- In the Name of Love (1925)
- Learning to Love (1925)
- The Pride of the Force (1925)
- Lightnin' (1925)
- Classified (1925)
- Havoc (1925)
- Lazybones (1925)
- Soul Mates (1925)
- Three Faces East (1926)
- The Runaway (1926)
- The Boob (1926)
- The King of Kings (1927) (uncredited in Demille-directed film)
- Naughty but Nice (1927)
- The Student Prince in Old Heidelberg (1927) (uncredited)
- American Beauty (1927)
- Man Crazy (1927)
- Happiness Ahead (1928)
- Heart Trouble (1928)
- Three Weekends (1928)
- The Count of Ten (1928)
- The Shepherd of the Hills (1928)
- Synthetic Sin (1929)
- Twin Beds (1929)
- The Idle Rich (1929)
- Navy Blues (1929)
- Take the Heir (1930)
