= Leighton Osmun =

American screenwriter

- Born: Leighton Graves Osmun; December 13, 1880; Newark, New Jersey, U.S.
- Died: June 12, 1928 (aged 47); La Jolla, California, U.S.
- Occupation: Screenwriter
- Years active: 1916–1923
- Spouses: Harriet Scholl (divorced): Lula Drummond

Leighton Graves Osmun (December 13, 1880 – June 12, 1928) was an American screenwriter, playwright, and author who was active during Hollywood's silent era. He often collaborated with fellow screenwriter Beatrice deMille.

== Biography ==
Leighton was born in Newark, New Jersey, to banker J. Allen Osmun and Mary Graves.

In 1916, while living in Los Angeles and working as a writer, Leighton briefly disappeared after divorcing his first wife, Harriet Scholl, and marrying his second wife, Lula Dix Drummond. He and Lula had a daughter, Sarah, together; she would go on to marry William Ince, son of director Thomas H. Ince.

In the summer of 1929, he suffered a heart attack and died after rescuing a child who was in danger of drowning at a beach in La Jolla, California. He was 48 years old. He was survived by his second wife, Dix, and his daughter, Sarah.

== Selected filmography ==
- East Side - West Side (1923)
- The Woman Game (1920)
- The Fortune Teller (1920)
- The Clutch of Circumstance (1918)
- Treasure of the Sea (1918)
- The Claim (1918)
- The Devil-Stone (1917)
- Forbidden Paths (1917)
- The Inner Shrine (1917)
- The Jaguar's Claws (1917)
- Unconquered (1917)
- Sacrifice (1917)
- Castles for Two (1917)
- Betty to the Rescue (1917)
- The Years of the Locust (1916)
- The Heir to the Hoorah (1916)
- The Storm (1916)
- Each Pearl a Tear (1916)
