= Sacrifice (1917 film) =

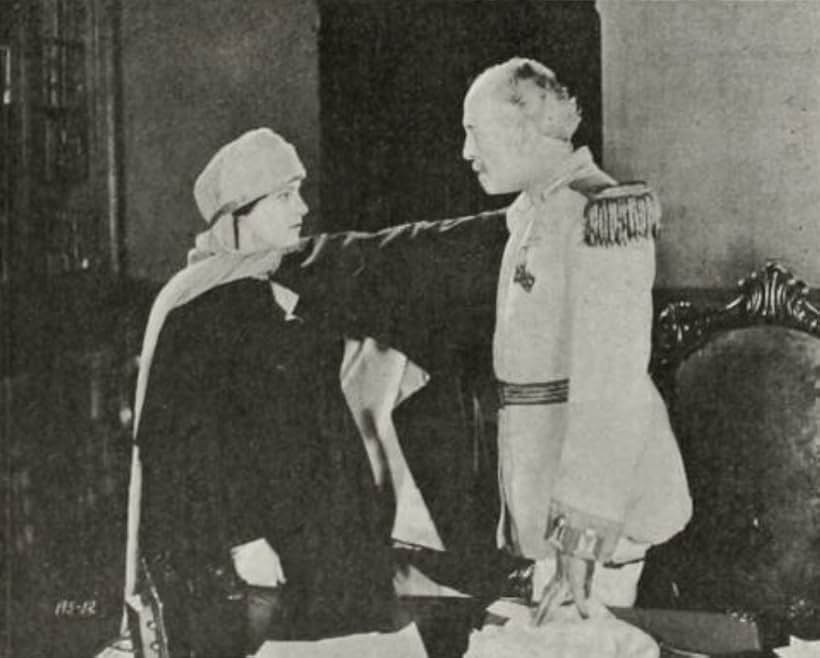
- Directed by: Frank Reicher
- Screenplay by: Charles Kenyon; Beatrice deMille; Leighton Osmun
- Produced by: Jesse L. Lasky
- Starring: Margaret Illington; Jack Holt; Noah Beery, Sr. Winter Hall
- Cinematography: Dent Gilbert
- Production company: Jesse L. Lasky Feature Play Company
- Distributed by: Paramount Pictures
- Release date: May 3, 1917
- Running time: 50 minutes
- Country: United States
- Languages: Silent; English titles

Sacrifice is a 1917 American drama silent film directed by Frank Reicher and written by Charles Kenyon, Beatrice DeMille and Leighton Osmun. The film stars Margaret Illington, Jack Holt, Noah Beery, Sr. and Winter Hall. The film was released on May 3, 1917, by Paramount Pictures.

== Cast ==
- Margaret Illington as Mary Stephen / Vesta Boris
- Jack Holt as Paul Ekald
- Winter Hall as Stephen Stephani
- Noah Beery, Sr. as Count Wenzel

== Censorship ==
Before Sacrifice could be exhibited in Kansas, the Kansas Board of Review required the removal of several scenes of women smoking and men drinking, and of several men arguing over Vesta.

== Preservation status ==
Only reel 5 of a five reel film survives in the Library of Congress.
