= Witchcraft (1916 film) =

1916 film by Frank Reicher

- Directed by: Frank Reicher
- Screenplay by: Margaret Turnbull
- Story by: Robert Ralston Reed
- Produced by: Jesse L. Lasky
- Starring: Fannie Ward; Jack Dean; Paul Weigel; Lillian Leighton
- Cinematography: Dent Gilbert
- Production company: Jesse L. Lasky Feature Play Company
- Distributed by: Paramount Pictures
- Release date: October 16, 1916
- Running time: 50 minutes
- Country: United States
- Language: English

Witchcraft is a lost 1916 American drama silent film directed by Frank Reicher and written by Margaret Turnbull. The film stars Fannie Ward, Jack Dean, Paul Weigel and Lillian Leighton. The film was released on October 16, 1916, by Paramount Pictures.

== Plot ==
Suzette and her mother are two Huguenots living in a New England colony whose elders persecute any so-called deviant behavior, labeling it as witchcraft. When Suzette's mother falls ill, Suzette seeks the help of Nokomis, an Indian woman who has been accused of witchcraft. Suzette meets and falls in love with Richard Wayne. But Makepeace Struble, Wayne's protégé, wants Suzette for him and sends Wayne to work for the governor, so as to give him free rein with the young woman. Accusing his mother of witchcraft, Struble blackmails the girl into marrying him. The man becomes more and more violent and when his mother dies, Nokomis gives Suzette a talisman, telling her that an Indian revolt is brewing. She warns Wayne and Struble, struck by a stroke of apoplexy, accuses her of having cast a spell on him. Although Suzette saved the city from Indian attack, she is still sentenced to hang. She will only be able to save herself through the last-minute intervention of Wayne and the governor and, eventually, she will be able to marry the man she loves.

== Cast ==
- Fannie Ward as Suzette
- Jack Dean as Richard Wayne
- Paul Weigel as Makepeace Struble
- Lillian Leighton as Nokomis

== See also ==
- List of films about witchcraft
