= Paul Weigel =

American actor (1867–1951)

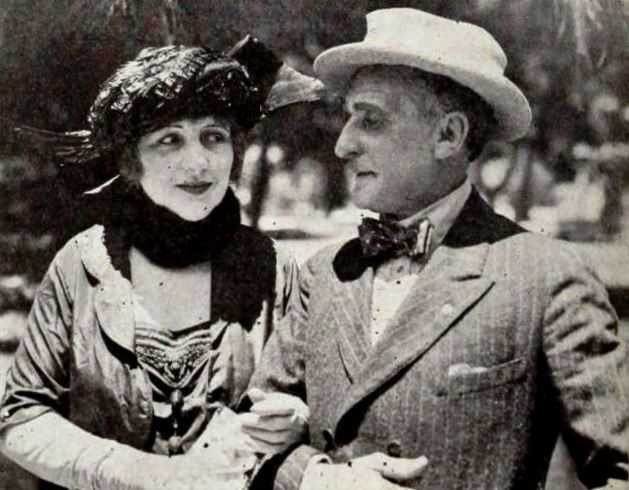
- Lila Leslie with Weigel, 1921
- Born: 18 February 1867; Halle, Province of Saxony, Kingdom of Prussia
- Died: 25 May 1951 (aged 84); Los Angeles, California, United States
- Occupation: Actor
- Years active: 1916–1945
- Spouse(s): Estelle Blau (m. 1918; div. ?); Florence Stevens Smith (m. 1925; )

Paul Weigel (18 February 1867 – 25 May 1951) was a German-American actor. He appeared in more than 110 films between 1916 and 1945.

Weigel debuted with a stock theater company in Germany, and he went on to act in New York. He began acting in films in 1915.

== Selected filmography ==
- Naked Hearts (1916) - Cecil's Father
- Each Pearl a Tear (1916) - Roger Winston
- The Intrigue (1916) - Attaché to the Baron
- Witchcraft (1916) - Makepeace Struble
- Each to His Kind (1917) - Asa Judd
- The Black Wolf (1917) - Old Luis
- The Winning of Sally Temple (1917) - Talbot
- The Bond Between (1917) - Carl Riminoss
- The Inner Shrine (1917) - Minor Role
- Forbidden Paths (1917) - Luis Valdez
- Pride and the Man (1917) - George Everett
- The Claim (1918) - Mike Bryan
- The Only Road (1918) - Manuel Lopez
- Her Body in Bond (1918) - Emmett Gibson
- Me und Gott (1918) - The Kaiser
- The Parisian Tigress (1919) - Count de Suchet (the elder)
- The Siren's Song (1919) - Hector Remey
- Happiness a la Mode (1919) - Attorney Logan
- Evangeline (1919) - Father Felician
- Luck in Pawn (1919) - William Rainier
- A Master Stroke (1920) - Hodge
- Under Crimson Skies (1920) - Plum Duff Hargis
- The Red Lane (1920) - Father Leclair
- The Breath of the Gods (1920) - Count Ronsard
- Merely Mary Ann (1920) - Vicar
- Kismet (1920) - Afife
- They Shall Pay (1921) - Henry Seldon
- Bring Him In (1921) - Braganza
- Up and Going (1922) - Father Le Claire (in play)
- Bluebeard's 8th Wife (1923) - Marquis DeBriac
- Bag and Baggage (1923) - Philip Anthony
- Fighting for Justice (1924) - Sam Culvert
- Which Shall It Be? (1924) - Musicmaster
- Mademoiselle Midnight (1924) - Napoleon III (Prologue)
- The Fatal Mistake (1924)
- Honor Among Men (1924) - Baron Barrat
- Tainted Money (1924)
- The Silent Accuser (1924) - Stepfather
- The Folly of Vanity (1924) - Old Roué (fantasy sequence)
- Soft Shoes (1925) - Dummy O'Day
- Excuse Me (1925) - Rev. Job Wales
- Déclassée (1925) - Henri
- The Verdict (1925) - Butler
- Boys Will Be Joys (1925) - Sheik Rustum
- A Lover's Oath (1925) Sheik Rustum
- The Speed Limit (1926) - Mr. Charles Benson
- For Heaven's Sake (1926) - Brother Paul, The Optimist
- Blonde or Brunette (1927) - Butler
- Sinews of Steel (1927) - Jan Van Der Vetter
- The King of Kings (1927) - (uncredited)
- Hidden Aces (1927) - Serge Demidoff
- Broadway After Midnight (1927)
- The Wagon Show (1928) - Joey
- Marry the Girl (1928) - The Butler
- Skyscraper (1928) - Redhead's father
- Isle of Lost Men (1928) - Preacher Jason
- Code of the Air (1928) - Doc Carson
- The Tiger's Shadow (1928) - Martin Meeker
- Lady of the Pavements (1929) - Prussian Diplomat (uncredited)
- The Leatherneck (1929) - Petrovitch
- Viennese Nights (1930) - Man in Vienna Opera Box (uncredited)
- The Murder Trial of Mary Dugan (1931) - Präsident Nash
- The Mask Falls (1931)
- Liebe auf Befehl (1931) - Dr. Munaterra
- The Vanishing Legion (1931) - Oil Co. Director Larribee
- The Miracle Woman (1931) - Florence's Father (uncredited)
- Bad Company (1931) - Meyer - the Tailor (uncredited)
- Soul of the Slums (1931) - Brother Jacob
- Broken Lullaby (1932) - Townsman (uncredited)
- Back Street (1932) - Adolph Schmidt - Ray's Father
- The Vampire Bat (1933) - Dr. Holdstadt (uncredited)
- Luxury Liner (1933) - Father with 20 Marks (uncredited)
- Topaze (1933) - Chestnut Vendor (uncredited)
- Neighbors' Wives (1933) - Otto
- After Tonight (1933) - Concessionaire (uncredited)
- The House of Rothschild (1934) - Man in 1780 Sequence (uncredited)
- Guilty Parents (1934) - Juror (uncredited)
- I'll Tell the World (1934) - Telegraph Operator (uncredited)
- All Men Are Enemies (1934) - Landlord (uncredited)
- The Black Cat (1934) - Stationmaster (uncredited)
- Lottery Lover (1935) - Eiffel Tower Attendant (uncredited)
- One More Spring (1935) - Minor Role (uncredited)
- The Black Room (1935) - A Peasant (uncredited)
- Condemned to Live (1935) - Old Village Doctor (uncredited)
- Just My Luck (1935) - Graves
- The Invisible Ray (1936) - Monsieur Noyer
- Lady of Secrets (1936) - Dr. Claudel (uncredited)
- The Story of Louis Pasteur (1936) - Minor Role (uncredited)
- Sutter's Gold (1936) - Townsman (uncredited)
- Dracula's Daughter (1936) - Transylvania Innkeeper (uncredited)
- Anthony Adverse (1936) - Butler (uncredited)
- Ladies in Love (1936) - Waiter (uncredited)
- Come Closer, Folks (1936) - Schlemmer (uncredited)
- Espionage (1937) - French Telegrapher (uncredited)
- Maytime (1937) - Prompter (uncredited)
- Thin Ice (1937) - (uncredited)
- The Gold Racket (1937) - Daniel Forbes, Assayer (uncredited)
- The Road Back (1937) - Member of Dinner Party (uncredited)
- Confession (1937) - Courtroom Reporter (uncredited)
- Lancer Spy (1937) - Schreiber, Hotel Manager (uncredited)
- Prescription for Romance (1937) - Peasant (uncredited)
- Little Tough Guy (1938) - Proprietor (uncredited)
- The Great Waltz (1938) - Organ Grinder (uncredited)
- Disbarred (1939) - Warehouse Watchman (uncredited)
- Never Say Die (1939) - Concierge (uncredited)
- Ninotchka (1939) - Vladimir - With Letter from Leon (uncredited)
- I Can't Give You Anything But Love, Baby (1940) - Piano Tuner (uncredited)
- Four Sons (1940) - Peasant (uncredited)
- The Great Dictator (1940) - Mr. Agar
- A Dispatch from Reuters (1940) - Professor Gauss (uncredited)
- I Wake Up Screaming (1941) - Gus-Delicatessen Proprietor (uncredited)
- Joan of Paris (1942) - Janitor
- Crossroads (1942) - Old Man (uncredited)
- Berlin Correspondent (1942) - Patron (uncredited)
- Miss V from Moscow (1942) - Henri Devallier
- Reunion in France (1942) - Old Man (uncredited)
- The Moon Is Down (1943) - Elderly Man (uncredited)
- Above Suspicion (1943) - Elderly Man (uncredited)
- Paris After Dark (1943) - News Dealer (uncredited)
- Happy Land (1943) - Pop Schmidt (uncredited)
- Passport to Destiny (1944) - Berlin Hotel Proprietor (uncredited)
- The Hitler Gang (1944) - Manservant (uncredited)
- The Hairy Ape (1944) - Doctor (uncredited)
- A Tree Grows in Brooklyn (1945) - Candy Store Proprietor (uncredited)
- Where Do We Go from Here? (1945) - Dutch Councilman (uncredited)
- Bewitched (1945) - The Governor's Butler (uncredited)
