= Betty to the Rescue =

1917 film by Frank Reicher

- Directed by: Frank Reicher
- Screenplay by: Beatrice DeMille; Leighton Osmun
- Produced by: Frank Reicher
- Starring: Fannie Ward; Jack Dean; Lillian Leighton; James Neill; Charles West; Taylor N. Duncan
- Production company: Famous Players–Lasky Corporation
- Distributed by: Paramount Pictures
- Release date: January 15, 1917
- Running time: 50 minutes
- Country: United States
- Language: English

Betty to the Rescue is a 1917 American silent film. It is a comedy directed by Frank Reicher and written by Beatrice DeMille and Leighton Osmun. The film stars Fannie Ward, Jack Dean, Lillian Leighton, James Neill, Charles West and Taylor N. Duncan. The film was released on January 15, 1917, by Paramount Pictures.

== Plot ==
Nobody tells Betty that the inherited gold mine is worth nothing. Entrusted to John Kenwood and his mother after her father's death, the girl also ignores that the costs of her maintenance for a luxurious school are borne by Kenwood himself. Who refuses — for sentimental reasons — to sell the mine to a certain Fleming, an engineer who tries to get his hands on it because he has found a rich vein of gold. When Kenwood loses his oranges crop to the frost, resulting in ruin, Betty discovers the guardian's generosity and feels indebted to him. She will be able to repay him because she too will find the gold vein, realizing, at the same time, that she loves John.

== Cast ==
- Fannie Ward as Betty Sherwin
- Jack Dean as John Kenwood
- Lillian Leighton as Constance Kenwood
- James Neill as Henry Sherwin
- Charles West as Fleming
- Taylor N. Duncan as Big Jim
