= Margaret Illington =

American actress

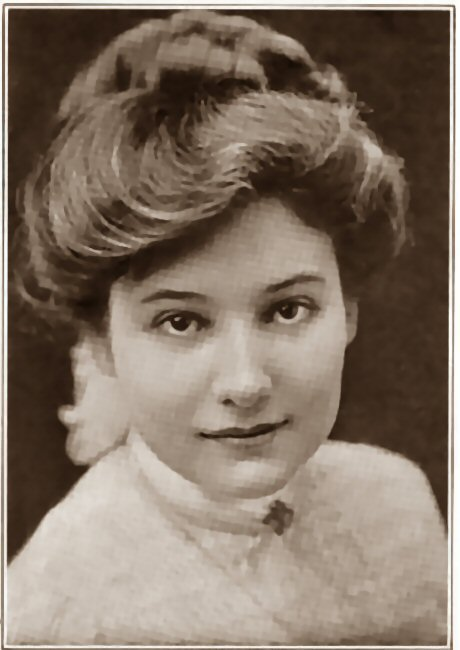
- Illington featured in Theatre Magazine, 1906
- Born: Maude Light; July 23, 1879; Bloomington, Illinois, U.S.
- Died: March 11, 1934 (aged 54); Miami, Florida, U.S.
- Resting place: Sleepy Hollow Cemetery
- Other name: Margaret Illington Bowes
- Occupation: Actress
- Years active: 1900–1919
- Spouses: Daniel Frohman (m. 1903; div. 1909) Major Bowes (m. 1910)

Margaret Illington (born Maude Light; July 23, 1879 – March 11, 1934) was an American stage actress popular in the first decade of the 20th century. She later made an attempt at silent film acting by making two films with Adolph Zukor's Famous Players–Lasky franchise.

== Biography ==
Maude Light was born on July 23, 1879, in Bloomington, Illinois, to I.H. Light and his wife, Mary Ellen. She was educated at Illinois Wesleyan University and then for two years was a pupil at Conway's Dramatic School in Chicago.

She made her Broadway debut in 1900 and a few years later she married Broadway impresario Daniel Frohman in 1903 making her a sister-in-law of powerful theater owner Charles Frohman. The marriage didn't last the decade and ended in 1909 but her association with Frohman was a tremendous boost to her career. An early Broadway success was The Two Orphans, 1904, co-starring Grace George. She and George played the sisters later played famously by Lillian and Dorothy Gish in D. W. Griffith's 1921 film Orphans of the Storm.

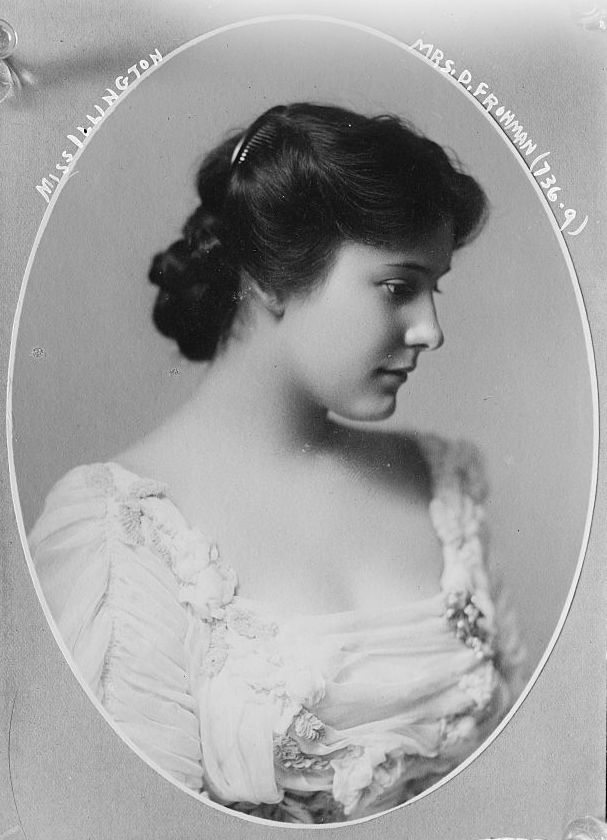
The year of her divorce from Daniel Frohman, 1909

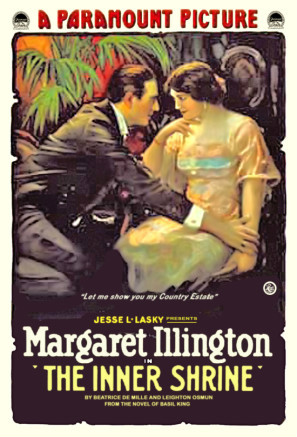
Poster for Inner Shrine, one of two 1917 features Illington made for Adolph Zukor and Jesse Lasky.

Illington married Edward Bowes in 1910 and desired to have a baby according to newspaper accounts that interviewed her. But it was not to be and she continued in plays. One of her best known plays at this time was Kindling later turned into a 1916 silent film by Cecil B. DeMille, but minus Illington. Illington did have some filmmaking experience appearing (uncredited) in Edwin Porter's popular 1905 The Train Wreckers as the female lead. In 1917 Illington decided to try her hand at feature moviemaking and signed with Adolph Zukor and Jesse Lasky. She starred in The Inner Shrine and Sacrifice, both directed by stage actor Frank Reicher. Zukor famously visited her on the set during the making of The Inner Shrine. When her two films were completed she returned to the stage and remained for about two years before retiring in 1919.

In 1906 she was painted by the Swiss-born American society painter Adolfo Müller-Ury, a three-quarter seated portrait wearing a gown from the play "Mrs Leffingwall's Boots", which was exhibited at the gallery of M. Knoedler & Co., Fifth Avenue that December. Müller-Ury sent the picture to the Paris Salon in 1907 (No. 1191), and exhibited it three times more in 1908 in New York, Washington and Philadelphia. It was reproduced in The Metropolitan Magazine, Vol. XXV, No. 1, 5 October 1906.

On March 11, 1934, Illington died in St. Francis Hospital in Miami, Florida.
