= The Train Wreckers =

1905 film

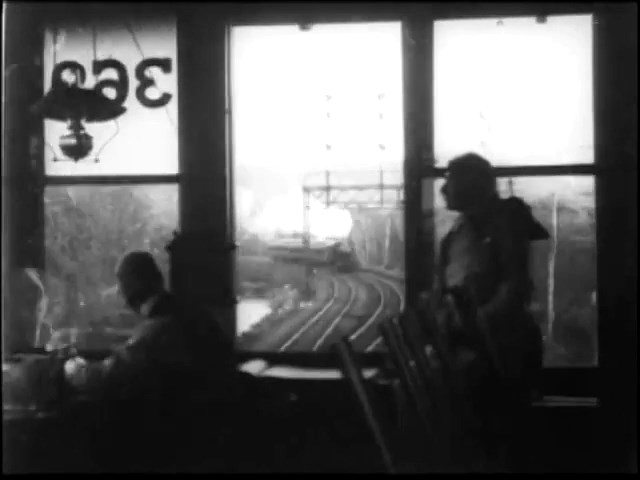
- Screenshot: The railroad switch cabin
- Directed by: Edwin S. Porter
- Starring: Broncho Billy Anderson; Margaret Illington
- Cinematography: Edwin S. Porter
- Production company: Edison Manufacturing Company
- Release date: 27 November 1905
- Running time: 12 min.
- Country: United States
- Languages: Silent; English intertitles

The Train Wreckers is a 1905 American silent drama film, directed by Edwin S. Porter. In the film, the daughter of a railway switchman and lover of a locomotive engineer defeats outlaws trying to derail a train.

== Plot ==
The Train Wreckers (1905)

The daughter of a switchman, after having wished good morning to her lover, a locomotive engineer, and brought her father his lunch, overhears a group of outlaws planning to derail her lover's train. The outlaws capture her and tie her to a tree. She manages to escape with the help of her dog and successfully warns the locomotive engineer. Once the track has been cleared and the train has left, the train wreckers come back to knock her out and leave her on the tracks to be run over. The engineer positions himself on the incoming locomotive's cowcatcher and rescues her from certain death. The locomotive is then uncoupled from the train and the railroad personnel chases and overpower the desperados who had fled on a handcar.

== Cast ==
- Broncho Billy Anderson as the last train wrecker
- Margaret Illington as the switchman's daughter

== Release and reception ==
The film was released in November 1905. It was the most popular Edison film made in 1905, selling 157 prints in 1905–06.

Charles Musser considers that this film "effectively demonstrates the need for social cohesion in a way that could serve as a prototype for future good-guy-versus-bad-guy conflicts".

== Analysis ==
The film is composed of 14 wide shots without any intertitles, all shots on location, several shots using camera panning. Cross-cutting and continuity editing are used to show actions developing over several shots in different locations. Shot 12 (see list of shots below) is shown in reverse motion: The train was filmed backing up after the actor playing the engineer had dropped a dummy on the track. This gives the impression that he catches the girl just before she is run over by the train.

1. The porch of a house with a dog. A woman comes out and greets her approaching lover, a locomotive engineer, who pats the dog and continues his walk while she waves at him.

2. A railway switch cabin with the woman and her father. A train passes by and she moves a switch for him.

3. The outside of the switch cabin. The woman comes down the steps and leaves, waving at her father in the cabin.

4. The woman crosses a train track and walks up an embankment. The camera pans to follow her.

5. A clearing in the woods with a group of men sitting on the ground, discussing. The woman walks on a path towards them. When she sees them she hides between a tree but a sentry sees her. They catch her, gag her, tie her to a tree and run away.

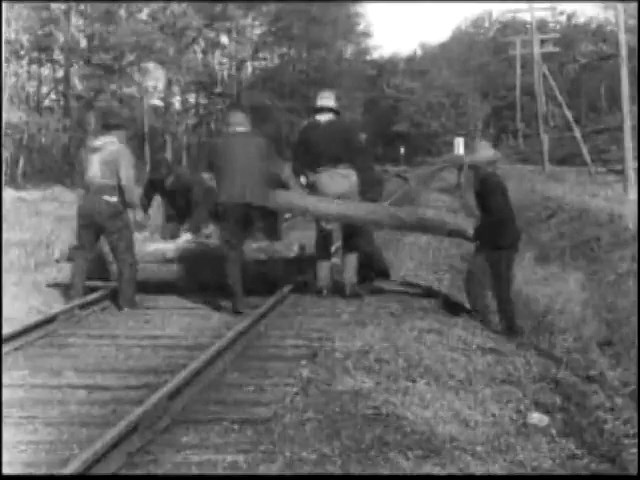
Shot 6

6. A train track in the country. The men block the track with several wooden ties and hide away.

7. Same as shot 5. The dog unties the woman who signals him to raise the alarm. She runs in the opposite direction.

8. Other view of the switch cabin seen in shot 3. The dog comes in running and climbs the stairs before coming down again and running away followed by a man.

9. Same as shot 6. The woman unsuccessfully tries to remove the ties and runs out onto the track. She takes off her petticoat and waves it as a flag to an incoming train, which allows the engineer to stop just before the obstruction. The engineer and some passengers clear the track and thank her before the train leaves again.

10. The woman walks towards the camera on the train track, not noticing a man who comes out of the woods behind her and knocks her unconscious. The bandits drag her on the track and run away.

11. A railway shack. The bandits use a beam as a ram to break the door open. They take a handcar out of the shack and ride away with it. The camera pans left, then right to follow them.

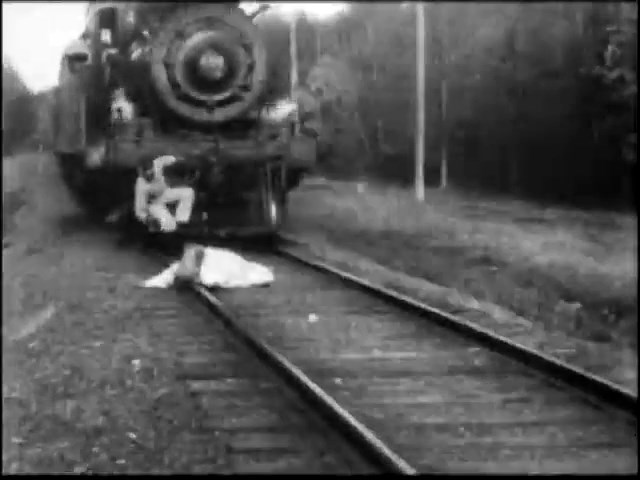
Shot 12

12. Same as shot 10. The woman is lying unconscious on the rails while a train is approaching. The engineer crouching on the locomotive's cowcatcher manages to catch her just before she is run over (reverse motion trick).

13. Other view of a train track with the engineer holding the woman in front of the locomotive. The train stops and two engineers come to help their colleagues to hold the woman, still unconscious, while passengers come to their help. The locomotive is uncoupled and steams away while the woman is helped into the train.

14. Other view of the train track. The bandits are riding on the handcar, closely followed by the locomotive with a man in front shooting at them.

15. Other view of the train track. The bandits on the handcar are shooting back at the locomotive.

16. Other view of the train track. The locomotive catches up with the handcar. The bandits leave it and run away while the shooting continues until they are finally overpowered.

== See also ==
- Edwin S. Porter filmography
