= F. E. Mills Young =

English writer

Florence Ethel Mills Young (1875 – 6 November 1945) was an English writer of popular fiction.

== Work ==
Born in Twickenham, Middlesex, United Kingdom, in 1875, Young wrote 50 novels between 1910 and 1941. Her early works were often about the English in southern Africa.

Her novel, Myles Calthrope I. D. B., was filmed as Thou Art the Man in 1920. A Mistaken Marriage (1908) contains highly negative Jewish characters, as do many novels about South Africa in that period, in connection with illegal diamond selling. The main character is said by the heroine to have "the ugliest smile she had ever seen distort a human face." Noting the publication of The Purple Mists, The Spectator comments in 1914 that it features "a strong, silent man", and adds: "Miss Young writes with remarkable fluency and has a strong grip of the plot." At least one of her novels was translated into German.

She died in Three Anchor Bay, Cape Town, South Africa at 6 November 1945.
