= Thou Art the Man (film) =

1920 film by Thomas N. Heffron

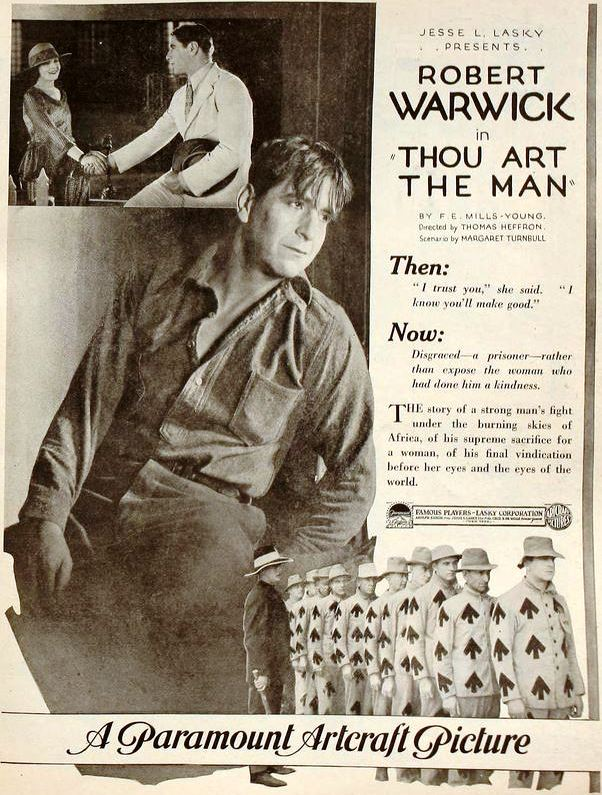
- Advertisement for film
- Directed by: Thomas N. Heffron; W. N. Sherer (ass't. director)
- Written by: Margaret Turnbull (scenario)
- Based on: Myles Calthorpe, I.D.B. by F. E. Mills Young
- Produced by: Adolph Zukor; Jesse L. Lasky
- Starring: Robert Warwick; Lois Wilson
- Cinematography: Victor Ackland
- Distributed by: Paramount Pictures Artcraft
- Release date: May 30, 1920
- Running time: 5 reels
- Country: United States
- Language: Silent (English intertitles)

Thou Art the Man is a lost 1920 American silent drama film produced by Famous Players–Lasky and released through Paramount Pictures. Thomas N. Heffron directed the film which starred stage and matinee idol Robert Warwick and Lois Wilson. It is based on a novel, Myles Calthorpe, I.D.B. by F. E. Mills Young, with a screenplay by Margaret Turnbull.

== Plot ==
Based upon a description in a film publication, Myles Calthrope is an English soldier of fortune who drifts into the diamond mining fields of South Africa and finds employment with some diamond smugglers who masquerade as feather merchants. When he comes to suspect their true business, Myles is dismissed. He then goes to Cape Town where he falls in love with Joan Farrant. She helps him to get a job with her brother, who is also secretly a smuggler. The police arrest Myles in an illicit enterprise of which he has no knowledge, and he goes to prison for three years. Eventually the real criminals are arrested, and Myles finds happiness with Joan.

== Cast ==
- Robert Warwick as Myles Calthrope
- Lois Wilson as Joan Farrant
- Jean M. Dumont as Henry Farrant
- Clarence Burton as Matt Solomon
- Clarence Geldart as George Brummage (billed as Charles H. Geldert)
- Harry Carter as Mr. Prescott
- Viora Daniel as Fannie Dering
- Lorenza Lazzarini as Lucille
- Lillian Leighton as Cook
- Sylvia Ashton as Chaperone
- Joan Marsh as Ellie Prescott (billed as Dorothy Rosher)
- Richard Wayne as Tom Dering
- Jane Wolfe as Mrs. Prescott

== Preservation ==
With no holdings located in archives, Thou Art the Man is considered a lost film.
