= The Case of Becky (1915 film) =

1915 film by Frank Reicher

- Directed by: Frank Reicher
- Screenplay by: David Belasco (play); Edward Locke (play); Margaret Turnbull
- Produced by: David Belasco; Jesse L. Lasky
- Starring: Blanche Sweet; Theodore Roberts; James Neill; Carlyle Blackwell; Jane Wolfe; Gertrude Kellar
- Cinematography: Walter Stradling
- Production company: Jesse L. Lasky Feature Play Company
- Distributed by: Paramount Pictures
- Release date: September 13, 1915
- Running time: 5 reels
- Country: United States
- Language: Silent (English intertitles)

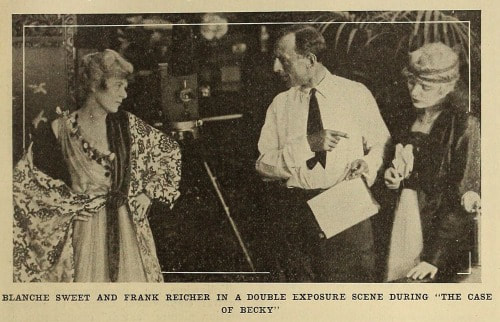
Double exposure scene in The Case of Becky with actress Blanche Sweet (playing Becky and Dorothy) and director Frank Reicher.

The Case of Becky is a 1915 American silent drama film directed by Frank Reicher. It was adapted by Margaret Turnbull from the 1912 play of the same name by David Belasco and Edward Locke. The film stars Blanche Sweet, Theodore Roberts, James Neill, Carlyle Blackwell, Jane Wolfe, and Gertrude Kellar. The film was released on September 13, 1915, by Paramount Pictures. The film was later remade in 1921 under the same title.

== Plot ==
Dorothy, victim of the influence that the hypnotist Balzamo has on her, the man who raised her, develops a second personality with a malevolent character named Becky. When Balzamo tries to win the girl, she runs away. Meanwhile, Dr. Emerson, a specialist in nerve diseases, encourages Dr. John Arnold to use his hypnotic powers to heal the sick and tells him that those powers are dangerous because his wife had been the victim of a hypnotist years earlier, who l 'had kidnapped. After the woman's death, all traces of her little girl had been lost.

Dorothy, after her escape, looks for jobs to live on. But when she finds them, Becky's personality re-emerges and makes her lose them. When Dorothy becomes friends with Dr. Emerson's sister, she transforms into Becky and the doctor diagnoses her with a case of split personality. Arnold, who has fallen in love with Dorothy, is ready to "kill" Becky, but suddenly Balzamo reappears trying to regain control of the young woman. A mental struggle arises between Balzamo and Arnold which has the doctor as its winner: Balzamo is forced to confess that Dorothy is Emerson's daughter. Having lost his powers, Balzamo goes away. Dorothy is now free to love Arnold.

== Cast ==
- Blanche Sweet as Dorothy / Becky
- Theodore Roberts as Balzamo
- James Neill as Dr. Emerson
- Carlyle Blackwell as Dr. John Arnold
- Jane Wolfe as Carrie, Balzamo's assistant
- Gertrude Kellar as Miss Emerson, Dr. Emerson's sister

== Preservation status ==
A copy is held at the Library of Congress Packard Campus for Audio-Visual Conservation.
