= A Very Good Young Man =

1919 film by Donald Crisp

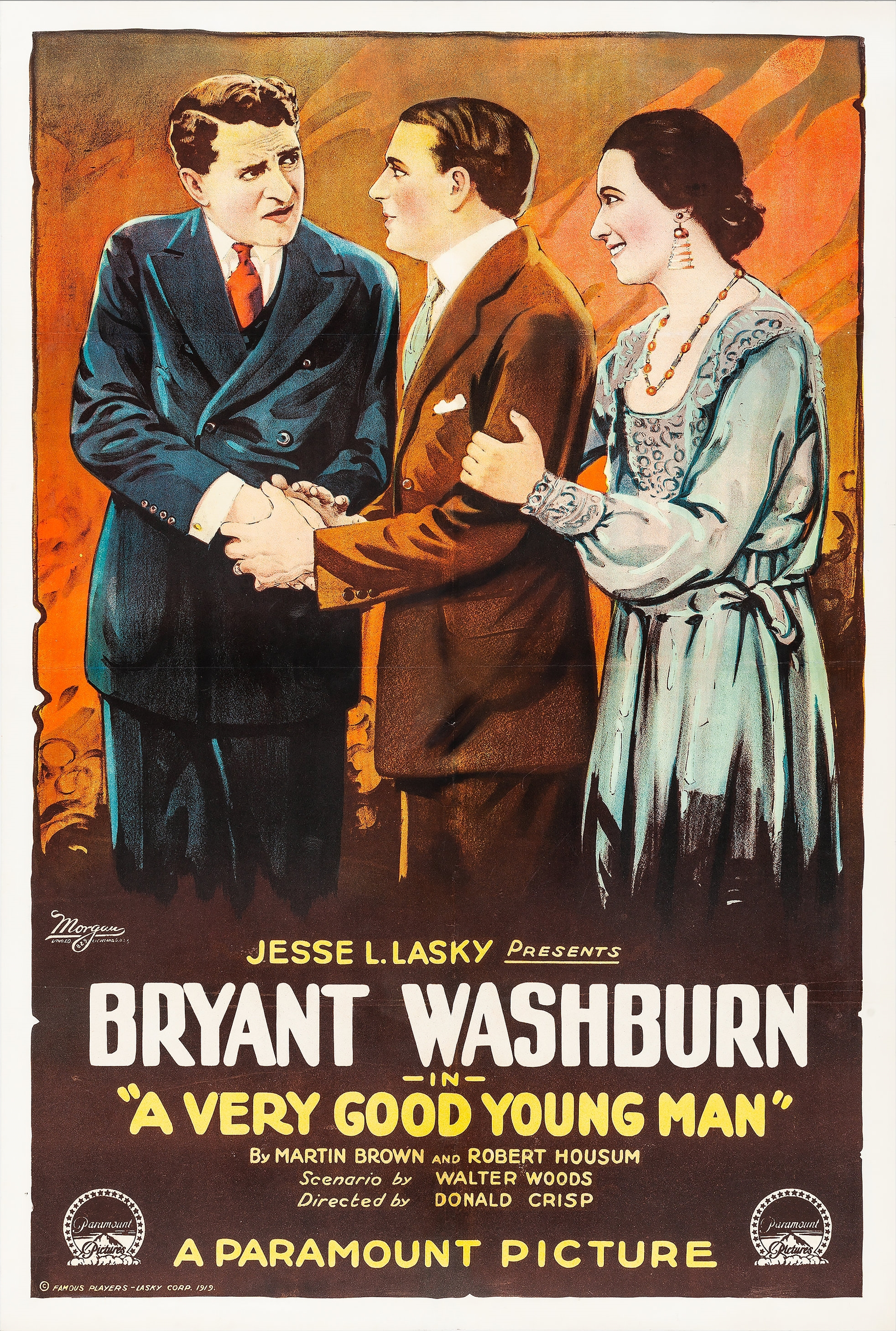
- Theatrical release poster
- Directed by: Donald Crisp
- Screenplay by: Martin Brown; Robert Housum; Walter Woods
- Produced by: Jesse L. Lasky
- Starring: Bryant Washburn; Helene Chadwick; Julia Faye; Sylvia Ashton; Jane Wolfe; Helen Jerome Eddy; Wade Boteler
- Cinematography: Charles Edgar Schoenbaum
- Production company: Famous Players–Lasky Corporation
- Distributed by: Paramount Pictures
- Release date: July 6, 1919
- Running time: 50 minutes
- Country: United States
- Language: Silent (English intertitles)

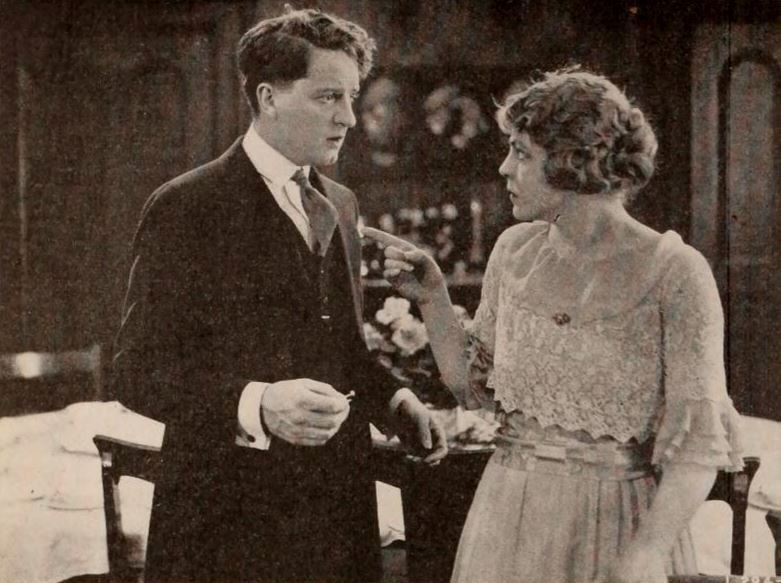
Bryant Washburn and Helene Chadwick in A Very Good Young Man

A Very Good Young Man is a lost 1919 American silent comedy film directed by Donald Crisp, written by Martin Brown, Robert Housum, and Walter Woods, and starring Bryant Washburn, Helene Chadwick, Julia Faye, Sylvia Ashton, Jane Wolfe, Helen Jerome Eddy, and Wade Boteler. It was released on July 6, 1919, by Paramount Pictures.

== Plot ==
As described in a film magazine, LeRoy Sylvester, a very good young man, is engaged to Ruth Douglas, whose well meaning sister Kitty points out to her the fact that no young man so exemplary in his habits before marriage can be humanly expected to continue his model behavior after it. Ruth informs Leroy of his unsuspected shortcoming and he sets out to prove he is a villain of the deepest dye. Osprey Bacchus, the dowdy daughter of a lady undertaker, is pressed into service as his companion on his first wild evening. He seeks to bring himself into proper disrepute by flirting with a fascinating lady met at the roof garden, posing as the thief who stole some valuable jewels that have disappeared, resisting an officer, and other escapades, but all in vain. Circumstance saves him despite his best efforts, and Ruth finally consents to marry him despite his lily white reputation.

== Cast ==
- Bryant Washburn as LeRoy Sylvester
- Helene Chadwick as Ruth Douglas
- Julia Faye as Kitty Douglas
- Sylvia Ashton as Mrs. Douglas
- Jane Wolfe as Mrs. Mandelharper
- Helen Jerome Eddy as Osprey Bacchus
- Wade Boteler as Tom Hurley
- Anna Q. Nilsson as Viva Bacchus
- Noah Beery, Sr. as Blood
- Edmund Burns as Adrian Love
- Mayme Kelso as Mrs. Love
- Charles West
