= The Fortune Teller (1920 film) =

1920 film by Albert Capellani

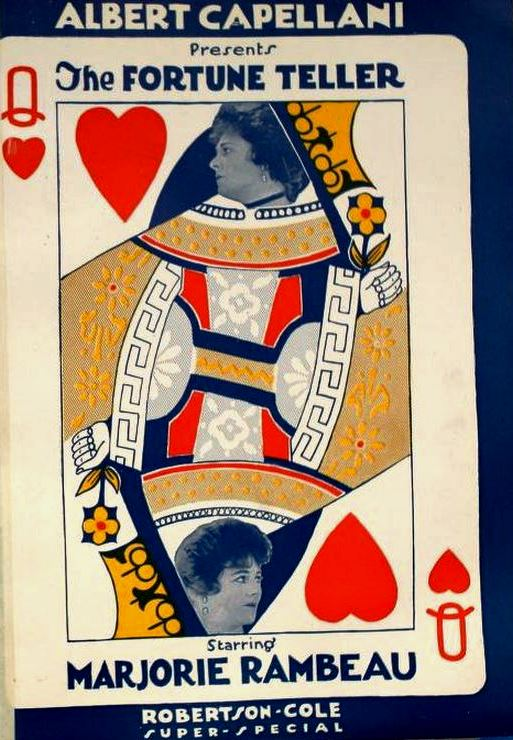
- Advertisement
- Directed by: Albert Capellani
- Written by: George DuBois Proctor
- Based on: The Fortune Teller by Leighton Graves Osmum
- Produced by: Albert Capellani
- Starring: Marjorie Rambeau
- Cinematography: Jacques Monteran
- Distributed by: Robertson-Cole Distributing Corporation
- Release date: May 9, 1920
- Running time: 70 minutes
- Country: United States
- Language: Silent (English intertitles)

The Fortune Teller is a lost 1920 American silent drama film directed by Albert Capellani and starring Marjorie Rambeau. It is based on a 1919 Broadway play, The Fortune Teller, by Leighton Graves Osmun. The film was distributed by Robertson-Cole Distributors.

== Plot ==
As described in a film magazine, Renee (Rambeau) finds herself unhappily married to scientist Horation Browning (Burton) with her baby being her only comfort. The monotony of her life is broken temporarily when gambler Tony Salviatti (Fernandez) attempts to commit suicide near the Browning home and is brought in. Renee assists in nursing him back to health, and Tony attempts to pay attentions to her. Horation sees this, becomes unreasonable in his jealousy and anger, and drives his wife from the house while keeping their son. Renee becomes a fortune teller in a circus that Tony starts and travels with him for twenty years, drinking heavily during this time. Her son Stephen (McKee) grows into manhood, but he does not make good at anything as he lacks assertion and receives no sympathy from his father. Fate leads him to Mme. Renee's fortune telling booth. She learns his identity and then quits the circus, quits drinking and braces up, and becomes Stephen's guiding hand. Stephen is elected to the state legislature and marries the governor's daughter.

== Cast ==
- Marjorie Rambeau as Renee Browning
- Frederick Burton as Horation Browning
- E.L. Fernandez as Tony Salviatti
- Raymond McKee as Stephen Browning
- Franklyn Hanna as Gov. Leonard
- Virginia Lee as Governor's daughter
- T. Morse Koupal as Jim, the strong man
- Cyprian Gilles as Lottie
