= Each Pearl a Tear =

1916 film by George Melford

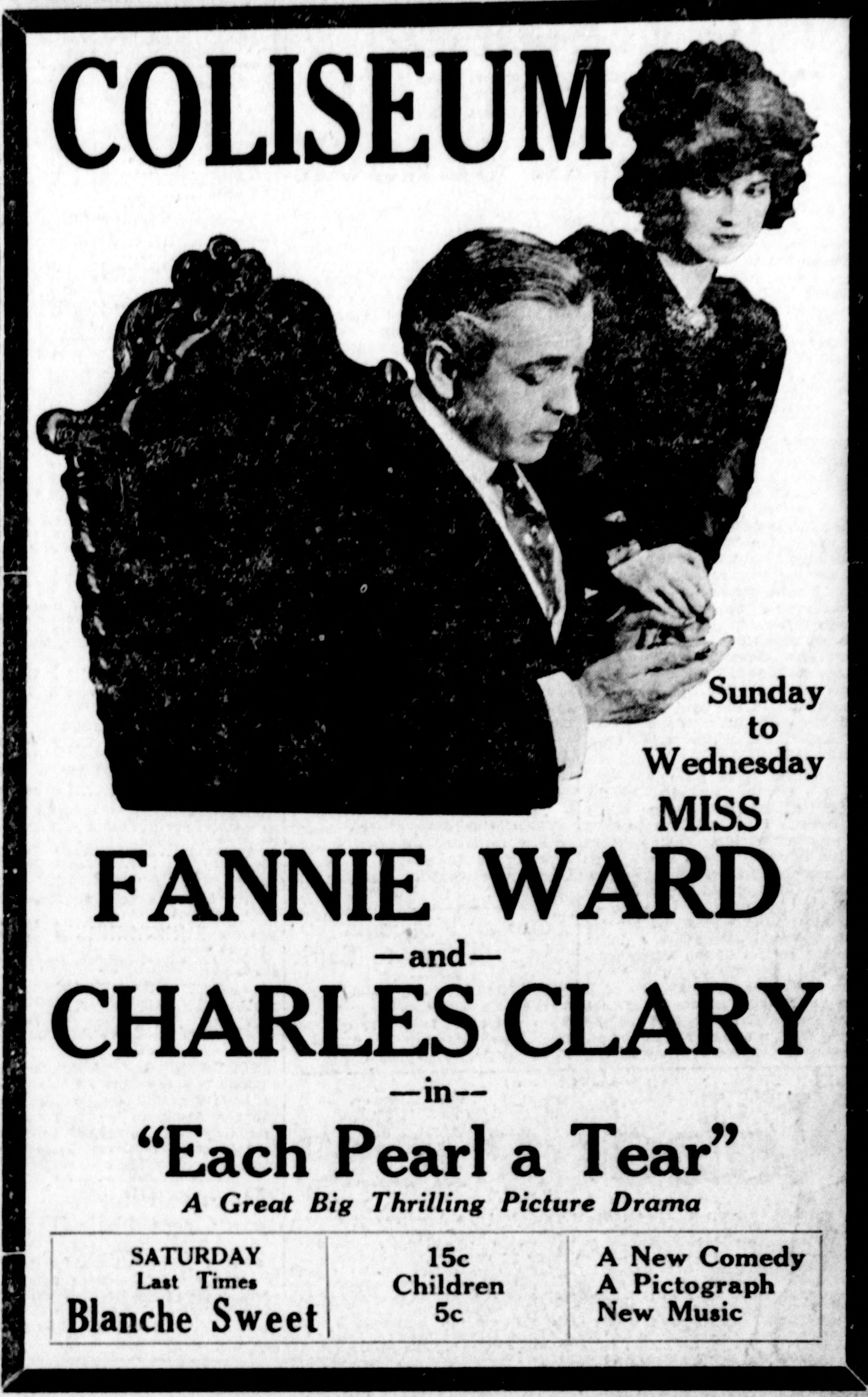
- Newspaper advertisement
- Directed by: George Melford
- Screenplay by: Beatrice DeMille; Leighton Osmun
- Story by: E. Lloyd Sheldon
- Produced by: Jesse L. Lasky
- Starring: Fannie Ward; Charles Clary; Jack Dean; Paul Weigel; Jane Wolfe; Ben Alexander
- Cinematography: Percy Hilburn (French)
- Production company: Jesse L. Lasky Feature Play Company
- Distributed by: Paramount Pictures
- Release date: August 31, 1916
- Running time: 50 minutes
- Country: United States
- Languages: Silent; English intertitles

Each Pearl a Tear is a surviving 1916 American silent drama film directed by George Melford and written by Beatrice DeMille and Leighton Osmun. The film stars Fannie Ward, Charles Clary, Jack Dean, Paul Weigel, Jane Wolfe and Ben Alexander. The film was released on August 31, 1916, by Paramount Pictures.

== Plot ==
A woman named Diane Winston is introduced, by her father, to an unscrupulous stockbroker. But Diane is already in love with someone else, the stockbroker's secretary named John Clarke. The stockbroker loans an expensive pearl necklace to Diane and she gives it to John to return to the stockbroker. The stockbroker pretends to have not received the necklace back. Her father dies from shock, and Diane decides to work for the stockbroker in order to pay back her debt to him. John decides to enter the stock-market to raise money. The stockbroker tries to use his money to destroy John's chances. Diane finds the necklace in the stockbroker's office and realizes he lied about it. She takes it and sells it and gives the money to John. He uses the money to fight against the stockbroker's attacks and ends up making a lot of money on the market so that they can make plans for marriage.

== Cast ==
- Fannie Ward as Diane Winston
- Charles Clary as Pul Lorillard
- Jack Dean as John Clarke
- Paul Weigel as Roger Winston
- Jane Wolfe as Mrs. Van Sant
- Ben Alexander

== Preservation status ==
- The film is preserved in the Library of Congress collection, Packard Campus for Audio-Visual Conservation.
