= Unconquered (1917 film) =

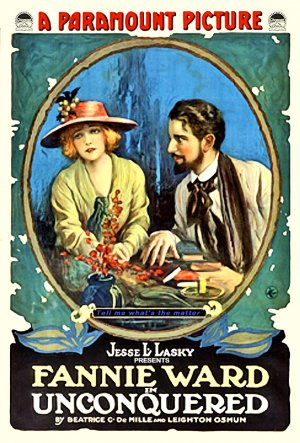
- Theatrical release poster
- Directed by: Frank Reicher
- Screenplay by: Beatrice DeMille; Leighton Osmun
- Produced by: Jesse L. Lasky
- Starring: Fannie Ward; Jack Dean; Hobart Bosworth; Tully Marshall; Mabel Van Buren; Jane Wolfe
- Cinematography: Dent Gilbert
- Production company: Jesse L. Lasky Feature Play Company
- Distributed by: Paramount Pictures
- Release date: May 31, 1917
- Running time: 50 minutes
- Country: United States
- Language: Silent...English intertitles

Unconquered is a lost 1917 American drama silent film directed by Frank Reicher and written by Beatrice DeMille and Leighton Osmun. The film stars Fannie Ward, Jack Dean, Hobart Bosworth, Tully Marshall, Mabel Van Buren and Jane Wolfe. The film was released on May 31, 1917, by Paramount Pictures.

== Plot ==
According to a film magazine, "Mrs. Lenning, a designing widow, tells Jackson that his wife is weaning Billy's affection from him. Jackson commands his wife to call upon Mrs. Lenning and invite her to visit them at their Florida home, threatening to take only Billy with him if she refuses. In Florida Mrs. Jackson and Billy meet Richard Darcia, a writer, and become very friendly with him. In the meantime Mrs. Lenning is gradually winning Jackson, who demands a divorce from his wife, asking for the custody of Billy. They purposely allow Mrs. Jackson to overhear a conversation which will induce her to run away with Billy. They surprise her in Richard's home. Jackson secures a divorce and the boy. Jackson realizes his wife's mother-love for Billy when she is about to sacrifice her life for the boy. Mrs. Jackson is made doubly happy by the return of Billy and her new-found love in Richard."

== Cast ==
- Fannie Ward as Mrs. Jackson
- Jack Dean as Richard Darcier
- Hobart Bosworth as Henry Jackson
- Tully Marshall as Juke
- Mabel Van Buren as Mrs. Lenning
- Jane Wolfe as Voodoo Queen
- Billy Jacobs as Little Billy

== Censorship ==
Before Unconquered could be exhibited in Kansas, the Kansas Board of Review required the elimination of all card games in reels 3 and 4.
