= The Years of the Locust =

1916 film by George Melford

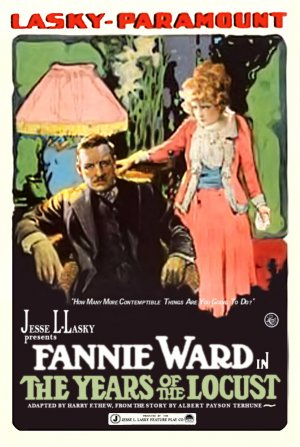
- Theatrical release poster
- Directed by: George Melford
- Screenplay by: Beatrice deMille; Leighton Osmun; Albert Payson Terhune; Harvey F. Thew
- Produced by: Jesse L. Lasky
- Starring: Fannie Ward; Walter Long; Jack Dean; Martin Best; Charles Ogle
- Cinematography: Percy Hilburn (French)
- Production company: Jesse L. Lasky Feature Play Company
- Distributed by: Paramount Pictures
- Release date: November 16, 1916
- Running time: 50 minutes
- Country: United States
- Language: Silent (English intertitles)

The Years of the Locust is a surviving 1916 American silent drama film directed by George Melford and written by Beatrice deMille, Leighton Osmun, Albert Payson Terhune and Harvey F. Thew. The film stars Fannie Ward, Walter Long, Jack Dean, Martin Best and Charles Ogle. The film was released on November 16, 1916, by Paramount Pictures.

== Plot ==
Though in love with Dirck Mead, Lorraine is forced to marry wealthy Aaron Roth to save her family from financial ruin. The husband, however, turns out to be a scoundrel, a swindler who, chased by the police, to escape the law, throws himself from a steamer. Roth is given up for dead. Mead, meanwhile, has become a diamond tycoon. After marrying Lorraine, he takes her with him to South Africa. Roth, who is not dead, finds his wife and blackmails her, threatening to denounce her as bigamous. Lorraine decides to leave Mead, but when she discovers that Roth plans to steal a precious diamond her husband is escorting around town, she steps in, asking for help. In the ensuing turmoil, Roth is killed, also solving Lorraine's marital status problem.

== Cast ==
- Fannie Ward as Lorraine Roth
- Walter Long as Aaron Roth
- Jack Dean as Dirck Mead
- Martin Best as Williams, Roth's Secretary
- Charles Ogle as McKenzie, Mead's Mine Manager

== Preservation status ==
The film is preserved in the UCLA Film & Television Archive.
