= The Jaguar's Claws =

1917 film

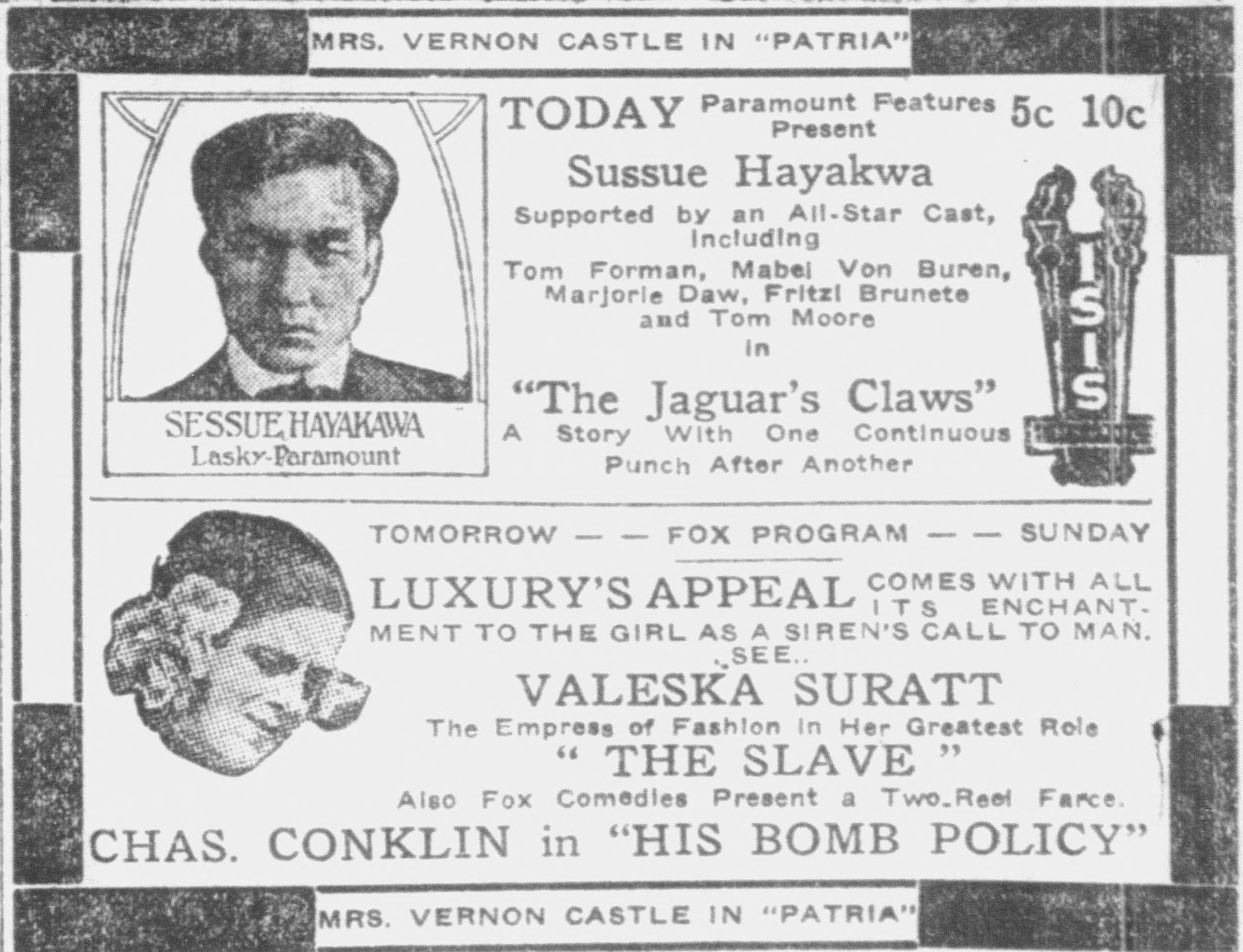
- A contemporary advertisement for The Slave (bottom) along with an advertisement for The Jaguar's Claws (top)
- Directed by: Marshall Neilan
- Screenplay by: William M. McCoy; Beatrice DeMille; Leighton Osmun
- Produced by: Jesse L. Lasky
- Starring: Sessue Hayakawa; Fritzi Brunette; Tom Moore; Marjorie Daw; Tom Forman; Mabel Van Buren
- Cinematography: Walter Stradling
- Production company: Jesse L. Lasky Feature Play Company
- Distributed by: Paramount Pictures
- Release date: June 11, 1917
- Running time: 50 minutes
- Country: United States
- Languages: Silent; English intertitles

The Jaguar's Claws is a 1917 American silent Western film directed by Marshall Neilan and written by William M. McCoy, Beatrice DeMille and Leighton Osmun. The film stars Sessue Hayakawa, Fritzi Brunette, Tom Moore, Marjorie Daw, Tom Forman and Mabel Van Buren. The film was released on June 11, 1917, by Paramount Pictures.

== Cast ==
- Sessue Hayakawa as El Jaguar
- Fritzi Brunette as Beth Thomas
- Tom Moore as Phil Jordan
- Marjorie Daw as Nancy Jordan
- Tom Forman as Harry Knowles
- Mabel Van Buren as Marie
- Horace B. Carpenter
- Lucien Littlefield

== Preservation ==
The Jaguar's Claws is considered a lost film.
