= The Only Road (film) =

1918 film

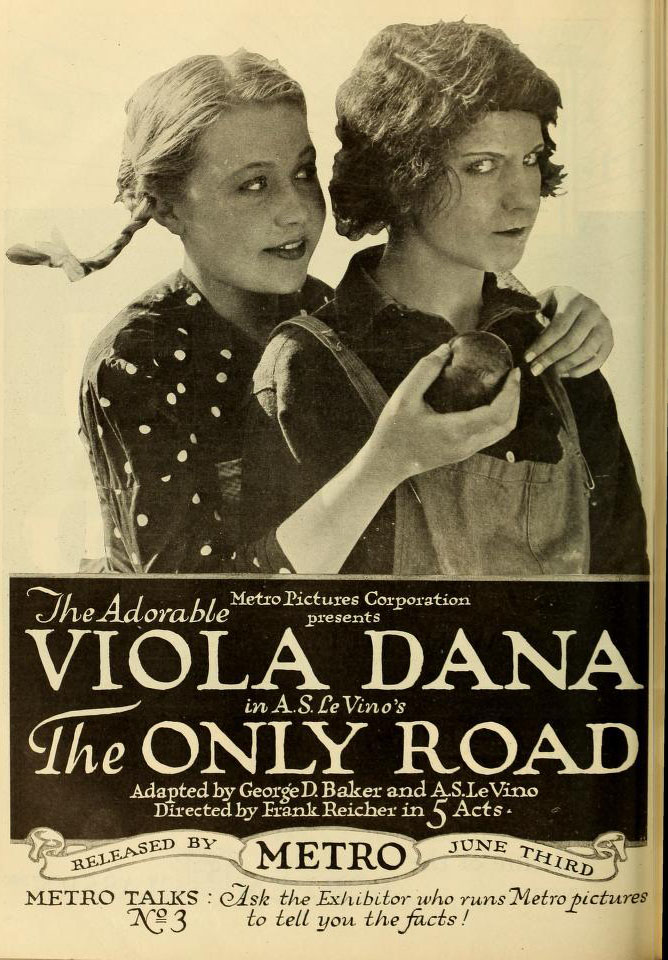
- lobby poster
- Directed by: Frank Reicher
- Written by: Albert Shelby Le Vino; George D. Baker (scenario)
- Starring: Viola Dana
- Cinematography: John Arnold
- Production company: Metro Pictures
- Distributed by: Metro Pictures Corp.
- Release date: June 3, 1918
- Running time: 5 reels
- Country: United States
- Languages: Silent; English intertitles

The Only Road is a 1918 American silent Western film starring Viola Dana. It was produced and distributed by Metro Pictures and directed by Frank Reicher.

This picture is preserved, minus one reel, at the BFI National Film and Television Archive in London.

== Plot ==
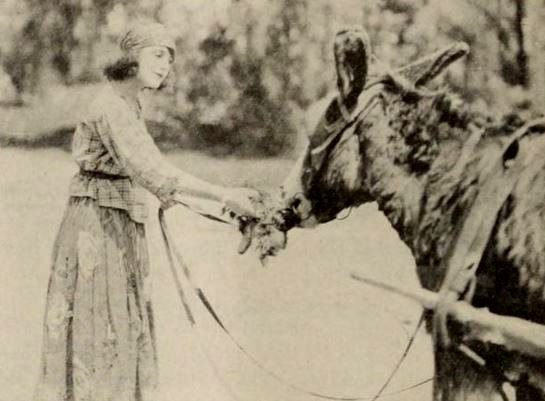
Viola Dana in The Only Road

As described in a film magazine, Nita (Dana), in order to escape marrying Pedro Lupo (Blue), vainly calls for help and Bob Armstrong (Ferguson), who once before had rescued Nita from Pedro, again plays the hero. However, through the father of Pedro, a wrong light is placed upon this brave act such that Bob is forced to marry Nita. As Nita is of poor parentage while Bob is the son of a millionaire sent out west to gain his manhood, the match does not strike Bob as being a choice one, but the point of a pistol has considerable to do with his acquiescing. Nita is placed in a convent but escapes and, in the garb of a boy, seeks employment at the ranch where Bob is living. When found in the arms of her husband, the owner of the ranch, Clara Hawkins (Chapman), unaware of the inside facts, sends Nita away. Later explanations come and Nita turns out to be a child of Hawkins who she thought had died at childbirth. When love enters the heart of Bob, Nita finds happiness.

== Cast ==
- Viola Dana as Nita
- Casson Ferguson as Bob Armstrong
- Edythe Chapman as Clara Hawkins
- Fred Huntley as Ramon Lupo
- Monte Blue as Pedro Lupo
- Paul Weigel as Manuel Lopez
- Marie Van Tassell as Rosa Lopez
- Gertrude Short as Bianca

== Production ==
In early May 1918, the cast was selected and production had wrapped up by the end of the month. Some scenes of The Only Road were shot on location at San Fernando.

== Reception ==
Moving Picture World reviewer Robert C. McElravy gave the film a positive review, saying that the film had an "undeniable charm" and "The plot ingredients are not altogether new, but they have been put together in a very convincing manner."

== Censorship ==
Before The Only Road could be released in Chicago, the Chicago Board of Censors cut, in Reel 4, the binding of a man's hands, all views of putting rope around a man's neck, and all views of a man with a rope around his neck except the scene where the young woman shoots the rope.
