= Miss V from Moscow =

1942 film by Albert Herman

- Directed by: Albert Herman
- Written by: Arthur St. Claire; Sherman L. Lowe
- Produced by: George M. Merrick
- Starring: Lola Lane; Noel Madison; Paul Weigel
- Cinematography: Marcel Le Picard
- Edited by: W.L. Brown
- Music by: Lee Zahler
- Production companies: M & H Productions
- Distributed by: Producers Releasing Corporation
- Release date: November 23, 1942
- Running time: 73 minutes
- Country: United States
- Language: English

Miss V from Moscow is a 1942 American spy thriller film directed by Albert Herman and starring Noel Madison and Paul Weigel.

As with other, better-known American films produced in the midst of World War II like Mission to Moscow and Song of Russia, the film has a pronounced pro-Soviet tone.

== Plot ==
Vera Marova, a Soviet spy known as Miss V, is sent to Paris to impersonate her lookalike, a German spy recently killed by the French Resistance.

== Cast ==
- Lola Lane as Vera Marova
- Noel Madison as Police Chief Kleiss
- Howard Banks as Steve Worth
- Paul Weigel as Henri Devallier
- John Vosper as Colonel Wolfgang Heinrich
- Anna Demetrio as Madame Finchon
- Wilhelm von Brincken as Captain Richter
- Juan de la Cruz as Pierre
- Kathryn Sheldon as Minna
- Victor Kendell as Gerry Naughton
- Richard Kipling as Doctor Suchevcky

== Bibliography ==
- Fetrow, Alan G. Feature Films, 1940-1949: a United States Filmography. McFarland, 1994.
