= Forbidden Paths =

- Directed by: Robert Thornby
- Screenplay by: Beatrice DeMille; Leighton Osmun; Eve Unsell
- Produced by: Jesse L. Lasky
- Starring: Vivian Martin; Sessue Hayakawa; Tom Forman; Carmen Phillips; James Neill; Ernest Joy
- Cinematography: James Van Trees
- Production company: Jesse L. Lasky Feature Play Company
- Distributed by: Paramount Pictures
- Release date: July 12, 1917
- Running time: 50 minutes
- Country: United States
- Language: Silent (English intertitles)

Forbidden Paths is a 1917 American silent drama film directed by Robert Thornby and written by Beatrice DeMille, Leighton Osmun and Eve Unsell. The film stars Vivian Martin, Sessue Hayakawa, Tom Forman, Carmen Phillips, James Neill and Ernest Joy. The film was released on July 12, 1917, by Paramount Pictures. A print of Forbidden Paths exits in the Library of Congress film archive.

== Cast ==
- Vivian Martin as Mildred Thornton
- Sessue Hayakawa as Sato
- Tom Forman as Harry Maxwell
- Carmen Phillips as Benita Ramirez
- James Neill as James Thornton
- Ernest Joy as American ambassador
- Paul Weigel as Luis Valdez
