= Prescription for Romance =

1937 film by S. Sylvan Simon

- Movie poster
- Directed by: S. Sylvan Simon
- Written by: James Mulhauser; Albert R. Perkins; Robert T. Shannon
- Story by: Robert Neville; John Reinhardt
- Starring: Wendy Barrie; Kent Taylor; Frank Jenks
- Cinematography: Milton Krasner
- Edited by: Paul Landres
- Music by: Charles Previn
- Distributed by: Universal Pictures
- Release date: 1937
- Running time: 70 minutes
- Country: United States
- Language: English

Prescription for Romance is a 1937 American romantic comedy film directed by S. Sylvan Simon for Universal Pictures. It stars Wendy Barrie, Kent Taylor, and Frank Jenks.

== Cast ==
- Wendy Barrie as Valarie Barry
- Kent Taylor as Steve Macy
- Frank Jenks as Smitty
- Mischa Auer as Count Sandor
- Gregory Gaye as Dr. Paul Azarny
- Dorothea Kent as Lola Kent
- Henry Hunter as Kenneth Barton
- Samuel S. Hinds as Major Goddard
- Frank Reicher as Jozeph
- Ted Osborne as Corney
- Bert Roach as Police Sergeant
- Christian Rub as Conductor
- George Cleveland as Cab Driver (uncredited)
- Franco Corsaro as Headwaiter Franz (uncredited)
- Joe Cunningham as Farrell (uncredited)
- Sidney D'Albrook as Cab Driver (uncredited)
- Robert Fischer as Veterinary (uncredited)
- Otto Fries as Police Sergeant (uncredited)
- Frederick Giermann as Ambulance Driver (uncredited)
- William Gould as Doorman (uncredited)
- Dorothy Granger as Cashier (uncredited)
- Elsa Janssen as Elsa (uncredited)
- Jimmie Lucas as Waiter (uncredited)
- William Lundigan as Officer (uncredited)
- Michael Mark as Cab Driver (uncredited)
- Greta Meyer as Marie (Head Nurse) (uncredited)
- Torben Meyer as Hotel Desk Clerk (uncredited)
- Constance Moore as Girl (uncredited)
- Paul Newlan as Bearded Hungarian (uncredited)
- Alexander Palasthy as Hungarian Roue (uncredited)
- Ralph Sanford as Hungarian Policeman (uncredited)
- Hugh Sheridan as Feodor (uncredited)
- Paul Weigel as Peasant (uncredited)
- Dick Wessel as Sailor (uncredited)
- Dan Wolheim as Policeman (uncredited)
