= The Devil-Stone =

1917 film

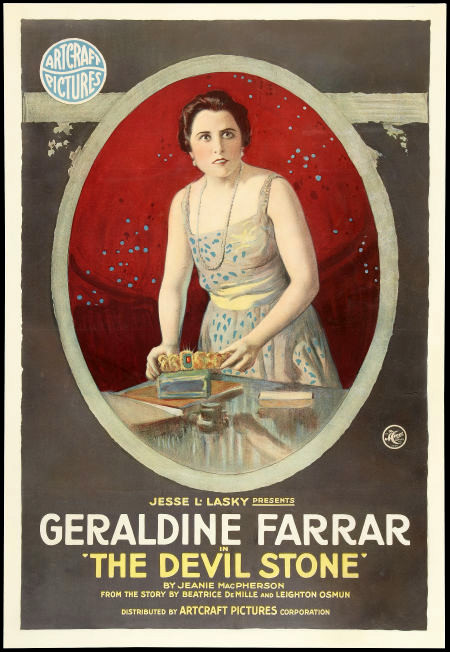
- Lobby poster
- Directed by: Cecil B. DeMille; Cullen Tate (asst. director)
- Written by: Beatrice deMille; Jeanie MacPherson; Leighton Osmun
- Produced by: Jesse L. Lasky; Cecil B. DeMille
- Starring: Geraldine Farrar; Wallace Reid; Hobart Bosworth; Tully Marshall
- Cinematography: Alvin Wyckoff
- Edited by: Cecil B. DeMille
- Production company: Famous Players–Lasky/Artcraft
- Distributed by: Paramount Pictures
- Release date: December 16, 1917
- Running time: 60 minutes
- Country: United States
- Language: Silent (English intertitles)

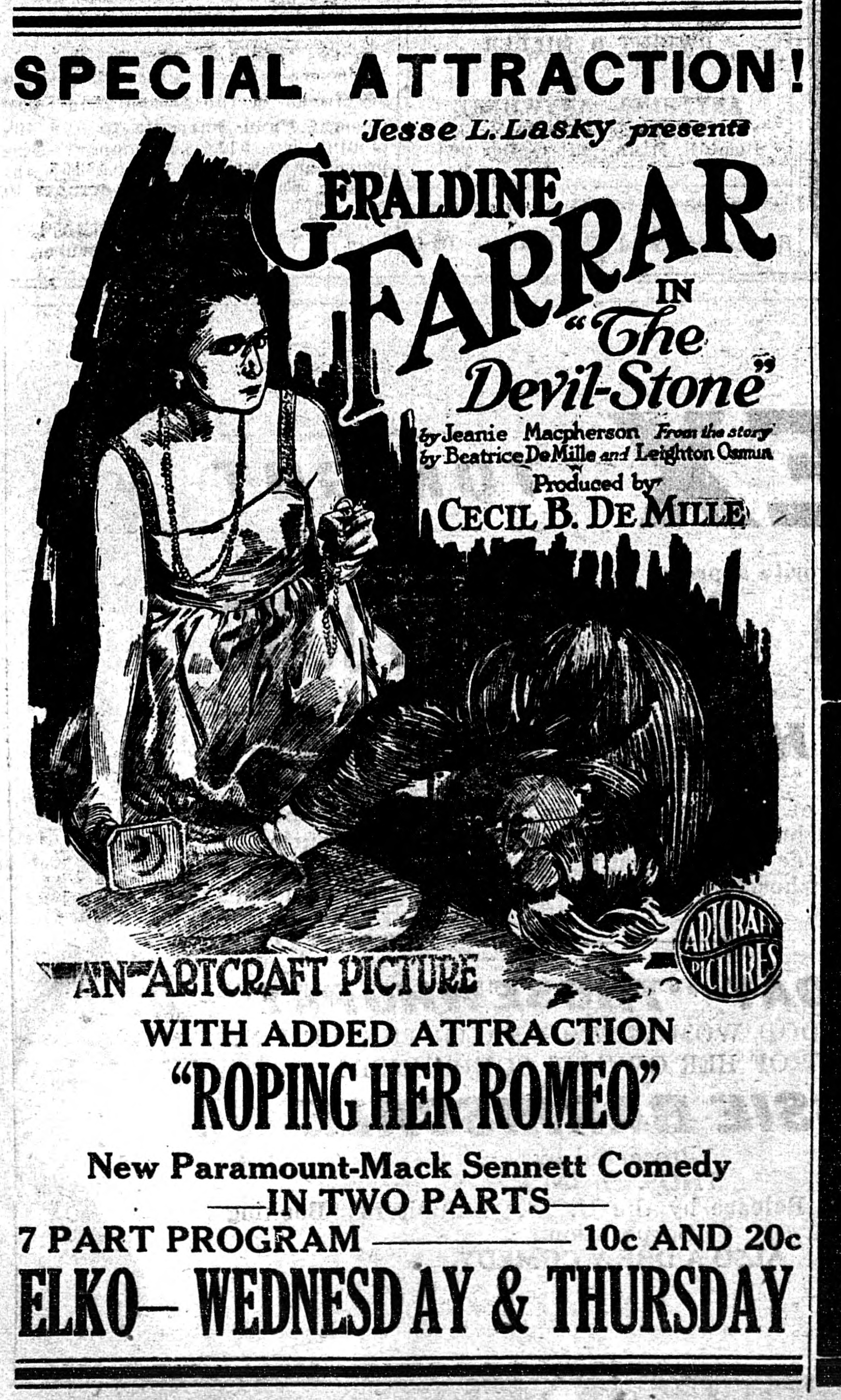
Newspaper advertisement.

The Devil-Stone is a 1917 American silent romance film directed by Cecil B. DeMille, co-written by his mother Beatrice deMille and Jeanie MacPherson, and starring Geraldine Farrar.

The film had sequences filmed in the Handschiegl Color Process (billed as the "DeMille-Wyckoff Process"). Art direction for the film was done by Wilfred Buckland. This was the last of Farrar's films for Paramount Pictures.

== Plot ==
As described in a film magazine, Silas Martin, a miser, marries Marcia Manot in order to gain possession of a valuable emerald she owns that once belonged to a Norse queen and is now cursed. After the wedding Marcia learns the true side of her husband and realizes that the marriage was a mistake. Silas steals the stone and places Marcia and Guy Sterling, his business partner, in a false light in order to get a divorce. Marcia sneaks in one night and discovers that Silas has the stone. She gains possession of it, but Silas attempts to regain it. They struggle, and Marcia kills him in self-defense. Sterling is accused of the murder, but the evidence clears him and the crime remains a mystery. Sterling marries Marcia and has an expert criminologist investigate the murder. He traces the crime to Marcia and, when confronted, she confesses. He gives her one month's leave of absence, after which she is to turn herself into the law. Marcia returns to her old home and gives the priest the emerald so he can make provision for homeless orphans. She returns and gives herself up to the criminologist. However, finding that her good deed has redeemed her, the criminologist does not turn her over to the law, and she and Sterling are happily reunited.

== Cast ==
- Geraldine Farrar as Marcia Manot
- Wallace Reid as Guy Sterling
- Hobart Bosworth as Robert Judson
- Tully Marshall as Silas Martin
- James Neill as Simpson
- Mabel Van Buren
- Lillian Leighton
- Gustav von Seyffertitz as Stephen Densmore
- Horace B. Carpenter
- Ernest Joy
- Burwell Hamrick
- Raymond Hatton
- Theodore Roberts

== Preservation ==
An incomplete 35 mm print of The Devil-Stone is held by the Library of Congress. Only two reels of the film are known to survive, the other four reels are considered lost.

== See also ==
- List of early color feature films
- List of incomplete or partially lost films
