= Jane Wolfe =

American actress

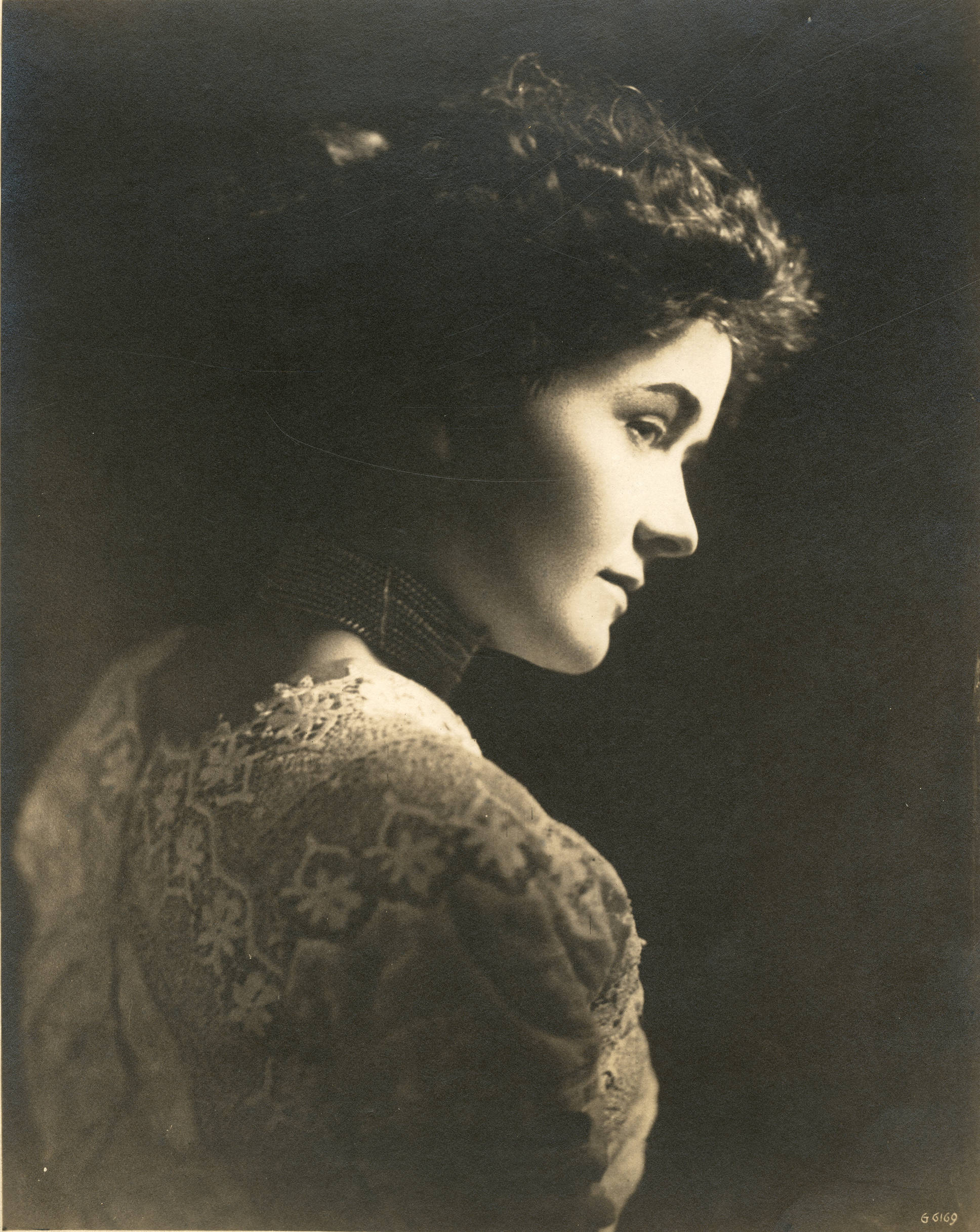
- Born: Sarah Jane Wolfe; March 21, 1875; St. Petersburg, Pennsylvania, US
- Died: March 29, 1958 (aged 83); Glendale, California, US
- Occupations: Actress, teacher
- Years active: 1910–1920

Sarah Jane Wolfe (March 21, 1875 – March 29, 1958) was an American silent film character actress and occultist. Considered an important female figure in Thelema, she was a friend and colleague of Aleister Crowley, a resident of the Abbey of Thelema in Sicily, and a founding member of the Agape Lodge of Ordo Templi Orientis in Southern California.

== Early life ==
Sarah Jane Wolfe was born on March 21, 1875, in St. Petersburg, Pennsylvania, of Pennsylvania Dutch ancestry. Her older brother, John, was born in the previous year, and her sister Mary was born a year and a day after Jane. Their father died in 1876. Wolfe and Mary were closely associated through much of their lives. The children were primarily raised by their grandfather, Bill. When Wolfe was eight years old, the family lived at McKnightstown, Pennsylvania, four miles from Bill's farm.

Aged 19, Wolfe attended Eastman Business College in Poughkeepsie, New York, to prepare for stenographic work.

== Acting and early occult activity ==
Wolfe moved to New York City to pursue a career as a theater actress but soon became involved in the fledgling film industry. She made her film debut in 1910 in The Lad from Old Ireland.

In 1911, Wolfe was part of the Kalem Company's crew in New York City who relocated to the company's new facilities in Hollywood. She went on to become one of the leading character actors of the decade, appearing in more than one hundred films until 1920 (including an important secondary role in the 1917 film Rebecca of Sunnybrook Farm).

In the autumn of 1913, the book Magic, Black and White was given to her to read, leading her to an interest in occult magazines and books.

Wolfe used the Ouija board beginning in 1917, when it first came to her attention. She credited some of her greatest spiritual communications to the use of this implement. In August 1917, when using the ouija board, Wolfe established contact with a spirit who called himself "Bab", and another called "Gan", who gave her definite messages and then departed. After this, spirits who represented themselves as the first two came and gave messages, calling her "the chosen". She later met screenwriter and medium L. V. Jefferson, who introduced her to automatic writing.

== Thelema ==
In October 1918, Wolfe ordered The Equinox, Vol. I, No. 1, and Aleister Crowley's Book 4. In early 1919, Wolfe began writing to Crowley. In 1920, she gave up her acting career and moved to the Abbey of Thelema in Cefalù, Sicily, where she resided with Crowley and several of his followers and devoted herself to Thelema and the discovery of her True Will. Wolfe often expressed her wish to direct a film about magic and Thelema in subsequent years. In Cefalù Wolfe was admitted to the A∴A∴ by Crowley, taking the magical name "Soror Estai". She undertook practices including yoga, Dhāraṇā, and Pranayama, of which she kept a detailed record which was published in 2008 as The Cefalu Diaries. Wolfe stayed at the Abbey until its closure in 1923, and later worked as Crowley's personal representative in London and Paris.

Upon her return to Los Angeles, Wolfe helped to found the Agape Lodge of the Ordo Templi Orientis. On June 6, 1940, Wolfe took Phyllis Seckler as her student.

== Later life ==
After not appearing on screen for seventeen years, in 1937 Wolfe had a small role in a B-movie titled Under Strange Flags. Starting in May 1937 Wolfe taught at an evening theatrical course in Pasadena, California. From 1938, Wolfe served as a chairman of the Cultural Arts Program and Drama Section of the Los Feliz Women's Club and a chairman of the Observers' Club.

Wolfe died on March 29, 1958, in Glendale, California, eight days after her 83rd birthday.

== Partial filmography ==
- A Lad from Old Ireland (1910)
- The Roses Of A Virgin (1910)
- The Boer War (1914)
- The Wild Goose Chase (1915)
- The Majesty of the Law (1915)
- The Case of Becky (1915)
- Blackbirds (1915)
- The Immigrant (1915)
- Pudd'nhead Wilson (1916)
- The Blacklist (1916)
- The Thousand-Dollar Husband (1916)
- The Selfish Woman (1916)
- Each Pearl a Tear (1916)
- The Lash (1916)
- Unprotected (1916)
- The Plow Girl (1916)
- On Record (1917)
- Castles for Two (1917)
- Unconquered (1917)
- The Crystal Gazer (1917)
- On the Level (1917)
- Rebecca of Sunnybrook Farm (1917)
- The Call of the East (1917)
- The Fair Barbarian (1917)
- A Petticoat Pilot (1918)
- Mile-a-Minute Kendall (1918)
- The Bravest Way (1918)
- The Firefly of France (1918)
- Less Than Kin (1918)
- The Cruise of the Make-Believes (1918)
- The Girl Who Came Back (1918)
- Under the Top (1919)
- The Poor Boob (1919)
- The Woman Next Door (1919)
- An Innocent Adventuress (1919)
- Men, Women, and Money (1919)
- A Very Good Young Man (1919)
- The Grim Game (1919)
- The Thirteenth Commandment (1920)
- The Six Best Cellars (1920)
- Why Change Your Wife? (1920)
- Thou Art the Man (1920)
- The Round-Up (1920)
- Behold My Wife! (1920)
- Under Strange Flags (1937)

== See also ==
- Members of Ordo Templi Orientis
