= The Majesty of the Law =

1915 American drama silent film directed by Julia Crawford Ivers

- Directed by: Julia Crawford Ivers
- Screenplay by: Julia Crawford Ivers
- Produced by: Hobart Bosworth
- Starring: George Fawcett; Jane Wolfe; William Desmond; Myrtle Stedman; John Oaker; Charlie Ruggles
- Production company: Hobart Bosworth Productions
- Distributed by: Paramount Pictures
- Release date: August 26, 1915
- Running time: 58 minutes
- Country: United States
- Language: Silent (English intertitles)

The Majesty of the Law is a 1915 American silent drama film written and directed by Julia Crawford Ivers. The film stars George Fawcett (in his film debut), Jane Wolfe, William Desmond, Myrtle Stedman, John Oaker, and Charlie Ruggles. The film was released on August 26, 1915, by Paramount Pictures.

== Cast ==
- George Fawcett as Judge Randolph Kent
- Jane Wolfe as Mrs. Kent
- William Desmond as Jackson Morgan Kent
- Myrtle Stedman as Virginia Fairfax
- John Oaker as Lloyd Fairfax
- Charlie Ruggles as Lawrence Evans
- Herbert Standing as Colonel Monroe

== Preservation ==
- The film survives and is preserved complete in the Library of Congress.
