= The Storm (1916 film) =

1916 lost silent film drama produced by Jesse Lasky

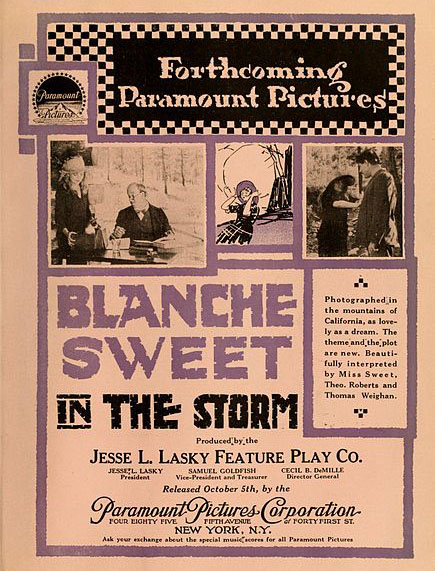
- promotional advertisement.
- Directed by: Frank Reicher
- Written by: Beatrice deMille; Leighton Osmun
- Story by: Beatrice deMille; Leighton Osmun
- Produced by: Jesse Lasky
- Starring: Blanche Sweet; Thomas Meighan
- Cinematography: Dent Gilbert
- Distributed by: Famous Players–Lasky; Paramount Pictures
- Release date: October 5, 1916
- Running time: 50 minutes
- Country: United States
- Language: Silent (English intertitles)

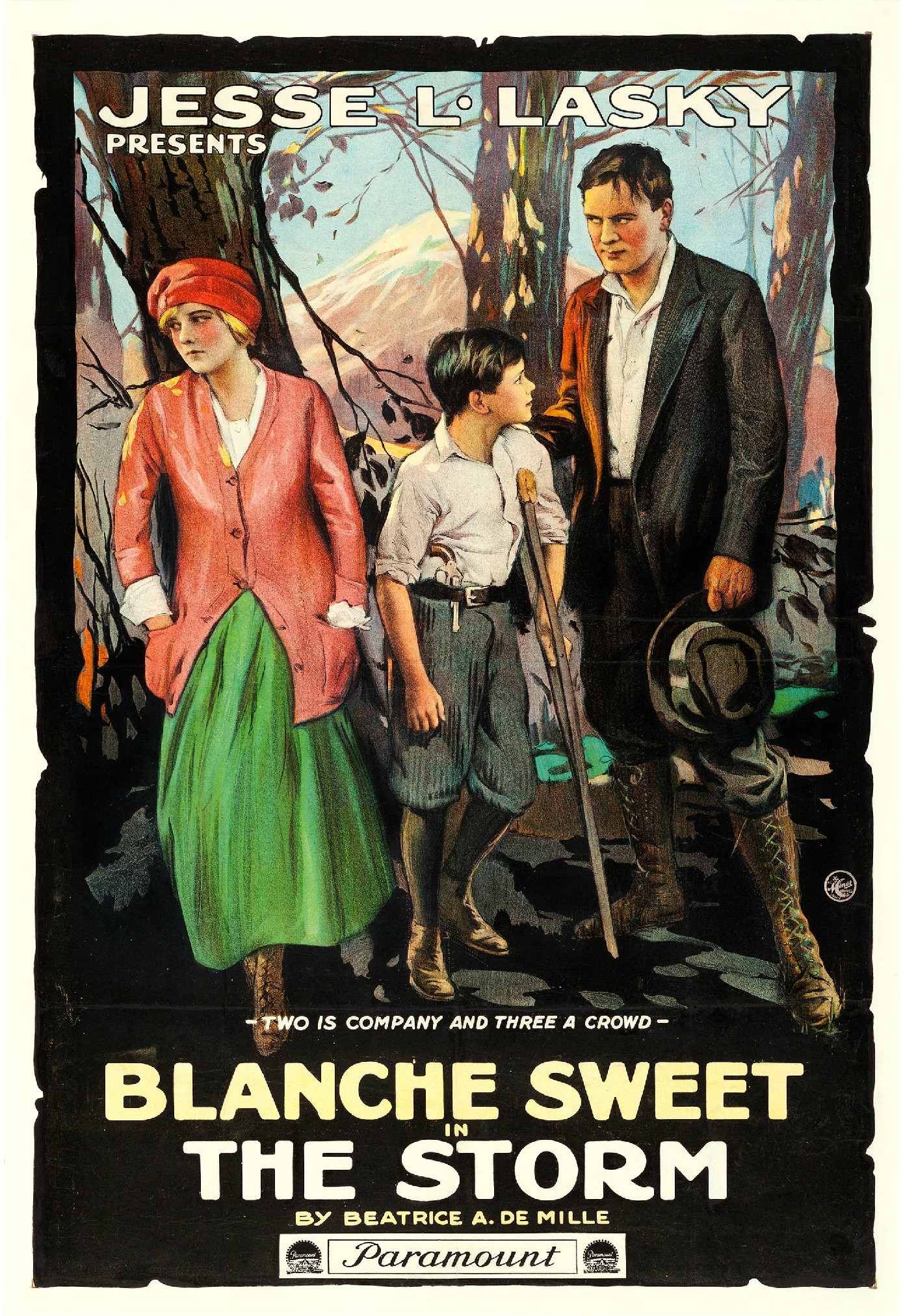
.

The Storm is a 1916 American silent drama film directed by Frank Reicher and starring Blanche Sweet and Thomas Meighan. Beatrice deMille and Leighton Osmun provided the story and scenario for the film. It is not known whether the film currently survives.

== Cast ==
- Blanche Sweet - Natalie Raydon
- Theodore Roberts - Prof. Octavius Raydon
- Thomas Meighan - Robert Fielding
- Richard Sterling - Sheldon Avery
- Chandler House - David
