= The Claim (1918 film) =

1918 film

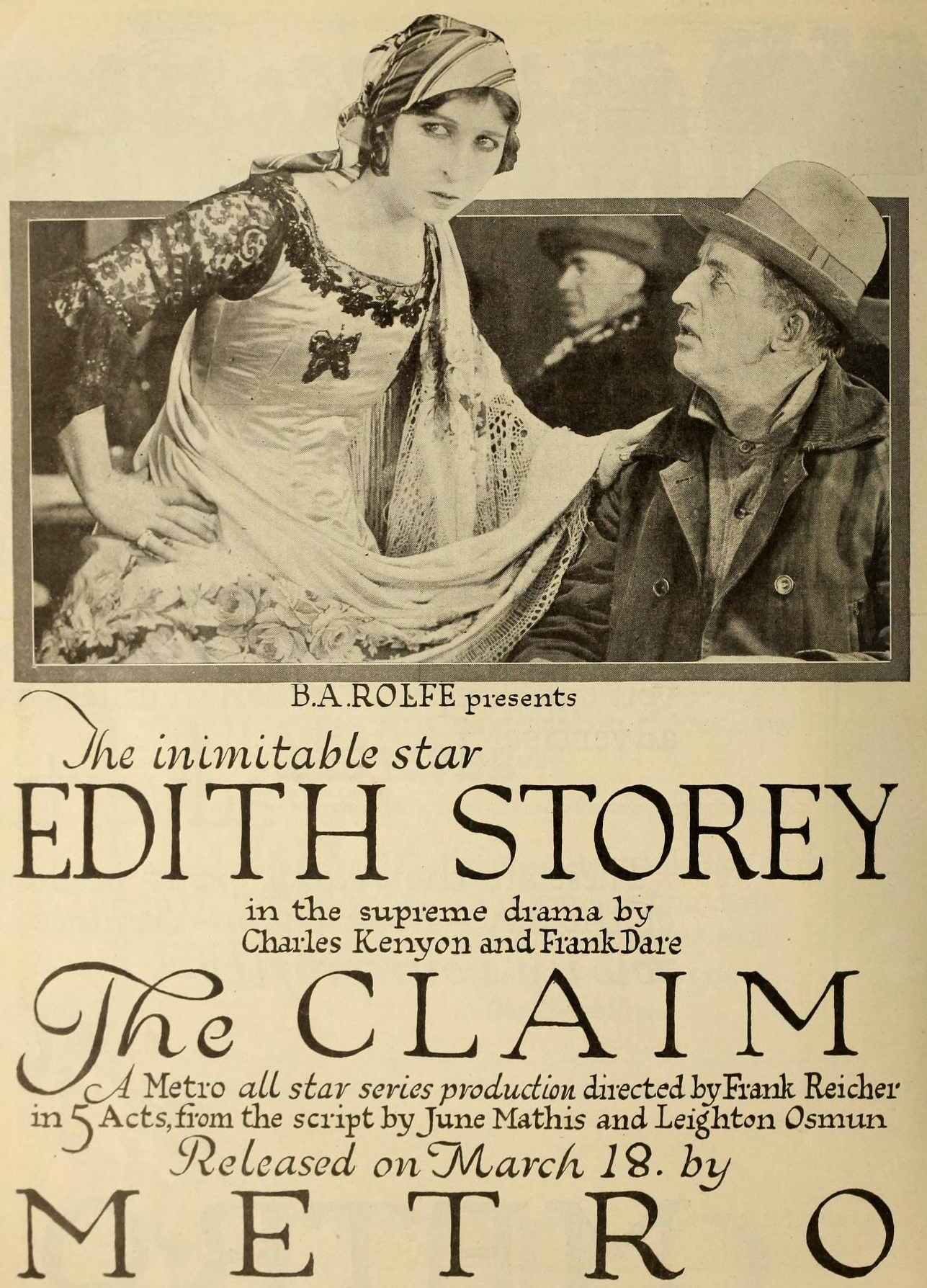
- Advertisement from Motion Picture News
- Directed by: Frank Reicher
- Written by: June Mathis; Leighton Osmun
- Based on: the play, "The Claim" by: Charles Kenyon; Frank Dare
- Produced by: B. A. Rolfe
- Starring: Edith Storey; Wheeler Oakman; Mignon Anderson
- Cinematography: William C. Thompson
- Production company: Metro Pictures
- Release date: March 18, 1918 (U.S.)
- Running time: 5 reels
- Country: United States
- Languages: Silent; English intertitles

The Claim is a 1918 American silent Western film directed by Frank Reicher. It stars Edith Storey, Wheeler Oakman, and Mignon Anderson, and was released on March 18, 1918.

== Cast list ==
- Edith Storey as Belle Jones
- Wheeler Oakman as John MacDonald
- Mignon Anderson as Kate MacDonald
- Marion Skinner as Pansy Bryan
- Paul Weigel as Mike Bryan
- Fred Malatesta as Ted "Blackie" Jerome

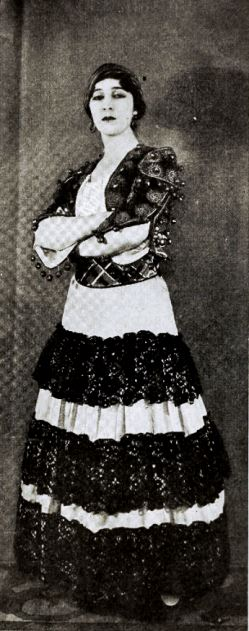
Edith Storey

== Plot ==
Belle Jones is in an unhappy marriage with gambler Blackie Jerome. After the birth of their baby, Blackie abandons them both, heading to a mining camp in El Dorado. To support her and her child, Belle takes up doing laundry. However, she is unable to earn enough to support both of them. She learns of Blackie's whereabouts and heads to El Dorado. Meanwhile, Blackie has been wooing Kate McDonald, the sister of prospector John. He does not tell her that he is married, and promises to marry her. John finds out the truth, and the two men argue, with Blackie eventually falling off a cliff to his death. His body is being brought into town just as Belle arrives with her baby. Distraught over not being able support herself and her child, she abandons her baby, who is adopted by John and Kate.

Belle takes to singing in music halls to support herself. John strikes it rich as a prospector. After some years, she learns of MacDonald becoming wealthy. At the same time, John has seen Belle perform and has become entranced with her. Belle, not knowing that John has seen her perform, sends a letter to him, blackmailing him. But when she arrives, the two recognize one another. When the toddler now calls out for Kate and John, Belle tears up the check John has given her, and the two reconcile, with John proposing to Belle.

== Production ==
Metro Pictures acquired the rights to the play, The Claim, written by Charles Kenyon and Frank Dare in December 1917 as a starring vehicle for Edith Storey. The play had finished a month-long run on Broadway in October, starring Florence Roberts. In early February it was revealed that Frank Reicher would be directing the production. In addition to Storey, other members of the cast were also announced: Mignon Anderson and Fred Malatesta. The film was under production by mid-February, when it was revealed that the cast included, in addition to Storey, Malatesta and Anderson, Wheeler Oakman, Marion Skinner, Paul Weigel. June Mathis and Leighton Osmun had been given the duties to adapt the play into a screenplay, and William C. Thompson was assigned as cinematographer. The film had wrapped production by the beginning of March, and was scheduled for a March 18 opening.

During filming on-location, Storey had a close call with death. While watching a scene between two other actors fighting along a cliff, Storey inadvertently back up to the point where she was in danger of falling to her death. The director noticed she was in danger, but was reticent to call out to her, afraid that she might take that fateful step back, plunging her over the cliff. Instead, thinking quickly he said to her, "Just hold that pose, Miss Storey! Don't move a bit!" He then approached her, and taking her hands, led her away from the precipice. Storey was unaware of the danger she had been in until they arrived back at the studio and it was explained to her.

== Preservation ==
With no holdings located in archives, The Claim is considered a lost film.
