= Castles for Two =

- Directed by: Frank Reicher
- Screenplay by: Matilda Beatrice deMille; Leighton Osmun
- Based on: Rich Girl - Poor Girl by Beatrice C. deMille and Leighton Osmun
- Produced by: Jesse L. Lasky
- Starring: Marie Doro; Elliott Dexter
- Cinematography: Dent Gilbert
- Distributed by: Paramount Pictures
- Release date: March 5, 1917
- Running time: 50 minutes
- Country: United States
- Languages: Silent; English intertitles

Castles for Two is an 1917 American silent drama film directed by Frank Reicher and starring Marie Doro and Elliott Dexter. It is based on an original story for the screen, Rich Girl - Poor Girl, by Beatrice deMille and Leighton Osmun. A copy of the film is preserved at the Library of Congress.

== Plot ==
Heiress Patricia Calhoun visits her ancestral home in Ireland, hoping to discover the fairies of whom her grandmother often spoke. Posing as a poor housemaid, Patricia meets impoverished aristocrat Brian O'Neil, who instantly falls in love with her. However, Brian's three sisters demand that he marry a wealthy American woman in order to save his family's estate. As a practical joke, Patricia leads Brian to believe that her spinster secretary is actually the heiress, and finds enjoyment in observing his awkward attempt at a marriage proposal. Ultimately, Patricia's true identity is revealed and Brian is able to marry the woman he loves.

== Cast ==
- Marie Doro - Patricia Calhoun
- Elliott Dexter - Brian O'Neil
- Mayme Kelso - Patricia's Secretary
- Jane Wolff - Brian's Sister (*Jane Wolfe)
- Harriet Sorenson - Brian's Sister
- Lillian Leighton - Brian's Sister
- Julia Jackson - Brian's Mother
- Horace B. Carpenter - Neough
- Billy Elmer - Callahan
- Marie Mills - The Nanny
