= The Black Wolf (film) =

- Directed by: Frank Reicher
- Written by: Jean Barrymore (short story); Margaret Turnbull (scenario)
- Produced by: Jesse L. Lasky
- Starring: Nell Shipman; Lou Tellegen
- Cinematography: Dent Gilbert
- Distributed by: Paramount Pictures
- Release date: February 12, 1917
- Running time: 5 reels
- Country: USA
- Languages: Silent; English intertitles

The Black Wolf is a 1917 silent film drama produced by Jesse L. Lasky, directed by Frank Reicher, starring Nell Shipman and Lou Tellegen, and distributed through Paramount Pictures.

== Cast ==
- Lou Tellegen - The Black Wolf
- Nell Shipman - Dona Isabel
- H. J. Herbert - Don Phillip
- James Neill - Count Ramirez
- Paul Weigel - Old Luis

== Production ==
Vitagraph Studios loaned Nell Shipman to Famous Players–Lasky for The Black Wolf. Some of the film's scenes were shot on horseback at Rancho Santa Anita.

== Works cited ==
- Armatage, Kay (2003). The Girl from God's Country: Nell Shipman and the Silent Cinema. University of Toronto Press. ISBN 9781442681378.
