= Lillian Leighton =

American actress (1874–1956)

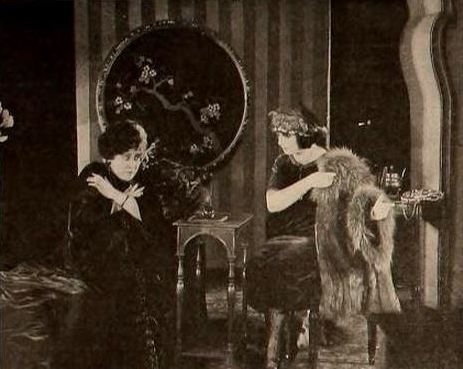
- Leighton (left) with Margarita Fischer in The Thirtieth Piece of Silver, 1920
- Born: Lillianne Leighton Brown; May 17, 1874; Auroraville, Wisconsin, U.S.
- Died: March 19, 1956 (aged 81); Woodland Hills, Los Angeles, California, U.S.
- Other name: Lyllian Leighton
- Occupation: Actress
- Years active: 1910–1940

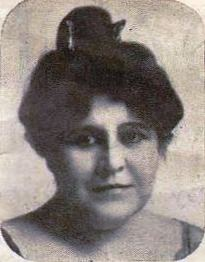
Leighton in December 1915

Lillianne Brown Leighton (May 17, 1874 – March 19, 1956), known professionally as Lillian Leighton, was an American silent film actress. Leighton started her career in Chicago.

Leighton was born in Auroraville, Wisconsin, on May 17, 1874. She was a performer on stage and in vaudeville before she began working in films. She portrayed the Wicked Witch of the West in The Wonderful Wizard of Oz (1910).

She was signed in 1910 and starred in over 200 films before her retirement in 1940. Leighton died in Woodland Hills, Los Angeles, California on March 19, 1956, at the age of 81.

== Selected filmography ==
Year	Title	Role	Notes
1910	The Wonderful Wizard of Oz	Union Enforcer	Undetermined
1911	Brown of Harvard	Mrs. Kenyon	
1913	Truth in the Wilderness		
1916	The Grasp of Greed		
1917	Joan the Woman	Isambeau	
1917	Castles for Two	Brian's Sister	
1917	The Little American	Angela's Great Aunt	Uncredited
1917	The Devil-Stone		
1918	Old Wives for New	Maid	
1918	The Married Virgin	Anne Mullins, the Maid	Alternate title: Frivolous Wives
1918	Till I Come Back to You	Margot	
1919	Poor Relations	Ma Perkins	
1919	A Girl Named Mary	Hannah	
1920	The Dancin' Fool	Ma Budd	
1920	Thou Art the Man	Cook	
1920	The Week-End	Mrs. James Corbin	
1920	The Jack-Knife Man	Widow Potter	
1920	Held by the Enemy	Clarissa	
1921	Midsummer Madness	Caretaker's Wife	
1921	Peck's Bad Boy	Mrs. George W. Peck - Henry's Ma	
1921	Crazy to Marry	Sarah De Morgan	Alternate title: Three Miles Out
1921	Love Never Dies	Mrs. Cavanaugh	
1921	Under the Lash	Tant Anna Vanderberg	Alternate title: The Shulamite
1922	Saturday Night	Mrs. Ferguson	
1923	The Eternal Three	Housekeeper	
1923	Ruggles of Red Gap	Ma Pettengil	
1923	The Call of the Canyon	Mrs. Hutter	
1924	Code of the Sea	Mrs. McDow	
1924	The Mine with the Iron Door		
1925	Go Straight	Gilda's Aunt	
1926	Torrent	Mrs. Ferguson	
1926	Be Your Age	Mrs. Schwartzkopple	
1933	The Man from Monterey	Juanita	
1933	Secret Sinners	Mrs. Simmons	
