= Treasure of the Sea =

1918 US silent film directed by Frank Reicher

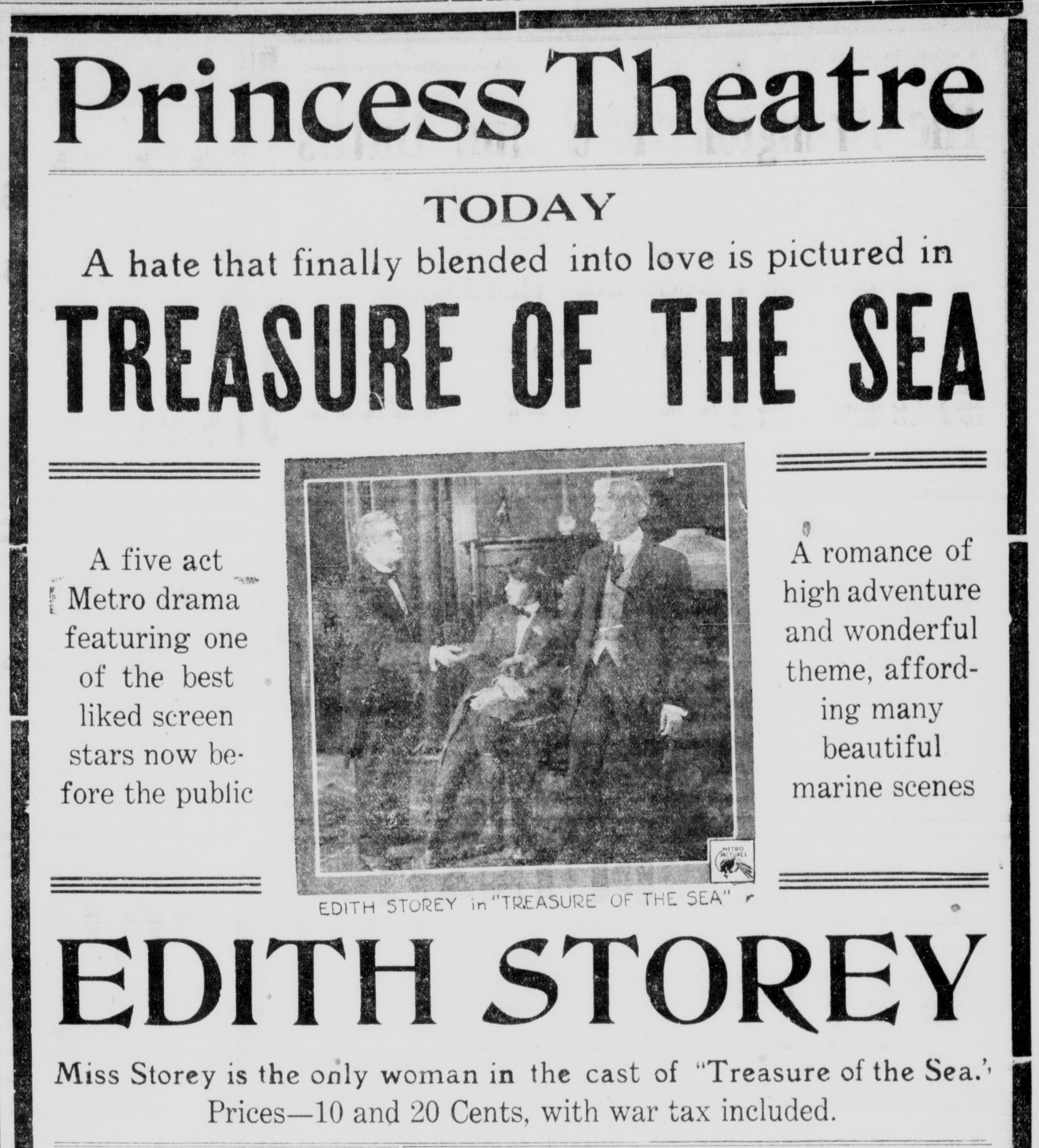
- Contemporary advertisement
- Directed by: Frank Reicher
- Screenplay by: Leighton Osmun; Albert Shelby Le Vino
- Story by: Leighton Osmun
- Starring: Edith Storey; Lew Cody; Lewis Willoughby
- Cinematography: William C. Thompson
- Production company: Metro Pictures
- Release date: April 22, 1918 (US)
- Running time: 5 reels
- Country: United States
- Language: English

Treasure of the Sea is a 1918 American silent drama film directed by Frank Reicher and starring Edith Storey, Lew Cody, and Lewis Willoughby. It was released on April 22, 1918.

== Cast ==
- Edith Storey as Margaret Elkins
- Lew Cody as Jim Hardwick
- Lewis Willoughby as Henry Ames
- Josef Swickard as Thomas Elkins
- William De Vaull as Harris
- Tote Du Crow as Manuel
