= Auroraville, Wisconsin =

- Unincorporated community
- Location within Wisconsin Location within the United States
- Coordinates: 44°03′07″N 88°59′33″W
- Country: United States
- State: Wisconsin
- County: Waushara
- Elevation: 774 ft (236 m)
- Time zone: UTC-6 (Central (CST))
  - Summer (DST): UTC-5 (CDT)
- Area code: 920
- GNIS feature ID: 1561023

Auroraville (also Aurorahville) is an unincorporated community located in the town of Aurora, Waushara County, Wisconsin, United States.
