= Frank Reicher =

German-American actor (1875–1965)

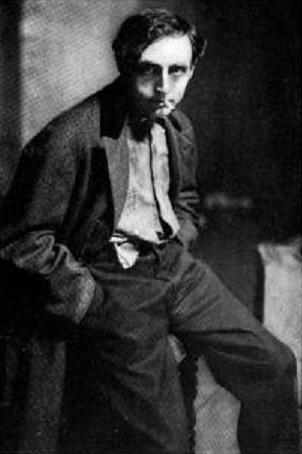
- Reicher as Ferrand in John Galsworthy's; The Pigeon, debut production at the Little Theatre (1912)
- Born: Franz Reichert; December 2, 1875; Munich, Germany
- Died: January 19, 1965 (aged 89); Inglewood, California, U.S.
- Resting place: Inglewood Park Cemetery
- Occupations: Actor; director; producer
- Years active: 1899–1951
- Spouse: Ella Reicher (m. circa 1899–1948; her death)
- Father: Emanuel Reicher
- Relatives: Hedwiga Reicher (half-sister); Ernst Reicher (half-brother)

Frank Reicher (born Franz Reichert; December 2, 1875 – January 19, 1965) was a German-born American actor, director and producer, best known for playing Captain Englehorn in the 1933 monster film classic King Kong.

== Early life ==
Reicher was born in Munich, Germany, the son of actor Emanuel Reichert. Reicher's parents divorced in 1881 and his mother died two years later while at Trieste. His half-sister, Hedwiga Reicher, would also become a Hollywood actor. His half-brother Ernst Reicher was popular as gentleman detective Stuart Webbs in the early German cinema of the 1910s. Frank Reicher immigrated to the States in 1899 and became a naturalized American citizen some twelve years later.

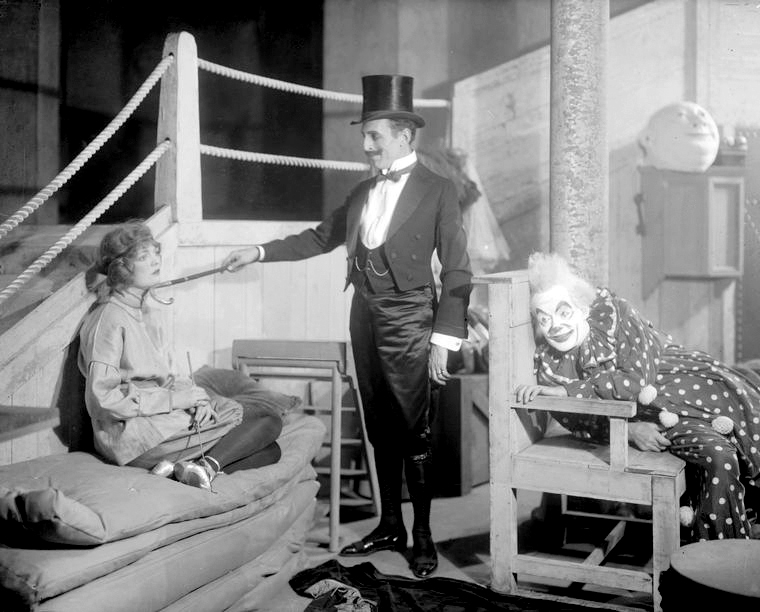
Margalo Gillmore, Frank Reicher and Richard Bennett in the Broadway production of He Who Gets Slapped (1922)

== Career ==
Reicher made his Broadway debut the year he came to America playing Lord Tarquin in Harrison Fiske's production of Becky Sharp, a comedy by Langdon Mitchell based on William Makepeace Thackeray's Vanity Fair. His early career was spent in legitimate theater on and off Broadway. He was head of the Brooklyn Stock Company when Jacob P. Adler performed The Merchant of Venice in Yiddish while the rest of the cast remained in English. Reicher was for a number of years affiliated with the Little Theatre on West Forty-Fourth Street as an actor and manager and would remain active on Broadway as actor, director or producer well into the 1920s. On stage, Reicher starred in such plays as the first Broadway production of Georg Kaiser's From Morning to Midnight (as the cashier), the original production of Percy MacKaye's The Scarecrow (in the title role), and the United States premiere of Leonid Andreyev's He Who Gets Slapped.

Frank Reicher is probably more familiar to modern audiences as a supporting character actor in films. He began his cinema career with an uncredited role in the 1915 film The Case for Becky and would go on to work in over two hundred motion pictures. He is probably best remembered for playing the character of Captain Englehorn in King Kong and The Son of Kong, and for his work in such films as The Secret Life of Walter Mitty (1947) and Kiss Tomorrow Goodbye (1950). His last Hollywood role was in the very first theatrical Superman movie, Superman and the Mole Men, in 1951.

== Marriage ==
Frank Reicher married his wife Ella sometime around 1899 prior to his coming to America. Ella Reicher, a native of Oldenburg, joined him there the following year. The couple remained together until her death in 1948.

== Death ==
Frank Reicher died at a hospital in Inglewood, California, aged 89. He was survived by his sister and a brother. His interment was at Inglewood Park Cemetery.

== Filmography ==
=== Actor ===
- The Case of Becky (1915) as One of Dr. Emerson's Patients (uncredited)
- Wise Husbands (1921)
- Her Man o' War (1926) as Prof. Krantz
- Beau Sabreur (1928) as Gen. de Beaujolais
- Four Sons (1928) as The Schoolmaster
- The Blue Danube (1928) as Baron von Statzen
- The Masks of the Devil (1928) as Count Zellner
- Napoleon's Barber (1928, Short) as Napoleon's Barber
- Someone to Love (1928) as Simmons
- Sins of the Fathers (1928) as The Eye Specialist
- His Captive Woman (1929) as District Attorney
- Strange Cargo (1929) as Dr. Stecker
- Black Waters (1929) as Randall
- Paris Bound (1929) (uncredited)
- Her Private Affair (1929) as State's Attorney
- Mister Antonio (1929) as Milton Jorny
- The Grand Parade (1930)
- Strictly Unconventional (1930) as Duke of Brocklehurst (uncredited)
- Billy the Kid (1930) as General Lew Wallace (uncredited)
- A Lady's Morals (1930) as Italian Theater Manager (uncredited)
- Gentleman's Fate (1931) as Papa Francesco Tomasulo
- Beyond Victory (1931) as German Military Hospital Chief
- The Sin of Madelon Claudet (1931) as Arresting Detective (uncredited)
- Suicide Fleet (1931) as Holtzmann
- Mata Hari (1931) as The Cook / Spy, ordered by Andriani to commit suicide for his past failures
- A Woman Commands (1932) as The General
- The Crooked Circle (1932) as Rankin
- Scarlet Dawn (1932) as Plotsky (uncredited)
- Flesh (1932) as Warden in Germany (uncredited)
- Rasputin and the Empress (1932) as German-Language Teacher (uncredited)
- Employees' Entrance (1933) as Garfinkle
- Topaze (1933) as Dr. Stegg
- King Kong (1933) as Captain Englehorn
- A Bedtime Story (1933) as Aristide
- Jennie Gerhardt (1933) as Old Weaver (uncredited)
- Before Dawn (1933) as Joe Valerie
- Captured! (1933) as Herr Hauptman – the Adjutant
- After Tonight (1933) as Major-Medical Officer (uncredited)
- Ever in My Heart (1933) as Dr. Hoffman (uncredited)
- The Son of Kong (1933) as Captain Englehorn
- Eight Girls in a Boat (1934) as The Examiner (uncredited)
- Hi, Nellie! (1934) as Danny
- Journal of a Crime (1934) as Herr Winterstein
- No Greater Glory (1934) as Doctor
- The Countess of Monte Cristo (1934) as Police Commissioner
- The Line-Up (1934) as Abraham Schultz (uncredited)
- Let's Talk It Over (1934) as Richards
- Little Man, What Now? (1934) as Lehmann
- The World Moves On (1934) as Herr Robess (uncredited)
- Return of the Terror (1934) as Franz Reinhardt
- The Fountain (1934) as Doctor
- British Agent (1934) as Mr. X
- The Case of the Howling Dog (1934) as Dr. Carl Cooper
- I Am a Thief (1934) as Max Bolen
- Secret of the Chateau (1934) as Auctioneer
- Mils of the Gods (1934) as Barrett
- Life Returns (1935) as Dr. James
- The Casino Murder Case (1935) as Assistant Coroner (uncredited)
- Straight from the Heart (1935) as Coroner (uncredited)
- A Dog of Flanders (1935) as Herr Vanderkloot
- The Florentine Dagger (1935) as Von Stein
- Star of Midnight (1935) as Abe Ohlman (uncredited)
- Charlie Chan in Egypt (1935) as Dr. Jaipur
- Born to Gamble (1935) as Defense Attorney (uncredited)
- Rendezvous (1935) as Dr. R.A. Jackson
- Remember Last Night? (1935) as Coroner (uncredited)
- The Man Who Broke the Bank at Monte Carlo (1935) as Second Assistant Director
- The Fighting Marines (1935) as Wheeler – M-70 (uncredited)
- Kind Lady (1935) as Gustave Roubet
- The Great Impersonation (1935) as Doctor Trenk
- Magnificent Obsession (1935) as Dr. Rochard (uncredited)
- The Lone Wolf Returns (1935) as Coleman (scenes deleted)
- The Murder of Dr. Harrigan (1936) as Dr. Coate
- The Invisible Ray (1936) as Professor Meiklejohn (Mendelssohn in end credits)
- The Story of Louis Pasteur (1936) as Dr. Pfeiffer
- Sutter's Gold (1936) as Governor Felipe Vega (uncredited)
- The Country Doctor (1936) as Dr. Paul Luke
- Till We Meet Again (1936) as Colonel Von Diegel
- Murder on a Bridle Path (1936) as Dr. Peters (Gregg's)
- Under Two Flags (1936) as French General
- The Ex-Mrs. Bradford (1936) as Henry Strand – Summers' Lawyer (uncredited)
- Nobody's Fool' (1936) as Chairman (uncredited)
- The Devil-Doll (1936) as Doctor (uncredited)
- Anthony Adverse (1936) as Coach Driver to Paris
- Girls' Dormitory (1936) as Dr. Hoffenreich
- Second Wife (1936) as Headmaster
- Star for a Night' (1936) as Doctor Heimkin
- The Gorgeous Hussy (1936) as Commander of U.S.S. Constitution (uncredited)
- Old Hutch (1936) as District Attorney (uncredited)
- Along Came Love (1936) as Planetarium Lecturer
- Laughing at Trouble (1936) as Dr. Larson
- Camille (1936) as Creditor Agent (uncredited)
- Sinner Take All (1936) as Theo Drukker (uncredited)
- Under Cover of Night (1937) as Rudolph Brehmer
- The Mighty Treve (1937) as Eben McClelland
- Man of the People (1937) as Professor Robinson – Geologist (uncredited)
- Stolen Holiday (1937) as Rainer
- The Great O'Malley (1937) as Dr. Larson
- Espionage (1937) as Von Cram
- Night Key (1937) as Carl
- King of Gamblers' (1937) as Herman (uncredited)
- The Road Back (1937) as Ernst's Father
- The Devil Is Driving (1937) as District Attorney (uncredited)
- The Emperor's Candlesticks (1937) as Pavloff
- Midnight Madonna (1937) as Vincent Long II
- West Bound Limited (1937) as Pop Martin
- The Life of Emile Zola (1937) as M. Perrenx (uncredited)
- On Such a Night (1937) as Horace Darwin
- Fit for a King (1937) as Kurtz
- Stage Door (1937) as Stage Director
- Lancer Spy (1937) as Admiral
- Heidi (1937) as Police Lieutenant (uncredited)
- 45 Fathers (1937) as Prentiss (uncredited)
- Beg, Borrow or Steal (1937) as Monsieur Debillon (uncredited)
- Prescription for Romance (1937) as Jozeph
- Prison Nurse (1938) as Doctor Hartman
- Rascals (1938) as Dr. C.M. Garvey
- Three Comrades (1938) as Major – Young Soldier's Father (uncredited)
- City Streets (1938) as Dr. Ferenc Waller
- The Amazing Dr. Clitterhouse (1938) as Professor O.J. Ludwig (uncredited)
- I'll Give a Million (1938) as Prefect of Police
- Letter of Introduction' (1938) as 2nd Doctor – Midtown Hospital (uncredited)
- Suez (1938) as General Changarnier
- The Storm (1938) as Officer (uncredited)
- Torchy Gets Her Man (1938) as The Professor
- The Girl Downstairs (1938) as Police Sergeant (uncredited)
- Devil's Island (1939) as President of Assize Court
- Woman Doctor (1939) as Dr. Mathews
- Society Smugglers (1939) as Jones
- Mystery of the White Room (1939) as Dr. Amos Thornton
- Never Say Die (1939) as Man in Charge of Duel (uncredited)
- Juarez (1939) as Duc de Morny (uncredited)
- Unexpected Father (1939) as Adoption Hearing Referee (uncredited)
- The Magnificent Fraud (1939) as Mendietta Garcia
- Nurse Edith Cavell (1939) as Baron Von Bissing
- Rio (1939) as Paris Banker (uncredited)
- The Escape (1939) as Dr. Shumaker
- Sabotage (1939) as George Wallner—Head of Saboteurs (uncredited)
- Ninotchka (1939) as Soviet Lawyer (uncredited)
- Our Neighbors – The Carters (1939) as Dr. Proser
- South of the Border (1939) as Don Diego Mendoza
- Everything Happens at Night (1939) as Pharmacist
- Dr. Ehrlich's Magic Bullet (1940) as Old Man (uncredited)
- Dr. Cyclops (1940) as Professor Kendall
- Typhoon (1940) as Doctor
- All This, and Heaven Too (1940) as Police Official (uncredited)
- The Lady in Question (1940) as President
- South to Karanga (1940) as Dr. Greenleaf
- The Man I Married (1940) as Friehof
- Sky Murder (1940) as Dr. Crattan
- Four Mothers (1941) as Festival Committee Member (uncredited)
- The Face Behind the Mask (1941) as Dr. Ronald Cheever (uncredited)
- Flight from Destiny (1941) as Edvaard Kreindling
- They Dare Not Love (1941) as German Captain (uncredited)
- The Nurse's Secret (1941) as Mr. Henderson
- Shining Victory (1941) as Dr. Esterhazy
- Underground (1941) as Professor Baumer
- Father Takes a Wife (1941) as Captain of the 'SS Leslie C.' (uncredited)
- One Foot in Heaven (1941) as Board Member (uncredited)
- Dangerously They Live (1941) as Jarvis
- Nazi Agent (1942) as Fritz
- To Be or Not to Be (1942) as Polish Official (uncredited)
- The Mystery of Marie Roget (1942) as Magistrate
- Beyond the Blue Horizon (1942) as Sneath
- I Married an Angel (1942) as Driver (uncredited)
- The Gay Sisters (1942) as Dr. Thomas Bigelow
- Secret Enemies (1942) as Henry Bremmer
- Night Monster (1942) as Dr. Timmons
- The Mummy's Tomb (1942) as Professor Matthew Norman
- Scattergood Survives a Murder (1942) as Thaddeus Quentin
- The Purple V (1943) as Bit Role (uncredited)
- Hangmen Also Die! (1943) as Interpreter (uncredited)
- Mission to Moscow (1943) as General von Koestrich – German ambassador (uncredited)
- Above Suspicion (1943) as Colonel Gerold (uncredited)
- Yanks Ahoy (1943) as German (uncredited)
- Background to Danger (1943) as Rudick – the Assassin (uncredited)
- Bomber's Moon (1943) as Dr. Hartman
- Watch on the Rhine (1943) as Admiral (uncredited)
- The Song of Bernadette (1943) as Dr. St. Cyr (uncredited)
- Tornado (1943) as Old Man Linden (uncredited)
- Captain America (1944, Serial) as Lyman [Ch. 1]
- In Our Time (1944) as Baron Jarski (uncredited)
- Address Unknown (1944) as Professor Schmidt
- The Hitler Gang (1944) as The Justizminister (uncredited)
- The Adventures of Mark Twain (1944) as Doctor in Elmira (uncredited)
- Gildersleeve's Ghost (1944) as Dr. John Wells
- The Mummy's Ghost (1944) as Professor Matthew Norman
- The Conspirators (1944) as Casino Attendant (uncredited)
- House of Frankenstein (1944) as Ullman
- The Big Bonanza (1944) as Dr. Ballou
- The Jade Mask (1945) as Harper
- Hotel Berlin (1945) as Fritz (uncredited)
- A Medal for Benny (1945) as Father Bly (uncredited)
- Blonde Ransom (1945) as Judge
- Rhapsody in Blue (1945) as Guest (uncredited)
- Voice of the Whistler (1945) as Dr. Rose (uncredited)
- The Tiger Woman (1945) as Coroner
- The Strange Mr. Gregory (1945) as Riker, the Butler
- A Guy Could Change (1946) as Doctor (uncredited)
- The Shadow Returns (1946) as Michael Hasdon
- Song of Arizona (1946) as Doctor (uncredited)
- My Pal Trigger (1946) as Judge J.E. Ellis (uncredited)
- Sister Kenny (1946) as Dr. Chuter (uncredited)
- Home in Oklahoma (1946) as Jason Cragmyle
- Mr. District Attorney (1947) as Peter Lantz (uncredited)
- Yankee Fakir (1947) as Banker H.W. Randall
- Monsieur Verdoux (1947) as Doctor (uncredited)
- Violence (1947) as Pop
- The Secret Life of Walter Mitty (1947) as Karl Maasdam
- Song of Love (1947) as Mr. Fuerbach (uncredited)
- Escape Me Never (1947) as The Minister
- Joe Palooka in Fighting Mad (1948) as Dr. MacKenzie
- Carson City Raiders (1948) as Razor the Barber
- I, Jane Doe (1948) as Doctor (uncredited)
- The Gallant Blade (1948) as Major (uncredited)
- Barbary Pirate (1949) as Cathcart
- Samson and Delilah (1949) as Village Barber
- The Arizona Cowboy (1950) as Major Sheridan
- Cargo to Capetown (1950) as Judge Van Meeger (uncredited)
- Kiss Tomorrow Goodbye (1950) as 'Doc' Darius Green
- The Lady and the Bandit (1951) as Count Eckhardt
- Superman and the Mole Men (1951) as Hospital Superintendent (final film role)

=== Director ===
| Year | Title | Studio | Notes |
|---|---|---|---|
| 1915 | The Clue | Jesse L. Lasky Feature Play Co. | First credit as a director. The first of 8 films made with Blanche Sweet. |
| 1915 | The Secret Orchard | Jesse L. Lasky Feature Play Co. | First solo credit as a director |
| 1915 | The Case of Becky | Jesse L. Lasky Feature Play Co. | |
| 1915 | The Chorus Lady | Jesse L. Lasky Feature Play Co. | |
| 1915 | The Secret Sin | Jesse L. Lasky Feature Play Co. | |
| 1915 | Mr. Grex of Monte Carlo | Jesse L. Lasky Feature Play Co. | |
| 1916 | Pudd'nhead Wilson | Jesse L. Lasky Feature Play Co. | |
| 1916 | For the Defense | Jesse L. Lasky Feature Play Co. | |
| 1916 | The Sowers | Jesse L. Lasky Feature Play Co. | |
| 1916 | The Love Mask | Jesse L. Lasky Feature Play Co. | |
| 1916 | Alien Souls | Jesse L. Lasky Feature Play Co. | |
| 1916 | The Dupe | Jesse L. Lasky Feature Play Co. | |
| 1916 | Public Opinion | Jesse L. Lasky Feature Play Co. | |
| 1916 | The Victory of Conscience | Jesse L. Lasky Feature Play Co. | |
| 1916 | The Storm | Jesse L. Lasky Feature Play Co. | |
| 1916 | Witchcraft | Jesse L. Lasky Feature Play Co. | |
| 1917 | Betty to the Rescue | Jesse L. Lasky Feature Play Co. | |
| 1917 | Lost and Won | Jesse L. Lasky Feature Play Co. | |
| 1917 | The Black Wolf | Jesse L. Lasky Feature Play Co. | |
| 1917 | Castles for Two | Jesse L. Lasky Feature Play Co. | |
| 1917 | Sacrifice | Jesse L. Lasky Feature Play Co. | |
| 1917 | Unconquered | Jesse L. Lasky Feature Play Co. | |
| 1917 | The Inner Shrine | Jesse L. Lasky Feature Play Co. | |
| 1917 | The Trouble Buster | Pallas Pictures | |
| 1917 | The Eternal Mother | Metro Pictures | |
| 1917 | An American Widow | Metro Pictures | |
| 1918 | The Claim | Metro Pictures | |
| 1918 | Treasure of the Sea | Metro Pictures | |
| 1918 | The Only Road | Metro Pictures | |
| 1918 | The Sea Waif | World Film | |
| 1918 | The Prodigal Wife | Screencraft | |
| 1919 | Suspense | Screencraft | |
| 1919 | The American Way | World Film | |
| 1919 | The Trap | Universal Pictures | |
| 1919 | The Battler | World Film | |
| 1919 | The Black Circle | World Film | |
| 1920 | Empty Arms | Park-Whiteside Productions | |
| 1921 | Idle Hands | Park-Whiteside Productions | |
| 1921 | Behind Masks | Famous Players-Lasky | |
| 1921 | Wise Husbands | Pioneer Film Corp. | |
| 1921 | Out of the Depths | Art-O-Graf | Unconfirmed |
| 1929 | Mister Antonio | Tiffany-Stahl Productions | Co-directed with James Flood |
| 1931 | Wir schalten um auf Hollywood | MGM | Final director credit |
