= The Inner Shrine =

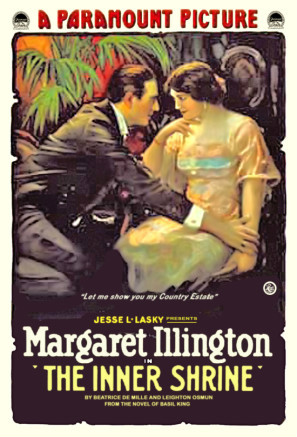
- Theater poster
- Directed by: Frank Reicher; Charles Watt (assistant)
- Written by: Basil King (novel); Beatrice DeMille; Leighton Osmun
- Produced by: Jesse Lasky
- Starring: Margaret Illington
- Cinematography: Dent Gilbert
- Distributed by: Paramount Pictures
- Release date: June 14, 1917
- Running time: 5 reels
- Country: United States
- Language: Silent(English intertitles)

The Inner Shrine is a 1917 American silent drama film produced by Jesse Lasky and distributed by Paramount Pictures. It is the first of only two films that starred Margaret Illington, a noted Broadway actress. The story is from a 1909 novel, The Inner Shrine, by Basil King, an author popular with actresses. The film is now lost.

== Plot ==
According to a film magazine, "Diane Winthrop, a wealthy young American girl, is the ward of Derek Pruyn, an explorer and a student. Derek is in love with Diane, but believes that he is too old to ask her to marry him.

The Viscount D'Arcourt is visiting at a Maine summer resort where Diane is spending the summer at the home of Derek and his sister. The Viscount proposes and is accepted just as Derek has nerved himself to propose to Diane. A hasty marriage ceremony is performed and the Viscount and Diane go to live in Paris, where the Viscount proceeds to take up his former life of debauchery, and his wife, to get even with him, begins a flirtation with the Marquis de Bienville.

The latter takes the flirtation seriously and when he finds out that Diane means nothing by it, he seriously compromises her. He and the Viscount have a duel, and the Viscount, at the end of Iris resources, instead of shooting at the Marquis, commits suicide. The Marquis flees to South America and aids in the rescue of Derek, who after Diane's wedding has gone to explore the upper Amazon.

Diane returns to America and Derek brings the Marquis, his rescuer, home with him. The three meet, explanations are demanded, and Diane finally appreciates Derek's wonderful love for her and they are happy together."

== Cast ==
- Margaret Illington – Diane Winthrop
- Hobart Bosworth – Derek Pruyn
- Jack Holt – Viscount D'Arcourt
- Elliott Dexter – Marquis de Bienville
- Madame I. D'Juria – Madame D'Arcourt

== Censorship ==
Before The Inner Shrine could be exhibited in Kansas, the Kansas Board of Review required the elimination of scenes where women are smoking, love scenes between husband and Luzette, and the intertitle "The toast to the fair American,"
