= Beatrice deMille =

English-American play broker, screenwriter, playwright, theater actress and entrepreneur

Matilda Beatrice deMille
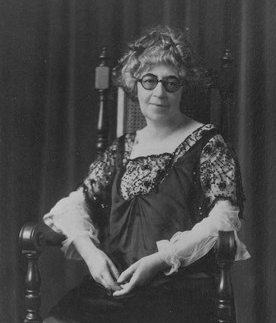
- Born: Matilda Beatrice Samuel; January 30, 1853; Liverpool, England, UK
- Died: October 8, 1923 (aged 70); Hollywood, California, US
- Occupation(s): Playwright, entrepreneur
- Spouse: Henry deMille (m. 1876; died 1893)
- Children: 3, including William C. deMille and Cecil B. DeMille
- Relatives: Grandchildren: Agnes de Mille; Peggy George; Katherine DeMille; Richard de Mille

Matilda Beatrice deMille (January 30, 1853 – October 8, 1923) (born Matilda Beatrice Samuel; also known as Beatrice C. deMille, Agnes Graham, Tillie Samuel, Mrs. Henry deMille) was an English-American play broker, screenwriter, playwright, theater actress and entrepreneur. She had a part in founding Paramount Pictures. Her sons were pioneering filmmakers Cecil B. DeMille and William C. deMille.

== Life ==
deMille was born in Liverpool, England to German Jewish parents. She emigrated to New York with her family in 1871. She was married to Henry deMille, an aspiring actor in Brooklyn, New York, in 1876. He was a Christian so she had to marry without her family's approval.

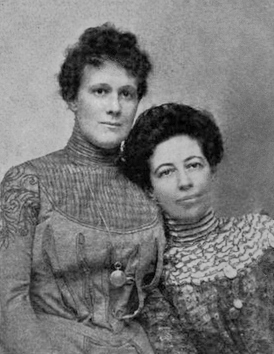
Harriet Ford and Beatrice deMille, from a 1900 publication

Together, Beatrice deMille and Henry deMille worked primarily as teachers in a preparatory school. She taught elocution whilst her husband taught the children how to compose. However, during their vacation time they were able to work as traveling actors in numerous theatrical productions. (Note: Numerous archives found are found in the DeMille collection at Brigham Young University.) Henry became successful as a playwright and actor and the family thrived.

In 1893, Henry died and deMille had to create an income. She converted her house in Pompton, New Jersey into the Henry C. deMille Preparatory School for Girls. She was able to trade a free class at that school with the President of a boys' school to get Cecil educated and William was sent to a school in Germany. At the same time she negotiated with her late husband's co-author to be the agent for their plays. This worked out and her success led to her representing the work of other writers.

In 1900, Beatrice deMille collaborated with Harriet Ford to write her first published play "The Greatest Thing in The World" – directed by Liebler & Company, and performed on Broadway and in Washington DC. In 1907 the Henry C. deMille Preparatory School for Girls lost its students after it was identified as one of the schools that the scandalous Evelyn Nesbit had attended and the school as "guilty by association". Beatrice recovered rapidly by taking on even more writers including her sons. Cecil B de Mille credits his mother with teaching him to write and direct.

Beatrice was a deal maker and she introduced her son to Jesse Lasky and his production grew to be Paramount Pictures. The company would produce her son's silent epics. She moved to California in 1914 and she is credited with launching the careers of actor Victor Moore who appeared in her son's films and screenwriter Beulah Marie Dix. Over the next few years she wrote a fair number of screen plays which were made into silent films. She stopped writing in 1920 and enjoyed her and her son's wealth.

== Legacy and family ==
She had three children; her first son William C. deMille followed by Cecil B. DeMille in 1881 and daughter, Agnes Beatrice in 1891 who died four years later of spinal meningitis.

Matilda Beatrice deMille died on October 8, 1923 in Hollywood, California.

== Plays ==
- The Greatest Thing in the World (co-written)

== Filmography ==
Year	Title	Description
1917	The Devil-Stone	Story
1917	Forbidden Paths	Scenario – as Beatrice C. deMille
1917	The Inner Shrine	Scenario – as Beatrice deMille
1917	The Jaguar's Claws	Scenario
1917	Unconquered	Story – as Beatrice C. de Mille
1917	Sacrifice	Scenario
1917	Castles for Two	Screenplay – as Beatrice C. deMille) / (story "Rich Girl – Poor Girl" – as Beatrice C. deMille)
1917	Betty to the Rescue	Writer
1916	The Years of the Locust	Scenario
1916	The Heir to the Hoorah	Scenario – as Beatrice C. deMille
1916	The Storm	Play
1916	Each Pearl a Tear	Scenario – as Beatrice C. deMille
