= Florence Dagmar =

American silent film actress

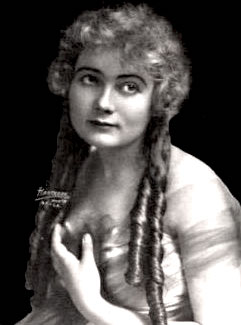
- Dagmar in 1918
- Born: Florence Dagmar Oberg; October 22, 1895; Portland, Oregon, U.S.
- Died: May 7, 1986 (aged 90); Sacramento, California, U.S.
- Occupation: Actress
- Spouse: Roy Somers (m. 1917)

Florence Dagmar Oberg (October 22, 1895 – May 7, 1986) was an American silent film actress. She had several leading roles and worked for the Famous Players–Lasky film company, appearing at least twice with Thomas Meighan and Victor Moore while being directed by Cecil B. DeMille.

Born to Swedish parents in Oregon, Dagmar was a stage actress in the Pacific Northwest before relocating with her family to Los Angeles and pursuing a film career. She began her film career in 1914, appearing in several features including DeMille's The Man from Home. She subsequently appeared in DeMille's Kindling (1915). Other credits include the drama Blackbirds, the Western Chimmie Fadden Out West, and The Clown.

== Biography ==
Dagmar was born in Portland, Oregon in 1895. Both her parents were immigrants from Sweden. (Note: Census records show that Dagmar (born Florence Dagmar Oberg), residing in Los Angeles in 1900, age 5, was the daughter of Anna and David Oberg, natives of Sweden.) She was active in stock theater in San Francisco, Seattle and Spokane, Washington, prior to becoming a film actress, often appearing in ingenue roles. As a child, she relocated to Los Angeles with her parents, and embarked on a career in films. In Los Angeles, Dagmar became affiliated with Constance Crawley and film director Arthur Maude.

After appearing in films for Phillips Smalley, Dagmar was noticed by Cecil B. DeMille, who offered her a film contract with the Players Lasky, which she accepted. Her first appearance for DeMille was in The Call of the North (1914). In 1917, Dagmar married Roy Somers, a fellow actor in the Players Lasky. Her role in 1915's Young Romance was praised by The Owensboro Messenger, who noted that she "raises her "bit" to a place among the principals."

== Death ==
Dagmar died in Sacramento, California on May 7, 1986.

== Filmography ==
Key
†	Denotes a lost or presumed lost film

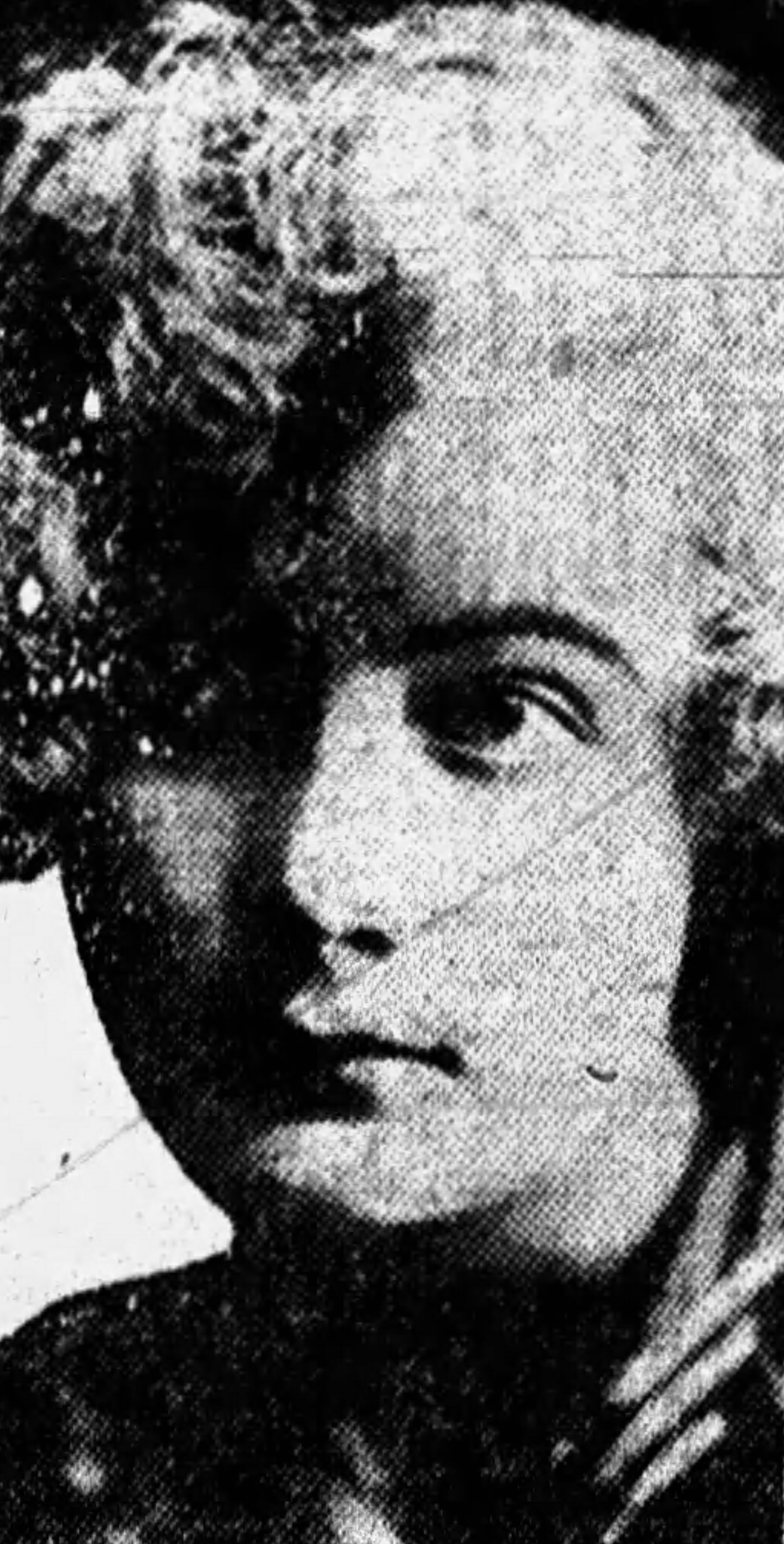
Dagmar in The Clown (1916)

Year	Title	Role	Notes	Ref.
1914	The Man from Home	Elodie		
1914	Ready Money	Ida Tyler		
1914	The Circus Man	Christine Braddock		
1915	Young Romance	Lou		
1915	The Country Boy	Jane Belknap		
1915	A Gentlemen of Leisure	Kate		
1915	Snobs			
1915	Kindling	Alice Burke-Smith		
1915	Blackbirds	Miss Crocker		
1915	Chimmie Fadden Out West	Betty Van Courtlandt		
1916	Pudd'nhead Wilson †	Rowena Cooper		
1916	The Clown †	Millicent, His Daughter		
