= This Heart of Mine =

Song by Henry Warren, Arthur Freed
- Published: Triangle Music Corporation
- Released: 1946
- Composer: Harry Warren
- Lyricist: Arthur Freed

"This Heart of Mine" is a 1944 song written by composer Harry Warren and lyricist Arthur Freed, and featured in the musical score of the film, Ziegfeld Follies. The song is introduced by Fred Astaire, who dances with Lucille Bremer in a lavish and romantic dance sequence. In the same film, Esther Williams performs a water ballet to a softer, instrumental version of the song.

== The dance sequence ==
Astaire plays a con artist hoping to steal some jewelry. Although he is already dancing with a lady, he soon eyes Lucille Bremer and cuts in to dance with her. They dance out to the terrace, where they dance among stairs and moving walkways. It concludes with the end of the ball and Astaire stealing Lucille's bracelet while kissing her. She then willingly gives him her necklace. They separate and Astaire ponders if he'd allowed his chance for real love to get away. He looks back and she runs into his arms.

It was the second of four features for Fred Astaire in Ziegfeld Follies.

== Other recordings ==
- 1944: Fred Astaire - a single release recorded for Decca Records on December 13, 1944 (catalog No. 23388).
- 1945: Maxine Sullivan - recorded on January 15, 1945, with the Teddy Wilson Quintet for Musicraft Records (catalog No. 317).
- 1945: Judy Garland - recorded on January 26, 1945, for Decca Records (catalog No. 18660A). It reached No. 22 on a Billboard chart.
