= Pudd'nhead Wilson =

1894 American novel by Mark Twain

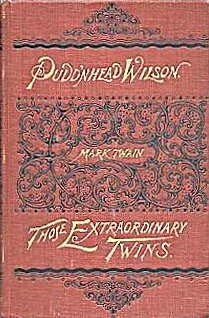
- First edition
- Author: Mark Twain
- Language: English
- Genre: Humor, satire
- Publisher: Charles L. Webster & Company
- Publication date: November 28, 1894
- Publication place: United States
- Media type: Print (hardcover, paperback)
- Pages: 337 pp
- Text: Pudd'nhead Wilson at Wikisource

Pudd'nhead Wilson is a novel by American writer Mark Twain published on 28 November 1894. Its central intrigue revolves around two boys—one, born into slavery, with 1/32 black ancestry; the other, white, born to be the master of the house. The two boys, who look similar, are switched at infancy. Each grows into the other's social role.

The story was serialized in The Century Magazine (1893–1894) and published as a novel in 1894.

== Plot ==
The setting is the fictional frontier town of Dawson's Landing on the banks of the Mississippi River in the first half of the 19th century. David Wilson, a young lawyer, moves to town, and a clever remark of his is misunderstood, which causes locals to brand him a "pudd'nhead" (nitwit). His hobby of collecting fingerprints does not raise his standing in the eyes of the townsfolk, who consider him to be eccentric and do not frequent his law practice.

"Pudd'nhead" Wilson is left in the background as the focus shifts to the slave Roxy, her son, and the family they serve. Roxy is one-sixteenth black and majority white, and her son, Valet de Chambre (referred to as Chambers), is 1/32 black. Roxy is principally charged with caring for her inattentive master's infant son, Tom Driscoll, who was born on the same day as her own son and whose mother died a week after giving birth. After fellow slaves are caught stealing and are nearly sold "down the river" to a master in the Deep South, Roxy fears for her son and herself. She considers killing her boy and herself but decides to switch Chambers and Tom in their cribs to give her son a life of freedom and privilege.

The narrative moves forward two decades. Tom Driscoll (formerly Valet de Chambre) has been raised to believe that he is white and has become a spoiled aristocrat. He is a selfish and dissolute young man. Tom's father has died and granted Roxy her freedom in his will. She worked for a time on riverboats and saved money for her retirement. When she finally is able to retire, she discovers that her bank has failed and all of her savings are gone. She returns to Dawson's Landing to ask for money from Tom.

Tom responds to Roxy with derision. She tells him the truth about his ancestry and that he is her son and partially black; she blackmails him into financially supporting her.

Twin Italian noblemen visit Dawson's Landing to some fanfare, and Tom quarrels with one. Desperate for money, Tom robs and murders his wealthy uncle, and the blame falls wrongly on one of the Italians. From that point, the novel proceeds as a crime novel. In a courtroom scene, the whole mystery is solved when Wilson demonstrates, through fingerprints, that Tom is both the murderer and not the true Driscoll heir.

Although the real Tom Driscoll's rights are restored, his life changes for the worse. Having been raised as a slave, he feels intensely uneasy in white society. At the same time, as a white man, he is essentially excluded from the company of blacks.

In a final twist, the creditors of Tom's father's estate successfully petition the governor to have Tom's (Chambers) prison sentence overturned. Shown to be born to a slave mother, he is classified as a slave and is legally included among the property assets of the estate. He is sold "down the river", helping the creditors recoup their losses.

== Major themes ==
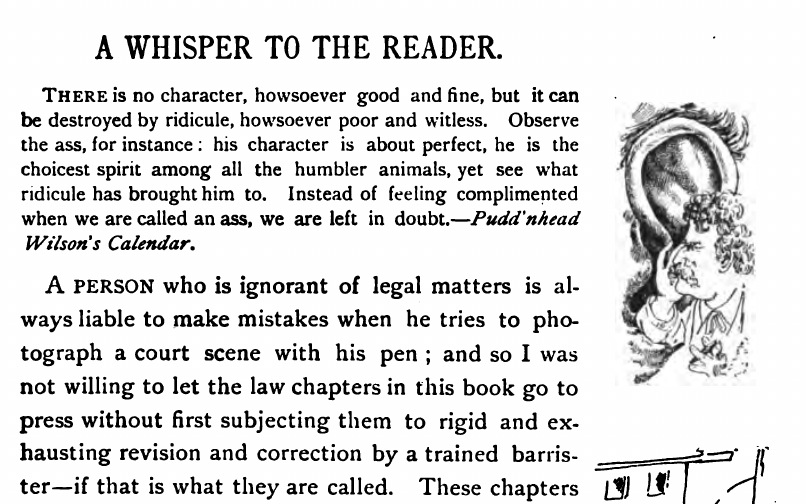
Mark Twain whispers into the reader's ear in his preface to the book, whose first edition features such marginal illustrations on every page.

Mark Twain's satire humorously and pointedly lambastes everything from small-town politics and religious beliefs to slavery and racism.

=== Irony and small-town life ===
David Wilson makes a joke that is misunderstood by the townsfolk of Dawson's Landing, who take Wilson's words literally. They consider the subtle, intelligent Wilson to be a simpleton. Word of the joke spreads quickly, and Wilson becomes known as "Pudd'nhead" for being a fool in the eyes of the townspeople.

=== Racism and nature versus nurture ===
The first part of the book seems to satirize racism in antebellum Missouri by exposing the fragility of the dividing line between white and black. The new Tom Driscoll is accepted by a family with high Virginian ancestry as its own, and he grows up to be corrupt, self-interested, and distasteful. The reader does not know, at the end of the story, whether Tom's behavior results from nature or nurture. Naturalistic readings risk framing the story as a vindication of racism based on biological differences too subtle to be seen. (The essentialism is not reciprocal, however. Chambers adapts well to life as a slave and fails to successfully assume his proper place as a high-class white.)

=== Technology and subversion ===
The novel features the technological innovation of the use of fingerprints as forensic evidence. "The reader knows from the beginning who committed the murder, and the story foreshadows how the crime will be solved. The circumstances of the denouement, however, possessed in its time great novelty, for fingerprinting had not then come into official use in crime detection in the United States. Even a man who fooled around with it as a hobby was thought to be a simpleton, a 'pudd'nhead'."

== Characters ==
=== Roxy ===
Roxana is a slave, originally owned by Percy Driscoll and freed upon his death. Roxy is 1/16 black, or 15/16 white. With a fair complexion, brown eyes, and straight brown hair, she looks more white than black, which makes sense based on her ancestry. Since she was born into slavery, she is still considered a slave and is associated with blacks. She identifies as black and speaks the dialect of slaves in the antebellum Deep South. She is the mother of Valet de Chambre and acts as a nanny to Thomas Driscoll. Due to her son's overwhelming percentage of European ancestry and appearance, she switches him with Driscoll's son when the boys are infants, hoping to guarantee Chambers's freedom and an upper-class upbringing.

=== Tom Driscoll, who becomes Chambers ===
Thomas à Becket Driscoll is the son of Percy Driscoll. Tom is switched with Roxy's baby, Chambers, when he is a few months old and is called "Chambers" from then on. Raised as a slave, Chambers is purchased by his uncle Judge Driscoll after his brother Percy dies. The judge is childless and sad and wants to prevent the young man Tom Driscoll from selling Chambers downriver. Chambers is portrayed as a decent young man whom Tom forces to fight bullies. He is kind and always respectful toward Tom but receives brutal treatment by his master. He shares diction with other slaves.

=== Chambers, who becomes Tom Driscoll ===
Valet de Chambre is Roxy's son. Chambers is 1/32 black and as Roxy's son, was born into slavery. At a young age, he is switched by his mother with Thomas à Becket Driscoll, a white child of the same age born into an aristocratic family in the small town. From then on, he is known as "Tom" and is raised as the white heir to a large estate. Tom is spoiled, cruel, and wicked. In his early years, he has an intense hate for Chambers, although the other boy protects Tom and saves his life on numerous occasions. Tom attends Yale University for two years and returns to Dawson's Landing with "Eastern polish", which results in the locals disliking him more.

Tom is portrayed as the embodiment of human folly. His weakness for gambling leads him into debt. After his father's death, he is adopted by his uncle, Judge Driscoll, who frequently disinherits him, only to rewrite his will again to include him.

=== Capello twins ===
Luigi and Angelo Capello, a set of near-identical twins, appear in Dawson's Landing in reply to an ad placed by Aunt Patsy, who is looking for a boarder. They say they want to relax after years of traveling the world. They claim to be the children of an Italian nobleman who was forced to flee Italy with his wife after a revolution. He died soon afterward, followed by his wife. One of the twins, who is said to have killed a man, kicks Tom because he makes a joke about him at a town meeting. As a result, Judge Driscoll challenges the twin, Luigi, to a duel.

=== David "Pudd'nhead" Wilson ===
Wilson is a lawyer who came to Dawson's Landing to practice law but was unable to succeed at his law practice after alienating the locals. He establishes a comfortable life in the town, working as a bookkeeper and pursuing his hobby of collecting fingerprints. Although the title character, he remains in the background of the novel until the final chapters.

Each chapter begins with clever quotations from Pudd’nhead Wilson’s Calendar, a project of Wilson's that endears him to Judge Driscoll but further confirms everyone else's opinion of him as a "pudd’nhead".

== Those Extraordinary Twins ==
Twain originally envisioned the characters of Luigi and Angelo Capello as conjoined twins, modeled after the late-19th-century conjoined twins Giovanni and Giacomo Tocci. He planned for them to be the central characters of a novel to be titled Those Extraordinary Twins.

During the writing process, however, Twain realized that secondary characters such as Pudd'nhead Wilson, Roxy, and Tom Driscoll were taking a more central role in the story. More importantly, he found that the serious tone of the story of Roxy and Tom clashed unpleasantly with the light tone of the twins' story. As he explains in the introduction to "Those Extraordinary Twins":

The defect turned out to be the one already spoken of – two stories on one, a farce and a tragedy. So I pulled out the farce and left the tragedy. This left the original team in, but only as mere names, not as characters.

The characters of Luigi and Angelo remain in Pudd'nhead Wilson, as twins with separate bodies. Twain was not thorough in his separation of the twins, and there are hints in the final version of their conjoined origin, such as the fact that they were their parents' "only child", they sleep together, they play piano together, and they had an early career as sideshow performers.

"Those Extraordinary Twins" was published as a short story, with glosses inserted into the text where the narrative was either unfinished or would have duplicated parts of Pudd'nhead Wilson.

== Reception ==
F R Leavis was influential in his reassessment of the novel.

== In other media ==
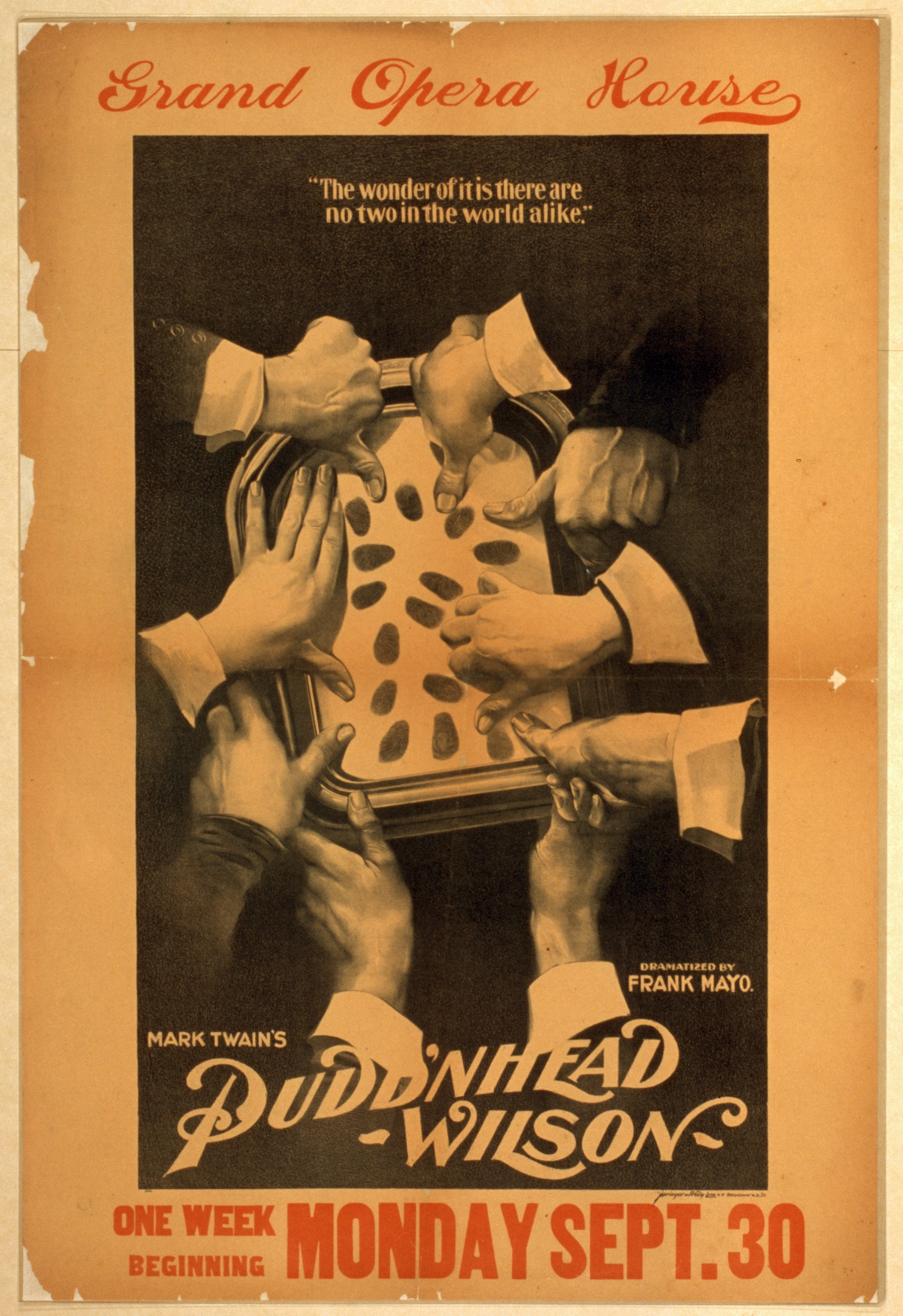
Poster for Frank Mayo's 1895 stage adaptation of Pudd'nhead Wilson

=== Theatre ===
Frank M. Mayo produced a theatrical adaptation in 1895 and played Wilson.

=== Film ===
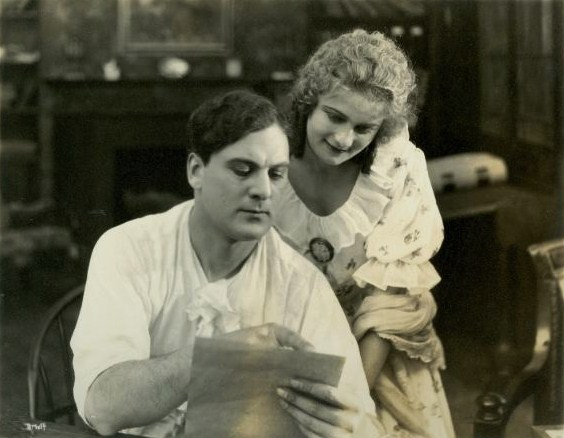
Thomas Meighan (Tom/Chambers) and Florence Dagmar (Rowena Cooper) in the silent 1916 film

A film in 1916 and a TV movie in 1984 were based on the book.

== Homages ==
The 1993 The Adventures of Brisco County, Jr. episode "Brisco for the Defense" is loosely based on the novel, which is featured as the inspiration for the final twist. However, the episode takes place in 1893, a year before the book was published in novel form.

== See also ==
- Mark Twain bibliography
- Babies switched at birth
- H.M.S. Pinafore
