= Yolanda and the Thief =

1945 film by Vincente Minnelli

- Magazine advertisement for the film
- Directed by: Vincente Minnelli
- Screenplay by: Irving Brecher
- Based on: "Yolanda and the Thief"; 1943 story in Town & Country by Ludwig Bemelmans; Jacques Théry
- Produced by: Arthur Freed
- Starring: Fred Astaire; Lucille Bremer; Frank Morgan
- Cinematography: Charles Rosher
- Edited by: George White
- Music by: Harry Warren; Arthur Freed (lyrics)
- Production company: Metro-Goldwyn-Mayer
- Distributed by: Loew's Inc.
- Release date: November 20, 1945
- Running time: 108 minutes
- Country: United States
- Language: English
- Budget: $2,443,322.31
- Box office: $1,791,000

Yolanda and the Thief is a 1945 American Technicolor MGM musical-comedy film set in a fictional Latin American country. It stars Fred Astaire, Lucille Bremer, Frank Morgan, and Mildred Natwick, with music by Harry Warren and lyrics by Arthur Freed. The film was directed by Vincente Minnelli and produced by Arthur Freed.

The film was a long-time pet project of Freed's to promote his lover Bremer's career, but fared disastrously at the box office. An attempt to create a whimsical fantasy, it ended up, in the words of critic John Mueller, as "egg-nog instead of the usual champagne". Despite admirable production values, it ruined Bremer's career and discouraged Astaire, who decided to retire after his next film, Blue Skies.

Perhaps it also vindicated Astaire's own horror of "inventing up to the arty"—his phrase for the approach of those who would set out to create art, whereas he believed artistic value could only emerge as an accidental and unpremeditated by-product of a tireless search for perfection. In his autobiography, Astaire approvingly quotes Los Angeles Times critic Edwin Schallert: "'Not for realists' is a label that may be appropriately affixed to Yolanda and the Thief. It is a question, too, whether this picture has the basic material to satisfy the general audience, although in texture and trimmings it might be termed an event." Astaire himself concluded, "This verified my feeling that doing fantasy on the screen is an extra risk."

== Plot ==
In the pastoral country of Patria, young Yolanda Acquaviva celebrates her birthday in a convent among her fellow students. She has turned 18, and must now take over management of her family fortune, formerly overseen by her Aunt Amarilla. Yolanda feels unprepared, but the mother superior assures Yolanda that her guardian angel will watch over her.

Meanwhile two American con men, Johnny Riggs and Victor Trout, have come to Patria because it has no extradition laws. On the train ride through the Patrian countryside, they learn of the vast Acquaviva fortune from a waiter. They are shown a newspaper reporting on the young heiress, Yolanda. They speculate on how they might take advantage of this opportunity.

Yolanda is greeted at her estate by Aunt Amarilla and many servants. Later, alone in the garden, Yolanda says a prayer to her guardian angel asking for guidance. Unseen by her, Johnny overhears.

Johnny telephones Yolanda, claiming to be her guardian angel. He tells her that he will help her but cannot appear in angelic form. He will meet her in human disguise. The naive girl agrees. At their meeting he tells her to call him Mr. Brown. He claims that he will take away the burden of her wealth. She is easily deceived and agrees to his plans.

Johnny dreams about Yolanda and it unsettles him. Nonetheless, Johnny sticks to the plan with his partner to steal valuable bonds from the accommodating Yolanda. They succeed but run into difficulty in escaping. The situation throws Johnny and Victor together with a third gentleman, Mr. Candle. Candle claims to want what is best for Yolanda. Johnny realizes that he wants this too and returns the bonds. Yolanda has become enamored with Johnny. Believing himself undeserving, Johnny tries to leave the country. Mr. Candle stops Johnny and reveals himself to be Yolanda’s true guardian angel. He wants Johnny to return to Yolanda as a reformed man. In the end Johnny marries Yolanda.

== Cast ==
- Fred Astaire as Johnny Parkson Riggs
- Lucille Bremer as Yolanda
- Frank Morgan as Victor Budlow Trout
- Mildred Natwick as Aunt Amarilla
- Mary Nash as Duenna
- Leon Ames as Mr. Candle
- Ludwig Stössel as School Teacher
- Jane Green as Mother Superior
- Remo Bufano as Puppeteer
- Francis Pierlot as Padre
- Leon Belasco as Taxi Driver
- Ghislaine Perreau as Gigi
- Charles La Torre as Police Lieutenant
- Michael Visaroff as Major Domo

== Production ==
Filming began on January 15, 1945. It was first previewed on July 11, 1945 in Glendale, California. It cost $2,443,322.31 to make and suffered a net loss of $1,644,000.

== Key songs/dance routines ==
Eugene Loring was responsible for most of the choreography, with Astaire for once taking a back seat and contributing only in parts. Tactfully, Astaire claimed he wanted to see what it would be like dancing to other choreographers' ideas, a move some critics have attributed to a putative temporary decline in Astaire's creative powers around this time, but it is equally possible that he found the artistic pretensions of the project somewhat off-putting.

The film features possibly the first example on film of the deliberate integration of color and visual pattern with dance—a theme which Minnelli explored on a larger scale and to such celebrated effect six years later with Gene Kelly in the dream ballet finale of An American in Paris. Astaire had already created an early dream dance on film with "I Used To Be Color Blind" in Carefree (1938), and had worked with Minnelli on a dream ballet insert for the "Limehouse Blues" number from Ziegfeld Follies (1945). The dream ballet genre achieved popularity when Agnes de Mille choreographed a celebrated sequence for the 1943 stage hit Oklahoma!.

- "This Is a Day for Love": Bemelmans conducts the school pupils in their national anthem.
- "Angel": Conned into believing that Astaire is her guardian angel, Bremer sings this song of anticipation.
- "Dream Ballet": An extended (approximately 15 minute) routine for Astaire, Bremer, and various others, which Minnelli has described as, "the first surrealistic ballet in film". The Dali-esque scenery and the main characters (Astaire and Bremer) are dressed in pastel shades as are characters in harmony with them - such as the three handmaidens near the end. Most of the other characters - who have an aggressive, disruptive quality, and bring spiky dance rhythms into play - wear vivid primary colors making them stand out from the background scenery and from the main characters, adding to the powerful illusion of space - a quality remarked upon by New York Times dance critic James Martin at the time. In the middle of the ballet, Astaire inserts a romantic duet for himself and Bremer to "Will You Marry Me", performed by Bremer and the dubbed-in voice of Trudy Erwin, and much of the choreography of this section has been said to bear the signature of Astaire himself.
- "Yolanda": Astaire serenades Bremer with this attractive melody while playing the harp (dubbed by jazz harpist Bobby Maxwell). He follows the song with a very brief solo dance routine around the harp.
- "Coffee Time": A jazzy and exuberant dance routine for Astaire, Bremer, and chorus, blending complex repeated syncopated rhythms (inspired by Loring's idea of setting a five-count dance phrase against a four-count musical phrase) in a visually elaborate setting incorporating a wavy black and white dance floor (designed by Irene Sharaff) and chorus dancers dressed in brightly colored costumes. The costumes, evocative singing, and twirling dance style of the chorus are evocative of whirling dervishes.

== Reception ==
Bosley Crowther of The New York Times gave the film a mixed review:

Taste and imagination are so rare these days in musical films that a good bit of both is sufficient to offset a pack of obvious faults. So that's why this corner is cheering for Metro's Yolanda and the Thief ... a pleasing compound of sparkling mummery and glistening allures for eyes and ears ... the terpsichorean cavorting of Lucille Bremer and Fred Astaire is simply grand. ... Mr. Astaire and Miss Bremer are plainly thrown considerably out of stride when they are called upon to ramble through some of the talkative scenes. The humor, to put it bluntly, is obvious and dull ... However, the visual felicities and the wackiness of the main idea hold the show together ...

The review in Variety was not complimentary:

There's an idea in this yarn, but it only suggests itself. It becomes too immersed in its musical background, and the story is too leisurely in pace. ... And the story itself, the way it's done, strains credibility.

On review aggregator Rotten Tomatoes, Yolanda and the Thief holds an approval rating of 80%, based on 5 reviews, and an average rating of 6.6/10.

== Box office ==
According to MGM records, the film earned $1,221,000 in the US and Canada and $570,000 elsewhere resulting in a loss of $1,644,000.

== Radio adaptation ==
Yolanda and the Thief was presented on Musical Comedy Theater on November 26, 1952. The one-hour adaptation starred Boris Karloff, Lisa Kirk, and John Conte.
