= The Country Boy (film) =

1915 film by Frederick A. Thomson

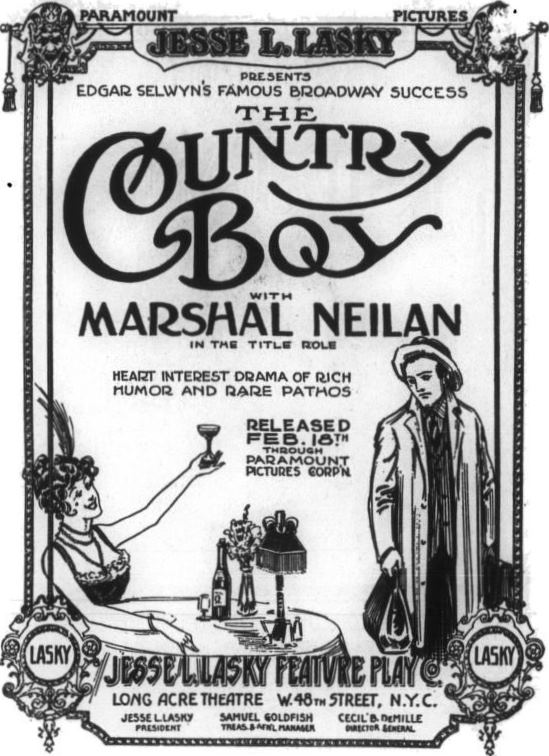
- Advertisement
- Directed by: Frederick A. Thomson
- Based on: The Country Boy by Edgar Selwyn
- Produced by: Jesse L. Lasky
- Starring: Marshall Neilan; Florence Dagmar; Dorothy Green; Loyola O'Connor; Mrs. Lewis McCord; Horace B. Carpenter
- Production company: Jesse L. Lasky Feature Play Company
- Distributed by: Paramount Pictures
- Release date: February 9, 1915
- Running time: 5 reels
- Country: United States
- Language: Silent (English intertitles)

The Country Boy is a lost 1915 American comedy silent film directed by Frederick A. Thomson based upon a play by Edgar Selwyn. The film stars Marshall Neilan, Florence Dagmar, Dorothy Green, Loyola O'Connor, Mrs. Lewis McCord, and Horace B. Carpenter. The film was released on February 18, 1915, by Paramount Pictures.

== Cast ==
- Marshall Neilan as Tom Wilson
- Florence Dagmar as Jane Belknap
- Dorothy Green as Amy Leroy
- Loyola O'Connor as Mrs. Wilson
- Mrs. Lewis McCord as Mrs. Bannon
- Horace B. Carpenter as Merkle
- Edgar Lewis as Weinstein
- Ernest Joy as Judge Belknap
- Tex Driscoll as Hez
- Al Ernest Garcia as Jimmy Michaelson
