= Behind Locked Doors =

1948 film by Budd Boetticher

- Theatrical release poster
- Directed by: Budd Boetticher
- Screenplay by: Eugene Ling; Malvin Wald
- Story by: Malvin Wald
- Produced by: Eugene Ling
- Starring: Lucille Bremer; Richard Carlson; Douglas Fowley; Tor Johnson
- Cinematography: Guy Roe
- Edited by: Norman Colbert
- Music by: Irving Friedman
- Production company: Aro Productions
- Distributed by: Eagle-Lion Films
- Release date: September 3, 1948 (United States)
- Running time: 62 minutes
- Country: United States
- Language: English

Behind Locked Doors is a 1948 film noir directed by Budd Boetticher and starring Lucille Bremer, Richard Carlson and Tor Johnson.

The title "Human Gorilla" for this movie can be found on various copies of this movie. Although the film features noir lighting and camerawork, depicts corruption, and provides suspense, it lacks most of the characterizations common to film noir. And it ends happily for the protagonists.

== Plot ==
At the behest of a pretty reporter, an amorously forward private detective goes undercover as a patient in a private sanitarium in search of a judge hiding out from the police. The two plan to split the $10,000 reward for the judge's capture. As the reporter and detective begin to fall in love, the detective also falls deeper into danger from an abusive attendant and difficult inpatients. The latter include an arsonist and "The Champ," a lunatic ex-boxer who attacks anyone put into a room with him after he hears what sounds like a bell.

== Cast ==
- Lucille Bremer as Kathy Lawrence
- Richard Carlson as Ross Stewart
- Douglas Fowley as Larson
- Ralf Harolde as Fred Hopps
- Thomas Browne Henry as Dr. Clifford Porter
- Herbert Heyes as Judge Finlay Drake
- Gwen Donovan as Madge Bennett
- Tor Johnson as The Champ, a patient
- Kathleen Freeman as Nurse (Uncredited)

== Production ==
It was the first of a three picture deal Boetticher had with Eagle Lion films.

== Reception ==
Reviews for the movie when released on DVD in 2002 were mixed. Keith Phipps, writing for the Onion AV Club, wrote of the film, "A probable inspiration for Sam Fuller's Shock Corridor, Doors suffers in comparison; Fuller made transcendent B-movies, and this isn't one. In just about every other respect, however, it's everything it should be: fast-paced, stylishly shot, a little lurid, a little topical, and thoroughly entertaining."

Film critic Dennis Schwartz gave the film a mixed review, writing, "Budd Boetticher directs a fast-paced low-budget B-film thriller with a far-fetched idea as its storyline and presents a shaky portrayal of the mental health profession. The film's claustrophobic and oppressive surroundings in a private mental hospital, moves this paranoiac tale somewhat into film noir territory ... No character was developed, the storyline never seemed believable, and despite the attempts made through the dark photography to create tension that wasn't possible because we didn't know enough about the lead characters and the villains were merely cardboard characters. Aside from being well directed, this melodrama has little else to recommend it. Boetticher is better known today for the many splendid Westerns he directed during the 1950s with Randolph Scott as star, which include Comanche Station, Ride Lonesome, and The Tall T."
