= Chimmie Fadden =

1915 American silent comedy film

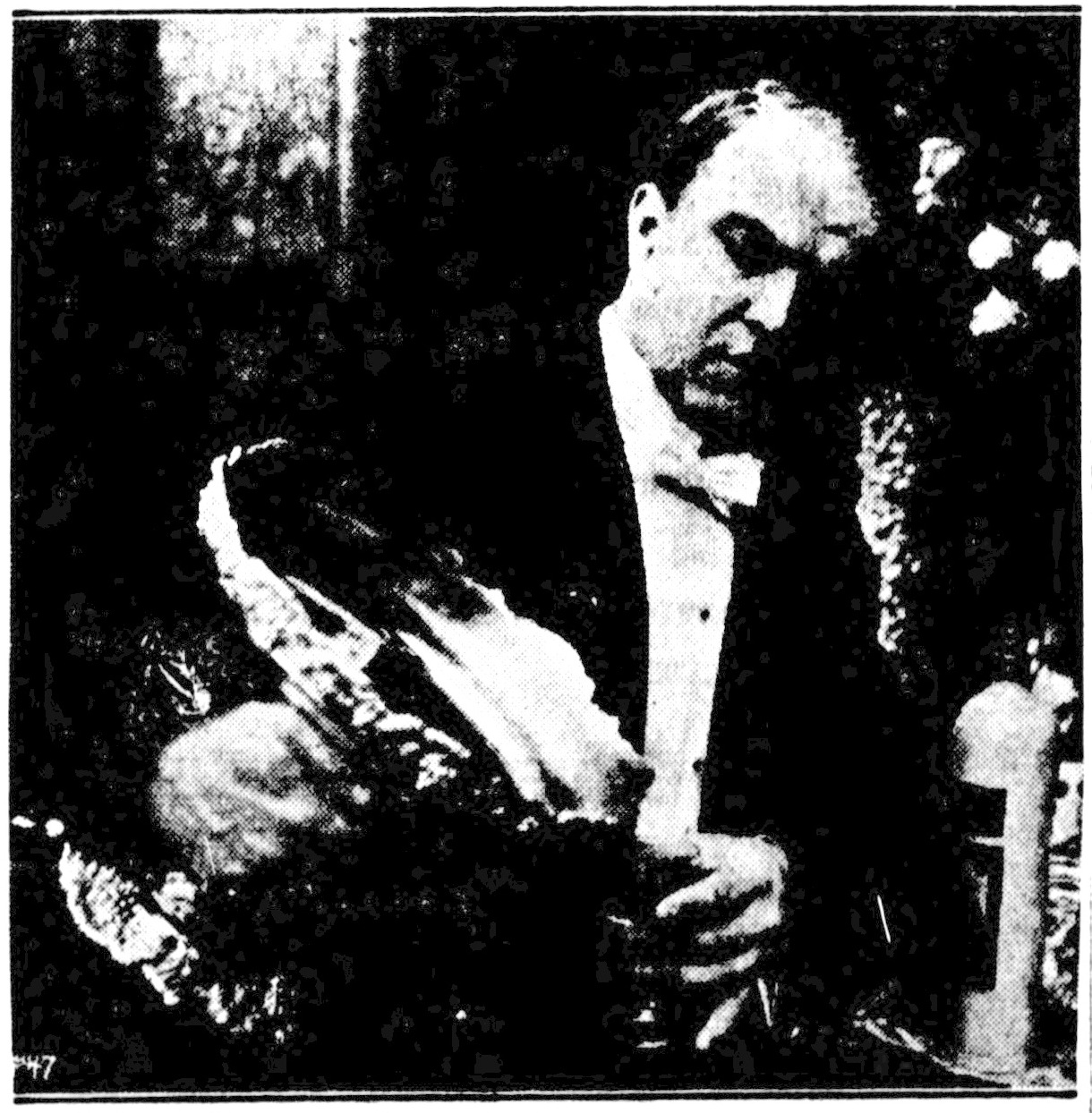
- Victor Moore in Chimmie Fadden
- Directed by: Cecil B. DeMille
- Written by: Cecil B. DeMille
- Based on: Chimmie Fadden by Edward W. Townsend
- Produced by: Cecil B. DeMille; Jesse L. Lasky
- Starring: Victor Moore
- Cinematography: Alvin Wyckoff
- Edited by: Cecil B. DeMille
- Production company: Jesse Lasky Feature Plays
- Distributed by: Paramount Pictures
- Release date: June 28, 1915
- Running time: 40 minutes
- Country: United States
- Languages: Silent; English intertitles
- Budget: $10,504.39
- Box office: $78,944.49

Chimmie Fadden is a 1915 American silent comedy film directed, written and edited Cecil B. DeMille. The film starred Victor Moore in the title role and is based on the play and short story of the same name by Edward W. Townsend. It was followed by a sequel Chimmie Fadden Out West. It is a surviving film formerly thought lost for decades. A print is kept at Cinemateket-Svenska Filminstitutet, Stockholm.

== Cast ==
- Victor Moore as Chimmie Fadden
- Raymond Hatton as Larry, His Brother
- Mrs. Lewis McCord as Mrs. Fadden, Their Mother
- Ernest Joy as Van Cartlandt, A Millionaire
- Anita King as Fanny, His Daughter
- Camille Astor as Hortense, French Maid
- Tom Forman as Antoine, Butler-Thief

== See also ==
- List of rediscovered films
