= Chimmie Fadden Out West =

1915 film

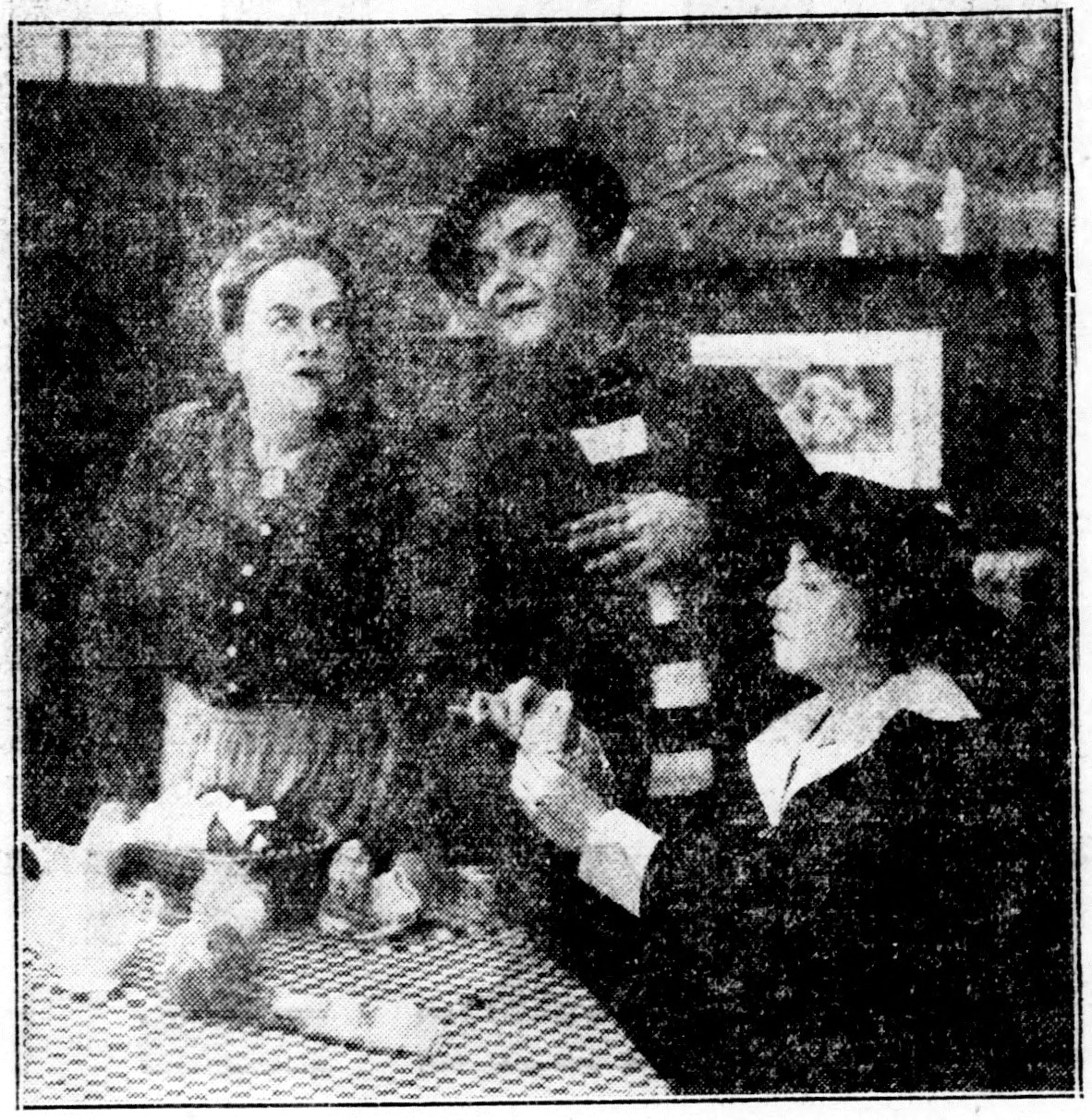
- Film still with Victor Moore (center)
- Directed by: Cecil B. DeMille
- Written by: Cecil B. DeMille; Jeanie MacPherson; Edward W. Townsend
- Produced by: Cecil B. DeMille
- Starring: Victor Moore
- Cinematography: Alvin Wyckoff
- Edited by: Cecil B. DeMille
- Production company: Jesse L. Lasky Feature Play Co.
- Distributed by: Paramount Pictures Corp.
- Release date: November 21, 1915
- Running time: 50 minutes
- Country: United States
- Languages: Silent; English intertitles
- Budget: $15,096
- Box office: $72,036

Chimmie Fadden Out West is a 1915 American silent Western comedy film directed by Cecil B. DeMille. It was made as a sequel to Chimmie Fadden.

Location shooting took place in Death Valley, California.

== Plot ==
Chimmie is sent out west as part of a scam by a railroad company. He is to pretend to find gold, then retreat as the company takes advantage. Things do not go as planned.

== Cast ==
- Victor Moore as Chimmie Fadden
- Camille Astor as The Duchess
- Raymond Hatton as Larry
- Mrs. Lewis McCord as Mother Fadden
- Ernest Joy as Mr. Van Courtlandt
- Tom Forman as Antoine
- Florence Dagmar as Betty Van Courtlandt
- Harry Hadfield as Preston
- Ramona the mule as herself
- Henry Bergman as the hotel keeper

== Preservation ==
A complete 35 mm print of Chimmie Fadden Out West is held by the George Eastman Museum in Rochester, New York.
