= Pudd'nhead Wilson (film) =

1916 film by Frank Reicher

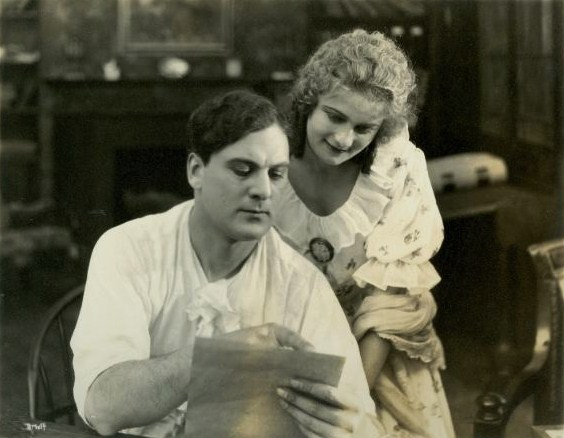
- Thomas Meighan and Florence Dagmar in Pudd'nhead Wilson
- Directed by: Frank Reicher
- Screenplay by: Margaret Turnbull
- Based on: Pudd'nhead Wilson by Mark Twain
- Produced by: Jesse L. Lasky
- Starring: Theodore Roberts; Alan Hale, Sr. Thomas Meighan; Florence Dagmar; Jane Wolfe; Ernest Joy
- Cinematography: Walter Stradling
- Production company: Jesse L. Lasky Feature Play Company
- Distributed by: Paramount Pictures
- Release date: January 31, 1916
- Running time: 50 minutes
- Country: United States
- Language: Silent (English intertitles)

Pudd'nhead Wilson is a 1916 American silent comedy film directed by Frank Reicher and written by Margaret Turnbull. The film stars Theodore Roberts, Alan Hale, Sr., Thomas Meighan, Florence Dagmar, Jane Wolfe, and Ernest Joy. The film was released on January 31, 1916, by Paramount Pictures.

== Plot ==
The film revolves around a murder mystery. The story takes place in the mid 19th century. A biracial nurse named Roxy swaps her son with her master's son. That son grows up as Tom Driscoll, while the real Tom grows up as the slave known as Chambers. Rowena Cooper comes from the North and falls in love with Chambers. Chambers is accused of murder and the eccentric lawyer Pudd'nhead Wilson looks for details. He uses fingerprints to uncover the real killer, but during his investigation he figures out Chambers and Tom were switched as infants.

== Cast ==
- Theodore Roberts as Pudd'nhead Wilson
- Alan Hale, Sr. as Tom Driscoll
- Thomas Meighan as Chambers
- Florence Dagmar as Rowena Cooper
- Jane Wolfe as Roxy
- Ernest Joy as Judge Driscoll
- Gertrude Kellar as Mrs. Driscoll

== Censorship ==
Like many American films of the time, Pudd'nhead Wilson was subject to cuts by city and state film censorship boards. For example, the Ohio Board of Censors, taking action to remove racist language in the film, required a cut of the intertitles "What you gwine to do for this chile, Marse? He's yours, too"; "You dirty nigger, how dare you touch a white woman?", "I've been working here . . . ain't I, nigger?", "I ain't your nigger any more, Marse Tom", "I'll pay you by buying one of Driscoll's yaller gals for you", "I hate all yellow girls. I don't feel like a nigger", "You're my son, nigger," "Out of my way, you old fool, I'm going to kill that nigger", and "Chambers, negro and slave", directing that in all intertitles that all references to the word "nigger" be removed, cut out the intertitle about a man riding ahead of his master, and remove the scenes where a white man resents the affectionate fondling of his mother and where a white man forcibly takes a young woman in his arms.

== Preservation ==
With no prints of Pudd'nhead Wilson located in any film archives, it is a lost film.
