= Those Without Sin =

- Directed by: Marshall Neilan
- Screenplay by: Thomas J. Geraghty; George DuBois Proctor; Harvey F. Thew
- Produced by: Jesse L. Lasky
- Starring: Blanche Sweet; Tom Forman; Clarence Geldart; Guy Oliver; James Neill; Charles Ogle
- Cinematography: Walter Stradling
- Production company: Jesse L. Lasky Feature Play Company
- Distributed by: Paramount Pictures
- Release date: March 1, 1917
- Running time: 50 minutes
- Country: United States
- Language: Silent (English intertitles)

Those Without Sin is a lost 1917 American silent drama film directed by Marshall Neilan, written by Thomas J. Geraghty, George DuBois Proctor and Harvey F. Thew, and starring Blanche Sweet, Tom Forman, Clarence Geldart, Guy Oliver, James Neill, and Charles Ogle. It was released on March 1, 1917, by Paramount Pictures.

== Cast ==
- Blanche Sweet as Melanie Landry
- Tom Forman as Bob Wallace
- Clarence Geldart as Richard Landry
- Guy Oliver as Henry Melon
- James Neill as Doctor Wallace
- Charles Ogle as Colonel Dackens
- George Beranger as Chester Wallace
- Mabel Van Buren as Estelle Wallace
- Dorothy Abril as Grace
- Edna Mae Wilson as Dackin's Daughter
- Billy Jacobs as Dackin's Son
- Mayme Kelso as Mrs. Wallace

== Preservation ==
With no holdings located in archives, Those Without Sin is considered a lost film.

== See also ==
- List of films and television shows about the American Civil War
