= Pay the Two Dollars =

Vaudeville sketch

Pay the Two Dollars is a vaudeville sketch in which a man is subject to increasingly draconian and unnecessary legal jeopardy because of his lawyer's unwillingness to pay a two-dollar fine. The catchphrase of the sketch has entered the popular lexicon to refer to a penalty that, even if the penalized party regards it as unjust, is too trivial to be worth contesting.

== Original sketch ==
Pay the Two Dollars was created by Willie and Eugene Howard for George White's Scandals of 1931 on Broadway. In the sketch, Willie Howard plays a humble city-dweller riding the subway with a lawyer friend, played by Eugene; when he is told by a conductor that he will be assessed a two-dollar fine for spitting on the floor of the train car, he seeks to pay it immediately and end the matter, but the lawyer insists on contesting it. Willie's character is then arrested, whereupon the lawyer mounts a series of preposterous legal challenges, each of which only increases the amount of trouble the protagonist is in until at last he is sentenced to death; at that point, the lawyer finally succeeds and gains clemency from the governor. The sketch was later included in the 1945 film Ziegfeld Follies, a tribute to vaudeville, featuring Victor Moore as the defendant and Edward Arnold as the lawyer. For the New York Times, Bosley Crowther called Arnold and Moore's version "passingly funny."

== Legacy ==
The original sketch has been seen to capture the capacity of the law to punish ordinary people arbitrarily while giving them the illusory impression that they can reason with it, and thus has repeatedly been compared to the work of Franz Kafka on that theme.

The catchphrase has entered the legal lexicon as a way to sum up the frustrating position of a defendant who is better off accepting an unwarranted penalty than contesting it. In this sense it was used by United States Supreme Court Justice Arthur Goldberg in his dissent to Marder v. Massachusetts, calling it "generally sound advice" but not necessarily "constitutionally permissible." The phrase was used as the title of a 1957 book of practical advice on navigating the legal system by Alexander Rose. With its original vaudeville context in mind, Judge Benjamin Mehlman once used the phrase in ordering the comedian Mel Brooks to pay the village of Ocean Beach, New York a fine for improperly leaving his garbage can at the curb.
