= For Those We Love =

1921 film by Arthur Rosson

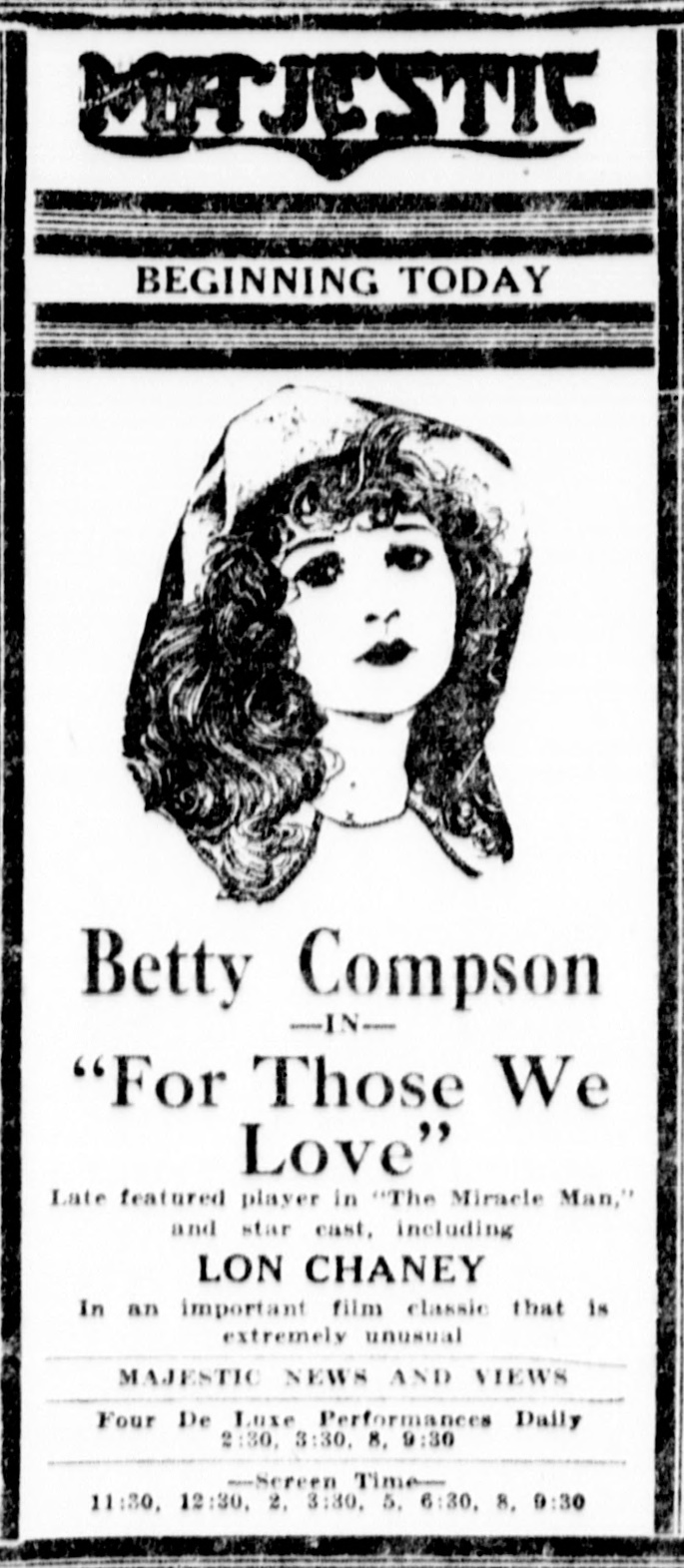
- Newspaper advertisement
- Directed by: Arthur Rosson
- Written by: Arthur Rosson
- Story by: Perley Poore Sheehan
- Produced by: Betty Compson
- Starring: Betty Compson; Lon Chaney; Richard Rosson
- Cinematography: Harold Rosson
- Distributed by: Goldwyn Pictures
- Release date: September 1921
- Running time: 6 reels; 5,752 feet
- Country: United States
- Language: Silent (English intertitles)

For Those We Love is a 1921 American silent romantic drama film produced by and starring Betty Compson, and featuring Lon Chaney and Richard Rosson. Written and directed by Arthur Rosson, the film was based on a story by Perley Poore Sheehan (who later co-wrote the script for Chaney's The Hunchback of Notre Dame. The film was distributed by Goldwyn Pictures. Some sources list the release date as being in March 1921. This is unlikely since the film was only copyrighted in July, but the exact release date has not been confirmed.

== Plot ==
Beatrice Arnold cares for her father George and her younger brother Jimmy. She is saved from drowning by a local card shark named Trix Ulner who decides to pursue her romantically, much to the chagrin of her longtime sweetheart, Johnny Fletcher.

Beatrice is shocked to learn that Jimmy's been embezzling funds from their dad to pay off his gambling debts to a crook named Frank. Beatrice enlists Ulner's aid to get back the money. Ulner and Jimmy plot to steal the money from Frank's house, but during the robbery, Jimmy is shot dead by Frank.

To save Jimmy's reputation, Ulner blackmails Frank into telling the authorities that Jimmy was killed protecting Frank from the burglar. At the end of the film, Beatrice marries her sweetheart, Johnny Fletcher. Trix Ulner decides to give up his unsavory ways.

== Cast ==
- Betty Compson as Bernice Arnold
- Richard Rosson as Jimmy Arnold
- Lon Chaney as Trix Ulner
- Frank Campeau as Frank
- Harry Duffield as George Arnold
- Walter Morosco as Johnny Fletcher
- Camille Astor as Vida
- Bert Woodruff as Dr. Bailee
- George Cooper as Bert

== Reviews ==
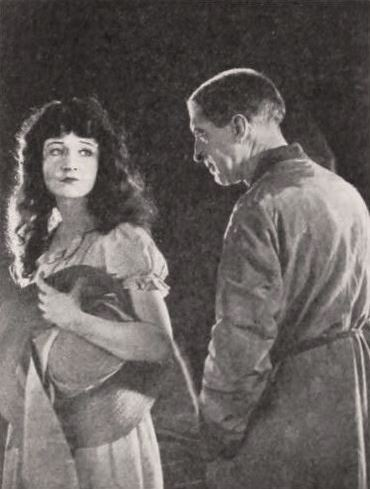
Still from the film featuring Compson and Campeau, from Exhibitors Herald, November 5, 1921

"The reason that this was the final production that the star [Compson] made in the role of producer is easily apparent to those that view it. It is without doubt one of the most incoherent stories that has been screened in a long, long time. Miss Compson has a corking company supporting her, which includes Lon Chaney and others of equal note, but even they cannot pull the picture through...The direction was draggy and wearisome from beginning to end and it did not move the story forward at all. This is a good one to pass up." ---Variety

"Among other good characterizations is that of Lon Chaney as the gambler, who would have an easy chance to over-act, but who cleverly avoids this. The picture should make money for the exhibitor." ---Moving Picture World

"There is just enough variety of situation and climax to this melodrama to carry it away from conventional channels. (Chaney's) gift for pathos is keenly emphasized. When he rescues the girl from various dangers, he inspires the greatest sympathy." ---Motion Picture News

== Preservation ==
For Those We Love is currently presumed lost. In February of 2021, the film was cited by the National Film Preservation Board on their Lost U.S. Silent Feature Films list.

A still exists showing Chaney holding the heroine.
