= Ain't That Ducky =

- Directed by: Friz Freleng
- Story by: Michael Maltese
- Produced by: Edward Selzer
- Starring: Mel Blanc; Victor Moore
- Music by: Carl W. Stalling
- Animation by: Gerry Chiniquy; Manuel Perez; Ken Champin; Jack Bradbury; Richard Bickenbach
- Color process: Technicolor
- Production company: Warner Bros. Cartoons
- Distributed by: Warner Bros. Pictures
- Release date: May 19, 1945
- Running time: 7 mins
- Language: English

Ain't That Ducky is a 1945 Warner Bros. Looney Tunes cartoon, directed by Friz Freleng. The cartoon was released on May 19, 1945, and stars Daffy Duck.

== Plot ==
Daffy Duck is interrupted during his bath by the distressing sobs of a yellow duckling carrying a satchel. Despite Daffy's attempts to inquire about the duckling's troubles, he is met with dismissive replies. Even the arrival of a hunter fails to deter the duckling's curt responses. As the hunter turns his attention to Daffy, the two engage in a familiar chase, with Daffy occasionally addressing the audience about missing elements in the scene.

Midway through, Daffy and the hunter briefly team up to obtain the satchel, but their efforts are thwarted when they encounter an obstacle on the road. After a series of mishaps, including Daffy's tumble down a mountainside, the hunter manages to grab the satchel. However, upon opening it, they discover only a piece of paper with the words "The End", leaving them as bewildered as the yellow duckling.

== Voice Cast ==
- Mel Blanc as Daffy Duck / Little Yellow Duck
- Victor Moore as The Hunter

== Production Notes ==
The Hunter portrayed in this cartoon is a caricature of actor Victor Moore, who voiced himself in this cartoon: a rare instance of a celebrety voicing a parody of themselves in a classic Warnrer Bros. cartoon. As director Friz Freleng remembered:

I approached him [Victor Moore] and wanted to know if he'd do it. He said he'd love to do it. We did a caracature of him, showed it to him, and he said, 'I love it, if you'd just give me a little more hair on my head.'"

Moore was such a fan of Looney Tunes that he reportedly provided his services for this cartoon free of charge.

== Home Media ==
- VHS 1986 - Viddy-Oh! For Kids Cartoon Festivals: Daffy Duck Festival Featuring "Ain't That Ducky" - MGM/UA Home Video
- VHS 1988 - Cartoon Moviestars: Just Plain Daffy - MGM/UA Home Video
- Laserdisc 1992 - The Golden Age of Looney Tunes: Volume 3 - MGM/UA Home Video
- Blu-Ray 2026 - Looney Tunes Collector's Vault: Volume 2 (restored) - Warner Archive Collection

== See also ==
- Daffy Duck filmography
- Looney Tunes and Merrie Melodies filmography (1940–1949)
