= Camille Astor =

American actress

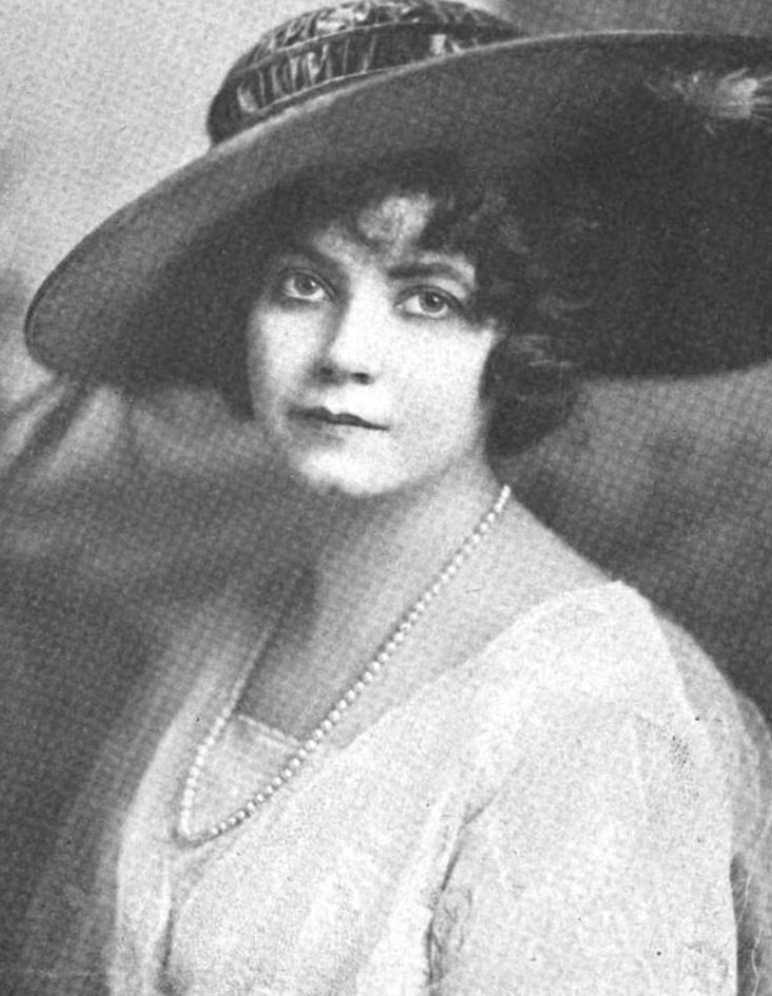
- Camille Astor, from a 1916 publication
- Died: September 16, 1944; Los Angeles, California
- Other names: Gracy Curry (in 1910), Camille A. Spurlin (after 1915), Camille A. Moore (after 1922)
- Occupation: Actress

Camille Astor (born before 1900 – died September 16, 1944) was an American actress in silent films.

== Early life ==
Astor usually said to have been born in 1885 in Brodnica, then a part of the Germany. During 1910 court testimony, she gave a different story, saying that she was born in Manchester, England as "Grace Curry", sometime before 1890, though this may also have been an embellished account. She trained as a dancer and was a proficient swimmer as well.

== Career ==
Astor was a dancer and actress in Los Angeles from at least 1910. Films featuring Astor included Chimmie Fadden and Chimmie Fadden Out West (both 1915, directed by Cecil B. DeMille), The Thousand-Dollar Husband (1916, starring Blanche Sweet), For the Defense (1916, directed by Frank Reicher), To Have and to Hold (1916, directed by George Melford), The Garden of Allah (1916, starring Helen Ware), and For Those We Love (1921, directed by Arthur Rosson). She earned an assistant director's credit on The Sowers (1916), working with William C. deMille and Frank Reicher. She was adept at languages, and helped with interpreting on some film sets. In 1915 she offered her services as a "Polish Red Cross nurse" and danced at war relief benefit events in Los Angeles.

== Personal life ==
Astor was named co-respondent in the first divorce of real estate broker DeKalb Spurlin in 1910, and married him as his second wife in 1915. Based on claims of infidelity and cruelty, they divorced in 1919, but she was threatened by a judge with jail time when she continued to harass her ex-husband in 1920. She married again in 1922, to engineer Jack Moore. She died in Los Angeles in 1944, in her fifties.
