= The Man from Home (1914 film) =

1914 film

The Man From Home
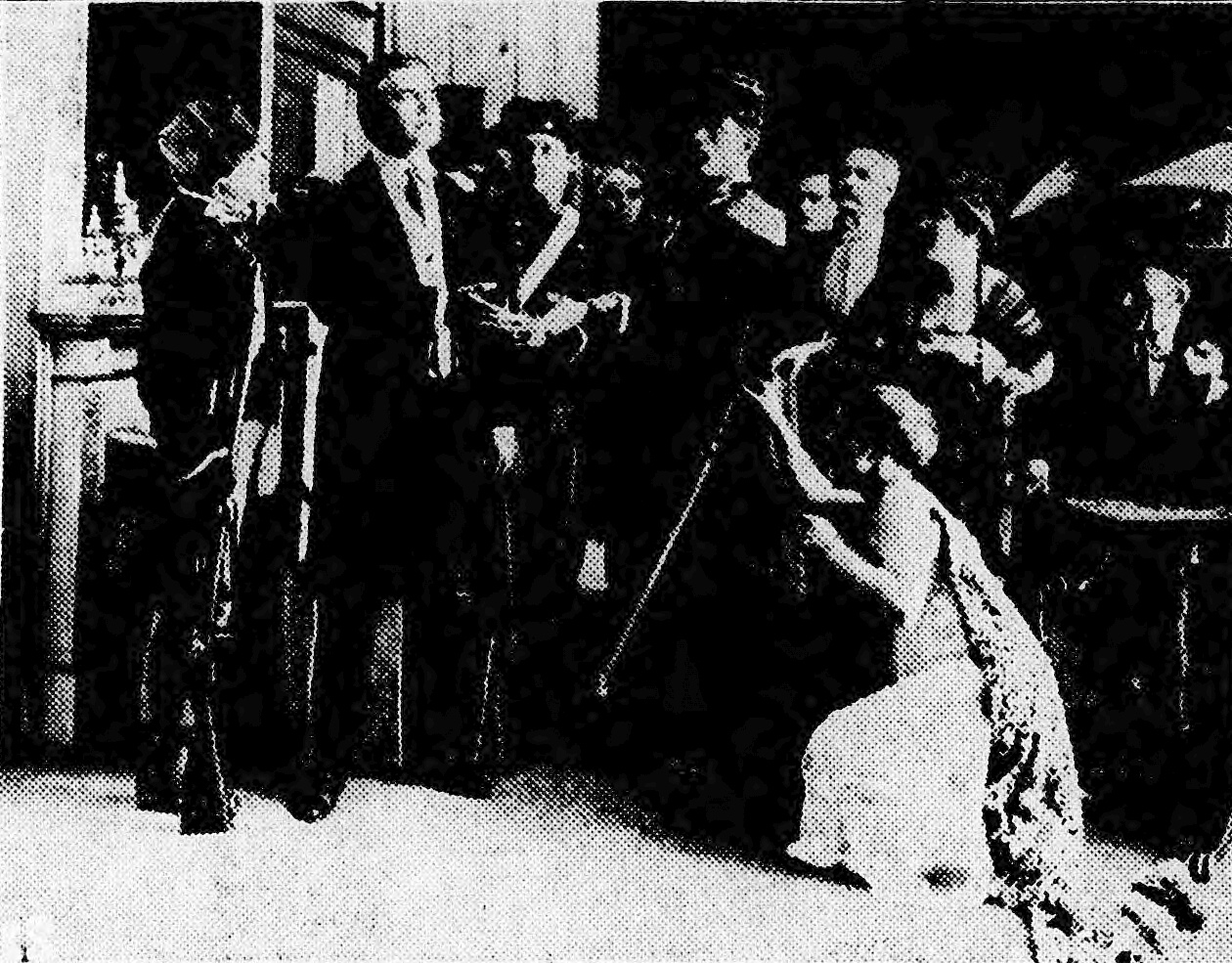
- Scene from the film.
- Directed by: Cecil B. DeMille
- Written by: Booth Tarkington (play); Harry Leon Wilson (play); Cecil B. DeMille
- Produced by: Jesse L. Lasky; Cecil B. DeMille
- Starring: Charles Richman
- Cinematography: Alvin Wyckoff
- Edited by: Cecil B. DeMille
- Production company: Jesse Lasky Feature Plays
- Distributed by: Paramount Pictures
- Release date: November 9, 1914
- Running time: 5 reels
- Country: United States
- Languages: Silent; English intertitles

The Man from Home is a 1914 American silent drama film based on a play written by Booth Tarkington and Harry Leon Wilson. It was directed by Cecil B. DeMille. In 1922, the story was remade in the UK by George Fitzmaurice as The Man From Home, and released by Famous Players–Lasky. The stage play was a big hit for actor William Hodge in the role of Pike in the 1908 Broadway season.

== Cast ==
- Charles Richman as Daniel Voorhees Pike
- Theodore Roberts as The Grand Duke Vaseill
- Fred Montague as Earl Of Hawcastle
- Monroe Salisbury as Hon. Almerce St. Aubyn
- Horace B. Carpenter as Ivanoff
- Jode Mullally as Horace Granger Simpson
- Dick La Reno as Old Man Simpson
- Mabel Van Buren as Ethel Granger Simpson
- Anita King as Helene, Countess De Champigney
- Bob Fleming as Ribiere (as Robert Fleming)
- Jack W. Johnston as Prefect Of Italian Police (aka J. W. Johnston)
- Florence Dagmar as Ivanoff Maid
- Tex Driscoll as Undetermined Role (uncredited)
- James Neill as Officer of Gendarmes (uncredited)

== Preservation status ==
Like many of DeMille's early films, this film is extant, preserved at the Library of Congress.
