= Little Billy films =

Series of short films

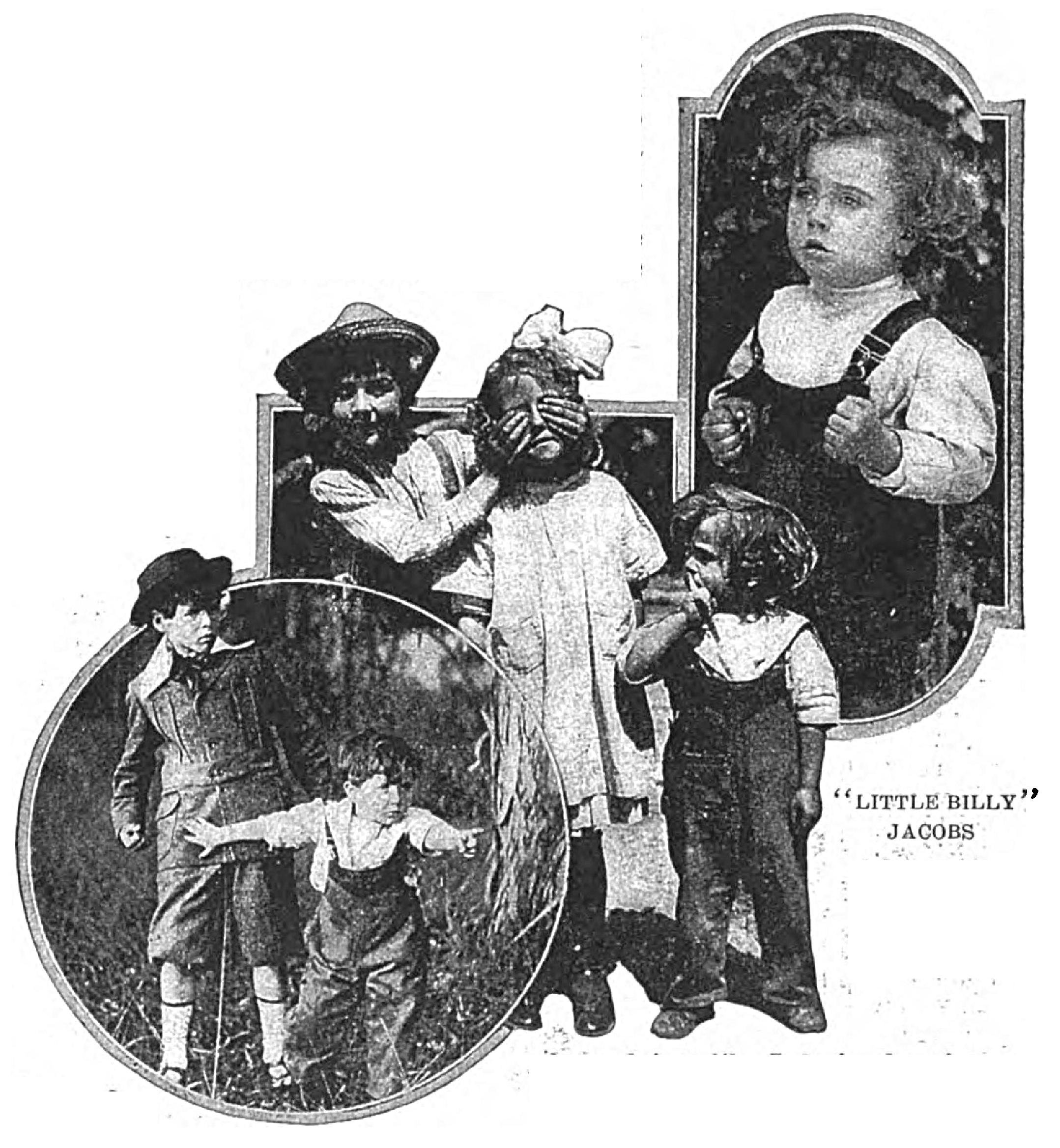
Scenes from the Little Billy films

The Little Billy films are a series of short films produced by Keystone Studios, revolving around the character of a small boy, portrayed by Paul "Little Billy" Jacobs.

Jacobs' mother, who lived near the Keystone Studios lot, appeared with her son as extras in crowd scenes. Director Henry Lehrman "discovered" the young man, and cast him in Our Children. The audience responded positively to Jacobs' appearance, and Lehrman built a group of "Keystone Kids" around Jacobs as "Little Billy".

Five films starring Jacobs were made at Keystone between 1913 and 1914:

- Our Children (November 17, 1913): Little Billy tangles with a tough kid.
- Little Billy's Triumph (January 29, 1914): Little Billy tries to get his dime back from two kids who want to put on a puppet show.
- Little Billy's Strategy (February 5, 1914): A kidnapping occurs at a birthday party.
- Little Billy's City Cousin (February 26, 1914): Little Billy's cousin visits, and flirts with girls.
- A Back Yard Theatre (March 30, 1914): The kids stage their own show.

The shorts also starred Gordon Griffith, Charlotte Fitzpatrick, Thelma Salter and Matty Roubert as regulars. Little Billy's Triumph was preserved by the Academy Film Archive in 2010.

In February 1914, Lehrman and Ford Sterling left Keystone Studios, and established Sterling Comedies at Universal Studios. The "Little Billy" comedies continued under the Sterling banner, with Jacobs now credited as "Billy Jacobs" or "Billie Jacobs".

The Universal "Little Billy" comedies included:

- Sergeant Hofmeyer (May 7, 1914)
- Papa's Boy (May 14, 1914)
- Billy's Riot (May 18, 1914)
- Kids (June 15, 1914)
- The Flirt (June 23, 1914)
- It's a Boy! (June 29, 1914)
- Billy's Vacation (July 6, 1914)
- A Beach Romance (July 16, 1914)
- A Race for Life (August 3, 1914)
- Lost in the Studio (August 20, 1914)
- A Rural Affair (August 24, 1914)
- The Broken Doll (September 7, 1914)
- The Battle (September 28, 1914)
- Billy's Charge (December 7, 1914)
- Carmen's Romance (December 21, 1914)
- Olive's Love Affair (January 7, 1915)
- Billie's Strategy (February 11, 1915)
- Billie Was a Right Smart Boy (February 11, 1915)
- Olive's Pet (March 25, 1915)
- Olive's Hero (April 1, 1915)
- Playmates (April 15, 1915)
- Her Filmland Hero (1915)
- Lizzie's Watery Grave (December 1, 1915)
- Little Billy's School Days (April 23, 1916)

The Sterling Comedies brand folded in 1915.

After the demise of Sterling Comedies, Jacobs continued to appear in films credited as Billy Jacobs, including The Heart of Nora Flynn (1916), The Clown (1916), The House with the Golden Windows (1916), The Garden of Allah (1916), Those Without Sin (1917), The Tides of Barnegat (1917), The Primrose Ring (1917), Unconquered (1917), A Hoosier Romance (1917) and Little Orphant Annie (1918).

Jacobs later became a writer, and worked for the Hollywood Spectator magazine.
