= Tex Driscoll =

American film and television actor

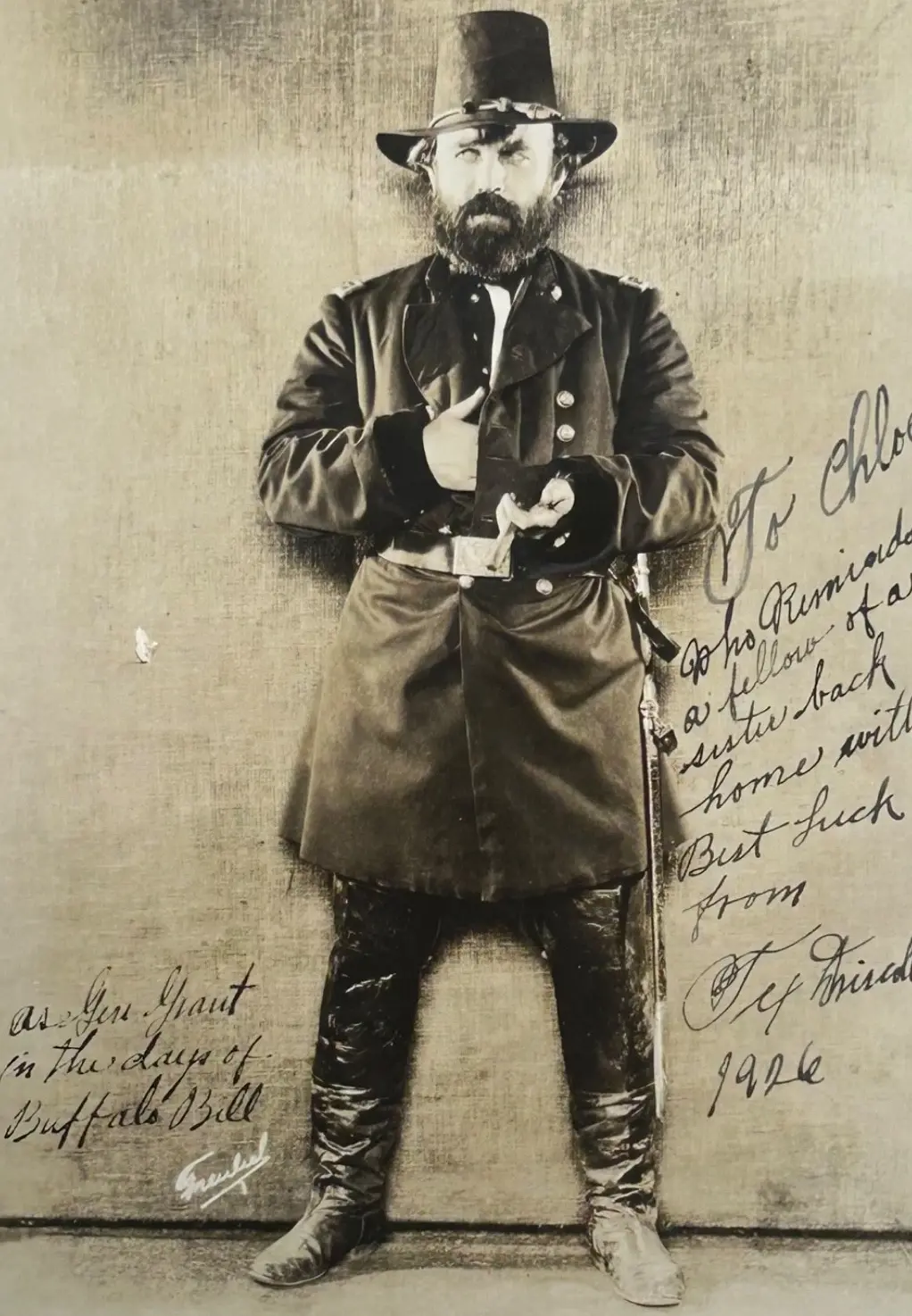
- Driscoll in 1922
- Born: John W. Morris; September 7, 1889; Wyoming, U.S.
- Died: June 1, 1970 (aged 80); Los Angeles County, California, U.S.
- Occupations: Film and television actor

John W. Morris (September 7, 1889 – June 1, 1970), known professionally as Tex Driscoll, was an American film and television actor.

== Life and career ==
Driscoll was born in Wyoming. He began his screen career in 1909, appearing in a William Selig film. In 1914, he appeared in the films The Squaw Man (as Clark), The Man from Home and The Virginian.

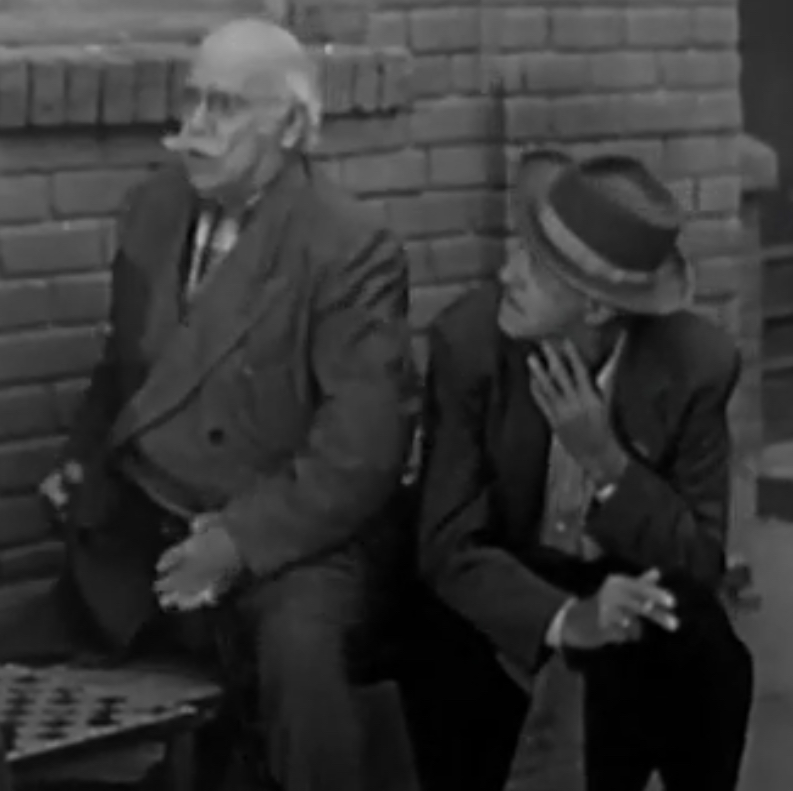
Driscoll (left) with Matthew McCue in Man with a Camera, 1958

Later in his career, Driscoll guest-starred in television programs including Hopalong Cassidy, The Lone Ranger, Stories of the Century, Laramie, Cimarron City, Man with a Camera and Death Valley Days. He also appeared in numerous films such as Giant (as oil millionaire Clay Hodgin Sr.), The Baron of Arizona, The Oklahoma Kid, Return of the Bad Men, Destry, The Ox-Bow Incident, Badlands of Dakota, The Girl of the Golden West, Nevada, West of the Rio Grande, High Noon, The Fiend Who Walked the West, North to Alaska and Deep in the Heart of Texas.

Driscoll retired from acting in 1964, last appearing in the CBS legal drama television series Perry Mason.

== Death ==
Driscoll died on June 1, 1970, in Los Angeles County, California, at the age of 80.
