= Lucille Bremer =

American actress (1917–1996)

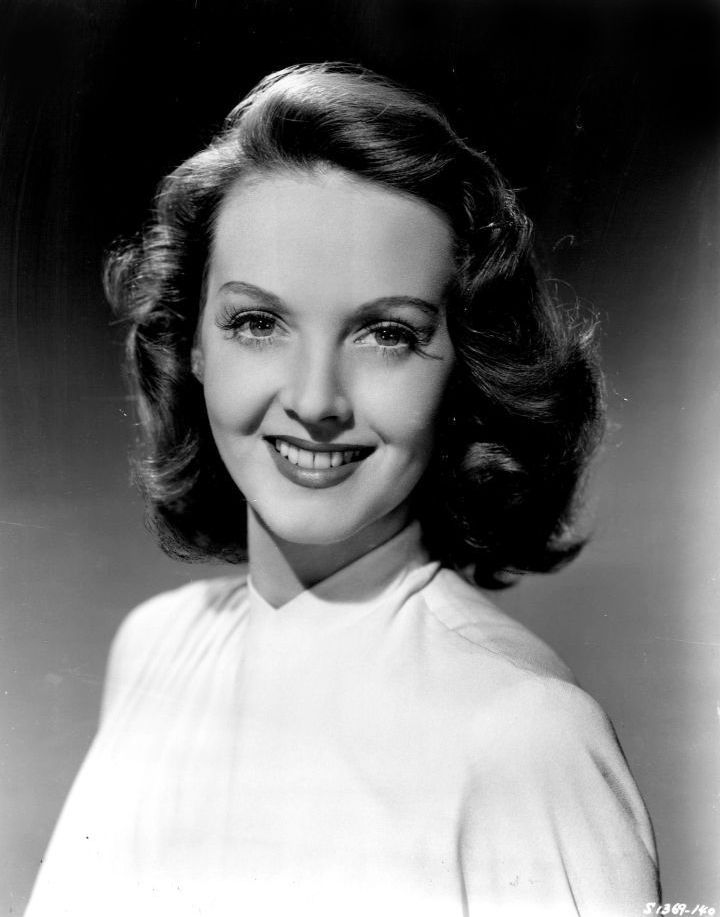
- Bremer in 1939
- Born: February 21, 1917; Amsterdam, New York, U.S.
- Died: April 16, 1996 (aged 79); La Jolla, California, U.S.
- Occupations: Actress, dancer
- Years active: 1933–1948
- Known for: Meet Me in St. Louis; Ziegfeld Follies
- Spouse: Abelardo Louis Rodriguez (m. 1948; div. 1963)
- Children: 4

Lucille Bremer (February 21, 1917 – April 16, 1996) was an American film actress and dancer.

== Biography ==
Bremer was born in Amsterdam, New York, but soon moved to Philadelphia, Pennsylvania, where she studied ballet. At age 12, she danced with the Philadelphia Opera Company.

=== Pre-Hollywood career ===
Once in New York, she danced in various specialty acts, most notably in the 1939 New York World's Fair "American Jubilee". She auditioned and began her career as a Rockette at Radio City Music Hall in New York City, at age 16. She was voted as "most likely to succeed" by her Rockette peers. She was also known as "5th from the right" in the Rockettes line up. Bremer also auditioned as a dancer for various Broadway shows, along with fellow stars Vera-Ellen and June Allyson, appearing as a 'Pony Girl' in the Broadway musical Panama Hattie and also in Lady in the Dark.

Bremer's first attempt at a career in films was unsuccessful. She said of her screen test with Warner Bros.: "It was so bad I realized why nothing had happened." She returned to dancing, performing at the Copacabana nightclub in New York City and the Club Versailles, where she was spotted by Arthur Freed, a producer at Metro Goldwyn Mayer. She was listed among six "Samba Sirens" for the Copacabana Revue's in the summer of 1942 outing in Saratoga Springs, New York, and as a singer-dancer as a Hotel Commodore "Commodorable" in 1943.

=== Career in film ===
Freed took her to Hollywood, where her screen test impressed Metro-Goldwyn-Mayer mogul Louis B. Mayer. She was offered a contract with Goldwyn Studios, but ultimately decided to sign with MGM so that she could showcase her dancing ability. An accomplished dancer, she was considered to display potential as a dramatic actress. She studied acting at MGM with the great acting coach Lillian Burns, and was groomed for stardom as an important member of the legendary Freed Unit.

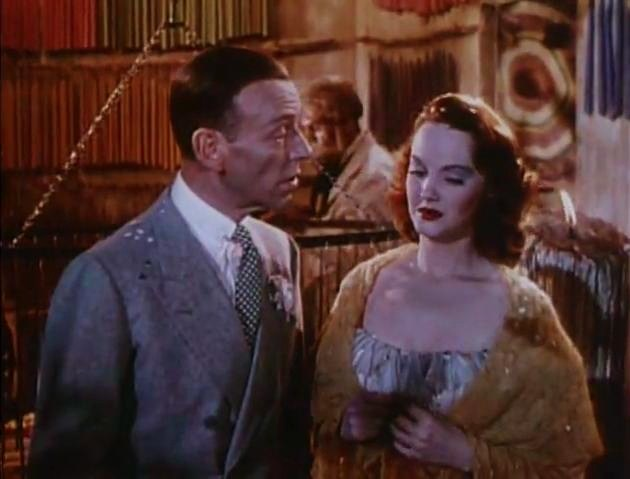
Bremer with Fred Astaire in Yolanda and the Thief (1945)

Bremer made her screen debut to excellent notices in director Vincente Minnelli's smash hit Technicolor musical Meet Me in St. Louis (1944) as Rose Smith, Judy Garland's older sister, and followed this with a starring role opposite Fred Astaire in the musical fable Yolanda and the Thief (1945). Despite sumptuous production values and a staff of high-priced talent behind the scenes (directed again by Vincente Minnelli from a story by Ludwig Bemelmans, with an original score by Harry Warren and producer/songwriter Arthur Freed, and choreographed by Fred Astaire and Eugene Loring), it was a box-office failure. The film's ambitious surrealist fantasy theme was not popular with wartime audiences, and Bremer, a newcomer in her first starring role, took most of the blame. Her career never recovered. She followed this disappointment with featured dance performances, once again with Astaire and directed by Minnelli, in two memorable sequences in the successful musical revue Ziegfeld Follies (released in 1946, but Bremer's numbers were filmed in 1945, before filming Yolanda and the Thief). Her last major film musical was the lavish Jerome Kern biopic Till the Clouds Roll By (1946), in which Bremer had some good dramatic scenes and dances with Van Johnson. After this, MGM began to lose interest in promoting her. After a minor dramatic film with MGM, Dark Delusion (1947), she was loaned to Eagle-Lion in 1948 for her final three films. Bremer played her last starring role in the film noir Behind Locked Doors (1948).

=== Life and career after MGM ===
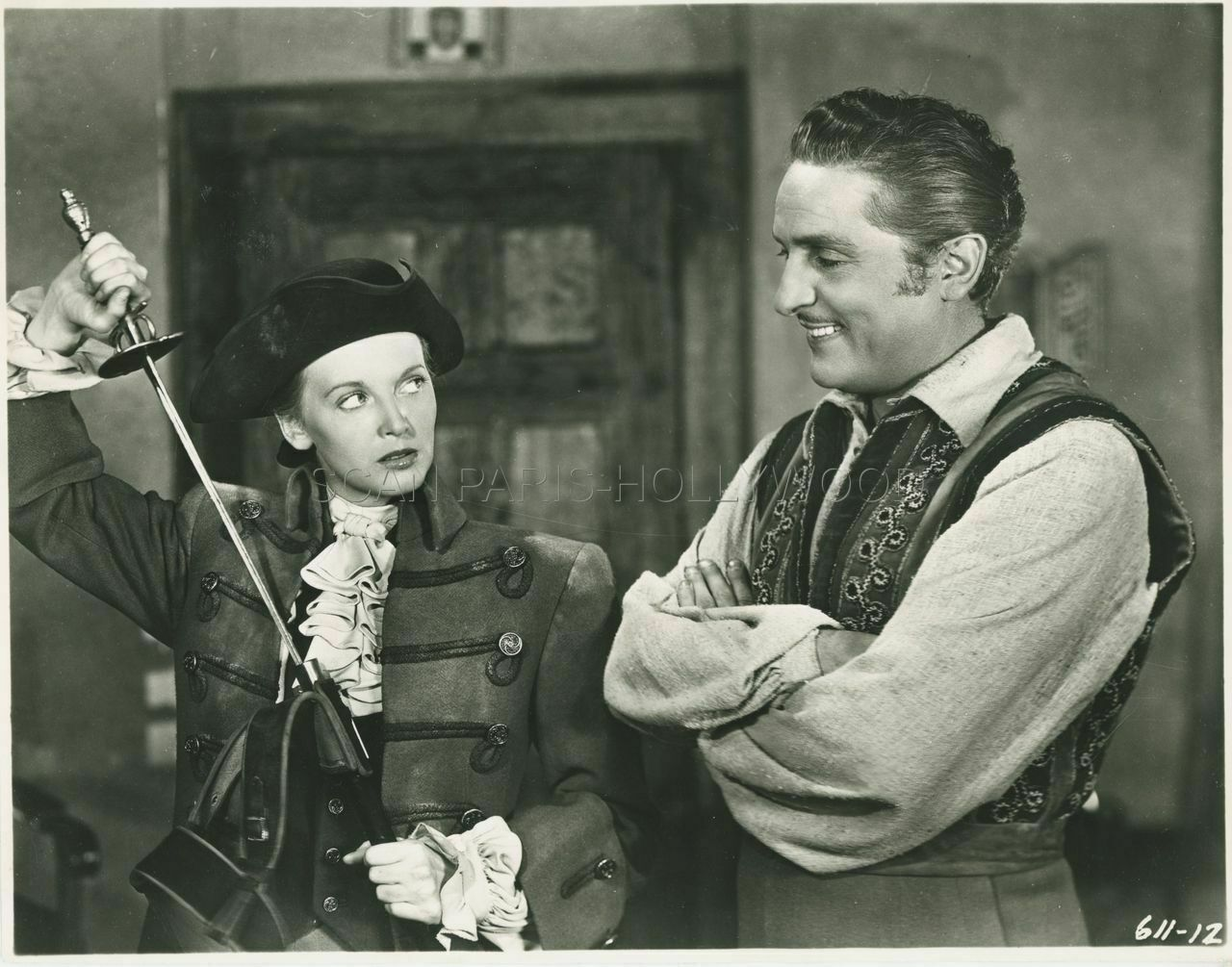
Bremer with Arturo de Córdova on Adventures of Casanova (1948)

One of her last films was alongside Mexican movie star Arturo de Córdova in Adventures of Casanova (1948).

Reportedly disappointed with her Hollywood career, she elected not to renew her contract and left the film industry. She had met and fallen in love with the son of the former president of Mexico, Abelardo Luis Rodriguez, who bore the same name as his father. She and "Rod" Rodriguez were married at Catalina Island in August 1948. She moved with him to Baja California Sur, Mexico, at the beginning of the Golden Age of Baja and started the private resort Rancho Las Cruces as well as the original Palmilla Hotel and the Hacienda Hotel. With her contacts in Hollywood and her husband Rod's influence, they drew people from Hollywood who sought to enjoy this newly found paradise. She and her husband were also business partners with Desi Arnaz, Lucille Ball, and Bing Crosby.

After her divorce (in 1963), Bremer settled in La Jolla, California, where she owned a children's clothing boutique. She continued to travel between La Jolla, California, and Baja California Mexico.

== Death ==
Bremer died in 1996 from a heart attack at age 79.

== Filmography ==
Year	Title	Role
1942	Penny Arcade (short film)	Woman
1944	This Love of Mine (short film)	Dancer
1944	Meet Me in St. Louis	Rose Smith
1945	Yolanda and the Thief	Yolanda
1946	Ziegfeld Follies	Princess ("This Heart of Mine") / Moy Ling ("Limehouse Blues")
1946	Till the Clouds Roll By	Sally Hessler
1947	Dark Delusion	Cynthia Grace
1948	Adventures of Casanova	Lady Bianca
1948	Ruthless	Christa Mansfield
1948	Behind Locked Doors	Kathy Lawrence
