= Victor Moore =

American actor (1876–1962)

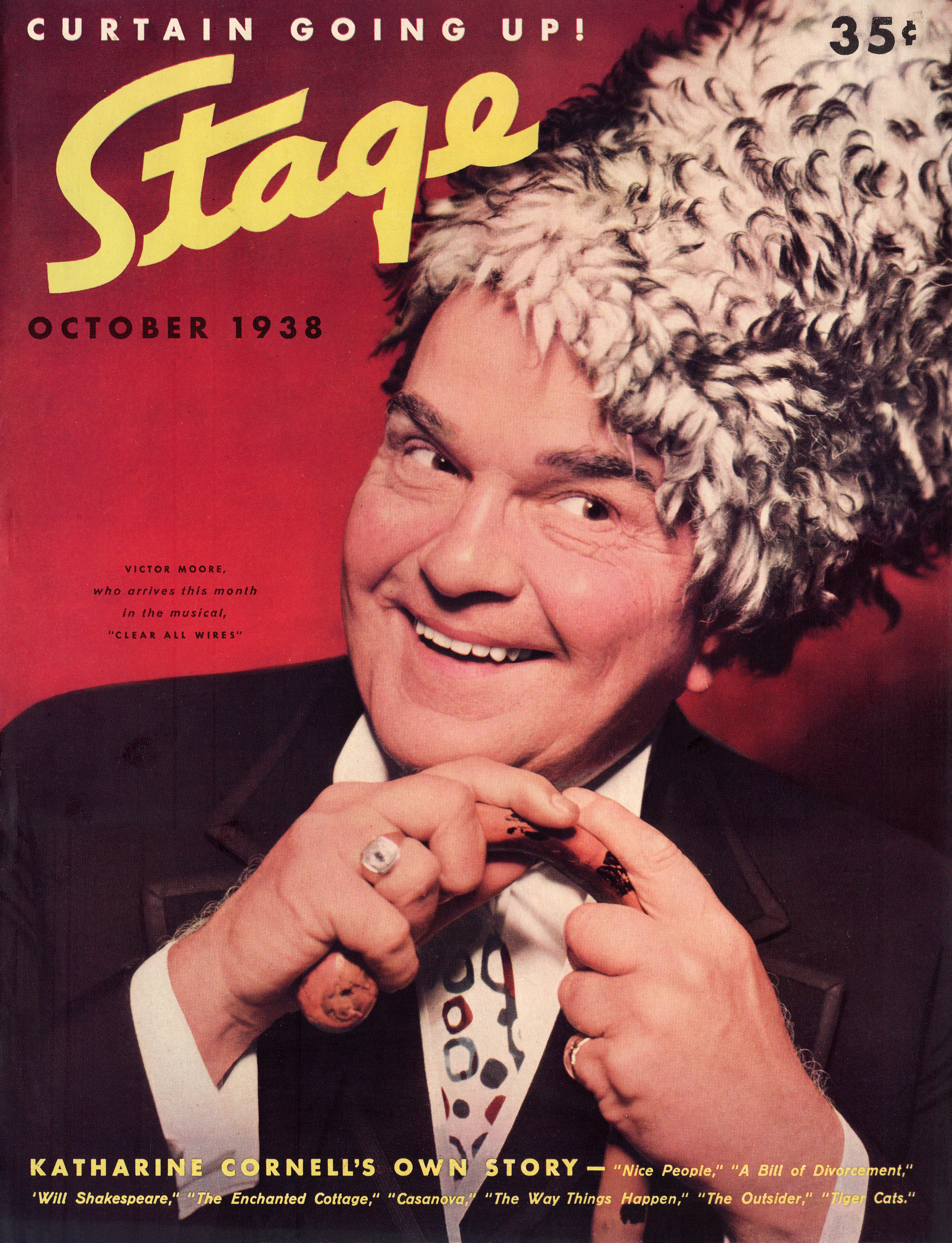
- Moore starring in the Cole Porter musical Leave It to Me (1938)
- Born: Victor Fred Moore; February 24, 1876; Hammonton, New Jersey, U.S.
- Died: July 23, 1962 (aged 86); East Islip, New York, U.S.
- Occupation: Actor
- Years active: 1893–1957
- Spouses: Emma Littlefield (m. 1903; died 1934) Shirley Paige (m. 1942)

Victor Fred Moore (February 24, 1876 – July 23, 1962) was an American actor of stage and screen, a major Broadway star from the late 1920s through the 1930s. He was also a writer and director, but is best remembered today as a comedian, playing timid, mild-mannered roles. Today's audiences know him as the star of a Christmas-themed movie that has become a perennial: It Happened on 5th Avenue (1947). Moore plays a vagrant who occupies a millionaire's mansion—without the millionaire's knowledge—while the owner is vacationing.

== Career ==
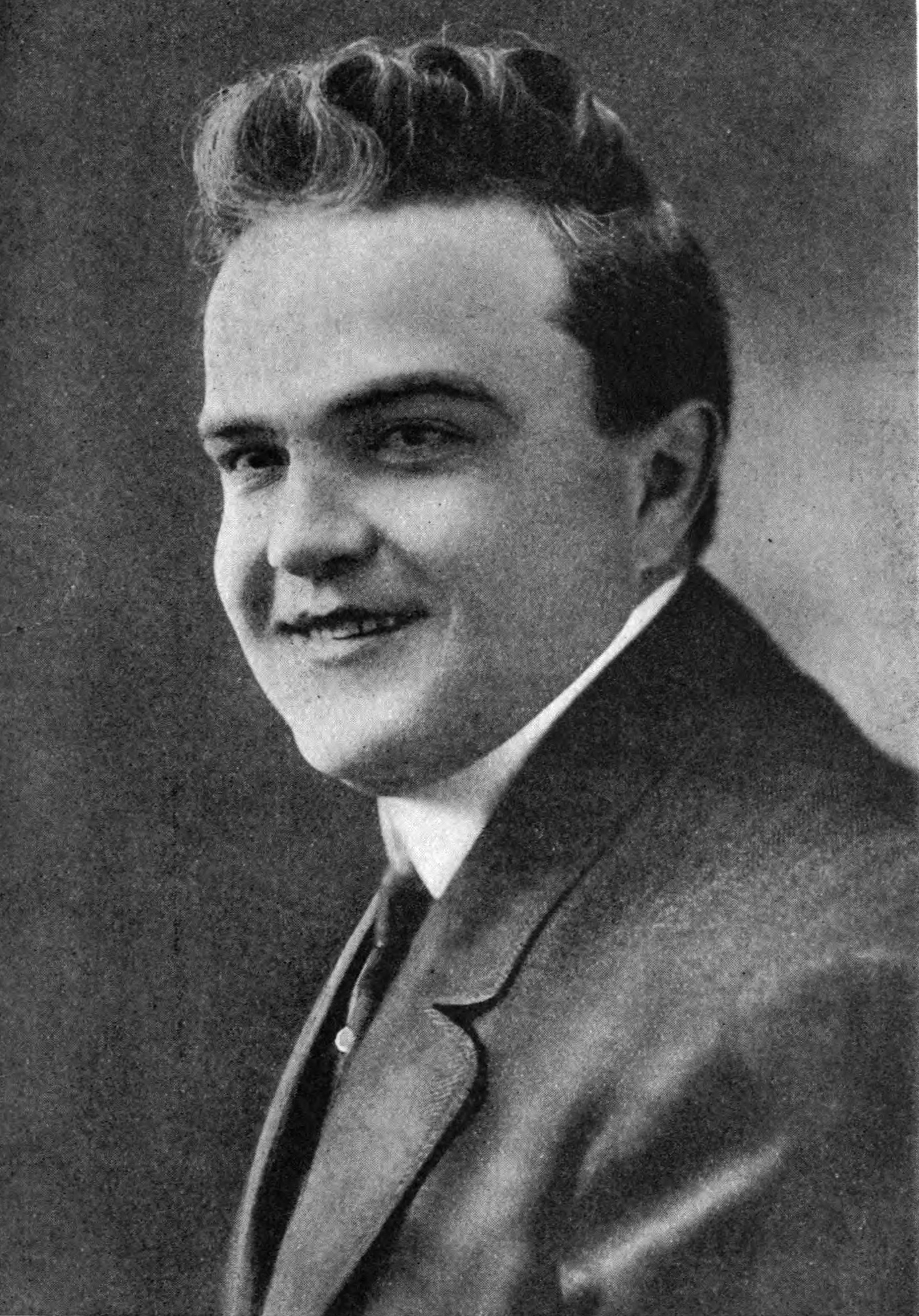
Moore in 1908

Victor Moore appeared in 21 Broadway shows and more than 50 films. His first appearance on Broadway was in Rosemary (1896). He also appeared in George M. Cohan's Forty-five Minutes from Broadway, which opened January 1, 1906, and its sequel, The Talk of New York (1907). He went on to star in shows such as Oh, Kay! (1926) as Shorty McGee, Hold Everything! (1928) as Nosey Bartlett, Gershwin's Of Thee I Sing (1931) as Vice-president Alexander Throttlebottom, Let 'Em Eat Cake (1933), Cole Porter's Anything Goes (1934) as Moonface Martin, and Irving Berlin's Louisiana Purchase (1940) as Senator Oliver P. Loganberry. Moore often appeared with actor William Gaxton, with Gaxton's self-assured slicker playing opposite Moore's worried friend.

Moore's talent was first recognized by screenwriter Beatrice deMille. He made his film debut in 1915. He starred in three films that year, two of which were directed by Cecil B. DeMille – Chimmie Fadden and Chimmie Fadden Out West. He also appeared in Swing Time (1936) with Fred Astaire and Ginger Rogers, Make Way for Tomorrow (1937), The Heat's On with Mae West, Duffy's Tavern (1945), Ziegfeld Follies (1946), On Our Merry Way (1948), A Kiss in the Dark (1949), and We're Not Married (1952), working with Ginger Rogers for a second time. His last screen appearance was a role as a plumber in The Seven Year Itch (1955).

He worked in film twice with Bob Hope, first in Louisiana Purchase (1941) and again in Star Spangled Rhythm (1942). In the film Ziegfeld Follies (1946), Moore enacted the famous "Pay the Two Dollars" sketch (in which Moore is arrested on a minor charge, only to have his lawyer steamroll the case into higher courts). Edward Arnold played the William Gaxton lawyer role.

Moore made a guest appearance as himself on The Martin and Lewis radio show on August 16, 1949, and was a regular (as himself) on The Jimmy Durante Show.

In 1945, Moore appeared in the Daffy Duck cartoon Ain't That Ducky. He was so pleased with his caricature he offered to add his voice free of charge—on the condition that the animators draw him with a little more hair.

Moore also appeared on television on such shows as The Colgate Comedy Hour and So This Is Hollywood alongside former child star Mitzi Green.

== Personal life ==
Moore was married twice: first to actress Emma Littlefield from June 23, 1903, until her death on June 23, 1934, and then to Shirley Paige on January 16, 1942, when Moore was 65 and Paige was 20. The marriage was not publicly announced for more than a year. They remained married until Moore's death 20 years later.

He had three children with his first wife: an adopted son Victor Jr., Ora Victora and Robert Emmett.

Moore was well liked by his colleagues. In 1915, among the actors' colony in Long Island, New York he established a social group called L.I.G.H.T.S. (Long Island Good Hearted Thespians Society), based in Freeport. The membership included many showbusiness notables, including John Philip Sousa, Irving Berlin, Al Jolson, Will Rogers and the Ringling Brothers. Moore noted that people in show business often had to work during the Christmas season, so he instituted annual "Christmas in July" celebrations especially for actors.

Moore campaigned for Republican Thomas E. Dewey during the 1944 presidential election campaign.

Moore died of a heart attack on July 23, 1962. He was 86 years old. He is interred at Cypress Hills Cemetery in Brooklyn, New York.

== Legacy ==
The Victor Moore Bus Terminal and business arcade at the New York City Subway's Roosevelt Avenue / 74th Street station in Jackson Heights, Queens was named for him when it opened in 1941. In 2005, the arcade was replaced by an Intermodal Transportation Complex serving the same subway and bus lines.

== Filmography ==
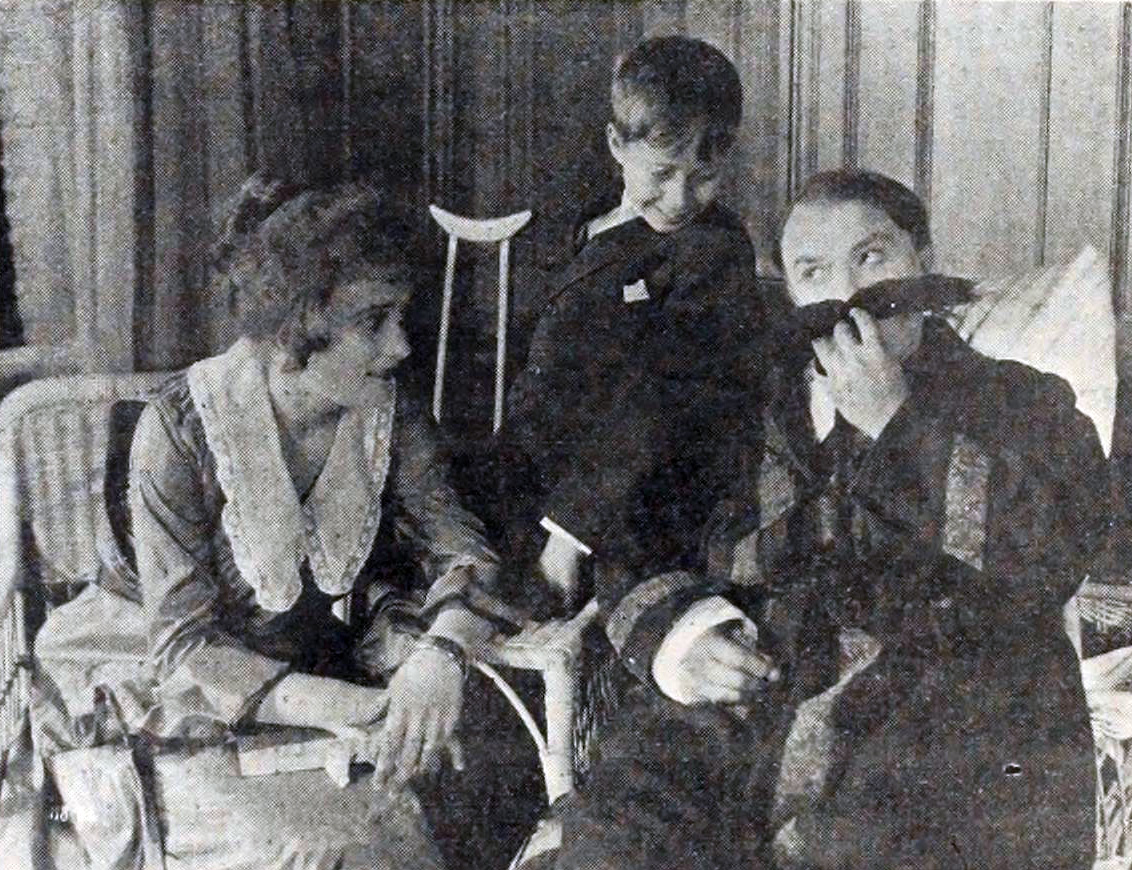
The Clown (1916)

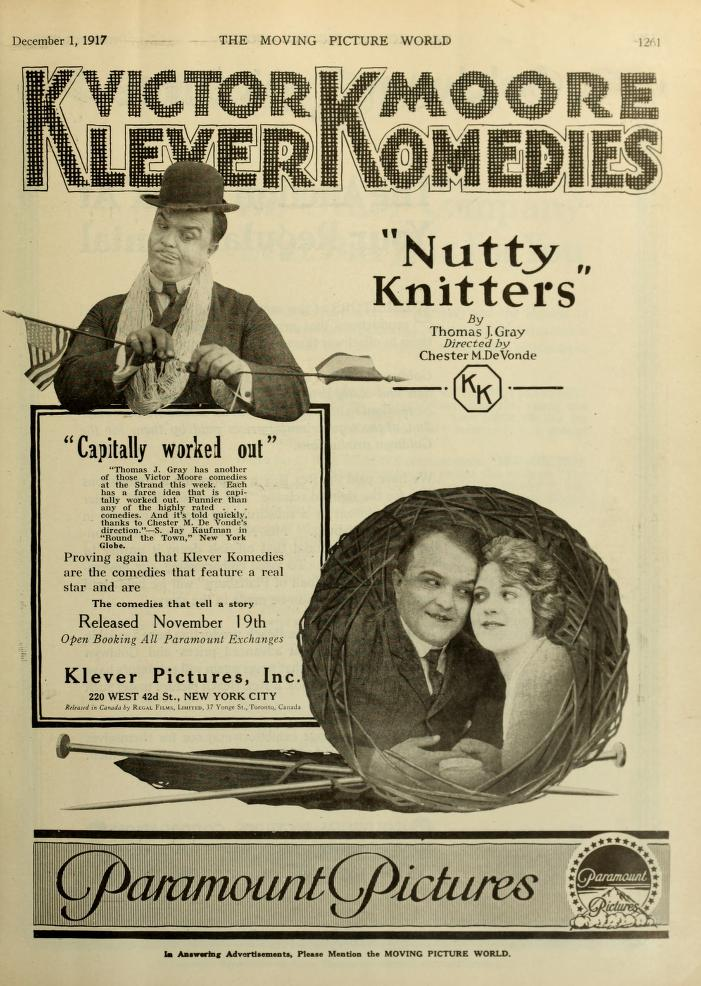
Nutty Knitters (1917)

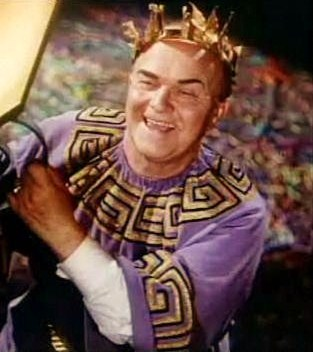
Moore in trailer for Louisiana Purchase (1941)

=== Silent films ===
- Snobs (1915) as Henry Disney
- Chimmie Fadden (1915, Short) as Chimmie Fadden
- Chimmie Fadden Out West (1915) as Chimmie Fadden
- The Race (1916) as Jimmy Grayson Jr.
- The Clown (1916) as Piffle
- The Best Man (1916, Short)
- In Society and Out (1916, Short)
- He Meant Well (1917, Short)
- Did It Ever Happen to You? (1917, Short) as Vic
- The Sleepwalker (1917, Short) as Vic
- He Got There After All (1917, Short) as Vic
- Some Doctor (1917, Short)
- His Military Figure (1917, Short)
- Ballad and Bologna (1917, Short)
- Invited Out (1917, Short)
- Moving (1917, Short)
- Flivvering (1917, Short)
- Community (1917, Short)
- Bungalowing (1917 short)
- Oh, Pop! (1917, Short)
- Camping (1917, Short)
- In Bed-In Bad (1917, Short)
- The Cow Jumped Over the Moon (1917, Short)
- Home Defense (1917, Short)
- Faint Heart and Fair Lady (1917, Short)
- Nutty Knitters (1917, Short)
- Toothaches and Heartaches (1917, Short)
- The Installment Plan (1917, Short)
- The Wrong Mr. Fox (1917, Short) as Jimmy Fox
- Oh! U-Boat (1917, Short)
- Meatless Days and Sleepless Nights (1918, Short)
- He Got His (1918, Short)
- Adam and His Eves (1918, Short)
- The Man Who Found Himself (1925) as Humpty Dumpty Smith

=== Sound films ===
- Dangerous Nan McGrew (1930) as Doc Foster
- Heads Up (1930) as Skippy Dugan
- Love in the Suburbs (1931 short)
- Ladies not Allowed (1932 short)
- Romance in the Rain (1934) as J. Franklyn Blank
- Gift of Gab (1934) as Colonel Horatios Trivers
- Swing Time (1936) as Pop Cardetti
- Gold Diggers of 1937 (1936) as J.J. Hobart
- We're on the Jury (1937) as Mr. J. Clarence 'Pudgy' Beaver
- Make Way for Tomorrow (1937) as Barkley Cooper
- Meet the Missus (1937) as Otis Foster
- The Life of the Party (1937) as Oliver
- She's Got Everything (1937) as Waldo Eddington
- Radio City Revels (1938) as Paul Plummer
- This Marriage Business (1938) as Jud Parker
- Louisiana Purchase (1941) as Sen. Oliver P. Loganberry
- Star Spangled Rhythm (1942) as William "Bronco Billy" Webster
- This Is the Army (1943) as Soldier's Father (uncredited)
- Riding High (1943) as Mortimer J. Slocum
- The Heat's On (1943) as Hubert Bainbridge
- True to Life (1943) as Pop Porter
- Carolina Blues (1944) as Phineas / Elliott / Hiriam / Horatio / Aunt Martha / Aunt Minerva Carver
- It's in the Bag! (1945) as Himself
- Ain't That Ducky (1945 short) as Hunter (uncredited voice)
- Ziegfeld Follies (1945) as Lawyer's Client ('Pay the Two Dollars')
- Duffy's Tavern (1945) as Michael O'Malley
- It Happened on 5th Avenue (1947) as Aloysius T. McKeever
- On Our Merry Way (1948) as Ashton Carrington
- A Kiss in the Dark (1949) as Horace Willoughby
- We're Not Married! (1952) as Justice of the Peace Melvin Bush
- The Seven Year Itch (1955) as Plumber (final film role)

== Radio appearances ==
Year	Program	Episode/source
1944	Amos 'n' Andy	Between Life and Death
1947	Lux Radio Theatre	It's a Wonderful Life
1947	The Jimmy Durante Show	The Presidential Campaign
1948	Hallmark Playhouse	Old Man Minnick
1949	The Fred Allen Show	Mob Buster
