= Ziegfeld Follies (film) =

1945 American musical comedy film

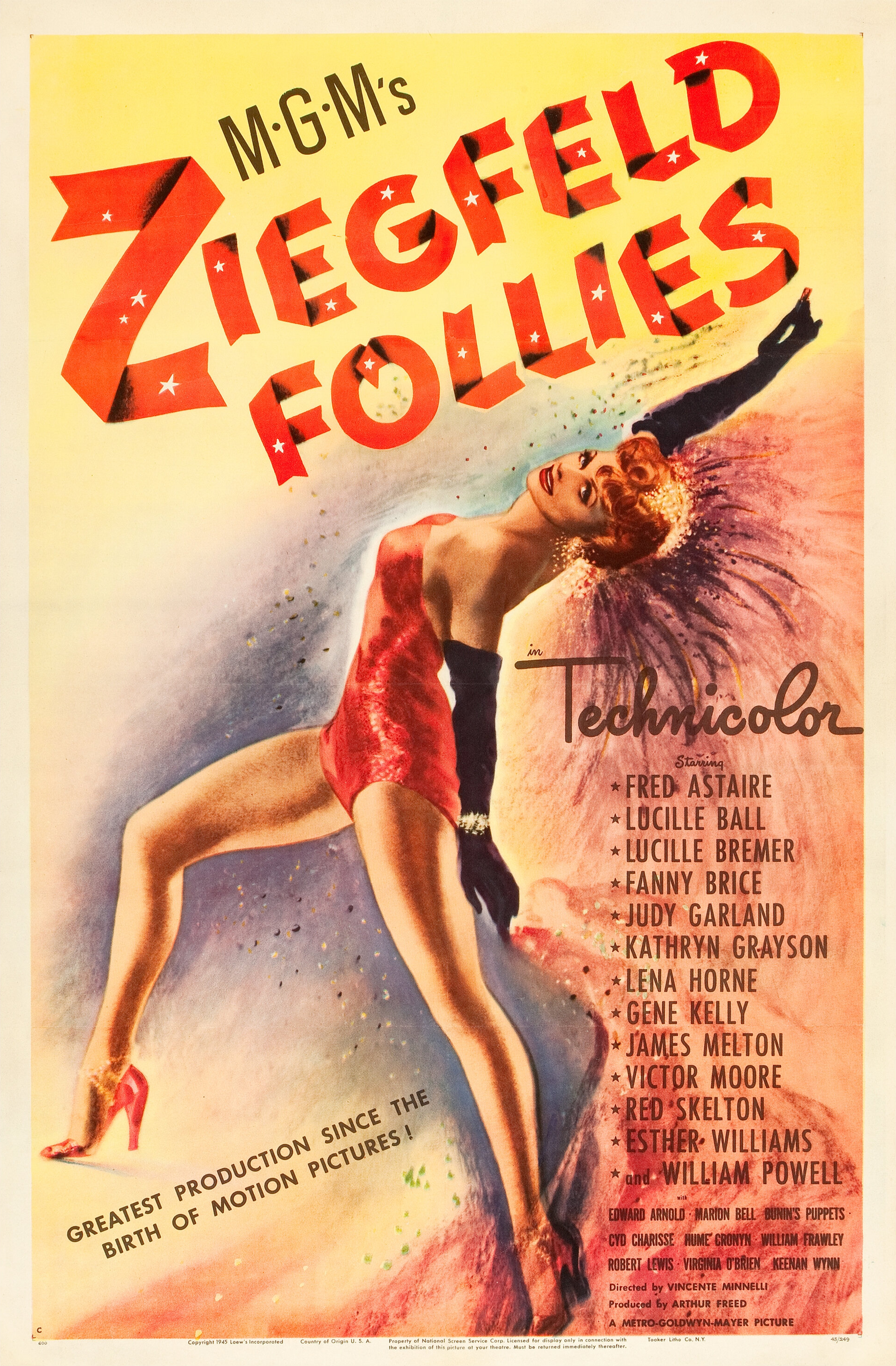
- Theatrical release poster
- Directed by: Lemuel Ayers; Roy Del Ruth; Robert Lewis; Vincente Minnelli; George Sidney
- Written by: Charles Walters
- Produced by: Arthur Freed
- Starring: Fred Astaire; Lucille Ball; Lucille Bremer; Fanny Brice; Judy Garland; Kathryn Grayson; Lena Horne; Gene Kelly; James Melton; Victor Moore; Red Skelton; Esther Williams; William Powell; Edward Arnold; Marion Bell; Cyd Charisse; Hume Cronyn; William Frawley; Robert Lewis; Virginia O'Brien; Keenan Wynn
- Cinematography: George Folsey; Charles Rosher; Ray June (uncredited)
- Edited by: Albert Akst
- Music by: Roger Edens; Lennie Hayton; Conrad Salinger; Harry Warren
- Production company: Metro-Goldwyn-Mayer
- Distributed by: Loew's, Inc.
- Release dates: August 13, 1945 (Boston); July 15, 1946 (United States)
- Running time: 110 minutes
- Country: United States
- Language: English
- Budget: $3,403,000
- Box office: $5,344,000

Ziegfeld Follies is a 1945 American musical comedy film released by Metro-Goldwyn-Mayer (MGM), primarily directed by Vincente Minnelli, with segments directed by Lemuel Ayers, Roy Del Ruth, Robert Lewis, and George Sidney, the film's original director before Minnelli took over. Other directors that are said to have made uncredited contributions to the film are Merrill Pye, Norman Taurog, and Charles Walters. It stars many MGM leading talents, including Fred Astaire, Lucille Ball, Lucille Bremer, Fanny Brice (the only member of the ensemble who was a star of the original Follies), Judy Garland, Kathryn Grayson, Lena Horne, Gene Kelly, James Melton, Victor Moore, William Powell, Red Skelton, and Esther Williams.

Producer Arthur Freed wanted to create a film along the lines of the Ziegfeld Follies Broadway shows, and so the film is composed of a sequence of unrelated lavish musical numbers and comedy sketches. Some of them, such as Pay the Two Dollars, originated in George White's Scandals. Filmed in 1944 and 1945, it was released in 1946 to considerable critical and box-office success.

The film was entered into the 1947 Cannes Film Festival.

== Plot ==
The camera pans over a Heaven somewhere beyond the clouds. The residences of great showmen gone to their eternal reward are shown: Shakespeare, whose home looks like the Globe Theater; P.T.Barnum, whose residence in the afterlife resembles a circus Big Top; and Florenz Ziegfeld, whose home's entrance is reminiscent of the theater where he staged the Ziegfeld Follies on Broadway.

Talking to the audience, Ziegfeld guides the viewers along a wall with three-dimensional paintings or shadow boxes containing dolls that look like the stars he cast in his productions over the years and the audiences who attended them. The film dissolves into a stop-motion puppet sequence (performed by Bunin's Puppets) as Ziegfeld provides a voice-over describing the opening of one of his shows and his subsequent successes.

He steps out onto a balcony, musing how he wishes he could stage just one more Follies, with current and past stars in the cast. A Higher Power responds to his request for writing material, and a long red crayon and a sheet of paper appear. Ziegfeld begins to write. He would open with a pink number, and to introduce the whole thing, his old friend, Fred Astaire. Cut to Astaire's introduction and the song, “Here's to the Beautiful Girls.” The picture never returns to Flo Ziegfeld's Heavenly apartment. After “Beauty” comes “The End”, followed by the then-standard notice “To families and friends of Servicemen and Women…” that films are provided to combat areas around the world, concluding with several minutes of Exit Music.

== Cast ==
In order of appearance, including the titles of their episodes. Character names are rarely provided in the film. There are no end credits identifying roles and performers.

- William Powell as Florenz Ziegfeld Jr. “reprising his role in The Great Ziegfeld”
- Fred Astaire as himself
- Lucille Ball as herself in “Here’s to the Ladies”
- Cyd Charisse as Ballerina in “Here’s to the Ladies”
- Virginia O'Brien as herself singing “Bring on Those Wonderful Men”
- Esther Williams as herself in “ A Water Ballet”
- Keenan Wynn as the caller in “Number Please”
- James Melton as Alfredo in “Traviata”—Singing Libiamo ne' lieti calici.
- Marion Bell as Violetta in “Traviata”—Singing Libiamo ne' lieti calici.
- Victor Moore as Lawyer's Client in "Pay the Two Dollars"
- Edward Arnold as Lawyer in "Pay the Two Dollars"
- Fred Astaire as a jewel thief, in “A Dance Story— This Heart of Mine”
- Lucille Bremer as lovely aristocrat in “This Heart of Mine”
- Fanny Brice as Norma Edelman in "A Sweepstakes Ticket"
- Hume Cronyn as Monty Edelman in "A Sweepstakes Ticket"
- William Frawley as Mr. Martin, the Landlord, in "A Sweepstakes Ticket"
- Lena Horne in a Caribbean bar in “Love”
- Red Skelton in “When Television Comes” portraying two characters on the Guzzler's Gin Program: poet J. Newton Numbskull, and the unfortunate man who does the ads.
- Fred Astaire as man in black in “A dramatic pantomime: Limehouse Blues”
- Lucille Bremer as the woman in yellow in “A dramatic pantomime: Limehouse Blues”
- Judy Garland as the lady in “A Great Lady Has an Interview”
- Fred Astaire as man in “The Babbitt and the Bromide”
- Gene Kelly as man in “The Babbitt and the Bromide”
- Kathryn Grayson as herself, singing “Beauty”
- Cyd Charisse as Ballerina in “Beauty”

== Key songs/dance routines ==
Dance director was Robert Alton, Astaire's second-most-frequent choreographic collaborator after Hermes Pan. All of Astaire's numbers were directed by Vincente Minnelli. The movie's opening featured William Powell as Ziegfeld, who does the prologue.

Most of the scenes have supporting casts and/or choruses not credited in the film.

- "Here's to the Girls/"Bring on those Wonderful Men": by Roger Edens and Arthur Freed and sung by Astaire. A carousel carrying masses of chorus girls wearing masses of pink ostrich feathers, mounted on real horses, serves as a backdrop for a solo dance by Cyd Charisse, followed by Lucille Ball dismounting and cracking a whip over eight chorus-girl panthers. The elaborate production number is followed by Virginia O'Brien, similarly garbed but riding an obviously fake horse, singing the spoof "Bring On Those Wonderful Men". Van Johnson, Fred MacMurray and Mischa Auer are cited in the song as men she finds interesting. Mischa Auer was not a heartthrob: She mentions the shortage of men. At the time the picture was filmed, World War II had not ended, and huge numbers of American men were still serving in the armed forces. At the end, O'Brien breaks the fourth wall and calls to ‘the guy in the third row”.
- In addition to the two principal singers, “Traviata” includes a singing and dancing chorus of men and women. The women are dressed in striking gowns made to resemble butterflies or pieces of butterflies.
- "This Heart of Mine": classic standard by Harry Warren and Arthur Freed and written specially for Astaire who sings it to Bremer and then leads her in an extravagantly romantic dance of seduction and power-play. The choreography integrates rotating floors, concealed treadmills and swirling dance motifs.
- "Love": another standard, this time by Hugh Martin and Ralph Blane, sung by Lena Horne. The setting is in a dive somewhere in the Caribbean.
- "Limehouse Blues": conceived as a "dramatic pantomime" with Astaire as a proud but poverty-stricken Chinese man whose infatuation with the unattainable Bremer leads to tragedy. The story serves as bookends for a dream ballet inspired by Chinese dance motifs in a vast and extravagant setting, as both Astaire and Bremer perform in yellowface.
- "The Great Lady Has an Interview": written by Kay Thompson and Roger Edens originally for Greer Garson (who turned it down). Judy Garland spoofs a movie star, who is typecast in Oscar-winning dramas but wants to play "sexy" roles (à la Ginger Rogers or Betty Grable), giving an interview (in song) to dancing reporters (who also act as a vocal chorus) about "her next picture": a biopic of Madame Crematon (the "inventor of the safety pin"). Originally to be directed by Garland's friend Charles Walters, Vincente Minnelli ended up directing the sequence (the two were dating at the time), and Walters was reassigned as choreographer.
- "The Babbitt and the Bromide": Astaire and Kelly team up in a comedy song and dance challenge in three episodes—taking place in youth, middle age, and in Heaven— to music and lyrics by George and Ira Gershwin. All choreography was by Astaire (third section) and Kelly (first and second sections). This was the only time Astaire and Kelly appeared on screen together in their prime. In spite of efforts by Freed and Minnelli, the two would not partner again on film until That's Entertainment, Part II in 1976.
- "There's Beauty Everywhere": Originally filmed as a balletic finale with tenor James Melton singing and Fred Astaire, Cyd Charisse, and Lucille Bremer dancing in a melange of soap bubbles. But when the bubble machine malfunctioned (leaving only a fragment of the number filmed) and the soap formula flowed into the hallways of the soundstage, the number had to be restaged, and the Astaire and Bremer sequence was cut out altogether. Kathryn Grayson replaced Melton. Segments of the "bubble dance" with Charisse remain in the final film, at the beginning of the piece. Some three dozen beauties in gold lamé gowns decorate the final stage. Ziegfeld Follies in lights appears behind Grayson.

== Surviving outtake of introduction ==
An early concept was to have the film introduced by a stop motion animated puppet of Leo the Lion. Although cut before release, this outtake footage survives today.

== Reception ==
The New York Times: "The film's best numbers are a couple of comedy skits, especially one done by Red Skelton. Fanny Brice plays a Bronx hausfrau quite funnily. Judy Garland is also amusing as a movie queen giving an interview. Ziegfeld Follies is entertaining – and that's what it's meant to be!" (Bosley Crowther).

Newsweek: "At least three of the numbers would highlight any review on stage and screen. In A Great Lady has an Interview, Judy Garland, with six leading men, displays an unexpected flair for occupational satire. With Numbers Please Keenan Wynn demonstrates, once again, that he is one of Hollywood's foremost comedians. But the dance act for the archives is The Babbitt and the Bromide Fred Astaire and Gene Kelly trade taps and double-takes to a photo finish."

The Babbitt and the Bromide is referenced in a cutaway gag in season 10 episode of Family Guy, when Peter Griffin, Quagmire, and Joe perform a section of the musical, called a "white guy work song" while in a chain gang as a reaction to the black prisoners having their own work song.

== Box office ==
According to MGM records, the film earned $3,569,000 in the US and Canada, and $1,775,000 elsewhere - but because of its enormous cost, it incurred a loss to the studio of $269,000.

== Accolades ==
1947 Cannes Film Festival Best Musical Comedy (Prix de la meilleure comédie musicale) Won

The film is recognized by American Film Institute in these lists:

- 2006: AFI's Greatest Movie Musicals – Nominated
