= The Clown (1916 film) =

1916 film by William Churchill deMille

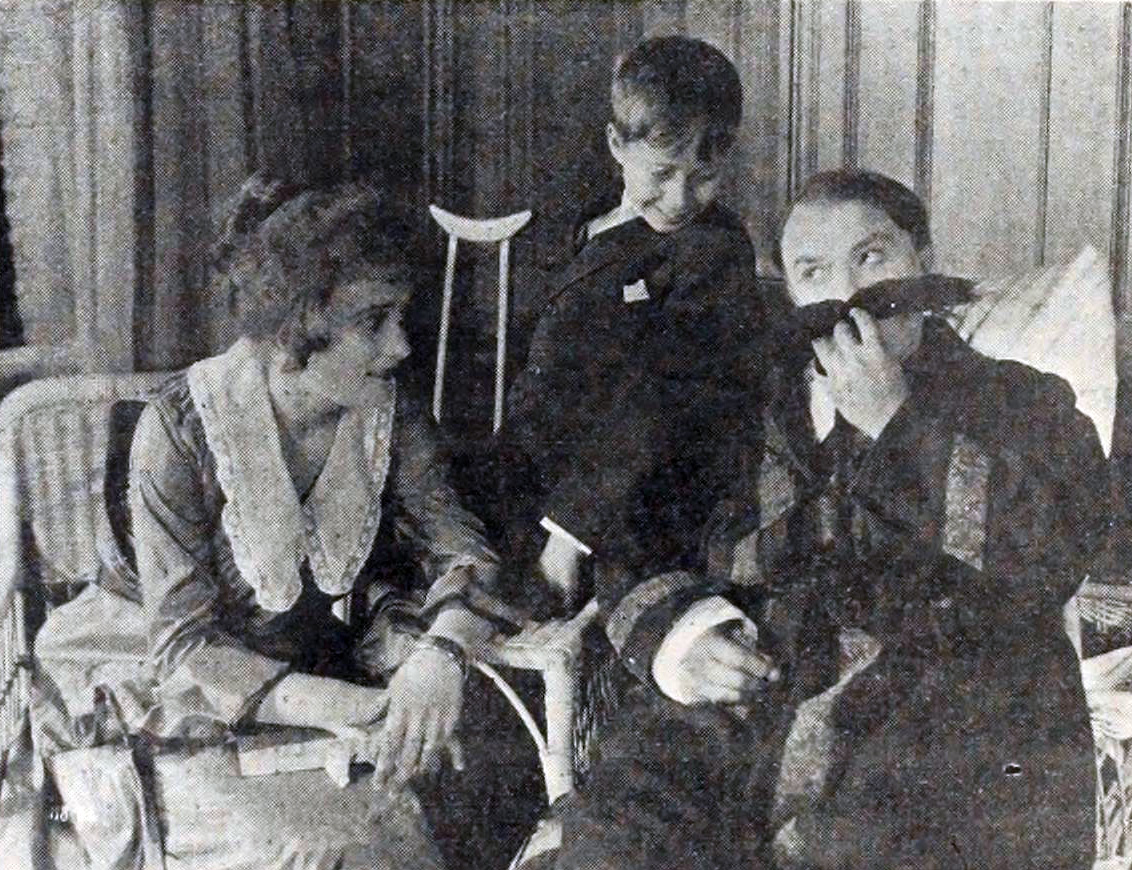
- Still from a magazine
- Directed by: William C. deMille
- Written by: Marion Fairfax
- Produced by: Jesse Lasky
- Starring: Victor Moore
- Cinematography: Charles Rosher
- Distributed by: Paramount Pictures
- Release date: June 19, 1916
- Running time: 5 reels
- Country: United States
- Language: Silent (English intertitles)

The Clown is a lost 1916 American silent drama film starring stage star Victor Moore and directed by William C. deMille. It was produced by Jesse Lasky and distributed by Paramount Pictures.

== Plot summary ==
Piffle, a circus clown, is badly injured following his daring rescue of Judge Jonathan Le Roy's son from a team of bolting horses.

During his recovery, Piffle meets Millicent, the judge's daughter, who he falls in love with. Millicent, however, cannot love Piffle; her heart belongs to the father of her unborn child, Dick Ordway. Upon learning of Odway’s supposed demise in the desert, Millicent attempts suicide by drowning.

Piffle saves Millicent, proposing to marry her and offering to step into the role of father to her child. Desperate, Millicent accepts his offer. Her father, Judge Le Roy, insists Piffle leave circus life in order to take up the more respectable role of a banker.

The alive Dick Ordway returns to the fold following the unexpected financial success of his desert mine. Ordway attempts to buy back his shares, but Piffle, now a banker, refuses to sell to him. This leads Ordway back to the Le Roy household where he reunites with Millicent. Piffle realises that Millicent and Ordway are still in love and decides to step aside for her sake.

Piffle returns to the circus, where he finds true joy, not in the pursuit of love, but in bringing happiness to children.

== Cast ==
- Victor Moore as Piffle
- Thomas Meighan as Dick Ordway
- Ernest Joy as Judge Jonathan Le Roy
- Florence Dagmar as Millicent, His Daughter
- Gerald Ward as Jackie, His Son
- Tom Forman as Bob Hunter
- Horace B. Carpenter as Circus Manager
- Wallace Pyke as Rollo
- Billy Jacobs as Jonathan Le Roy Fox
