= Winning Way =

Winning Way(s) may refer to:

- Her Winning Way, 1921 lost American silent comedy film
- The Winning Way (film), British title for 1953 American drama All American
- The Winning Way, productions since 1979 by Canadian-American director David Winning
- Winning Ways for Your Mathematical Plays, 1982 British-American book compiling mathematical games
- The Winning Way, 2011 Indian book detailing sporting values in cricket
