= Lucien Littlefield =

American actor (1895–1960)

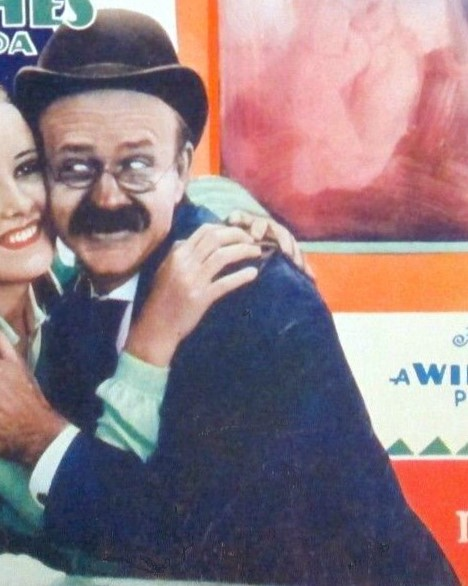
- Littlefield on the lobby card for Heart to Heart (1928)
- Born: August 16, 1895; San Antonio, Texas, U.S.
- Died: June 4, 1960 (aged 64); Hollywood, California, U.S.
- Resting place: Forest Lawn Memorial Park Cemetery, Glendale, California
- Education: Staunton Military Academy
- Occupation: Actor
- Years active: 1914–1960
- Spouse: Constance Palmer (m. 1925)

Lucien Littlefield (August 16, 1895 – June 4, 1960) was an American actor who achieved a long career from silent films to the television era. He was noted for his versatility, playing a wide range of roles and already portraying old men before he was of voting age.

== Life and career ==
Lucien Littlefield was born in San Antonio, Texas and attended Staunton Military Academy. He started his movie career in 1913 and worked as an actor until his death in 1960. He usually portrayed comedic supporting characters, often much older than himself. His role of the doctor in The Cat and the Canary (1927) is one of his more notable performances. The character actor appeared with Laurel and Hardy, first as an eccentric professor in Dirty Work and finally as a veterinarian in Sons of the Desert, both made in 1933. He also played Mary Pickford's father in My Best Girl in 1927. Other roles include the western Tumbleweeds with William S. Hart, the comedy Ruggles of Red Gap with Charles Laughton, and Johnny Come Lately with James Cagney.

He played an eccentric inventor in an early episode of Adventures of Superman titled "The Runaway Robot". Littlefield played many character roles in other TV shows of the 1950s, such as Blondie, Lassie, Dragnet and Peter Gunn.

He died of natural causes in 1960 at a veterans' hospital in Hollywood, California, and he was buried in Glendale's Forest Lawn Memorial Park Cemetery.

== Selected filmography ==
- Rose of the Rancho (1914) (uncredited)
- The Ghost Breaker (1914) as Judge Jarvis
- The Warrens of Virginia (1915) as Tom Dabney
- A Gentleman of Leisure (1915) as Clerk
- The Wild Goose Chase (1915, short) as The 'Grind'
- Kindling (1915) as Fence (uncredited)
- The Marriage of Kitty (1915) as Minor Role
- Mr. Grex of Monte Carlo (1915) as The Rag Picker
- The Unknown (1915) as Minor Role
- The Cheat (1915) as Hardy's Secretary (uncredited)
- The Golden Chance (1915) as Roger Manning's Valet (uncredited)
- Temptation (1915) (uncredited)
- The Blacklist (1916) as Frederick Holtz
- To Have and to Have (1916) as King James I
- The Love Mask (1916)
- The Heart of Nora Flynn (1916) as The Gardener
- A Gutter Magdalene (1916)
- Joan the Woman (1916)
- The Golden Fetter (1917) as Pete
- On Record (1917)
- The Cost of Hatred (1917)
- The Jaguar's Claws (1917) as Minor Role
- The Squaw Man's Son (1917) as Lord Yester
- The Hostage (1917) as Paul
- Hawthorne of the U.S.A. (1919) as Soldier on Patrol (uncredited)
- Everywoman (1919) as Lord Witness
- Double Speed (1920) as Reginald Toby
- Why Change Your Wife? (1920) as Gordon's Butler
- Jack Straw (1920) as Sherlo
- Sick Abed (1920) as Dr. Widner
- The Sins of St. Anthony (1920) as Lieutenant Humphrey Smith
- The Fourteenth Man (1920) as Wesley Colfax Winslow
- The Round-Up (1920) as Parenthesis (uncredited)
- Eyes of the Heart (1920) as Whitey
- Her First Elopement (1920) as Man with Raccoon Coat (uncredited)
- The Furnace (1920) as Bert Vallance
- Her First Elopement (1920) as Ted Maitland
- All Souls' Eve (1921)
- The Little Clown (1921) as Connie Potts
- Too Much Speed (1921) as Jimmy Rodman
- Crazy to Marry (1921) as Minister
- The Hell Diggers (1921) as Silas Hoskins
- The Affairs of Anatol (1921) as Spencer's Valet (uncredited)
- The Sheik (1921) as Gaston – French Valet
- Rent Free (1922) as 'Batty' Briggs
- Tillie (1922) as Doc Weaver
- Saturday Night (1922) as Uncle Van's Secretary (uncredited)
- Her Husband's Trademark (1922) as Slithy Winters
- Across the Continent (1922) as Scott Tyler
- Beyond the Rocks (1922) as Sir Lionel Grey's Associate (uncredited)
- Our Leading Citizen (1922) as The Editor
- The Siren Call (1922) as Irishman
- Manslaughter (1922) as Witness
- To Have and to Hold (1922) as Duke of Buckingham
- Mr. Billings Spends His Dime (1923) as Martin Green
- The Tiger's Claw (1923) as Goyrem
- Three Wise Fools (1923) as Douglas
- The French Doll (1923) as Dobbs, the Butler
- In the Palace of the King (1923) as Adonis
- The Rendezvous (1923) as Commissar
- Leap Year (1924) as Jeremiah Piper
- Name the Man (1924) as Sharf
- True As Steel (1924) as Mr. Foote
- Babbitt (1924) as Edward Littlefield
- A Woman Who Sinned (1924) as Rev. Hillburn
- Never Say Die (1924) as Griggs
- The Painted Lady (1924) as Matt Logan
- Feet of Clay (1924) as Minor Role (uncredited)
- Gerald Cranston's Lady (1924) as Stanley Tilotson
- Teeth (1924) as Under-sheriff
- Gold Heels (1924) as Push Miller
- The Deadwood Coach (1924) as Charlie Winter – in play
- Charley's Aunt (1925) as Brasset – the Scout
- Gold and the Girl (1925) as Weasel
- The Rainbow Trail (1925) as Joe Lake
- What Price Goofy? (1925, Short) as Speck – Jamison's Faithful Butler
- Hearts and Spurs (1925) as Ford Driver (uncredited)
- Innocent Husbands (1925, Short) as The House Detective
- Madame Sans Jane (1925, Short) as Steward
- There Goes the Bride (1925, Short)
- Somewhere in Somewhere (1925, Short) as The Buck Private
- Laughing Ladies (1925, Short) as The Dentist
- Tumbleweeds (1925) as Kentucky Rose
- Soul Mates (1925) as Stevens
- A Punch in the Nose (1926, Short)
- Your Husband's Past (1926, Short)
- Torrent (1926) as Cupido
- Brooding Eyes (1926) as Bell
- Tony Runs Wild (1926) as Red
- Bachelor Brides (1926) as Egbert Beamish
- Don Key (Son of Burro) (1926, Short)
- Take It from Me (1926) as Cyrus Crabb
- Twinkletoes (1926) as Hank
- Taxi! Taxi! (1927) as Billy Wallace
- The Cat and the Canary (1927) as Ira Lazar
- The Lighter That Failed (1927, Short) (uncredited)
- My Best Girl (1927) as Pa Johnson
- Uncle Tom's Cabin (1927) as Lawyer Marks
- The Small Bachelor (1927)
- Cheating Cheaters (1927) as 'Habeas Corpus' Lazarre
- The Valley of the Giants (1927) as Councilman
- A Texas Steer (1927) as Yell
- A Ship Comes In (1928) as Dan Casey
- The Man in Hobbles (1928) as Pa Harris
- A Blonde for a Night (1928) as Jenks
- Harold Teen (1928) as Dad Jenks
- The Head Man (1928) as Ed Barnes
- Heart to Heart (1928) as Uncle Joe Boyd
- Mother Knows Best (1928) as Pa Quail
- Do Your Duty (1928) as Andy McIntosh
- Making the Grade (1929) as Silas Cooper
- Clear the Decks (1929) as Plinge
- Saturday's Children (1929) as Willie
- This Is Heaven (1929) as Frank Chase
- The Girl in the Glass Cage (1929) as Sheik Smith
- Drag (1929) as Pa Parker
- Dark Streets (1929) as Census Taker
- The Great Divide (1929) as Texas Tommy
- Happy Days (1929) as Lucien Littlefield
- Seven Keys to Baldpate (1929) as Thomas Hayden
- No No Nanette (1930) as Jim Smith
- Getting a Raise (1930, Short) as Pa Potter
- Clancy in Wall Street (1930) as Andy MacIntosh
- High Society Blues (1930) as Eli Granger
- Big Money (1930, Short) as Pa Potter
- She's My Weakness (1930) as Warren Thurber
- Tom Sawyer (1930) as Schoolteacher
- Reducing (1931) as Elmer Truffle
- Scandal Sheet (1931) as Charles McCloskey
- It Pays to Advertise (1931) as Adams
- Misbehaving Ladies (1931) as Uncle Joe Boyd
- Young as You Feel (1931) as Noah Marley
- Trouble from Abroad (1931, Short) as Captain Wimble
- The Great Junction Hotel (1931, Short)
- Broken Lullaby (1932) as Herr Walter Schultz
- Strangers in Love (1932) as Professor Clark
- Are You Listening? (1932) as Fred (uncredited)
- Shopworn (1932) as Fred
- Strangers of the Evening (1932) as Frank 'Snookie' Daniels aka Richard Roe
- Jimmy's New Yacht (1932, Short) as Mr. Ford
- Miss Pinkerton (1932) as Henderson (scenes deleted)
- Speed Madness (1932) as Forbes
- Downstairs (1932) as Françoise – a Drunken Servant
- Devil and the Deep (1932) as Shopkeeper (uncredited)
- That's My Boy (1932) as Uncle Louie
- Pride of the Legion (1932) as 'Dad' Tully
- Evenings for Sale (1932) as Schwenk
- If I Had a Million (1932) as Zeb – Hamburger Stand Owner (uncredited)
- Rasputin and the Empress (1932) as Reveler at Party (uncredited)
- The Bitter Tea of General Yen (1932) as Mr. Jacobson
- That's My Baby (1932)
- Sailor's Luck (1933) as Elmer Brown
- Sweepings (1933) as Grimson
- Professional Sweetheart (1933) as Ed – the Announcer
- The Big Brain (1933) as Justice of the Peace
- Skyway (1933) as Webster
- Chance at Heaven (1933) as Fred Harris
- Dirty Work (1933, Short) as Professor Noodle (uncredited)
- East of Fifth Avenue (1933) as Gardner
- Rainbow Over Broadway (1933) as Timothy Chibbins
- Sons of the Desert (1933) as Dr. Horace Meddick, the Veterinarian
- Alice in Wonderland (1933; scene deleted)
- Mandalay (1934) as Mr. George Peters
- Stand Up and Cheer! (1934) as Professor Hi De Ho (uncredited)
- Thirty Day Princess (1934) as Parker
- Marrying Widows (1934) as The Brother-In-Law
- Kiss and Make-Up (1934) as Max Pascal
- When Strangers Meet (1934) as Barney Crane
- Gridiron Flash (1934) as L.B. Fields
- Love Time (1934) as Willie Obenbiegler
- Sweepstake Annie (1935) as Henry Foster
- Carnival (1935) as Minor Role (uncredited)
- Ruggles of Red Gap (1935) as Charles Belknap-Jackson
- One Frightened Night (1935) as Dr. Denham
- The Murder Man (1935) as Peter J. Rafferty
- Man on the Flying Trapeze (1935) as Mr. Peabody
- She Gets Her Man (1935) as Elmer
- The Return of Peter Grimm (1935) as Colonel Tom Lawton
- Cappy Ricks Returns (1935) as Skinner
- I Dream Too Much (1935) as Hubert Dilley
- Magnificent Obsession (1935) as Breezy (uncredited)
- Strike Me Pink (1936) as Professor Kittridge (uncredited)
- Rose Marie (1936) as Storekeeper
- The Moon's Our Home (1936) as Ogden Holbrook
- Let's Sing Again (1936) as Supt. Henry Perkins
- Early to Bed (1936) as Mr. O'Leary
- Hotel Haywire (1937) as Elmer (uncredited)
- Wild Money (1937) as Bill Hawkins
- High, Wide, and Handsome (1937) as Mr. Lippincott
- Souls at Sea (1937) as Toymaker
- Partners in Crime (1937) as Mr. Twitchell
- Born to the West (1937) as Cattle Buyer
- Bulldog Drummond's Revenge (1937) as Mr. Smith
- Wells Fargo (1937) as San Francisco Postmaster (uncredited)
- Scandal Street (1938) as Robert Johnson
- Hollywood Stadium Mystery (1938) as Watchman
- Reckless Living (1938) as Lucius Carr (uncredited)
- Wide Open Faces (1938) as P. T. 'Doc' Williams
- The Gladiator (1938) as Professor Abner Danner
- I Am the Law (1938) as Mr. Roberts (uncredited)
- The Night Hawk (1938) as Parrish
- Pirates of the Skies (1939) as Dr. Amos Pettingill
- Mystery Plane (1939) as Winslow
- Unmarried (1939) as School Principal (uncredited)
- What a Life (1939) as Mr. Patterson
- Sabotage (1939) as Eli
- Jeepers Creepers (1939) as Grandpa
- Money to Burn (1939) as Irving
- Those Were the Days! (1940) as Professor Sillicocks
- The Westerner (1940) as The Stranger
- Life with Henry (1940) as Mr. Stevens
- Li'l Abner (1940) as The Sheriff / Mr. Oldtimer
- Murder Among Friends (1941) as Dr. Fred Turk
- The Great American Broadcast (1941) as Justice of the Peace
- The Little Foxes (1941) as Manders
- Man at Large (1941) as Jones, Nervous Man at Tourist Camp
- Henry Aldrich for President (1941) as Mr. Crosley
- Mr. and Mrs. North (1942) as Barnes
- Castle in the Desert (1942) as Gleason
- This Time for Keeps (1942) as Herb – Western Union Man (uncredited)
- Larceny, Inc. (1942) as Third Customer (uncredited)
- The Great Man's Lady (1942) as City Editor
- Hillbilly Blitzkrieg (1942) as Prof. Waldo James
- Bells of Capistrano (1942) as Daniel (Pop) McCracken
- Whistling in Dixie (1942) as Corporal Lucken
- Silent Witness (1943) as Hank Eastman
- Henry Aldrich Gets Glamour (1943) as Mr. Quid (uncredited)
- Johnny Come Lately (1943) as Blaker
- Henry Aldrich Haunts a House (1943) as Mr. Quid
- Casanova in Burlesque (1944) as John Alden Compton
- Lady, Let's Dance (1944) as Mr. Snodgrass
- Cowboy and the Senorita (1944) as Judge Loomis
- Goodnight, Sweetheart (1944) as Collins
- When the Lights Go on Again (1944) as Andy
- One Body Too Many (1944) as Kenneth Hopkins
- Lady, Let's Dance (1944) as The Judge
- Zorro's Black Whip (1944) as 'Tenpoint' Jackson
- Scared Stiff (1945) as Charles Waldeck / Preston Waldeck
- The Caribbean Mystery (1945) as Dr. Praskins (uncredited)
- In Old Sacramento (1946) as Barber (uncredited)
- Rendezvous with Annie (1946) as Ed Kramer
- That Brennan Girl (1946) as The Florist
- Love Laughs at Andy Hardy (1946) as Telegraph Clerk (uncredited)
- The Hal Roach Comedy Carnival (1947) as The Judge, in 'Fabulous Joe'
- The Fabulous Joe (1947) as Judge
- Sweet Genevieve (1947) as Mr. Rogers
- Lightnin' in the Forest (1947) as Joad
- Jinx Money (1948) as Tipper
- Hollow Triumph (1948) as Mr. Davis (uncredited)
- Let's Live a Little (1948) as Mr. Tinker (uncredited)
- Bad Men of Tombstone (1949) as Old Man in Claims Office (uncredited)
- Susanna Pass (1949) as Russell Masters
- At Sword's Point (1952) as Cpl. Gautier (uncredited)
- Woman of the North Country (1952) as Parvin (uncredited)
- Roar of the Crowd (1953) as Josh (uncredited)
- Casanova's Big Night (1954) as First Prisoner
- Sudden Danger (1955) as Dave Glennon
- Bop Girl Goes Calypso (1957) as Prof. Winthrop
- The High Cost of Loving (1958) as Brabin (uncredited)
- Wink of an Eye (1958) as Old Man
