= Geraldine (1929 film) =

1929 film directed by Melville Brown

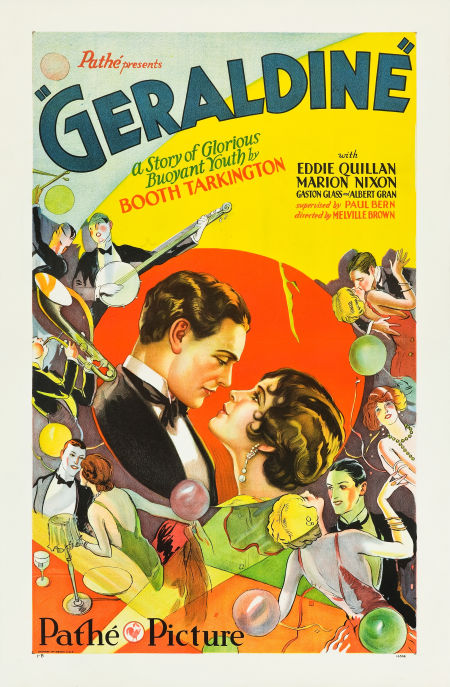
- Film poster
- Directed by: Melville Brown
- Screenplay by: Carey Wilson
- Based on: a novel by Booth Tarkington
- Produced by: Paul Bern
- Starring: Marian Nixon; Eddie Quillan; Albert Gran
- Cinematography: David Abel
- Edited by: Barbara Hunter
- Production company: Pathé Exchange
- Release date: January 20, 1929 (US)
- Running time: 80 minutes
- Country: United States
- Language: English

Geraldine is a 1929 American romantic comedy film, directed by Melville Brown. It stars Marian Nixon, Eddie Quillan, and Albert Gran, and was released on January 20, 1929.

== Plot ==
Eddie Buel is a carefree young man who lives by his wits. In search of employment, he unexpectedly lands a job with John P. Wygate, a wealthy businessman and devoted father. Wygate’s daughter, Geraldine, is deeply in love with Bellsworthy “Bell” Cameron, a stylish young lawyer and notorious heartbreaker. Unfortunately for her, Bell is indifferent; Geraldine, sweet but lacking in polish and sophistication, fails to attract his attention.

Hoping to help his daughter, Wygate hires Eddie to guide Geraldine socially—to teach her how to dress, dance, and carry herself like a true belle. But as Eddie undertakes his task, he finds himself falling in love with Geraldine. Even so, he devotes himself to her happiness, believing it lies in winning Bell. Under his coaching, Geraldine blossoms, gaining confidence and charm.

One evening Eddie takes Geraldine to a café, knowing Bell has broken a date with her to join a lively party of friends. There, Bell is surprised and smitten by Geraldine’s transformation. Following Eddie’s advice, she pretends indifference, entering a dance contest with Eddie instead. They win the cup, and the party at Bell’s table invites them over. In a show of admiration, Bell proposes a toast to Geraldine with the loving cup.

Unaware the drink is alcoholic, Geraldine accepts—and soon becomes tipsy. Eddie, alarmed, tries to persuade her to leave, but she resists. Bell knocks Eddie aside, takes Geraldine’s arm, and plies her with more affection and another drink. Bruised and heartsick, Eddie realizes he has succeeded too well in his plan—Bell now desires Geraldine.

The night takes a disastrous turn when the café is raided. An officer questions Geraldine, who still holds the cup, and places her under arrest. Geraldine turns to Bell for help, but he refuses, unwilling to risk scandal. Eddie, however, proves himself loyal. In the chaos he extinguishes the lights and helps Geraldine escape through a porthole. But as he follows, the lights flare on and he is caught. When the officer calls Geraldine’s name from the arrest list, Eddie dons a woman’s coat and hat, claiming to be Geraldine Wygate. From outside, the real Geraldine sees his selfless sacrifice.

Eddie is jailed—ironically, in the women’s ward—and is utterly miserable. Meanwhile, Geraldine hurries to the jail, insisting she is the real Geraldine Wygate. The sergeant, thinking she is drunk, locks her up as well. Inside the ward she finds Eddie, who is stunned but overjoyed. In that moment Geraldine’s love for him awakens; she rushes into his arms, realizing at last the true worth beneath his carefree exterior.

== Cast ==
- Marian Nixon as Geraldine
- Eddie Quillan as Eddie Able
- Albert Gran as Mr. Wygate
- Gaston Glass as Bell Cameron

== Music ==
The theme song for the film was entitled "Geraldine" and was composed by Charles Tobias and El Kay. Also featured on the soundtrack is the song entitled "Peculiar" which was composed by Paul Corbell, Larry Yoell and Nat Gouldstein.

== Preservation ==
Prints of Geraldine are preserved in the French archive Centre national du cinéma et de l'image animée in Fort de Bois-d'Arcy and the Danish Film Institute.

== See also ==
- List of early sound feature films (1926–1929)
