= Everywoman (film) =

1919 film by George Melford

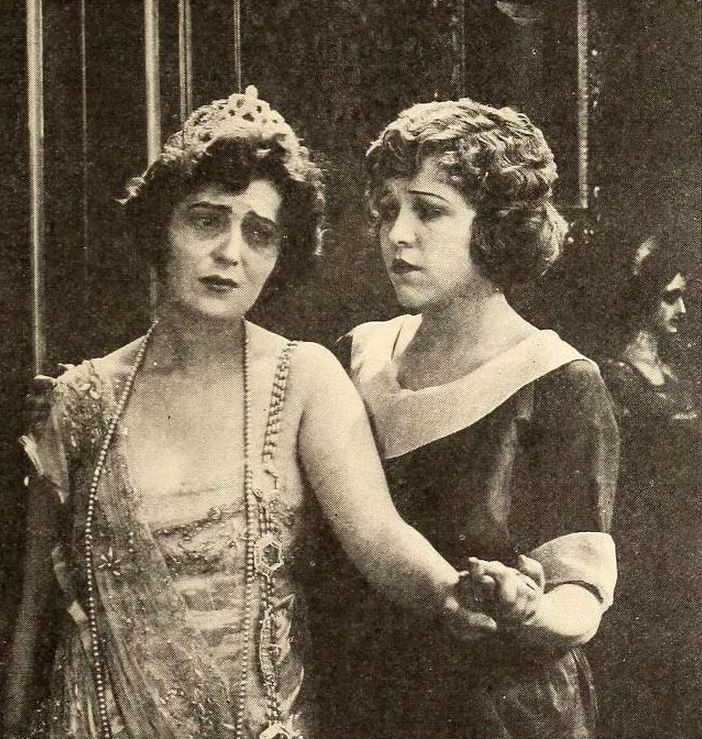
- Still with Violet Heming and Mildred Reardon
- Directed by: George Melford; W. N. Sherer
- Written by: Will M. Ritchey; Walter Browne
- Based on: Everywoman by Walter Browne (play)
- Produced by: Adolph Zukor; Jesse Lasky
- Cinematography: Paul Perry; Loren Taylor
- Distributed by: Paramount Pictures
- Release date: December 30, 1919
- Running time: 7 reels
- Country: United States
- Language: Silent (English intertitles)

Everywoman is a lost 1919 American silent film allegory film directed by George Melford based on a 1911 play Everywoman by Walter Browne. Violet Heming appears as the title character supported by several Paramount character stars.

== Cast ==
- Theodore Roberts as Wealth
- Violet Heming as Everywoman
- Clara Horton as Youth
- Wanda Hawley as Beauty
- Margaret Loomis as Modesty
- Mildred Reardon as Conscience
- Edythe Chapman as Truth
- Bebe Daniels as Vice
- Monte Blue as Love
- Irving Cummings as Passion
- James Neill as Nobody
- Raymond Hatton as Flattery
- Lucien Littlefield as Lord Witness
- Noah Beery as Bluff
- Jay Dwiggins as Stuff
- Tully Marshall as Puff
- Robert Brower as Age
- Charles Stanton Ogle as Time
- Fred Huntley as Dissipation
- Clarence Geldart as Auctioneer

== See also ==
- Experience (1921)
