= Viora Daniel =

American actress

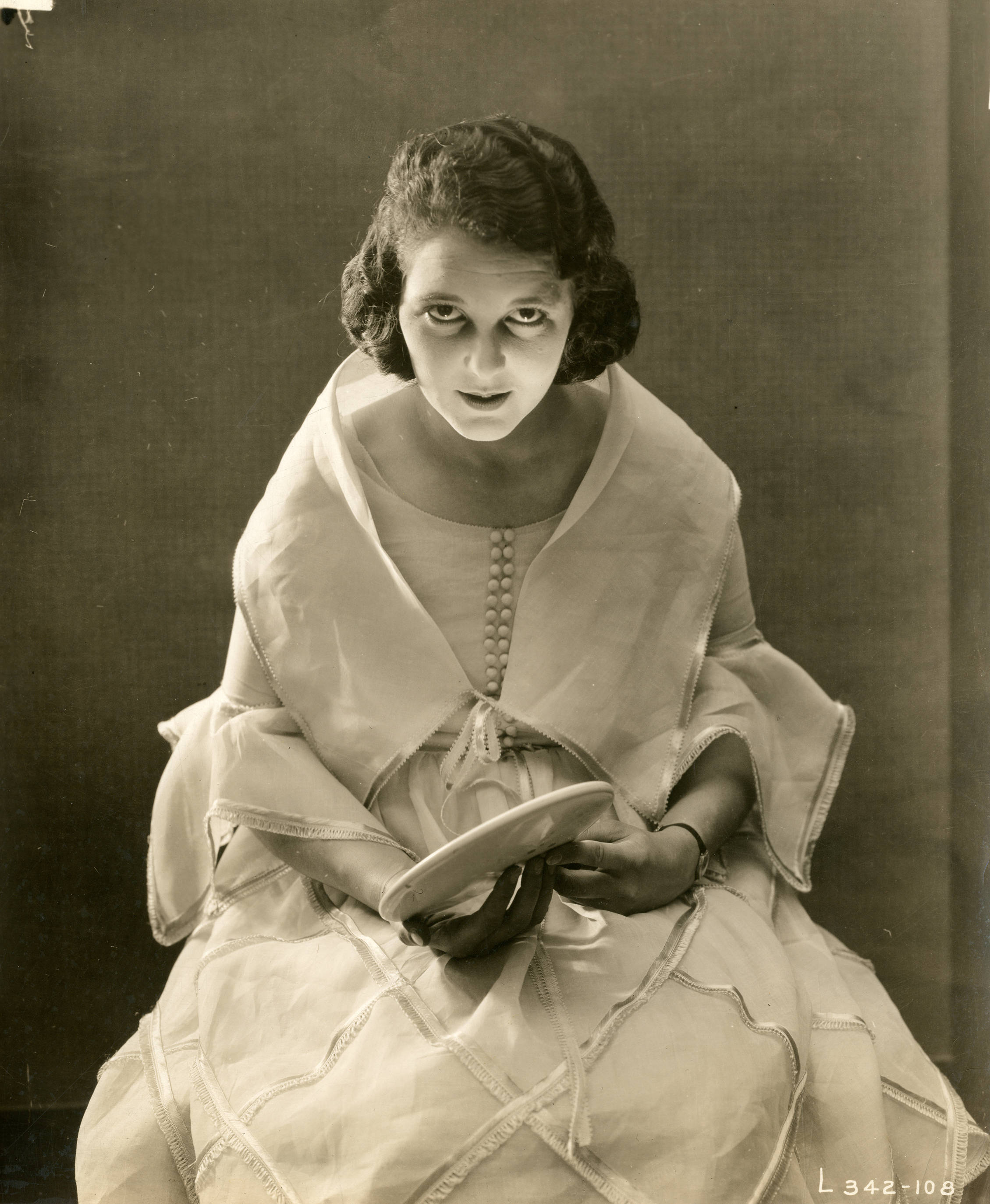
- Publicity still for the 1920 film Life of the Party
- Born: January 24, 1902; Coeur d'Alene, Idaho, U. S.
- Died: May 9, 1980 (aged 78); Los Angeles, California, U. S.
- Occupation: Actress
- Years active: 1920–1927 (film)

Viora Daniel (1902–1980) was an American film actress of the silent era. She appeared in around twenty films, including several shorts, in a mixture of lead and supporting roles.

== Early years ==
Daniel was born in Coeur d'Alene, Idaho, and moved with her parents to Portland, Oregon, when she was five years old. After attending a private school for girls, she attended Oregon Agricultural College, but she left there to seek a career in acting.

== Career ==
Daniel worked for Lasky Studios and Al Christie.

== Selected filmography ==
- The Fourteenth Man (1920)
- Young Mrs. Winthrop (1920)
- The Sins of St. Anthony (1920)
- Life of the Party (1920)
- Thou Art the Man (1920)
- Be My Wife (1921)
- The Easy Road (1921)
- Saturday Night (1922)
- The Cowboy and the Lady (1922)
- Old Shoes (1925)
- Bulldog Pluck (1927)
- One Chance in a Million (1927)
- Quarantined Rivals (1927)

== Bibliography ==
- Foster, Charles. Stardust and Shadows: Canadians in Early Hollywood. Dundurn, 2000.
- Massa, Steve. Slapstick Divas: The Women of Silent Comedy. BearManor Media, 2017.
