= Bell Boy 13 =

1923 film directed by William A. Seiter

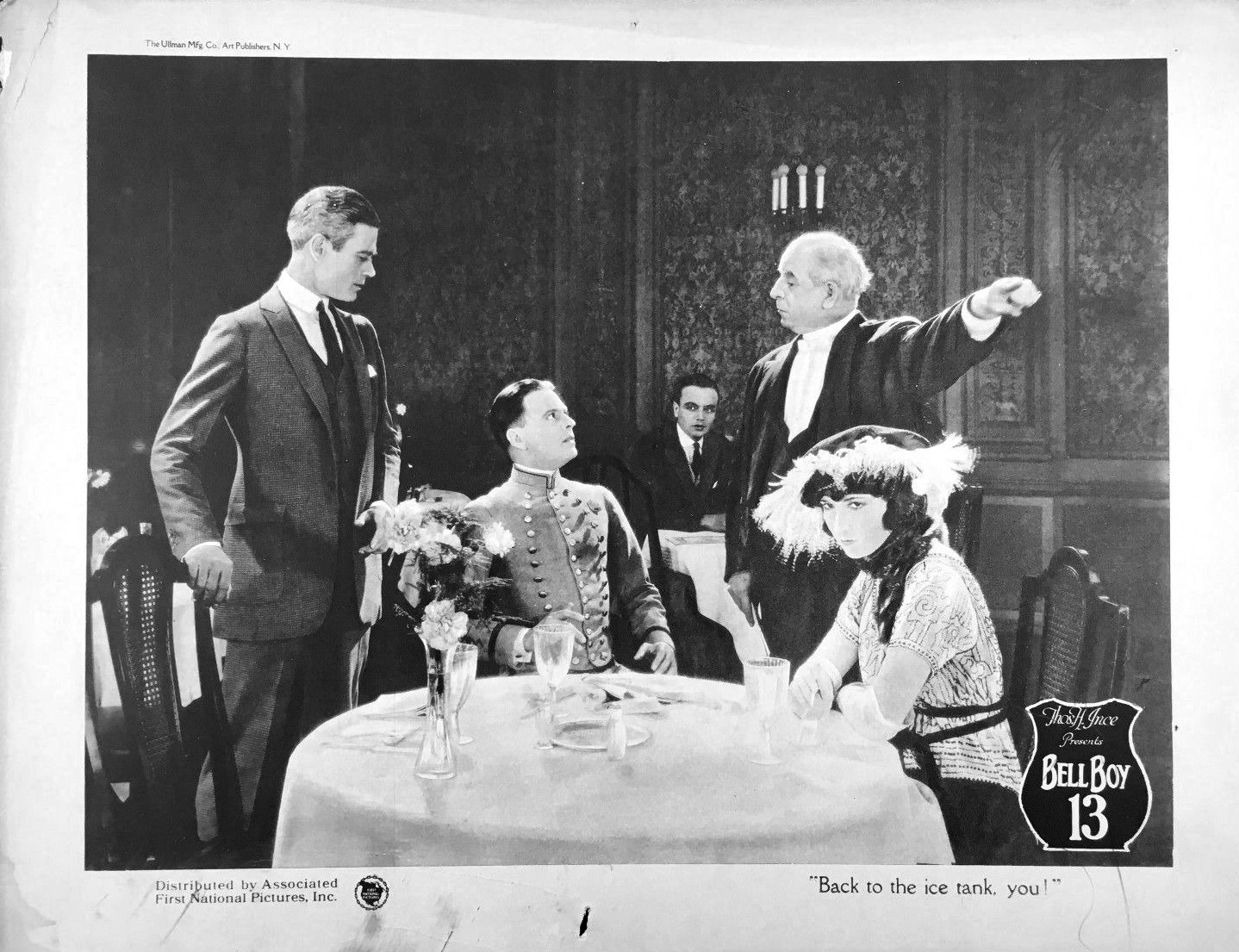
- Lobby card
- Directed by: William A. Seiter
- Written by: Violet Clark
- Story by: Austin Gill
- Starring: Douglas MacLean; John Steppling; Margaret Loomis; William Courtright; Emily Gerdes; Eugene Burr
- Cinematography: Bert Cann
- Production company: Thomas H. Ince Corporation
- Distributed by: First National Pictures
- Release date: January 19, 1923
- Running time: 5 reels
- Country: United States
- Language: Silent (English intertitles)

Bell Boy 13 is a 1923 American silent comedy film directed by William A. Seiter, and starring Douglas MacLean, John Steppling, Margaret Loomis, William Courtright, Emily Gerdes, and Eugene Burr. The film was released by First National Pictures on January 19, 1923.

== Plot ==
As described in a film magazine, college graduate Harry Elrod wishes to marry actress Kitty Clyde, but his Uncle Ellrey Elrod has picked out Angela Fish as a wife for his nephew. Harry arranges an elopement with Kitty. His uncle's suspicions are aroused and he trails Harry continuously. Miss Fish and her father the Reverend Doctor Wilbur Fish call. Harry in desperation starts a fire in his room. He is rescued by the fire brigade and then stages a run through the streets in the fire chief's car, intending to catch another train and follow Kitty. He escapes the pursuing firemen, boards the train, and arrives safely at the Philadelphia hotel where Kitty will meet him. There he finds that she has changed her mind, coming to believe that he must have his uncle's consent.

He then receives a telegram from his uncle, disowning him. Broke, Harry takes a job as a hotel bell boy. In uniform, he enters where Kitty is dining with Mr. Haskell, her press agent, and sits down, but is dragged away by the indignant hotel manager. Uncle Ellrey comes to the hotel but is shown the wrong room by Harry, so he demands that Harry be fired. The manager, ever ready to make a guest happy, is ready to oblige him, but Harry turns Bolshevist and induces the entire hotel staff to go on strike. The result is that the uncle is defeated, and Harry wins Kitty.

== Cast ==
- Douglas MacLean as Harry Elrod
- John Steppling as Uncle Ellrey Elrod
- Margaret Loomis as Kitty Clyde
- William Courtright as Reverend Doctor Wilbur Fish
- Emily Gerdes as Angela Fish
- Eugene Burr as The Mystery Man
- Jean Walsh as Pink
- William Irving as Hotel Dining Room Guest (uncredited)
- Edgar Kennedy as Chef (uncredited)
- Larry Steers as Mr. Haskell, Press Agent (uncredited)

== Preservation ==
Prints of the film survive in the Library of Congress and UCLA Film and Television Archive.
