= Dress Parade =

1927 silent film by Donald Crisp

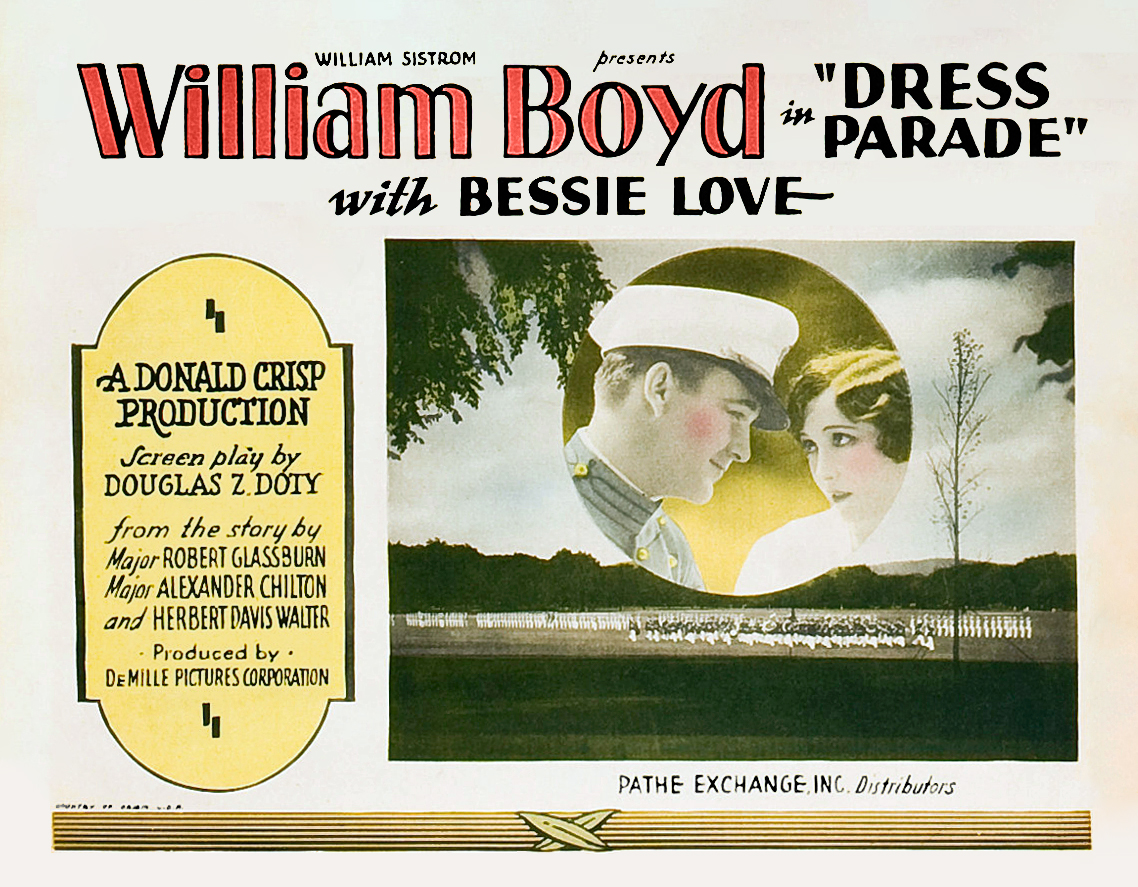
- Lobby card
- Directed by: Donald Crisp
- Written by: Major Robert Glassburn (story); Major Alexander Chilton (story); Herbert David Walter (story); Douglas Z. Doty (scenario); John Krafft (intertitles)
- Produced by: William Sistrom
- Starring: William Boyd; Bessie Love
- Cinematography: Peverell Marley
- Edited by: Barbara Hunter
- Distributed by: Pathé Exchange
- Release date: November 11, 1927
- Running time: 7 reels; 6,599 feet
- Country: United States
- Language: Silent (English intertitles)

Dress Parade is a 1927 American silent romantic drama film produced by William Sistrom and Cecil B. DeMille and distributed by Pathé. The film stars William Boyd and Bessie Love, and was directed by Donald Crisp. Although it is based on a story by Major Robert Glassburn, Major Alexander Chilton, and Herbert David Walter, the plot is essentially the same as West Point, produced at MGM in 1928.

Dress Parade is preserved at the Berkeley Art Museum and Pacific Film Archive and the UCLA Film and Television Archive, and has been released on home video by Grapevine Video.

== Production ==
For authenticity, many scenes were filmed at West Point. Actress Bessie Love was so impressed by her time on location that she wrote an unpublished novel based on her experiences, Military Mary.

== Plot ==
Civilian Vic Donovan visits West Point, and falls for beautiful Janet Cleghorne, daughter of the commandant. He successfully wins an appointment to the academy, where he and Stuart Haldane, another cadet, vie for Janet's affection. Their competition escalates, nearly resulting in Haldane's dismissal, but Donovan takes responsibility, and Janet falls in love with him.

== Cast ==
- William Boyd as Vic Donovan
- Bessie Love as Janet Cleghorne
- Hugh Allan as Stuart Haldane
- Walter Tennyson as Dusty Dawson
- Maurice Ryan as Mealy Snodgrass
- Louis Natheaux as Patsy Dugan
- Clarence Geldart (as Clarence Geldert) as Commandant

== Release and reception ==
The film received positive reviews, and the performances of Boyd, Natheaux, and Allen were especially praised.

The film was screened to War Department officials in Washington, D.C. Adjutant General Lutz Wahl was a fan of the film, and wrote a letter to his commanding officers to support the film's success in local theaters in any way they could. In Los Angeles, a military-themed parade with star William Boyd led to a showing for 200 troops, and in Providence, Rhode Island, an army band played in the lobby of a theater.
