= Douglas Z. Doty =

American screenwriter

Douglas Zabriskie Doty
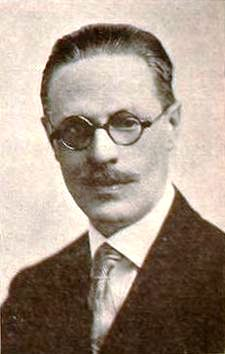
- Doty in 1920
- Born: October 15, 1874; New York, New York, US
- Died: February 20, 1935 (aged 60); Los Angeles, California, US
- Years active: 1920–1938

Douglas Zabriskie Doty (October 15, 1874 – February 20, 1935) was an American screenwriter and editor. Doty wrote the screenplays for more than 60 films between 1920 and 1938, the last one being Always Goodbye released in 1938, three years after his death. Doty also worked as an editor for The Century Company.

Together with his co-writers Harry d'Abbadie d'Arrast and Donald Ogden Stewart, he was nominated for the 1931 Academy Award for Best Writing (Original Story) for the film Laughter.

He was born in New York, New York, and died in Los Angeles, California.

== Filmography ==
- Two Kinds of Love (1920)
- Risky Business (1920)
- Beautifully Trimmed (1920)
- Society Secrets (1921)
- The Dangerous Moment (1921)
- Sham (1921)
- A Kiss in Time (1921)
- Her Winning Way (1921)
- The Rage of Paris (1921)
- The Speed Girl (1921)
- Nancy from Nowhere (1922)
- A Prince of a King (1923)
- How to Educate a Wife (1924)
- Broadway After Dark (1924)
- Circe, the Enchantress (1924)
- The Wife of the Centaur (1924)
- A Fool and His Money (1925)
- Who Cares (1925)
- After Business Hours (1925)
- The Danger Signal (1925)
- Fighting the Flames (1925)
- The Great Sensation (1925)
- The King on Main Street (1925)
- The Unchastened Woman (1925)
- The Wedding Song (1925)
- Red Dice (1926)
- Young April (1926)
- Nobody's Widow (1927)
- Man Bait (1927)
- Vanity (1927)
- The Fighting Eagle (1927)
- Dress Parade (1927)
- Tenth Avenue (1928)
- Dry Martini (1928)
- Romance of the Underworld (1928)
- The Veiled Woman (1929)
- Masked Emotions (1929)
- Pleasure Crazed (1929)
- The Leather Pushers (1930)
- Kid Roberts (1930)
- Laughter (1930)
- College Lovers (1930)
- Hammer and Tongs (1930)
- The Knockout (1930)
- The Comeback (1930)
- The Mardi Gras (1930)
- All for a Lady (1930)
- Framed! (1931)
- The Lady Killer (1931)
- Kane Meets Abel (1931)
- The Champion (1931)
- Dangerous Daze (1931)
- One Day to Live (1931)
- Rive gauche (1931)
- Lo mejor es reir (1931)
- Die Männer um Lucie (1931)
- The Silent Witness (1932)
- Drifting Souls (1932)
- Racetrack (1933)
- The Important Witness (1933)
- Gallant Lady (1934)
- Three on a Honeymoon (1934)
- Always Goodbye (1938)
