= Margaret Loomis =

American film actress

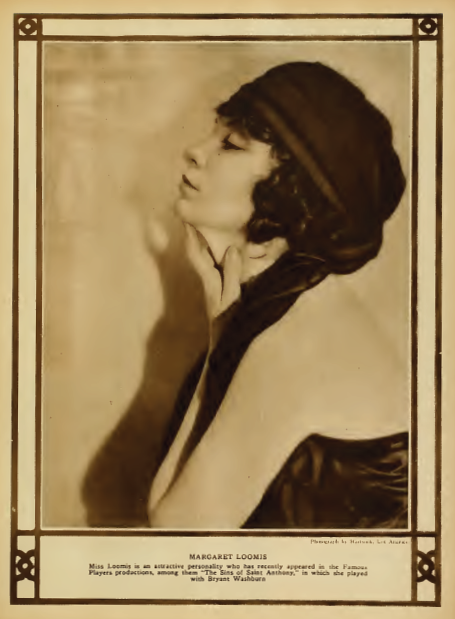
- Born: May 27, 1893; San Francisco, California, U.S.
- Died: July 5, 1969 (aged 76); Los Angeles, California, U.S.
- Occupation: Actress
- Years active: 1916–1925 (film)
- Spouse: Richard Wayne Crook

Margaret Loomis (1893–1969) was an American film actress of the silent era.

Loomis was an only child.

In addition to her acting, Loomis was a Denishawn dancer. She toured the United States as a member of the Denishawn School's initial troupe before she became an actress in films.

Loomis was married to Los Angeles businessman Richard Wayne Crook.

== Selected filmography ==
- The Call of the East (1917)
- The Bottle Imp (1917)
- Hashimura Togo (1917)
- The Hidden Pearls (1918)
- When a Man Loves (1919)
- Everywoman (1919)
- Told in the Hills (1919)
- The Veiled Adventure (1919)
- Why Smith Left Home (1919)
- Always Audacious (1920)
- What Happened to Jones (1920)
- The Sins of St. Anthony (1920)
- Conrad in Quest of His Youth (1920)
- 3 Gold Coins (1920)
- A Kiss in Time (1921)
- Turn to the Right (1922)
- The Hands of Nara (1922)
- The Strangers' Banquet (1922)
- Money! Money! Money! (1923)
- Bell Boy 13 (1923)
- Law of the Lawless (1923)
- My Neighbor's Wife (1925)

== Bibliography ==
- Goble, Alan. The Complete Index to Literary Sources in Film. Walter de Gruyter, 1999.
