= West Point (film) =

1927 film directed by Edward Sedgwick

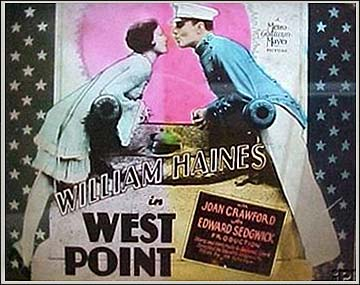
- Directed by: Edward Sedgwick
- Written by: Joseph Farnham (titles)
- Story by: Raymond L. Schrock
- Produced by: Edward Sedgwick
- Starring: William Haines; Joan Crawford; William Bakewell; Neil Neely
- Cinematography: Ira H. Morgan
- Edited by: Frank Sullivan
- Distributed by: Metro-Goldwyn-Mayer
- Release date: December 31, 1927 (New York City)
- Running time: 95 minutes
- Country: United States
- Languages: Silent (English intertitles)

West Point is a 1927 American silent romantic drama film starring William Haines and Joan Crawford in a story about an arrogant cadet who finds love right before the Army–Navy Game.

The story and screenplay were written by Raymond L. Schrock with titles written by Joseph Farnham. The film was directed by Edward Sedgwick.

== Plot ==
West Point (1927)

Arrogant and wise-cracking Brice Wayne enrolls at the United States Military Academy at West Point and adjusts to life as a plebe. He tries out for the plebe football team, where he excels and shows up the varsity team. However, his ego is unrivaled, especially in competition with upperclassman Bob Sperry. At the same time, Brice meets a local girl named Betty Channing who cheers for him at football practices.

A year later, Brice is the star football player for West Point. By this time, both Sperry and Brice are in love with Betty, and while Sperry acts like a gentleman towards Betty, Brice forces a kiss on Betty, only for her to spurn him. Betty continues to reject Brice's advances.

When he is benched for his attitude, Brice decries favoritism by Coach Towers to the local paper. After an altercation with the coach in the locker room, Brice shouts "to hell with the Corps" and quits the team in a huff. This causes a scandal among the cadets, who move to have the Cadet Honor Committee "Silence" Brice.

Brice's roommate Tex McNeil tries to reason with him but the angered Brice hits him. Immediately regretting his actions, Brice tries to help. After Brice leaves to contemplate his actions in private, Tex accidentally falls down a flight of stairs. Despite this he pleads with the Honor Committee not to censure Brice—before collapsing with a serious concussion.

Brice writes a letter of resignation from West Point out of shame, but regrets his action when he realizes he needs to help the team. As the train carrying the team to the Army–Navy Game is about to leave, Brice is called before the superintendent. When he indicates both his contrition and an understanding of the "spirit of the Corps," the superintendent hands him back his resignation.

Brice apologizes to the coach for his behavior but is still benched. In the 4th quarter, with Army down, a player is injured and Brice is sent in. Despite an injured arm he scores a touchdown that wins the game for Army, and asks for forgiveness from his team.

As graduation from West Point concludes some years later, he ends in the arms of Betty while enthusiastically observing the traditions of the Corps.

== Cast ==
- William Haines as Brice Wayne
- Joan Crawford as Betty Channing
- William Bakewell as "Tex" McNeil
- Neil Neely as Bob Sperry
- Ralph Emerson as Bob Chase
- Leon Kellar as Captain Munson
- Raymond G. Moses as Coach Towers (*billed Major Raymond G. Moses U.S.A.)

== Production notes ==
The film was shot on location at West Point, New York.

The same story used for this film was used for the DeMille Company's 1927 movie Dress Parade with William Boyd and Bessie Love.

The assistant director was Edward Brophy, who would soon switch to acting full-time.

== Reception ==
Photoplay wrote "Bill Haines' starring vehicle...treats everything in a humorous vein in the beginning, getting many laughs."

== See also ==
- List of American football films
