= The Sins of St. Anthony =

1920 film by James Cruze

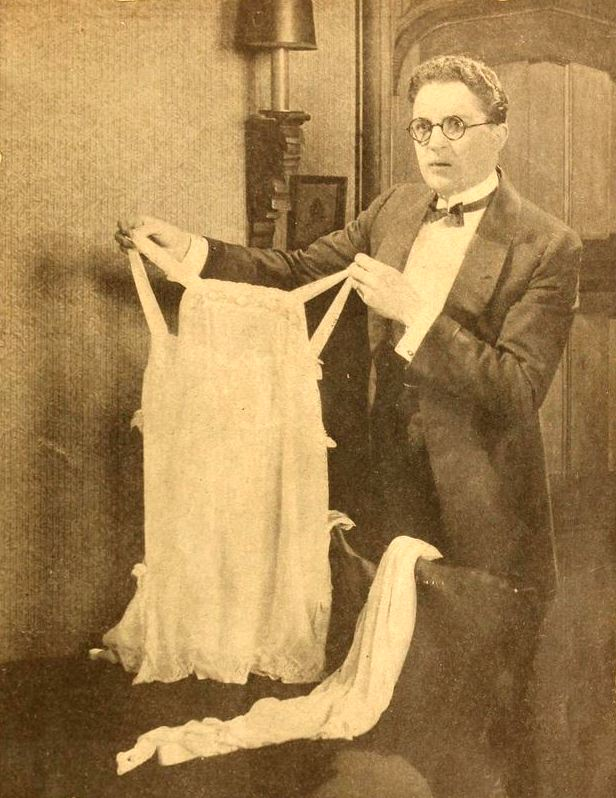
- Still with Bryant Washburn
- Directed by: James Cruze
- Screenplay by: Charles Collins; Elmer Blaney Harris
- Produced by: Jesse L. Lasky
- Starring: Bryant Washburn; Margaret Loomis; Lorenza Lazzarini; Viora Daniel; Frank Jonasson; May Baxter
- Production companies: Artcraft Pictures Corporation; Famous Players–Lasky Corporation
- Distributed by: Paramount Pictures
- Release date: July 4, 1920
- Running time: 50 minutes
- Country: United States
- Language: Silent (English intertitles)

The Sins of St. Anthony is a 1920 American silent comedy film directed by James Cruze and written by Charles Collins and Elmer Blaney Harris. Starring Bryant Washburn, Margaret Loomis, Lorenza Lazzarini, Viora Daniel, Frank Jonasson, and May Baxter, it was released on July 4, 1920, by Paramount Pictures.

== Cast ==
- Bryant Washburn as Anthony Osgood
- Margaret Loomis as Jeanette Adair
- Lorenza Lazzarini as Persis Meade
- Viora Daniel as Valeria Vincent
- Frank Jonasson as Lorenzo Pascal
- May Baxter as Christine Fox
- L.J. McCarthy as A. Fox
- Lucien Littlefield as Lieutenant Humphrey Smith
- Guy Oliver as Horatio Meade

== Preservation ==
In February of 2021, The Sins of St. Anthony was cited by the National Film Preservation Board on their Lost U.S. Silent Feature Films list and is therefore presumed lost.
