= One Chance in a Million =

1927 film

- Directed by: Noel M. Smith
- Written by: L.V. Jefferson
- Produced by: Samuel Sax
- Starring: William Fairbanks; Viora Daniel; Charles K. French
- Cinematography: James S. Brown Jr.
- Production company: Gotham Pictures
- Distributed by: Lumas Film Corporation
- Release date: April 1, 1927
- Running time: 55 minutes
- Country: United States
- Languages: Silent; English intertitles

One Chance in a Million is a 1927 American silent crime film directed by Noel M. Smith and starring William Fairbanks, Viora Daniel and Charles K. French. It was produced by the independent company Gotham Pictures.

== Synopsis ==
After rescuing Ruth Torrence an attractive young heiress from a horse, Jerry Blaine realizes that her fiancée Robert Weston is a thief planning to rob her of her diamonds.

== Cast ==
- William Fairbanks as Jerry Blaine
- Viora Daniel as Ruth Torrence
- Charles K. French as Richard Torrence
- Henry Hebert as Robert Weston
- Eddie Borden as Horace Featherby
- Duke Martin as Pat Drogan

== Bibliography ==
- Connelly, Robert B. The Silents: Silent Feature Films, 1910-36, Volume 40, Issue 2. December Press, 1998.
- Munden, Kenneth White. The American Film Institute Catalog of Motion Pictures Produced in the United States, Part 1. University of California Press, 1997.
