= A Ship Comes In =

1928 film

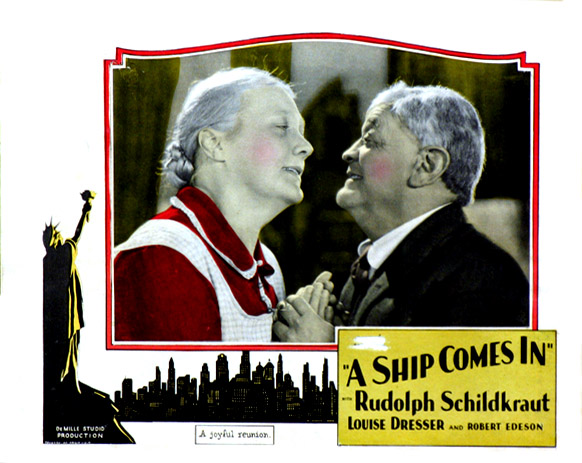
- Lobby card
- Directed by: William K. Howard
- Written by: Julien Josephson; John W. Krafft; Sonya Levien
- Starring: Rudolph Schildkraut; Louise Dresser; Milton Holmes; Linda Landi
- Cinematography: Lucien N. Andriot
- Edited by: Barbara Hunter
- Distributed by: Pathé Exchange
- Release date: January 4, 1928 (U.S.)
- Running time: 70 minutes
- Country: United States
- Languages: Silent (English intertitles)

A Ship Comes In (also known as His Country) is a 1928 American silent film which tells the story of immigrants coming to the United States. It stars Rudolph Schildkraut, Louise Dresser, Milton Holmes, Linda Landi, and Fritz Feld.

The movie was written by Julien Josephson (story) (adaptation), John W. Krafft (titles) and Sonya Levien. It was directed by William K. Howard. It was nominated for the Academy Award for Best Actress (Louise Dresser).

== Plot ==
The film focuses on the Plezniks, a European family immigrating to the United States just before the outbreak of the first World War. The family is boundlessly optimistic about their new life, in particular Peter, the family patriarch. Peter makes a friend of his neighbor Mr. Casey, who helps him get a job as a janitor at the local embassy; after five years, the embassy's Judge makes an enthusiastic Peter a citizen of the United States. At this time, Peter's oldest child Eric, has left to join the military, with the same level of enthusiasm as his father. Mama Pleznik, however, is worried, but lets him go.

In a plot to kill the embassy judge, Peter is framed when an explosive is hidden in a package he had given to the Judge as a thank-you gift. Upon a jury finding him guilty, Peter finally breaks down in tears, but is soon back to his normal optimistic self in prison. His fortune improves when the real bomber, having suffered a guilty conscience, confesses to the police. His patriotism praised, Peter is released, gets his job back (with back pay), and returns to see his family. After a warm welcome, Peter is disheartened to learn that Eric has been killed in action. But his and Mrs. Pleznik's grief turns to pride when they remember Eric was just as loyal to his new country as they were; the film ends with Peter saluting his son's portrait on the wall.

== Cast ==
- Rudolph Schildkraut as Peter Pleznik
- Louise Dresser as Mama Pleznik
- Milton Holmes as Eric
- Linda Landi as Marthe
- Fritz Feld as Sokol
- Lucien Littlefield as Dan Casey
- Robert Edeson as Judge Gresham
- Louis Natheaux as Seymon

== Preservation ==
Prints are preserved in the Library of Congress, George Eastman House, and Filmarchiv Austria.
