= The Fourteenth Man =

1920 film by Joseph Henabery

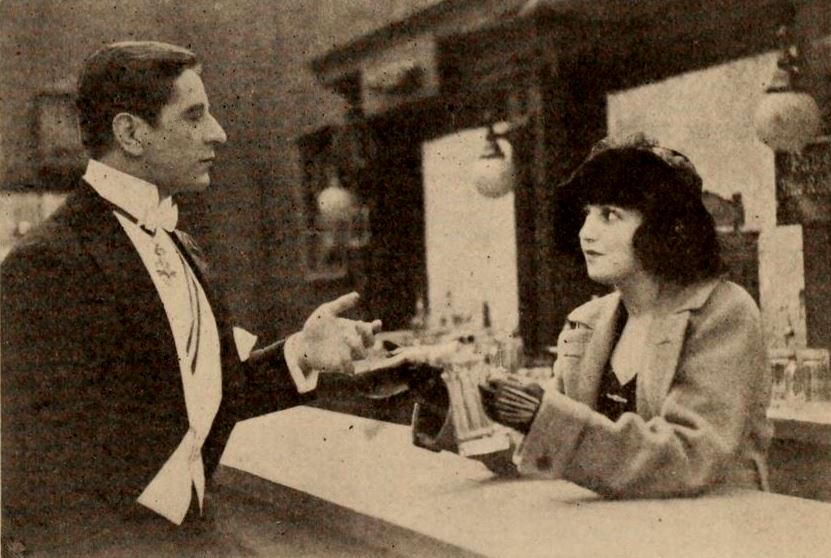
- Robert Warwick and Bebe Daniels
- Directed by: Joseph Henabery
- Written by: Walter Woods
- Based on: The Man from Blankley's by F. Anstey
- Produced by: Jesse Lasky
- Starring: Robert Warwick; Bebe Daniels
- Cinematography: Karl Brown
- Production company: Paramount Pictures
- Distributed by: Paramount Pictures
- Release date: September 1920
- Running time: 50 minutes
- Country: United States
- Languages: Silent film (English intertitles)

The Fourteenth Man is a lost 1920 American silent comedy film starring Robert Warwick and Bebe Daniels. It was directed by Joseph Henabery and produced and distributed by Paramount Pictures.

This film is an adaption of F. Anstey's play, The Man from Blankley's. It was remade a decade later as a talkie, The Man from Blankley's, at Warner's with John Barrymore.

This film had several alternate titles i.e.: The Romantic Meddler, The Trouble Hunter, Hunting Trouble.

== Cast ==
- Robert Warwick as Captain Douglas Gordon
- Bebe Daniels as Marjory Seaton
- Walter Hiers as Harry Brooks
- Robert Milasch as Jenks(*as Robert Milash)
- Norman Selby as Dwight Sylvester
- Jim Farley as Monk Brady
- Clarence Geldart as Major McDowell
- Viora Daniel as Mrs. McDowell
- Robert Dudley as Tidmarsh
- Lucien Littlefield as Wesley Colfax Winslow
- John McKinnon as Dawes
