= Why Smith Left Home =

1919 film by Donald Crisp

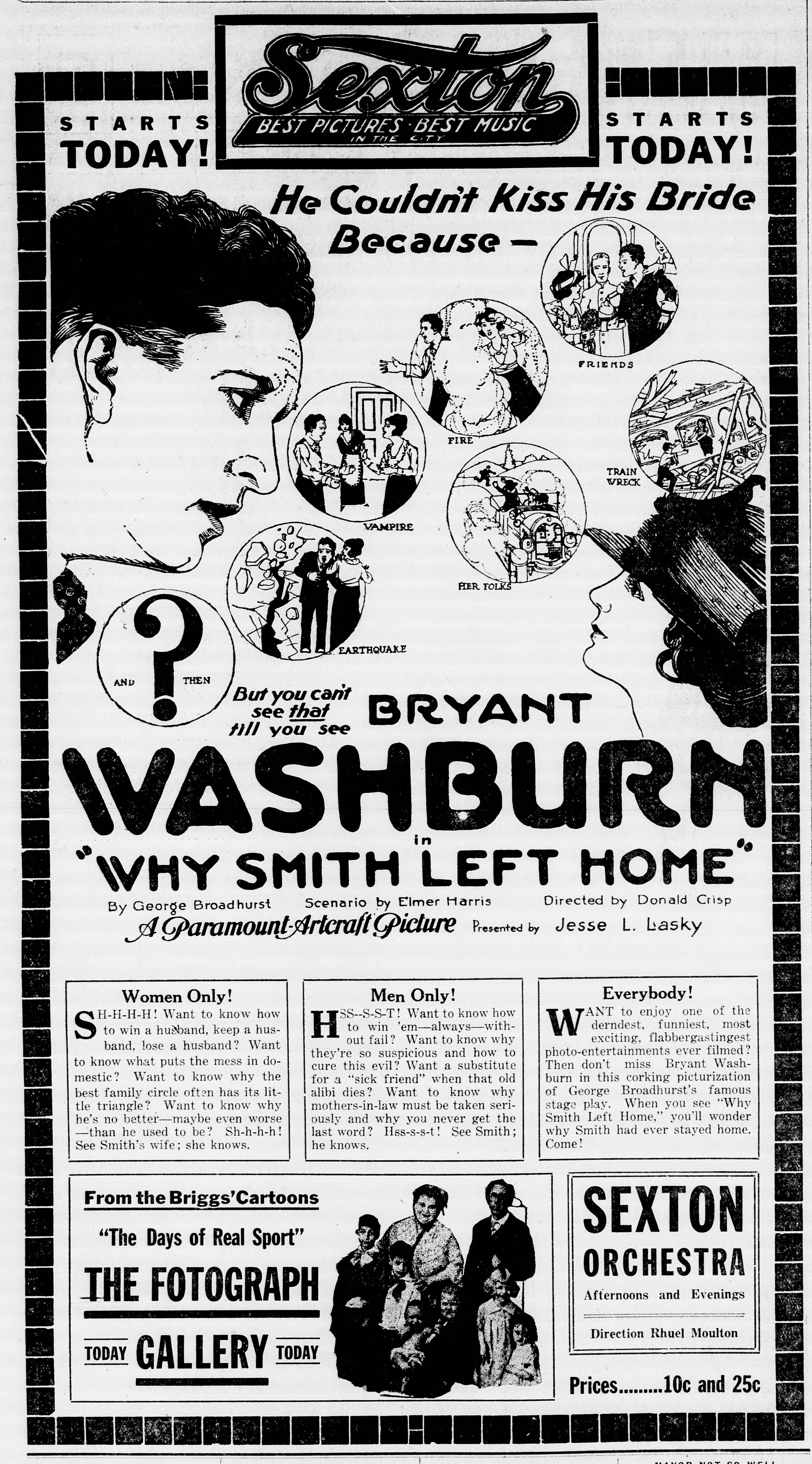
- Newspaper advertisement
- Directed by: Donald Crisp
- Written by: Elmer Harris
- Based on: Why Smith Left Home by George Broadhurst
- Produced by: Adolph Zukor; Jesse L. Lasky
- Starring: Bryant Washburn; Lois Wilson
- Cinematography: Charles Schoenbaum (as C. Edgar Schoenbaum)
- Production company: Famous Players–Lasky
- Distributed by: Paramount Pictures
- Release date: October 19, 1919
- Running time: 5 reels
- Country: United States
- Language: Silent (English intertitles)

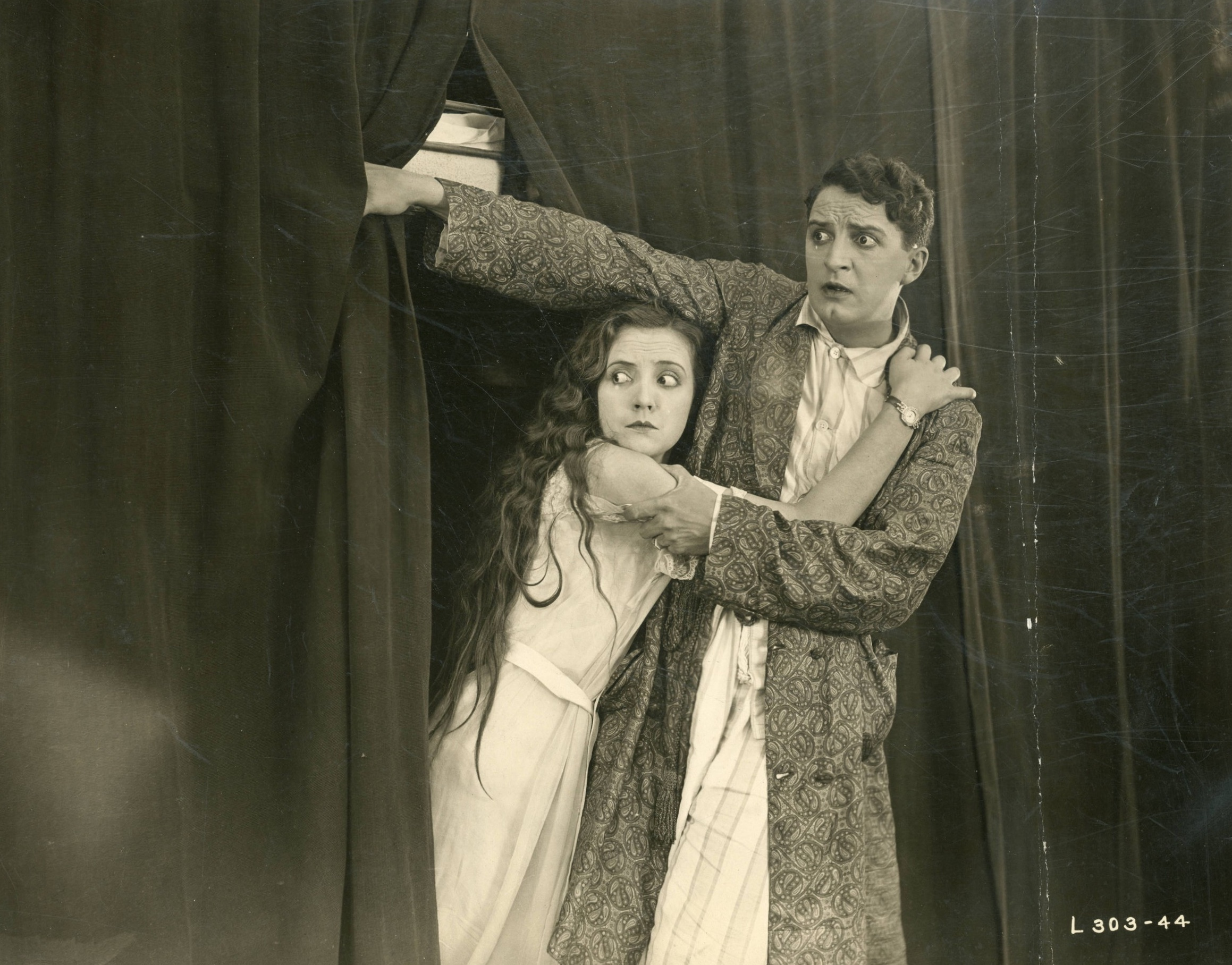
Still with Lois Wilson and Bryant Washburn

Why Smith Left Home is a 1919 American silent film farce directed by Donald Crisp and starring Bryant Washburn. Famous Players–Lasky produced the film with distribution through Paramount Pictures. This film is based on the turn of the century play, Why Smith Left Home, by George Broadhurst. The play starred Maclyn Arbuckle in the Washburn role.

An incomplete copy of Why Smith Left Home is held at the Library of Congress.

== Cast ==
- Bryant Washburn as John Brown Smith
- Lois Wilson as Marian
- Mayme Kelso as Aunt Mary
- Winter Hall as The General
- Walter Hiers as Bob White
- Margaret Loomis as Julie
- Carrie Clark Ward as Lavina
