= Cheap Kisses =

1924 film by John Ince

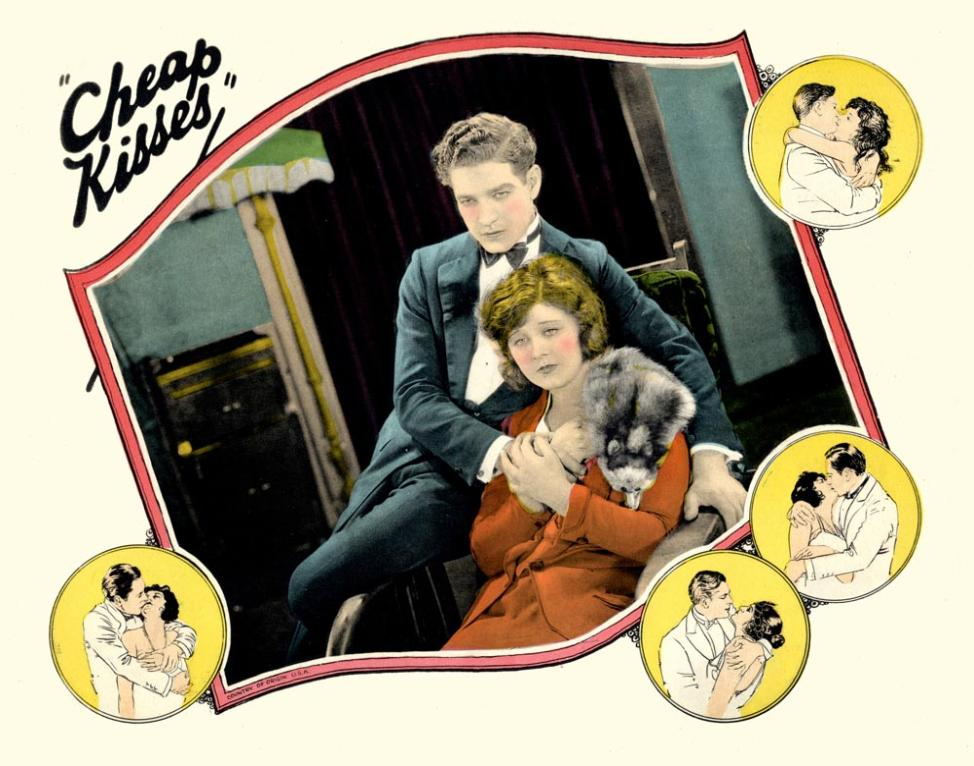
- Lobby card
- Directed by: John Ince; Cullen Tate
- Written by: C. Gardner Sullivan
- Produced by: C. Gardner Sullivan
- Starring: Jean Hersholt
- Cinematography: Jules Cronjager
- Edited by: Barbara Hunter
- Production company: C. Gardner Sullivan Productions
- Distributed by: Film Booking Offices of America
- Release date: December 21, 1924
- Running time: 7 reels
- Country: United States
- Language: Silent (English intertitles)

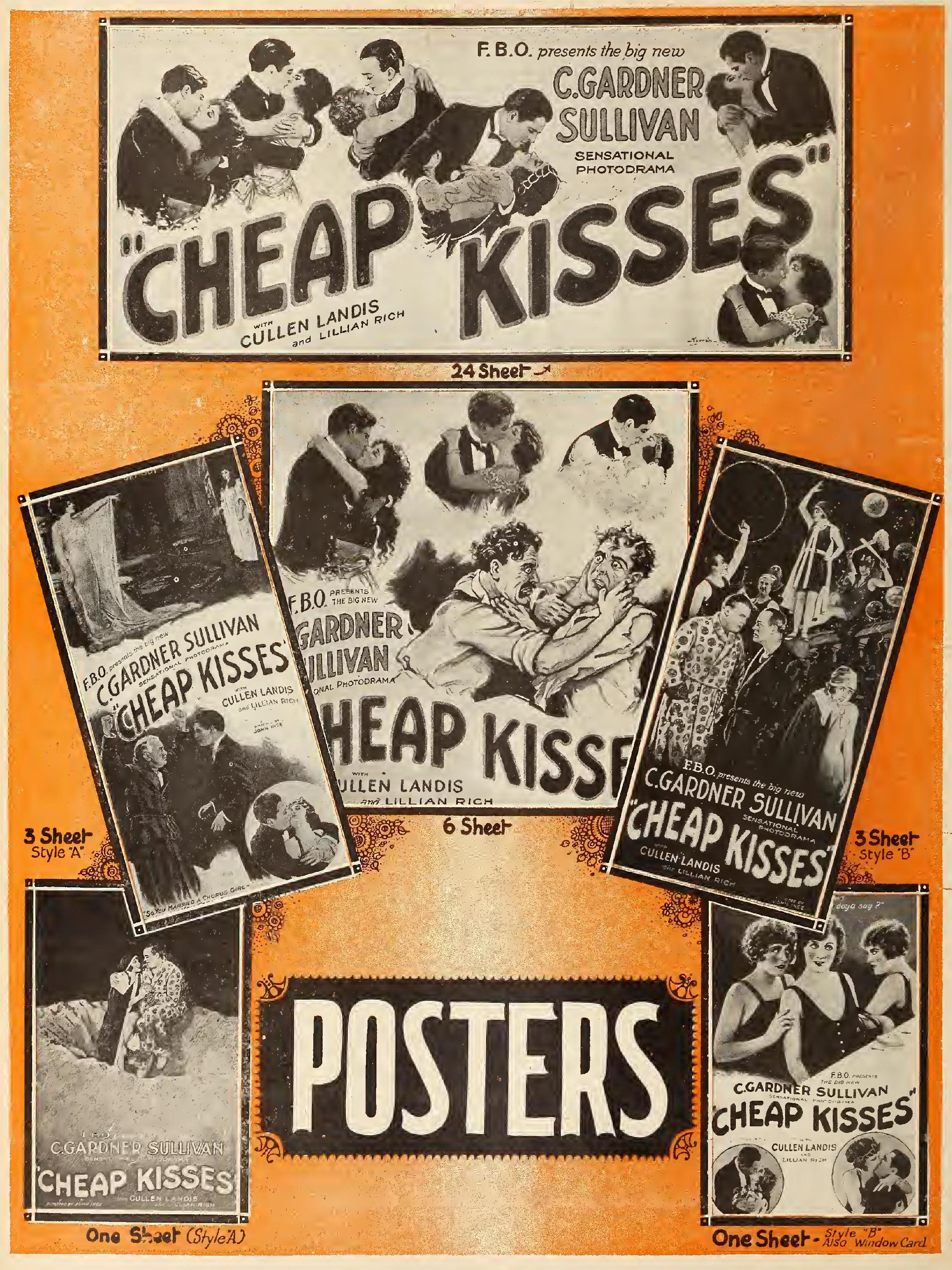
Cheap Kisses ad in Exhibitor's Trade Review (Nov 1924-Feb 1925)

Cheap Kisses is a 1924 American silent drama film starring Jean Hersholt as a famous sculptor. This was the first film made by screenwriter C. Gardner Sullivan through his new production company, C. Gardner Sullivan Productions. Sullivan also wrote the screenplay. The film was described as "a virile, fast-moving, jazzy story of the present day and age. It shows the peril to the youth of the land along the cocktail, petting-party route."

== Plot ==
As described in a review in a film magazine, Donald Dillingham (Landis) marries a chorus girl, Ardell Kendall (Rich), and his wealthy family turn him down, but when they learn that the celebrated sculptor, Gustaf Borgstrom (Hersholt), who is being lionized by society, has selected Ardell as the most beautiful American woman, they call on Donald and insist that he and Ardell and Borgstrom visit their big estate. Among the jazzy crowd present is an adventuress, Maybelle Westcott (Eyton), and Donald falls for her. Ardell, using as a lever his father's infatuation for a showgirl, gets money from him and then buys Maybelle off and exposes her when she does not live up to her bargain. Donald resents her attitude and she leaves him. Returning to their home she finds Donald, contrite, is already there and she forgives him.

== Cast ==
- Jean Hersholt as Gustaf Borgstrom
- Michael Dark as Butterworth Little
- Sidney DeGray as Henry Dillingham
- Louise Dresser as Jane Dillingham
- Bessie Eyton as Maybelle Wescott
- Cullen Landis as Donald Dillingham
- Kathleen Myers as Mignon De Lisle
- Vera Reynolds as Kitty Dillingham
- Lillian Rich as Ardell Kendall
- Tom Ricketts as The Old Man
- Phillips Smalley as George Wescott
- Lincoln Stedman as Bill Kendall

== Preservation ==
With no prints of Cheap Kisses located in any film archives, it is a lost film.
