= Old Shoes =

1925 film

- Directed by: Frederick Stowers
- Written by: Frederick Stowers
- Produced by: Frederick Stowers
- Starring: Noah Beery; Viora Daniel; ZaSu Pitts
- Production company: Peerless Pictures
- Distributed by: Hollywood Pictures Corporation
- Release date: March 1925
- Running time: 70 minutes
- Country: United States
- Languages: Silent; English intertitles

Old Shoes is a 1925 American silent independent drama film directed by Frederick Stowers and starring Noah Beery, Viora Daniel and Zasu Pitts.

== Plot ==
A widowed woman marries her husband's brother, who soon proves to be a tyrant stepfather to his adopted son.

== Cast ==
- Noah Beery as The Stepfather
- John Harron as The Boy
- Viora Daniel
- Ethel Grey Terry
- ZaSu Pitts
- Russell Simpson
- Snitz Edwards

== Bibliography ==
- Connelly, Robert B. The Silents: Silent Feature Films, 1910-36, Volume 40, Issue 2. December Press, 1998.
- Munden, Kenneth White. The American Film Institute Catalog of Motion Pictures Produced in the United States, Part 1. University of California Press, 1997.
