= A Kiss in Time (film) =

1921 film

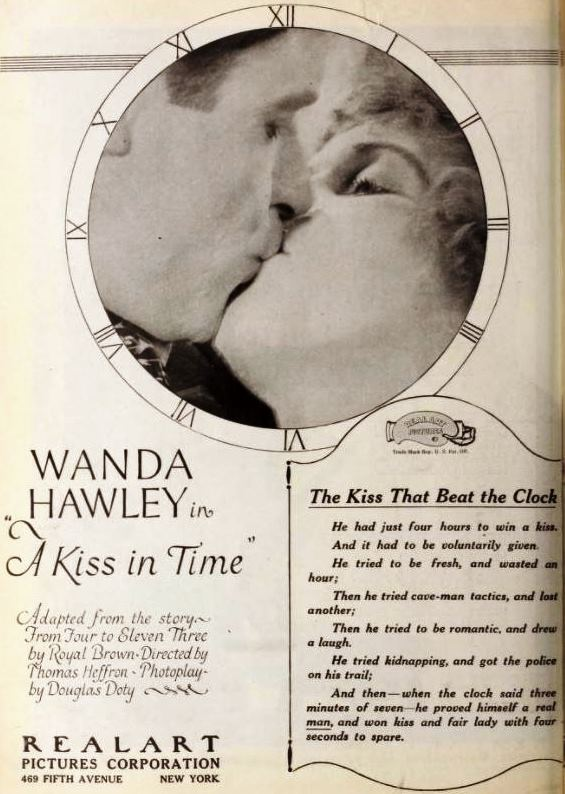
- Advertisement
- Directed by: Thomas N. Heffron
- Screenplay by: Douglas Z. Doty
- Based on: From Four to Eleven-Three by Royal Brown
- Starring: Wanda Hawley; T. Roy Barnes; Bertram Johns; Walter Hiers; Margaret Loomis
- Cinematography: William E. Collins
- Production company: Realart Pictures Corporation
- Distributed by: Realart Pictures Corporation
- Release date: July 1921
- Running time: 50 minutes
- Country: United States
- Language: Silent (English intertitles)

A Kiss in Time is a 1921 American silent comedy film directed by Thomas N. Heffron and written by Douglas Z. Doty. The film stars Wanda Hawley, T. Roy Barnes, Bertram Johns, Walter Hiers, and Margaret Loomis. The film was released in July 1921, by Realart Pictures Corporation.

== Cast ==
- Wanda Hawley as Sheila Ashlone
- T. Roy Barnes as Brian Moore
- Bertram Johns as Robert Codman Ames
- Walter Hiers as Bertie Ballast
- Margaret Loomis as Nymph
