= When a Man Loves (1919 film) =

1919 silent film

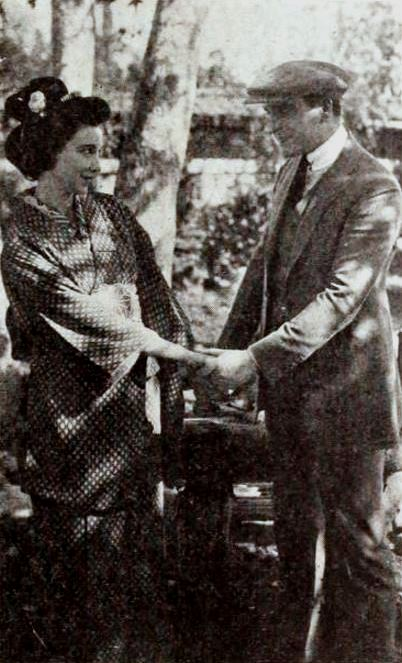
- Directed by: Chester Bennett
- Written by: Richard Schayer; H.H. Van Loan; Florine Williams
- Starring: Earle Williams; Tom Guise; Margaret Loomis
- Production company: Vitagraph Company of America
- Distributed by: Vitagraph Company of America
- Release date: December 5, 1919
- Running time: 50 minutes
- Country: United States
- Languages: Silent; English intertitles

When a Man Loves is a 1919 American silent drama film directed by Chester Bennett and starring Earle Williams, Tom Guise and Margaret Loomis.

== Plot ==
A young Englishman visits Tokyo and falls in love with a Japanese woman who he marries, but obstacles are presented by a jealous Englishwoman who hoped to marry him and the disapproval of his aristocrat father when he returns to Britain.

== Cast ==
- Earle Williams as John Howard Bannister
- Tom Guise as Lord Bannister
- Margaret Loomis as Yuri San
- Edward McWade as Takamura
- Margaret McWade as Yaki
- John Elliott as Sir Robert Eastbourne
- George Hale as Ando Masuki
- Jean Calhoun as Gladys Lees
- William Buckley as Martin Bradley
- Lillian Langdon as Lady Balfour

== Bibliography ==
- Soister, John T., Nicolella, Henry & Joyce, Steve. American Silent Horror, Science Fiction and Fantasy Feature Films, 1913-1929. McFarland, 2014.
