= The Cowboy and the Lady (1922 film) =

1922 film

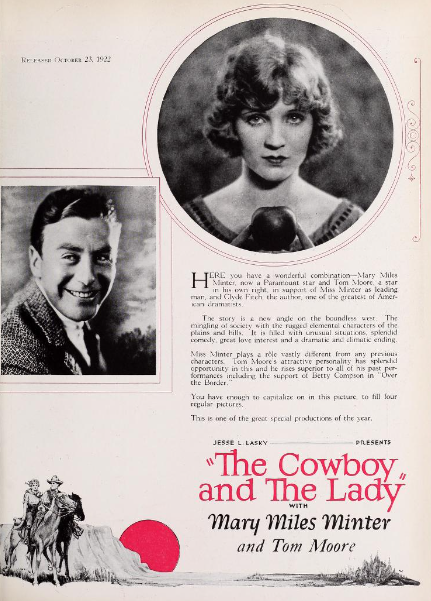
- Advertisement
- Directed by: Charles Maigne
- Written by: Julien Josephson (scenario)
- Based on: The Cowboy and the Lady; 1908 play by Clyde Fitch
- Produced by: Adolph Zukor; Jesse Lasky
- Starring: Mary Miles Minter; Tom Moore
- Cinematography: Faxon M. Dean
- Production company: Famous Players–Lasky
- Distributed by: Paramount Pictures
- Release date: October 15, 1922
- Running time: 5 reels
- Country: United States
- Languages: Silent; English intertitles

The Cowboy and the Lady is a 1922 American silent Western film directed by Charles Maigne and starring Mary Miles Minter and Tom Moore. It was adapted by Julien Josephson from the 1908 play of the same name by Clyde Fitch, and was shot on location at Jackson Hole in Wyoming. As with many of Minter's features, it is thought to be a lost film.

== Plot ==
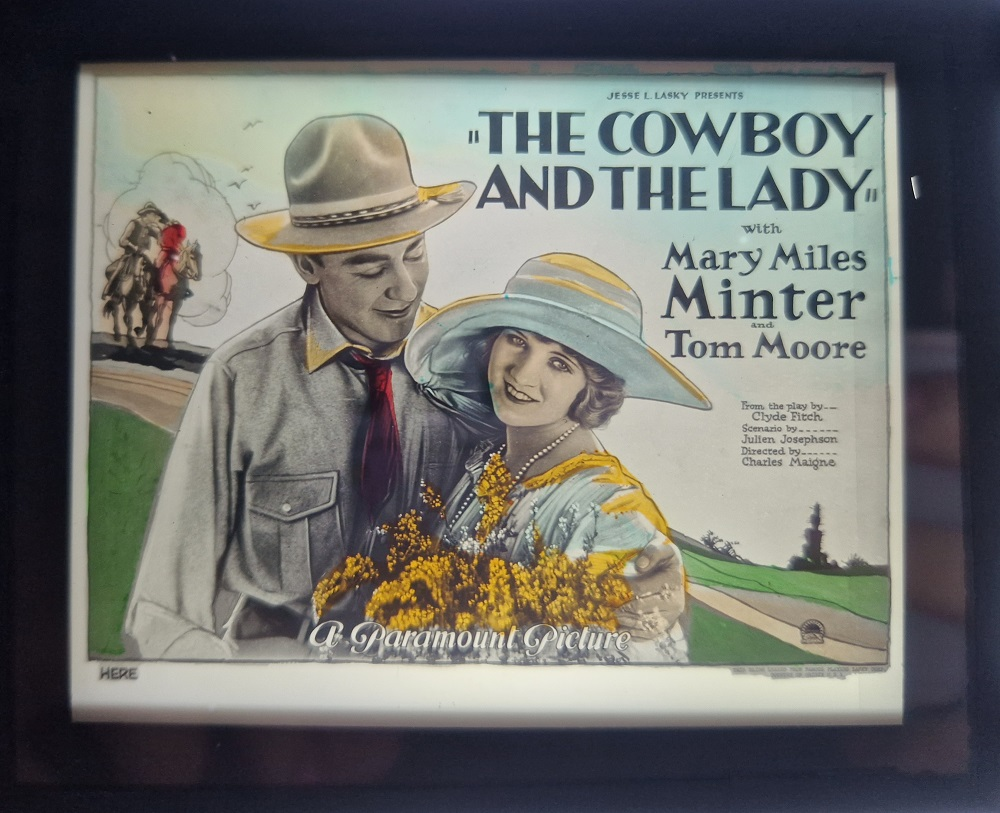
Lantern Slide for "The Cowboy and the Lady"

As described in various film magazine reviews, Jessica Weston, unhappy in her marriage to her feckless husband, travels to her ranch in Wyoming. Her husband accompanies her, but is more interested in Molly, proprietress of the local saloon, than he is in Jessica. This incurs the wrath of ranch hand Ross, who is in love with Molly.

Meanwhile, Jessica is rescued by neighbouring ranch owner Teddy North when her horse abandons her on an island; an attraction develops between them which deepens when Teddy again saves Jessica, this time from a mountain stream.

At a dance in the local saloon, Weston arrives with Molly, angering both Jessica and Ross. A fight breaks out at the same time that the power cuts out, and when light is restored, Weston is found to have been shot dead. Both Jessica and Teddy believe the other to be responsible for the crime, but, to save Jessica from prosecution, Teddy assumes the guilt.

Matters are resolved when Molly confesses that it was in fact Ross who shot Weston out of jealousy. Now that the question of guilt has been answered, Jessica and Teddy are free to pursue their romance.

== Cast ==
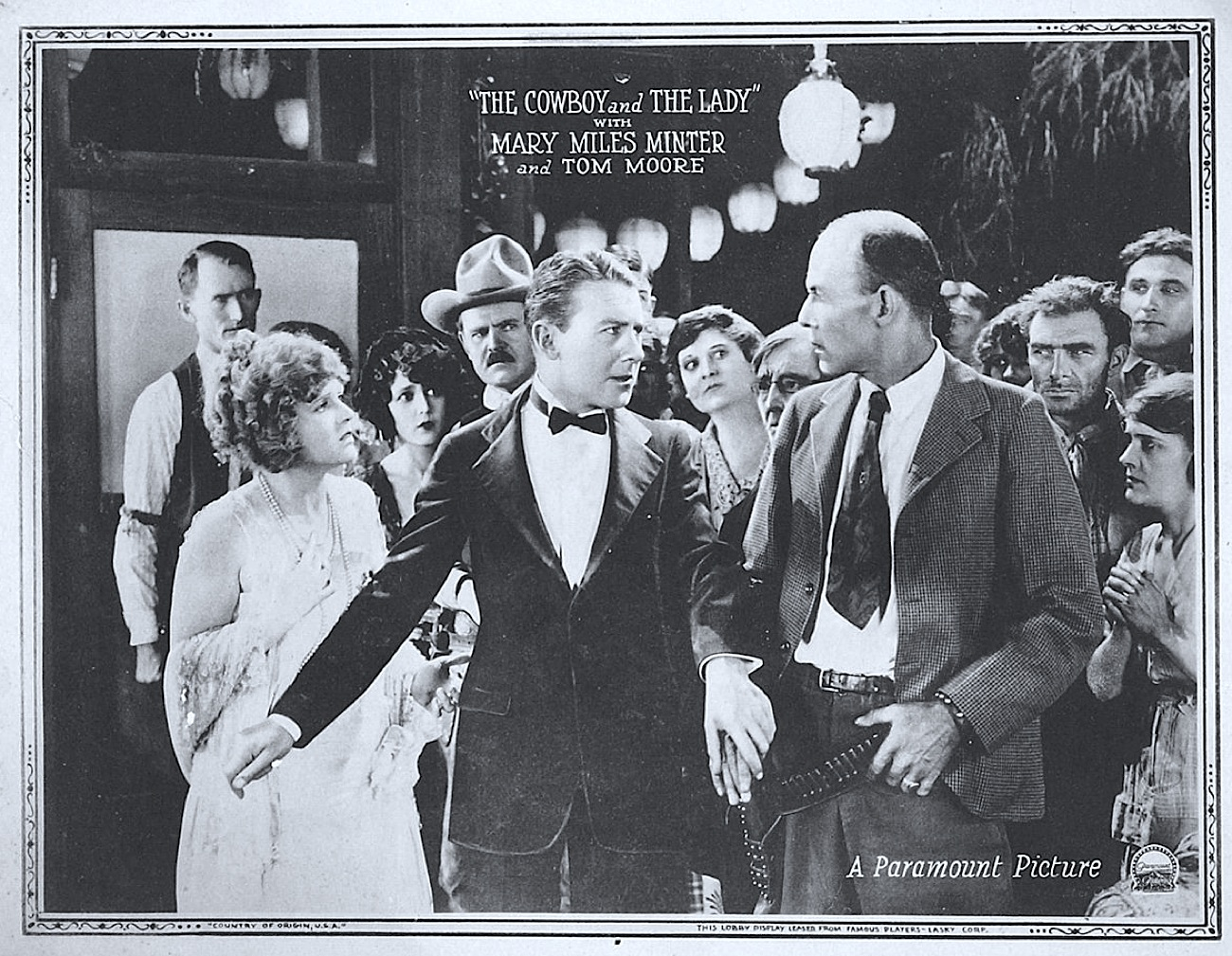
Lobby Card

- Mary Miles Minter as Jessica Weston
- Tom Moore as Teddy North
- Viora Daniel as Molly X
- Margaret Gibson as Midge (billed as Patricia Palmer)
- Robert Schable as Weston
- Guy Oliver as Ross
- Tom London as Joe (billed as Leonard Clapham)
- Bobby Mack as Justice of the Peace (billed as Robert Mack)
