= Barbara Hunter =

American film editor and screenwriter

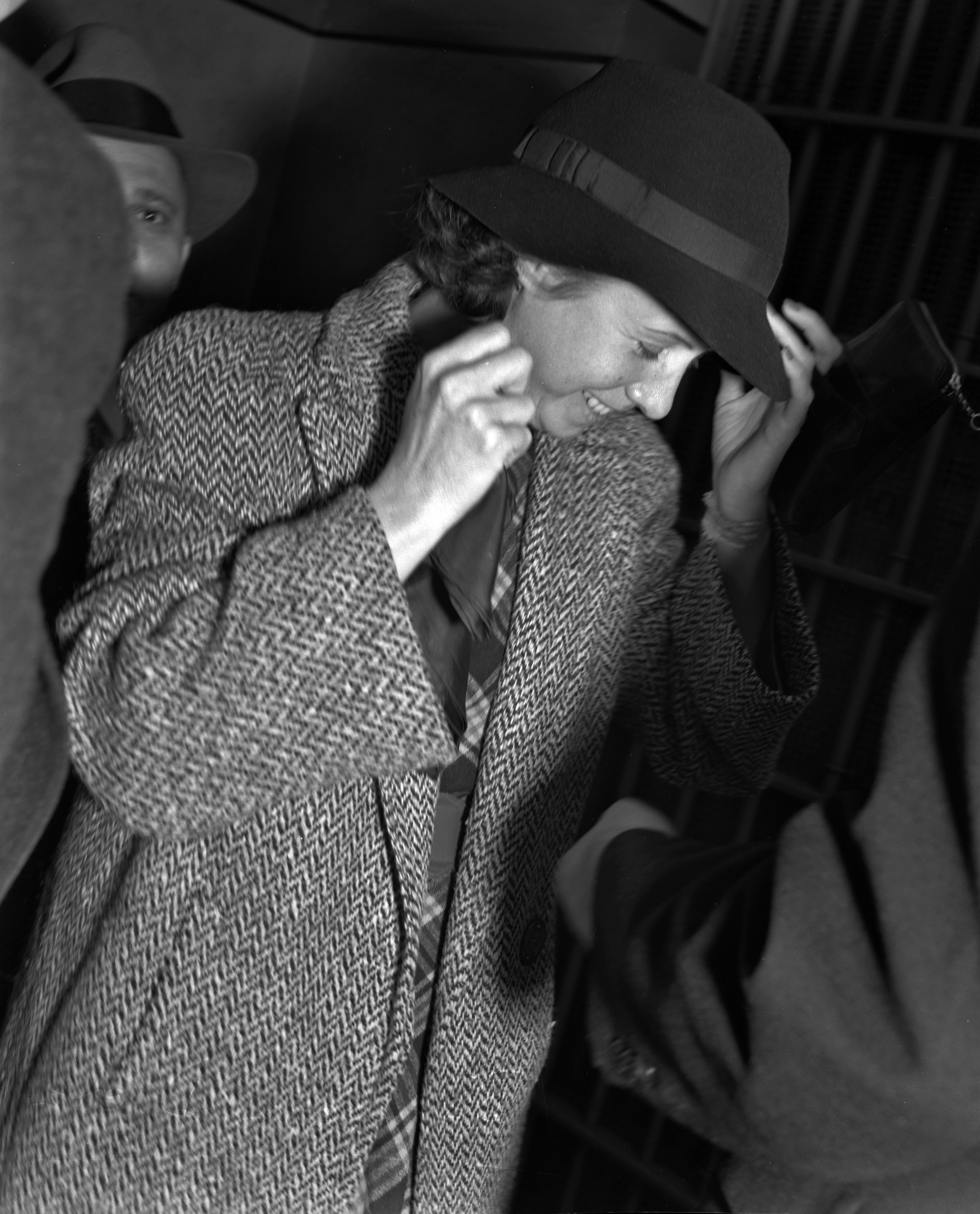
- Hunter in 1939, after an attempted suicide
- Born: Barbara Jackson c. 1898; Virginia, U.S
- Died: unknown
- Occupation(s): Film editor, screenwriter, aviator
- Spouse: William Dietz (m. 1929)

Barbara Hunter (c. 1898 – unknown) was an American film editor and screenwriter active primarily during Hollywood's silent era.

== Biography ==
Barbara got her start in the film industry serving as the personal secretary of Thomas A. Edison and later became the chief scenario writer at Pathe (she did not receive credits for these screenwriting efforts).

Later, she took on editing work, cutting films like Geraldine and A Ship Comes In. She also had an interest in flying, and became one of the first 100 women in the country to get a flying license(she was even once mistaken for Amelia Earhart after landing her plane in Lodi, California).

In 1929, she married Pathe cameraman William Holt Dietz and seems to have retired from the industry afterward. The pair enjoyed flying and yachting together. Toward the end of her life, she was suffering pain from old injuries sustained in an automobile accident and was in poor health; she died sometime around 1940, and was survived by her husband and her son from an earlier relationship.

== Selected filmography ==
- Square Shoulders (1929)
- Geraldine (1929)
- The Cop (1928)
- A Ship Comes In (1928)
- Dress Parade (1927)
- The Fighting Eagle (1927)
- Vanity (1927)
- Cheap Kisses (1924)
