= The Hidden Pearls =

1918 film by George Melford

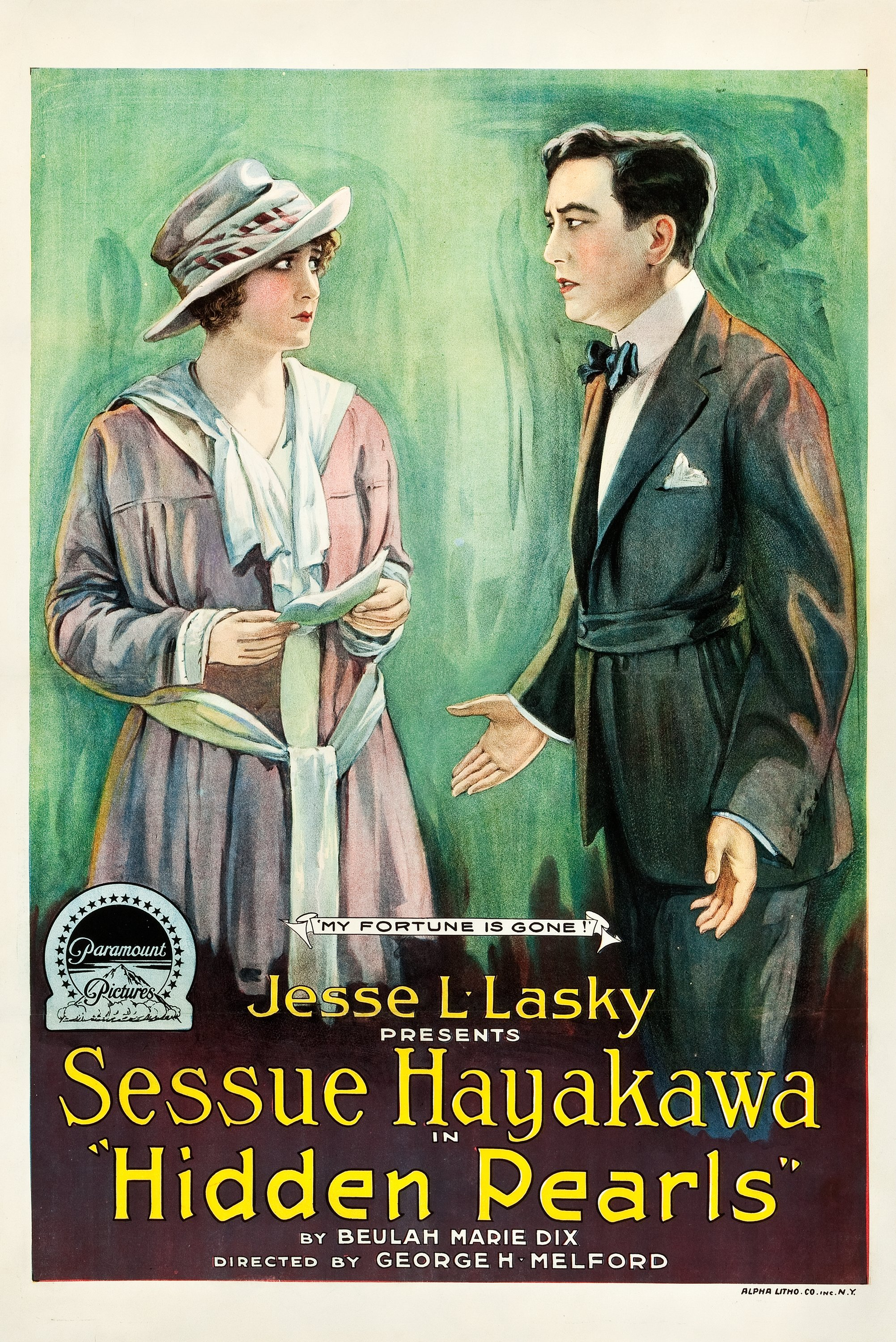
- Film poster
- Directed by: George Melford; Claude Mitchell (asst. director)
- Written by: Beulah Marie Dix (story and screenplay)
- Produced by: Adolph Zukor; Jesse L. Lasky
- Starring: Sessue Hayakawa
- Cinematography: Paul Perry
- Distributed by: Famous Players–Lasky; Paramount Pictures
- Release date: February 18, 1918
- Running time: 5 reels
- Country: United States
- Language: Silent (English intertitles)

The Hidden Pearls is a surviving 1918 American silent drama film directed by George Melford and starring Sessue Hayakawa. It was produced by Adolph Zukor and Jesse L. Lasky and distributed by Famous Players–Lasky and Paramount Pictures. The production was shot in Hawaii.

== Cast ==
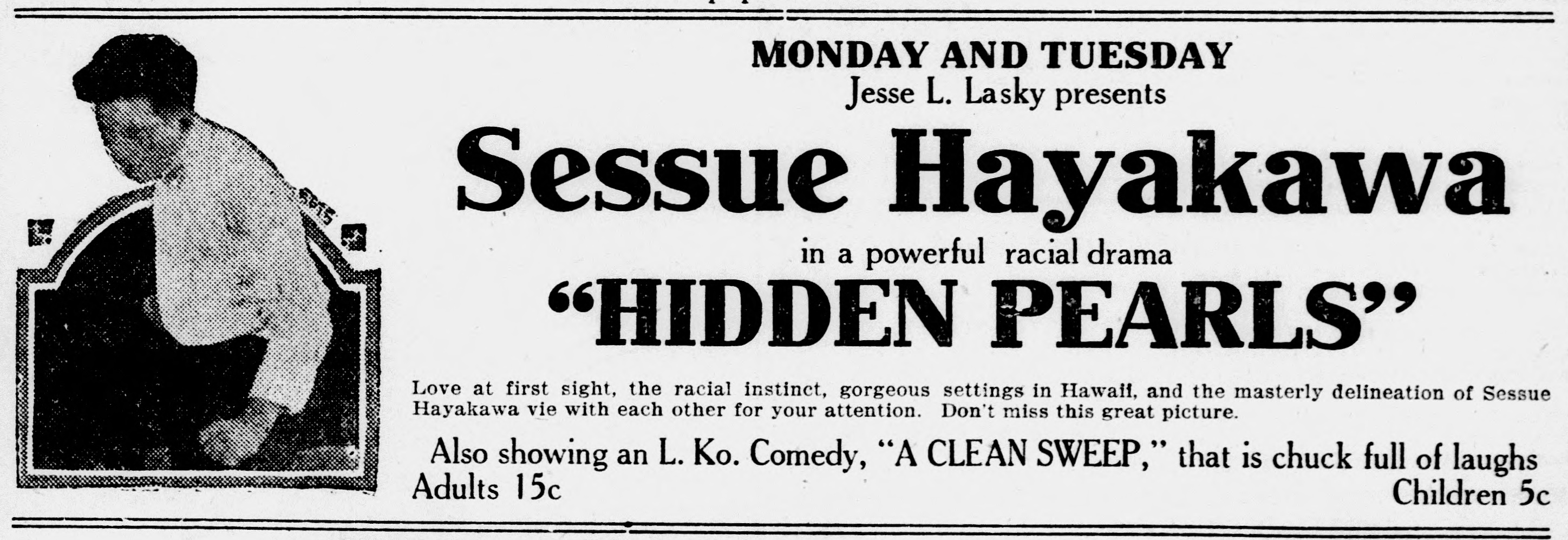
Contemporary newspaper advertisement

- Sessue Hayakawa as Tom Garvin
- Margaret Loomis as Tahona
- Florence Vidor as Enid Benton
- Theodore Roberts as John Garvin
- James Cruze as Koro Leon
- Noah Beery as Teariki
- Clarence Geldart as Captain A. Todd
- Jack Holt as Robert Garvin
- Gustav von Seyffertitz as Senator Joseph Benton
- Henry Woodward as Ensign Brooks
- John Burton

== Preservation ==
The only known print of The Hidden Pearls is held by the French archive Centre national du cinéma et de l'image animée in Fort de Bois-d'Arcy.

== See also ==
- List of Paramount Pictures films
