= The Call of the East =

1917 American film directed by George Melford

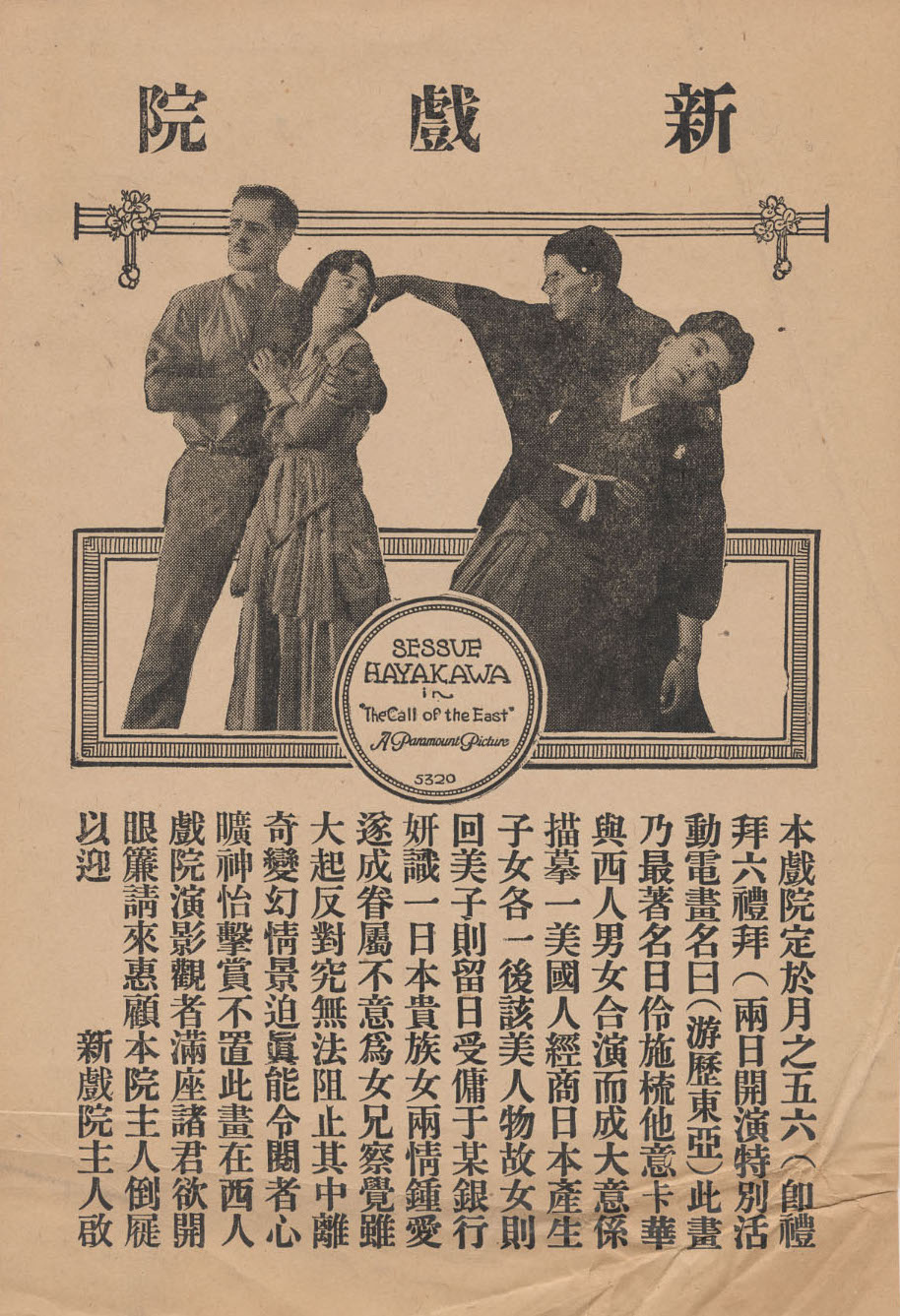
- Advertisement for film
- Directed by: George Melford
- Screenplay by: Beulah Marie Dix
- Produced by: Jesse L. Lasky
- Starring: Sessue Hayakawa; Tsuru Aoki; Jack Holt; Margaret Loomis; James Cruze; Ernest Joy
- Cinematography: Percy Hilburn (French)
- Production company: Jesse L. Lasky Feature Play Company
- Distributed by: Paramount Pictures
- Release date: October 15, 1917
- Running time: 50 minutes
- Country: United States
- Language: Silent (English intertitles)

The Call of the East is a 1917 American silent drama film directed by George Melford and written by Beulah Marie Dix. The film stars Sessue Hayakawa, Tsuru Aoki, Jack Holt, Margaret Loomis, James Cruze, and Ernest Joy. The film was released on October 15, 1917, by Paramount Pictures.

== Plot ==
As described in a film magazine, Sheila Hepburn, the half-sister of Alan Hepburn, is the daughter of a Japanese mother. While visiting Alan, who works in Tokyo, she attends a festival with her Japanese maid while wearing a Japanese kimono. There she meets the wealthy Arai Takada, who is taken by the mysterious woman. Alan has dishonored and betrayed O'Mitsu, and her brother Arai plans a terrible revenge. Alan loses heavily at cards to Arai and, to forget his losses, accompanies Arai to his country home. There Alan is about to be thrust into a pool of quicksand to die when Sheila appears, having been warned of Arai's plans. Dismayed that the woman he met at the festival is Alan's sister, Arai sees that she and Alan do not meet, but later agrees to release her brother as Sheila wins Arai's love and respect. At that moment Alan appears, having escaped from his prison, and strikes Arai down. Sheila bursts into tears and runs to the fallen man, and Alan, seeing his sister responding to the "call of the east," departs.

== Cast ==
- Sessue Hayakawa as Arai Takada
- Tsuru Aoki as O'Mitsu
- Jack Holt as Alan Hepburn
- Margaret Loomis as Sheila Hepburn
- James Cruze as Janzo
- Ernest Joy as Col. Bassett
- Guy Oliver as Cadger
- Jane Wolfe as Yuri

== Reception ==
Like many American films of the time, The Call of the East was subject to cuts by city and state film censorship boards. The Chicago Board of Censors required that these six intertitles be cut: "My sister is an outcast, but the man who shamed her shall pay", "You are my beloved - isn't that enough?", "At Haksima, Hepburn shall pay for O'Mitsu", "Tonight your sister she shall pay the price", "I am ready to marry O'Mitsu", and "I decline the honor".

== Criticism ==
The film allowed Americans to view the film without concerns about the taboo of miscegenation involving Arai Takada and Sheila Hepburn as an intertitle early in the film stated "In reality her mother was Japanese," and the plot indicates that, when Arai met Sheila at the festival, he believed she was Japanese because of the way she was dressed. In contrast, Alan Hepburn treats O'Mitsu simply as his mistress, and the plot requires Arai to ultimately accept the victimization of his sister.

== Preservation ==
With no prints of The Call of the East located in any film archives, it is considered a lost film.
