= The Life of the Party (1920 film) =

1920 film

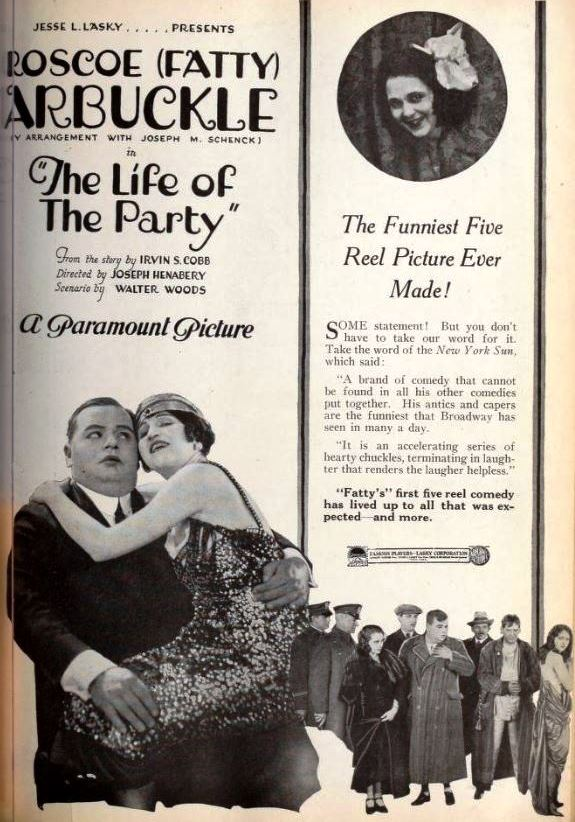
- Advertisement
- Directed by: Joseph Henabery
- Screenplay by: Walter Woods
- Based on: The Life of the Party; 1919 The Saturday Evening Post story by Irvin S. Cobb
- Produced by: Jesse L. Lasky
- Starring: Fatty Arbuckle
- Cinematography: Karl Brown
- Production company: Famous Players–Lasky Corporation
- Distributed by: Paramount Pictures
- Release date: November 21, 1920
- Running time: 5 reels
- Country: United States
- Language: Silent (English intertitles)

The Life of the Party is a 1920 American comedy-drama film starring Roscoe "Fatty" Arbuckle. A copy of the film is held by the Library of Congress.

== Plot ==
Attorney Algernon Leary, "pure milk" candidate for mayor, attends a party for grown-ups dressed as children. Going home in a blizzard, he is robbed of his fur coat, leaving him bare legged wearing rompers. He takes refuge in the first building he can reach, creating havoc in various apartments due to his appearance. He blunders into the rival candidate, Judge Voris in a compromising situation with a vamp and forces him to withdraw, ensuring Leary's election as mayor after a whirlwind campaign.

== Cast ==
Clip from the film

- Roscoe Arbuckle as Algernon Leary
- Winifred Greenwood as Mrs. Carraway
- Roscoe Karns as Sam Perkins
- Julia Faye as 'French' Kate
- Frank Campeau as Judge Voris
- Viora Daniel as Milly Hollister
- Allen Connor as Jake
- Fred Starr as Bolton (credited as Frederick Starr)

== Film still synopsis ==
The December 1921 Film Fun provided a synopsis of the film using stills.

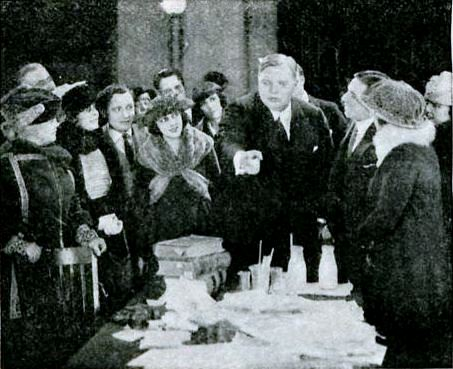
Attorney Leary (Arbuckle) promises the committee pure milk and fair service if he has to fight for it.

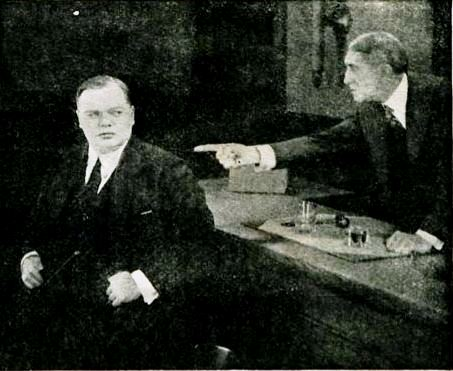
The man (Campeau) responsible for conditions defies the attorney, who thereupon runs for mayor in opposition.

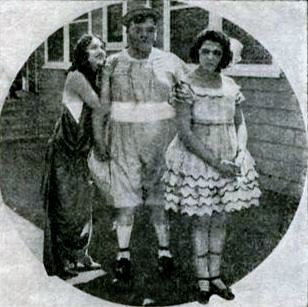
At the children's party he is vamped by a leader of his rival's forces.

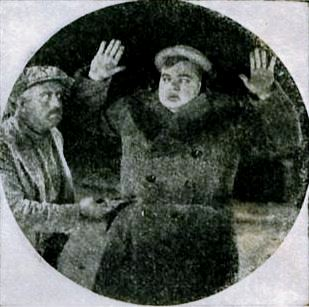
So he starts for home and on the way is relieved of his fur overcoat.

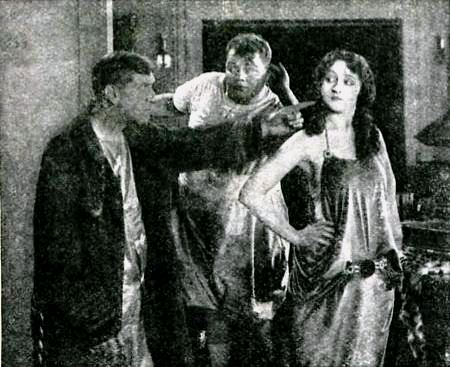
Taking refuge from the blizzard in the first apartment house he surprises the rival candidate in a vamp's room.

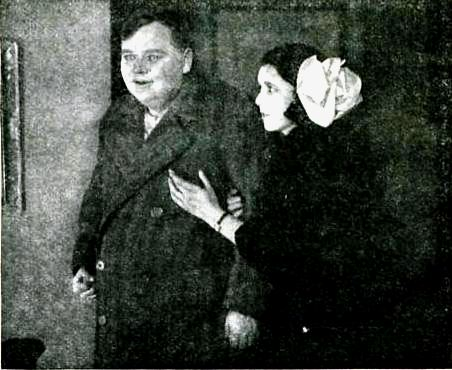
Cold. Of course. Nevertheless, the one he likes best from the committee brings news of the election.
