= Her Winning Way =

1921 film

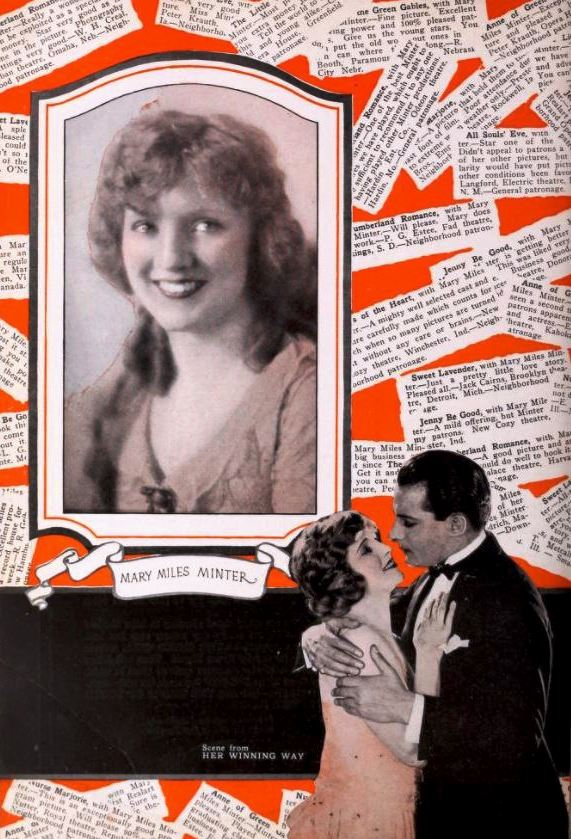
- Advertisement
- Directed by: Joseph Henabery
- Screenplay by: Douglas Z. Doty
- Based on: Ann Annington by Edgar Jepson Ann by Lechmere Worrall
- Starring: Mary Miles Minter; Gaston Glass
- Cinematography: Faxon M. Dean
- Production company: Realart Pictures Corporation
- Distributed by: Realart Pictures Corporation
- Release date: September 1921
- Running time: 5 reels
- Country: United States
- Language: Silent (English intertitles)

Her Winning Way is a silent comedy film directed by Joseph Henabery and starring Mary Miles Minter. The screenplay was written by Douglas Z. Doty, based upon the novel Ann Annington by Edgar Jepson and the play Ann by Lechmere Worrall. As with many of Minter's features, it is thought to be a lost film.

== Plot ==
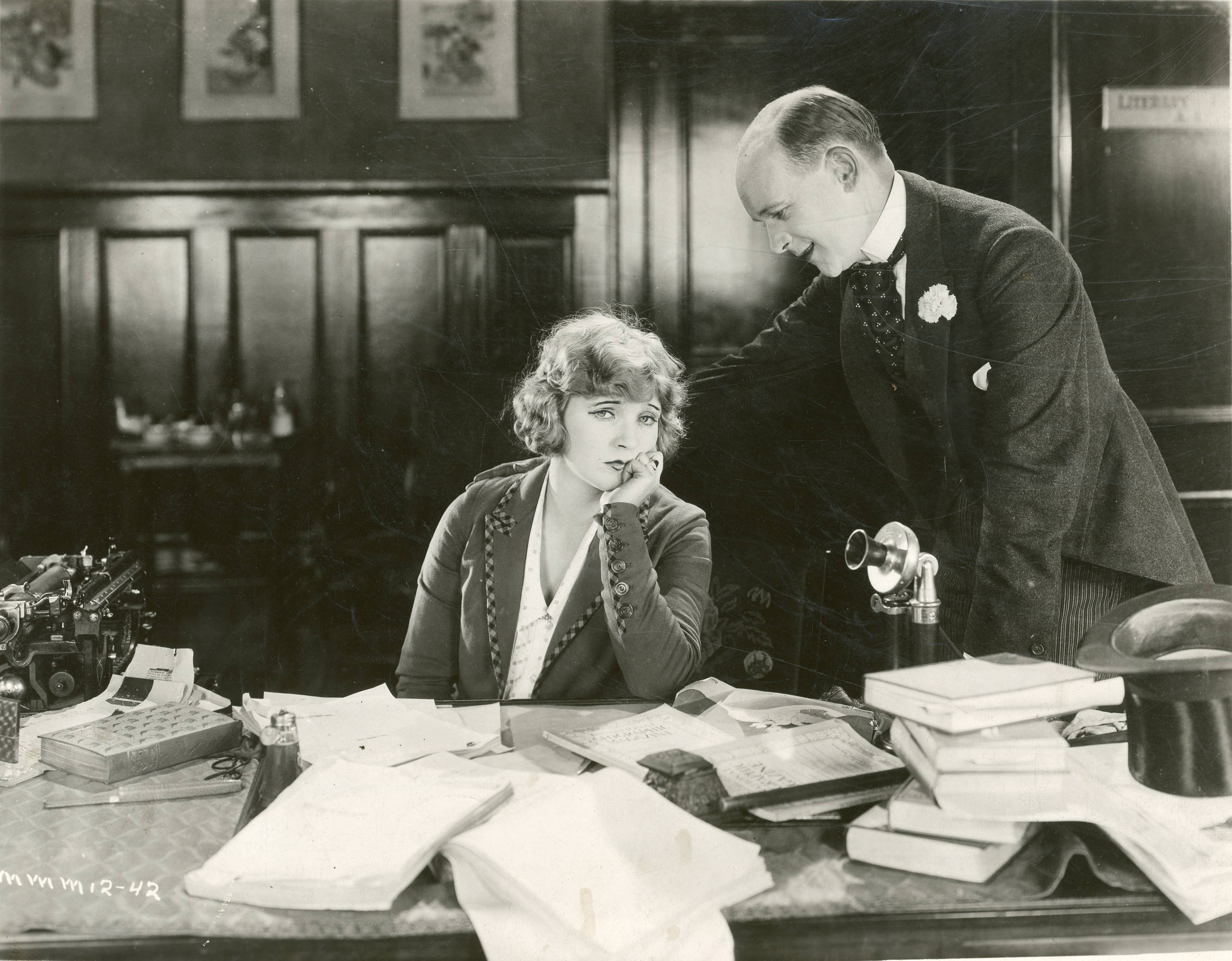
Mary Miles Minter in "Her Winning Way" (1921)

As described in various film magazine reviews, Ann Annington is a book reviewer working for a magazine publishing firm, who send her to interview author Harold Hargrave. Hargrave is notoriously reticent and refuses the interview, so Ann decides to obtain the necessary information by other means.

Dressing up as a maid, Ann obtains a position in Hargrave's apartment and sets about seducing him, even suggesting that he kiss her in order to be able to write about romance more convincingly. She begins to find out the details that her publishing company wants to know, but she also finds out that she is falling in love with Hargrave.

Ann discovers that Hargrave's mother is pushing him into a marriage with Evangeline, an intellectual but plain young woman. To save him from this unwanted marriage, Ann plants certain items of scanty feminine attire about Hargrave's bedroom, and when Evangeline finds these she promptly calls off the engagement. Ann's suitor Lloyd also ends his relationship with her due to her evident feelings for Hargrave.

Hargrave learns of Ann's role at the paper, and, knowing that she is responsible for the end of his engagement, demands that she leave his premises. However, when he returns, she is still there. When she promises not to publish the information she has obtained about his private life, and convinces him of her true feelings, he forgives her, and all ends happily.

== Cast ==
- Mary Miles Minter as Ann Annington
- Gaston Glass as Harold Hargrave
- Carrie Clark Ward as Nora
- Fred Goodwins as Sylvester Lloyd
- Helen Dunbar as Mrs. Hargrave
- Grace Morse as Evangeline
- John Elliott as Mallon
- Omar Whitehead as Dr. Claude Gravat
