= Saturday Night (1922 film) =

1922 American romantic comedy film

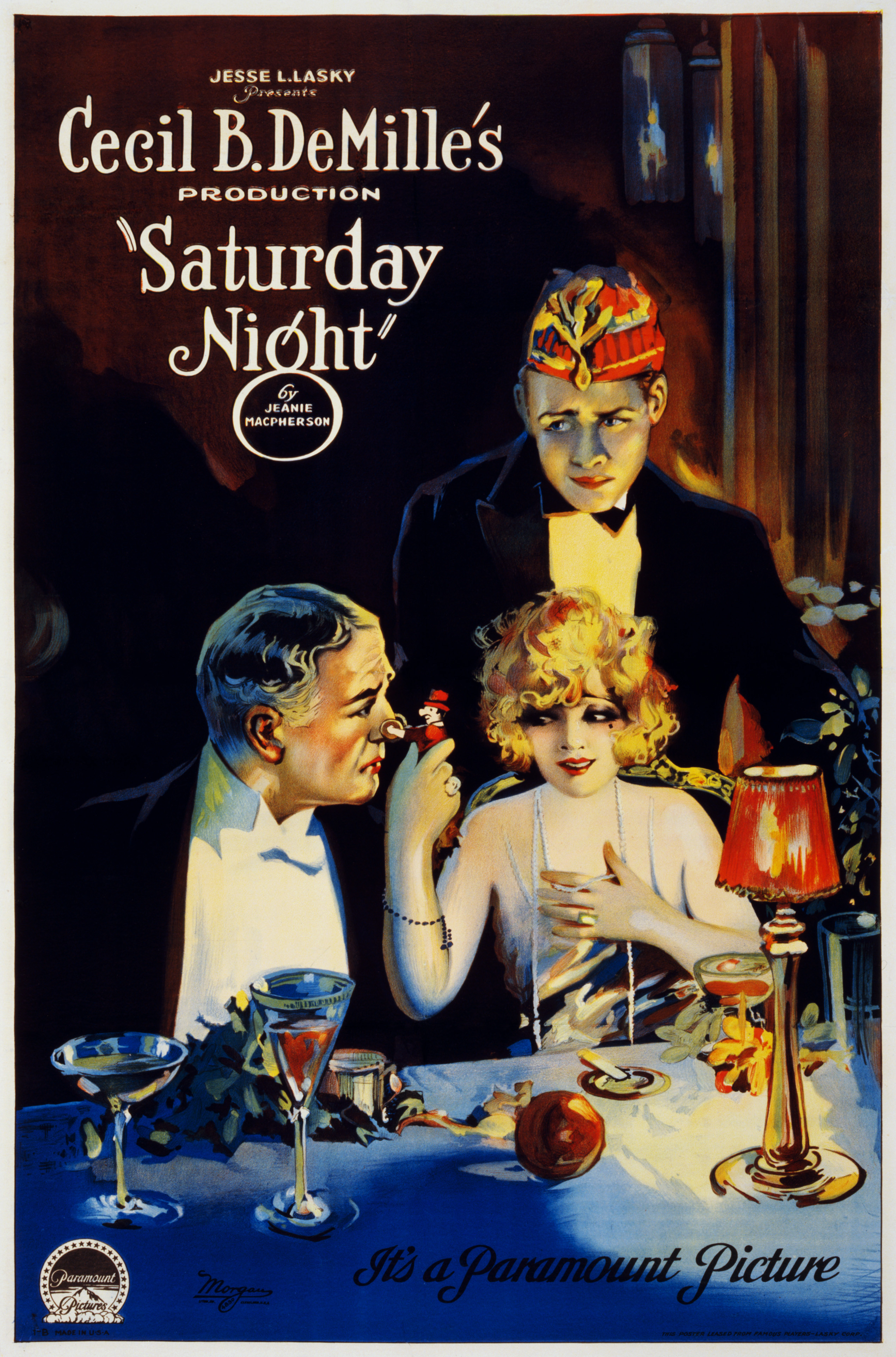
- Film poster
- Directed by: Cecil B. DeMille
- Written by: Jeanie MacPherson
- Screenplay by: Jeanie MacPherson
- Story by: Jeanie MacPherson
- Produced by: Cecil B. DeMille
- Starring: Leatrice Joy; Conrad Nagel; Edith Roberts
- Cinematography: Karl Struss; Alvin Wyckoff
- Edited by: Anne Bauchens
- Production company: Famous Players–Lasky Corporation
- Distributed by: Paramount Pictures
- Release date: January 29, 1922
- Running time: 9 reels
- Country: United States
- Language: Silent (English intertitles)
- Budget: $224,635
- Box office: $753,807.83

Saturday Night (full film; Dutch intertitles)

Saturday Night is a 1922 American silent romantic comedy film directed by Cecil B. DeMille and starring Leatrice Joy, Conrad Nagel, and Edith Roberts. It was Leatrice Joy's first film with DeMille.

== Plot ==
Shamrock O'Day, a poor laundress dreams of a marrying a rich man. Her neighbour Tom McGuire, the chauffeur of socialite Iris van Suydam, is secretly in love with his mistress. On the other side of the city, Iris is not happy with her pampered life and she dreams of living in a vine-covered cottage. Her rich young fiancé Richard Prentiss is just as tired of women of her class as she is bored with men of his.

When Shamrock comes to deliver laundry at Richard's house, she meets him by chance and he falls in love with her. He proposes to drive her home and tells Iris to wait for him. She decides to go for a picnic with her chauffeur Tom and, after letting her car being crushed by a train, falls into Tom's arms. In the evening, Richard provocatively dances at a formal party with Shamrock, which causes his sister Elsie to announce her brother's engagement to Iris. Tom, having read the announcement in the press wants to leave Iris's service but she tells him she wants to marry him. The fact that her rich uncle clear all her allowances and she is left without a penny does not deter her. As soon as he hears the news, Richard decides to marry Shamrock.

Soon, Shamrock, who feels she is despised by Richard's family and friends is almost as desperate as Iris who must live in a tiny apartment next to a railway and spend her time cooking and cleaning. She decides to hire Tom as her chauffeur despite Richard and Iris's opposition. One evening, they go together to Coney Island. When they come back, they find Richard and Iris waiting for them. Iris tells Richard they are too different to live together. While Richard and Iris try to persuade their spouses that they love them, a fire breaks out. Richard saves Iris's life.

Seven years later, Shamrock and Tom are happily married and have several children, while Richard and Iris are still pondering whether it is time to mend their broken engagement.

== Cast ==
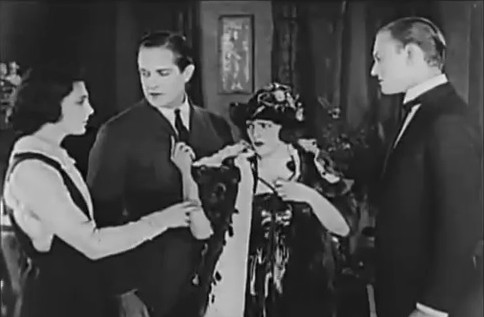
Leatrice Joy, Jack Mower, Edith Roberts and Conrad Nagel in Saturday Night (1922)

- Leatrice Joy as Iris Van Suydam
- Conrad Nagel as Richard Prentiss
- Edith Roberts as Shamrock O'Day
- Jack Mower as Tom McGuire
- Julia Faye as Elsie Prentiss
- Edythe Chapman as Mrs. Prentiss
- Theodore Roberts as Uncle
- Sylvia Ashton as Mrs. O'Day
- John Davidson as The Count Demitry Scardoff
- James Neill as Tompkins
- Winter Hall as The Professor
- Lillian Leighton as Mrs. Ferguson
- William Boyd (uncredited)
- Viora Daniel (uncredited)

== Preservation and Availability ==
Complete prints of Saturday Night are held by:

- Cinematheque Royale de Belgique
- George Eastman Museum (on 35 mm film)
- EYE Filmmuseum
- UCLA Film and Television Archive (on 35 mm film)
- Academy Film Archive (on video)
- Indiana University Bloomington (on 16 mm film )

In 2014, it was released on DVD by Alpha Home Entertainment.
