= Yorke Film Corporation =

American film company

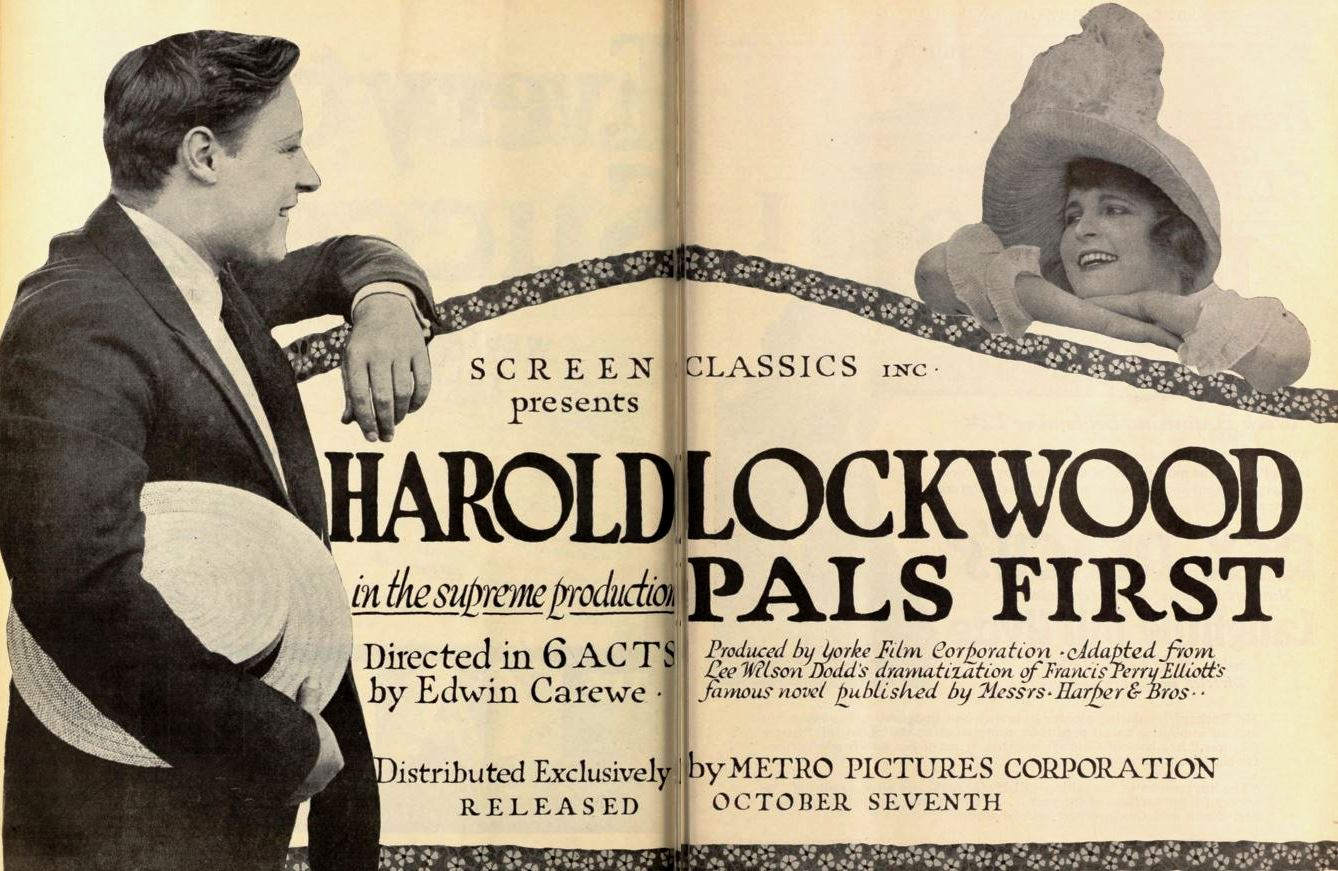
Ad for Pals First

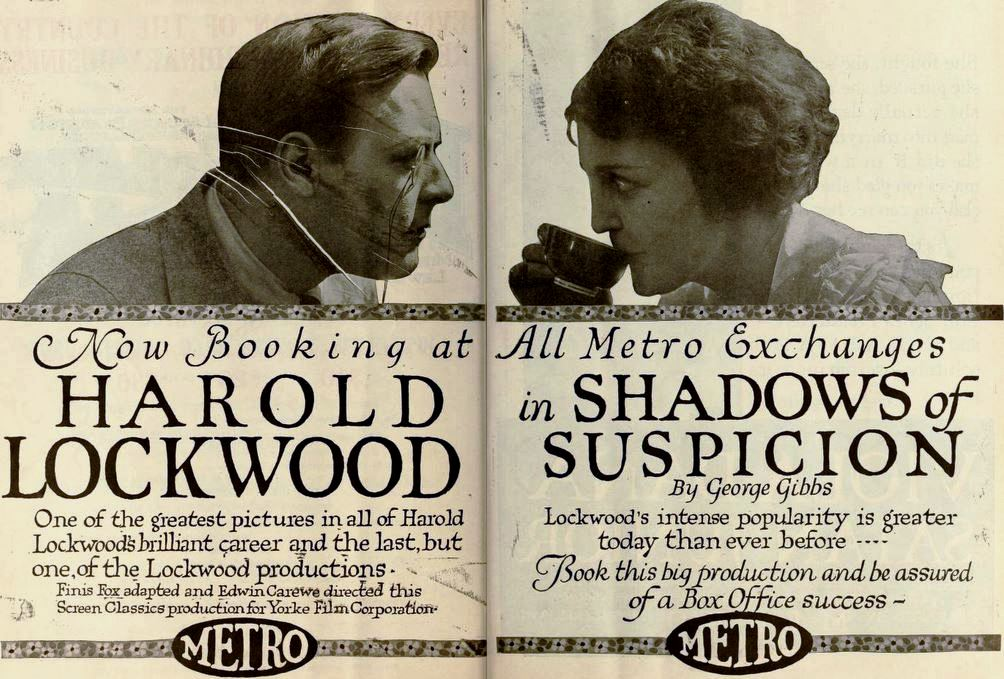
Advertisement for Shadows of Suspicion, Lockwood's last film as he died of influenza during production

Yorke Film Corporation was a film company. The company's films were distributed by Metro Pictures. Fred J. Balshofer and Joseph Engel were involved with the company. Balshofer formed the company to produce films pairing the popular Harold Lockwood and May Allison. Lockwood died of influenza in 1918. The company relocated to Los Angeles and took over a studio from Nevada Film Company.

A photograph of Lockwood with two child actors was taken during production of Big Tremaine.

On December 2, 1916, May Allison was featured on the cover of Motography while she was part of Yorke Film Company.

Many of the films were shot on location.

== Filmography ==
- The Masked Rider (1916),
- Pidgin Island (1916),
- Big Tremaine (1916)
- Mister 44 (1916)
- The River of Romance (1916 film)
- Paradise Garden (1917)
- The Hidden Spring (1917)
- The Avenging Trail (1917)
- The Promise (1917)
- The Winding Trail (1918 film)
- The Landloper (1918)
- Lend Me Your Name (1918)
- Pals First (1918)
- Broadway Bill (1918 film)
- Shadows of Suspicion (1919)
- The Great Romance (film) (1919)
- A Man of Honor (1919)
- The Haunted Pajamas (1917), a follow-up to Hidden Spring
- The Promise (Yorke film)
- Under Handicap
- Broadway Bill
- The Square Deceiver (1917)
- The Hidden Spring (1917)
