= The Hidden Children =

- Directed by: Oscar Apfel
- Written by: Robert W. Chambers (novel); Oscar Apfel
- Starring: Harold Lockwood; May Allison; Lillian West
- Cinematography: Tony Gaudio
- Production company: Yorke Film Corporation
- Distributed by: Metro Pictures
- Release date: March 26, 1917
- Running time: 50 minutes
- Country: United States
- Languages: Silent; English intertitles

The Hidden Children is a 1917 American silent historical drama film directed by Oscar Apfel and starring Harold Lockwood, May Allison and Lillian West. It is based on a 1914 novel by Robert W. Chambers, set in Colonial America. Location shooting took place in the San Bernardino Mountains.

== Cast ==
- Harold Lockwood as Evan Loskiel
- May Allison as Lois de Contrecoeur
- Lillian West as Jeeanne de Contrrecoeur
- Henry Hebert as Mayaro
- George A. McDaniel as Amochol
- Lester Cuneo as Lt. Boyd
- Albert Ellis as Cavert
- Lillian Hayward as Mrs. Rannock
- Howard Davies as Gen. Sullivan
- Daniel Davis as Hiaowoc
- Clara Lucas as Marie Loskiel
- Arthur Allardt as Capt. Jean de Contrecoeur
- Charles Cummings as Guy Johnson

== Bibliography ==
- Lowe, Denise. An Encyclopedic Dictionary of Women in Early American Films: 1895-1930. Routledge, 2014.
