= Broadway Bill (1918 film) =

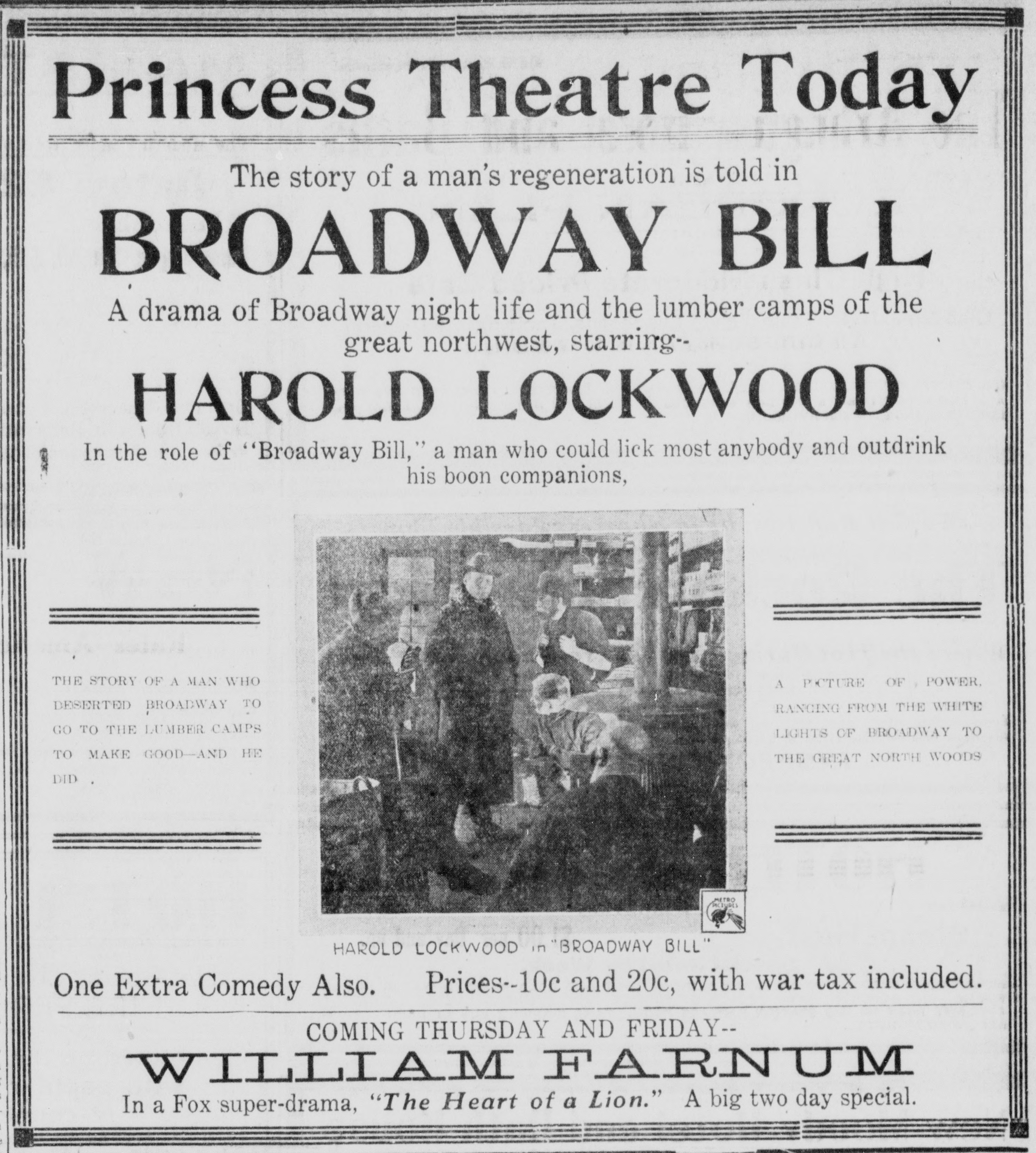
- Contemporary newspaper advertisement
- Directed by: Fred J. Balshofer
- Written by: Fred J. Balshofer
- Starring: Harold Lockwood; May Allison; Pomeroy Cannon; Lester Cuneo; Fred L. Wilson
- Cinematography: Tony Gaudio
- Production company: Yorke Film Corporation
- Distributed by: Metro Pictures
- Release date: February 11, 1918
- Running time: 50 minutes; 5 reels
- Country: United States
- Languages: Silent film (English intertitles)

Broadway Bill is a 1918 American silent romantic drama film directed by Fred J. Balshofer and starring Harold Lockwood, May Allison, Pomeroy Cannon, Lester Cuneo, and Fred L. Wilson. The film was released by Metro Pictures on February 11, 1918.

== Cast ==
- Harold Lockwood as 'Broadway Bill' Clayton
- Martha Mansfield as Muriel Latham
- Cornish Beck as Jack Latham
- Raymond Hadley as Godfrey St. Cleve (as Raymond C. Hadley)
- Stanton Heck as Buck Hardigan
- Bert Starkey as Creed
- William Black as John Underwood (as W.W. Black)
- Tom Blake as 'Irish' Fallon
- William Clifford as Daddy Dunningan
- Artie Ortego as Wabishke (as Art Ortego)

== Preservation ==
The film is now considered lost.
