= The Square Deceiver =

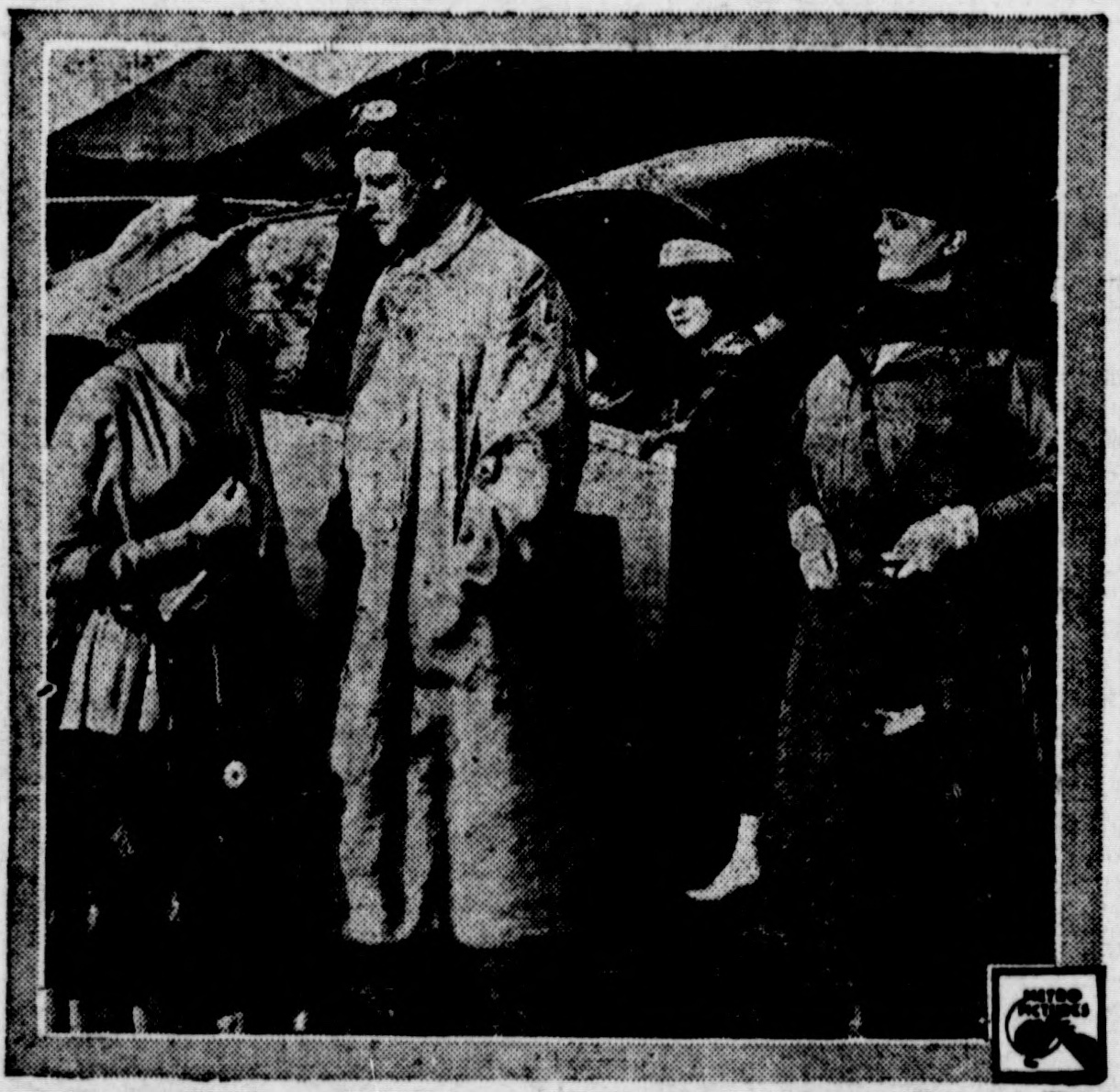
- Scene from the film published in a contemporary newspaper
- Directed by: Fred J. Balshofer
- Written by: Francis Perry Elliott (novel); Fred J. Balshofer; Richard V. Spencer
- Starring: Harold Lockwood; Pauline Curley; William Clifford
- Cinematography: Tony Gaudio
- Production company: Yorke Film Corporation
- Distributed by: Metro Pictures
- Release date: December 3, 1917
- Running time: 50 minutes
- Country: United States
- Language: Silent

The Square Deceiver is a 1917 American silent romantic comedy film directed by Fred J. Balshofer and starring Harold Lockwood, Pauline Curley and William Clifford.

== Cast ==
- Harold Lockwood as Billy Van Dyke
- Pauline Curley as Beatrice Forsythe
- William Clifford as William Pugfeather
- Dora Mills Adams as Mrs. Pugfeather
- Kathryn Hutchinson as Celia Pugfeather
- Betty Marvin as Edith Van Dyke
- Richard L'Estrange as Dick Blakesley

== Bibliography ==
- Lowe, Denise. An Encyclopedic Dictionary of Women in Early American Films: 1895–1930. Routledge, 2014.
