= The River of Romance (1916 film) =

Silent drama film directed by Henry Otto

The River of Romance (aka: One Cylinder Sam)
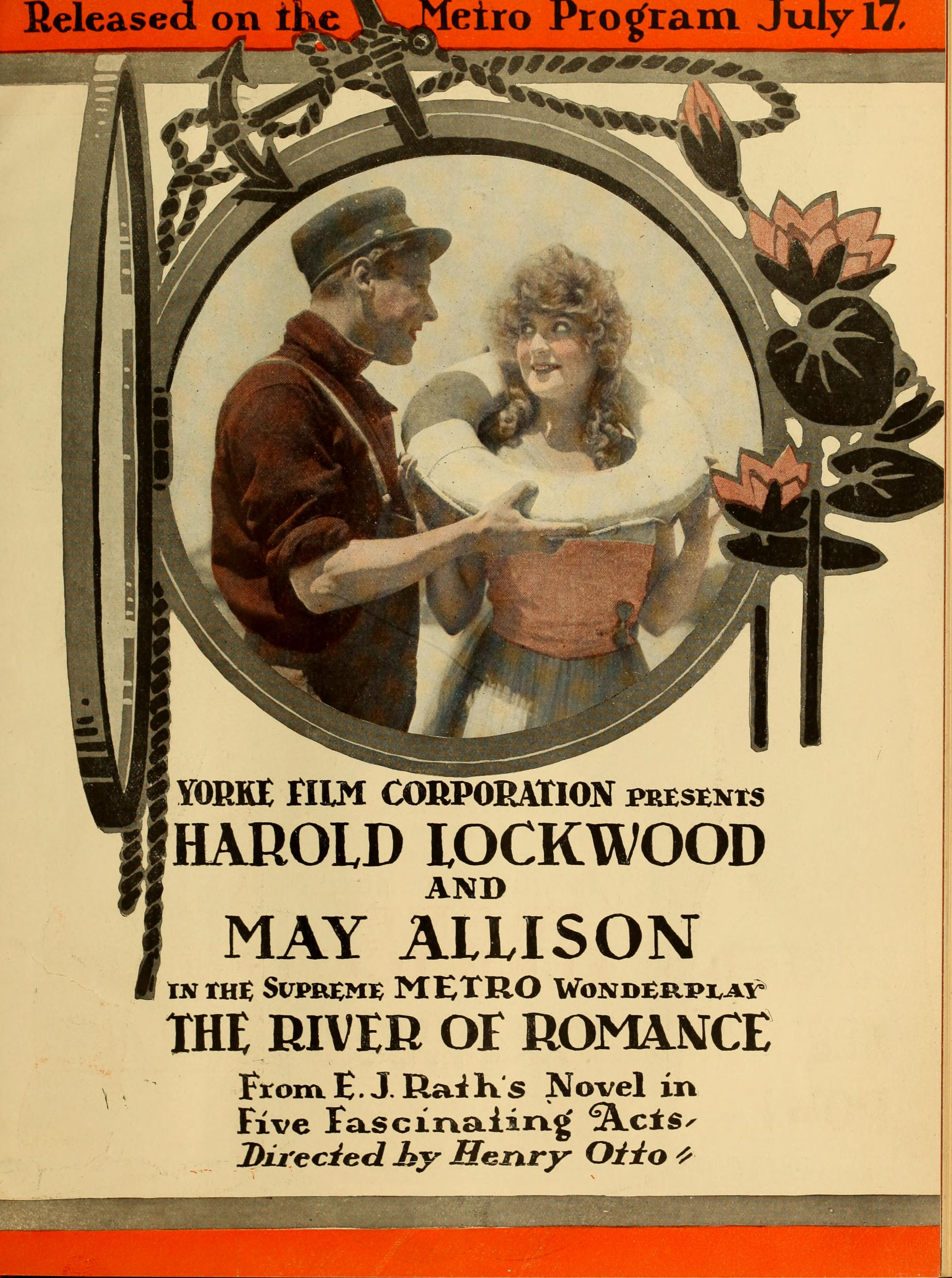
- Directed by: Henry Otto
- Written by: Henry Otto
- Based on: novel Sam by E. J. Rath
- Produced by: Yorke Film Corporation
- Starring: Harold Lockwood; May Allison
- Cinematography: Tony Gaudio
- Distributed by: Metro Pictures
- Release date: July 17, 1916
- Running time: 5 reels
- Country: USA
- Language: Silent..English titles

The River of Romance is a 1916 silent film drama directed by Henry Otto and distributed by Metro Pictures. The film starred Harold Lockwood and May Allison.

== Cast ==
- Harold Lockwood - William Kissam Kellogg, aka Sam
- May Allison - Rosalind Chalmers
- Lester Cuneo - Reginald Williams
- A. H. Busby - Henry Davidson (*as Bert Busby)
- Lee Walker - Stephen Witherbee
- Mathilde Brundage - Mrs. Stephen Witherbee (*as Mrs. Mathilde Brundage)
- Lilliam Halperin - Polly Witherbee
- Philip W. Masi - Tom Witherbee (*as Phil Masi)
- Dan Hanlon - Butler

== Preservation status ==
- A copy is held in the foreign archive, Archives du Film du CNC Bois d'Arcy.
