= Broken Cross =

Broken Cross may refer to:

- Broken Cross, Cheshire, village in England
- "Broken Cross" (song), a song by the Architects from the album Lost Forever // Lost Together
- The Broken Cross (1911 film), a film by D. W. Griffith
- The Broken Cross (1916 film), a film by Tom Ricketts
- The Broken Cross: The Hidden Hand In The Vatican: a 1983 book of Piers Compton
