= Alice Rooney =

Alice Rooney may refer to:

- Alice Ann Rooney, actress
- Alice Owen Rooney, character in About Adam
