= Castles in the Air (1919 film) =

1919 American silent comedy film, directed by George D. Baker

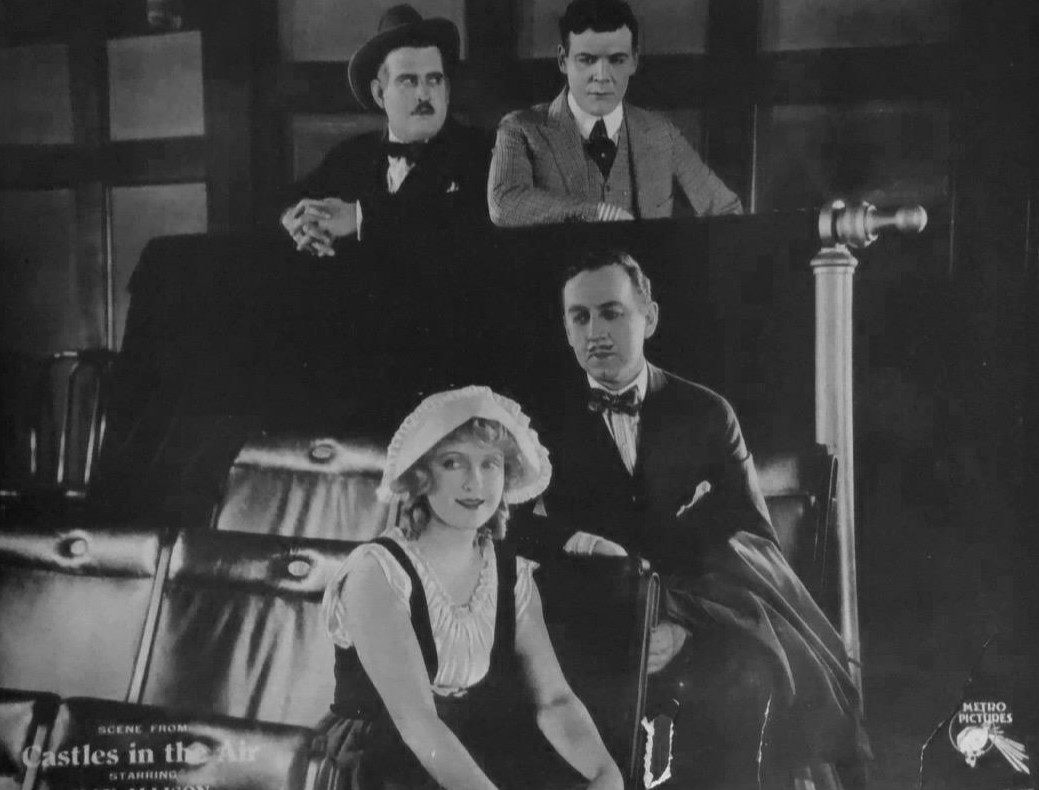
- Directed by: George D. Baker
- Written by: George D. Baker
- Based on: the short story, "Orchestra D-2" by F. M. Vermilye
- Starring: May Allison; Ben Wilson; Clarence Burton
- Cinematography: William Fildew
- Production company: Metro Pictures
- Distributed by: Metro Pictures
- Release date: May 12, 1919 (US)
- Running time: 5 reels
- Country: United States
- Language: English

Castles in the Air, also known by its working title Orchestra D-2, is a 1919 American silent comedy film, directed by George D. Baker. It stars May Allison, Ben Wilson, and Clarence Burton, and was released on May 12, 1919 by Metro Pictures.

== Plot ==
Fortuna Donnelly is an usherette in the Halcyon theater, where the theater's manager, Eddie Lintner is smitten with her. However, she is also pursued by Owen Pauncefort, a wealthy Englishman. She chooses to focus her attention on Pauncefort. After he wines and dines her, and makes sexual advances towards her, she finds out that he is married and estranged from his wife. When confronted, he apologizes and says that he has been searching for his wife. Fortuna returns to the theater where she orchestrates Pauncefort being seated next to his wife during a show, reuniting the two. Lintner continues his pursuit of Fortuna, and the two end up together.

== Cast ==
- May Allison as Fortuna Donnelly
- Ben Wilson as Eddie Lintner
- Clarence Burton as John McArthur
- Walter I. Percival as the Honorable Owen Pauncefort
- Irene Rich as Mrs. Owen Pauncefort
- Mother Anderson as Mrs. Larrymore
- Viola Dolan as Esther Jones
- Ruth Maurice as Lucy Dalton

== Reception ==
Exhibitors Herald gave the film a lukewarm review, saying that it had a "tendency to drag" and a "pronounced familiarity plot outline", but it did "hold the interest until the finish". Variety, on the other hand, gave the film a positive review, calling the plot "a novelty", and saying that the film "holds the interest from the beginning".

== Preservation status ==
No prints of the film appear to have survived making it a lost film.
