= James R. Quirk =

American magazine editor (1884 - 1932)

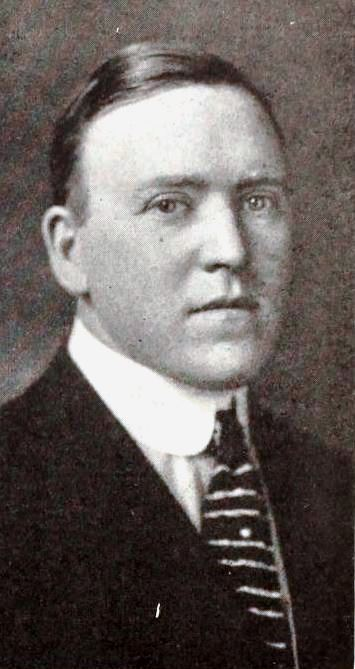
- From a 1920 magazine
- Born: 4 September 1884; Boston, Massachusetts
- Died: 1 August 1932 (aged 47)
- Resting place: Kensico Cemetery, Valhalla, New York (Westchester County)
- Other name: "Father of the Fans"
- Occupations: editor, publisher
- Years active: 1911-1932
- Spouses: Elizabeth North; May Allison
- Children: Frances; Jean; James (died as infant)

James R. Quirk (September 4, 1884 – August 1, 1932) was an American magazine editor.

== Career ==
Quirk was the vice president and editor of Photoplay magazine, one of the earliest film or fan glamour magazines and particularly popular in the silent film era. Quirk had been with the magazine since its founding in 1911. Quirk's magazine had many popular rivals such as Motion Picture Magazine, Modern Screen, Classic Screen, Screenland, Movie Story, Screen Book, Silver Screen, Moving Picture Stories, Theatre Magazine, Screen Play, Picture Play, Screen Guide, and The Moving Picture World.

Quirk had also been editor of the first Washington Times prior to his involvement with Photoplay and editor of the periodical Popular Mechanics during his involvement with Photoplay. For two years (1928–30) he was publisher of The Smart Set magazine.

He was the uncle of Lawrence J. Quirk who gave out an annual award in James's memory that covered many aspects of the film business.

== Personal ==
Quirk was of Irish descent. He was married to Elizabeth North with whom he had 3 children, Frances, Jean, and James (died as infant). Quirk was the second husband of film star May Allison from 1926 until his death in 1932.

== Death ==
Quirk died August 1, 1932, of bronchial pneumonia and heart disease. He was memorialized in the October 1932 Photoplay. He had also been a hard drinker. He is buried at Kensico Cemetery, Valhalla, New York. The cemetery is last resting place to many famous Broadway and film celebrities.
