= Pidgin Island =

1916 silent film by Fred J. Balshofer

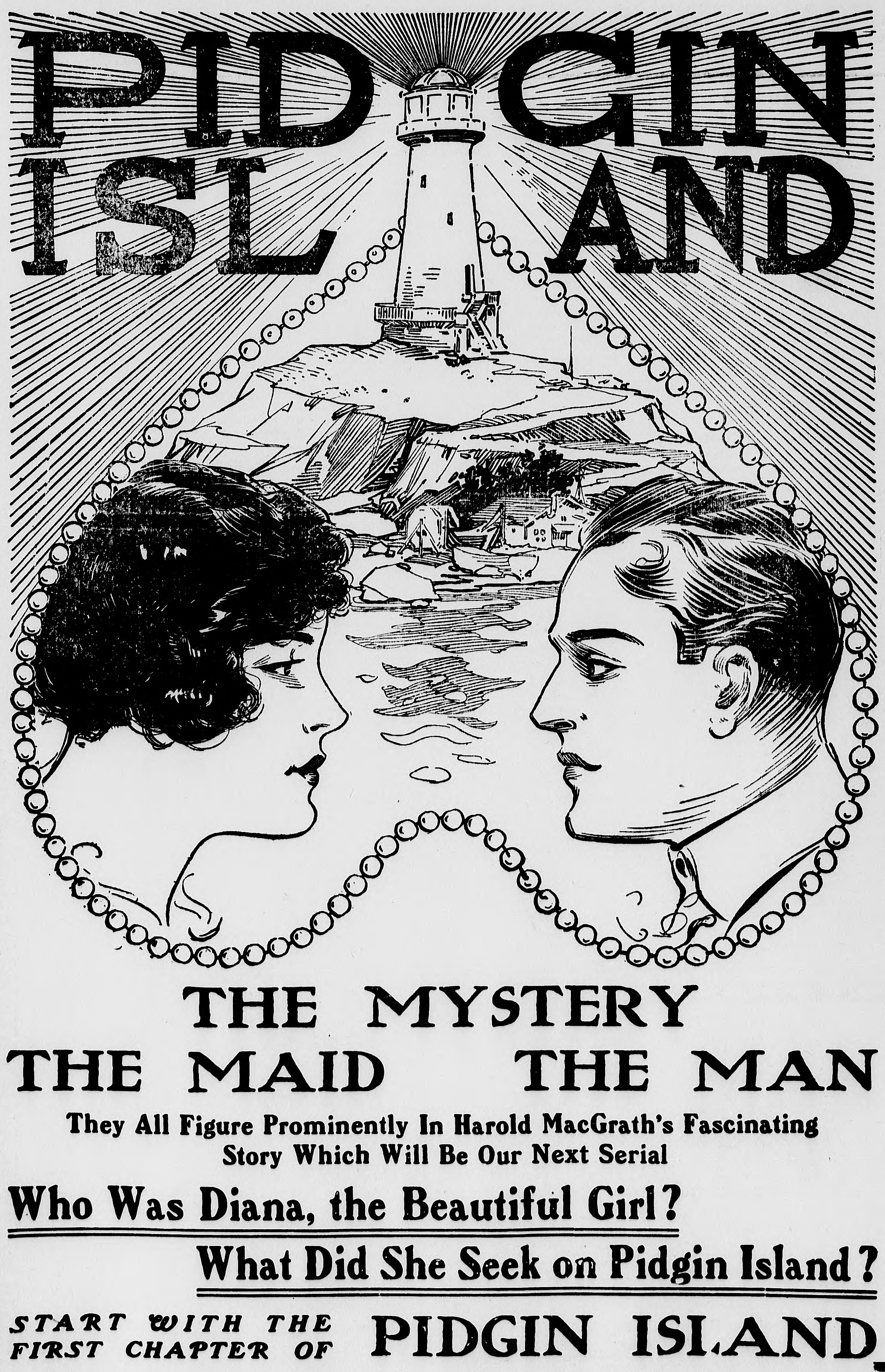
- Contemporary advertisement
- Directed by: Fred J. Balshofer
- Written by: Fred J. Balshofer; Richard V. Spencer
- Based on: Pidgin Island by Harold MacGrath
- Starring: Harold Lockwood; May Allison; Pomeroy Cannon; Lester Cuneo; Fred L. Wilson
- Cinematography: Tony Gaudio
- Production company: Yorke Film Corporation
- Distributed by: Metro Pictures
- Release date: December 25, 1916
- Running time: 50 minutes; 5 reels
- Country: United States
- Languages: Silent film (English intertitles)

Pidgin Island is a 1916 American silent romantic drama film directed by Fred J. Balshofer and starring Harold Lockwood, May Allison, Pomeroy Cannon, Lester Cuneo, and Fred L. Wilson. It is based on the 1914 novel of the same name by Harold MacGrath. The film was released by Metro Pictures on December 25, 1916.

== Cast ==
- Harold Lockwood as John Cranford
- May Allison as Diana Wynne
- Pomeroy Cannon as Michael Smead
- Lester Cuneo as Donald Smead
- Fred L. Wilson as Uncle Billy
- Lillian Hayward as Uncle Billy's wife
- Elijah Zerr as Lester
- Yukio Aoyama as Wah Sing
- Virginia Lee Corbin

== Preservation ==
A print is prepared and preserved by MGM.
