= The Great Question =

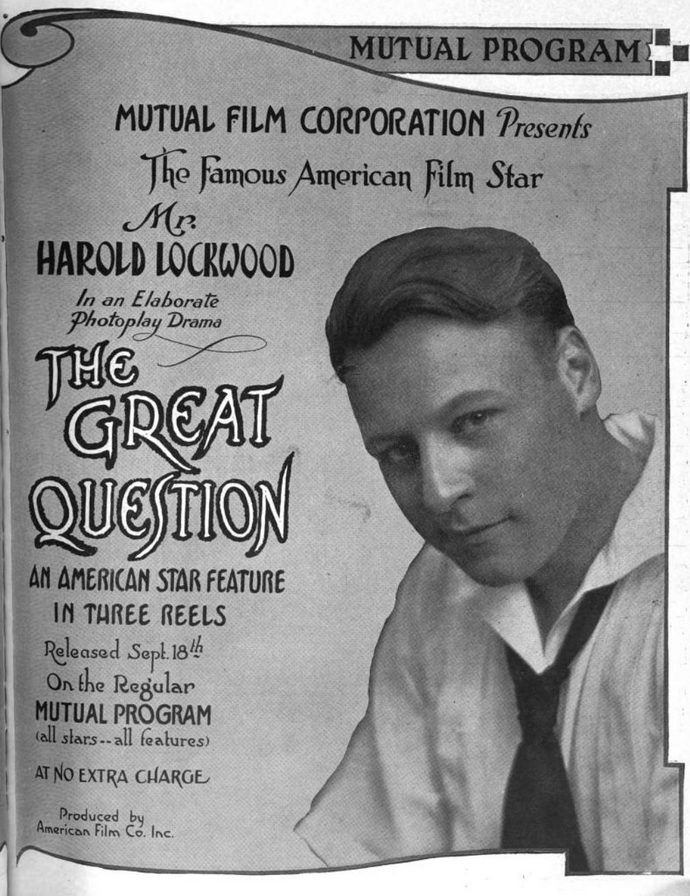
- A print advertisement for The Great Question, featuring Harold Lockwood
- Directed by: Thomas Ricketts
- Written by: Thomas Ricketts
- Starring: Harold Lockwood; May Allison; Harry von Meter
- Distributed by: Mutual Film
- Release date: September 18, 1915
- Country: United States
- Languages: Silent film English intertitles

The Great Question is a 1915 American silent short romantic drama film written and directed by Thomas Ricketts. The film stars Harold Lockwood, May Allison, Harry von Meter, William Stowell, Eugenie Forde, and Charles Bartlett.
