= The Telephone Girl (1927 film) =

1927 film

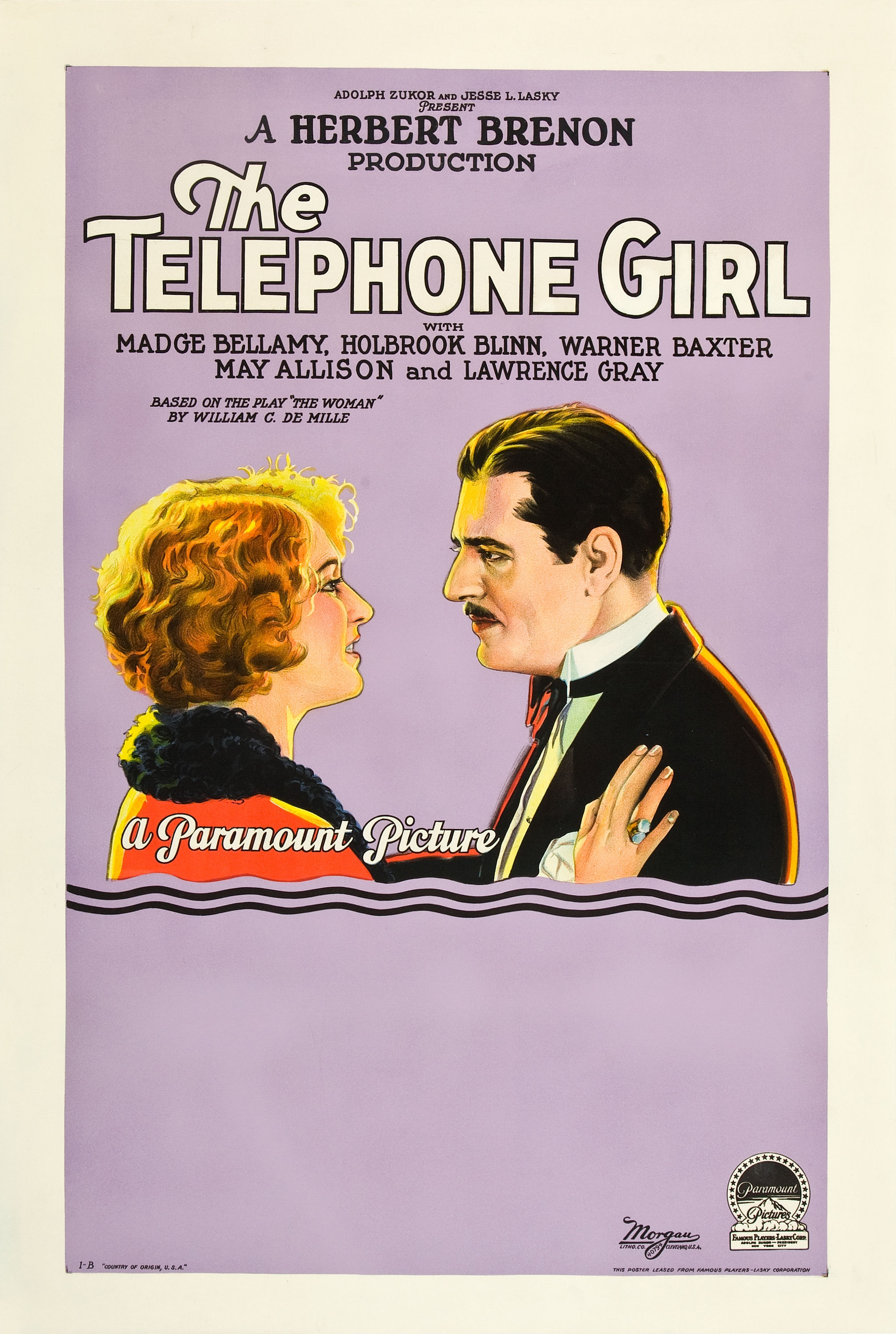
- Theatrical poster
- Directed by: Herbert Brenon
- Written by: Elizabeth Meehan (scenario)
- Based on: The Woman by William C. deMille
- Produced by: Herbert Brenon
- Starring: Madge Bellamy
- Cinematography: Leo Tover
- Production company: Famous Players–Lasky
- Distributed by: Paramount Pictures
- Release date: March 26, 1927
- Running time: 60 minutes
- Country: United States
- Language: Silent (English intertitles)

The Telephone Girl is a 1927 American silent drama film directed by Herbert Brenon, produced by Famous Players–Lasky, released by Paramount Pictures, and based on the play The Woman (1911) by William C. deMille. This film starred Madge Bellamy, Holbrook Blinn, and Warner Baxter.

== Cast ==
- Madge Bellamy as Kitty O'Brien
- Holbrook Blinn as Jim Blake
- Warner Baxter as Matthew Standish
- May Allison as Grace Robinson
- Lawrence Gray as Tom Blake
- Hale Hamilton as Mark
- Hamilton Revelle as Van Dyke
- William E. Shay as Detective
- Karen Hansen as Mrs. Standish

== Preservation status ==
This film is preserved at EYE Institute in (also known as the Filmmuseum) in Amsterdam.
