= Lillo of the Sulu Seas =

1916 short film by Tom Ricketts

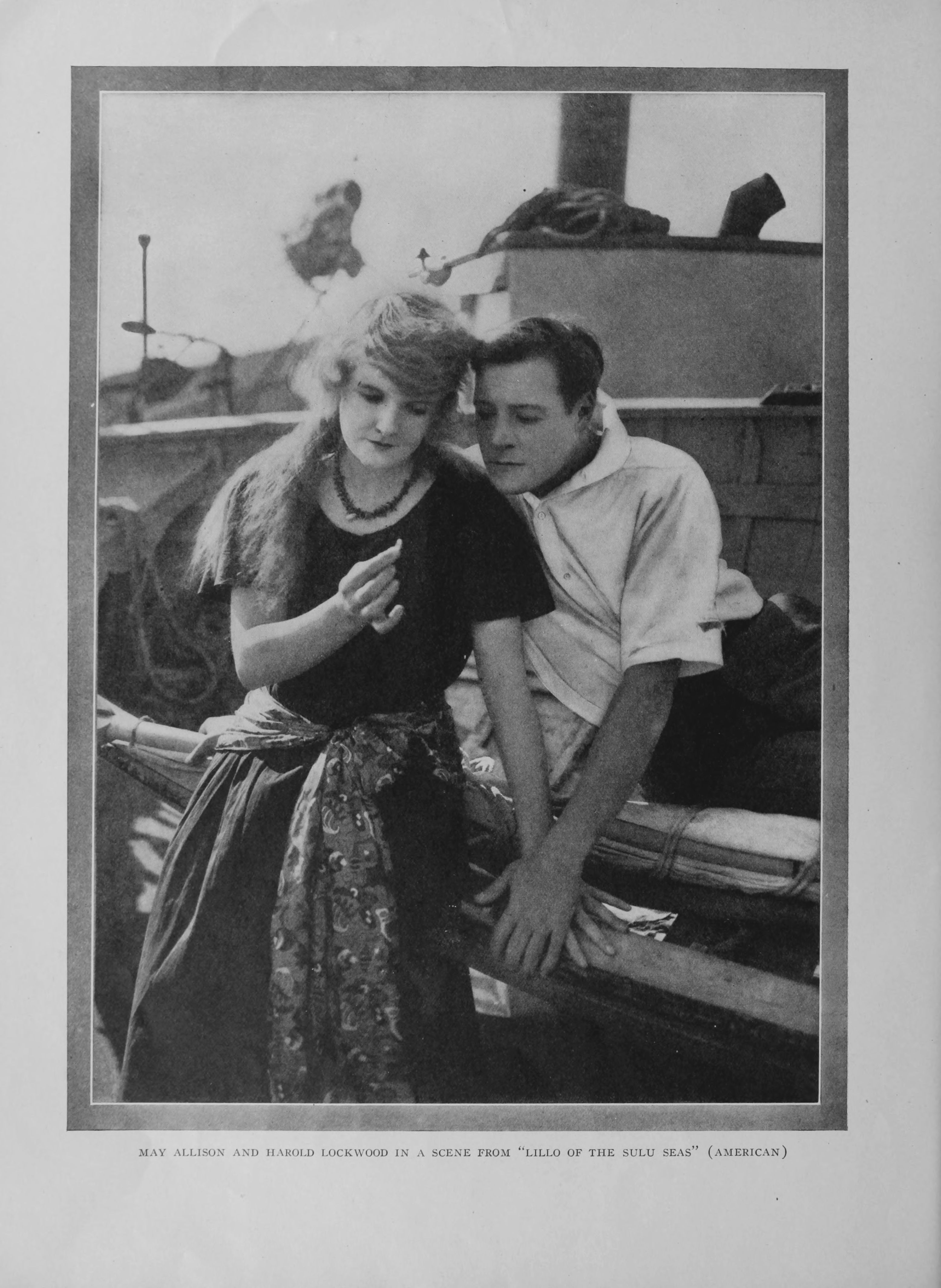
- Still with May Allison and Harold Lockwood
- Directed by: Thomas Ricketts
- Written by: Thomas Ricketts
- Starring: Harold Lockwood; May Allison
- Distributed by: Mutual Film
- Release date: February 1, 1916
- Running time: 3 reels
- Country: United States
- Language: Silent (English intertitles)

Lillo of the Sulu Seas is a 1916 American silent short romance film written and directed by Thomas Ricketts. The film stars Harold Lockwood and May Allison.

== Plot ==
As reported in a film review in a newspaper, Lillo is a pearl diver who wins a man from New York for a husband. She is restored to her father as result of a shipwreck which lands her upon a desert island.

== Cast ==
- Harold Lockwood as Ralph Holt
- May Allison as Lillo
- William Stowell as Jeb Foster
- Perry Banks as Pahui
- Harry von Meter as Captain Rand

== Censorship ==
Like many American films of the time, Lillo of the Sulu Seas was subject to cuts by city and state film censorship boards. For example, the Ohio Board of Censors required a cut of the scene where man puts drug into glass and pours wine on it, a cut to three feet all scenes showing men almost nude, cut of a fight scene to three feet, and all fight scenes in the third reel. The censor board of Paterson, New Jersey, banned the display of the posters for the film.
