= Clarence Burton =

American actor (1882–1933)

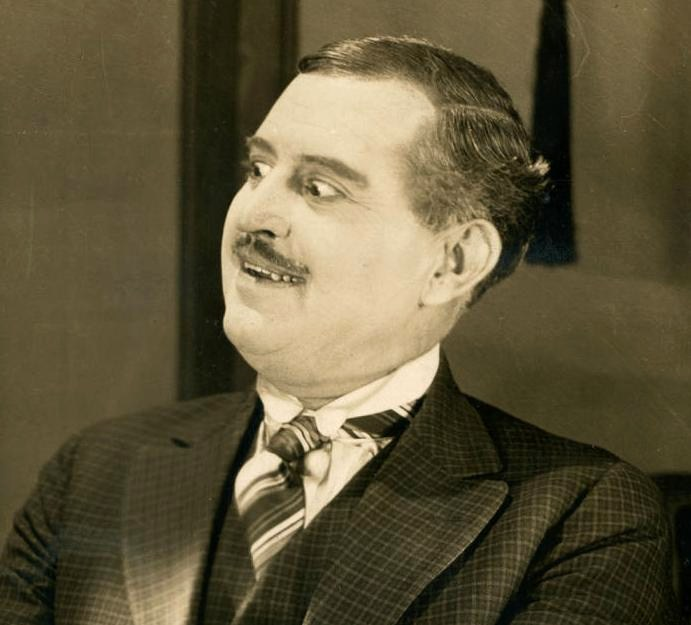
- Burton in Miss Lulu Bett (1921)
- Born: Clarence Forrest Burton; March 10, 1882; Fort Lyon, Benton County, Missouri, U.S.
- Died: December 1, 1933 (aged 51); Los Angeles, California, U.S.
- Occupation: Actor
- Years active: 1913–1932

Clarence Forrest Burton (May 10, 1882 – December 1, 1933 (Note: Some published sources give Burton's date of death as December 2, 1933 in Hollywood, Los Angeles. However this is contradicted in his obituary in the Los Angeles Evening Citizen News which was published on December 2, 1933. It states he died a day earlier on December 1, 1933 at his home in Northeast Los Angeles.)) was an American actor, dancer, and singer. The son of minstrel show performers John and Lottie Burton, he grew up as a child entertainer in the Burton Family vaudeville act performing with his parents and sister. By 1904 he was performing without his family, and continued to work as a dancer in vaudeville until approximately 1910. By 1907 he had diversified his work into performing as an actor and comedian in both plays and musicals. After working in regional theatre in California he moved into work as a silent film actor in 1912. He appeared in more than 100 films released between the years 1913 and 1932; often working in collaboration with Cecil B. DeMille.

== Biography ==
The son of John and Lottie Burton, Clarence Forrest Burton was born in Fort Lyon, Benton County, Missouri on May 10, 1882. He began his career as a child actor at the age of 5. His parent were entertainers who performed plantation songs together in blackface minstrel shows and in vaudeville theaters. His parents were actively performing until their retirement in 1914. The family's real surname was Norris not Burton which they had adopted for the stage.

By 1894 Clarence was working in vaudeville in an act performed with Baby May, his sister. In 1895 he was billed as a baritone singer in advertisements for the show the Burton Family Combination, and 1898 report of the show referred to him as "the boy baritone". From 1899-1902 the Burton family were periodically engaged at the Olympic Theatre in Chicago with Clarence performing buck dance and soft shoe. In a 1901 advertisement for the family's vaudeville appearance in Cleveland, Clarence was billed as performing "trick buck and wing dancing".

By 1904 Clarence was headlining in vaudeville in Illinois by himself as a dancer, and in 1905 he was billed as both a singer and dancer as the headline act at the Star Theatre in Muncie, Indiana. In 1905 he was engaged in vaudeville at the Grand Theatre in Joliet, Illinois the Olympic Theatre in Chicago, the Peoples' Theatre in Cedar Rapid, Iowa, and the Majestic Theatre in Houston, Texas; remaining at the latter theater into 1906. That year he also performed in vaudeville theaters in Ohio and Illinois. He remained periodically active as a traveling vaudeville dancer over the next several years, while branching out into work as a comedian and musical theatre actor. In 1907 he portrayed the Butler in a touring production of the musical The Telephone Girl, and performed the role of the lawyer Sleigh in the farce Too Many Wives in regional theatre in New Mexico. In 1908 he was a member of the Eckhardt Ideal Players; a stock theatre company active in California and Oregon.

In 1909 Burton starred in the musical Papa's Boy at the opera house in Woodland, California, and appeared as a tap dancer in vaudeville in Indiana Kentucky, Ohio, Pennsylvania, Michigan, and New York state. In 1910 he starred in the leading comic role of Adam Schwindler in Aaron Hoffman and J. A. Raynes musical The Politicians at the Empire Theatre in Fresno, California. This was followed by other leading parts at that same venue, including roles in The Merry Liars and Getting the Coin. In 1911 he was active as a musical theatre comedian with the Spalding Company in theaters in California.

He was signed into films in late 1912 and starred in 132 films between 1913 and 1932. He was closely associated with the films of Cecil B. DeMille with whom he frequently collaborated. He was known for his death scenes; playing characters who died violently in more than 100 films.

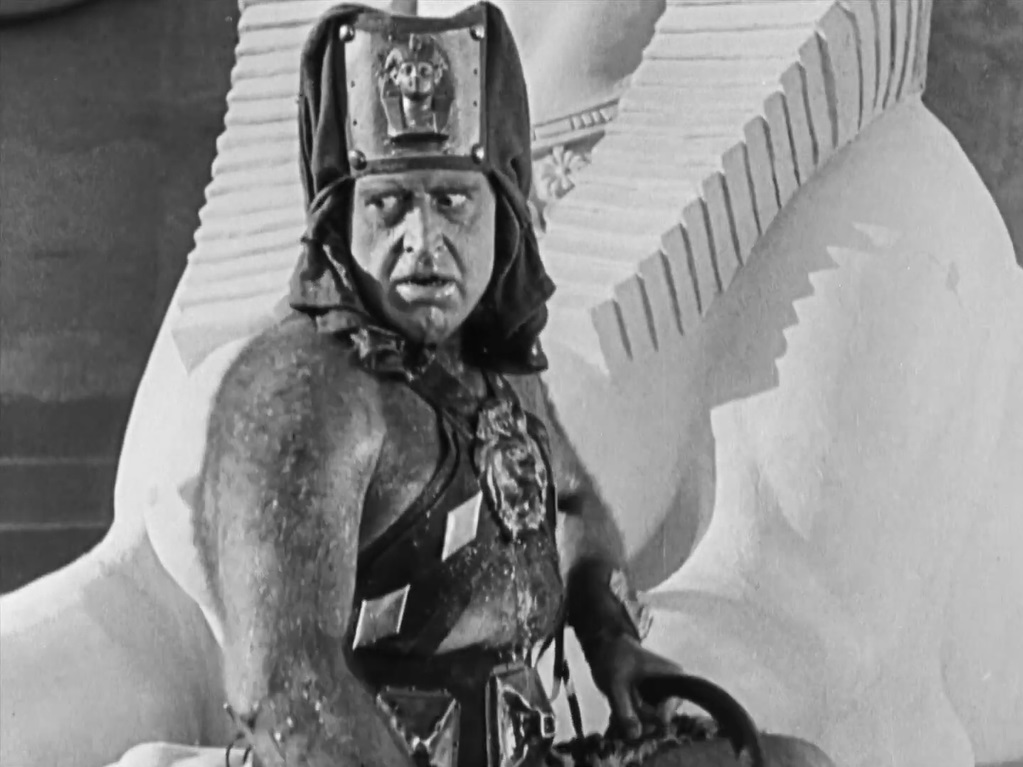
Burton as the Egyptian taskmaster in The Ten Commandments (1923)

By late 1920, Burton had become heavy enough to be considered unsuited for his typical villainous roles in films. A trainer supervised a program of exercise and diet until Burton had lost enough weight to be cast in the Paramount film The Jacklins.

Burton died of a heart attack on December 1, 1933 at the age of 51 at his home in Northeast Los Angeles, California.

== Partial filmography ==
Burton appeared in over 160 films during his career. The table below represents a partial list of his filmography.

Film performances
Year	Title	Role	Notes
1913	The Werewolf	Ezra Vance	
1916	The Sign of the Spade	Dave Harmon	
1916	The Twinkler	Boss Corregan	
1917	The Sea Master	Pedro	
1917	Beloved Rogues	Jack Kennedy	
1917	My Fighting Gentleman	Isiah Gore	
1918	Fame and Fortune	Sheriff of Palo	
1919	The Spender	Elmer Robbins	
1919	The Last of the Duanes	Bland	
1919	Wings of the Morning	Taung Si Ali	
1919	The Return of Mary	John Denby	
1919	Six Feet Four	Sheriff Cole Dalton	
1919	Castles in the Air	John McArthur	
1920	The Six Best Cellars	Henry Carpenter	
1920	Thou Art the Man	Matt Solomon	
1921	Forbidden Fruit	Steve Maddock	
1921	The Lost Romance	Detective	
1921	Crazy to Marry	Gregory Slade	
1921	Miss Lulu Bett	Ninian Deacon	
1921	Fool's Paradise	Manuel	
1922	Her Husband's Trademark	Mexican Bandit	
1922	The Impossible Mrs. Bellew	Detective	
1922	The Beautiful and Damned	Bloeckman	
1923	Adam's Rib	Cave man	
1923	Garrison's Finish	Crimmins	
1923	The Satin Girl	Moran	
1923	The Ten Commandments	Taskmaster	
1924	The Mine with the Iron Door	The Sheriff	
1924	No More Women	Beef Hogan	
1924	The Navigator	Spy	Uncredited
1925	The Road to Yesterday	Hugh Armstrong	
1925	The Coming of Amos	Pedro Valdez	
1925	The Wedding Song	Capt. Saltus	
1925	The Million Dollar Handicap	Langdon	
1925	Savages of the Sea	Black Brock	
1926	Shipwrecked	Red Gowland	
1926	The Danger Girl	Organ Man	
1926	The Warning Signal	N/A	
1926	The Nervous Wreck	Andy McNab	
1927	Rubber Tires	Mexican	
1927	The King of Kings	Penitent Thief	
1927	A Harp in Hock	Plainclothesman	
1927	Chicago	Police Sargeant	
1928	Stool Pigeon	Mike Shields	
1928	Stand and Deliver	Captain Melok	
1929	The Younger Generation	Police Desk Sargeant	Uncredited
1929	The Godless Girl	Prison Guard	
1929	Barnum Was Right	Martin	
1929	The Love Racket	Defense Attorney	
1930	The Unholy Three	Regan	
1930	The Love Trader	John	
1932	The Sign of the Cross	Servillius	

== Notes and references ==
=== Bibliography ===
- Lewisson, Louise Carley (2024). The Sheik and I - The Life and Career of Agnes Ayres. BearManor Media. ISBN 9798887714028.
- Truitt, Evelyn Mack (1984). Who Was Who On Screen. R. R. Bowker. ISBN 0835219062.
