= Extravagance (1921 film) =

1921 film directed by Phil Rosen

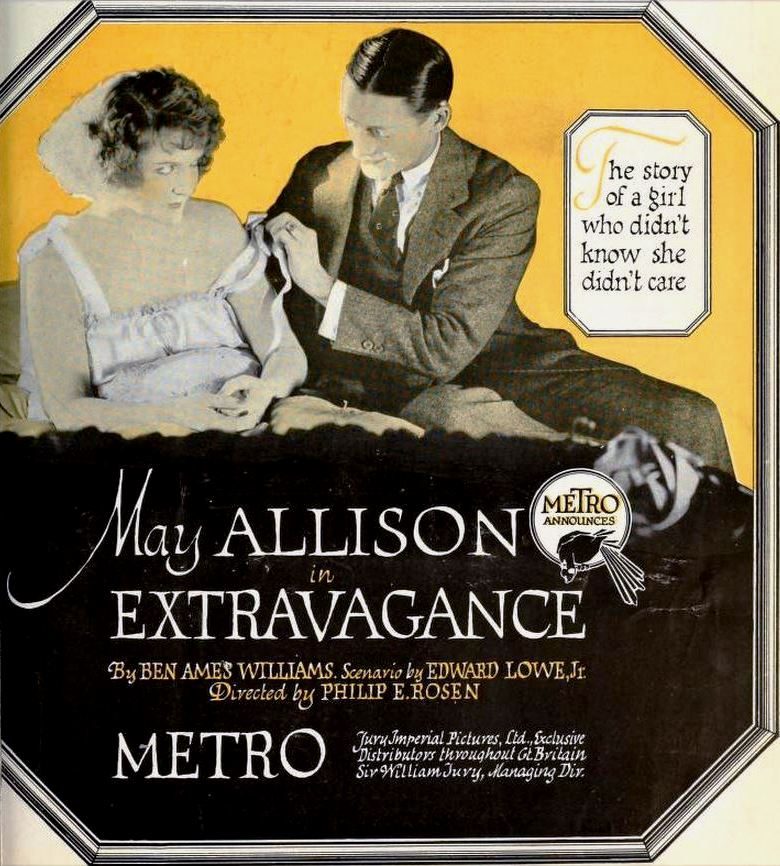
- Directed by: Phil Rosen
- Written by: Edward T. Lowe
- Based on: the short story, "More Stately Mansions" by Ben Ames Williams
- Starring: May Allison; Robert Edeson; Theodore Von Eltz
- Cinematography: Rudolph Bergquist
- Production company: Metro Pictures
- Release date: March 7, 1921 (US)
- Running time: 6 reels
- Country: United States
- Language: Silent (English intertitles)

Extravagance is a lost 1921 American silent melodrama film, directed by Phil Rosen. It stars May Allison, Robert Edeson, and Theodore Von Eltz, and was released on March 7, 1921.

== Plot ==
Richard Vane is a young lawyer who is married to Nancy Brown, who has expensive tastes and does not understand the meaning of the word, "no". She is continually getting them into more and bigger financial difficulties. This culminates in her demands for a large home, which Richard cannot afford, and he forges his father's signature, which is discovered, and brings shame on them. She realizes the error of her ways, and repents, promising to turn over a new leaf.

== Cast ==
- May Allison as Nancy Brown
- Robert Edeson as Richard Vane
- Theodore Von Eltz as Dick Vane
- William Courtwright as Pa Brown
- Grace Pike as Ma Brown
- Lawrence Grant as Uncle Mark

== Production ==
The original title of the film was Are Wives to Blame, it was changed to Extravagance in February 1921. In early October 1920, it was announced that Robert Edeson had been attached to the project with May Allison as the star, and Phil Rosen had been selected to direct the film. Filming on the movie began in late October 1920. Just prior to the start of production, Theodore Von Eltz was added to the cast. On a day off during filming, Allison was entertaining a group of neighborhood children at her Beverly Hills estate, when she suffered a fall playing tag, which resulted in her breaking several ribs.

== Reception ==
The Bangor Daily News enjoyed the picture, calling Allison's acting, "wonderful" and "superb". "More real than life itself" stated the paper, and "The picture's universal appeal, the theme which went home with such directness, captured attention as few others have done." They gave praise to the supporting cast and the "beautiful" cinematography of Rudolph Bergquist. They also complimented Phil Rosen's direction. The Asheville Citizen-Times gave the film a good review, "'Extravagance' is a picture vivid with universal interest and appeal." The felt the picture had "a scope far exceeding anything this star has essayed in the past." Exhibitors Herald gave the film a negative review, saying it was overlong, and could have been told in half the time. "The picture has been given a costly production, but nothing ever happens in the attractive sets." They felt the direction was mediocre, but felt that Allison and Edeson were bright spots. They especially complimented the photography of Bergquist.
