= Religion and Gun Practice =

1913 film

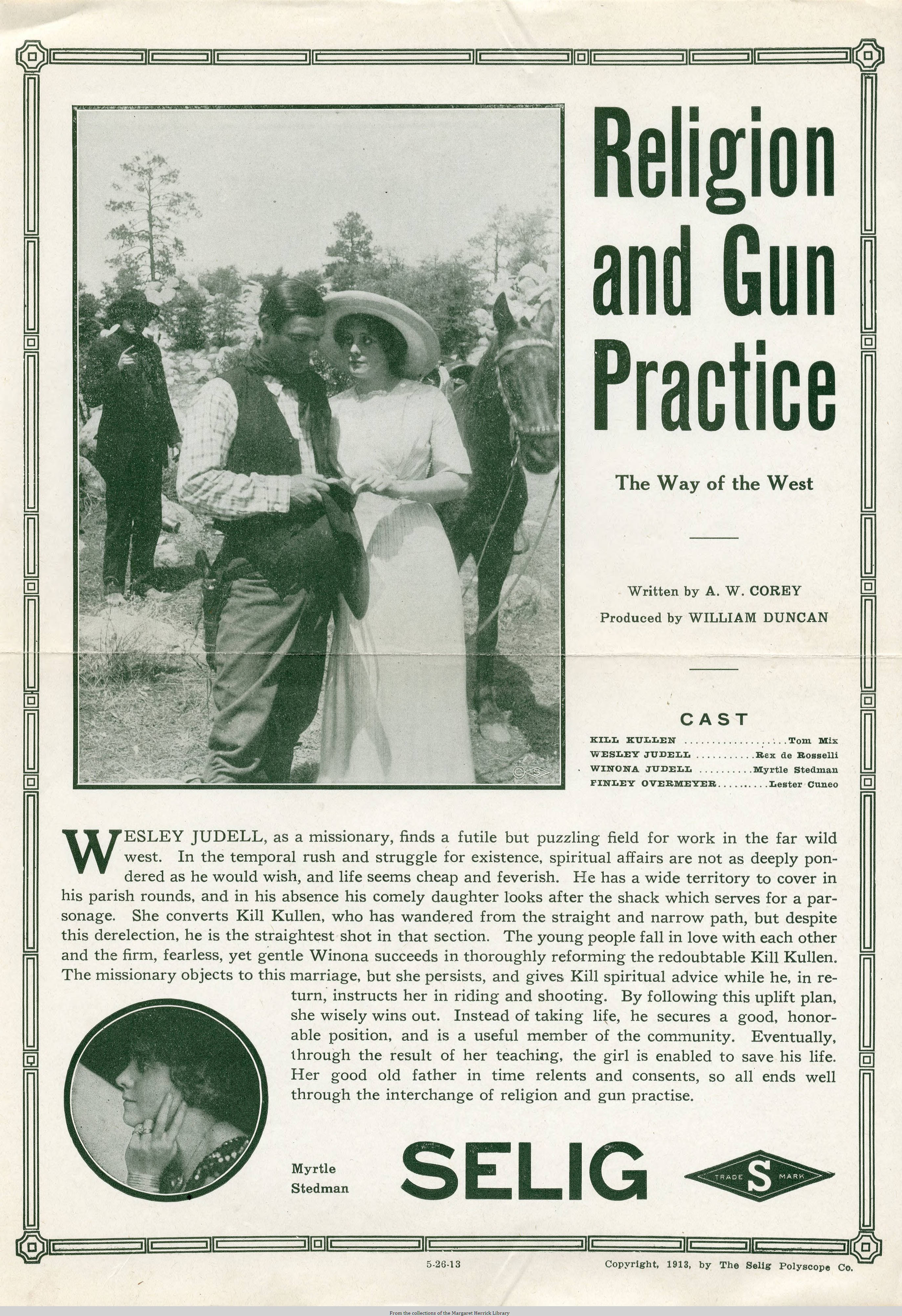
- Release flier for Religion and Gun Practice
- Directed by: William Duncan
- Written by: William A. Corey (story); William Duncan (scenario)
- Produced by: William Selig
- Starring: Tom Mix; Rex De Rosselli; Myrtle Stedman
- Production company: Selig Polyscope Company
- Distributed by: Selig Polyscope Company
- Release date: May 26, 1913
- Running time: 27 minutes, 46 seconds
- Country: United States
- Languages: Silent; English intertitles

Religion and Gun Practice: The Way of the West is a 1913 American silent Western film directed by William Duncan and starring Tom Mix, Rex De Rosselli and Myrtle Stedman. Among other roles in similar films at the time, Tom Mix's role in Religion and Gun Practice established what would be the cowboy hero of the twentieth century. The movie was played in theaters across the nation.

== Plot ==
Tom Mix plays "a western outlaw reformed by a missionary's daughter." Kill Kullen and the missionary's daughter, Winona Judell, fall in love. She sets him back on the path of righteousness, and though her father disapproves of their desire to marry each other, she is persistent. Kill Kullen teaches her how to ride and shoot, and her father eventually yields.

== Filming ==
The movie was filmed by William Duncan and the Selig Polyscope Company in the facilities of what used to be the Lubin Film Company studio, in Prescott, Arizona. The location provided a landscape of hills and valleys, forest, and desert wasteland ("Slaughter House Gulch"), as well as iconic rock formations.

== Cast ==
- Tom Mix as Kill Kullen
- Rex De Rosselli as Wesley Judell
- Myrtle Stedman as Winona Judell
- Lester Cuneo as Finley Overmeyer
- Old Blue as Kullen's Horse (uncredited)
