= The Secret Wire =

1916 film by Tom Ricketts

- Directed by: Thomas Ricketts
- Written by: Thomas Ricketts
- Starring: Harold Lockwood; May Allison
- Distributed by: Mutual Film
- Release date: January 14, 1916
- Country: United States
- Languages: Silent film English intertitles

The Secret Wire is a 1916 American silent short romantic drama written and directed by Thomas Ricketts. The film stars Harold Lockwood and May Allison and centers on a melodramatic rescue.

== Cast ==
- Harold Lockwood
- May Allison
- William Stowell
- Harry von Meter
