= The Testing of Mildred Vane =

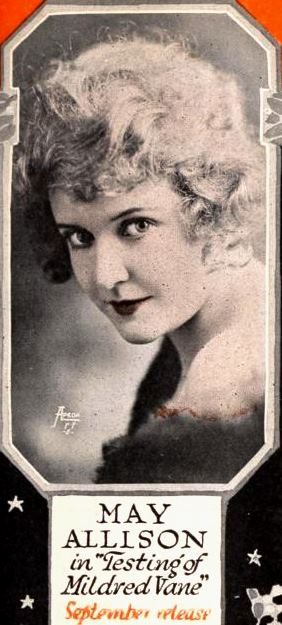
- trade advertisement
- Directed by: Wilfred Lucas
- Written by: George D. Baker(scenario); Charles T. Dazey(story)
- Starring: May Allison
- Cinematography: William Fildew
- Production company: Metro Pictures
- Distributed by: Metro Pictures
- Release date: December 2, 1919
- Running time: 5 reels
- Country: USA
- Language: Silent (English intertitles)

The Testing of Mildred Vane is a lost 1918 American silent film drama directed by Wilfred Lucas who was famous for being in front of the camera rather than behind it. It stars May Allison and was produced and distributed by Metro Pictures.

== Cast ==
- May Allison - Mildred Vane
- Darrell Foss - Albert Moreland
- George Field - Dr. Miguel Hernandez
- Nigel De Brulier - Matthew Vane
- Fred Goodwins - Ralph Jeffries

== Preservation ==
With no holdings located in archives, The Testing of Mildred Vane is considered a lost film.
