= Fred J. Balshofer =

American film producer (1877–1969)

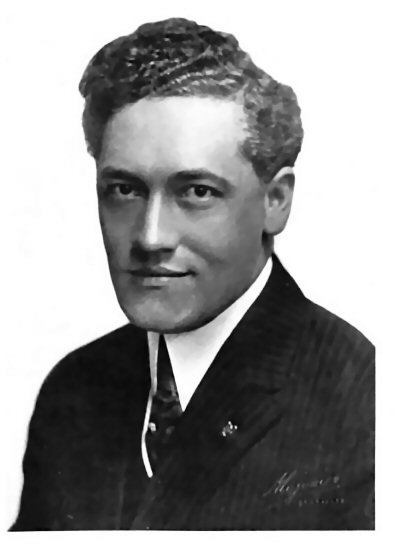
- Who's Who in the Film World, 1914
- Born: November 2, 1877; New York City, US
- Died: June 21, 1969 (aged 91); Calabasas, California, US
- Resting place: Hollywood Memorial Park Cemetery
- Occupation: Cinematographer

Fred J. Balshofer (November 2, 1877 – June 21, 1969) was a pioneering silent film director, producer, screenwriter, and cinematographer in the United States.

== Biography ==
Balshofer was born in New York City and became interested in the photography business at an early age. He eventually worked as a stereoscopic-slide photographer and was drawn to the fledgling motion picture business. From 1905 to 1908, he worked at Lubin Studios in Philadelphia. In 1909, because he owned a motion picture camera, he was hired by Adam Kessel of the New York Motion Picture Company and directed his first film, "Disinherited Son's Loyalty", on which he also served as cinematographer. That same year he directed Davy Crockett – In Hearts United, believed to be the first Davy Crockett movie ever made. Filming at the time centered mainly around facilities and locations in the Fort Lee, New Jersey area but within a few years Balshofer moved to the West Coast as General Manager of the New York Motion Picture Company, directing western films for their subsidiary, Bison Motion Pictures until Thomas H. Ince joined the studio.

In early 1914, Balshofer left NYMPC and became the head of the Sterling Motion Picture Company, a subsidiary of Universal Pictures. Sterling ceased production in early 1915 and a few months later Balshofer joined Quality Pictures, a subsidiary of Metro Pictures. By 1916, Balshofer was president and general manager of the Yorke-Metro studios at 1329 Gordon St. in Hollywood. In the 1920s, he produced and directed films for his own production company.

During his career, Fred Balshofer produced and/or directed more than eighty silent films then, after an unsuccessful attempt at age fifty directing a Spanish language talkie, he spent the better part of his remaining career working as a studio executive. In 1967, he teamed up with friend and acclaimed cinematographer Arthur C. Miller to write a significant book on the film industry under the title "One Reel a Week." Published by the University of California Press, the book chronicled the early history of the motion picture industry, including the shift in location and facilities from the East Coast to Southern California and the rise of the western film genre.

== Selected filmography ==
- Disinherited Son's Loyalty (1908), New York Motion Picture Company.
- Davy Crockett – In Hearts United (1908), New York Motion Picture Company. Cast includes: Charles K. French
- An Indian Love Story (1911), Bison. Cast includes: Mona Darkfeather and Dove Ey
- A Corner in Cotton (1916), Quality Pictures. Cast includes: Marguerite Snow and William Clifford
- The Masked Rider (1916), Yorke Film Corporation.
- Pidgin Island (1916), Yorke Film Corporation. Cast includes: Harold Lockwood and May Allison
- Paradise Garden (1917), Yorke Productions. Cast includes: Harold Lockwood and Vera Sisson
- The Avenging Trail (1917) Metro Pictures, Yorke Productions. Cast includes: Harold Lockwood and Sally Crute
- The Haunted Pajamas (1917) Metro Pictures, York Film Corporation
- Broadway Bill (1918), Yorke Film Corporation. Cast includes: Harold Lockwood and Martha Mansfield
- The Landloper (1918), Yorke Film Corporation. Cast includes: Harold Lockwood and Pauline Curley
- An Adventuress (1920). Cast includes: Julian Eltinge and Frederick Ko Vert
- The Isle of Love (1922), Yorke Films/A Herald Production. Cast includes: Julian Eltinge and Virginia Rappe
- The Three Buckaroos (1922)
