= Are All Men Alike? =

1920 film

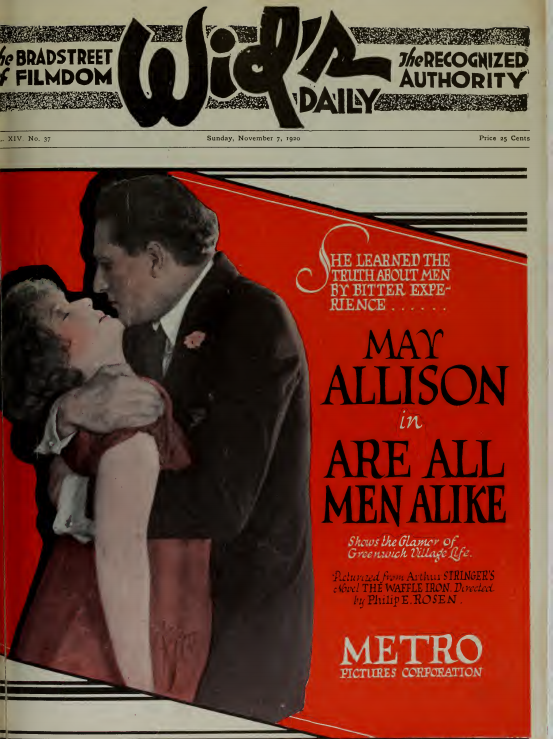
- Trade advertisement
- Directed by: Phil Rosen
- Written by: A. P. Younger
- Based on: the short story, "The Waffle Iron" by Arthur Stringer
- Starring: May Allison; Wallace MacDonald; John Elliott
- Cinematography: Ben Bail
- Edited by: Laurence T. Creutz
- Production companies: Metro Pictures; Screen Classics
- Distributed by: Metro Pictures
- Release date: November 8, 1920 (US)
- Running time: 6 reels
- Country: United States
- Language: Silent (English intertitles)

Are All Men Alike? is a lost 1920 American silent comedy-drama film directed by Phil Rosen. It stars May Allison, Wallace MacDonald, and John Elliott, and was released on November 8, 1920.

== Plot ==
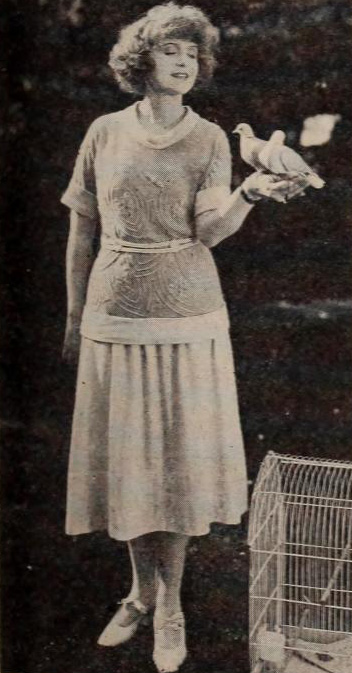
May Allison from the film

Theodora Hayden, who gave herself the nickname of Teddy as an adolescent, is a wealthy socialite, with an appetite for airplanes and fast cars. She is engaged to her childhood sweetheart, attorney Gerry Rhinelander West. Spoiled, she is used to following her desires, without a thought to the consequences. When Gerry takes her to a café in Greenwich Village, she decides she loves the freedom of the Bohemian lifestyle the Village affords. Spurning West, she rents a place in the Village, and begins to paint incredibly horrendous pictures. She has her sports car parked in front of her building. In her encounters, she meets Ruby Joyce, another free spirit, and Ruby's boyfriend, Gunboat Dorgan, a boxer. In their interaction, Dorgan mistakes Teddy's flirting with true attraction. Teddy is then introduced to another artist, Raoul Uhlan, who tries to seduce her. When she rebuffs him, he turns aggressive. She is only saved by the entrance of Dorgan, who physically assaults the artist, throwing him out. Feeling that she now owes him something, Dorgan takes her in his arms and kisses her. She pushes him away, after which he storms out and takes her sports car for a joy ride. On his ride, Dorgan strikes another vehicle, causing extensive damage.

Teddy receives notice of three lawsuits against her. Ruby is suing her for alienation of affection, due to Dorgan feeling there is something between Teddy and him. The owner of the car which Dorgan plowed into is suing her for damages to the vehicle. Finally, Uhlan is suing her for the assault on him by Dorgan. Teddy confidently turns to her family, expecting their financial backing to get her out of her triple dilemma. However, her family spurns her. Distraught, she does not know what she will do, until Gerry re-enters her life. He promises to fix everything if she will simply agree to whatever he wants as his fee. She does, after which he makes everything right, as well as once again winning her affection.

== Cast ==
- May Allison as Theodora Hayden
- Wallace MacDonald as Gerry Rhinelander West
- John Elliott as Uncle Chandler
- Winifred Greenwood as Mrs. Hayden
- Emanuel Turner as "Gunboat" Dorgan
- Ruth Stonehouse as Ruby Joyce
- Lester Cuneo as Raoul Uhlan
- Harry Lamont

== Production ==
In mid-June 1920 it was announced that Phil Rosen's contract was up with Universal, and that he had signed to direct a picture for Metro titled, "Are All Men Alike?", based on Arthur Stringer's short story "The Waffle Iron". On June 19 the following members of the cast were revealed: May Allison, Wallace MacDonald, Ruth Stonehouse, Winifred Greenwood, John Elliott, Emanuel Turner. The film had wrapped filming and was being edited by the end of August. On November 20, it was revealed that Lester Cuneo had joined the cast. The picture was released on November 8, 1920.

== Reception ==
Exhibitors Herald gave the film a generally positive review, enjoying Allison's performance, comparing her to Billie Burke, and also singling out the acting work of Ruth Stonehouse, William Green, and Lester Cuneo in supporting roles. They approved of the titles, lighting and cinematography. Overall they felt the film was pleasant, but slow-moving. Wid's Daily (one of the early titles to The Film Daily) gave the film a lukewarm review. They felt the direction and cinematography were good, while the lighting was simply adequate, they highlighted the Greenwich Village feel of the interior shots, as well as some of the exterior locations. They felt that Allison's portrayal was satisfactory, while the supporting cast was adequate. The main detractions were the overall length of the film, based on the slimness of the story, and felt the titles contained extraneous conversation.
