= Mister 44 =

1916 film directed by Henry Otto

- Directed by: Henry Otto
- Written by: Henry Otto (adaptation); Charles A. Taylor (scenario)
- Based on: Mister 44 by E.J. Rath
- Starring: Harold Lockwood; May Allison; Lester Cuneo; Yona Landowska; Henry Otto; Aileen Allen
- Cinematography: Tony Gaudio
- Production company: Yorke Film Corporation
- Distributed by: Metro Pictures
- Release date: September 11, 1916
- Running time: 50 minutes
- Country: United States
- Languages: Silent film (English intertitles)

Mister 44 is a 1916 American silent comedy-drama film directed by Henry Otto and starring Harold Lockwood, May Allison, Lester Cuneo, Yona Landowska, Henry Otto, and Aileen Allen. It is based on 1916 novel of the same name by E.J. Rath. The film was released by Metro Pictures on September 11, 1916.

== Cast ==
- Harold Lockwood as John Stoddard
- May Allison as Sadie Hicks
- Lester Cuneo as Eagle Eye
- Yona Landowska as Larry Livingston
- Henry Otto as Dick Westfall
- Aileen Allen as Mrs. Westfall
- Belle Hutchinson as Mrs. Stoddard
- Lee Arms as Ferguson
- Franklin Hall

== Preservation ==
A print is prepared and preserved by MGM.
