= Big Tremaine =

Film directed by Henry Otto

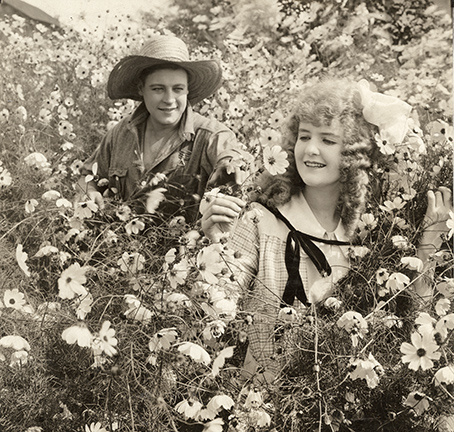
- Directed by: Henry Otto
- Written by: Henry Otto
- Based on: Big Tremaine by Marie Van Vorst
- Starring: Harold Lockwood; May Allison; Lester Cuneo; Albert Ellis; Lillian Hayward; William Ehfe
- Cinematography: Tony Gaudio
- Production company: Yorke Film Corporation
- Distributed by: Metro Pictures
- Release date: November 20, 1916
- Running time: 50 minutes
- Country: United States
- Languages: Silent film (English intertitles)

Big Tremaine is a 1916 American silent romantic drama film directed by Henry Otto and starring Harold Lockwood, May Allison, Lester Cuneo, Albert Ellis, Lillian Hayward, and William Ehfe. It is based on the 1914 novel of the same name by Marie Van Vorst. The film was released by Metro Pictures on November 20, 1916.

== Cast ==
- Harold Lockwood as John Tremaine, Jr.
- May Allison as Isobel Malvern
- Lester Cuneo as Redmond Malvern
- Albert Ellis as Judge Tremaine
- Lillian Hayward as Mrs. Tremaine
- William Ehfe as David Tremaine
- Andrew Arbuckle as Samuel Leavitt
- Josephine Rice as Mammy
- William De Vaull as John Nolan
- Virginia Southern as Julia Cameron

== Preservation ==
The film is now considered lost.

== See also ==
- List of lost films
