= The Man in the Sombrero =

1916 film by Tom Ricketts

- Directed by: Tom Ricketts
- Written by: Tom Ricketts
- Starring: Harold Lockwood; May Allison
- Distributed by: Mutual Film
- Release date: January 23, 1916
- Country: United States
- Languages: Silent film English intertitles

The Man in the Sombrero is a 1916 American silent short romantic drama written and directed by Tom Ricketts. The film features Harold Lockwood and May Allison.

== Cast ==
- Harold Lockwood
- May Allison
- William Stowell
- Harry von Meter
