= Davy Crockett – In Hearts United =

1909 film

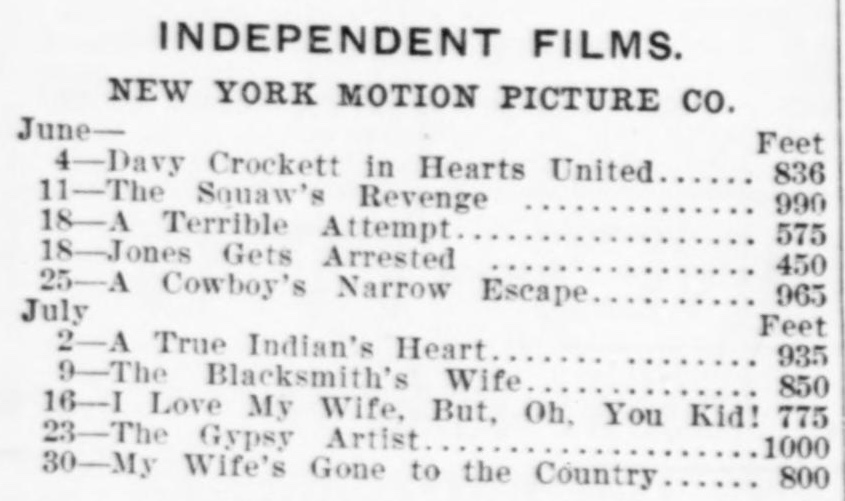
- Listing for several movies including Davy Crockett – In Hearts United in a contemporary magazine
- Directed by: Fred Balshofer
- Written by: Charles K. French
- Produced by: Bison Film Company
- Starring: Charles K. French
- Cinematography: Fred Balshofer
- Distributed by: New York Motion Picture Co.
- Release date: June 4, 1909
- Country: United States
- Languages: Silent; English intertitles

Davy Crockett – In Hearts United is a 1909 American silent Western film starring Charles K. French as Davy Crockett, with Evelyn Graham, Charles Bauman, Charles W. Travis and Charles Inslee. The film was directed by Fred Balshofer, produced by Bison Film Company, and distributed by New York Motion Picture Co. It was commercially released on June 4, 1909 in the United States. It is believed to be the first movie ever made about Davy Crockett.

== Plot ==
The fictional romance depicts frontiersman Crockett rescuing a woman named Anna in mid-ceremony from marriage to a man she doesn't love. She and Crockett ride off on his horse. They go directly to a minister who marries them, and he brings her home to his mother.
