= The Return of Mary =

1918 American silent film directed by Wilfred Lucas

- Directed by: Wilfred Lucas
- Written by: George D. Baker
- Based on: the play, The Return of Mary by Hale Hamilton
- Produced by: George D. Baker
- Starring: May Allison; Clarence Burton; Claire McDowell
- Cinematography: William E. Fildew
- Production company: Metro Pictures
- Release date: September 23, 1918 (US)
- Running time: 5 reels
- Country: United States
- Language: English

The Return of Mary is a 1918 American silent drama film, directed by Wilfred Lucas. It stars May Allison, Clarence Burton, and Claire McDowell, and was released on September 23, 1918.

== Cast list ==
- May Allison as Mary
- Clarence Burton as John Denby
- Claire McDowell as Mrs. John Denby, Sr.
- Darrell Foss as Jack Denby
- Frank Brownlee as John Graham
- Joseph Belmont as the butler, Clark

== Preservation ==
It is now a lost film.
