= The Great Romance (film) =

1919 film directed by Henry Otto

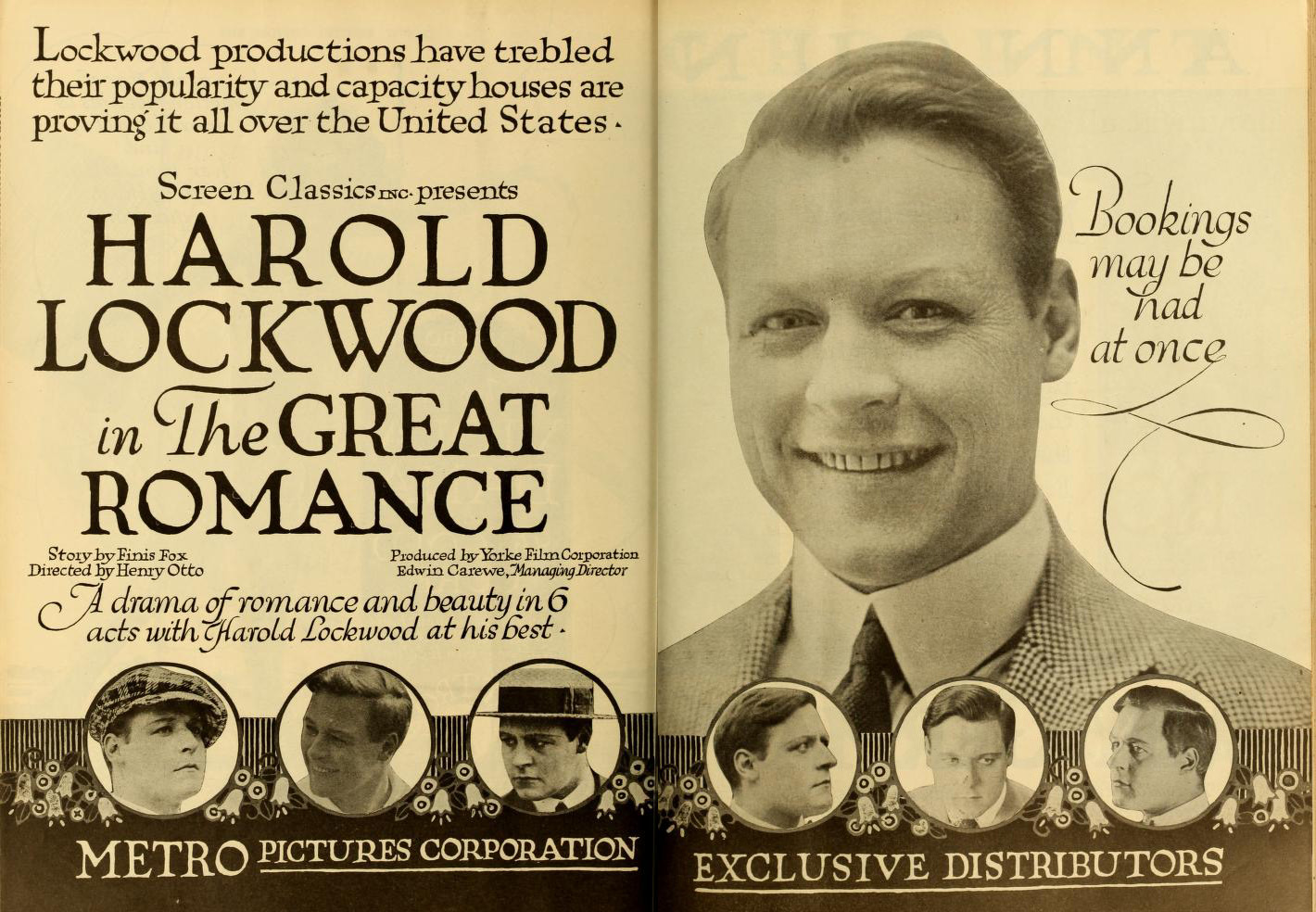
- Directed by: Henry Otto
- Written by: Finis Fox
- Starring: Harold Lockwood; Rubye De Remer; Frank Currier
- Cinematography: Rudolph J. Bergquist
- Production company: Yorke Film Corporation
- Distributed by: Metro Pictures
- Release date: January 19, 1919
- Running time: 60 minutes
- Country: United States
- Languages: Silent; English intertitles

The Great Romance is a 1919 American silent romance film directed by Henry Otto and starring Harold Lockwood, Rubye De Remer and Frank Currier.

== Main cast ==
- Harold Lockwood as Rupert Danza
- Rubye De Remer as Althea Hanway
- Joseph Granby as Prince Boris
- Frank Currier as King Rudolph
- Helen Lindroth as Olga Marie
- Franklyn Hanna as John P. Hanway
- Clare Grenville as Mrs. Hanway

== Bibliography ==
- Darby, William. Masters of Lens and Light: A Checklist of Major Cinematographers and Their Feature Films. Scarecrow Press, 1991.
