= Lawrence J. Quirk =

American journalist (1923–2014)

- Born: September 9, 1923; Lynn, Massachusetts
- Died: October 17, 2014 (aged 91); Manhattan, New York City
- Occupations: Author; reporter; editor
- Partner: William Schoell
- Writing career
- Genre: Biography

Lawrence J. Quirk (September 9, 1923 – October 17, 2014) was an American writer, Hollywood reporter and film historian.

== Career ==
Lawrence J. Quirk was born in 1923 at Lynn, Massachusetts.

He was the nephew of James R. Quirk, former editor and publisher of the now-defunct Photoplay magazine. He was an army sergeant in Korea, a reporter for the Hearst papers, and a film magazine editor and publisher. Quirk was a film critic, writer, and editor for many publications. Beginning in the 1960s, he wrote more than 30 books primarily on movie stars in Hollywood.

He used his knowledge and friendship with Hollywood actors and politicians such as the Kennedys to gain material for his books. Quirk also appeared on many radio and television programs, including Good Morning America, Good Morning, New York, and A Current Affair. He was profiled by Patricia Bosworth for the April 1998 Hollywood issue of Vanity Fair.

He lived in Manhattan until his death in October 2014 at the age of 91.

== Works ==
=== Books ===
- The Complete Films of William Powell (1986)
- Fasten Your Seat Belts: The Passionate Life of Bette Davis (1990)
- Bob Hope: The Road Well-Traveled (1999)
- Joan Crawford: The Essential Biography (University Press of Kentucky, 2002) with William Schoell
- Rat Pack, The Neon Nights with the Kings of Cool (2003) with William Schoell
- The Kennedys in Hollywood (1996)
- Robert Francis Kennedy: The Man and the Politician (1968)
- The Films of Joan Crawford (1968)
- The Films of Ingrid Bergman (1970)
- The Films of Fredric March (1971)
- The Great Romantic Films (1974)
- The Films of Robert Taylor (1975)
- The Films of Ronald Colman (1977)
- The Films of Warren Beatty (1979)
- The Films of Myrna Loy (1980)
- The Films of Gloria Swanson (1984)
- Claudette Colbert: An Illustrated Biography (Crown; 1985)
- Jane Wyman: The Actress and the Woman: An Illustrated Biography (Crown, 1986)
- Lauren Bacall: Her Films and Career (1986)
- Norma: The Story of Norma Shearer (St. Martin's; 1988)
- Margaret Sullavan: Child of Fate (St. Martin's)
- The Films of Katharine Hepburn, by Homer Dickens, revised and updated by Lawrence J. Quirk (1990)
- The Life and Wild Times of Cher (1992)
- Great War Films: From the Birth of a Nation to Today (1994)
- James Stewart: Behind the Scenes of a Wonderful Life (1997)
- Robert Redford: The Sundance Kid (Taylor Trade Publishing, ) with William Schoell
- Paul Newman: A Life, Updated Edition (Taylor Trade Publishing, 2009)

=== Reviews ===
- "Lulu in Hollywood: A Disgraceful Pot-Pouri of Blatant Falsehoods, Distortions and Odd Biographical Omissions: Self-Pitying, Self-Congratulatory - and Self-Serving " (June 1982)
- "Brilliant Pittsburgh Journalist Barry Paris Coming Out with a Major Biography of Louise Brooks" (August 1986)
