= The Gamble (1916 film) =

1916 short film by Tom Ricketts

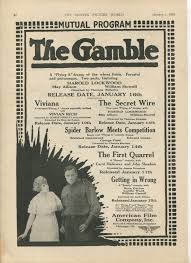
- Directed by: Thomas Ricketts
- Written by: Thomas Ricketts
- Distributed by: Mutual Film
- Release date: January 16, 1916
- Running time: 2 reels
- Country: United States
- Languages: Silent film English intertitles

The Gamble is a 1916 American silent short drama film written and directed by Thomas Ricketts. Set on a farm, the film stars Harold Lockwood and May Allison.

== Cast ==
- Harold Lockwood
- May Allison
- William Stowell
- Harry von Meter
