= The Buzzard's Shadow =

1915 film by Tom Ricketts

The Buzzard's Shadow (aka:The Shadow of Fear)
- Directed by: Thomas Ricketts
- Written by: Kenneth B.Clark
- Starring: Harold Lockwood; May Allison
- Production company: American Film Company
- Distributed by: Mutual Film
- Release date: December 9, 1915
- Running time: 5 reels
- Country: United States
- Languages: Silent film English intertitles

The Buzzard's Shadow is a 1915 American silent military drama film directed by Thomas Ricketts starring Harold Lockwood and May Allison. U.S. troops appear in the film, which was shot in San Diego at the San Diego Military Reservation.

The film was produced by the American Film Company and released as a Mutual Film Masterpiece. In 1918 the film was re-edited and re-released by the Arrow Film Corporation under the title, The Shadow of Fear.

== Plot ==
At an isolated army outpost in the desert, Alice Corbett (May Allison), a widow, supports herself and her daughter Barbara by doing laundry and cooking for the garrison. Sergeant Barnes (Harold Lockwood) falls in love with her. The post doctor, Deschamps (William Stowell), is having an affair with Mrs. Sears (Betty Harte), the colonel's wife. Barnes finds out and threatens to expose Deschamps unless he resigns.

Barnes also gets into a fight with Unitah (Harry von Meter), a half-breed, after catching him mistreating a horse. Both men now want revenge. The opportunity comes when Colonel Sears (Dick La Reno) orders Barnes to carry a message to another post. Deschamps poisons the sugar cubes Barnes brought for his horse. Unitah follows him and empties his canteen while he sleeps, filling it with sand.

When Barnes wakes, his horse is dead. He sets out on foot and only then realizes he has no water. Lost in the desert without hope, he sees buzzards circling above him. The heat and thirst nearly kill him. He wanders delirious until he falls onto a railroad track, where a train crew finds him.

Barnes loses his memory. It returns when he sees an American flag. He telegraphs the fort immediately. Deschamps and Unitah attempt to escape but Barnes tracks them down. Soldiers shoot Unitah; Deschamps is arrested. Barnes is decorated for his actions and marries Alice.

== Cast ==
The cast of The Buzzard's Shadow is documented by the American Film Institute.

- Harold Lockwood as Sergeant Barnes
- May Allison as Alice Corbett
- William Stowell as Dr. Deschamps
- Harry von Meter as Unitah, the half-breed
- Alice Ann Rooney as Areep, the squaw
- Dick La Reno as Colonel Sears
- Betty Hart as Mrs. Sears
- Virginia Fordyce as Barbara Corbett
