= The Masked Rider (1916 film) =

1916 film by Fred J. Balshofer

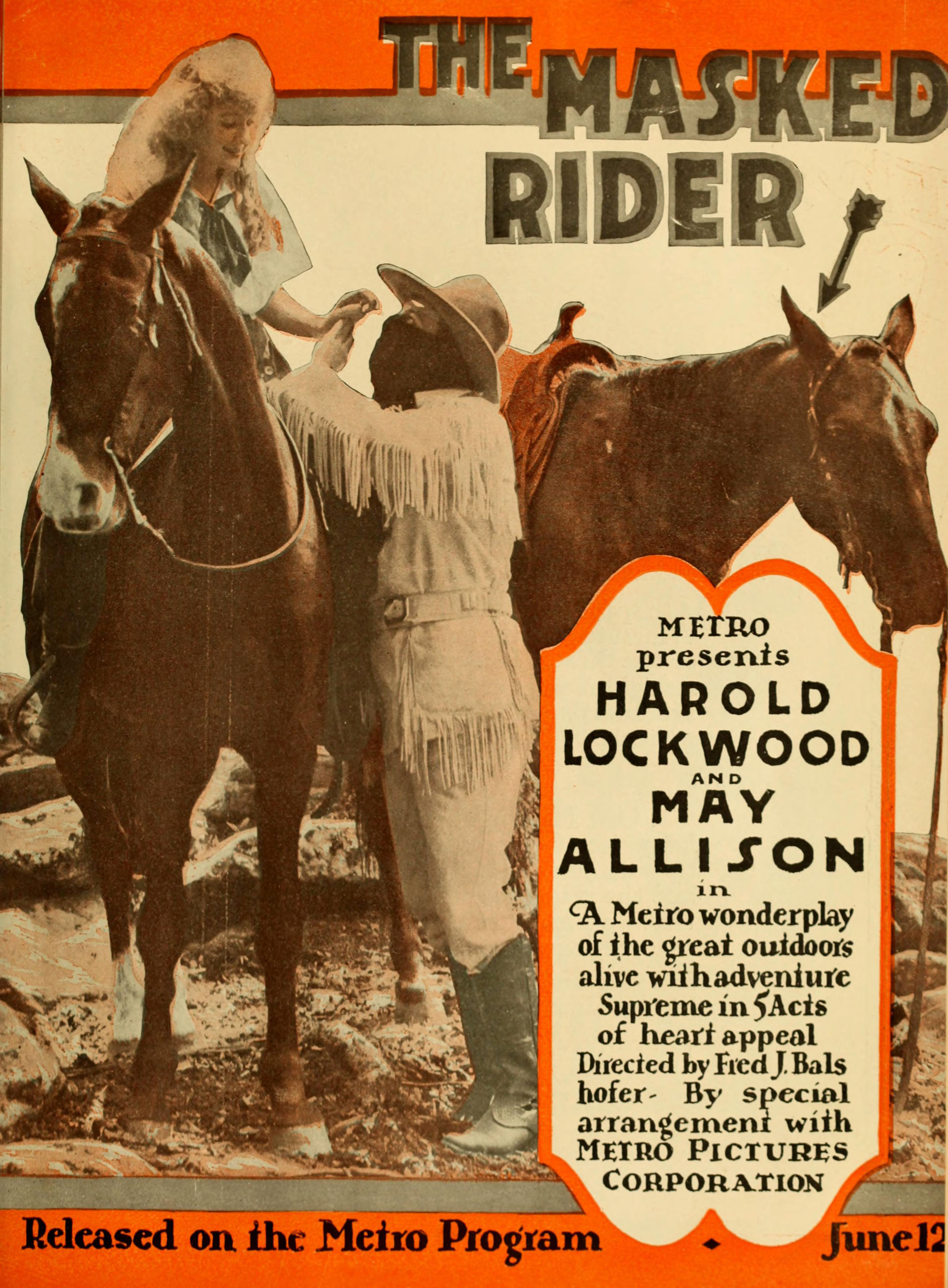
- Directed by: Fred J. Balshofer
- Written by: Fred J. Balshofer
- Produced by: Quality Pictures Corporation; Fred J. Balshofer
- Starring: Harold Lockwood; May Allison
- Cinematography: Harold Linkey
- Distributed by: Metro Pictures
- Release date: June 12, 1916
- Running time: 5 reels
- Country: USA
- Language: Silent..English titles

The Masked Rider is a 1916 silent film drama directed by Fred J. Balshofer and starring Harold Lockwood and May Allison. It was distributed by Metro Pictures.

== Cast ==
- May Allison - Jill Jamison
- Lester Cuneo - Squid Archer
- Harold Lockwood - Bruce Edmunds
- Clarissa Selwynne - Mrs. Hart
- Howard Truesdell - Jimmy Jamison
- H. W. Willis - Grant Carr
- Jack McDonald - Tom Monjar
- Harry Burkhardt - Patrick Hart
- Harry Linkey - George Edmunds

== Preservation status ==
- The film exists with prints at the George Eastman House, Library of Congress and New Zealand Film Archive.
