= Lillie Hayward =

American screenwriter

- Born: Lillian Olenda Auen; September 12, 1891; St. Paul, Minnesota, U.S.
- Died: June 29, 1977 (aged 85); Hollywood, California, U.S.
- Resting place: Hollywood Forever Cemetery
- Occupation: Screenwriter
- Years active: 1911–1964
- Spouses: Duke Hayward (died 1918); Jerry Sackheim (m. 1960)
- Relatives: Seena Owen (sister)

Lillie Hayward (born Lillian Olenda Auen, September 12, 1891 – June 29, 1977) was an American screenwriter whose Hollywood career began during the silent era and continued well into the age of television.

She wrote for more than 70 films and TV shows including the Disney film The Shaggy Dog and television series The Mickey Mouse Club and Walt Disney's Wonderful World of Color. She was also remembered for the films Her Husband's Secretary and Aloma of the South Seas, the latter written in part with the help of her sister, actress and screenwriter Seena Owen.

Lillie Hayward died in 1977 and was interred at Hollywood Forever Cemetery in Los Angeles. Her husband of seventeen years, Jerry Sackheim, was also a Hollywood writer with whom she had worked on The Boy and the Pirates (1960).

== Partial filmography ==
- Pidgin Island (1916, actor)
- Big Tremaine (1916, actor)
- Unto Those Who Sin (1916, actor)
- The Promise (1917)
- Wild Winship's Widow (1917)
- Janice Meredith (1924)
- The Fighting Heart (1925)
- Runaway Girls (1928)
- Miss Pinkerton (1932)
- They Call It Sin (1932)
- Frisco Jenny (1932) (story)
- Lady Killer (1933)
- Bedside (1934)
- Registered Nurse (1934)
- Housewife (1934)
- Big Hearted Herbert (1934)
- Front Page Woman (1935)
- Her Husband's Secretary (1937)
- Penrod and Sam (1937)
- The Biscuit Eater (1940)
- Aloma of the South Seas (1941)
- The Undying Monster (1942)
- My Friend Flicka (1943)
- Tahiti Nights (1944)
- Black Beauty (1946)
- Blood on the Moon (1948)
- Follow Me Quietly (1949)
- Strange Bargain (1949)
- Cattle Drive (1951)
- The Raiders (1952)
- The Proud Rebel (1958)
- Tonka (1958)
- The Shaggy Dog (1959)
- The Boy and the Pirates (1960)
- Lad: A Dog (1962)
