= Lester Cuneo =

American actor

Lester H. Cuneo
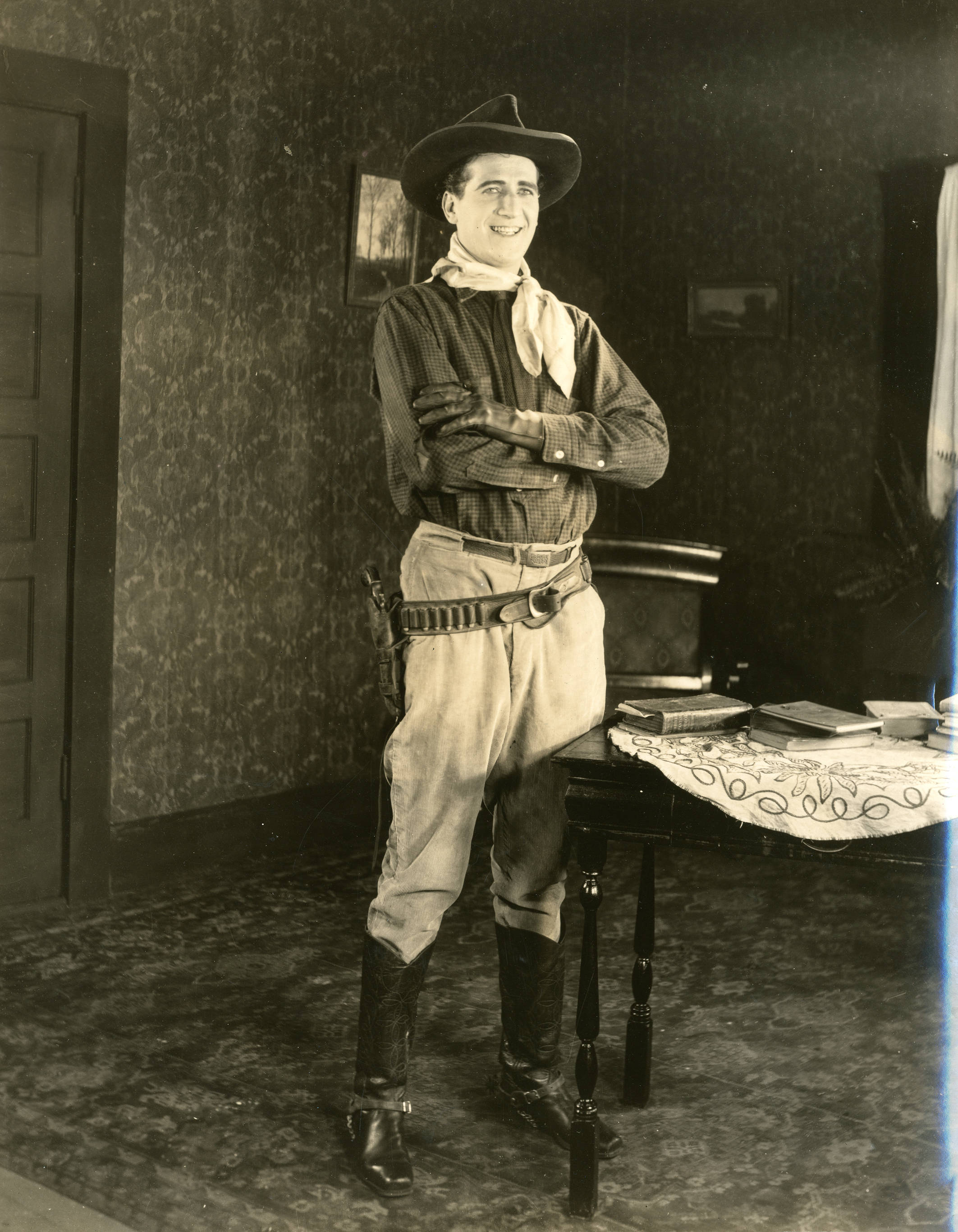
- Cuneo in The Masked Avenger (1922)
- Born: Lester H. Cuneo; October 25, 1888; Chicago, Illinois, U.S.
- Died: November 1, 1925 (aged 37); Los Angeles, California, U.S.
- Occupation: Actor
- Years active: 1912–1925
- Spouse: Francelia Billington (m.1920–div.1925)
- Children: 2

Lester H. Cuneo (October 25, 1888 – November 1, 1925) was an American stage and silent film actor. He began acting in theatre while still in his teens. His name remains associated with the history of Western film.

== Early years ==
Born in Chicago, Illinois, Cuneo attended Culver Military Academy, and he was a law student at Northwestern University when he turned to acting.

== Career ==

Cuneo's stage career included work with stock theater companies in Brooklyn, Chicago, and Winnipeg.

Cuneo began a film career in 1912 with the Chicago-based Selig Polyscope Company then joined Essanay Studios in 1914. Working in early Hollywood, his popularity increased after he switched from comedic roles to the increasingly popular western film genre. However, his career was interrupted when he served with the United States Army during World War I. He served in France from 1917 to 1919 with the 33rd Division from Illinois.

At war's end, Lester Cuneo returned to film, and in the early 1920s, he started his own production company, making primarily western films. Lester Cuneo Productions.

== Personal life ==
He married actress Francelia Billington in 1920, and they had two children. The two made 14 films together before their divorce in October 1925.

== Death ==
Despondent over the breakdown of his marriage and the downhill slide of his film career, Lester Cuneo took his own life with a gunshot to the head in 1925. He was interred in the Forest Lawn Memorial Park Cemetery in Glendale, California. His year of death is printed on his gravemarker as 1926 which contradicts 1925, the year usually given.

== Filmography ==
- Sons of the North Woods (1912)
- According to Law (1912)
- The Double Cross (1912)
- The Peculiar Nature of the White Man's Burden (1912)
- An Unexpected Fortune (1912)
- The Boob (1912)
- A Cowboy's Mother (1912)
- The Whiskey Runners (1912)
- An Equine Hero (1912) – Pete (half-breed)
- Circumstantial Evidence (1912) – Hort Ingles
- The Fighting Instinct (1912)
- The Brand Blotter (1912)
- The Cattle Rustlers (1912)
- Why Jim Reformed (1912)
- A Motorcycle Adventure (1912)
- The Opium Smugglers (1912)
- So-Jun-Wah and the Tribal Law (1912)
- Jim's Vindication (1912)
- The Dynamiters (1912) – Joe Thompson
- Between Love and the Law (1912)
- Roped In (1912) – The Cowboy
- The Ranger and His Horse (1912) – Pete Rogers
- Buck's Romance (1912) – Squaw's Father
- A Rough Rider With Nitroglycerine (1912)
- The Gunfighter's Son (1913)
- The Cowboy Editor (1913)
- Bud's Heiress (1913)
- A Canine Matchmaker; or, Leave It to a Dog (1913)
- How It Happened (1913)
- Bill's Birthday Present (1913)
- The Range Law (1913)
- The Bank's Messenger (1913)
- The Deputy's Sweetheart (1913)
- Juggling With Fate (1913) – Wallace
- The Sheriff of Yavapai County (1913) – The Frisco Kid (Apache Frank's partner)
- The Life Timer (1913) – Tom
- The Mail Order Suit (1913) – Steve
- His Father's Deputy (1913) – Sam Marvin (a crook)
- Religion and Gun Practice (1913) – Finely Overmeyer
- The Law and the Outlaw (1913) – Monty Ray
- An Embarrassed Bridegroom (1913)
- The Jealousy of Miguel and Isabella (1913)
- The Only Chance (1913) – Train Dispatcher
- Taming a Tenderfoot (1913) – Willie B. Clever (the tenderfoot)
- The Marshal's Capture (1913) – The marshal's wife's brother
- Sallie's Sure Shot (1913) – Coyote Jim
- Made A Coward (1913) – Tom Jones
- The Señorita's Repentance (1913)
- The Stolen Moccasins (1913) – Harden
- The Galloping Romeo (1913)
- How Betty Made Good (1913) – Jim
- The Rejected Lover's Luck (1913) Ben
- The Capture of Bad Brown (1913)
- The Cattle Thief's Escape (1913) – Charley Pointer
- The Silver Grindstone (1913) – Harry Custer
- Dishwash Dick's Counterfeit (1913) – Dick Mason
- Two Sacks of Potatoes (1913)
- The Schoolmarm's Shooting Match (1913) – Brown
- The Sheriff and the Rustler (1913) – The Sheriff
- The Child of the Prairies (1913) – Ed Dillon
- The Escape of Jim Dolan (1913) – Ed Jones
- Cupid in the Cow Camp (1913) – Arizona Bob
- The Rustler's Reformation (1913)
- Physical Culture on the Quarter Circle V Bar (1913) – Pete
- Buster's Little Game (1913) – Robins
- Mother Love Vs Gold (1913) – Jim Sykes
- By Unseen Hand (1914) – Warrington
- A Friend In Need (1914) – Girl's Father
- The Little Sister (1914) – First Badman
- A Mix-Up on the Plains (1914)
- A Romance of the Forest Reserve (1914)
- Marrying Gretchen (1914)
- Marian, the Holy Terror (1914)
- Algie's Sister (1914)
- Under Royal Patronage (1914) – Baron Spitzhausen
- The Plum Tree (1914) – Norris Griggs
- A Splendid Dishonor (1914) – Dr. Appledance
- The Moving Picture Cowboy (1914) – Director
- The Fable of the Author and the Dear Public and the Plate of Mush (1914)
- The Other Man (1914)
- In the Glare of the Lights (1914) – Joe Brandigan
- The Private Officer (1914) – Capt. Osborne
- His Dearest Foes (1914)
- The Prince Party (1914) – James Atteridge
- The Place, the Time and the Man (1914)
- Every Inch A King (1914) – King Livian
- The Loose Change of Chance (1914)
- The Way of the Woman (1914)
- The Shanty at Trembling Hill (1914)
- The Gallantry of Jimmy Rodgers (1915) – Ralph Morrison
- The Lieutenant Governor (1915) – Dennis McGrath
- The Ambition of the Baron (1915)
- Thirteen Down (1915) – Baron Schoman
- The Accounting (1915) – Sargall
- The Amateur Prodigal (1915)
- The Surprise of My Life (1915)
- The Strength of the Weak (1915)
- The Other Woman's Picture (1915)
- A Night In Kentucky (1915)
- Graustark (1915) – Prince Gabriel
- The Mystery of the Silent Death (1915)
- The Conspiracy at the Chateau (1915)
- On the Dawn Road (1915) – Granger
- The Slim Princess (1915) – The Only Koldo
- The Second in Command (1915) – Lt. Sir Walter Mannering
- The Silent Voice (1915) – Bobbie Delorme
- Pennington's Choice (1915) – Jean
- A Corner in Cotton (1916) – Willis Jackson
- The Come-Back (1916) – Mac Heberton
- The Masked Rider (1916) – Squid Archer
- The River of Romance (1916) – Reginald Williams
- A Virginia Romance (1916)
- Mister 44 (1916) – Eagle Eye
- Big Tremaine (1916) – Redmond Malvern
- Pidgin Island (1916) – Donald Smead
- The Promise (1917) – Buck Moncrossen
- The Hidden Children (1917) – Lt. Boyd
- The Haunted Pajamas (1917) – Judge Billings
- The Hidden Spring (1917) – Bill Wheeler
- Under Handicap (1917) – Brayley
- Paradise Garden (1917) – Jack Ballard
- Desert Love (1920) – The Whelp
- The Terror (1920) – 'Con' Norton
- Food For Scandal (1920) – Jack Horner
- Lone Hand Wilson (1920) – Lone Hand Wilson
- Are All Men Alike? (1920) – Raoul Uhlan
- The Ranger and the Law (1921) – Dick Dawson
- Blue Blazes (1922) – Jerry Connors
- The Masked Avenger (1922) – Austin Patterson
- Silver Spurs (1922) - Craig Hamilton
- Trapped in the Air (1922)
- In the Days of Buffalo Bill (1922)
- Blazing Arrows (1922) – Sky Fire
- The Devil's Ghost (1922)
- The Vengeance of Pierre (1923)
- The Zero Hour (1923)
- The Eagle's Feather (1923) – Jeff Carey
- Fighting Jim Grant (1923) – Jim Grant
- Western Grit (1924) – Walt Powers
- Ridin' Fool (1924)
- The Lone Hand Texan (1924)
- Hearts of the West (1925)
- Two Fisted Thompson (1925)
- Western Promise (1925)
- Range Vultures (1925)
