= The Broken Cross (1916 film) =

1916 short film by Tom Ricketts

- Directed by: Thomas Ricketts
- Written by: Tom Ricketts
- Starring: Harold Lockwood; May Allison
- Distributed by: Mutual Film
- Release date: February 1, 1916
- Country: United States
- Languages: Silent film English intertitles

The Broken Cross is a 1916 American silent short romantic film directed by Thomas Ricketts starring Harold Lockwood and May Allison.

== Cast ==
- Harold Lockwood
- May Allison
- Queenie Rosson
- Harry von Meter
