= May Allison =

American actress (1890–1989)

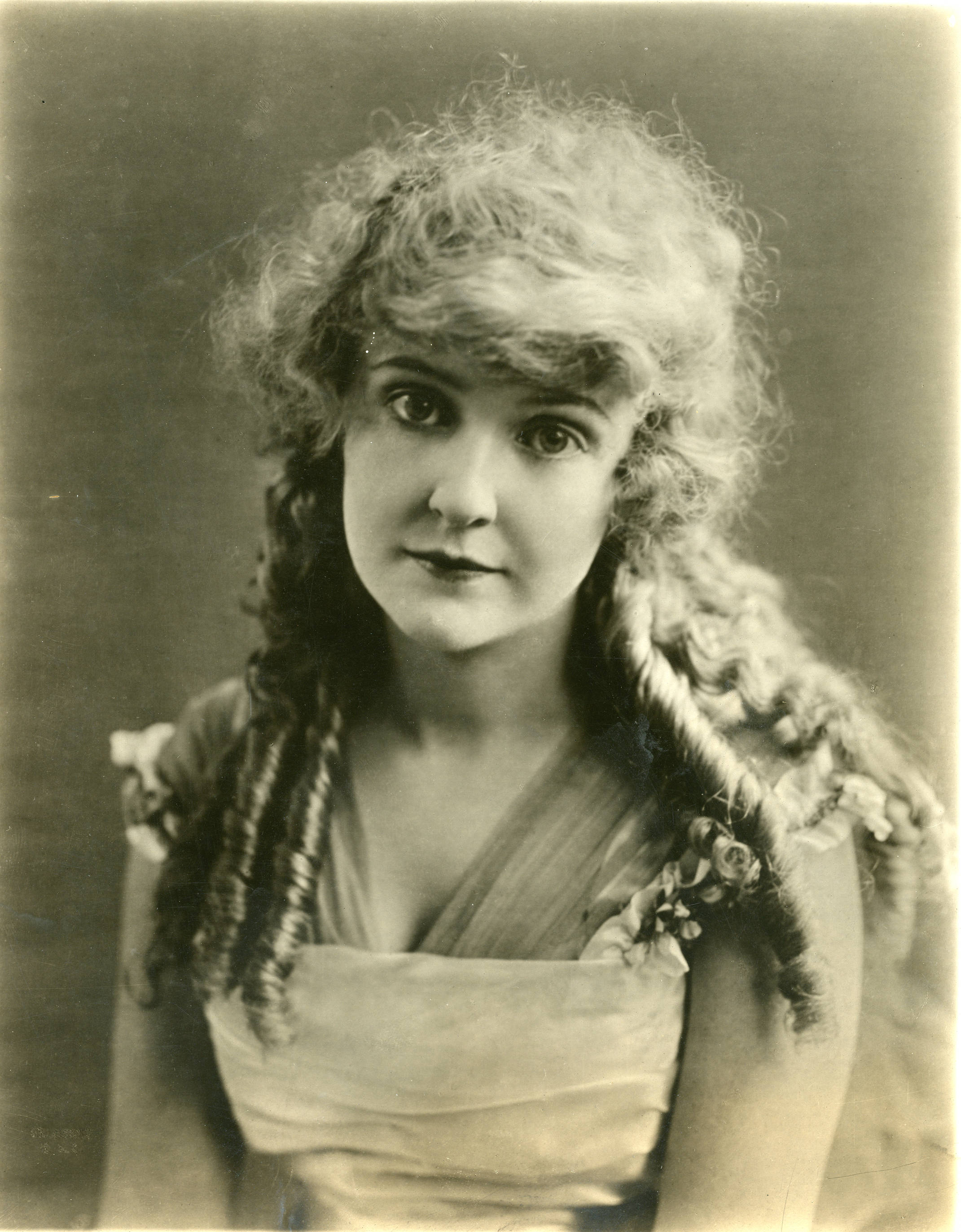
- Allison in 1925
- Born: June 14, 1890; Rising Fawn, Georgia, U.S.
- Died: March 27, 1989 (aged 98); Bratenahl, Ohio, U.S.
- Occupation: Actress
- Years active: 1911–1927
- Spouses: Colonel J.L. Stephenson (m. 1919; ann. 1920) Robert Ellis (m. 1920; div. 1923) James R. Quirk (m. 1926; died 1932) Carl Norton Osborne (m. 1934; died 1982)

May Allison (June 14, 1890 – March 27, 1989) was an American actress whose greatest success was achieved in the early part of the 20th century in silent films, although she also appeared on stage.

== Life and career ==
Allison was born in Rising Fawn, Georgia, the youngest of five children born to John Samuel Allison and Nannie Virginia (née Wise) Allison. She made her Broadway debut in 1911 as "Beauty" in Walter Browne's Everywoman before settling in Hollywood, California in the early days of motion pictures. Allison's screen debut was as an ingenue in the 1915 star-making Theda Bara vehicle A Fool There Was.

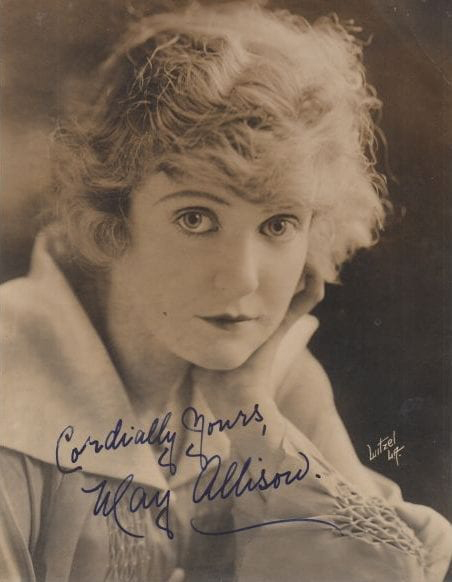

When Allison was cast that same year opposite actor Harold Lockwood in the Allan Dwan directed romantic film David Harum, audiences quickly became enamored of the onscreen duo. The pair starred in approximately twenty-five highly successful features together during the World War I era and became one of the first celebrated on-screen romantic duos.

Allison and Lockwood's highly popular film romances ended, however, when in 1918 Lockwood died at the age of 31 after contracting Spanish influenza, a deadly epidemic that swept the world from 1918 through 1920, killing 50 to 100 million people globally. Allison's career then faltered markedly without her popular leading male co-star. She continued to act in films throughout the 1920s, although she never received the same amount of public acclaim as when she starred opposite Harold Lockwood. Her last film before retiring was 1927's The Telephone Girl, opposite Madge Bellamy and Warner Baxter.

Allison was secretly married to Col. William Stephenson in Santa Ana, California, in December 1919, but the marriage was annulled in February 1920. On Thanksgiving day in 1920, Allison married writer and actor Robert Ellis. Allison filed for divorce from Ellis in December 1923, citing cruelty as the reason. Her filing explained the couple had married on November 25, 1920 in Greenwich, Connecticut and were separated about November 5, 1923. On November 15, 1926, witnessed by Ivan and Adela Rogers St. Johns, she married Photoplay magazine editor James R. Quirk, a union that lasted until his death in 1932.

Allison's last marriage, to Cleveland industrialist Carl Norton Osborne, took place on March 2, 1934 and lasted until his death in 1982. In her later years, Allison spent much of her time at her vacation home in Tucker's Town, Bermuda, and was a patron of the Cleveland Orchestra.

== Death ==
Allison died of respiratory failure in Bratenahl, Ohio, in 1989 at the age of 98, survived by a stepdaughter and four stepgrandchildren. She was buried at the Gates Mills South Cemetery in Gates Mills, Ohio.

== Selected filmography ==
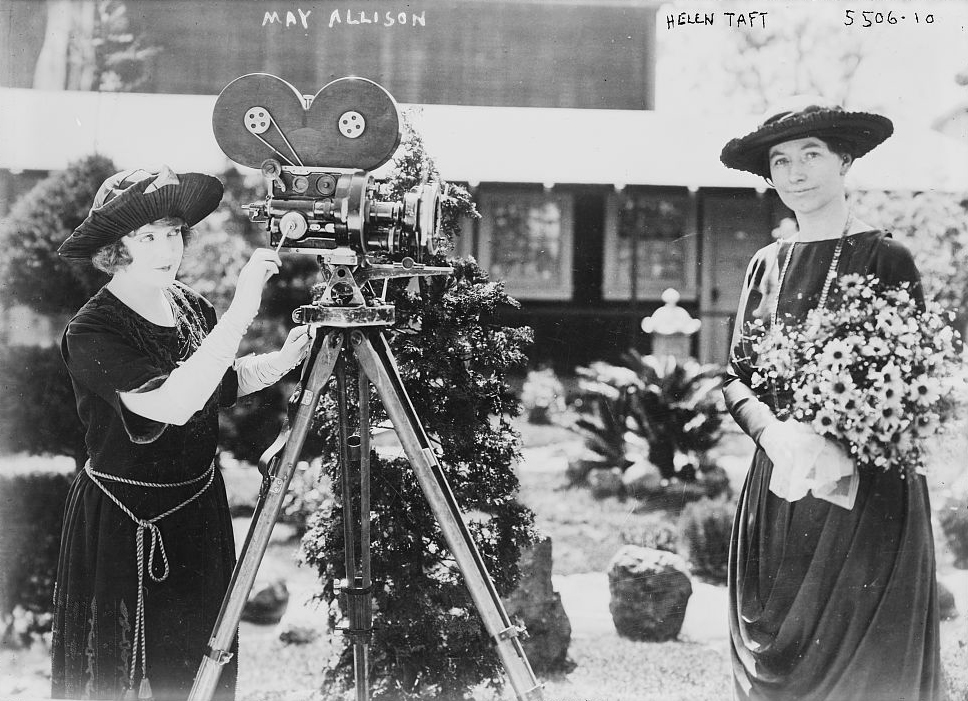
Allison (left) with Helen Taft Manning in 1921

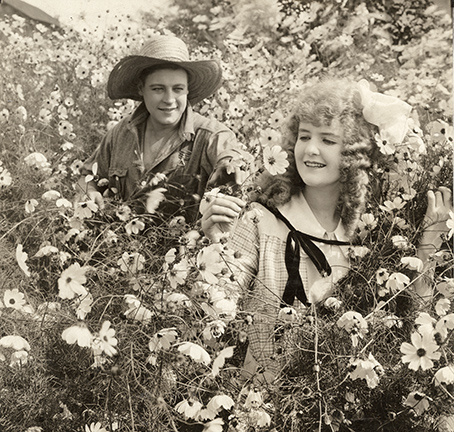
Still of Harold Lockwood and Allison in the 1916 silent drama Big Tremaine.

- A Fool There Was (1915) − The Wife's Sister
- David Harum (1915) − Mary Blake
- The Governor's Lady (1915) − Katherine Strickland
- The Secretary of Frivolous Affairs (1915) − Loulie
- The Great Question (1915, Short) − Flora Donner
- The House of a Thousand Scandals (1915) − Martha Hobbs
- The End of the Road (1915) − Grace Wilson
- The Buzzard's Shadow (1915) − Alice Corbett
- The Other Side of the Door (1916) − Ellie Fenwick
- The Secret Wire (1916, Short) − Vera Strong
- The Gamble (1916, Short) − Jean Hastings
- The Man in the Sombrero (1916, Short) − Alice Van Zandt
- The Broken Cross (1916, Short) − Helen Brandon
- Lillo of the Sulu Seas (1916, Short) − Lillo
- Life's Blind Alley (1916) − Helen Keating
- The Come−Back (1916) − Patta Heberton
- The Masked Rider (1916) − Jill Jamison
- The River of Romance (1916) − Rosalind Chalmers
- Mister 44 (1916) − Sadie Hicks
- Big Tremaine (1916) − Isobel Malvern
- Pidgin Island (1916) − Diana Wynne
- The Promise (1917) − Ethel Manton
- The Hidden Children (1917) − Lois de Contrecoeur
- Social Hypocrites (1918) − Leonore Fielding
- The Winning of Beatrice (1918) − Beatrice Buckley
- A Successful Adventure (1918) − Virginia Houston
- The Return of Mary (1918) − Mary
- The Testing of Mildred Vane (1918) − Mildred Vane
- Her Inspiration (1918) − Kate Kendall
- In for Thirty Days (1919) − Helen Corning
- Peggy Does Her Darndest (1919) − Peggy Ensloe
- The Island of Intrigue (1919) − Maida Waring
- Castles in the Air (1919) − Fortuna Donnelly
- Almost Married (1919) − Adrienne Le Blanc
- The Uplifters (1919) − Hortense Troutt
- Fair and Warmer (1919) − Blanny Wheeler
- The Walk−Offs (1920) − Kathleen Rutherford
- The Cheater (1920) − Lilly Meany, aka Vashti Dethic
- Held In Trust (1920) − Mary Manchester
- Are All Men Alike? (1920) − Teddy Hayden
- The Marriage of William Ashe (1921) − Lady Kitty Bristol
- Extravagance (1921) − Nancy Vane
- The Last Card (1921) − Elsie Kirkwood
- Big Game (1921) − Eleanor Winthrop
- The Woman Who Fooled Herself (1922) − Eva Lee
- The Broad Road (1923) − Mary Ellen Haley
- Flapper Wives (1924) − Claudia Bigelow
- Youth for Sale (1924) − Molly Malloy
- I Want My Man (1925) − Lael
- Wreckage (1925) − Rene
- The Greater Glory (1926) − Corinne
- Men of Steel (1926) − Clare Pitt
- Mismates (1926) − Belle
- The City (1926) − Elinor Voorhees
- One Increasing Purpose (1927) − Linda Travers Paris
- Her Indiscretion (1927)
- The Telephone Girl (1927) − Grace Robinson (final film role)
