= Harold Lockwood =

American actor

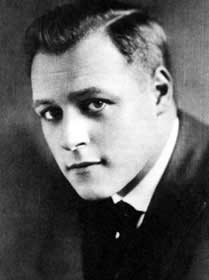
- Lockwood in 1916
- Born: April 12, 1887; Brooklyn, New York, U.S.
- Died: October 19, 1918 (aged 31); New York City, U.S.
- Resting place: Woodlawn Cemetery, The Bronx
- Occupations: Actor; director; producer
- Years active: 1911–1918
- Spouse: Alma Jones (m. 1906)
- Children: 1

Harold A. Lockwood (April 12, 1887 – October 19, 1918) was an American silent film actor, director, and producer. He was one of the most popular matinée idols of the early film period during the 1910s.

== Early life and career ==
Born in Brooklyn, Lockwood was raised and educated in Newark, New Jersey. Upon graduating, he began working in exporting. Lockwood quickly discovered that he did not enjoy exporting and quit to become an actor. He initially began his acting career in vaudeville.

In 1908, Lockwood joined the Selig Company. In 1910, Lockwood signed on with a stock company for David Horsley and appeared in Western shorts. He later worked for the New York Motion Picture Company, Selig Polyscope Company and Famous Players Film Company.

While at Famous Players, Lockwood was cast opposite actress May Allison in Allan Dwan's 1915 romantic film David Harum. The two would appear in over twenty-three films together during the World War I era, and became one of the first celebrated on-screen romantic duos. However, the two were never romantically involved off-screen.

== Personal life ==
On January 8, 1906, Lockwood married Alma Jones. The couple had a son, Harold Lockwood Jr., who later appeared in silent and sound films. Among his earliest credits is the 1928 World War I film Lilac Time, starring Colleen Moore and Gary Cooper.

== Death ==
On October 19, 1918, Lockwood died at the age of 31 of Spanish influenza at the Hotel Woodward in New York City. He had contracted the illness during production of Shadows of Suspicion (1919), which had some scenes completed using a double shot from behind. Lockwood's funeral was held on October 22 at Frank E. Campbell Funeral Chapel, after which he was buried in the Woodlawn Cemetery in the Bronx.

== Selected filmography ==
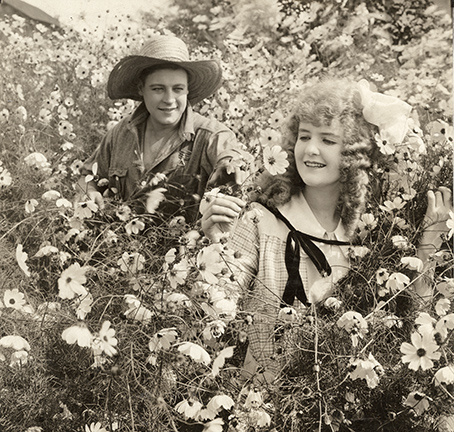
Harold Lockwood and May Allison in a scene still for the 1916 silent drama Big Tremaine

- The Best Man Wins (1911)
- Harbor Island (1912)
- Hearts Adrift (1914)
- Tess of the Storm Country (1914)
- The Scales of Justice (1914)
- The Unwelcome Mrs. Hatch (1914)
- Such a Little Queen (1914)
- Wildflower (1914)
- The Man from Mexico (1914)
- The Crucible (1914)
- David Harum (1915)
- The Great Question (1915)
- The Buzzard's Shadow (1915)
- Are You a Mason? (1915)
- Jim the Penman (1915)
- Pidgin Island (1916)
- Big Tremaine (1916)
- Mister 44 (1916)
- Intolerance (1916)
- The Gamble (1916)
- The Man in the Sombrero (1916)
- The Other Side of the Door (1916)
- The Broken Cross (1916)
- Lillo of the Sulu Seas (1916)
- The Secret Wire (1916)
- The Masked Rider (1916)
- Paradise Garden (1917)
- The Hidden Children (1917)
- The Haunted Pajamas (1917)
- The Promise (1917)
- The Square Deceiver (1917)
- The Hidden Spring (1917)
- The Avenging Trail (1917)
- Broadway Bill (1918)
- The Landloper (1918)
- Pals First (1918)
- The Great Romance (1919)
- Shadows of Suspicion (1919)

== Photo gallery ==
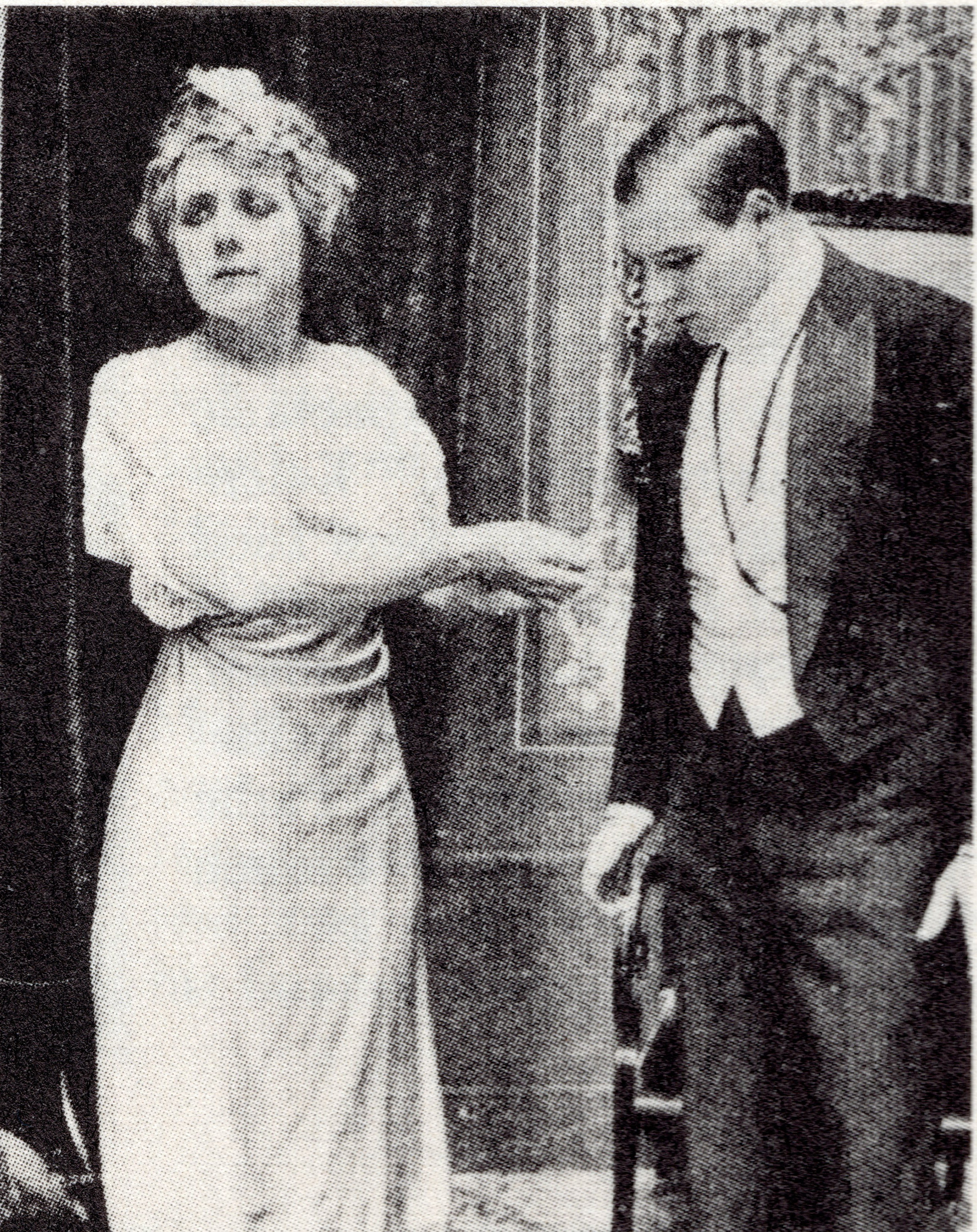
Kathlyn Williams and Harold Lockwood in Harbor Island (1912)

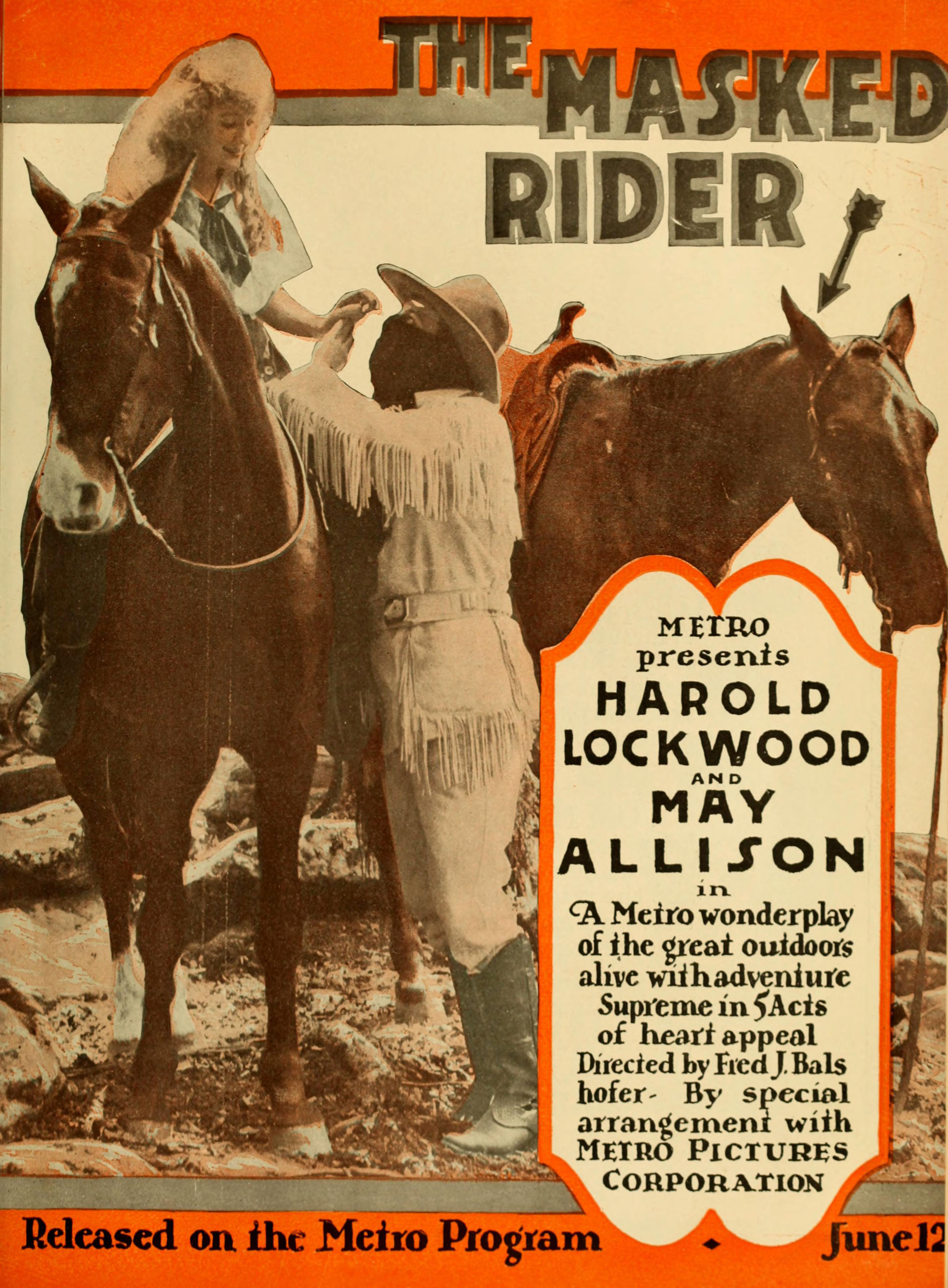
The Masked Rider (1916)

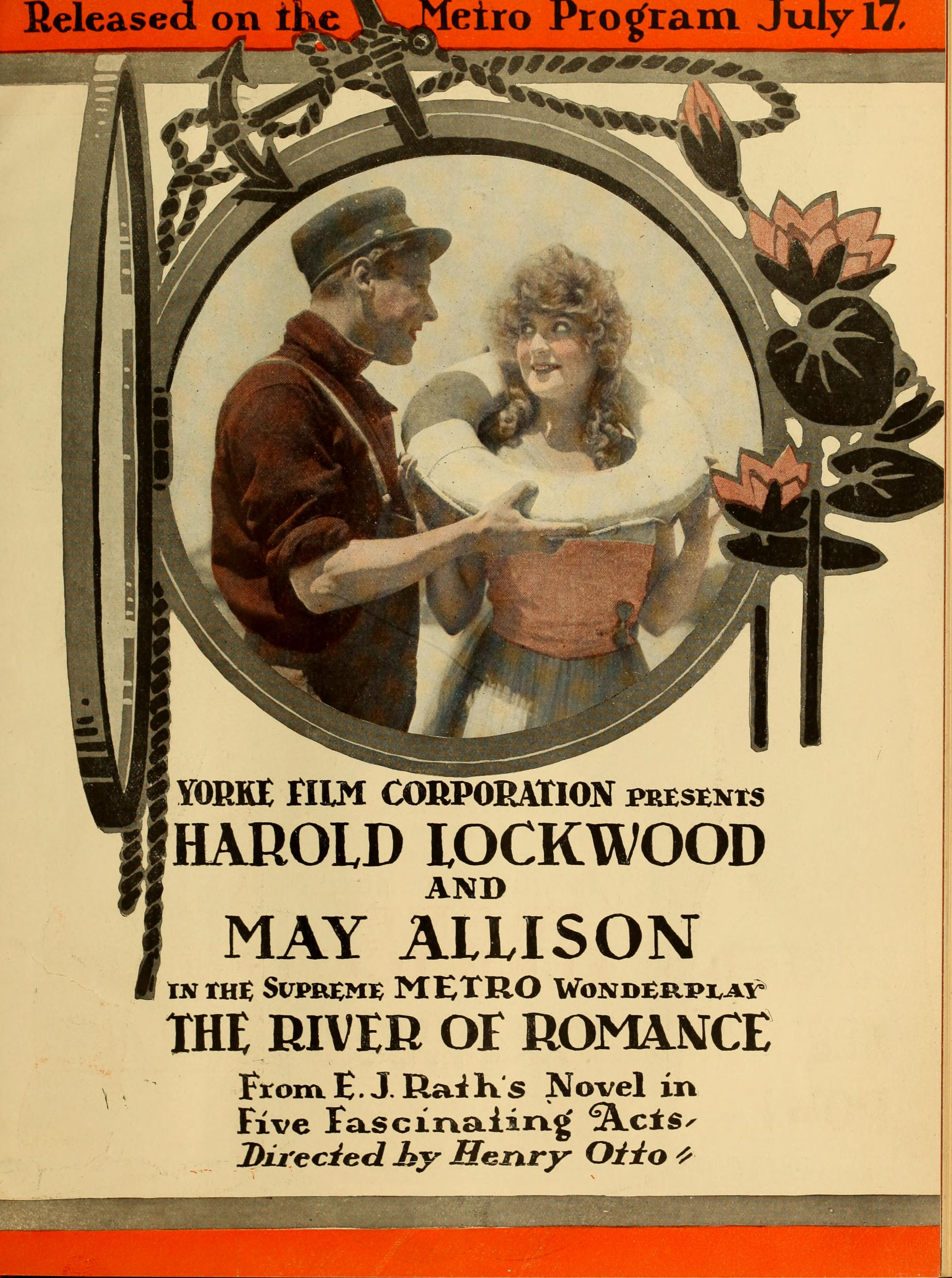
The River of Romance (1916)

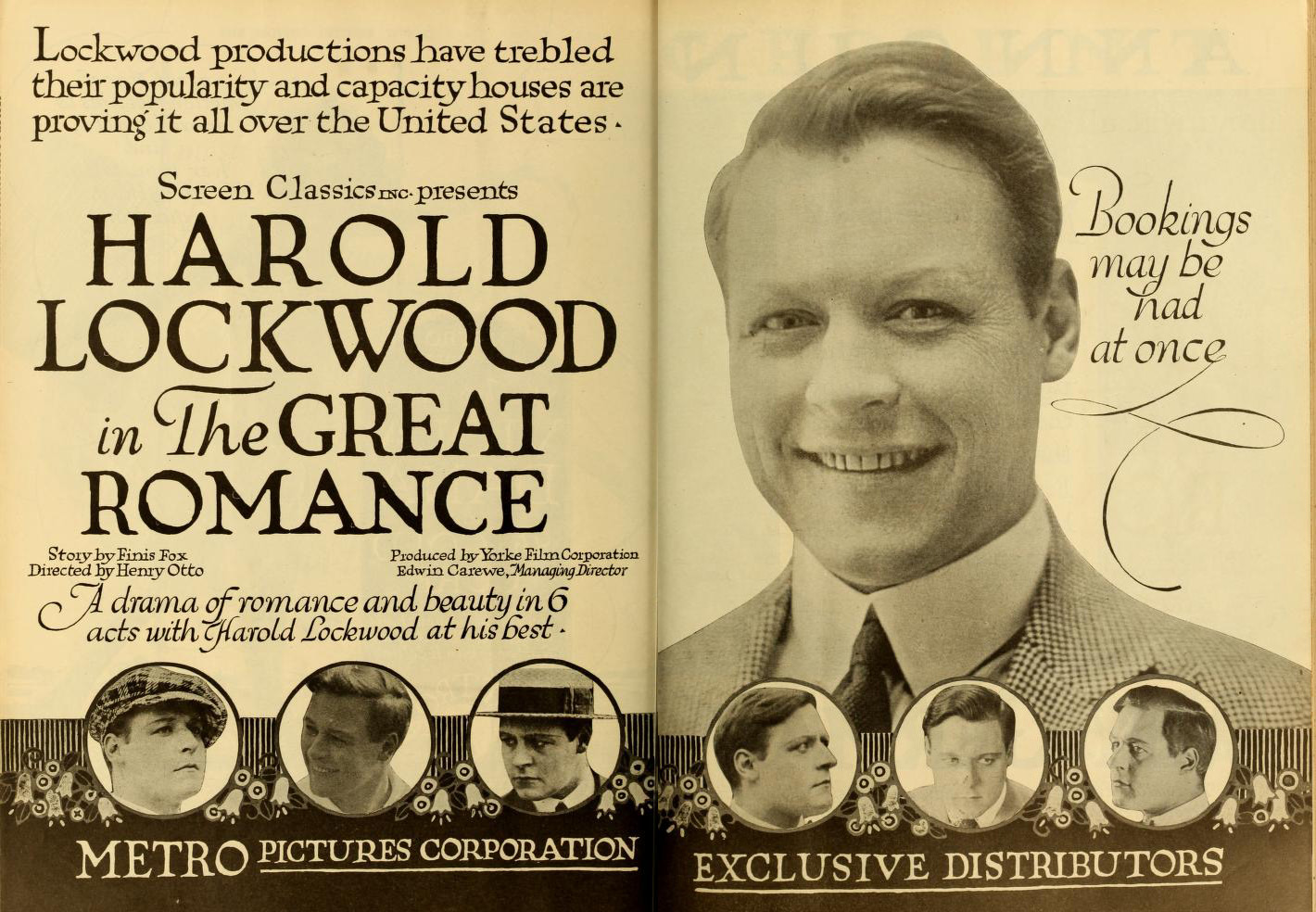
The Great Romance (1919)

With Addie Townsend (1918)
