= Paradise Garden =

Paradise Garden may refer to:

- Paradise Garden (novel)
- Paradise Garden (film)
- Paradise garden, a style of Persian garden.
