= The Song of the Soul =

The Song of the Soul may refer to:

- The Song of the Soul (1920 film), a silent film drama directed by John W. Noble
- The Song of the Soul (1918 film), a silent film directed by Tom Terriss
