= Elinor Hancock =

American actress

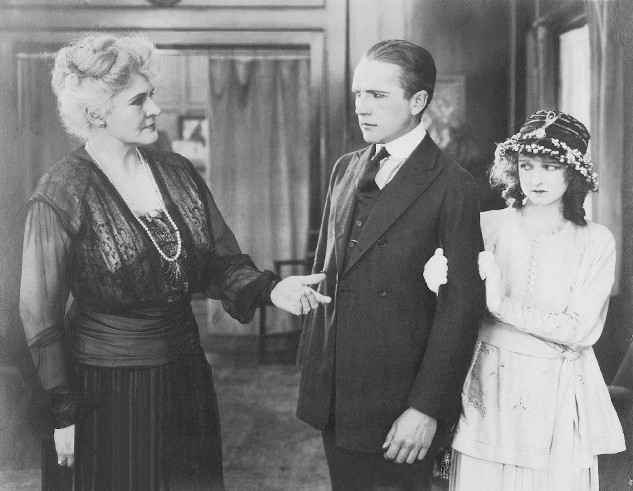
Still of Hancock (left) from A Kiss for Susie

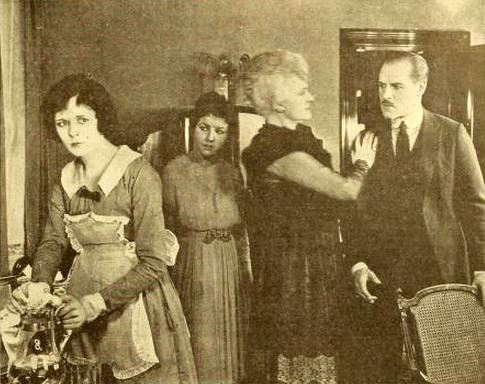
Hancock (third from left) in A Midnight Romance (1919)

Elinor Hancock, sometimes spelled as Eleanor Hancock, (fl. 1917 – c. 1923) was an American silent film actress active from 1917 through 1923. She mainly played supporting character roles. While she worked for many different studios in Hollywood, she was most active with Paramount Pictures (1917-1920) and Universal Studios (1920-1923).

== Career ==
According to silent film historian Eugene Michael Vazzana, there is no known information about Elinor Hancock's birth or death or background prior to working as a silent film actress. One of her first films was the Triangle Film Corporation movie Master of His Home in which she played the role of Mrs. Drake. In her early career she appeared in several supporting roles for films released by Paramount Pictures; including parts in The Spirit of Romance (1917, Mrs. Rollins), A Kiss for Susie (1917, Mrs. Burnham), The Fair Barbarian (1917, Lady Barold), A Desert Wooing (1918, as Mrs. Bereton), A Petticoat Pilot (1918), Love Me (1918, as Mrs. Appleby), Mirandy Smiles (1918, as Mrs. White), Little Comrade (1919, as Mrs. Hale), and The Rookie's Return (1920, as Mrs. Radcliffe).

Hancock worked for a variety of studios in 1919; appearing as The Dowager Lady St. Aubrey in The Splendid Sin for the Fox Film Corporation; Mrs. Palmer in Cheating Cheaters for Select Pictures; and as the mother of Jack Holt's character, Roger, in A Midnight Romance for First National Pictures. She also appeared in an uncredited role in The Better Wife (1919) with Clara Kimball Young. In 1920 she worked for Monroe Salisbury's film company as Mrs. Heatherton in the movie The Barbarian, and made two films with Goldwyn Pictures: Out of the Storm (as Mrs. Cutting) and The Cup of Fury (as Mrs. Prothero).

Hancock made several pictures with Universal Studios. Her first film for this organization was A Tokio Siren (1920) in which she portrayed Mrs Chandler. Other silent films she appeared in for Universal Studios included The Rage of Paris (1921, as Mrs. Coolidge), Tiger True (1921, as Mrs. Lodge), The Fighting Lover (1921, as Mrs. Lydia Graham), Playing with Fire (1921, as Mrs. Taylor), The Golden Gallows (1922, as Mrs. Galliner), Forsaking All Others (1922, as Enid Morton), and Out of Luck (1923, as Aunt Edith Bristol).

Her other film work included two films for First National Pictures, Not Guilty (1921, as Mrs. Ellison) and The Cave Girl (1921, as Mrs. Georgia Case); the Goldwyn Pictures Corporation film Come On Over (1922, as Mrs. Van Dusen); and the Metro Pictures movie Cordelia the Magnificent (1923, as Mrs. Marlowe).
