= Glass Houses (1922 film) =

1922 film by Harry Beaumont

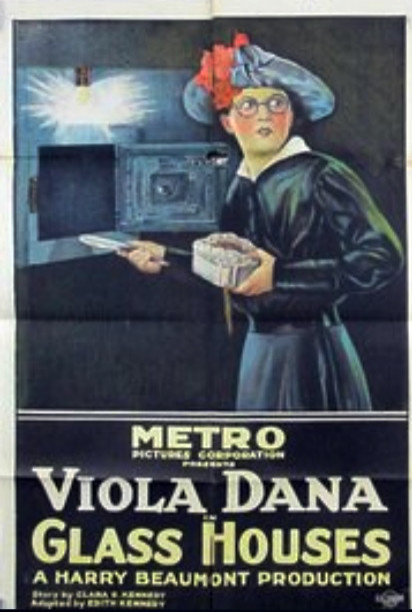
- Directed by: Harry Beaumont
- Written by: Clara Genevieve Kennedy; Edith M. Kennedy
- Starring: Viola Dana; Gaston Glass; Mayme Kelso
- Cinematography: John Arnold
- Production company: Metro Pictures
- Distributed by: Metro Pictures
- Release date: March 6, 1922
- Running time: 50 minutes
- Country: United States
- Languages: Silent; English intertitles

Glass Houses is a 1922 American silent comedy film directed by Harry Beaumont and starring Viola Dana, Gaston Glass and Mayme Kelso.

== Cast ==
- Viola Dana as Joy Duval
- Gaston Glass as Billy Norton
- Mayme Kelso as Aunt Harriet
- Helen Lynch as Cicily Duval
- Claire Du Brey as Mrs. Vicky
- Ellsworth Gage as Orville King
- John Steppling as The Lawyer

== Bibliography ==
- Munden, Kenneth White. The American Film Institute Catalog of Motion Pictures Produced in the United States, Part 1. University of California Press, 1997.
