= Clara Genevieve Kennedy =

American screenwriter

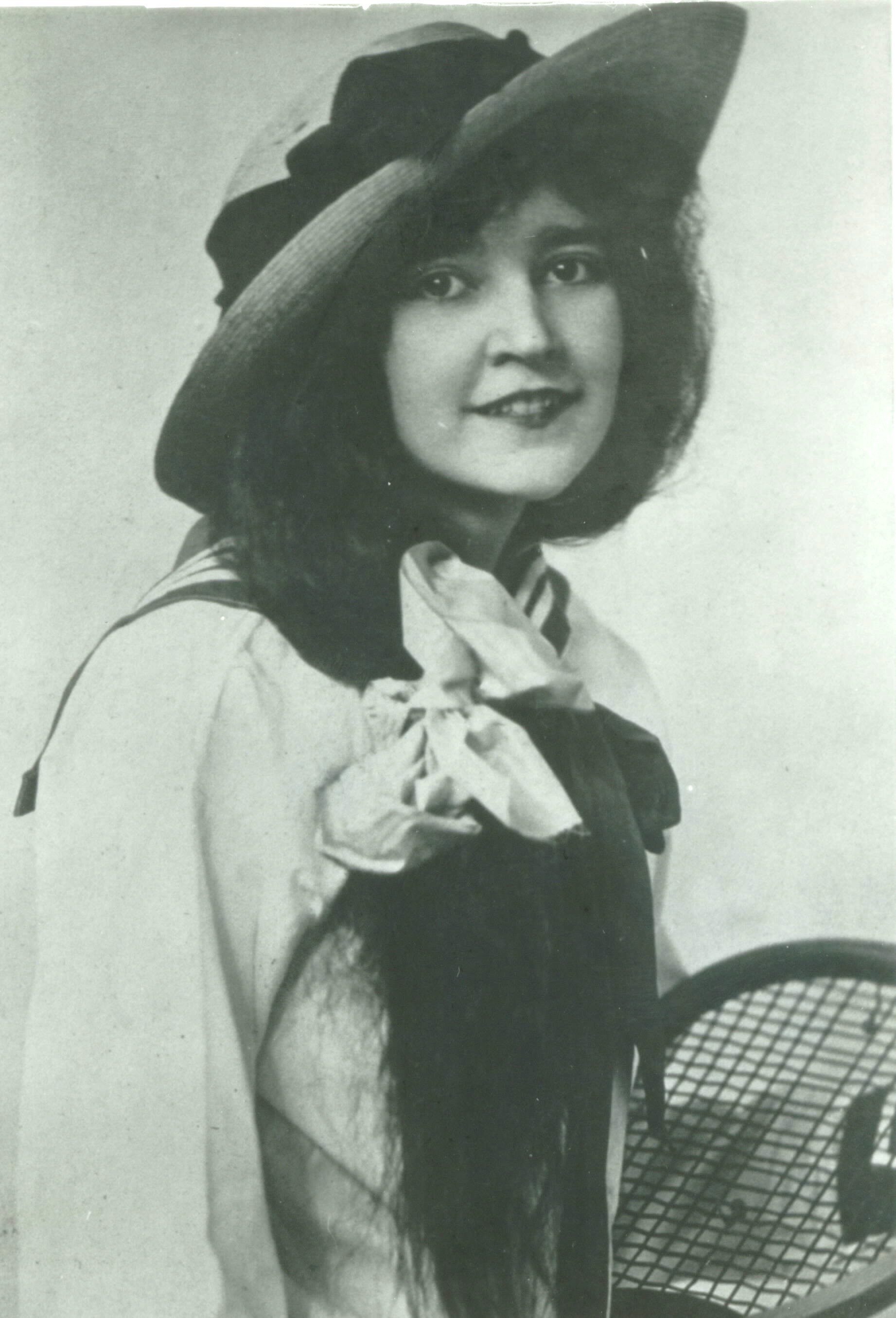
- Born: November 23, 1892; Monteagle, Tennessee, USA
- Died: November 9, 1982 (aged 89); Hanford, California, USA
- Occupation: Screenwriter
- Spouse: Ivan Melville Terwilliger (m. 1922)
- Relatives: Edith Kennedy

Clara Genevieve Kennedy was an American screenwriter and author active during Hollywood's silent era. She wrote most of her scripts for Paramount.

== Biography ==
Clara was born in Monteagle, Tennessee, to Frederick Kennedy and Clara Lane. Her sister was screenwriter Edith Kennedy. She married Rev. Ivan Melville Terwilliger in Los Angeles in 1922; the pair had two children. She died in Hanford, California, in 1982.

== Selected filmography ==
- Glass Houses (1922)
- Eyes of the Heart (1920)
- A City Sparrow (1920)
- Sick Abed (1920)
- The Dancin' Fool (1920)
- Double Speed (1920)
- You're Fired (1919)
- An Innocent Adventuress (1919)
