= Tiger True =

1921 film directed by J. P. McGowan

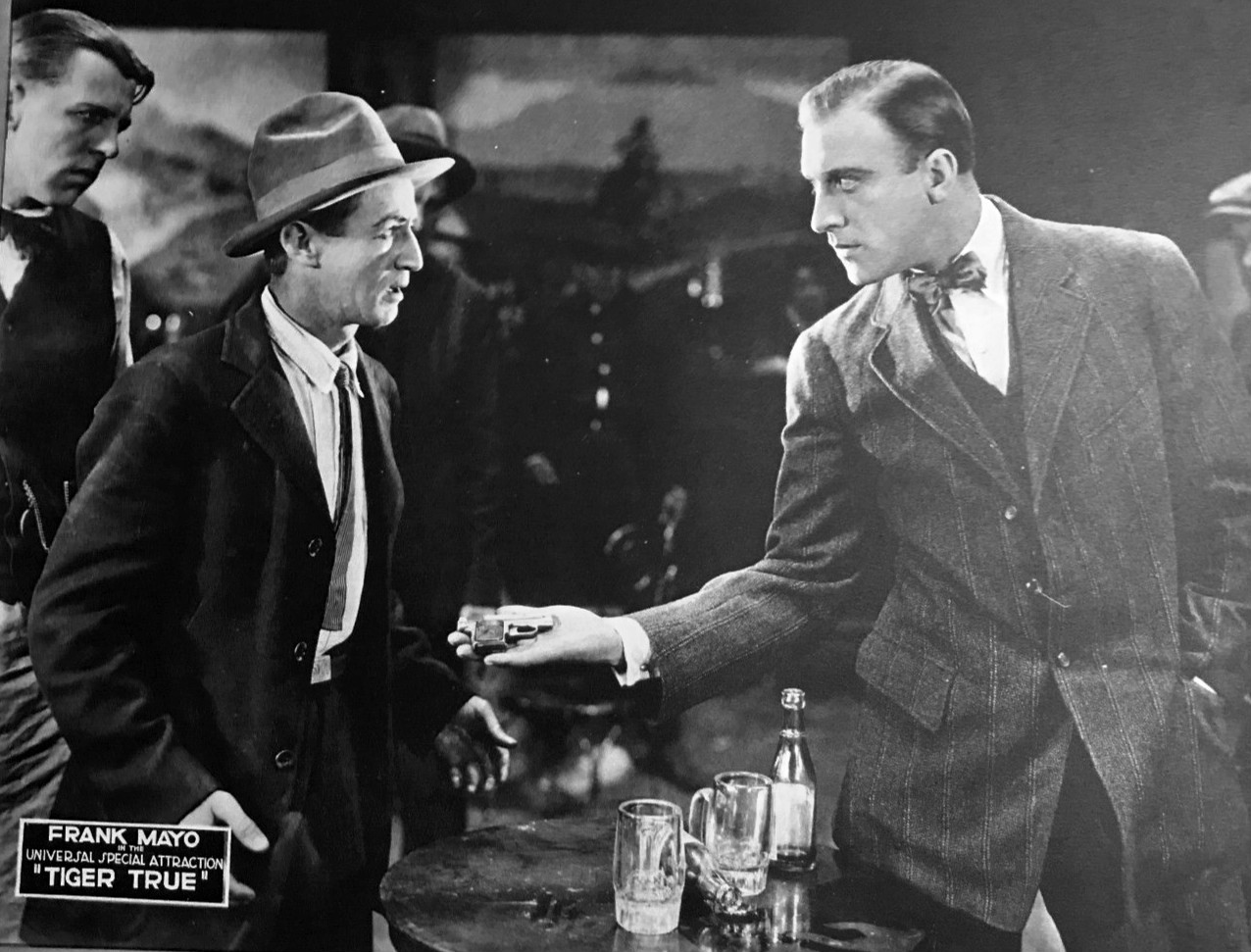
- Directed by: J.P. McGowan
- Written by: Max Brand (story); George C. Hull
- Starring: Frank Mayo; Fritzi Brunette; Elinor Hancock
- Cinematography: John W. Brown
- Edited by: Frank Lawrence; Edward Schroeder
- Production company: Universal Pictures
- Distributed by: Universal Pictures
- Release date: January 1921
- Running time: 50 minutes
- Country: United States
- Languages: Silent; English intertitles

Tiger True is a lost 1921 American silent mystery film directed by J.P. McGowan and starring Frank Mayo, Fritzi Brunette and Elinor Hancock.

== Cast ==
- Frank Mayo as Jack Lodge
- Fritzi Brunette as Mary Dover
- Elinor Hancock as Mrs. Lodge
- Al Kaufman as Larry Boynton
- Walter Long as Old Whitey / The Baboon
- Charles Brinley as McGuire
- Herbert Bethew as Sanford
- Henry A. Barrows as Mr. Lodge

== Preservation ==
With no holdings located in archives, Tiger True is considered a lost film.

== Bibliography ==
- Connelly, Robert B. The Silents: Silent Feature Films, 1910-36, Volume 40, Issue 2. December Press, 1998.
- Munden, Kenneth White. The American Film Institute Catalog of Motion Pictures Produced in the United States, Part 1. University of California Press, 1997.
