= Eyes of the Heart (film) =

1920 film directed by Paul Powell

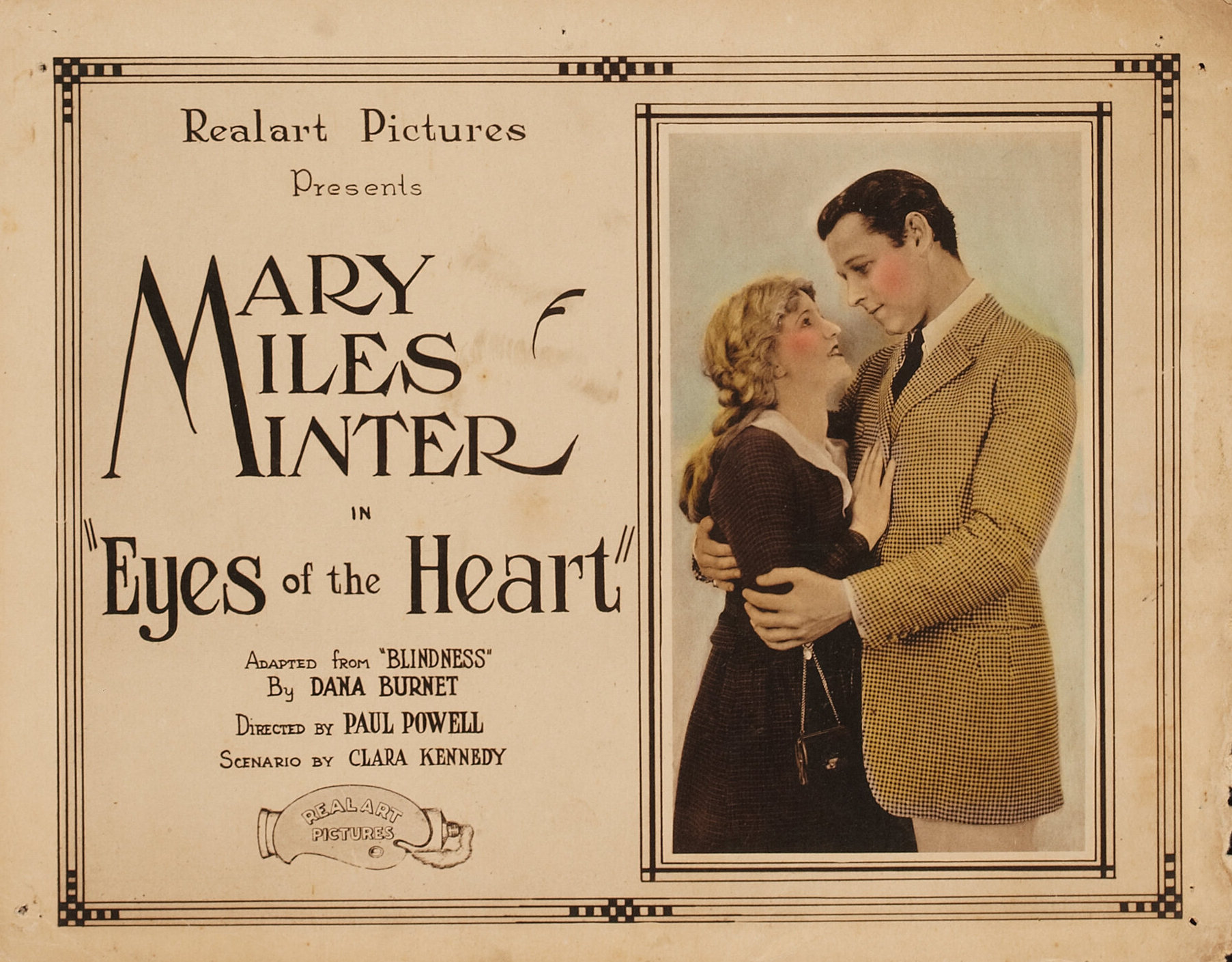
- Lobby card
- Directed by: Paul Powell
- Screenplay by: Clara Genevieve Kennedy
- Based on: Blindness by Dana Burnet
- Starring: Mary Miles Minter; Edmund Burns; Burton Law
- Cinematography: William Marshall
- Production company: Realart Pictures Corporation
- Distributed by: Realart Pictures Corporation
- Release date: October 31, 1920
- Running time: 5 reels
- Country: United States
- Language: Silent (English intertitles)

Eyes of the Heart is a 1920 American silent crime film directed by Paul Powell and starring Mary Miles Minter. It was adapted by Clara Genevieve Kennedy from the story "Blindness" by Dana Burnet, published in the Ladies Home Journal. As is the case with many of Minter's features, it is thought to be a lost film.

== Plot ==
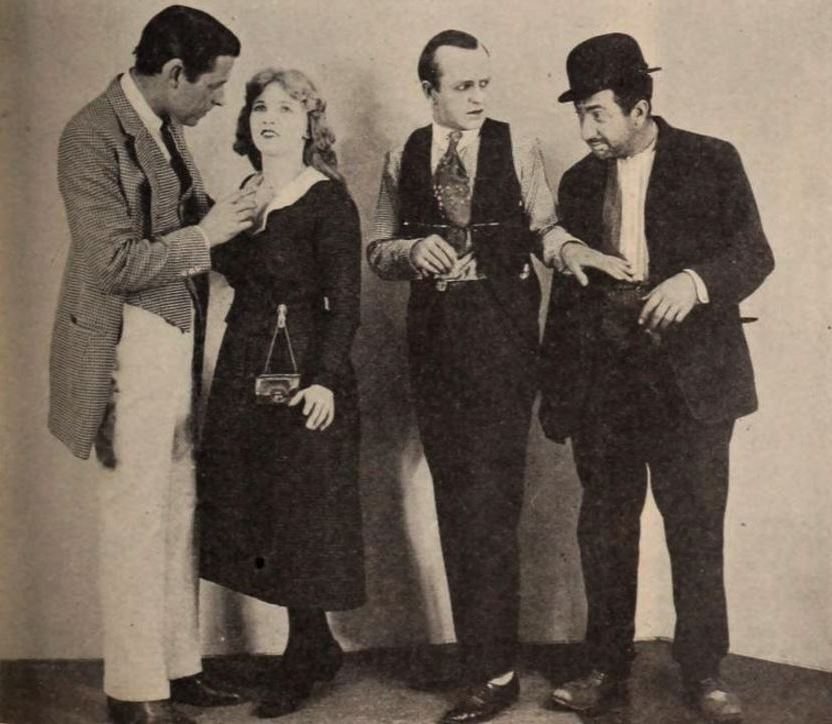
Mary Miles Minter in "Eyes of the Heart" (1920)

As described in various film magazine reviews, Laura is an orphan girl who has been blind since birth. She has been "adopted" by Simon and by three small-time crooks; Whitey, Sal and Mike, who is attracted to Laura. They convince the innocent Laura that her run-down surroundings are in fact beautiful.

Mike, Sal and Whitey manage to find the money to pay for an operation which restores Laura's sight. They are arrested and temporarily jailed, however, over suspicion as to how they obtained the money, which means they are not around when Laura sees for the first time. The shock of realising that the home she thought was beautiful is in fact sordid, and that her friends are criminals, causes Laura to temporarily lose her mind.

In this vulnerable state, she is taken advantage of by Sullivan, another criminal, who convinces Laura that helping him to crack a safe will enable her to free her friends, especially Mike. While she is doing this, her friends are released due to lack of evidence, and frantically begin to search for Laura.

Just as the safe is opened, Mike arrives, and fights and overpowers Sullivan to protect Laura. By way of thanks for saving his fortune from theft, the owner of the safe gifts Laura and her friends a ranch in the country and a chance to "go straight," and the film ends with Mike and Laura together in their new life.

== Cast ==
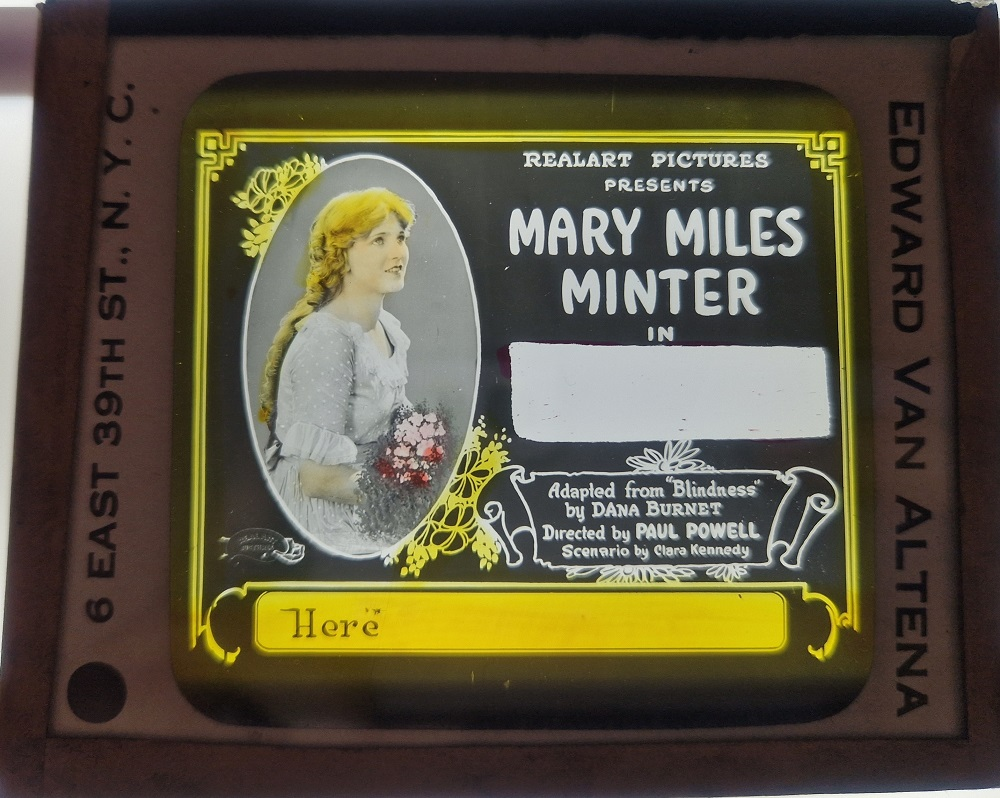
Lantern Slide for "Eyes of the Heart"

- Mary Miles Minter as Laura
- Edmund Burns as Mike Hogan
- Lucien Littlefield as Whitey
- Florence Midgley as Sal
- Burton Law as Simon
- John Cook as John Dunn
- F. A. Turner as Dr. Dewey
- William Parsons as Dennis Sullivan
- Loyola O'Connor as Mrs. Sullivan
