= Jane Goes A-Wooing =

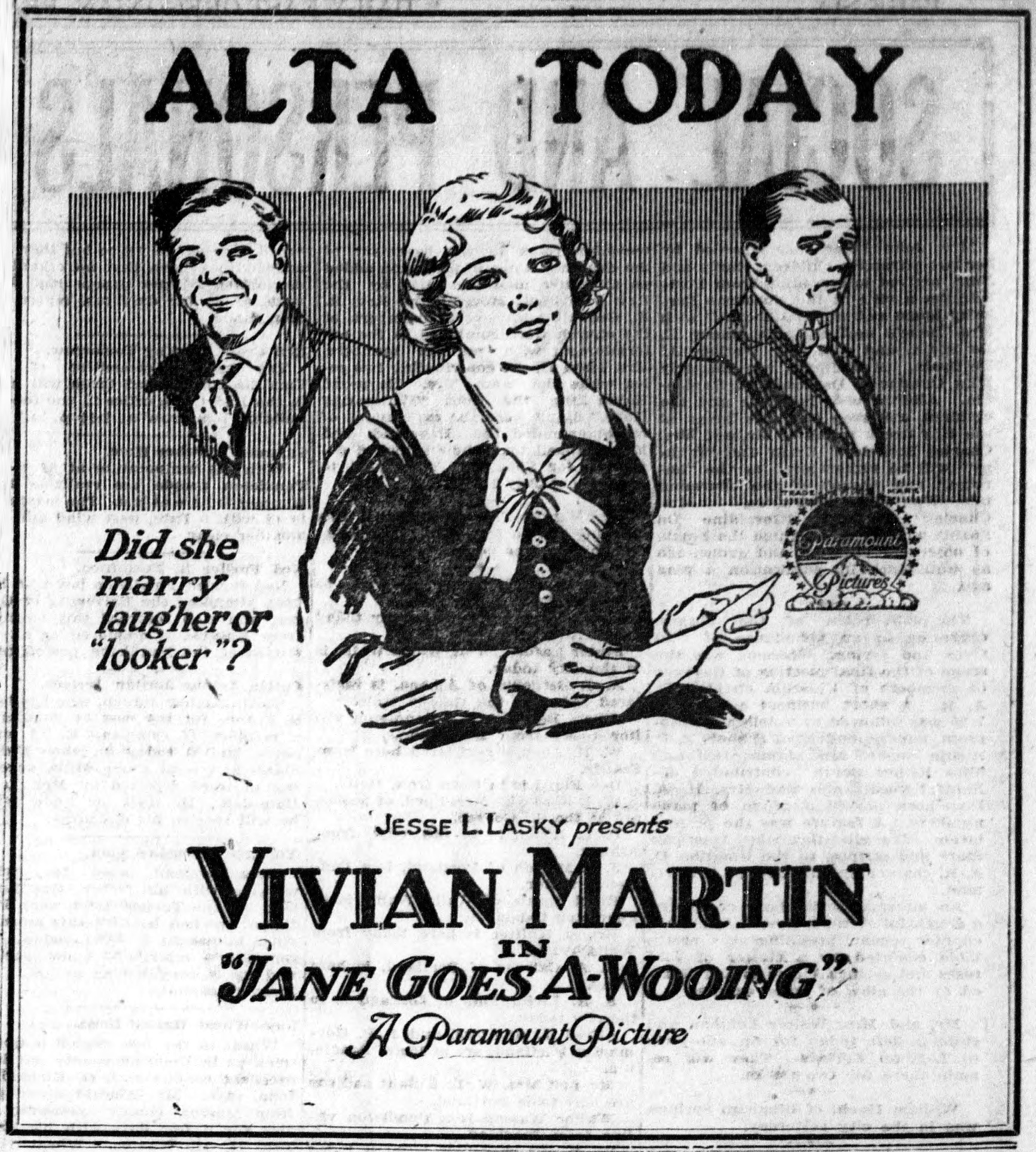
- Contemporary newspaper advertisement.
- Directed by: George Melford
- Written by: Edith Kennedy (screen story and screenplay)
- Produced by: Adolph Zukor; Jesse Lasky
- Starring: Vivian Martin
- Cinematography: Paul Perry; Henry Kotani
- Distributed by: Paramount Pictures
- Release date: January 5, 1919
- Running time: 5 reels; 4,383 feet
- Country: United States
- Language: Silent (English intertitles)

Jane Goes A-Wooing is a lost 1919 American silent society drama film produced by Famous Players–Lasky and distributed by Paramount Pictures. George Melford directed Vivian Martin in this drama.

== Plot ==
Based upon a review in a film magazine, Jane Neill goes to work for irritable old dramatist David Lyman, who is annoyed by the extravagance of his spendthrift nephew Monty Lyman. Monty throws a ball at his uncle's home while Jane is there at work, and she sees him under favorable circumstances and comes to idealize him. When the playwright dies, Jane discovers that he has left his vast property to her because of her assistance in his last great work. Believing through her infatuated eyes that Monty is the rightful heir, she sets out to reform him before turning over the property to him.

== Cast ==
- Vivian Martin as Jane Neill
- Niles Welch as Monty Lyman
- Casson Ferguson as Micky Donovan
- Spottiswoode Aitken as David Lyman
- Helen Dunbar as Mrs. Arliss
- Bernardine Zuber as Nita Arliss
- Clyde Benson as Harmon
- Ella McKenzie as A McKenzie Twin
- Ida Mae McKenzie as A McKenzie Twin
- Frank Hayes as Wicks
- Lila Lee
