= Double Speed =

1920 film by Sam Wood

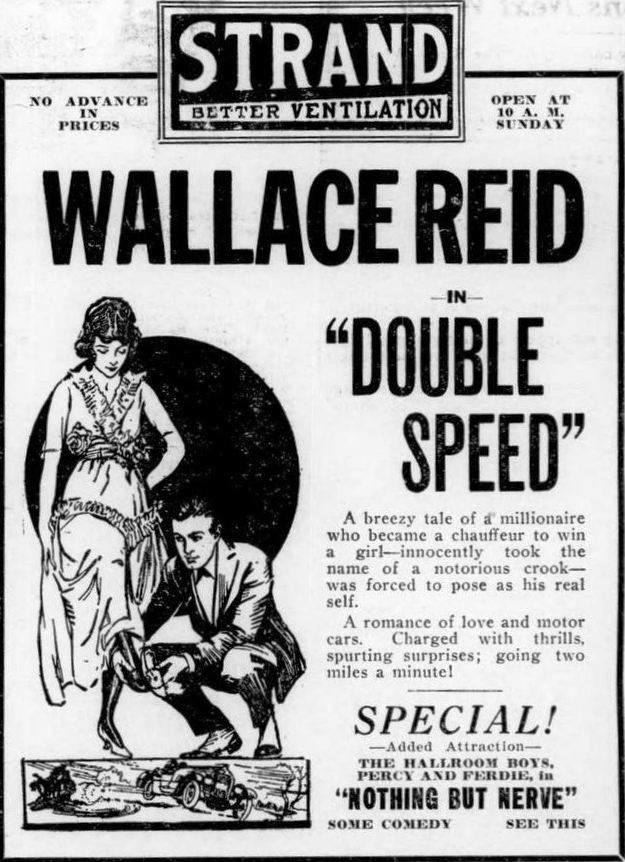
- Newspaper ad
- Directed by: Sam Wood
- Written by: J. Stewart Woodhouse (story); Clara Genevieve Kennedy (scenario); Bryon Morgan
- Produced by: Adolph Zukor; Jesse Lasky
- Starring: Wallace Reid; Wanda Hawley
- Cinematography: Alfred Gilks
- Distributed by: Paramount Pictures
- Release date: February 1, 1920
- Running time: 50 minutes; 5 reels (4,144 feet)
- Country: United States
- Language: Silent (English intertitles)

Double Speed is a lost 1920 American silent comedy-drama film produced by Famous Players–Lasky and distributed by Paramount Pictures. It was the debut directorial effort of Sam Wood and starred Wallace Reid in another of his racing car films.

== Plot ==
As described in a film magazine, Speed Carr, driving from New York to Los Angeles to visit an uncle he has not seen in twenty years, is robbed of his car, clothing, and credentials by tramps and reaches the coast penniless wearing a borrowed suit of clothes. At his uncle's bank he is refused money. Carr pawns his watch under the name Barry Cole and, adopting this name, secures a position as chauffeur for Donald McPherson, father of Sallie McPherson, with whom he has fallen in love. After they elope, he reveals his identity and his uncle appears to give his blessing.

== Cast ==
- Wallace Reid as 'Speed' Carr
- Wanda Hawley as Sallie McPherson
- Theodore Roberts as John Ogden
- Tully Marshall as Donald McPherson
- Lucien Littlefield as Reginald Toby
- Guy Oliver as Pawn Broker
- Maxine Elliott Hicks
- Teddy Tetzlaff as Race Car Driver

== See also ==
- Wallace Reid filmography
