= Giving Becky a Chance =

- Directed by: Howard Estabrook
- Screenplay by: Lois Zellner; Edith Kennedy
- Produced by: Oliver Morosco
- Starring: Vivian Martin; Jack Holt; Jack Richardson; Pietro Sosso; Alice Knowland
- Cinematography: James Van Trees
- Production company: Oliver Morosco Photoplay Company
- Distributed by: Paramount Pictures
- Release date: June 7, 1917
- Running time: 50 minutes
- Country: United States
- Language: English

Giving Becky a Chance is a 1917 American drama silent film directed by Howard Estabrook, and written by Lois Zellner and Edith Kennedy. The film stars Vivian Martin, Jack Holt, Jack Richardson, Pietro Sosso and Alice Knowland. The film was released on June 7, 1917, by Paramount Pictures.

== Plot ==
Becky Knight is the daughter of poor shopkeepers who make financial sacrifices to send her to an exclusive boarding school. Ashamed of her family's circumstances, Becky pretends to her classmates that she comes from a wealthy family. During a Christmas visit to the home of one of her school friends, she meets Dr. Tom Fielding, who falls in love with her and proposes marriage. Tom later discovers the truth about Becky's family when, during a hunting trip, he is called to treat her sick mother. Angered by Becky's deception, he breaks off their relationship. After learning that her father is in serious financial trouble, Becky takes a job as a masked dancer at a roadhouse owned by Ross Benson. On the final night of her engagement, Benson attacks Becky, but Tom arrives and intervenes. He learns that Becky had taken the job to help her father. Recognizing her sacrifice and change of character, Tom reconciles with her, and the two marry.

== Cast ==
- Vivian Martin as Becky Knight
- Jack Holt as Tom Fielding
- Jack Richardson as Ross Benson
- Pietro Sosso as Mr. Knight
- Alice Knowland as Mrs. Knight

== Censorship ==
Before Giving Becky a Chance could be exhibited in Kansas, the Kansas Board of Review required the removal of a scene where dancing girls are smoking.

== See also ==
- The House That Shadows Built (1931), a short promotional film celebrating Paramount's 20th anniversary, includes a clip from this film.
