= Out of Luck (1923 film) =

1923 American film

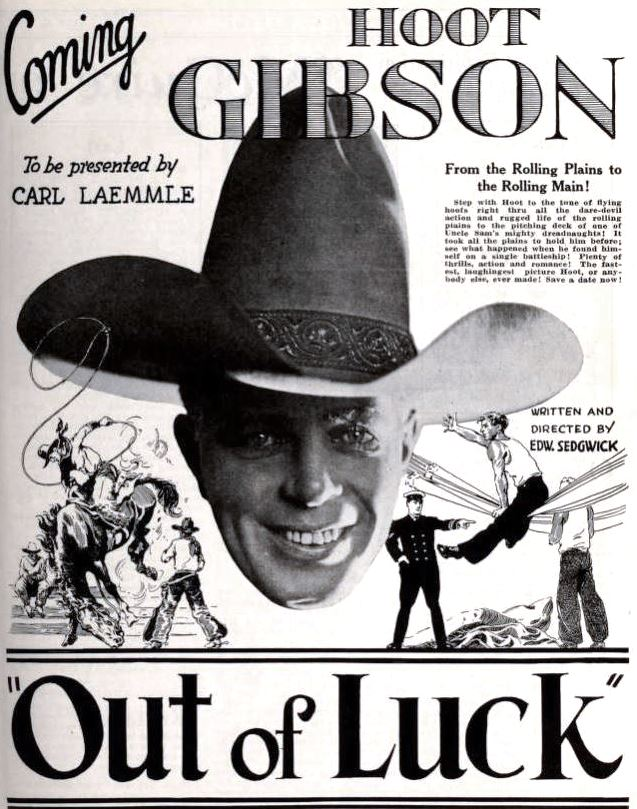
- Advertisement
- Directed by: Edward Sedgwick
- Written by: George C. Hull; Raymond L. Schrock; Edward Sedgwick
- Starring: Hoot Gibson
- Cinematography: Virgil Miller
- Distributed by: Universal Pictures
- Release date: July 23, 1923
- Running time: 60 minutes
- Country: United States
- Language: Silent (English intertitles)

Out of Luck is a 1923 American silent comedy film directed by Edward Sedgwick and starring Hoot Gibson.

== Cast ==
- Hoot Gibson as Sam Pertune
- Laura La Plante as Mae Day
- Howard Truesdale as Ezra Day (as Howard Truesdell)
- Elinor Hancock as Aunt Edith Bristol
- DeWitt Jennings as Captain Bristol
- Freeman Wood as Cyril La Mount
- Jay Morley as Boggs
- Kansas Moehring as "Kid" Hogan
- John Judd as "Pig" Hurley

== Preservation ==
With no holdings located in archives, Out of Luck is considered a lost film.
