= Oliver Onions =

English writer (1873–1961)

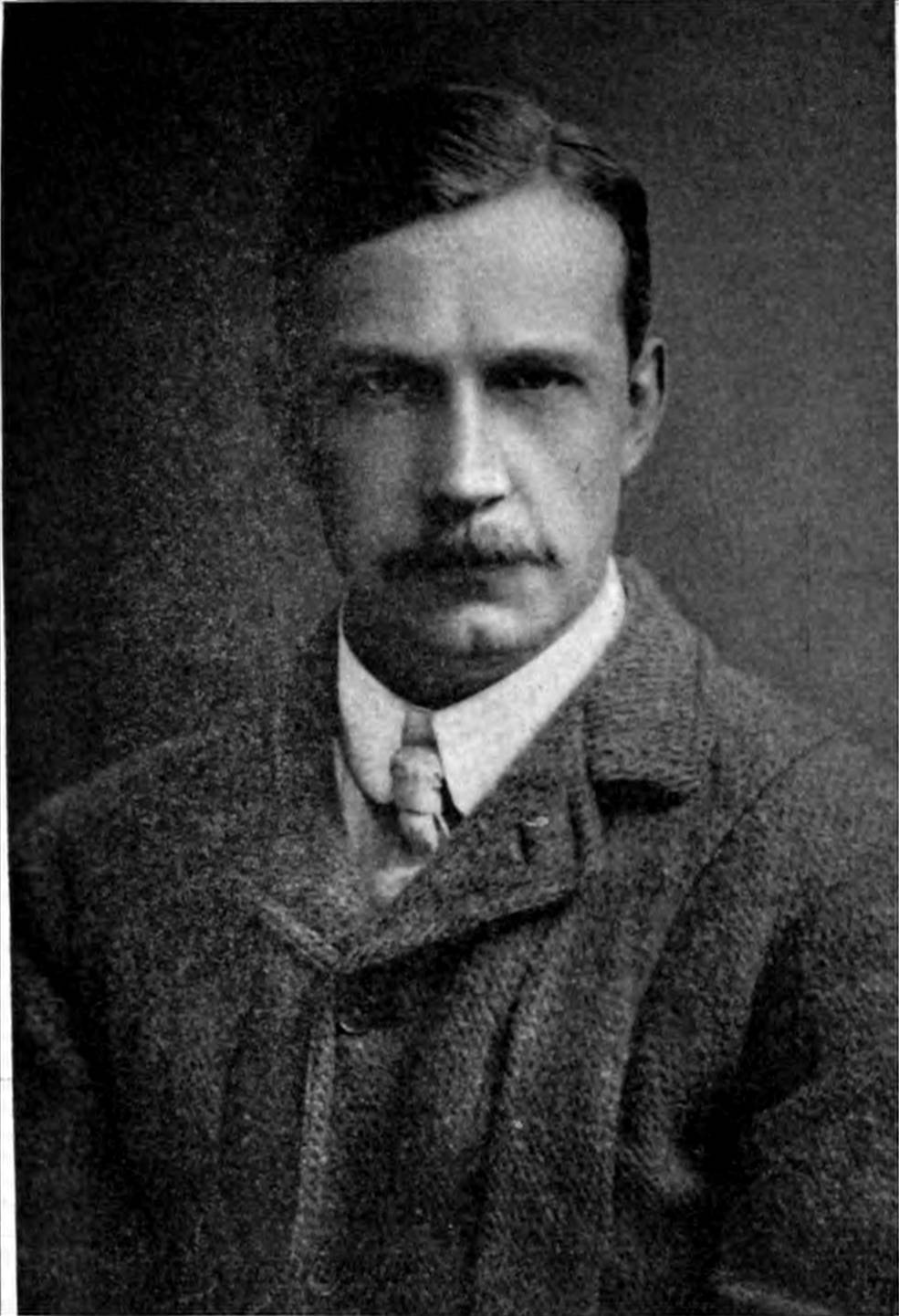
- Onions circa 1915
- Born: George Oliver Onions; 13 November 1873; Bradford, Yorkshire, England
- Died: 9 April 1961 (aged 87); Aberystwyth, Wales
- Occupation: Novelist
- Spouse: Berta Ruck (1909–1961)
- Children: 2
- Writing career
- Pen name: Oliver Onions
- Genres: Detective fiction, ghost stories, romance novels, historical fiction

George Oliver Onions (13 November 1873 – 9 April 1961), who published under the name Oliver Onions, was an English writer of short stories and novels. He wrote in various genres, but is perhaps best remembered for his ghost stories, notably the collection Widdershins and the widely anthologized novella "The Beckoning Fair One". He was married to the novelist Berta Ruck.

== Personal life ==
George Oliver Onions was born on 13 November 1873 in Bradford, Yorkshire, England, to George Frederick Onions, a bank cashier (born 1847, London, England) and Emily Alice Fearnley (born 1850, Scholes, Yorkshire, England). He studied art for three years in London at the National Arts Training Schools (now the Royal College of Art). In the book Twentieth Century Authors, Onions described his interests as motoring and science; he was also an amateur boxer as a young man.

In 1909, Onions married the writer Berta Ruck (1878–1978) and they had two sons: Arthur (born 1912) and William (born 1913). In 1918, he legally changed his name to George Oliver, but continued to publish under the name Oliver Onions.

He died on 9 April 1961 in Aberystwyth, Wales.

== Writing career ==
Originally trained as a commercial artist, he worked as a designer of posters and books and as a magazine illustrator during the Boer War. Encouraged by the American writer Gelett Burgess, Onions began writing fiction. The first editions of his novels were published with dust jackets bearing full-colour illustrations painted by Onions himself.

Poor Man's Tapestry (1946) and its prequel, Arras of Youth (1949) are about the adventures of a juggler, Robert Gandelyn, in the 14th century. The Story of Ragged Robyn (1945) focuses on the adventures of the titular stonemason at the end of the 17th century, inspired by the Yorkshire legend of Peg Fyfe. Onions wrote two detective novels: A Case in Camera and In Accordance with the Evidence. Two of his works are science fiction novels: New Moon (1918) about a utopian Britain, and The Tower of Oblivion (1921), featuring a middle-aged man who recedes back to his youth. A Certain Man (1931), about a magical suit of clothes, and A Shilling to Spend (1965), about a self-perpetuating coin, are fantasy novels.

Onions wrote several collections focusing on ghost stories and other weird fiction. The best known of these collections is Widdershins (1911). It includes the novella "The Beckoning Fair One", widely placed among the best in the genre of horror fiction, especially psychological horror. On the surface, it is a conventional haunted house story: an unsuccessful writer moves into rooms in an otherwise empty house, in the hope that isolation will help his failing creativity. His sensitivity and imagination are enhanced by his seclusion, but his art, his only friend and his sanity are all destroyed in the process. The story can be read as narrating the gradual possession of the protagonist by a mysterious and possessive feminine spirit, or as a realistic description of a psychotic outbreak culminating in catatonia and murder, told from the psychotic subject's point of view.

A theme that "The Beckoning Fair One" shares with others of Onions's stories is a connection between creativity and insanity; here the artist is in danger of withdrawing from the world altogether and losing himself in his creation. Another noted story from Widdershins is "Rooum", about an engineer pursued by a mysterious entity. Other ghost stories such as "The Cigarette Case", "The Rosewood Door" and "The Rope in the Rafters" involve time and identity shifts.

The title novella of The Painted Face (1929) concerns a Greek girl's reincarnation of an ancient spirit; Mike Ashley describes it as "one of the finest works in the genre". The collection also contains "The Master of the House", a story involving a werewolf and black magic.

A long supernatural horror novel is The Hand of Kornelius Voyt, about an isolated boy who falls under the psychic influence of a mysterious man. Onions was awarded the James Tait Black Memorial Prize for his 1946 novel Poor Man's Tapestry.

== Reception and influence ==
Onions' work has largely been well received. Gahan Wilson ranked him as "one of the best, if not the best, ghost story writers working in the English language. ... Mr. Onions did as much as anyone to move phantoms and other haunts from dark, Gothic dungeons to the very room in which you presently sit." Discussing ghost stories, Algernon Blackwood described "The Beckoning Fair One" as "the most horrible and beautiful ever written on those lines". J. B. Priestley described Widdershins as a "book of fine creepy stories". Fellow ghost story writer A. M. Burrage said of Onions' work, "There is some hair-raising stuff in Widdershins", and added "there is great literary excellence in this book, besides satisfaction for the mere seeker after thrills." Robert Aickman named "The Beckoning Fair One" as "one of the (possibly) six great masterpieces in the field". E. F. Bleiler lauded Widdershins as "a landmark book in the history of supernatural fiction". Clemence Dane stated of Onions, "His books have a lasting attraction for a reader who enjoys using his brains and his imagination." An Irish Times review of Arras of Youth stated, "Mr. Onions writes limpid and often beautiful prose." Martin Seymour-Smith described Onions's Whom God Hath Sundered trilogy as a neglected classic: "In Accordance with the Evidence is the masterpiece of the three, but the other sequels in no way disgrace it." Neil Wilson calls Onions' supernatural works "notable for their depth of psychological insight, elegant writing and sophisticated plots". Wilson notes that

'The Beckoning Fair One' (1911) is regarded by many as one of the greatest English tales of the supernatural but has overshadowed Onions' other work in the genre which some consider of equal, if not greater, importance. In fact, the majority of the author's supernatural fiction is of an extremely high standard and is notable for its originality, subtlety and careful characterizations which lift it well above the average.

On the other hand, H.P. Lovecraft's assessment of Onions' work was negative; in a 1936 letter to J. Vernon Shea, Lovecraft stated, "I have Onions' Ghosts in Daylight. ... I didn't care much for the various tales."

Karl Edward Wagner's short story "In the Pines" (1973) pays homage to Onions's "The Beckoning Fair One". "The Beckoning Fair One" was also the inspiration for a 1968 Italian/French horror film called A Quiet Place in the Country by prominent Italian director Elio Petri, starring Vanessa Redgrave and Franco Nero. Russell Hoban alludes to Onions' work in his books Her Name Was Lola and Amaryllis Night and Day.

== Selected bibliography ==
=== Novels ===
- The Compleat Bachelor (1900)
- Tales from a Far Riding (1902)
- The Odd-Job Man (1903)
- The Drakestone (1906)
- Pedlar's Pack (1908)
- The Exception (1910)
- In Accordance with the Evidence (1910)
- Good Boy Seldom: A Romance of Advertisement (1911)
- The Debit Account (1913)
- The Two Kisses: A Tale of a Very Modern Courtship (1913)
- The Story of Louie (1913)
- A Crooked Mile (1914)
- Mushroom Town (1914)
- The New Moon: A Romance of Reconstruction (1918)
- A Case in Camera (1920)
- The Tower of Oblivion (1921)
- Peace in Our Time (1923)
- The Spite of Heaven (1926)
- Cut Flowers (1927)
- Little Devil Doubt (1929)
- The Open Secret (1930)
- A Certain Man (1932)
- Catalan Circus (1934)
- The Hand of Kornelius Voyt (1939)
- Cockcrow; or, Anybody's England (1940)
- The Story of Ragged Robyn (1945)
- Poor Man's Tapestry (1946)
- Arras of Youth (1949)
- A Penny for the Harp (1952)
- A Shilling to Spend (1965)

=== Omnibus collections ===
- Admiral Eddy (1907)
- Draw in Your Stool (1909)
- Gray Youth (1913), US omnibus of The Two Kisses and A Crooked Mile
- Whom God Hath Sundered (1925), omnibus of In Accordance with the Evidence, The Debit Account and The Story of Louie
- The Italian Chest (1939)

=== Story collections ===
- Back o' the Moon (1906): "Back o’ the Moon", "The Pillers", "Skelf-Mary", "Lad-Lass", "The Fairway"
- Widdershins (1911): "The Beckoning Fair One", "Phantas", "Rooum", "Benlian", "Io", "The Accident", "The Cigarette Case", "Hic Jacet"
- Ghosts in Daylight (1924): "The Ascending Dream", "The Dear Dryad", "The Real People", "The Woman in the Way”, "The Honey in the Wall"
- The Painted Face (1929): "The Painted Face", "The Rosewood Door", "The Master of the House"
- The Collected Ghost Stories (London: Nicholson & Watson, 1935): Omnibus volume comprising Widdershins, Ghosts in Daylight and The Painted Face
- Bells Rung Backward (1953): "The Rosewood Door", "The Woman in the Way", "The Honey in the Wall", "John Gladwin Says ...", "The Painted Face"
- Ghost Stories (2003), introduced by Rosalie Parker: "Credo", "The Beckoning Fair One", "Phantas", "Rooum", "Benlian", "Io" ("The Lost Thyrsus"), "The Accident", "The Cigarette Case", "Hic Jacet", "The Rocker", "The Ascending Dream", "Dear Dryad", "The Real People", "The Woman in the Way", "The Honey in the Wall", "John Gladwin Says ...", "The Painted Face", "The Rosewood Door", "The Smile of Karen", "The Out-Sister", "The Rope in the Rafters", "Resurrection in Bronze", "Tragic Casements"

== Sources ==
- Leonard R. N. Ashley, "Onions, (George) Oliver (1873–1961)", Oxford Dictionary of National Biography, Oxford University Press, 2004
- Oliver Onions (George Oliver) at Fantasticfiction.com
