= The Trust (1915 film) =

1915 film

- Directed by: Lon Chaney
- Written by: Katherine M. Kingsherry
- Starring: Lon Chaney; Vera Sisson
- Distributed by: Universal Pictures
- Release date: July 16, 1915
- Running time: 1 reel (10 minutes)
- Country: United States
- Language: Silent with English intertitles

The Trust is a 1915 American short silent drama film directed by Lon Chaney and written by Katherine M. Kingsherry. It starred Lon Chaney and Vera Sisson. The film was also called The Truce in some magazine reviews. The film is today considered to be lost. A still exists showing Chaney as Jim Mason, hanging out in a bar with his criminal associates.

== Plot ==
Jim Mason's marriage is ruined because his wife cannot control her spending, and he is forced to become a thief. His first job is to steal the famous Allison pearls, but while robbing the house, he meets Florence Allison, whose marriage is unravelling due to her husband's neglect. Jim, recalling his own tragic marriage, suggests a plan that Florence can use to win back her husband's love. In return, she tells Jim if his plan succeeds, she will let him keep the pearls.

When Mr. Allison returns home after a night on the town, he finds his wife tied up and unconscious, and realizing how his neglect has now endangered her life, he swears off his carousing and returns to a happy marriage with his wife. As the months pass, Jim resists the temptation to sell the pearls. Bill, one of Jim's criminal acquaintances, is convinced that Jim has the pearls and they fight over them. Jim is injured, and drags himself to the Allison home. There he finds that Florence has won back the love of her husband, and she thanks Jim and tells him that he can keep the pearls.

== Cast ==
- Vera Sisson as Florence Allison
- Lon Chaney as Jim Mason
- T. D. Crittenden as Howard Allison
- William Quinn as Bill

== Reception ==
"There is some vagueness in the construction, but as a whole the story prove quite entertaining and has some novelty in it." --- Moving Picture World

"This story is rather ineffective as it develops with undo rapidity." --- Motion Picture News
