= A Petticoat Pilot =

- Directed by: Rollin S. Sturgeon
- Screenplay by: Joseph C. Lincoln; Gardner Hunting
- Produced by: Jesse L. Lasky
- Starring: Vivian Martin; Theodore Roberts; James Neill; Harrison Ford; Bert Hadley; Tom Bates
- Cinematography: James Van Trees
- Production company: Pallas Pictures
- Distributed by: Paramount Pictures
- Release date: February 4, 1918
- Running time: 50 minutes
- Country: United States
- Language: English

A Petticoat Pilot is a lost 1918 American comedy silent film directed by Rollin S. Sturgeon and written by Joseph C. Lincoln and Gardner Hunting. The film stars Vivian Martin, Theodore Roberts, James Neill, Harrison Ford, Bert Hadley and Tom Bates. The film was released on February 4, 1918, by Paramount Pictures.

== Cast ==
- Vivian Martin as Mary-'Gusta
- Theodore Roberts as 'Cap'n Shad' Gould
- James Neill as Zoeth Hamilton
- Harrison Ford as Crawford Smith
- Bert Hadley as Edgar Fuller
- Tom Bates as Isaiah
- Helen Gilmore as Mrs. Hobbs
- John Burton as Judge Baxter
- Richard Henry Cummings as Rastus Young
- Jane Wolfe as Mrs. Young
- Cecil Lionel as Mr. Bacheldor
- Jane Keckley as Mrs. Bacheldor
- Antrim Short as Jimmie Bacheldor
- Clarice Urhe as Miss Keith
- R.O. Pennell as John Keith
- Billy Crary
- Elinor Hancock
- Jack Lott
