= Vivian Martin =

American actress (1893–1987)

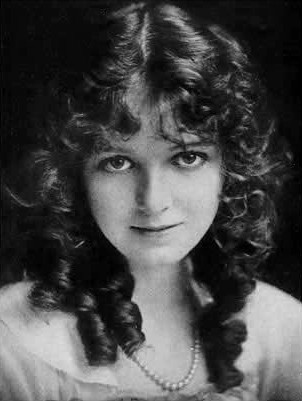
- Martin, c. 1916
- Born: Vivian Louise Martin; July 22, 1891; Grand Rapids, Michigan, U.S.
- Died: March 16, 1987 (aged 93); New York City, New York, U.S.
- Occupation: Actress
- Years active: 1901–1935
- Spouses: William Jefferson (m. 1913; div. 1920); Arthur Hiram Samuels (m. 1926; died 1938)

Vivian Louise Martin (July 22, 1891 – March 16, 1987) was an American stage and silent film actress.

== Early life and career ==
Born and raised in Grand Rapids, Michigan, Martin was the daughter of Grace Gibbs and actor George Herbert Martin. She began her career as a child actress on the stage with comedian Lew Fields.

In 1901, at age 10, Martin made her stage debut alongside Richard Mansfield in Cyrano de Bergerac. Two years later, she played the title character in Little Lord Fauntleroy. Other early stage credits include Stop Thief, Officer 666, and The Only Son, as well as the title role in Peter Pan, which Martin played for two years after succeeding Maude Adams. Her work on Broadway began with Tom Moore (1901) and ended with Marry the Man (1929).

A blonde, Martin entered the motion picture industry in 1914. Her first role was in The Wishing Ring: An Idyll of Old England (1914) for the World Film Company, in which she played Sally, a parson's daughter. Martin subsequently became a contract player for the Famous Players Film Company, where she achieved popularity as a rival to Mary Pickford. Among her other credits are The Third Kiss (1919), Her Official Fiancee (1919), The Innocent Adventuress (1919), and Louisiana (1919). She made forty-four movies in all, including some for the Fox Film Corporation.

In the early 1920s, Martin started her own production company and released her films through the Goldwyn Corporation. Her career entered into a downward spiral soon afterwards as a result of a lawsuit for payment of studio rentals. Although eventually settled out of court, the case did irreparable damage to her standing among her peers.

In April 1921 Martin left movies and returned to the stage. Her theatrical revival began with a three-act comedy entitled First Night Out by Adelaide Matthews and Ann Nichols.

Several of Martin's early and rare films survive at the Library of Congress.

== Personal life and death ==
On May 11, 1913, the 21-year-old Martin married actor William Jefferson, son of Joseph Jefferson and former husband of actress Christie MacDonald. They divorced in 1920. From February 28, 1926, until his death in March 1938, Martin's husband was advertising writer, magazine editor, radio executive, and erstwhile composer Arthur Hiram Samuels.

Martin died in New York City in 1987, aged 95. A paid death notice in the New York Times acknowledged her longstanding association with the Professional Children's School in New York, both as kindred spirit/role model and generous financial donor.

== Filmography ==
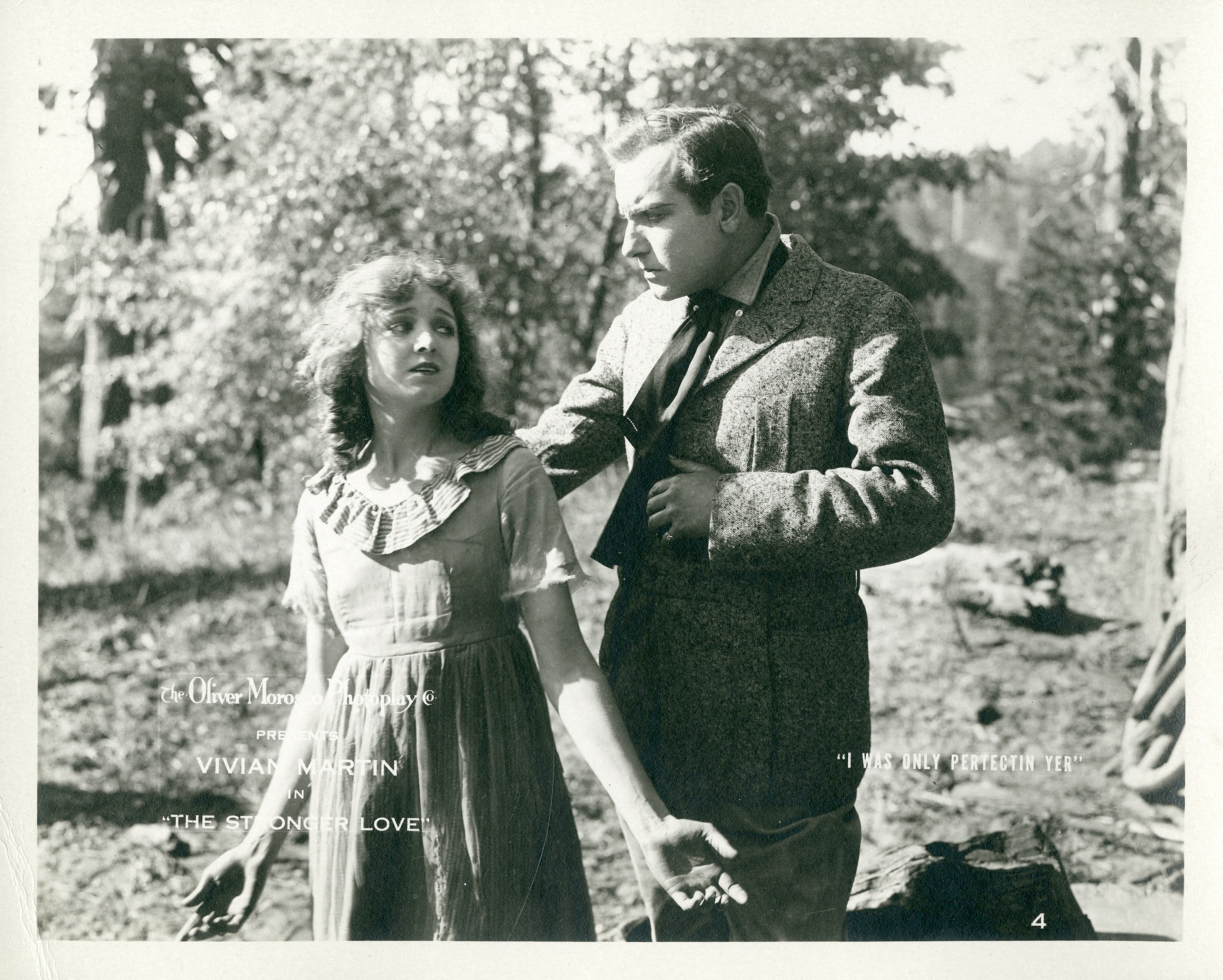
Lobby card for The Stronger Love (1916)

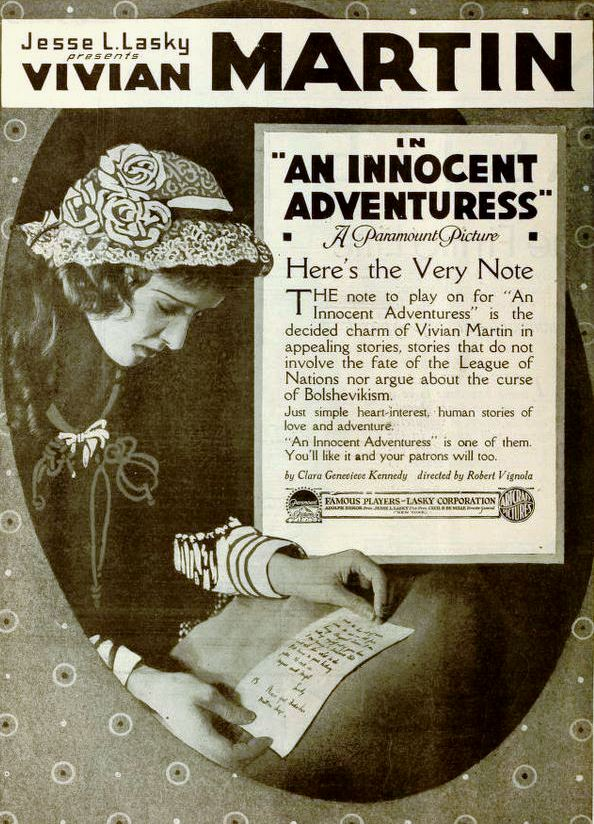
An Innocent Adventuress (1919)

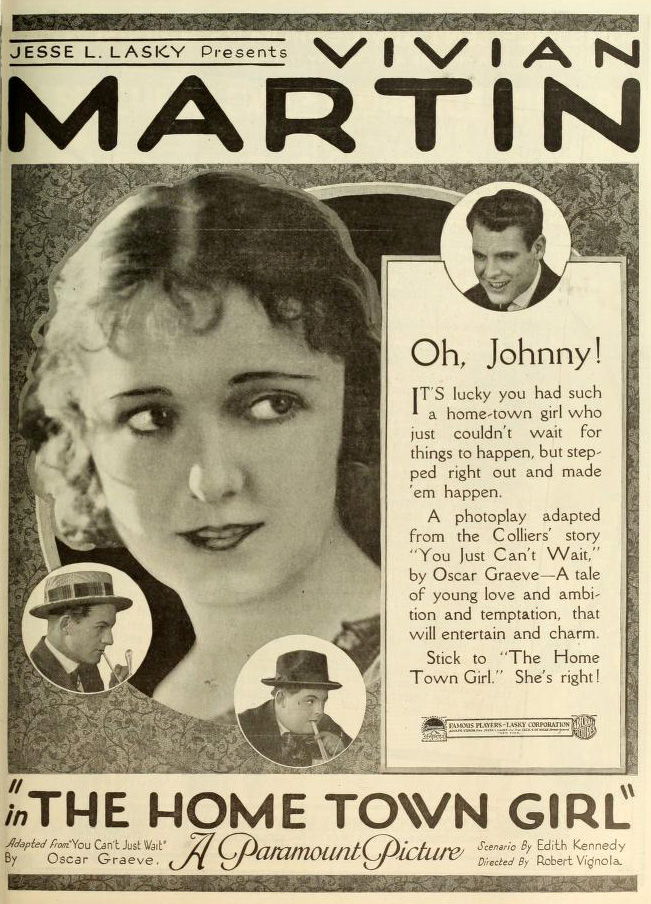
Advertisement for The Home Town Girl (1919)

- The Wishing Ring (1914)
- Old Dutch (1915)
- The Arrival of Perpetua (1915)
- An Indian Diamond (1915)
- The Little Miss Brown (1915)
- The Little Dutch Girl (1915)
- The Little Mademoiselle (1915)
- The Butterfly on the Wheel (1915)
- Over Night (1915)
- Merely Mary Ann (1916)
- A Modern Thelma (1916)
- The Stronger Love (1916)
- Her Father's Son (1916)
- The Right Direction (1916)
- The Wax Model (1917)
- The Spirit of Romance (1917)
- The Girl at Home (1917)
- Giving Becky a Chance (1917)
- Forbidden Paths (1917)
- A Kiss for Susie (1917)
- Little Miss Optimist (1917)
- The Trouble Buster (1917)
- The Sunset Trail (1917)
- Molly Entangled (1917)
- The Fair Barbarian (1917)
- A Petticoat Pilot (1918)
- Unclaimed Goods (1918)
- Viviette (1918)
- Her Country First (1918)
- Mirandy Smiles (1918)
- Jane Goes A-Wooing (1919)
- You Never Saw Such a Girl (1919)
- Little Comrade (1919)
- The Home Town Girl (1919)
- An Innocent Adventuress (1919)
- Louisiana (1919)
- The Third Kiss (1919)
- His Official Fiancée (1919)
- Husbands and Wives (1920)
- The Song of the Soul (1920)
- Mother Eternal (1921)
- Pardon My French (1921)
- Soiled (1925)
- Folies Bergere de Paris (1934) (uncredited role)
