= Pal o' Mine =

1924 film by Edward LeSaint

- Directed by: Edward Le Saint
- Screenplay by: Edith Kennedy
- Produced by: Harry Cohn
- Starring: Irene Rich; Josef Swickard; Willard Louis
- Distributed by: Columbia Pictures
- Release date: March 1, 1924 (USA)

Pal O' Mine is a 1924 drama-romance 6-reel film produced by Columbia Pictures. The film was directed by Edward Le Saint and written by Edith Kennedy. The film was released on March 1, 1924.

== Production and release ==
The film was directed by Edward Le Saint, one of the earliest directors to work with Columbia Pictures. Edith Kennedy wrote the film's screenplay. It was theatrically released in North American cinemas on March 1, 1924.

== Preservation and status ==
A complete copy of the film is held at the Library of Congress.

== Bibliography ==
- Bernard F. Dick (1992). Columbia Pictures: Portrait of a Studio. University Press of Kentucky. ISBN 978-0-8131-1769-0.
- Len D. Martin (1991). Columbia Checklist: The Feature Films, Serials, Cartoons, and Short Subjects of Columbia Pictures Corporation, 1922-1988. McFarland. ISBN 978-0-89950-556-5.
