= The Married Virgin =

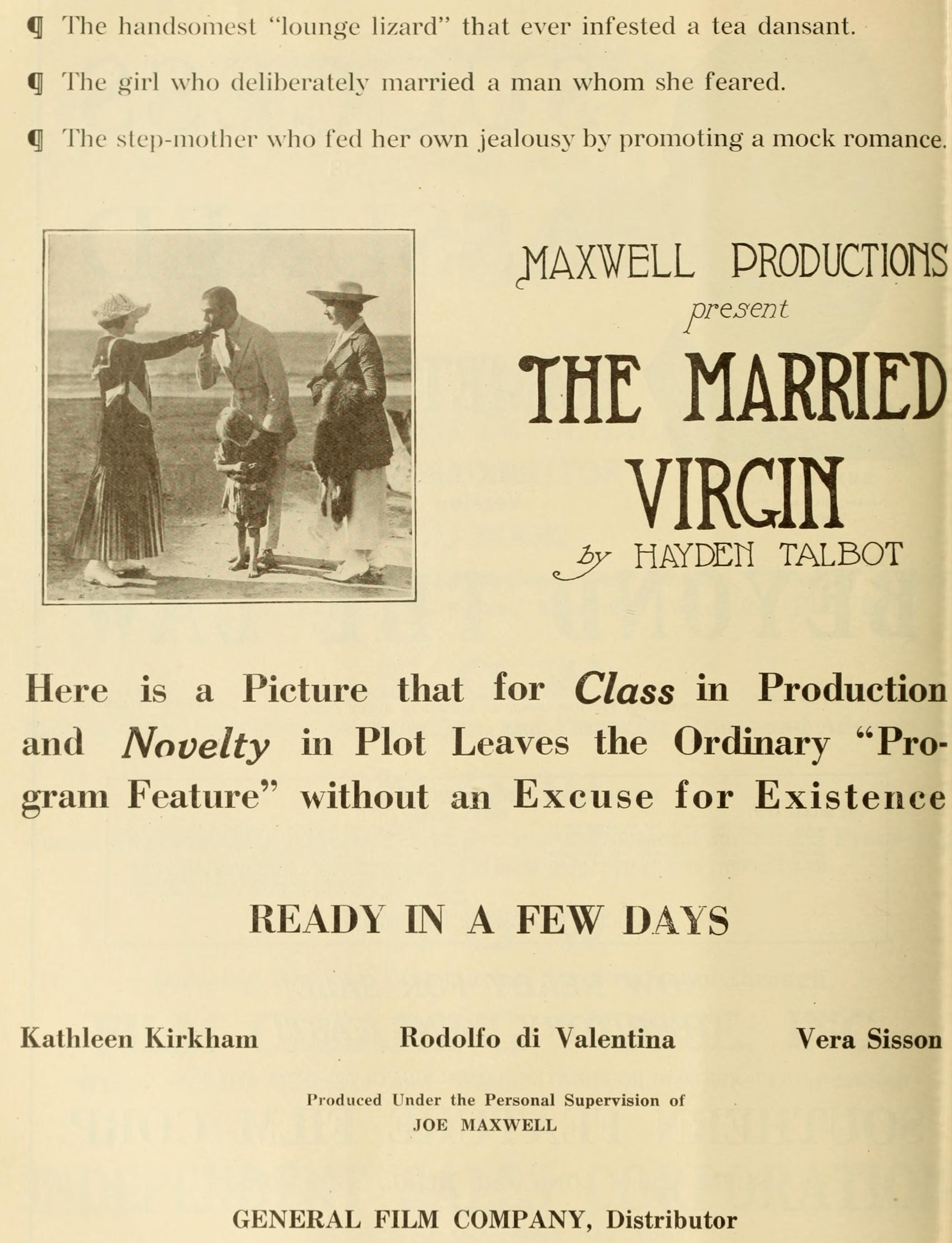
- Advertisement from The Moving Picture World
- Directed by: Joe Maxwell
- Screenplay by: Hayden Talbot
- Story by: Hayden Talbot
- Starring: Vera Sisson; Rodolfo di Valentina; Frank Newburg; Kathleen Kirkham; Edward Jobson; Lillian Leighton
- Music by: Brian Benison (new score 2000)
- Production company: Maxwell Productions
- Distributed by: General Film Company
- Release date: December 1918
- Running time: 71 minutes
- Country: United States
- Languages: Silent; English intertitles

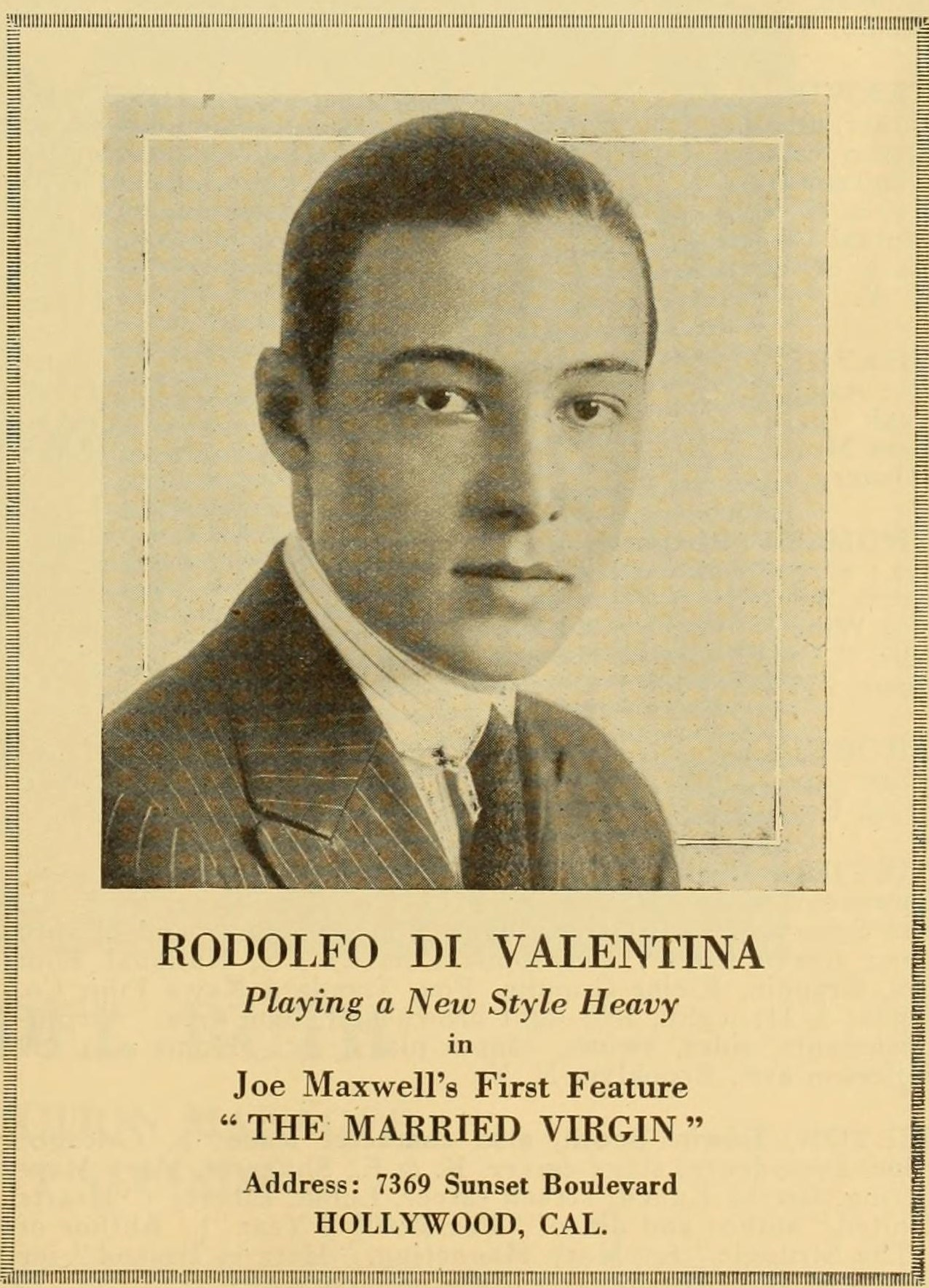
Valentino in an advertisement for the film.

The Married Virgin (also known as Frivolous Wives) is a 1918 American silent drama film starring Vera Sisson, Kathleen Kirkham and Rudolph Valentino (credited as Rodolfo di Valentina). During the early part of his career, Valentino was often cast as a villain or "heavy"; his part in The Married Virgin reflects this typecasting.

== Synopsis ==
Mary McMillan (Sisson) is the daughter of tycoon John McMillan (Jobson). She is deeply in love with Douglas McKee (Newburg), a promising young lawyer. Mary's dour "evil stepmother", Ethel (Kirkham) is carrying on an affair with the diabolical Count Roberto di San Fraccini (Valentino).

John McMillan is wracked with guilt over his involvement in a violent skirmish, in which a man was killed. While McMillan was not responsible for the murder, he did fire a weapon in the scuffle, and fears he could be implicated. He keeps the gun he used locked away in a safe in his office.

Ethel knows the secret, and shares it with Roberto. They arrange to have the weapon stolen from the office and extort McMillan for money for its safe and quiet return. McMillan meets with Roberto, but refuses his demands for money.

The lovers move on to Plan B, which involves the virtuous Mary. They plot to force Mary to marry Roberto, and use the dowry to escape to Argentina together. Mary is understandably reluctant to go along with the plan, but eventually acquiesces to save her father from a life sentence in prison. She writes to Douglas, calling off their engagement, sadly marries Roberto and retires to an unhappy existence in her home.

Roberto, at first, promises to stay away from Mary until she comes to him of her own free will. Eventually, when it is apparent Mary wants nothing to do with him, he attempts to break into her room and rape her. She is saved only through the intervention of the kindly family servant, Annie (Leighton).

Ethel grows increasingly jealous of the attention, albeit unwanted, that Mary is receiving from Roberto. On a drive through the hills, she brandishes a bottle of poison and threatens to use it unless Roberto takes the next boat to South America with her. Roberto attempts to take the bottle away from her, a struggle ensues, and the car loses control and tumbles off a cliff, killing Ethel. Meanwhile, Douglas works tirelessly to clear McMillan and save Mary. He meets with Roberto, who agrees to permanently leave, dowry money in hand. He and Mary have a happy reconciliation.

Eventually, McMillan is completely exonerated. Mary's marriage to Roberto is annulled because the marriage was never consummated, and she is free to marry Douglas.

== Cast (in credits order) ==
- Vera Sisson as Mary McMillan
- Rodolfo di Valentini as Count Roberto di San Fraccini
- Frank Newburg as Douglas McKee
- Kathleen Kirkham as Mrs. McMillan
- Edward Jobson as John McMillan
- Lillian Leighton as Anne Mullins, the Maid

== Production ==
The film was shot at the Hotel del Coronado.

== Release ==
General Film Company announced plans to release the film in December 1918 but the film may have been shelved. The rights to the film were then acquired by Fidelity Pictures Company in 1920. The Married Virgin was subsequently re-edited (from seven reels to six reels) and released under the title its original title and under the new title Frivolous Wives. After Valentino became a star in 1921, the film's director Joe Maxwell released the re-edited version again to capitalize on Valentino's fame.

Film preservationist David Shepard later discovered the footage believed to have been cut from the original release in Belgium, Luxembourg, and at the Library of Congress. Shepard re-added the footage to the edited print to recreate the original print of The Married Virgin.

== Preservation status ==
A print of The Married Virgin still survives and is held at the Library of Congress. The film has been screened at various film festivals, and has been made available to the public on both VHS and DVD.
