= Molly Entangled =

- Directed by: Robert Thornby
- Screenplay by: Edith M. Kennedy
- Produced by: Jesse L. Lasky
- Starring: Vivian Martin; Harrison Ford; Noah Beery, Sr. G.S. Spaulding; Helen Dunbar; Gibson Gowland
- Cinematography: James Van Trees
- Production company: Pallas Pictures
- Distributed by: Paramount Pictures
- Release date: November 19, 1917
- Running time: 50 minutes
- Country: United States
- Language: Silent (English intertitles)

Molly Entangled is a 1917 American silent drama film directed by Robert Thornby and written by Edith M. Kennedy. The film stars Vivian Martin, Harrison Ford, Noah Beery, Sr., G.S. Spaulding, Helen Dunbar, and Gibson Gowland. The film was released on November 19, 1917, by Paramount Pictures. It is not known whether the film currently survives.

== Plot ==
As described in a film magazine, there is constant strife between the families of Barry and O'Mara. If Jim Barry dies without marrying, the family fortune will revert to the son of the O'Maras. Jim gets intoxicated one night and slips down the cellar stairs, severely injuring himself. After the town doctor predicts that he will die, so to save the fortune Mrs. Barry calls Molly Shawn and asks her to marry Jim. Because the Barrys had done much for her family, Molly consents even though she loves Barney Malone. Jim is taken to the city, is operated on, and gets well. Molly is disappointed but, knowing it can be no other way, lives on as Mrs. Jim Barry. One day Jim learns that the marriage ceremony had been performed by a tramp endeavoring to escape justice, so he gives Molly her freedom and she and Barney make preparations for their wedding.

== Cast ==
- Vivian Martin as Molly Shawn
- Harrison Ford as Barney Malone
- Noah Beery, Sr. as Shawn
- G.S. Spaulding as Jim Barry
- Helen Dunbar as Mrs. Barry
- Gibson Gowland as O'Mara
- William A. Carroll as Leary
- Jane Keckley as Mrs. O'Mara
