= The Dancin' Fool =

1920 film by Sam Wood

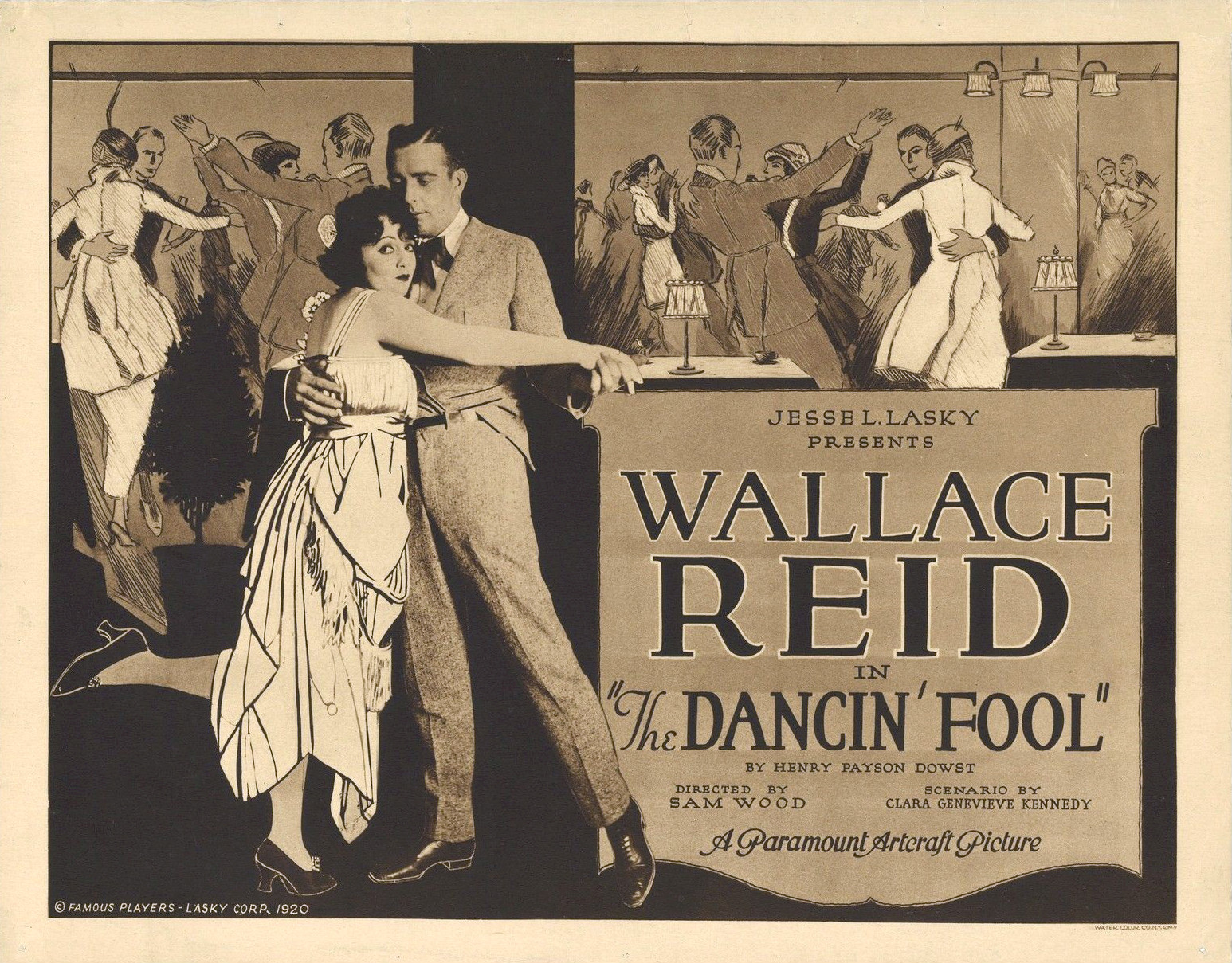
- Lobby card
- Directed by: Sam Wood
- Written by: Henry Payson Dowst (story); Clara Genevieve Kennedy (adaptation, scenario)
- Produced by: Adolph Zukor; Jesse L. Lasky
- Starring: Wallace Reid; Bebe Daniels
- Cinematography: Alfred Gilks
- Distributed by: Paramount/Artcraft
- Release date: May 2, 1920
- Running time: 50 minutes; 5 reels
- Country: United States
- Language: Silent (English intertitles)

The Dancin' Fool is a surviving 1920 American silent romantic comedy film produced by Famous Players–Lasky and distributed by Paramount Pictures. Sam Wood directed this one of his earliest efforts. Wallace Reid and Bebe Daniels star, at the time Paramount was making them a popular team in replacement of Reid's previous female lead Ann Little. A copy of this film survives in the collection of the Museum of Modern Art, New York.

== Plot ==
As described in a film publication, Sylvester Tibble, a country yokel, comes to New York City to work at his uncle Enoch Jones's jug business for $6 per week and earns extra money dancing at a jazz cabaret. He becomes the dance partner of Junie Budd. They soon find romance while performing Apache dance routines. Sylvester also makes a success of his uncle's business by introducing modern business methods.

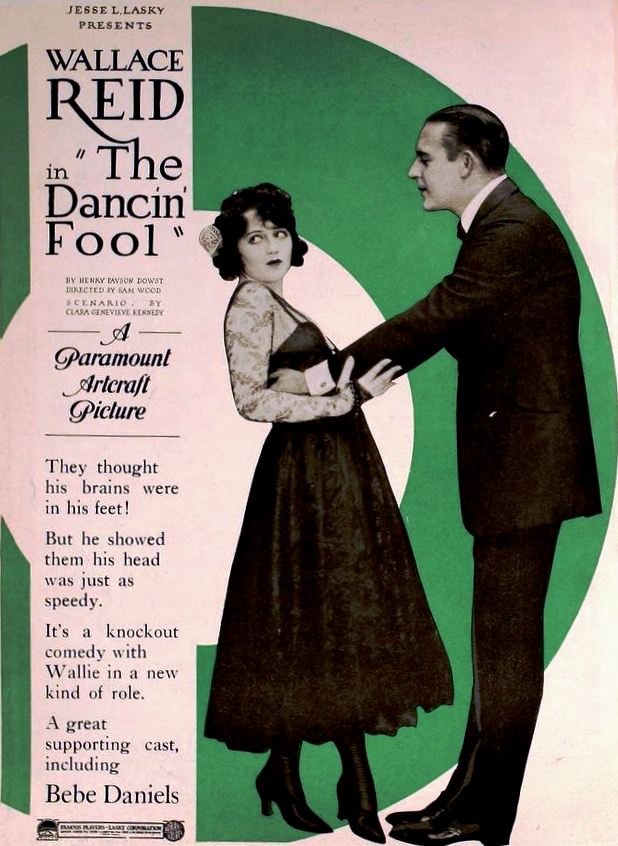
Ad for the film

== Cast ==
- Wallace Reid as Sylvester Tibble
- Bebe Daniels as Junie Budd
- Raymond Hatton as Enoch Jones
- Willis Marks as Tim Meeks
- George B. Williams as McGammon
- Lillian Leighton as Ma Budd
- Carlos San Martin as Elkus
- William H. Brown as Gabby Gaines
- Tully Marshall as Charle Harkins
- Ruth Ashby as Dorothy Harkins
- Ernest Joy as Tom Reed

== See also ==
- Wallace Reid filmography
