= The Fair Barbarian =

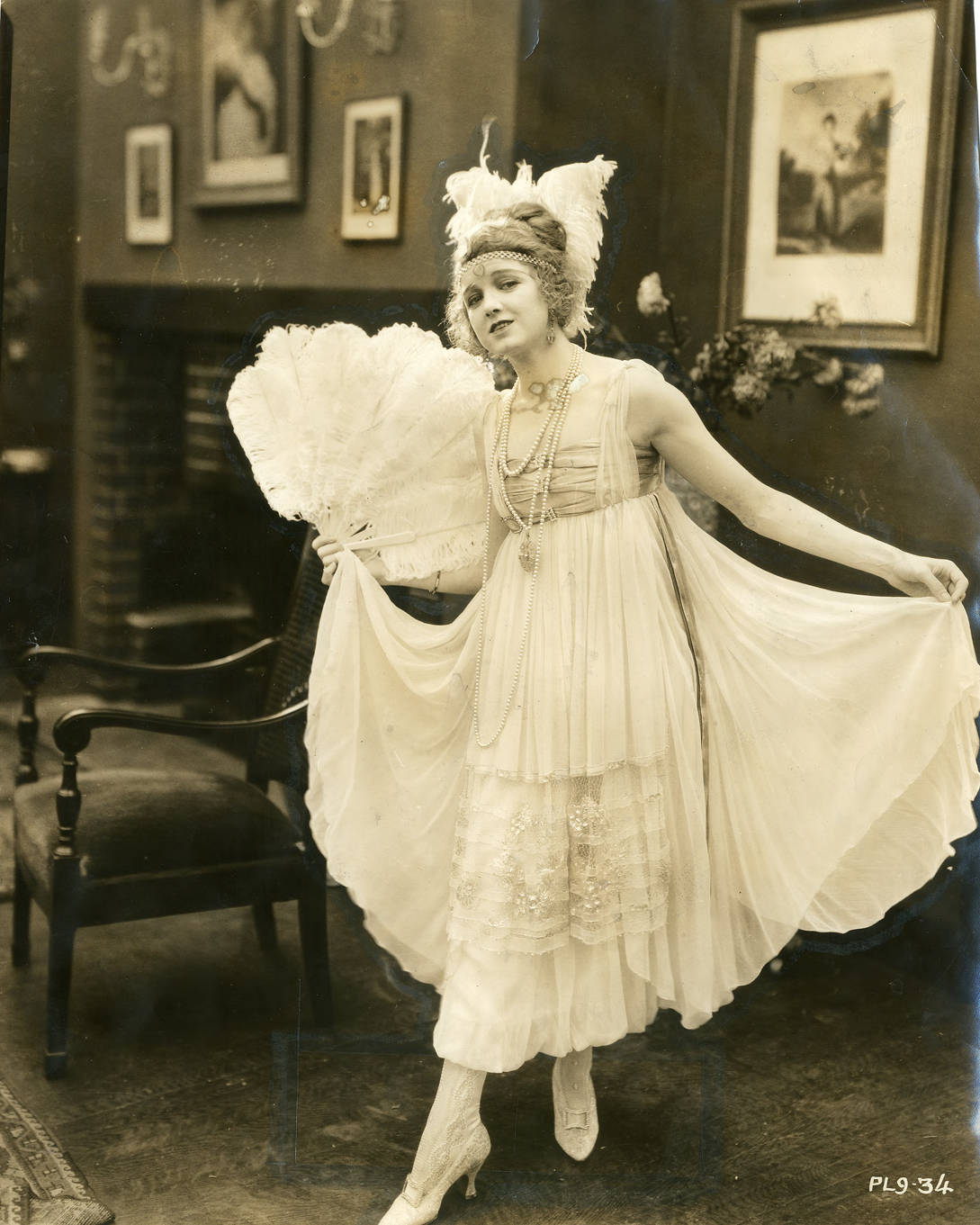
- Still with Martin
- Directed by: Robert Thornby
- Screenplay by: Edith M. Kennedy
- Based on: A Fair Barbarian by Frances Hodgson Burnett
- Produced by: Jesse L. Lasky
- Starring: Vivian Martin; Clarence Geldart; Douglas MacLean; Jane Wolfe; Josephine Crowell; Mae Busch
- Cinematography: James Van Trees
- Production company: Pallas Pictures
- Distributed by: Paramount Pictures
- Release date: December 17, 1917
- Running time: 50 minutes
- Country: United States
- Language: Silent (English intertitles)

The Fair Barbarian is a 1917 American silent comedy film directed by Robert Thornby and written by Edith M. Kennedy, based on an 1881 novel by Frances Hodgson Burnett. The film stars Vivian Martin, Clarence Geldart, Douglas MacLean, Jane Wolfe, Josephine Crowell, and Mae Busch. The film was released on December 17, 1917, by Paramount Pictures. It is not known whether the film currently survives.

== Plot ==
As described in a film magazine, Octavia Bassett of Bloody Gulch, after a breakup with her sweetheart, decides to visit her Aunt Belinda in Slowbridge. Her apparel and automobile shock the inhabitants of Slowbridge, and tongues are set wagging at the musicale of Lady Theobald. Octavia matches wits with Captain Barold. Lady Theobald is anxious for the captain to marry her niece Lucia. However, Lucia loves Mr. Burmistone, a "common" mill owner. Just as Octavia has decided that she will marry the captain, her father and Jack Belasys, her ex-fiancé, arrive in Slowbridge. The pleasure of seeing Jack and the knowledge that she can return to Bloody Gulch reunite Jack and Octavia.

== Cast ==
- Vivian Martin as Octavia Bassett
- Clarence Geldart as Martin Bassett
- Douglas MacLean as Jack Belasys
- Jane Wolfe as Belinda Bassett
- Josephine Crowell as Lady Theobald
- Mae Busch as Lucia
- William Hutchinson as Reverend Poppleton
- Alfred Paget as Mr. Burmistone
- Ruth Handforth as Miss Chickie
- Elinor Hancock as Lady Barold
- Charles K. Gerrard as Captain Francis Barold
- Helen Jerome Eddy as Maid
- John Burton as Dugald Binnie
- Charles Ogle
