= The Hidden Spring =

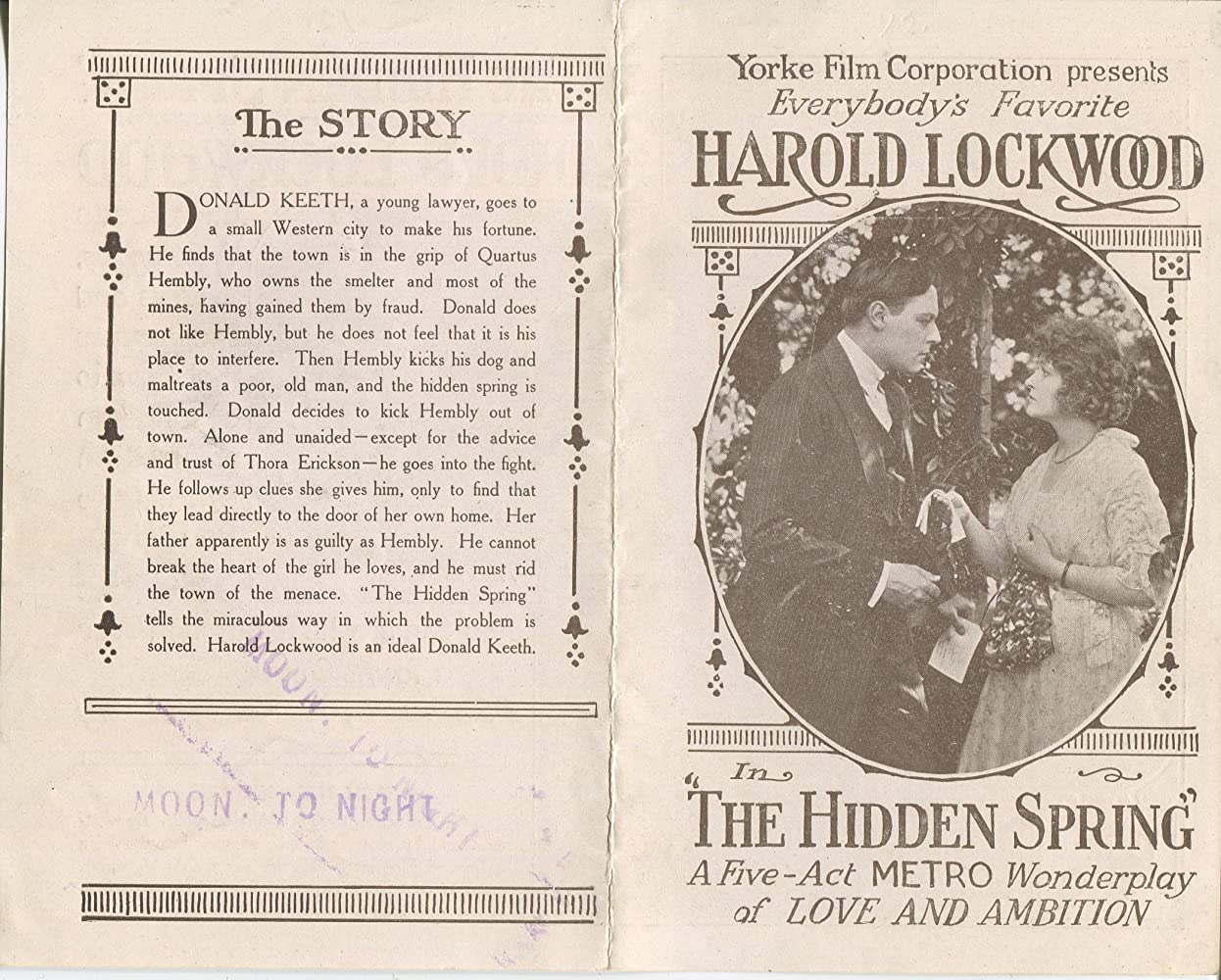
- Directed by: E. Mason Hopper
- Written by: Clarence Budington Kelland; Fred J. Balshofer; Richard V. Spencer
- Starring: Harold Lockwood; Vera Sisson; Herbert Standing
- Cinematography: Tony Gaudio
- Production company: Yorke Film Corporation
- Distributed by: Metro Pictures
- Release date: July 16, 1917
- Running time: 50 minutes
- Country: United States
- Languages: Silent; English intertitles

The Hidden Spring is a 1917 American silent adventure film directed by E. Mason Hopper and starring Harold Lockwood, Vera Sisson and Herbert Standing.

== Cast ==
- Harold Lockwood as Donald Keeth
- Vera Sisson as Thora Erickson
- Herbert Standing as Quartus Hembly
- Lester Cuneo as Bill Wheeler
- Doc Crane as Daniel Kerston
- Arthur Millett as Olaf Erickson
- Billie West as Undetermined Role
- Claire Anderson as Undetermined Role

== Preservation ==
With no holdings located in archives, The Hidden Spring is considered a lost film.

== Bibliography ==
- Robert B. Connelly. The Silents: Silent Feature Films, 1910-36, Volume 40, Issue 2. December Press, 1998.
