= The Fighting Lover =

1921 film

- Directed by: Fred LeRoy Granville
- Written by: Harvey Gates
- Based on: story Three in a Thousand by Ben Ames Williams
- Produced by: Carl Laemmle
- Starring: Frank Mayo; Elinor Hancock; Gertrude Olmstead
- Cinematography: Leland Lancaster
- Production company: Universal Pictures
- Distributed by: Universal Pictures
- Release date: June 13, 1921
- Running time: 50 minutes
- Country: United States
- Languages: Silent; English intertitles

The Fighting Lover is a 1921 American silent mystery comedy film directed by Fred LeRoy Granville and starring Frank Mayo, Elinor Hancock and Gertrude Olmstead.

== Cast ==
- Frank Mayo as Andrew Forsdale
- Elinor Hancock as Mrs. Lydia Graham
- Gertrude Olmstead as Jean Forsdale
- Jackson Read as Ned Randolph
- Colin Kenny as Vic Ragner
- Jacqueline Logan as Helen Leigh
- Joseph Singleton as Quig Munday
- Ruth Ashby as Anna Hughes
- Fred Becker as Dr. Munro
- Robert Bolder as Valet

== Bibliography ==
- Connelly, Robert B. The Silents: Silent Feature Films, 1910-36, Volume 40, Issue 2. December Press, 1998.
- Munden, Kenneth White. The American Film Institute Catalog of Motion Pictures Produced in the United States, Part 1. University of California Press, 1997.
