= Vera Sisson =

American actress

- Born: July 31, 1891; Salt Lake City, Utah Territory, U.S.
- Died: August 6, 1954 (aged 63); Carmel, California, U.S.
- Occupation: Actress
- Years active: 1913–1926
- Spouse: Richard Rosson (m. 1916; died 1953)

Vera Sisson (July 31, 1891 – August 6, 1954) was an American actress of the silent era.

== Biography ==
Vera Sisson was born on July 31, 1891, in Salt Lake City. She received her education at Brownlee Collegiate School for Girls in Denver, Colorado. In 1912, Sisson applied for work as an extra at Universal Pictures and made her film debut in The Helping Hand (1913). Sisson received recognition as J. Warren Kerrigan's leading lady in seven successful films, including The Sandhill Lovers (1914), The Oyster Dredger (1915), and A Bogus Bandit (1915).

In 1915, Sisson was offered a contract with Biograph Studios, and the following year she married actor and director Richard Rosson.

Sisson costarred with Harold Lockwood and Virginia Rappe in Paradise Garden (1917), Rudolph Valentino in The Married Virgin (1918), and Constance Talmadge in Experimental Marriage (1919). Her final film appearance was in Love 'Em and Leave 'Em (1926), starring Evelyn Brent and Louise Brooks.

On May 1, 1939, Sisson and her husband Rosson, along with two other British nationals, were arrested on a charge of espionage in Vienna, Austria by the Gestapo, allegedly for filming military hardware. They were held in solitary confinement for 34 days and released.

On May 31, 1953, Richard Rosson committed suicide by carbon monoxide poisoning. A year later, on August 6, 1954, Sisson committed suicide by barbiturate overdose. She is buried at Hollywood Forever Cemetery near her brother in law Arthur Rosson.

== Filmography ==
Year	Title	Role	Notes
1913	A Mix-Up in Pedigrees	The Stenographer	Short
1913	Always Together	The Old Bricklayer's Daughter	Short
1913	The House in the Tree	May – age 18	Short
1913	The Helping Hand	Ellen – age 19	Short
1913	How Freckles Won His Bride	Vera	Short, Unconfirmed
1913	Helen's Stratagem	Helen Rockwood – John's Sister	Short
1914	The Ten of Spades	Jess – the Waif	Short
1914	An Academy Romance	Vera	Short
1914	The Rival Dentists	Jane Payne	Short
1914	Some Boy		Short
1914	A Murderous Elopement	Mabel	Short
1914	Hawkeye and the Cheese Mystery	Pansy Buttermilk	Short
1914	Too Much Married	Tottie Coughdrop	Short
1914	The Seat of the Trouble	Edna	Short
1914	The Bolted Door	Natalie Judson	Short
1914	The Lion	Harriet Courtney	Short
1914	Women and Roses	Wallace's Wife	Short
1914	As Fate Willed	Marion Stearns	Short
1914	Toilers of the Sea	Jessie Scott	Short
1914	The Call Back	Emily Forbes	Short
1914	The Golden Ladder		Short
1914	The Sandhill Lovers	Meg, Hardy's Daughter	Short
1914	The Silent Witness	Vera	Short
1914	A Twentieth Century Pirate	Penelope Hampton	Short
1914	At Mexico's Mercy	Brenda	Short
1914	Value Received	Frances De Vere	Short
1914	Out of the Valley	Mrs. Osborne	Short
1914	A Man and His Brother	Eleanor Hess – the Farmer's Daughter	Short
1914	Weights and Measures	Kitty Donely	Short
1914	There Is a Destiny	Jeanne de Jean – the Fisherman's Daughter	Short
1914	The Man from Nowhere	Lolita – the Stranger's Sweetheart	Short
1914	Little Meg and I	Meg Anderson	Short
1914	A Gentleman from Kentucky	Nell Hastings	Short
1914	The Proof of a Man	Alma Wilson	Short
1914	Disillusioned	Velma Benning	Short
1914	His Father's Son	Mrs. Horton - Cal Jr.’s Mother	Short
1914	His Heart His Hand and His Sword	Princess Beatrix de Grandlieu	Short
1914	The Empire of Illusion	Princess Beatrix de Grandlieu	Short
1914	The Inn of the Winged Gods	Princess Beatrix de Grandlieu	Short
1915	A Bogus Bandit	The Drifter's Daughter	Short
1915	Martin Lowe, Financier		Short
1915	The Storm	Helen Cartwright	Short
1915	The Guardian of the Flock	Rosaria	Short
1915	The Stool Pigeon	Mildred Moore	Short
1915	For Cash	Vera Ronceval	Short
1915	The Oyster Dredger	Vera – an Heiress	Short
1915	Martin Lowe, Fixer	Helen Stebbins	Short
1915	The Trust	Florence Allison	Short
1915	According to Value	Mabel Stewart – Arthur's Sweetheart	Short
1915	The Chimney's Secret		Short, Uncredited
1915	The Rehearsal	Evelyn Payne	Short
1915	His Wife's Story	Louise Blair	Short
1915	The Worth of a Woman	Mrs. Holmes	Short
1915	His Hand and Seal		Short
1915	The Laurel of Tears	Esther Browne	Short
1915	The Chief Inspector	Lucille Palmer – George's Daughter	Short
1915	A Woman Without a Soul	Cora Martin	Short
1915	Her Stepchildren	Rose	Short
1915	The Tides of Retribution	Nellie Carpenter	Short
1916	The Avenging Shot		Short
1916	Stronger Than Woman's Will		Short
1916	The Iron Will	Henrietta	Short
1916	The Guilt of Stephen Eldridge	Eleanor Curzon	Short
1916	The Mystery of Orcival	Laurence	Short
1916	The Battle of Truth	Belle Bolter	Short
1916	The Man Who Called After Dark	Dorothy – Whitmore's Ward	Short
1916	The Larrimore Case	The Girl in the Case	Short
1916	Fit for Burning	Constance Grey	Short
1916	The Iron Woman	Elizabeth Ferguson	
1916	That Sharp Note		Short
1917	The Hidden Spring	Thora Erickson	
1917	Paradise Garden	Una Habberton	
1918	The Married Virgin	Mary McMillan	
1919	Experimental Marriage	Dot Harrington	
1919	The Veiled Adventure	Eve Gardiner	
1919	The Heart of Youth	Evie Atherton	
1919	His Official Fiancée	Cicely Harradine	
1920	The Marriage Blunder		
1921	The Avenging Arrow		Unconfirmed
1921	The Sage–Brush Musketeers		Short
1926	Love 'Em and Leave 'Em	Mrs. Whinfer	
