= A Kiss for Susie =

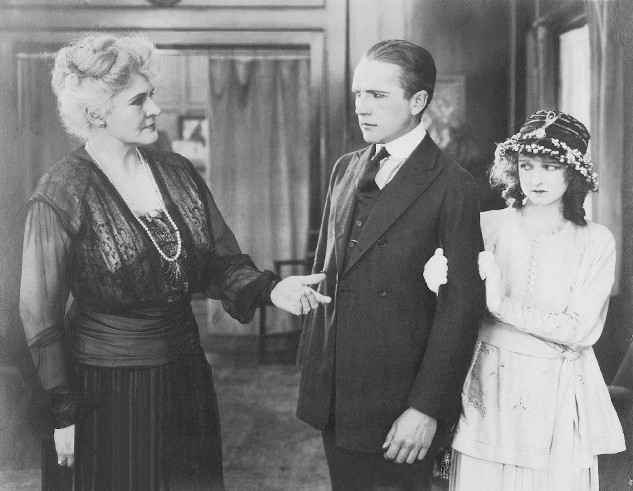
- Still with Elinor Hancock, Tom Forman, and Vivian Martin
- Directed by: Robert Thornby
- Screenplay by: Harvey F. Thew; Paul West
- Produced by: Julia Crawford Ivers
- Starring: Vivian Martin; Tom Forman; John Burton; Jack Nelson; Pauline Perry; Chris Lynton
- Cinematography: James Van Trees
- Production company: Pallas Pictures
- Distributed by: Paramount Pictures
- Release date: August 2, 1917
- Running time: 50 minutes
- Country: United States
- Language: Silent (English intertitles)

A Kiss for Susie is a lost 1917 American silent comedy film directed by Robert Thornby and written by Harvey F. Thew and Paul West. The film stars Vivian Martin, Tom Forman, John Burton, Jack Nelson, Pauline Perry, and Chris Lynton. The film was released on August 2, 1917, by Paramount Pictures.

== Plot ==
As described in a film magazine, while the male members of the family bring home money, Susie keeps house and tries to keep them filled with food. A wealthy uncle dies and leaves the bricklayer fifty thousand pounds of gold, so the Nolans move into better quarters and fall in with a cheap set. Susie sees the ruin that money is bringing her father, brother, and sister, and succeeds in convincing them to invest in a supposedly poor stock. The venture fails and they suppose themselves penniless until Susie's beau returns the money which he has invested in securities to take care of the family for life.

== Cast ==
- Vivian Martin as Susie Nolan
- Tom Forman as Phil Burnham
- John Burton as Peter Schwartz
- Jack Nelson as Jim Noolan Jr.
- Pauline Perry as Lizzie Nolan
- Chris Lynton as Jim Nolan Sr.
- Elinor Hancock as Mrs. Burnham
