= You're Fired =

1919 film by James Cruze

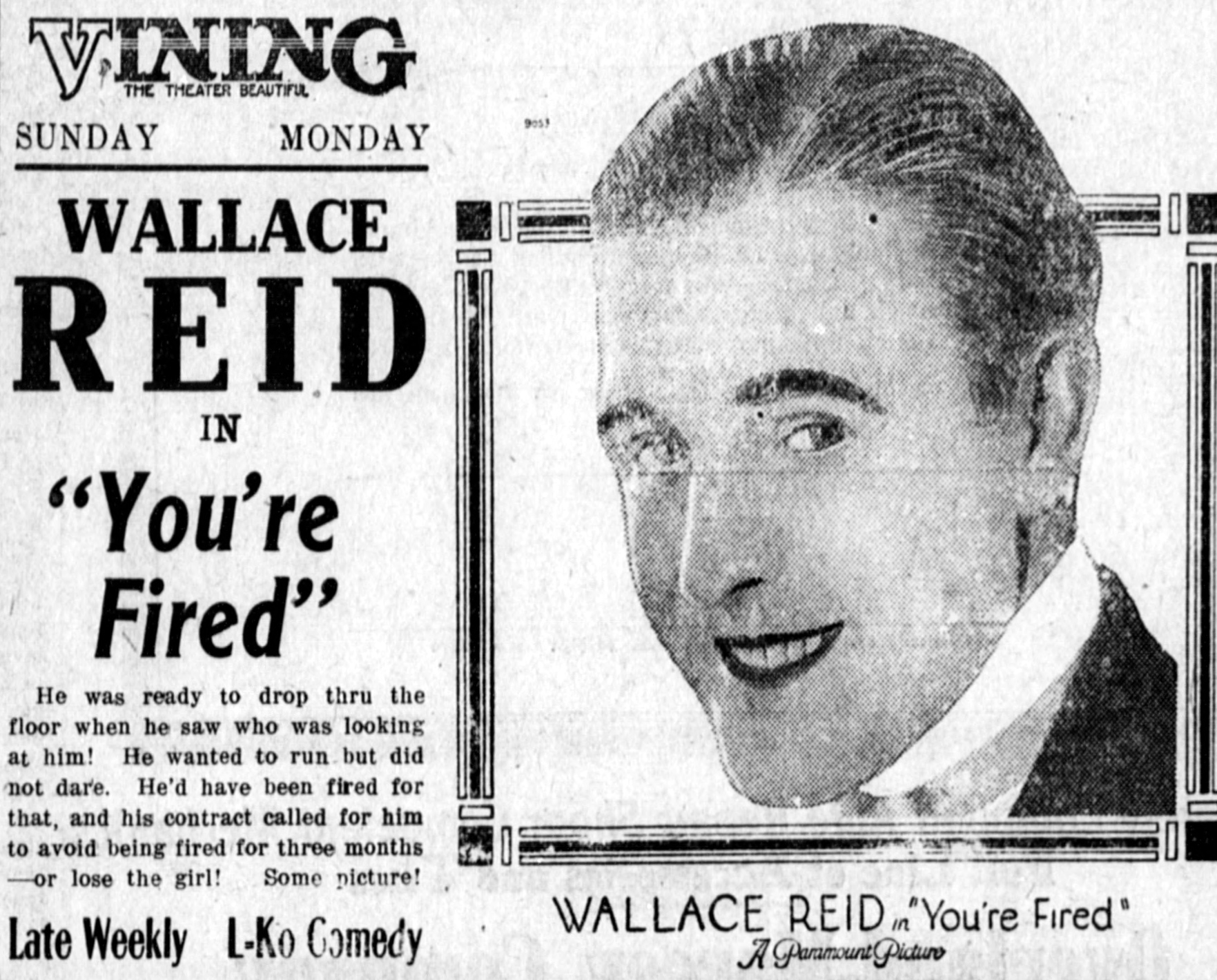
- Newspaper advertisement.
- Directed by: James Cruze
- Written by: Clara Genevieve Kennedy (scenario); Wilfred Buckland (intertitles)
- Based on: "The Halberdier of the Little Rheinschloss" by O. Henry
- Produced by: Adolph Zukor; Jesse L. Lasky
- Starring: Wallace Reid; Wanda Hawley
- Cinematography: Frank Urson
- Distributed by: Paramount Pictures
- Release date: June 8, 1919
- Running time: 5 reels (4,183 feet) (Approx. 50 minutes)
- Country: United States
- Language: Silent (English intertitles)

You're Fired is a 1919 American silent comedy film directed by James Cruze and starring Wallace Reid. The film was produced by Famous Players–Lasky and distributed by Paramount Pictures on June 8, 1919.

== Plot ==
As described in a film magazine, old Gordon Rogers believes in working 18-hour days while Billy, who is in love with Gordon's daughter Helen, does not believe in working at all. The hard-hearted father will accept Billy as a son-in-law on one condition: that he earn his own living for one month and if, during that time, he hears the fatal words "You're fired!" addressed to him, then Helen, sole heiress of the Rogers' millions in gold, can never be his. While this is a terrible test, Billy is game. His first job as a stenographer he resigns at the end of his first day to avoid being fired. Job number two is at a restaurant where he is required to wear the garb of an ancient warrior known to all readers of historical novels as a halberdier, and then pose as a statue on the landing of the stairs. To the restaurant comes fair Helen, her father Gordon, and Tom, a young gentleman willing to do anything short of murder the sake of the young lady and her golden prospects. Old Gordon has arranged a merger of a stray railroad he owns with another company, and is fighting Tom's uncle, an unscrupulous financier who has promised his nephew a supply of ready cash if he can obtain the papers for the deal. Tom known that the papers are in a safe at the Old Rogers' home, and hires two experts to open the safe and get the papers. All of these people are meeting at the restaurant. Helen catches sight of Billy in his ancient garb and recognizes him. She tries to find out why he is so dressed, but Bill is sworn to secrecy and dare not tell her. To show her anger she insists that he wait on her party, and is almost fired when he spills soup on her gown. Previously Billy had worked as a xylophone player at a dance where Helen was a guest, and hid behind a false mustache. Her great anger when he would not do as she demanded shows her true love for him. Billy manages to stick out the thirty days without being fired and also obtains the merger papers stolen from the safe, and returns them to Gordon, who hands over his daughter at once.

== Preservation status ==
You're Fired was considered to be a lost film for decades until a copy was repatriated from the Gosfilmofond film archive in Russia to the United States in 2010.

== Cast ==
- Wallace Reid - Billy Deering Jr.
- Wanda Hawley - Helen Rogers
- Henry Woodward - Tom
- Theodore Roberts - Gordon Rogers
- Lillian Mason - Mrs. Oglethorpe
- Herbert Pryor - Horace Graham
- Raymond Hatton - orchestra leader
- William Lesta - restaurant proprietor

== See also ==
- List of rediscovered films
- Wallace Reid filmography
