= An Innocent Adventuress =

1919 film by Robert G. Vignola

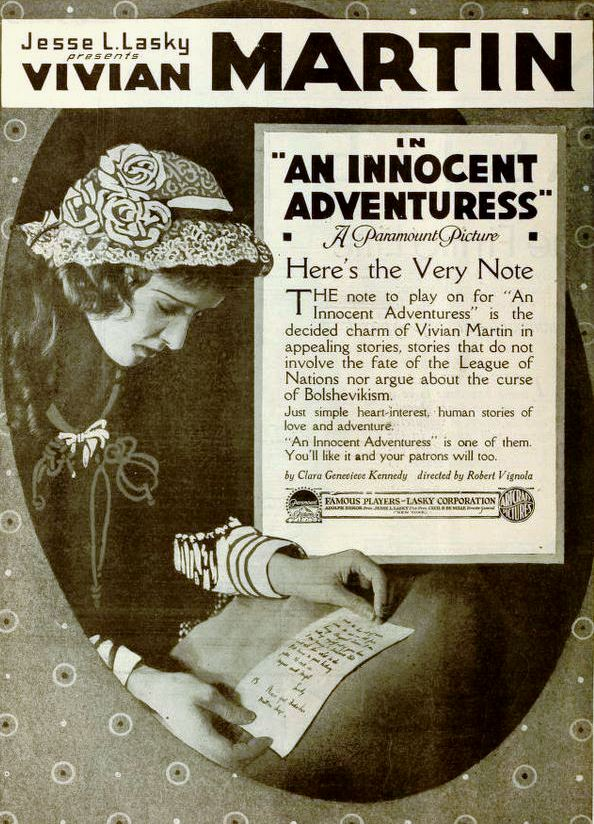
- Ad for film
- Directed by: Robert G. Vignola
- Screenplay by: Clara Genevieve Kennedy
- Produced by: Jesse L. Lasky
- Starring: Vivian Martin; Lloyd Hughes; Edythe Chapman; Gertrude Norman; Jane Wolfe; Tom Bates
- Cinematography: Frank E. Garbutt
- Production company: Famous Players–Lasky Corporation
- Distributed by: Paramount Pictures
- Release date: June 8, 1919
- Running time: 50 minutes
- Country: United States
- Language: Silent (English intertitles)

An Innocent Adventuress is a lost 1919 American silent comedy film directed by Robert G. Vignola and written by Clara Genevieve Kennedy. The film stars Vivian Martin, Lloyd Hughes, Edythe Chapman, Gertrude Norman, Jane Wolfe, and Tom Bates. The film was released on June 8, 1919, by Paramount Pictures.

== Plot ==
As described in a film magazine, because her wealthy aunt and guardian Heppy is about to evict a poor family that lives on the estate, Lindy destroys the letter which she believes demands that they vacate the premises. A robbery is committed in the neighborhood and Dick Ross, a reformed crook who has been in Aunt Heppy's services, believes Lindy is in league with the crooks. Lindy thinks that he knows of her fancied crime and half confesses to him. To shield her he is about to confess to the crime when the tramp who is guilty and who had been fed and clothed by the generous Lindy clears up the mystery concerning the robbery. Lindy then tells him of the letter, and he informs her that it was not so important a document as she had imagined, and that she is not in danger of arrest. They then plight their troth.

== Cast ==
- Vivian Martin as Lindy
- Lloyd Hughes as Dick Ross
- Edythe Chapman as Aunt Heppy
- Gertrude Norman as Mrs. Cribbley
- Jane Wolfe as Mrs. Bates
- Tom Bates as Chilowee Bill
- Hal Clements as Doc Brogan
- Jim Farley as Brogan's Accomplice
- Spottiswoode Aitken as Meekton
