= His Official Fiancée =

1919 film by Robert G. Vignola

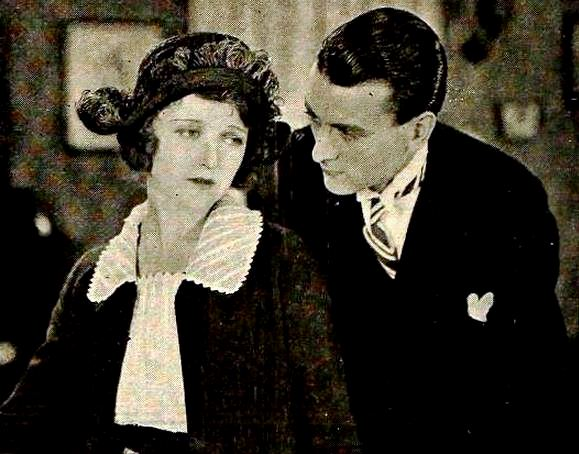
- Vivian Martin and Hugh Huntley
- Directed by: Robert G. Vignola
- Screenplay by: Edith Kennedy; Berta Ruck
- Produced by: Jesse L. Lasky
- Starring: Vivian Martin; Forrest Stanley; Vera Sisson; Hugh Huntley; Mollie McConnell; Kathryn Sohn; Tom Ricketts
- Cinematography: James Van Trees
- Production company: Famous Players–Lasky Corporation
- Distributed by: Paramount Pictures
- Release date: October 16, 1919
- Running time: 50 minutes
- Country: United States
- Language: Silent (English intertitles)

His Official Fiancée is a lost 1919 American silent comedy film directed by Robert G. Vignola and written by Edith M. Kennedy and adapted from the Berta Ruck novel His Official Fiancée. The film stars Vivian Martin, Forrest Stanley, Vera Sisson, Hugh Huntley, Mollie McConnell, Kathryn Sohn and Tom Ricketts. The film was released on October 16, 1919, by Paramount Pictures.

== Cast ==
- Vivian Martin as Monica Trant
- Forrest Stanley as William 'Still' Waters
- Vera Sisson as Cicely Harradine
- Hugh Huntley as Sydney Vandeleur
- Mollie McConnell as Mrs. Waters
- Kathryn Sohn as Theo Waters
- Tom Ricketts as Major Montressor
- Robert Bolder as Uncle Albert Waters
- James Neill as Mr. Dundonald
- Katherine Van Buren as Odette Charrier
- Virginia Foltz as Miss Robinson
