= Berta Ruck =

Welsh novelist in English (1878–1978)

- Portrait of Berta Ruck by Walter Stoneman, circa 1916
- Born: Amy Roberta Ruck; 2 August 1878; Murree, Punjab, British India (now Punjab, Pakistan)
- Died: 11 August 1978 (aged 100); Aberdyfi, Wales
- Occupation: Novelist
- Spouse: (George) Oliver Onions
- Children: 2
- Writing career
- Language: English
- Period: 1905–1972
- Genre: Romance

Amy Roberta (Berta) Ruck (2 August 1878 – 11 August 1978) was a prolific Welsh writer of over 90 romance novels from 1905 to 1972. She also wrote short stories, an autobiography and two books of memoirs. Her married name was Mrs Oliver Onions from 1909 until 1918, when her husband changed his name and she became Amy Oliver.

== Early life ==
Born Amy Roberta Ruck on 2 August 1878 in Murree, Punjab, British India. She was one of the eight children of Eleanor D'Arcy and Colonel Arthur Ashley Ruck, a British army officer. The family moved to Wales, where Ruck was educated at St Winifred's School, Bangor. She then attended the Slade School of Fine Art to study art, winning a scholarship, and finally the Académie Colarossi in Paris.

Bernard Darwin, the golf writer and grandchild of Charles Darwin, was her cousin.

== Personal life ==
In 1909, Ruck married a fellow novelist, (George) Oliver Onions (1873–1961). They had two sons: Arthur (born 1912) and William (born 1913). Her husband legally changed his name to George Oliver in 1918, but continued to publish under the name Oliver Onions.

In 1939 Berta and her husband left London and settled in Aberdyfi.

Berta Ruck was widowed in 1961. An interview of Ruck by the BBC was included as part of "Yesterday's Witness: Two Victorian Girls," originally broadcast on 8 June 1970.

She died in Aberdyfi on 11 August 1978, nine days after her 100th birthday.

Many of Ruck's letters and manuscripts are archived in the National Library of Wales.

== Writing career ==
Berta Ruck began to contribute short stories and serials to magazines from 1905. She published her first novel, His Official Fiancée, in 1914, which was the subject of two films: His Official Fiancée (1919, silent film directed by Robert G. Vignola) and Hans officiella fästmö (1944, Swedish film directed by Nils Jerring).

== Partial bibliography ==
=== Novels ===
- His Official Fiancée (1914, filmed twice)
- The Wooing of Rosamund Fayre (1914)
- Miss Million's Maid (copyright 1915, published 1917)
- The Boy with Wings (1915, also The Lad with Wings)
- Khaki and Kisses (1915)
- In Another Girl's Shoes (1916)
- The Bridge of Kisses (1917)
- The Girls at his Billet (1917)
- The Three of Hearts (1917)
- The Girl who Proposed (1918)
- The Girl who Was Too Good Looking (c. 1918, listed in a copy of Arabella the Awful)
- The Years for Rachel (1918)
- The Dream Domesticated (1918)
- Rufus on the Rebound (1918)
- A Land-Girl's Love Story (1919)
- Sweethearts Unmet (1919, also The Great Unmet)
- The Disturbing Charm (1919)
- Spring Comes (1919, also Spring Comes for Miss Lonelyheart)
- American Snap-Shots (1920)
- Arabella the Awful (c. 1920)
- Sweet Stranger (1921)
- In Another Girl's Shoes (c. 1922)
- The Wrong Mr. Right (c. 1922)
- The Subconscious Courtship (1922)
- Sir or Madame? (1923)
- The Dancing Star (1923)
- Lucky in Love (1924)
- The Leap Year Girl (1924)
- Kneel to the Prettiest (1925)
- The Immortal Girl (1925)
- The Clouded Pearl (1925)
- The Pearl Thief (1926)
- Kneel to the Prettiest (1926))
- Her Pirate Partner (1927)
- The Mind of a Minx (1927)
- Money for One (1928)
- The Youngest Venus (1928)
- One of the Chorus (1929)
- The Unkissed Bride (1929)
- Joy-Ride! (1929)
- The Love-Hater (1930)
- To-Day's Daughter (1930)
- Missing Girl (1931)
- Forced Landing (1931)
- Dance-Partner (1931)
- Offer of Marriage (1932)
- This Year Next Year Sometime (1932)
- The Lap of Luxury (1932)
- Change Here for Happiness (1933)
- Sudden Sweetheart (1933)
- Understudy (1933)
- Eleventh Hour Lover (1933)
- The Best Time Ever (1934)
- Sunburst (1934)
- A Star in Love (1935)
- Sunshine Stealer (1935)
- Half-Past Kissing Time (1936)
- Sleeping Beauty (1936)
- Spring Comes (1936)
- Romance Royal (1937)
- Love on Second Thoughts (1937)
- Love Comes Again Later (1938)
- Wedding March (1938)
- Mock Honeymoon (1939)
- Arabella Arrives (1939)
- Handmaid to Fame (1939)
- Money Isn't Everything (1940)
- He Learned About Women (1940)
- It Was Left to Peter (1941)
- Fiancees are Relatives (1941)
- Waltz Contest (1941)
- Jade Earrings (1941)
- Footlight Fever (1942)
- Spinster's Progress (1942)
- Quarrel and Kiss (1942)
- Bread and Grease Paint (1943)
- Intruder Marriage (1944)
- Shining Chance (1944)
- You Are The One (1945)
- Throw Away Yesterday (1946)
- Surprise Engagement (1947)
- Tomboy in Lace (1947)
- She Danced in the Ballet (1948)
- Gentle Tyrant (1949)
- Joyful Journey (1950, also Hopeful Journey)
- The Rising of the Lark (1951)
- Spice of Life (1952)
- Fantastic Holiday (1953)
- Marriage is a Blind Date (1953, also Blind Date)
- The Men in her Life (1954)
- Romance in Two Keys (1955)
- We All Have Our Secrets (1955)
- A Wish a Day (1956)
- Romance of a Film Star (1956)
- Leap Year Love (1957)
- Admirer Unknown (1957, also Mystery Boy-Friend)
- Third Time Lucky (1958)
- A Smile from the Past (1959)
- Romantic Afterthought (1959)
- Love and a Rich Girl (1960)
- Sherry and Ghosts (1961)
- Diamond Engagement Ring (1962)
- Runaway Lovers (1963)
- Rendezvous at Zagarella (1964)
- Shopping for a Husband (1967)
- An Asset to Wales (1970)

=== Short story ===
- "The Picturesque Young Packards" (The Jabberwock, January 1906)

=== Non-fiction ===
- A Story-Teller Tells the Truth (1935)
- ’’A Smile for the Past’’ (Autobiography)’’
- A Trickle of Welsh Blood (an autobiography) (1967)
- ’’An Asset to Wales’’(1970)
- Ancestral Voices (1972)
