= Edith Kennedy =

American writer and screenwriter

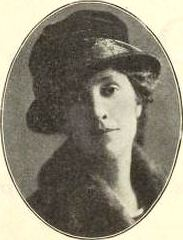
- Born: Edith May Kennedy; April 19, 1880; Auburn, New York, USA
- Died: November 8, 1963; Los Angeles, California, USA
- Occupation: Screenwriter
- Years active: 1917–1924
- Spouse: Albert D. Jewett (div.)
- Relatives: Clara Genevieve Kennedy (sister)

Edith Kennedy (1880-1963), often credited as Edith M. Kennedy, was an American writer and screenwriter active during the silent era.

== Biography ==
=== Beginnings ===
Edith May Kennedy was born in to Frederick Kennedy and Clara Lane in Auburn, New York. The family moved several times during Edith's childhood, eventually heading west and settling in Pasadena, California, where Edith began her career as a writer.

=== Career ===
Edith wrote short stories before turning her attentions to Hollywood. After moving to Pasadena in 1915, she began writing film scenarios and found her work in high demand. She penned dozens of scripts between 1917 and 1924 at Lasky Studios, working with directors like George Melford and Walter Edwards and often writing for Constance Talmadge.

=== Personal life ===
She married New York–based composer Albert D. Jewett in 1921, and from there, went under contract at MGM. The pair later divorced.

Her sister Clara Genevieve Kennedy also worked briefly as a scenario writer, penning eight scripts between 1918 and 1921.

Edith died on November 8, 1963, in Pasadena.

== Filmography ==
- Pal o' Mine (1924)
- Youth to Youth (1922)
- Seeing's Believing (1922)
- Glass Houses (1922)
- Fourteenth Lover (1922)
- Don't Call Me Little Girl (1921)
- Her First Elopement (1920)
- Oh, Lady, Lady (1920)
- Food for Scandal (1920)
- Crooked Streets (1920)
- The Ladder of Lies (1920)
- Young Mrs. Winthrop (1920)
- All of a Sudden Peggy (1920)
- His Official Fiancée (1919)
- The Third Kiss (1919)
- The Home Town Girl (1919)
- Rustling a Bride (1919)
- Romance and Arabella (1919)
- Jane Goes a' Wooing (1919)
- The Way of a Man with a Maid (1918)
- Mirandy Smiles (1918)
- Mrs. Leffingwell's Boots (1918)
- Her Country First (1918)
- The Cruise of the Make-Believes (1918)
- A Pair of Silk Stockings (1918)
- Sandy (1918)
- The Bravest Ways (1918)
- The Fair Barbarian (1917)
- Molly Entangled (1917)
- Bond of Fear (1917)
- Giving Becky a Chance (1917)
- The Marcellini Millions (1917)
