= Paradise Garden (film) =

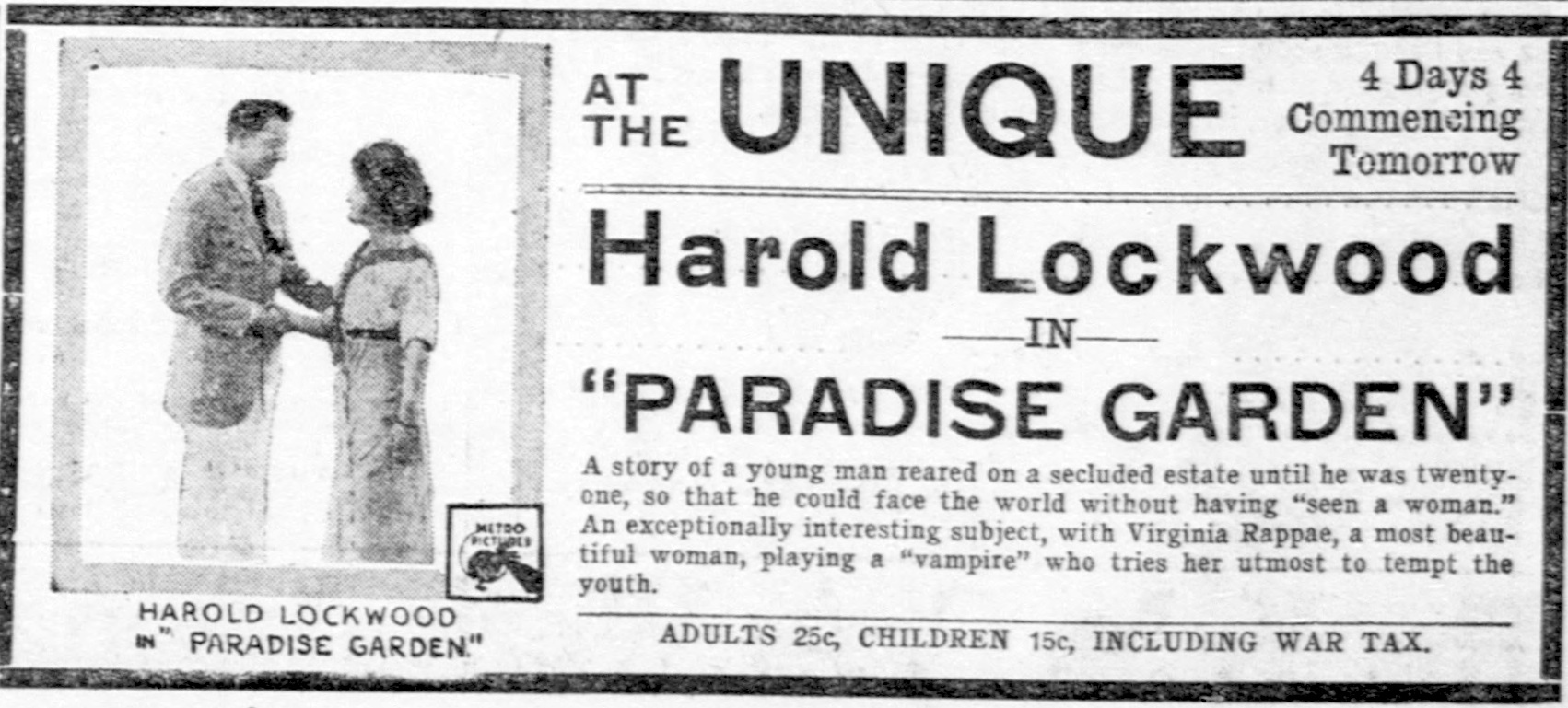
- Newspaper advertisement.
- Directed by: Fred J. Balshofer
- Written by: Fred Balshofer (scenario)
- Based on: Paradise Garden by George Gibbs
- Starring: Harold Lockwood; Vera Sisson; Virginia Rappe
- Cinematography: Tony Gaudio
- Production company: Yorke Film Corporation
- Distributed by: Metro Pictures
- Release date: October 1, 1917
- Running time: 6 reels
- Country: United States
- Language: Silent (English intertitles)

Paradise Garden is a 1917 American silent comedy romance film starring Harold Lockwood and directed by Fred J. Balshofer. The film is based on a novel, Paradise Garden, by George Gibbs and has a feature role for Virginia Rappe, who would soon be more famous for her death under mysterious circumstances that were sensationalized by the media. Metro Pictures distributed the film.

== Cast ==
- Harold Lockwood as Jerry Benham
- Vera Sisson as Una Habberton
- Virginia Rappe as Marcia Van Wyck
- William Clifford as Roger Canby
- Lester Cuneo as Jack Ballard
- G. Sprotte as Henry Ballard
- Catherine Henry as Miss Gore
- George Hupp as Jerry Benham, as child (credited as Little George Hupp)
- Olive Bruce (undetermined role)
- Harry DeRoy (undetermined role)

== Reception ==
Like many American films of the time, Paradise Garden was subject to cuts by city and state film censorship boards. The Chicago Board of Censors required cuts of two scenes of a couple standing before a nude painting in background and of the closeup of the girl's back after her gown was torn from her shoulder.

== Preservation ==
It is unknown whether the film survives as no copies have been located. It is likely the film is lost.
