= The Song of the Soul (1920 film) =

1920 American silent film by John W. Noble

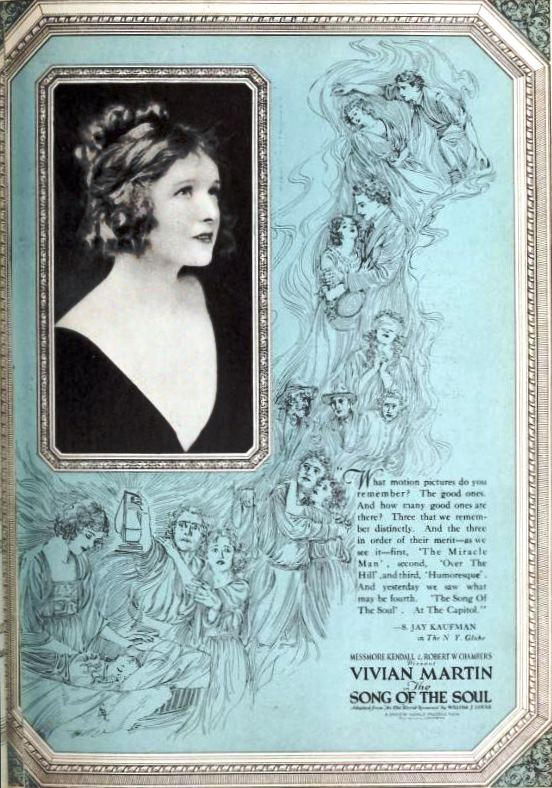
- Directed by: John W. Noble
- Written by: John W. Noble
- Based on: "An Old World Episode" by William J. Locke
- Produced by: Messmore Kendall; Robert W. Chambers
- Starring: Vivian Martin
- Cinematography: John Stumar
- Distributed by: Goldwyn Pictures
- Release date: October 1920
- Running time: 5 reels
- Country: USA
- Language: Silent..English titles

The Song of the Soul is a 1920 silent film drama directed by John W. Noble and starring Vivian Martin. It was produced by Messmore Kendall and Robert W. Chambers. Goldwyn Pictures distributed the film.

The films is preserved in the Cinematheque Royale de Belgique, Brussels.

== Cast ==
- Vivian Martin - Barbara Seaforth
- Fritz Leiber - Jerry Wendover
- Charles E. Graham - Grooze
- Ricca Allen - Jinny
