= Universal Studios =

Universal Studios may refer to:

- Universal Pictures, an American film studio
  - Universal Studios Lot, a film and television studio complex in Universal City, California
  - Universal Filmed Entertainment Group, its parent company
- Various theme parks operated by Universal Destinations & Experiences:
  - Universal Studios Hollywood, in Universal City, California
  - Universal Studios Florida, in Orlando, Florida
  - Universal Studios Japan, in Osaka, Japan
  - Universal Studios Singapore in Sentosa, Singapore
  - Universal Studios Beijing, in Beijing, China
  - Universal Studios Dubailand, in Dubai, United Arab Emirates
  - Universal Studios South Korea, in Hwaseong, South Korea
  - Universal Studios Great Britain, in Bedford, UK
- Universal International Studios, a television production company
