= Paradise Garden (novel) =

2023 novel by Elena Fischer

- Cover art
- Author: Elena Fischer
- Translator: Alexandra Roesch
- Cover artist: Laura Cronin
- Language: German
- Genre: Coming-of-age
- Published: 23 August 2023
- Publisher: Diogenes; The Indigo Press
- English publication date: 5 June 2025
- Media type: Print
- Pages: 352
- ISBN: 9783257072501

Paradise Garden is a 2023 coming-of-age novel by Elena Fischer. It follows 14-year-old Billie, who lives with her single mother Marika in a high-rise housing estate. After Marika dies in an accident, Billie travels in her mother's Nissan to search for the father she has never met. The novel was longlisted for the 2023 German Book Prize.

== Plot ==
Fourteen-year-old Billie lives with her mother, Marika, in a high-rise apartment complex on the outskirts of a German city. Marika, a single mother who emigrated from Hungary, works two jobs to make ends meet but struggles to provide for herself and her daughter. Despite their financial difficulties, Marika uses her creativity and optimism to bring joy into their lives.

Their lives are upended when Marika's mother, Billie's grandmother, arrives unexpectedly from Hungary, claiming to be ill and in need of medical treatment. The grandmother moves into their small apartment, causing tension and dredging up old conflicts between her and Marika. One day, an argument between the two women leads to an accident in which Marika dies.

Devastated by the loss of her mother, Billie is faced with the decision of either moving to Hungary with her grandmother or being placed in a youth home. Instead, she chooses to embark on a journey to find her father, whom she has never met and knows nothing about except for a torn photograph left behind by her mother.

Using her mother's old Nissan, which Marika had taught Billie to drive when she was twelve, Billie sets off on a road trip across Germany, heading towards the North Sea where she believes her father may be living. Eventually, Billie's journey leads her to a small island off the North Sea coast, where she discovers that her mother had lived with a man for three years after Billie's father abandoned them. The man welcomes Billie and offers her a place to stay, giving her a connection to her mother's past.

== Themes ==
Writing in Die Zeit, Benedikt Herber described the first half of the novel as a combination of a coming-of-age story and a social study of classism. Anne Amend-Söchting of literaturkritik.de noted the contrast between Billie's precarious circumstances and the affluent world of her friend Lea.

In an interview with taz, Fischer said that she used documentaries about precarious living and child poverty in Germany to develop Billie and Marika's living conditions. She said she invented the characters' ability to make their lives as pleasant as possible and to find something special in ordinary life.

Fischer has described the mother-daughter relationships as essential to the novel, referring both to Billie and Marika and to Marika and her mother. She said that both mothers are alone and must negotiate whose needs take priority.

Amend-Söchting identified writing as a resource for Billie: before Marika's death, Billie writes to counter bad moods; afterward, she records her experiences and feelings during the road trip.

== Background ==
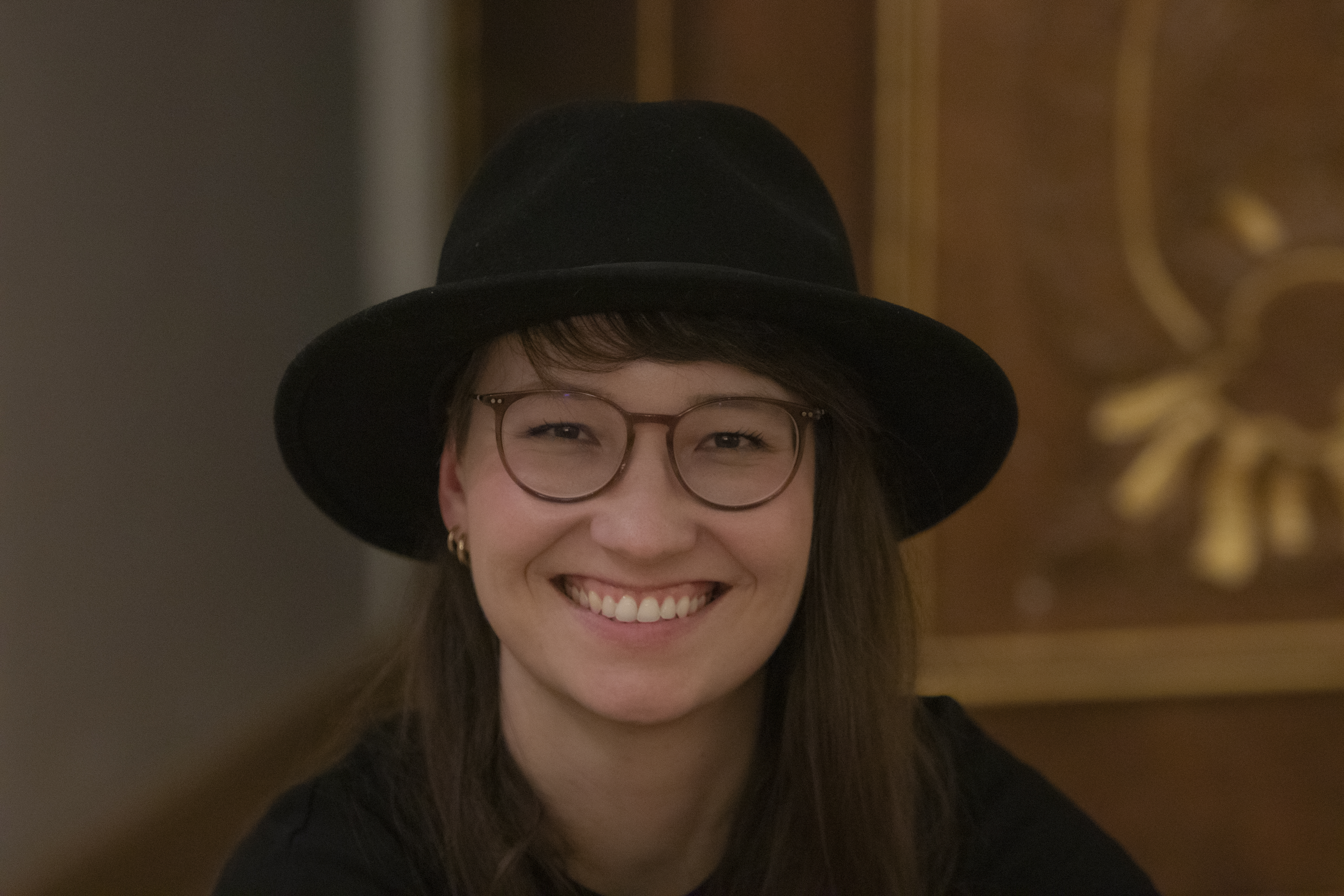
Elena Fischer in 2025 at a reading for Paradise Garden

Paradise Garden is Fischer's debut novel. Fischer said that the story began with an idea about the relationship between a father and a daughter, which developed into an absent father and Billie's search for him. This brought the mother and grandmother more prominently into the story.

Fischer also drew on her Hungarian family background. She said that both of her grandfathers were Hungarian Germans, and that one grew up near Budapest and lived in Hungary until early adulthood. Through him, she learned about Hungarian culture and customs, elements that she incorporated into the novel.

Fischer told taz that a high-rise estate in Mainz partly inspired the novel's setting, although she substantially fictionalized it. She said that documentaries about precarious living and child poverty in Germany informed her depiction of how Billie and Marika live.

== Publication ==
Diogenes published the German hardcover edition on 23 August 2023. It has 352 pages and the ISBN 978-3-257-07250-1. The Indigo Press published Alexandra Roesch's English translation on 5 June 2025.

== Reception ==
Tom Wohlfarth of Der Freitag wrote that Fischer often succeeded in approaching Billie's youthful perspective through quiet, simple sentences, but criticized the novel's occasional aphorisms, strained comparisons and what he regarded as an idealized view of poverty and grief. He compared the road-trip section with Wolfgang Herrndorf's Tschick, arguing that Fischer's tragic tone handled the road-novel form less easily.

Benedikt Herber of Die Zeit described the debut as both deeply sad and hopeful and praised its childlike but precise allegories, metaphors and aphorisms. He characterized the novel as a combination of coming-of-age story, social study and road novel.

Petra Pluwatsch of the Frankfurter Rundschau described Paradise Garden as a touching and convincing coming-of-age novel about growing up in difficult circumstances, grief, courage and hope.

Amend-Söchting praised Fischer's narrative competence and described Billie's narrative voice as energetic and profound.

== Awards ==
Paradise Garden was longlisted for the 2023 German Book Prize.
