= The Glimpses of the Moon =

The Glimpses of the Moon may refer to:

- The Glimpses of the Moon (Wharton novel), a 1922 novel by Edith Wharton
- The Glimpses of the Moon (film), a lost 1923 silent film based on Wharton's novel
- The Glimpses of the Moon (Crispin novel), a 1977 novel by Edmund Crispin
