= Sonny Chorre =

American actor and professional wrestler

Suni War Cloud
Personal information
- Born: Joseph Vance Chorre Jr. November 14, 1914 Los Angeles, California, U.S.
- Died: June 14, 1987 (aged 72) Los Angeles, California, U.S.
- Family: Gertrude Chorre (mother)

Professional wrestling career
- Ring name(s): Suni War Cloud; Chief Suni War Cloud; Chief War Cloud; Chief Crazy Horse; Sitting Bull; Steven Crazy Horse
- Billed height: 6 ft 2 in (1.88 m)
- Billed weight: 231 lb (105 kg)
- Trained by: Mike Mazurki
- Debut: 1947
- Retired: 1969

Joseph Vance "Sonny" Chorre Jr. (November 14, 1914 – June 14, 1987), better known by his ring name Suni War Cloud, was a professional wrestler and actor in the United States.

His mother was actress Gertrude Chorre, a Luiseño. He appeared in films with her. He attended Sherman Indian High School in Riverside. An athlete, he ran marathons.

His sister Marie Chorte also acted. Jim Thorpe managed him. Chorre performed a rain dance before wrestling bouts.

Many of his film roles were uncredited.

== Personal life ==
Chorre married his first wife, Scottish-born actress Lillian Douglas (1928–2023), in c. 1950 and settled in Buffalo, New York. They had two sons, Gary Stewart Chorre (b. 1951) and Ronald James Chorre (1952–2022), before divorcing in November 1954. He remarried in 1961 to Anna Bell Spears (1935–1989), a U.S. Army nurse during the Korean War, and remained together until his death.

== Filmography ==
Film appearances
Year	Title	Role	Notes	Ref.
1935	Wolf Riders	Young Bear	Uncredited	
1936	Rose Marie	Dancer in Totem Tom Tom	Uncredited	
1936	Ramona	Indian	Uncredited	
1936	Ride, Ranger, Ride	Comanche Warrior	Uncredited	
1936	The Plainsman	Indian #2 with Painted Horse	Uncredited	
1937	Ebb Tide	Attwater's Guard	Uncredited	
1938	Her Jungle Love	Guard	Uncredited	
1938	Flaming Frontiers	Indian	Uncredited	
1938	Hawk of the Wilderness	White Eagle	Uncredited	
1939	Union Pacific	Indian	Uncredited	
1939	Man of Conquest	Cherokee Tribesman	Uncredited	
1940	The Notorious Elinor Lee	Indian Prizefighter knocked out by Benny Blue	Uncredited	
1940	Buck Benny Rides Again	Indian	Uncredited; Also stunt performer	
1940	North West Mounted Police	Indian	Uncredited	
1940	Hudson's Bay	Indian	Uncredited	
1941	Western Union	Indian	Uncredited	
1942	Son of Fury: The Story of Benjamin Blake	Native	Uncredited; Also stunt performer	
1947	Joe Palooka in the Knockout	Cardona	Uncredited	
1948	The Dude Goes West	Indian Brave	Uncredited	
1948	The Paleface		Uncredited	
1949	Red Canyon	Indian	Uncredited	
1949	Joe Palooka in the Counterpunch	Angelo Cardona	Credited as Suni Chorre	
1950	The Traveling Saleswoman	Indian	Uncredited	
1951	Jim Thorpe - All-American	Wally Denny	Credited as Suni Warcloud	
1957	Hot Summer Night	Rosey	Uncredited	
1957	Tip on a Dead Jockey	Chauffeur	Uncredited	

== Championships and accomplishments ==
- Arizona Athletic Association
  - NWA Southwestern Tag Team Championship - with Jerry Woods
- Salt Lake Wrestling Club
  - NWA World Tag Team Championship (Idaho & Utah version) - with Chief Kit Fox
- Tri-State Sports
  - NWA Idaho Heavyweight Championship (1 time)
  - NWA Western Tag Team Championship (1 time) - with Rey Urbano
- World Wrestling Council
  - WWC Caribbean Heavyweight Championship (1 time)
