= Ola Humphrey =

American actress (1875–1948)

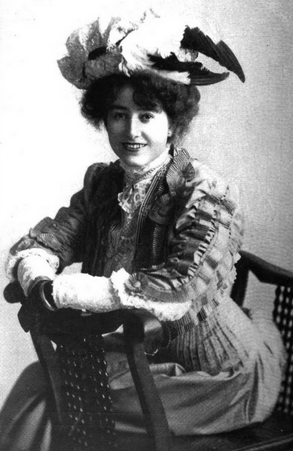
- Humphrey in 1906
- Born: Pearl Ola Jane Humphrey; July 16, 1875; Iowa, U.S.
- Died: 1948 (72/73); California, U.S.
- Occupation: Actress
- Years active: 1906–1919
- Spouses: Edwin Mordant (divorced); Prince Ibrahim Hassan (m. 1911; died 1918); John Henry Broadwood (m. 1920, died)
- Relatives: Orral Humphrey (brother)

Ola Humphrey (born Pearl Ola Jane Humphrey; July 16, 1875 – 1948) was an American actress on stage and in silent films.

== Early life ==
Ola Humphrey was born 16 July 1875 in Iowa as Pearl Ola Jane Humphrey and gave the impression that she'd been almost entirely brought up in Oakland, California, some sources even giving it as her place of birth. However, she was a teenager when the family moved to Oakland, probably in 1891. Ola gave her birth year as 1884, but census figures establish it as 1875. She graduated Class of 1893 from the Snell Seminary in Oakland, where she was celebrated for her ability at dramatic recitation, and in 1894 attended the Emerson School of Oratory in Boston, Massachusetts after this beginning her professional career. She was the daughter of Thomas Marshall Humphrey and Minnie J. Paschal Humphrey. Her father was a San Francisco furniture salesman. Her brother Orral Humphrey was an actor and film director.

== Career ==
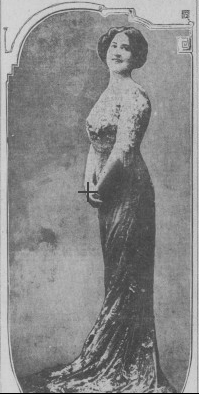
Ola Humphrey, from a 1911 newspaper.

Humphrey toured in stage companies in Australia, New Zealand, and Great Britain, in The Empress, The Prodigal Son (1906), The Little Gray Lady (1906), The Scarlet Pimpernel, The Second Mrs. Tanqueray, The Thief, and Another Woman's Window (1918), among others. She appeared in three silent films: Under the Crescent (1915, now lost; a highly fictionalized, serialized version of Humphrey's own story, written by Nell Shipman). The first of six two-reel chapters was entitled The Purple Iris. Other films were Missing (1918), and Coax Me (1919).

== Personal life ==
Ola Humphrey married three times. Her first husband was Edwin Mordant, a fellow actor; they divorced. While performing on the London stage, she caught the eye of Prince Ibrahim Hassan. Hassan was a cousin to Abbas II of Egypt. Their 1911 marriage in a London registrar's office was witnessed by American Vice-consul Richard Westacott (1849–1922) and the Count de Nevers. However, the marriage soon foundered, and they separated; the complicated matter of divorce was resolved when she was widowed in 1918 (though her legal troubles related to the marriage continued through at least 1923). She remarried to John Henry Broadwood, an English military officer, in 1920. Widowed again, she lived in Los Angeles in 1935, and donated Egyptian artifacts to the Los Angeles County Museum of Art. Late in life, she was living in an apartment in New York, her fortune lost or withheld by the Prince's relatives. Ola Humphrey died in California in 1948, aged about 73 years.
