= Mrs. Carter's Campaign =

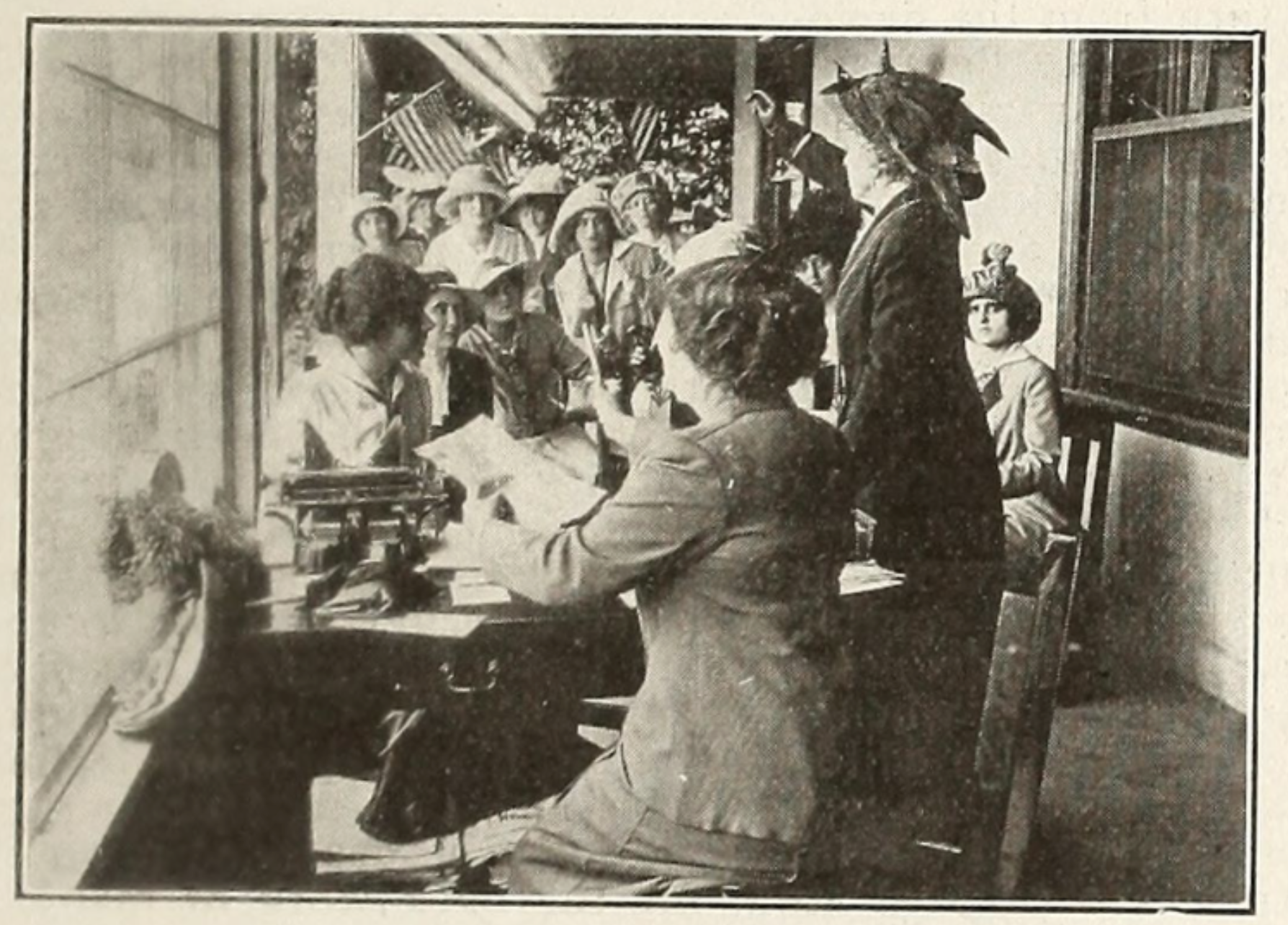
- Directed by: Tom Ricketts
- Written by: Al Giebler (story)
- Starring: Charlotte Burton
- Distributed by: Mutual Film
- Release date: September 25, 1913
- Country: United States
- Languages: Silent film English intertitles

Mrs. Carter's Campaign is a 1913 American silent short comedy film directed by Tom Ricketts starring Charlotte Burton.

== Plot ==
The following synopsis appeared in The Moving Picture News for September 13, 1913:

The question of suffragism has given rise to a number of rather perplexing situations. In the instance depicted in this picture the franchise to vote appeared to be fraught with no particular danger. And as long as the privilege seemed to satisfy the wild clamoring of the female contingent the price of peace was considered cheap. That popular opinion had miscalculated was soon made evident. The oratorical fireworks display of rival parties was immense, but the women would have lost were it not for a little harmless stunt they pulled and which changed the political map of Cartersville.

There is lots of action in this picture. It appears that the entire population of Santa Barbara participated. The photographic quality is excellent and as a whole the picture will meet with unqualified approval. It is anticipated to follow this production with a sequel, 'The Mayoralty Troubles of Mrs. Carter," release date to be announced later.

This synopsis was filed with the original copyright application at the Library of Congress:

A Woman's Clean City Club of Cartersville sends the Mayor a reminder of his promise to clean up the streets. Nell and Bessie Carter are chosen to carry the message.

The Mayor and the Chief of Police are deeply engrossed in a discussion of politics when the girls arrive. The Mayor refuses to do anything to the streets and denounces the Club as a lot of busybodies. The Chief of Police intercede in behalf of the club which gives rise to a quarrel, the Chief resigns and vows to get even.

The Club is so indignant at the treatment given their activities that they resolve to put a candidate in the field against the Mayor at the coming election. Mrs. Carter, the mother of Nell and Bessie, is named for the place.

She launches her campaign in glorious style and all looks promising when the mayor expresses a change of policy and enters into the campaign with such a zest as to cause his supporters to rally to his aid. The outlook for the election of Mrs. Carter is very bleak and dreary to all, including Mrs. Carter.

Not so the girls. They send their engagement rings to Tom and Dick, the two young men to whom they are engaged, and who are employed in the Mayor's office, with a letter saying that they will not wear them again until mother is elected Mayor.

The boys get busy, solicit votes, canvass, and spend money, but the opposition is too strong, and they are at their wits end, when the ex-chief of Police, anxious to be revenged on the Mayor, shows them how they can win.

Acting under his instructions, they offer to bet two dollars to one that Mrs. Carter will be elected. They have no trouble in placing bets with almost every voter on the other side.

Election day comes, and every man that made a bet finds his vote challenged and himself disfranchised for violation of the law against betting on elections. Mrs. Carter wins in a walk.
