= Sequel to the Diamond from the Sky =

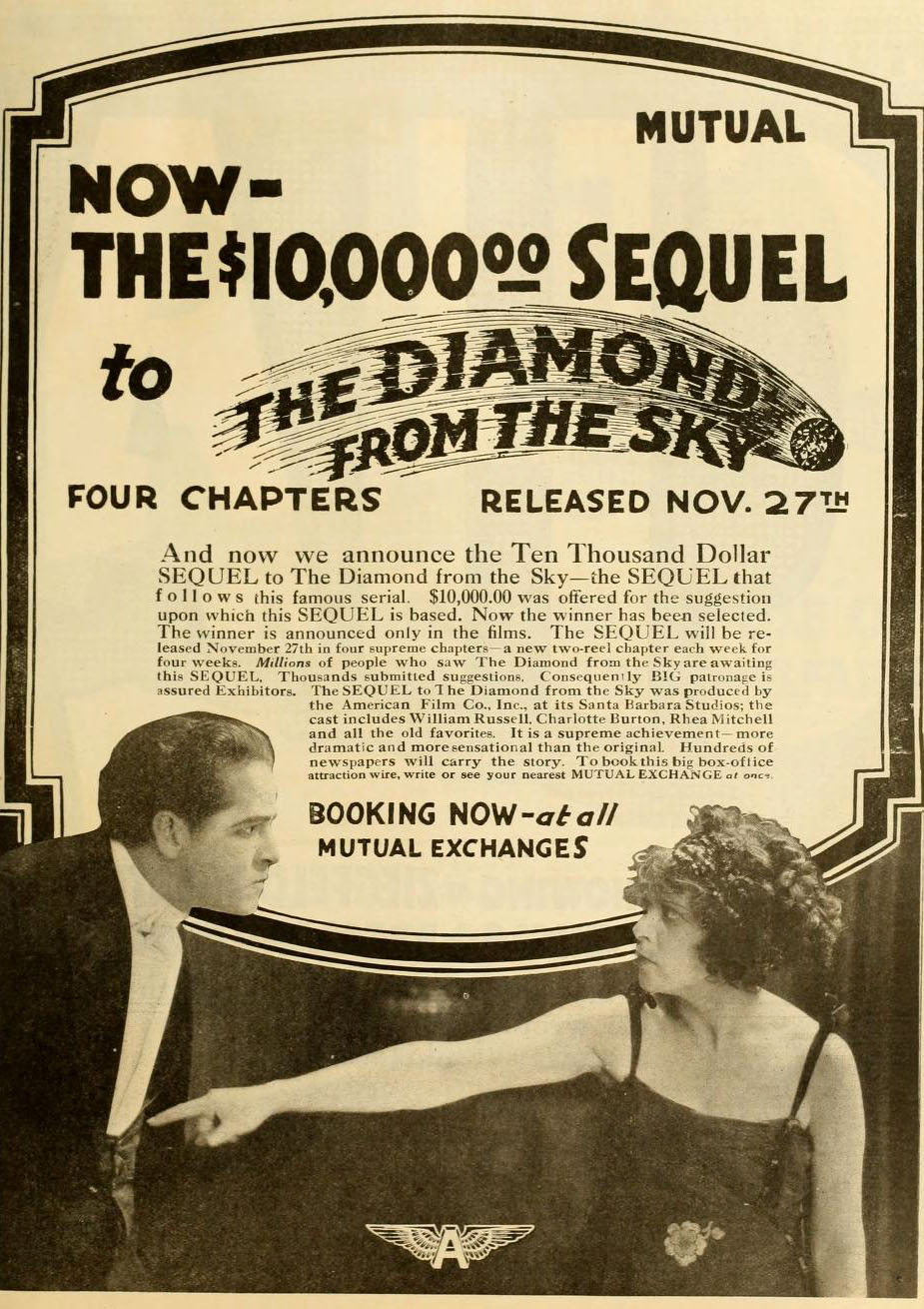
- Directed by: Edward Sloman
- Starring: William Russell; Rhea Mitchell
- Distributed by: Mutual Film
- Release date: November 27, 1916
- Country: United States
- Languages: Silent film English intertitles

Sequel to the Diamond from the Sky (also known as The Fate of the Child and The Gypsy's Trust) is a 1916 American silent film directed by Edward Sloman starring William Russell and Rhea Mitchell. The film is the sequel to the very popular The Diamond from the Sky. It is now considered to be lost.

== Cast ==
- William Russell as Arthur
- Dodo Newton as Little Arthur
- Rhea Mitchell as Esther Stanley
- Charlotte Burton
- William Tedmarsh
- Orrall Humphrey
- Vivian Marston
- Ward McAllister
- Blair Stanley
