= Pearl Sindelar =

American actress

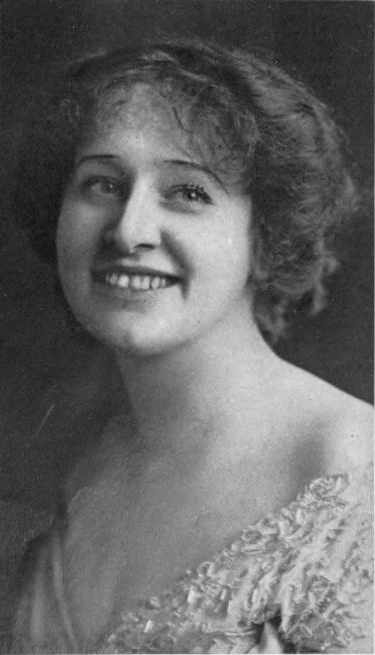
- Pearl Sindelar, from a 1911 publication.
- Born: Pearl Evelyn Tinker; February 5, 1881; Virginia City, Nevada
- Died: July 9, 1958 (aged 77); Glendale, California
- Occupation: Actress
- Spouse: Charles Sindelar

Pearl Evelyn Sindelar (née Tinker; February 5, 1881 – July 9, 1958) was an American silent film actress.

== Early life and education ==
Pearl Evelyn Tinker was from Virginia City, Nevada, the daughter of William Wallace Tinker and Mollie McCarty Tinker. Her father was a miner. Her mother, who used the stage name "Mae Evelynne", was the daughter of lawyer and adventurer John Templeton McCarty. Pearl Tinker was raised by her mother after her parents divorced in 1885. She briefly attended Snell Seminary in Oakland, California, but soon joined her mother on the vaudeville stage, at first in child roles, as "Pearl Evelynne".

== Career ==
Pearl Sindelar starred on stage in the musical The Girl in the Taxi (1910) before she started in silent films. She also appeared in Potash and Perlmutter (1914), and Hospitality (1922). She was active in union organizing in the New York theatre professions, and participated in the Actors' Equity strike of 1919. She also wrote an unpublished memoir of the strike.

After her stage and film career ended, Sindelar became interested in spirituality, especially the "I AM" movement of self-proclaimed prophet Guy Ballard and his wife, Edna Anne Wheeler Ballard. She and her husband joined Ballard's congregation in Los Angeles, and taught classes on "divine ascension" and other topics. She gave the eulogy at the funeral of film director Lois Weber.

When the church's activities were investigated, Pearl and Charles Sindelar were charged with mail fraud, along with other church leaders. They were acquitted in January 1941, and resigned their church positions soon after.

== Personal life ==
Pearl Tinker married actor and artist Charles Sindelar in 1902. She was widowed when Charles died in 1947. She died in Glendale, California in 1958.

== Filmography ==
- Cleopatra (1912)
- The Wrong Bottle (1913)*short
- Innocence (1913)*short
- The Italian Bride (1913)*short
- The Crooked Bankers (1913)*short
- Puttin' It Over on Papa (1913)*short
- The Governor's Double (1913)*short
- When a Woman Wastes (1913)*short
- The Turning Point (1913)*short
- The Depth of Hate (1913)*short
- Two Mothers (1913)*short
- A Scandinavian Scandal(1913)*short
- The Resurrection (1914)*short
- Broken Lives (1914)*short
- The Second Generation (1914)*short
- The Wasted Years (1914)*short
- A Leech of the Industry (1914)*short
- Detective Craig's Coup (1914)
- Jolts of Jealousy (1914)*short
- The Glimpses of the Moon (1923)
- Pied Piper Malone (1923)
- Peter Stuyvesant (1924)*short
- A Made-to-Order Hero (1927)*short
- The Four-Footed Ranger (1928)
