= William Tedmarsh =

American actor and comedian

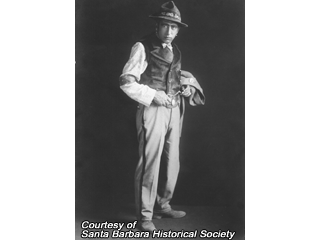
- Born: February 3, 1876; London
- Died: May 10, 1937 (aged 61)
- Occupation: Actor
- Years active: 1912-1916

William Tedmarsh (3 February 1876 - 10 May 1937) was an English-American early silent film actor.

Born in London, Tedmarsh moved to New York City as a child and began stage acting. He was signed into film in 1912 and starred in 34 films until 1916.

Tedmarsh starred in films such as A Blowout at Santa Banana in 1914 working with acclaimed actors such as Sydney Ayres and Charlotte Burton.

He died on May 10, 1937.

== Selected filmography ==
- The Twinkler (1916)
- Sequel to the Diamond from the Sky (1915)
- The Secret of the Submarine (1915)
- The Diamond from the Sky (1915)
- The Wily Chaperon (1915)
- The Cocoon and the Butterfly (1914)
- A Blowout at Santa Banana (1914)
- The Shriner's Daughter (1913)
