= Adelaide Smith =

American mathematician

Adelaide Smith (born 1870 in Boone, Iowa) was an American mathematician who studied with David Hilbert at the University of Göttingen, traveled to South Africa to teach at the only women's college south of the equator, and wrote two books about her experiences there. Her appointment as a mathematics instructor at the University of California, Berkeley was reported nationally. In later life she became the principal of a school for girls, the second oldest in California.

== Early life and education ==
Smith was born in 1870 in Boone, Iowa, the daughter of Allan Smith and his wife, Adelaide Nancy Butler. Her family moved to Chicago, and she studied at the Kirkland School in Chicago. As well as for her scholarship, she was also known as a talented piano player. After graduating from Wellesley College in 1893, where she completed the five-year course in music in only four years, she returned to Boone to become a high school teacher.

After a year in Boone, Smith spent the following summer studying mathematics at the University of Chicago. In 1894 she became a science teacher at the National Park Seminary in Maryland, while continuing to study mathematics through the Columbian University, now part of George Washington University. In 1897, Smith took a position as the chair for modern languages at Alma College in Michigan. By 1899, she was listed as "acting professor of mathematics" at the Rhode Island College of Agriculture and Mechanic Arts.

== International travel ==
In 1899, funded by the Women's Education Association and an Association of Collegiate Alumnae European Fellowship, Smith traveled to the University of Göttingen for advanced study in mathematics. She stayed in Göttingen for 2 1/2 years, and then moved to South Africa to teach at Huguenot College, at that time "the only institution for women south of the equator". While "teaching advanced mathematics" at Huguenot College, she earned a second bachelor's degree in 1905 at the University of the Cape of Good Hope.

She wrote about her travels in two books with a fellow American traveler, Jennie R. White: South Africa Today (1907) and A Little Journey to South Africa and Up the East Coast (1908), both published by the A. Flanagan Co.

== Later life in California ==
Returning to the US, Smith taught at San Rafael High School in California in 1908. She was named an instructor of mathematics at the University of California, Berkeley in 1909, an event that was reported nationally. She performed as a piano accompanist in a concert of opera music by Richard Wagner at the Hearst Greek Theatre in 1910, and completed a master's degree at the university in 1911. Her master's thesis concerned a differential equation suggested to her by David Hilbert during her stay in Göttingen. She also became a professor of mathematics at Mills College.

In 1913, she became head of the Snell Seminary in Berkeley after the death of its previous head, Edna Snell Poulson, renaming it as the Wellesley School for Girls. In an incident from this time recorded by Bruce Kodish, she sold her copy of Principia Mathematica to Alfred Korzybski, having "little use" for it herself. In 1934, she was described as "bedridden" from a broken hip but as a "well-known Berkeley educator" giving college preparatory lessons to the unemployed through the Civil Works Service, and she continued to be listed as the principal of the Wellesley School, "the second oldest private school in the state", as late as 1950.
