= Jim Thorpe – All-American =

1951 film by Michael Curtiz

- Directed by: Michael Curtiz
- Written by: Jim Thorpe (autobiography); Russell Birdwell (biography); Frank Davis (additional dialogue); Vincent X. Flaherty (adaptation); Everett Freeman (screenplay); Douglas Morrow (adaptation and screenplay)
- Produced by: Everett Freeman
- Starring: Burt Lancaster; Charles Bickford; Phyllis Thaxter
- Cinematography: Ernest Haller
- Edited by: Folmar Blangsted
- Music by: Max Steiner
- Distributed by: Warner Bros. Pictures
- Release date: August 24, 1951 (New York)
- Running time: 107 minutes
- Country: United States
- Language: English
- Box office: $1.55 million (US rentals)

Jim Thorpe – All-American (UK title: Man of Bronze) is a 1951 American biographical sports film directed by Michael Curtiz and starring Burt Lancaster as Jim Thorpe, the great Sac and Fox Nation Indian athlete who won medals at the 1912 Olympics and distinguished himself in various sports, both in college and on professional teams.

The film features some archival footage of both the 1912 and 1932 Summer Olympics, as well as other footage of the real Thorpe (seen in long shots). Charles Bickford narrates the film and plays the famed coach Glenn Scobey "Pop" Warner, who was Thorpe's longtime mentor.

== Plot ==
During a banquet, legendary football coach "Pop" Warner delivers a speech praising Jim Thorpe, which leads to a flashback.

Young Jim Thorpe runs home before his first day at an Indian reservation school, but his father convinces him to return, telling him that he wants his son to make something of himself. Years later, Jim attends Carlisle Indian Industrial School, where his roommates are fast-talking Ed Guyac and the huge Little Boy Who Walk Like Bear. However, he nearly fights with upperclassman and football star Peter Allendine, with whom he competes for the affections of fellow student Margaret Miller.

When Jim outraces some track athletes, coach Pop Warner convinces him to join the track team. Jim is so talented that he defeats the other team singlehandedly at a meet. Newspapers begin reporting his impressive feats.

Jim wants to join the football team, but Pop is hesitant, worried about losing most of his track team should an injury occur, but he reluctantly agrees. He keeps Jim on the sideline before allowing him to play in a game against Harvard, but only as a kicker. After scrambling for a touchdown after dropping the ball, Jim becomes a celebrated football star.

Jim tells Pop that he wants to become a coach someday. With scouts from a school seeking a coach in attendance, Carlisle plays to a 13–13 tie against Penn and Jim kicks a seemingly impossible field goal in the final seconds. However, the job goes to Tom Ashenbrunner of Penn, and Jim suspects it is because he is an Indian.

Jim tells Margaret, whom he has been dating, that he wants to marry her. When Margaret does not return for the new semester, Jim becomes despondent, especially after he learns that Margaret is white. Pop arranges a nurse job for Margaret at the school and steers Jim to her, and they reconcile and marry.

Jim wishes to become so famous that some school will hire him as a coach. He enters the 1912 Olympics and wins both the pentathlon and the decathlon. However, when it is discovered that he was paid a pittance to play baseball one summer, he is disqualified and stripped of his medals and trophies because he is not an amateur.

Embittered, Jim turns to professional baseball and football to earn a living. He and Margaret have a son, and he envisions Jim Jr. following in his footsteps and recapturing the glory that had been stolen from him. However, Jim Jr. dies while Jim is away in Chicago with the Canton Bulldogs, sending him into a downward spiral, and Margaret eventually leaves him.

Pop finds Jim working as a lowly announcer at a dance marathon. Pop offers him a ticket to the opening of the 1932 Olympics, but Jim tears it. Later, he tapes it together and attends the ceremony. He reconciles with Pop and his resentment dissolves.

One day, Jim's car crushes a football belonging to a group of kids, so he buys a new one and presents it to them. Watching them play, he offers guidance, and they ask him to become their coach, lifting his spirits.

At the banquet, Jim is inducted into the Oklahoma Hall of Fame.

== Cast ==
- Burt Lancaster as Jim Thorpe
- Billy Gray as Jim Thorpe as a child
- Charles Bickford as Glenn S. "Pop" Warner
- Steve Cochran as Peter Allendine
- Phyllis Thaxter as Margaret Miller
- Dick Wesson as Ed Guyac
- Jack Bighead as Little Boy Who Walk Like Bear
- Sonny Chorre as Wally Denny
- Al Mejia as Louis Tewanema
- Hubie Kerns as Tom Ashenbrunner
- Eula Morgan as Charlotte Thorpe
- Jack Baston as King Gustav (uncredited)
- Jim Thorpe as Coaching Assistant (uncredited)

== Production ==
Bacone College, a university serving the Indian tribes of the area in Muskogee, Oklahoma, was photographed as the Carlisle Indian Industrial School for the film.

== Reception ==
In a contemporary review for The New York Times, critic A. H. Weiler called the film "a disturbingly standard history" and wrote: "It is a story recognizable from former film performances and not from the unique Thorpe's life. That, in itself, is unfortunate. For Michael Curtiz, the director, as well as the cast and scenarists, have not glorified their subject beyond credibility. They have indicated that Thorpe's career was not one long series of triumphs but was studded with setbacks that kept him from his ambition to coach—defeats that would have broken a lesser man sooner. But, in following that format, the excitement inherent in such a colorful existence is, except for the earlier portions of the film, familiar and not especially dramatic."

== See also ==
- List of American football films
