= The Traveling Saleswoman =

1950 film by Charles Reisner

- Theatrical release poster
- Directed by: Charles Reisner
- Screenplay by: Howard Dimsdale
- Produced by: Tony Owen
- Starring: Joan Davis; Andy Devine; Adele Jergens; Joe Sawyer; Dean Riesner
- Cinematography: George E. Diskant
- Edited by: Viola Lawrence
- Production company: Columbia Pictures
- Distributed by: Columbia Pictures
- Release date: February 15, 1950
- Running time: 75 minutes
- Country: United States
- Language: English

The Traveling Saleswoman is a 1950 American Western comedy film directed by Charles Reisner and starring Joan Davis, Andy Devine, Adele Jergens, Joe Sawyer and Dean Riesner. The film was released by Columbia Pictures on February 15, 1950.

== Cast ==
- Joan Davis as Mabel King
- Andy Devine as Waldo
- Adele Jergens as Lilly
- Joe Sawyer as Cactus Jack
- Dean Riesner as Tom
- John Cason as Fred
- Chief Thundercloud as Running Deer
- Victor Adamson as Barfly (uncredited)
- Fred Aldrich as Cowpuncher (uncredited)
- Stanley Andrews as Dr. Stephen Monroe (uncredited)
- Jessie Arnold as Lady Customer (uncredited)
- Al Bridge as P. Carter (uncredited)
- Ralph Bucko as Townsman (uncredited)
- Roy Bucko as Townsman (uncredited)
- Robert Cherry as Simon Owen (uncredited)
- George Chesebro as Wounded Man (uncredited)
- Gertrude Chorre as Squaw (uncredited)
- Sonny Chorre as Indian (uncredited)
- Heinie Conklin as Man (uncredited)
- Victor Cox as Barfly (uncredited)
- Charles Vernon David Cypert as Indian (uncredited)
- William Monroe Cypert as Indian (uncredited)
- Rube Dalroy as Barfly (uncredited)
- Jack Evans as Townsman (uncredited)
- Herman Hack as Townsman (uncredited)
- Charles Halton as Banker Clumhill (uncredited)
- Harry Hayden as J.L. King (uncredited)
- Teddy Infuhr as Homer Owen (uncredited)
- Ethan Laidlaw as Mike Jenkins (uncredited)
- Pierce Lyden as Henchman (uncredited)
- Emmett Lynn as Desert Rat (uncredited)
- Hank Mann as Man in Saloon (uncredited)
- Louis Mason as Livery Stable Man (uncredited)
- Kermit Maynard as Townsman (uncredited)
- George McDonald as Bobby (uncredited)
- George Morrell as Man in Saloon (uncredited)
- William Newell as Bartender (uncredited)
- Frank O'Connor as Townsman (uncredited)
- Nick Thompson as Medicine Man (uncredited)
- Jack Tornek as Barfly (uncredited)
- Harry Tyler as Jasper North (uncredited)
- Minerva Urecal as Mrs. Owen (uncredited)
- Eddy Waller as Mr. Owen (uncredited)
- Blackie Whiteford as Stock Footage Outlaw (uncredited)
- Robert J. Wilke as Loser (uncredited)
- William Wilkerson as Tony (uncredited)
- Harry Woods as Soap Factory Mechanic (uncredited)
- Chief Yowlachie as Sam (uncredited)
