= Missing (1918 film) =

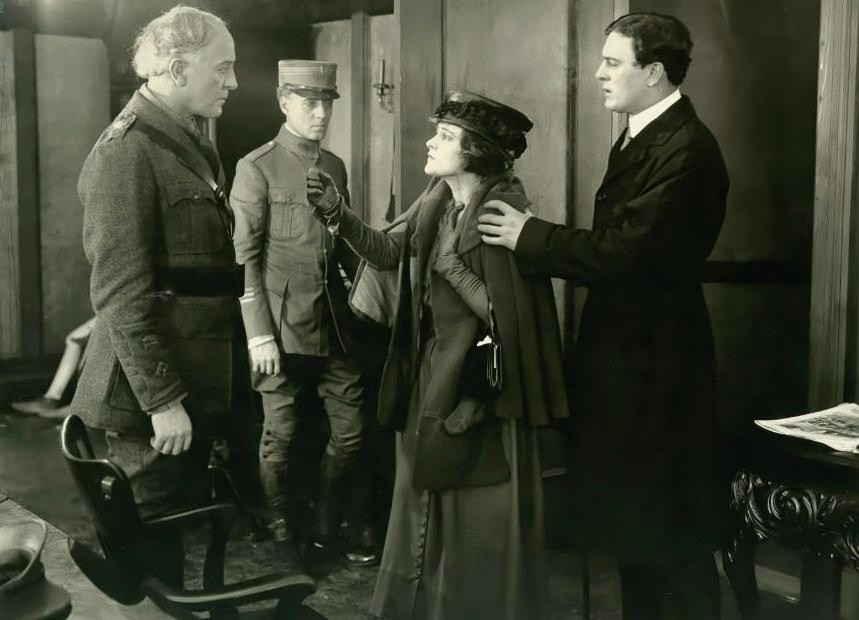
- Film still
- Directed by: James Young
- Screenplay by: J. Stuart Blackton; James Young
- Based on: Missing; 1917 novel by Mary Augusta Ward
- Produced by: J. Stuart Blackton
- Starring: Thomas Meighan; Sylvia Breamer; Robert Gordon; Winter Hall; Ola Humphrey; Mollie McConnell
- Cinematography: L. William O'Connell
- Production company: J. Stuart Blackton Feature Pictures
- Distributed by: Paramount Pictures
- Release date: June 16, 1918
- Running time: 50 minutes
- Country: United States
- Language: Silent (English intertitles)

Missing is a 1918 American silent drama film directed by James Young and written by Mary Augusta Ward, J. Stuart Blackton, and James Young. The film stars Thomas Meighan, Sylvia Breamer, Robert Gordon, Winter Hall, Ola Humphrey and Mollie McConnell. The film was released on June 16, 1918, by Paramount Pictures.

== Plot ==
Nell and Lt. George Surratt are happily married, but Nell's sister Hester is disappointed because she had hoped to obtain social standing and wealth through the marriage by Nell to an old but wealthy man. Shortly after the marriage, George joins the fighting men in France, but is later reported missing. Sir William Farrell, who cannot go to war because of lameness, becomes interested in Nell, and Hester, forcing Nell to believe her husband is dead, urges her to accept Sir William's proposal. Although Hester tries to intercept it, Nell receives a message that George is alive but suffering from shell shock. The singing of his favorite song, "Bonnie Sweet Bessie", by his wife completely restores his memory and they are happily reunited.

== Cast ==
- Thomas Meighan as Sir William Farrell
- Sylvia Breamer as Nell Surratt
- Robert Gordon as Lt. George Surratt
- Winter Hall as Dr. Howson
- Ola Humphrey as Hester
- Mollie McConnell as Mrs. Greyson
- Kathleen O'Connor as Cicely
