= The Diamond from the Sky =

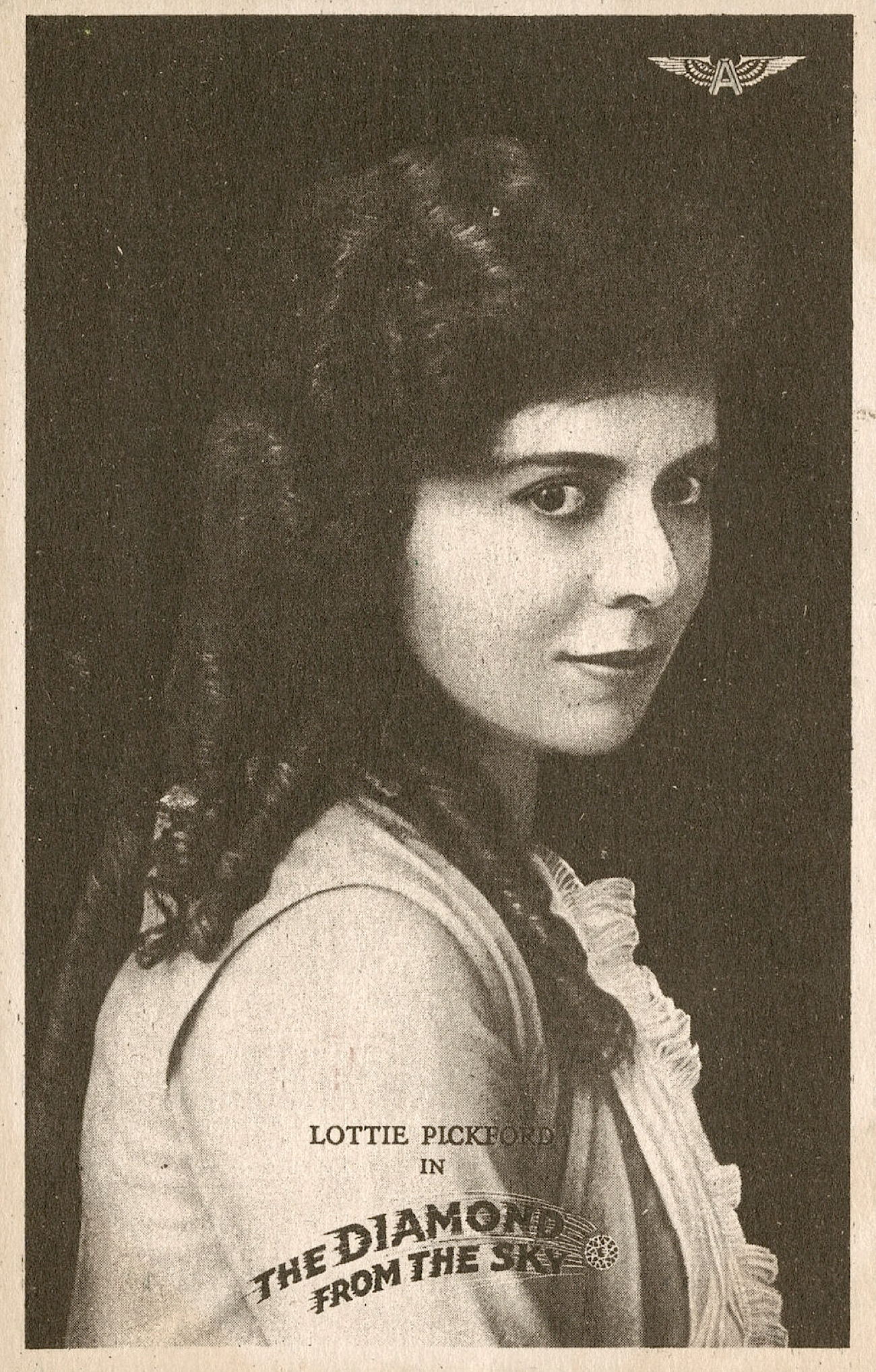
- Movie poster
- Directed by: Jacques Jaccard; William Desmond Taylor
- Written by: Roy L. McCardell
- Starring: Lottie Pickford; Irving Cummings; William Russell
- Production company: American Film Manufacturing Company - Flying "A" Studios
- Distributed by: American Film Manufacturing Company
- Release date: May 3, 1915 (episode one)
- Running time: 900 minutes (30 episodes)
- Country: United States
- Language: Silent (English intertitles)
- Budget: $800,000

The Diamond from the Sky is a 1915 American silent adventure-film serial directed by Jacques Jaccard and William Desmond Taylor and starring Lottie Pickford, Irving Cummings, and William Russell.

No copies of this serial's "chapters" have been found, so the overall production is currently classified as a lost film.

== Plot ==
The prologue in the serial's first episode, "A Heritage of Hate", depicts the discovery of a spectacular diamond inside a meteorite, a gem that later becomes the property of the Stanley family, who call their heirloom "The Diamond From the Sky". The remainder of the first chapter portrays the intense rivalry between Colonel Arthur Stanley and Judge Lamar Stanley, Virginia aristocrats and descendants of Lord Arthur Stanley, 200 years later.

When a girl is born to the young wife of Colonel Arthur Stanley, the latter, to retain an earldom and "The Diamond From the Sky," buys a new born Gypsy baby boy and substitutes it for his own babe. Judge Lamar Stanley visits Colonel Arthur Stanley's home to see the child just as Hagar, the gypsy woman, bursts into the room to demand her boy, and the colonel falls unconscious across the library table.

== Cast ==
- Lottie Pickford as Esther Stanley, the Gypsy Heroine. The role was originally offered to her sister Mary Pickford.
- Irving Cummings as Arthur Stanley II
- William Russell as Blair Stanley
- Charlotte Burton as Vivian Marston
- Eugenie Forde as Hagar Harding
- George Periolat as Luke Lovell
- Orral Humphrey as Marmaduke Smythe
- William Tedmarsh as Quabba, The Hunchback
- Hart Hoxie as Matt Hardigan
- George Field
- Rhea Mitchell
- Nell Franzen
- Roy Stewart
- Charles Watt

== Chapter titles ==
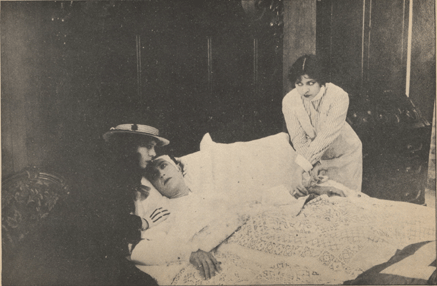
Lottie Pickford (left), Irving Cummings, and Charlotte Burton in one "chapter" from The Diamond from the Sky

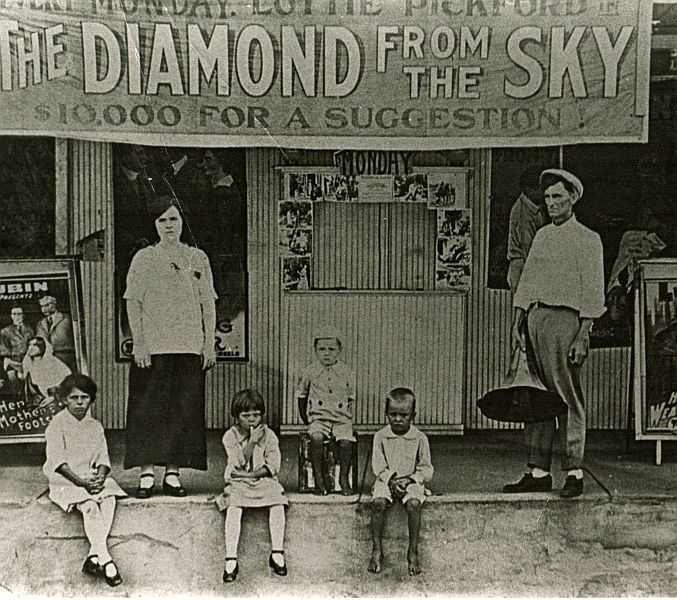
Promotional banner for the serial and its $10,000 prize at a theater in Rockwall, Texas, 1915 or 1916.

1. A Heritage of Hate
2. An Eye For An Eye
3. The Silent Witness
4. The Prodigal's Progress
5. For The Sake of A False Friend
6. Shadows at Sunrise
7. The Fox and The Pig
8. A Mind In The Past
9. A Runaway Match
10. Old Foes With New Faces
11. The Web of Destiny
12. To The Highest Bidder
13. The Man In The Mask
14. For Love And Money
15. Desperate Chances
16. The Path of Peril
17. The King of Diamonds and the Queen of Hearts
18. The Charm Against Harm
19. Fire, Fury And Confusion
20. The Soul Stranglers
21. The Lion's Bride
22. The Rose In The Dust
23. The Double Cross
24. The Mad Millionaire
25. A House of Cards
26. The Garden of The Gods
27. Mine Own People
28. On the Wings of the Morning
29. A Deal With Destiny
30. The American Earl

== Production notes ==
- The serial's overall storyline was purposely left unfinished in the same manner as The Million Dollar Mystery. A prize of $5,000 was offered for its completion, which was won by Terry Ramsaye.
- While on location during the production of the "continued photoplay", director William Desmond Taylor was nearly electrocuted by an exposed power line. The trade magazine Motion Picture News reported the near tragedy in its August 7, 1915, issue:
  W. D. Taylor, director of "The Diamond from the Sky," the North American Film Corporation's $800,000 continued photoplay, had a narrow escape from death a few days ago, when he accidentally stepped on a heavy charged electric wire. The members of the company were at work in a tunnel, in which one of the scenes takes place, when Taylor, walking in advance of the players, stepped on the wire, which was uncovered. Luckily, a physician employed in the mining camp nearby had come over to watch the taking of the scene. He offered immediate assistance.

== See also ==
- List of film serials
- List of film serials by studio
- List of lost films
- Sequel to the Diamond from the Sky (1916)
