= H. J. Goetzman =

American photographer

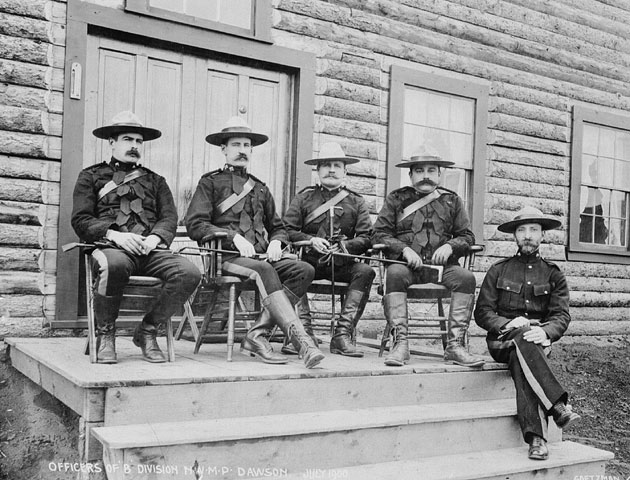
Officers of 'B' Division, North-West Mounted Police in Dawson City, Yukon (July 1900)

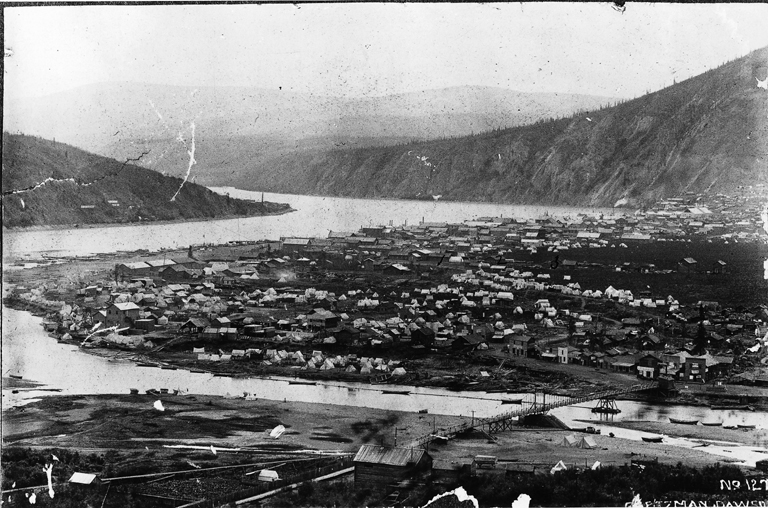
Dawson City and the Klondike River ca. 1898

Henry Jacob Goetzman (May 10, 1864 – after 1904) was an American photographer best known for documenting the Klondike Gold Rush.

Goetzman was in Rochester, New York and lived in Dawson City in Canada's Yukon Territory during the end of the 19th and early 20th centuries. The studio he established in Dawson City lasted from 1898 to 1904. Goetzman's wife Mary W. and daughter Edith were involved in his business. Edith attended Snell Seminary in California and Mary Goetzman sent her letters on birchbark.

His work has been collected by the Orbis Cascade Alliance.

== See also ==
- Eric A. Hegg
