= Namahyoke Curtis =

American nurse and civil leader (1861–1935)

- Born: Namahyoke Gertrude Sockum; July 1871; San Francisco, California, US
- Died: November 25, 1935 (aged 64); Washington, D.C., US
- Resting place: Arlington National Cemetery
- Occupations: Nurse; civil leader
- Spouse: Austin Maurice Curtis (m. 1888)

Namahyoke "Namah" Gertrude Sockum Curtis (née Sockum; July 1871 – November 25, 1935) was an American nurse and civil leader. She recruited 32 African-American nurses to serve with the US Army in the Spanish American War. The nurses were supposed to be immune to diseases common in Cuba, specifically yellow fever. Her husband was the superintendent of the Freedmen's Hospital. After the 1900 Galveston hurricane, she volunteered her services as a nurse. After the 1906 San Francisco earthquake, Curtis served as a nurse on a commission from William Howard Taft.

== Early life and education ==
Curtis was born Namahyoke Gertrude Sockum in San Francisco, California on July 1871 to Hamilton Sockum and Irene Sockum. Curtis' father was Native American (Note: Possibly Acoma Pueblo or Nanticoke) and her mother was African-American and German.

In 1888, Curtis graduated from Snell Seminary.

== Career ==
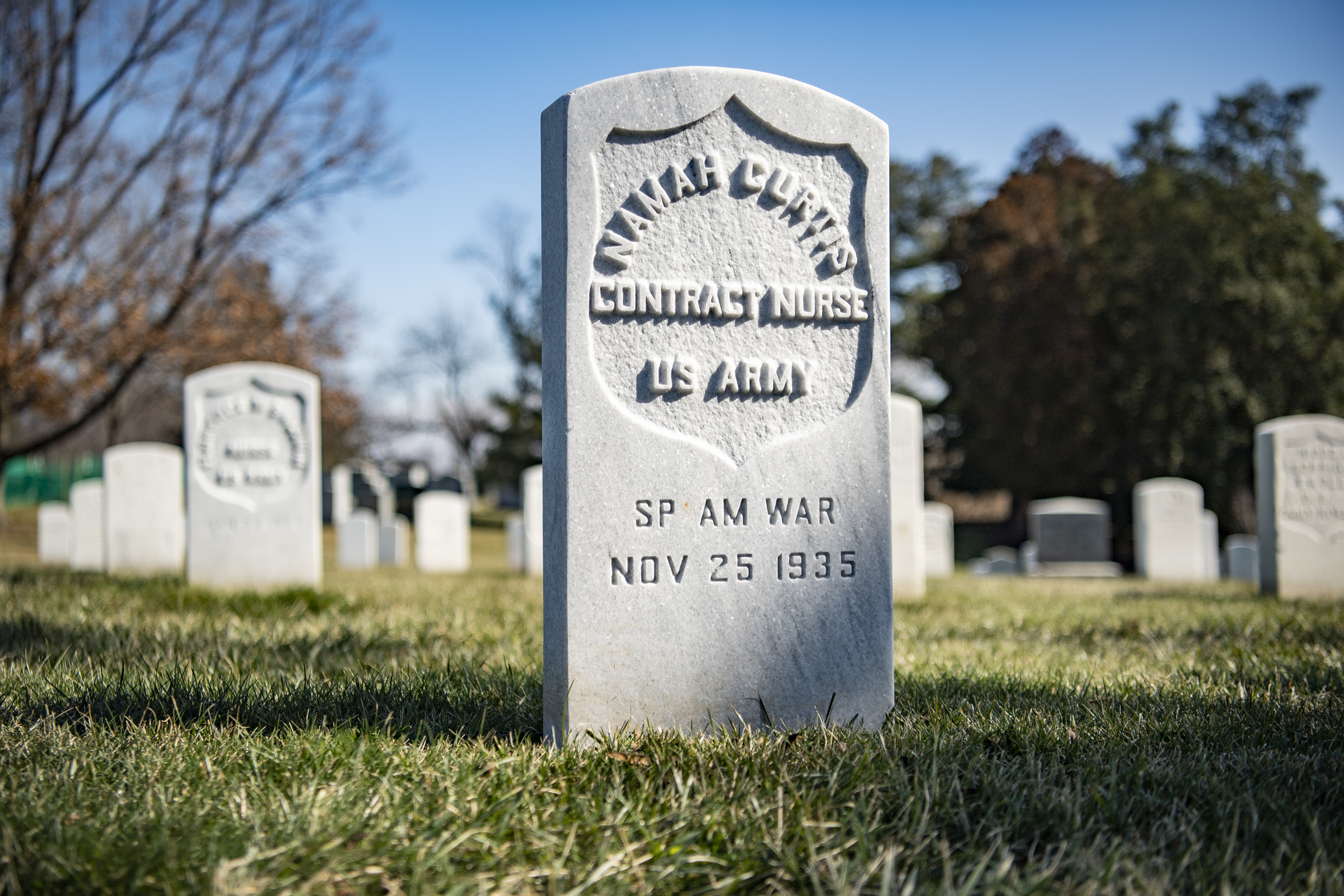
Grave at Arlington National Cemetery

Following her marriage to the physician Austin Maurice Curtis in 1888, Curtis moved to Chicago. Played a large role in fundraising for and creating Provident Hospital.

A campaigner for President William McKinley, Curtis and her family were given special seats at his inauguration.

In 1898, they moved to Washington, D.C. During the Spanish American War, she was hired to recruit nurses, specifically immune to typhoid fever. Curtis succeeded in recruiting 32 such nurses, of whom at least two would later die due to typhoid fever. From that, she earned a pension, and government commendation. During both the Galveston hurricane and subsequent flood, and the later San Francisco earthquake, Curtis would play a role in helping nurse the wounded. Namah was recognized for her service with a high commendation, a lifelong government pension, and burial in Arlington National Cemetery.

On November 25, 1935 Curtis died in Washington D.C. aged 64. Curtis was later buried at Arlington National Cemetery on November 29, 1935.
