= Under the Crescent =

1915 film directed by Burton L. King

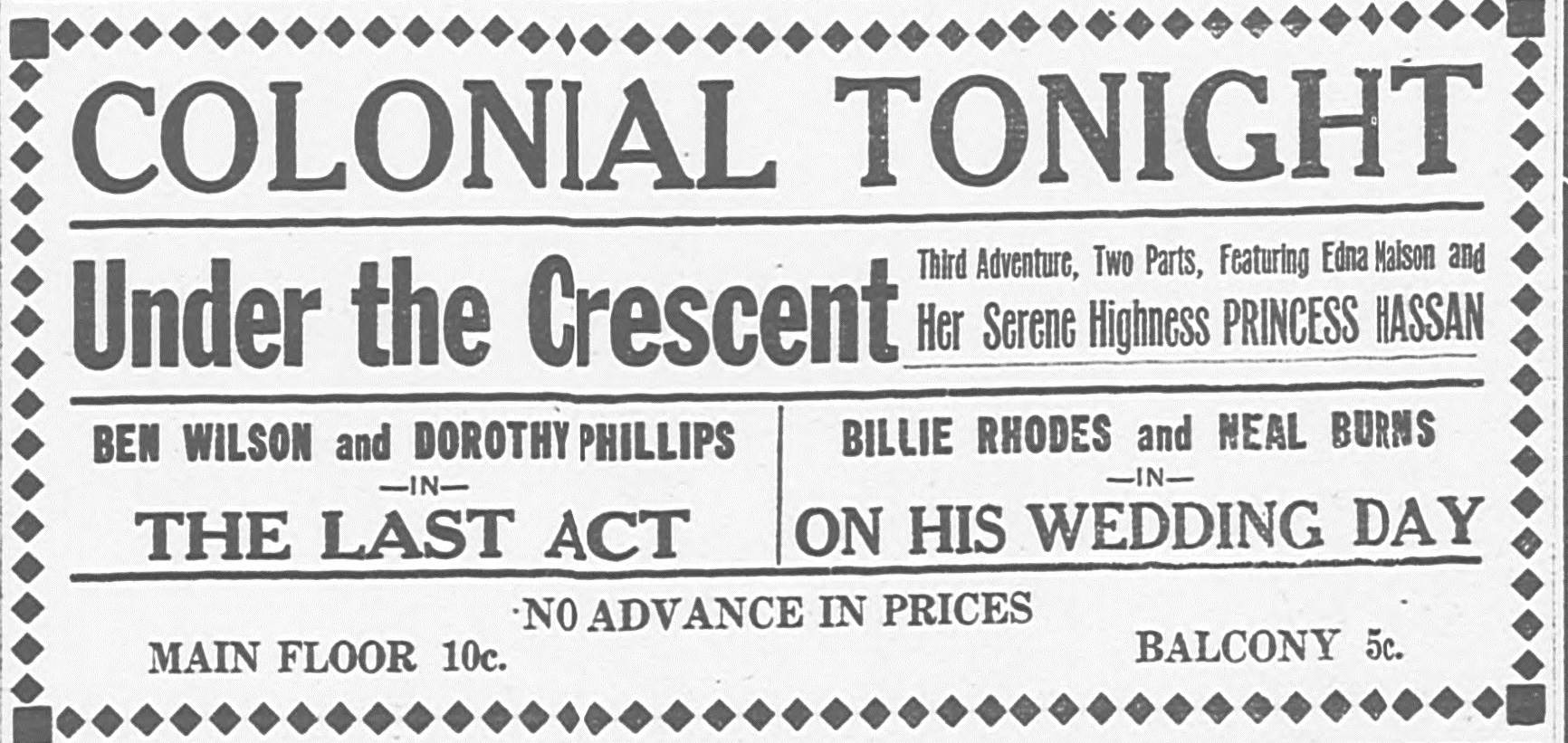
- Contemporary newspaper advertisement
- Directed by: Burton L. King
- Written by: Nell Shipman
- Starring: Ola Humphrey
- Distributed by: Universal Film Manufacturing Co.
- Release date: June 1, 1915
- Running time: 6 episodes
- Country: United States
- Language: Silent with English intertitles

Under the Crescent is a 1915 American drama film serial directed by Burton L. King, starring Ola Humphrey, and released by Universal. The film is considered to be lost.

== Plot ==
A series of six episodes involving the adventures of an American actress in modern Egypt (circa 1910s). The story is biographical; it was based on the real life of its lead actress, Ola Humphrey, who in 1911 married Egyptian Prince Ibrahim Hassan, cousin of the Khedive.

== Cast ==
- Ola Humphrey as The American Actress
- William C. Dowlan as Stanley Clyde
- Edward Sloman as Prince Ibrahim Tousson
- Helen Wright as Princess Ousson
- Carmen Phillips as Princess Uarda
- William Quinn as Said Pasha
- Henry Canfield as Sir Godfrey (credited as H.E. Canfield)
- Orral Humphrey as Meheimit Ali
- Edna Maison as Princess Zohna

== Chapter titles ==
1. The Purple Iris
2. The Cage of the Golden Bars
3. In The Shadows of the Pyramids
4. For The Honor of a Woman
5. In The Name of the King
6. The Crown of Death

== See also ==
- List of film serials
- List of film serials by studio
- List of lost films

== Works cited ==
- Armatage, Kay (2003). The Girl from God's Country: Nell Shipman and the Silent Cinema. University of Toronto Press. ISBN 9781442681378.
