= All of a Sudden Peggy =

1920 film by Walter Edwards

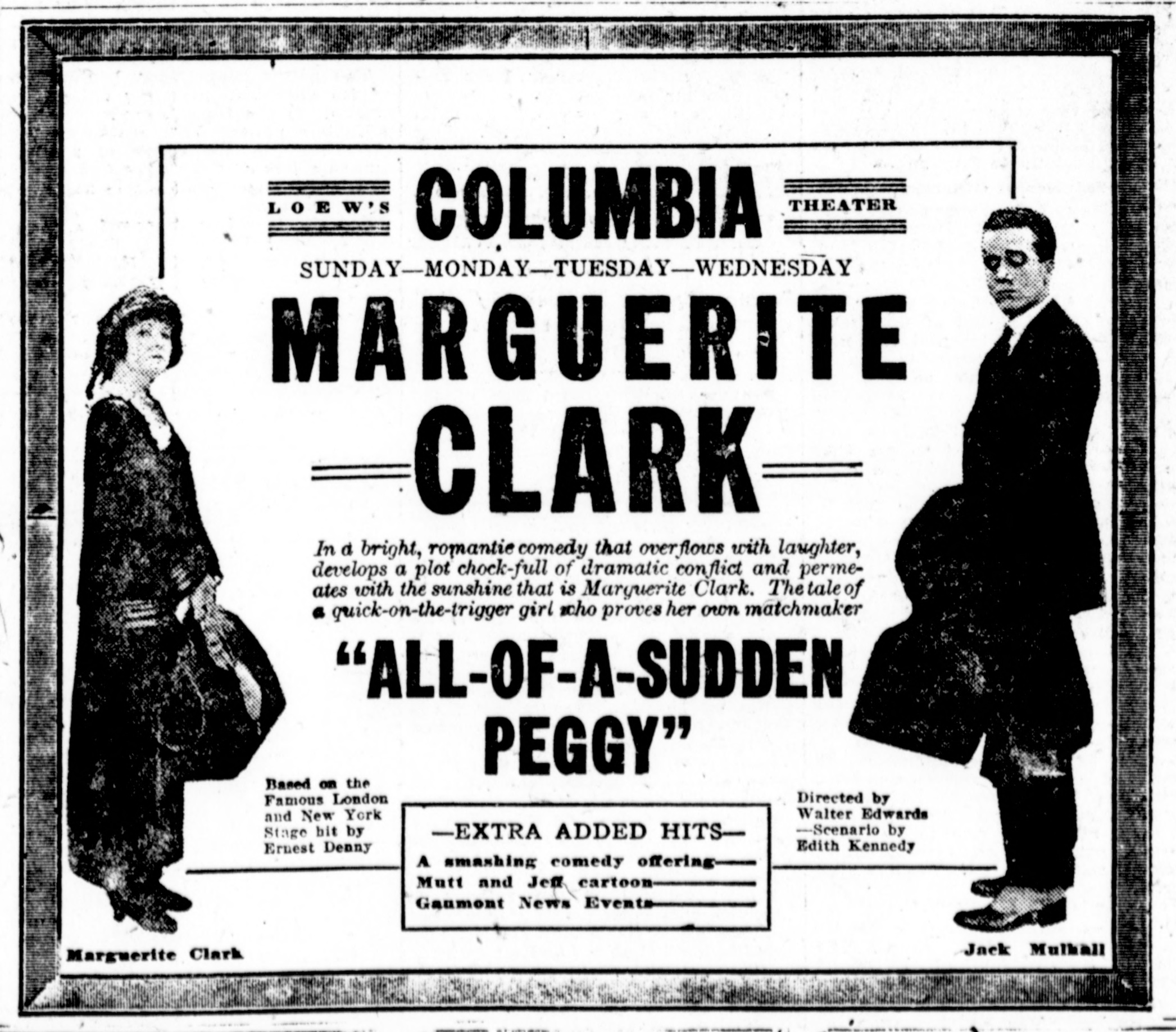
- Newspaper advertisement.
- Directed by: Walter Edwards
- Written by: Edith Kennedy
- Based on: All-of-a-Sudden-Peggy by Ernest Denny
- Produced by: Adolph Zukor
- Starring: Marguerite Clark; Jack Mulhall
- Cinematography: William Marshall
- Distributed by: Paramount Pictures
- Release date: February 1, 1920
- Running time: 5 reels (4,448 feet)
- Country: United States
- Language: Silent (English intertitles)

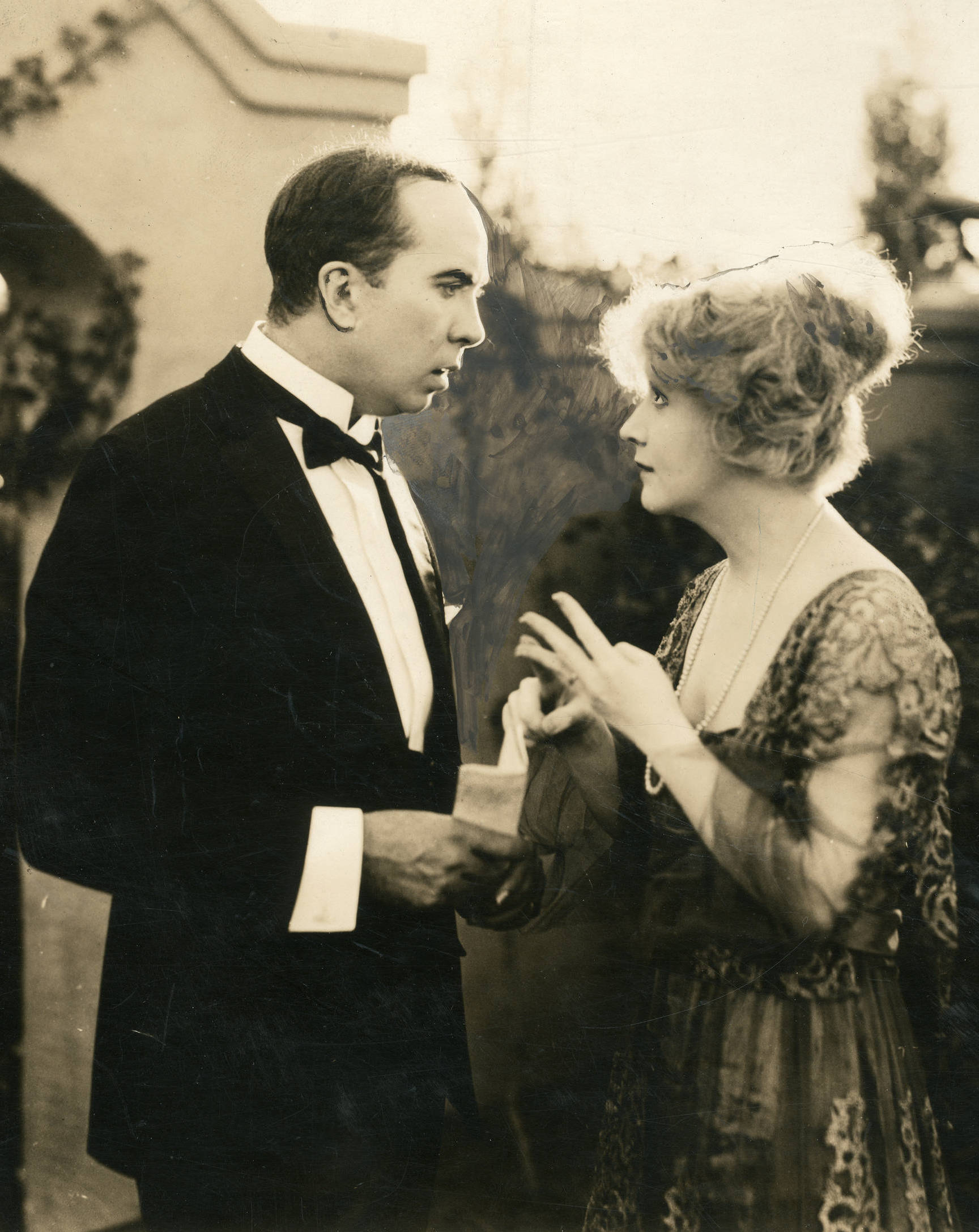
A scene from All-of-a-Sudden Peggy

All of a Sudden Peggy is a lost 1920 American silent comedy romance film directed by Walter Edwards and starring Marguerite Clark and Jack Mulhall. It was produced by Famous Players–Lasky and distributed by Paramount Pictures. It is based on a 1907 Broadway play All-of-a-Sudden Peggy which starred Henrietta Crosman. It is Clark's third to last film. Director Edwards died in Hawaii that same year of 1920.

== Plot ==
As described in a film magazine, Peggy O'Hara who with her widowed mother Mrs. O'Hara is staying at the manor of Lord Anthony Crackenthorpe, a scientist engrossed in the study of spiders. Mrs. O'Hara is assisting Lord Anthony. The sister of the peer sends for her son Jimmy because she thinks Peggy has designs on Lord Anthony. Jimmy falls in love with Peggy, and in order to further her mother's love affair with Lord Anthony, Peggy announces her engagement with Jimmy. She goes to London where her pocket is picked, and has to stay at Jimmy's bachelor quarters while he is away on business. The sudden appearance of Jimmy, his mother and father, and a prying neighbor precipitates matters, with Peggy having spent the night there suggesting a scandal. In the end it is straightened out and Peggy consents to marry Jimmy.

== Cast ==
- Marguerite Clark as Peggy O'Hara
- Jack Mulhall as Honorable Jimmy Keppel
- Lillian Leighton as Mrs. O'Hara
- Maggie Fisher as Lady Crackenthorpe
- Orral Humphrey as Anthony, Lord Crackenthorpe
- Sylvia Jocelyn as Millicent Keppel
- A. Edward Sutherland as Jack Menzies
- Tom Ricketts as Major Archie Phipps
- Virginia Foltz as Mrs. Colquhoun
