= Pied Piper Malone =

1924 film by Alfred E. Green

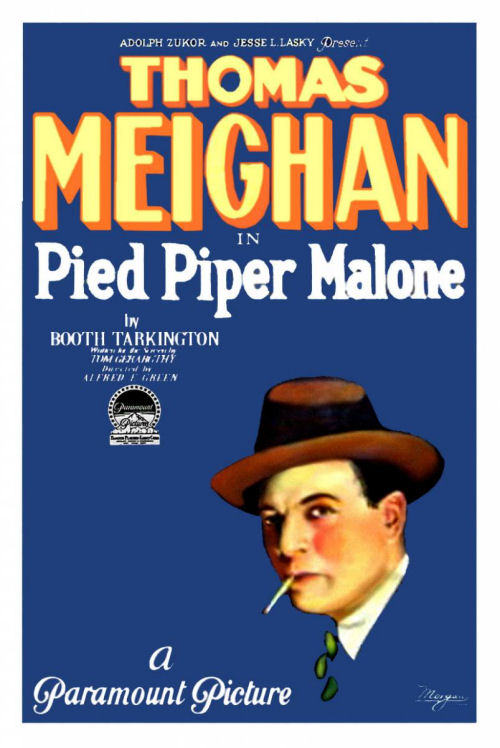
- Theatrical release poster
- Directed by: Alfred E. Green
- Written by: Thomas J. Geraghty (screenplay, intertitles)
- Story by: Booth Tarkington
- Produced by: Adolph Zukor; Jesse L. Lasky
- Starring: Thomas Meighan; Lois Wilson; Emma Dunn
- Cinematography: Ernest Haller
- Production company: Famous Players–Lasky
- Distributed by: Paramount Pictures
- Release date: February 4, 1924
- Running time: 77 minutes
- Country: United States
- Language: Silent (English intertitles)

Pied Piper Malone is a 1924 American silent comedy drama film directed by Alfred E. Green and starring Thomas Meighan. The Famous Players–Lasky produced the film and Paramount Pictures distributed.

== Plot ==
As described in a film magazine review, sailor Jack Malone and Charles Crosby, second mate of the steamer Langland, are in love with Patty Thomas of Oldport. Crosby gets drunk on duty and Jack is promoted in his place by Captain Clarke. The Langland gets into serious difficulties during a storm and sinks while the crew escape in boats. Crosby reaches Oldport first and accuses the Captain and Jack of being intoxicated and causing the disaster. All the town folk, including Patty, believe him. However, in the end, Jack Malone's name is cleared by the children of the town, who know Jack as the "Pied Piper." Jack also wins back Patty.

== Cast ==
- Thomas Meighan as Jack Malone
- Lois Wilson as Patty Thomas
- Emma Dunn as Mother Malone
- Charles A. Stevenson as James P. Malone
- George Fawcett as Captain Clarke
- Cyril Ring as Charles Crosby Jr.
- Claude Brook as Charles Crosby Sr.
- Joseph Burke as Mr. Thomas
- Peaches Jackson as Betty Malone
- Charles Winninger as Louie, the barber
- Hugh Cameron as Photographer
- Dorothy Walters as Housekeeper
- Pearl Sindelar as Malone sister
- Marie Schaefer as Malone sister
- Elizabeth Henry as Malone sister
- Helen Mack as Child (credited as Helen Macks)

== Preservation ==
A print is reportedly held at Gosfilmofond, in Moscow.
