= The Lure of the Mask =

1908 novel by Harold MacGrath

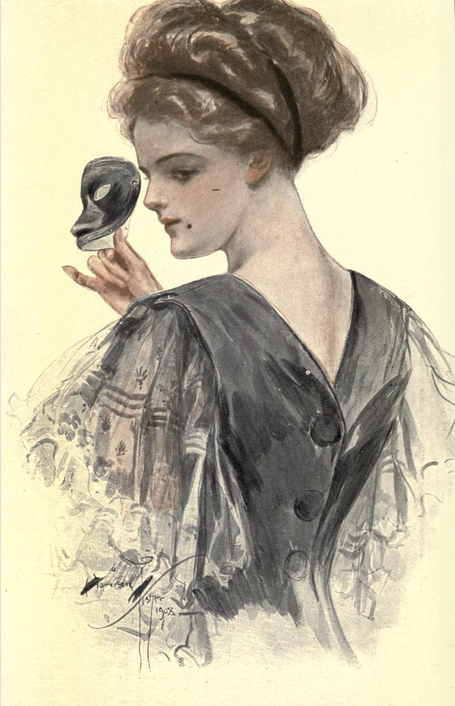
- Frontispiece by Harrison Fisher
- Author: Harold MacGrath
- Illustrator: Harrison Fisher and Karl Anderson
- Language: English
- Genre: Novel
- Publisher: Bobbs-Merrill Company
- Publication date: May 1908
- Publication place: United States
- Media type: Print (hardcover)
- Pages: 401 pp

The Lure of the Mask is a 1908 novel by Harold MacGrath that was the fourth-best selling book in the United States for that year.

In 1906-07, MacGrath made visits to Italy, and his impressions from those trips inspired the novel.

== Plot ==
A 1908 review of the book summarizes the light plot of the story in overenthusiastic fashion:

The story opens with a jump--literally. A young New Yorker, rich, of course, hears from his window on a night of fog and mist a woman's voice singing divinely. He falls in love with it head over heels and he falls downstairs in about the same way, he is such a hurry to see the singer. But by the time her reaches the street, lo! she has vanished, and only a policeman remains. Late on, this young, adventurous Mr. Hillard again meets the young, adventurous singer under most mystifying circumstances. They dine together, but she comes in mask. What the voice has begun, the masks puts the finishing touches to. From then on Hillard is full forty fathoms deep in love and curiosity. Then the scene shifts to Italy, with the shifting fortunes of an American comic opera company, stranded at Venice. The beautiful singer becomes the prima donna of this company. The soubrette is one Kitty Killigrew, and around her flourishes a most enticing, exciting and enlivening subplot. She dances her way straight into your heart. Amusing things happen at Venice. Thrilling things happen at Monte Carlo. At Florence the climax is reached, and it makes you fairly gasp with its intense interest. At Bellagio, the loveliest of lovely spots in the land of love, the curtain goes down on happy lovers.

== Adaptations ==
The novel was adapted for a silent film in 1915, directed by Tom Ricketts and starring Harold Lockwood and Elsie Jane Wilson.
