= The Wily Chaperon =

- Directed by: Thomas Ricketts
- Starring: Perry Banks; Charlotte Burton; William Tedmarsh; Louise Lester; Vivian Rich; Harry Van Meter
- Distributed by: Mutual Film
- Release date: February 13, 1915
- Country: United States
- Languages: Silent film English intertitles

The Wily Chaperon is a 1915 American silent short comedy-drama film directed by Thomas Ricketts. The film stars Perry Banks, Charlotte Burton, William Tedmarsh, Louise Lester, Vivian Rich, and Harry Van Meter.
