= In Old California (1929 film) =

1929 film directed by Burton L. King

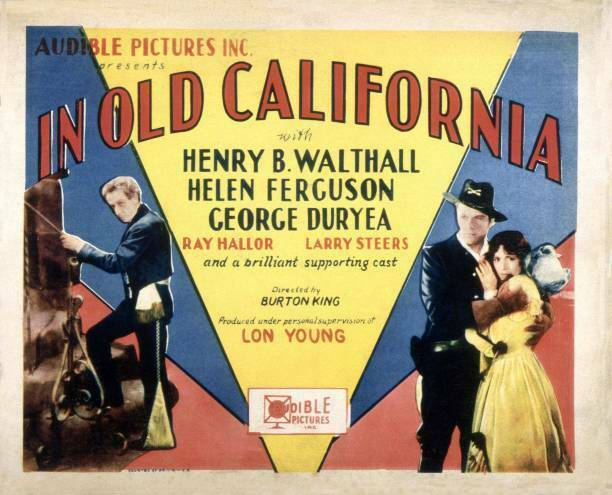
- Theatre poster
- Directed by: Burton L. King
- Written by: Fred Hart; Arthur Hoerl
- Starring: Tom Keene; Helen Ferguson; Henry B. Walthall
- Cinematography: Charles P. Boyle
- Edited by: Earl Turner
- Music by: Victor Young
- Production company: Audible Talking Pictures
- Distributed by: Audible Talking Pictures
- Release date: October 15, 1929
- Running time: 60 minutes
- Country: United States
- Language: English

In Old California is a lost 1929 American Western film directed by Burton L. King and starring Tom Keene, Helen Ferguson and Henry B. Walthall.

== Cast ==
- Tom Keene as Lt. Tony Hopkins
- Helen Ferguson as Dolores Radanell
- Henry B. Walthall as Don Pedro De León
- Carlotta Monti as Juanita
- Ray Hallor as Pedro DeLeón
- Orral Humphrey as Ike Boone
- Larry Steers as Ollie Radanell
- Richard Carlyle as Arturo
- Harry Allen as Sgt. Washburn
- Louis Stern as Ramón De Hermosa
- Paul Ellis as José
- Gertrude Chorre as Indian Servant

== Preservation ==
With no holdings located in archives, In Old California is considered a lost film.

== See also ==
- List of early sound feature films (1926–1929)

== Bibliography ==
- Roy Liebman. From Silents to Sound: A Biographical Encyclopedia of Performers who Made the Transition to Talking Pictures. McFarland, 1998.
