= The Dawn of Netta =

1912 film by Tom Ricketts

- Directed by: Tom Ricketts
- Starring: Donald MacDonald
- Production company: Nestor Film Company
- Distributed by: Universal Film Manufacturing Company
- Release date: June 24, 1912
- Running time: 20 minutes; 2 reels
- Country: United States
- Languages: Silent film (English intertitles)

The Dawn of Netta is a 1912 American silent short drama film directed by Tom Ricketts and starring Richard Buhler, Edgar L. Davenport, George De Carlton, and Dorothy Donnelly. It is the first film to be distributed by Universal Pictures. The film was released by Universal Film Manufacturing Company on June 24, 1912.

== Plot ==
The story is about a man named Will Barton, who has gone to the mountains in search of health. There, he finds out from a doctor that he is dying and becomes preoccupied with the thought of leaving his daughter Netta alone and unprotected in the world. He telegraphs his best friend, Jack Gordon, to come and see him. Upon his arrival, Barton asks Jack to marry Netta. Initially hesitant due to his current lifestyle, Jack agrees out of gratitude and pity for his dying friend.

Later, Jack sends Netta to a school in Paris, but as time passes, he gradually forgets his promise to Barton and his engagement to Netta, becoming attached to a widow named Mrs. Smith Douglas instead. When Netta returns, Jack persuades Mrs. Douglas to take care of her for a few days so that he can provide for her suitably, but neglects to inform her that he is engaged to Netta.

When Netta returns, Jack is surprised to find that she has grown into a beautiful woman, and he falls in love with her. However, seeing how popular Netta is with other young men, he struggles between his love and a desire to be unselfish. Eventually, he decides to give Netta her freedom so that she may marry someone closer to her age.

Netta is heartbroken by Jack's decision, but she consents, believing that he doesn't love her. However, Mrs. Douglas finds Netta and comforts her, learning of her secret love for Jack. She takes Jack to Netta, where they renew their troth in the soft light of the moon, and Mrs. Douglas draws the curtain gently to give them privacy.

== Cast ==
- Donald MacDonald as Will Barton

== See also ==
- List of American films of 1912
