= Snell Seminary =

Information
- Founder: Edna Snell
- Gender: Girls

Snell Seminary School for Women was a girls school in Oakland and then Berkeley, California.

== History ==
Edna Snell, (born September 29, 1843 in Farmington, New York) served a principal. At age 25, she was the only unmarried woman who attended the first meeting of the Northern Iowa Woman Suffrage meeting which was held in Dubuque, Iowa May 17, 1869, the first woman's suffrage organization in Iowa run by women. Her parents were devoted Quakers. She had been a Progressive Friend in New Sharon, Iowa. She graduated from the Ladies’ Course at Grinnell College in 1867. For three years following graduation she was assistant principal of Dubuque High School. In 1871 she was elected superintendent of schools of Mahaska County, Iowa. From Strong -Minded Women by Louise Noun, Iowa State University Press, 1969.

She became Edna Snell Poulson, and was one of Snell Seminary's principals. Mary Snell was also a principal. Their sister, Margaret Snell, helped at the school. Mary went on to found the Home Economics department (now the College of Public Health and Human Sciences) at Oregon State University.

Mary E. Snell worked at a school in Benicia. She eventually reorganized it before establishing Snell Seminary in Oakland. F Her family's involvement included three sisters and a brother who all helped with the school.

The school advertised in the San Francisco Call.

Edna Snell Poulson died in 1913, and the school chose Adelaide Smith as its new principal. She renamed it to "The Wellesley School", and it was listed as still headed by her as late as 1950.

The Orpheum Theater is located on the school's Oakland site.

== Legacy ==
The Oakland Museum of California has an old photo of the school and commencement pamphlets from 1883 and 1892 in their collection.

== Alumni ==
- Edith Goetzman, photographer
- Namahyoke Curtis (1861–1935), American nurse and civil leader
- Pearl Sindelar, actress
