= Orral Humphrey =

American actor

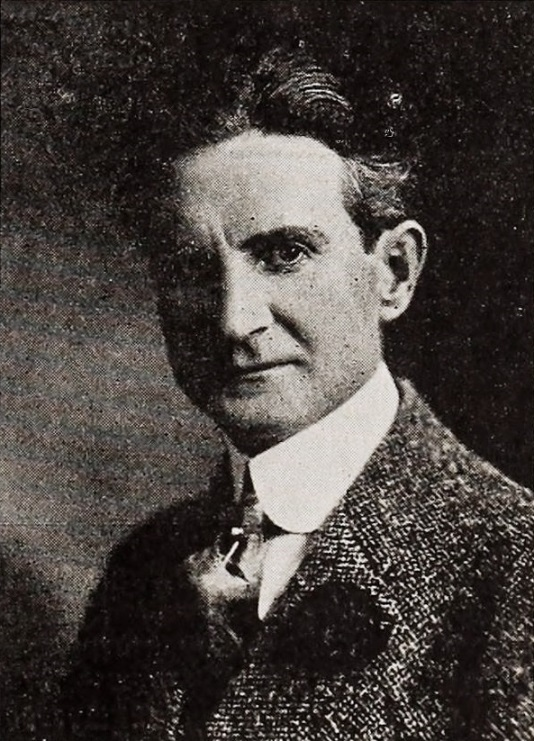
- Humphrey in 1923
- Born: April 3, 1878; Iowa, U.S.
- Died: August 12, 1929 (aged 51); Los Angeles, California, U.S.
- Occupations: Actor, Director
- Years active: 1915–1929
- Spouse(s): Carrie Adams (m. circa 1902; ?); Josephine E. Taylor (m. ?; div. 1918); Lois Frances Born (m. 1919)
- Children: 3
- Relatives: Ola Humphrey (sister)

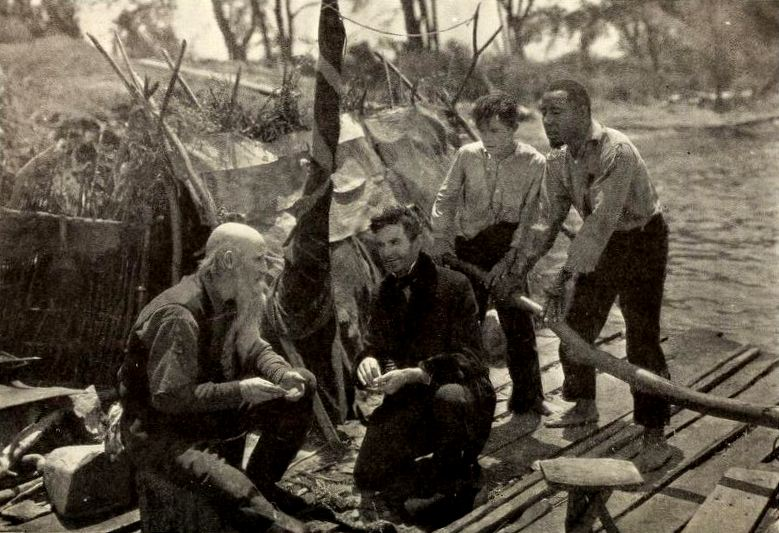
Tom Bates, Orrall Humphrey, Lewis Sargent, and George H. Reed in Huckleberry Finn (1920)

Thomas Orral Humphrey (April 3, 1878 - August 12, 1929) was an American silent film actor and director. He starred in 46 films between 1914 and 1929 and is credited for directing four films. His younger sister was actress Ola Humphrey.

== Early life and career ==
Born in Iowa and raised in Oakland, California, Humphrey was the eldest of two children born to Thomas M. Humphrey and Minerva "Minnie" J. Paschal. He attended Lafayette Elementary school.

Humphrey's first film was one of the most popular of 1915, The Diamond from the Sky in which he starred alongside Lottie Pickford, Charlotte Burton, Jack Hoxie, and other popular actors.

== Personal life and death ==
Humphrey was married to Carrie Adams, to actress Josephine E. "Jo" Taylor (his frequent onscreen wife, circa 1916), and, from 1919 until his death, to Lois Frances Born, with whom he had three children.

Humphrey died on August 12, 1929, in Los Angeles from injuries sustained during the filming of his final film, In Old California. He was survived by his wife and children.

== Selected filmography ==
- The Diamond from the Sky (1915)
- Under the Crescent (1915)
- Beauty and the Rogue (1918)
- The Midnight Man (1919)
- All of a Sudden Peggy (1920)
- Huckleberry Finn (1920)
- Broadway Madness (1927)
- In Old California (1929)
