= Charles Sindelar =

American illustrator (1875–1947)

Charles James Sindelar (27 May 1875 – 15 May 1947) was an American illustrator and painter, who in later life focused on religious art. Sindelar established a reputation for himself in graphic design and illustration during the first quarter of the 20th century through his favourably reviewed creation of a number of menu cover designs produced for a series of events referred to as the Lotos Club dinners, in New York City. The guest lists for the events included four U.S. presidents and other notables of the time, including writer Mark Twain. Sindelar's covers incorporated a likeness of the celebrity who was being feted at the event, accompanied by intricate detailing. In the 1930s and 1940s, along with May DaCamara (1894–1976), Sindelar produced artwork for the "I AM" Activity of the Saint Germain Foundation.

In 1940, Sindelar was one of the defendants in the I AM mail fraud trial, specifically concerning the group's claim that Jesus had personally sat for his portrait by Sindelar. The Ballards stated that other "Ascended Masters", including the Count of St. Germain, also posed for Sindelar, and further claimed that Sindelar was the reincarnation of Leonardo da Vinci. Gerald Barbee Bryan gave Sindelar credit for the portrait of the Count of St. Germain which was displayed on stage during services of the I AM movement. Norman Robert Westfall, writing as "Mah Atmah Amsumata", gave Sindelar credit for two more portraits, one of Jesus Christ, the other of Maitreya. Sindelar was personally acquitted of the charges against him.

From 1936 to March 1942, Charles Sindelar published and assisted in the production of The Voice of the I AM monthly magazine, as well as doing the artwork, at Sindelar Studios, 2600 S. Hoover Street, Los Angeles, California, U.S.A.
