= Tom Ricketts =

English-American actor and director (1853–1939)

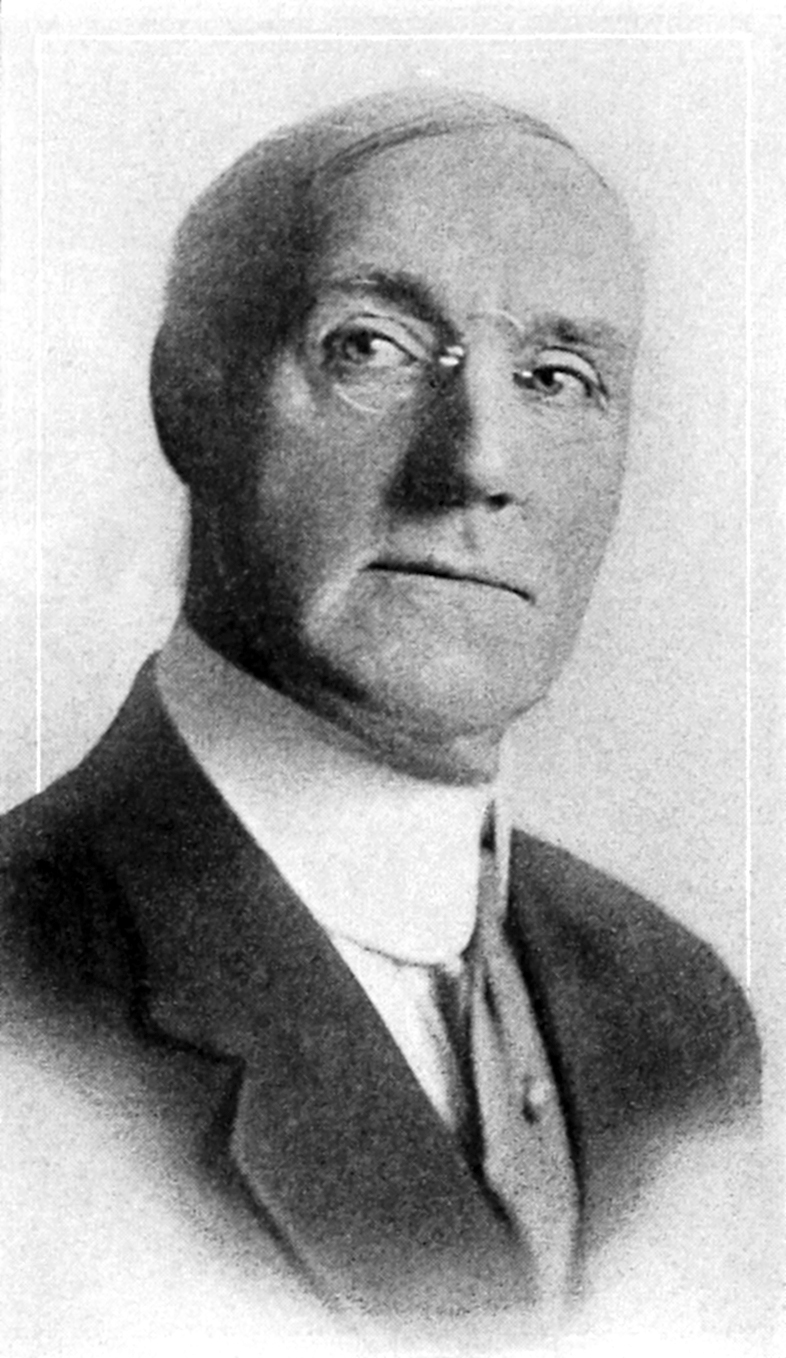
- Ricketts in 1914
- Born: Thomas B. Ricketts; 15 January 1853; Greenwich, London, England
- Died: 19 January 1939 (aged 86); Hollywood, California, U.S.
- Resting place: Hollywood Forever Cemetery
- Occupations: Actor; Director
- Years active: 1882–1939
- Spouse: Josephine Ditt

Thomas B. Ricketts (15 January 1853 – 19 January 1939) was an English-born American stage and film actor and director who was a pioneer in the film industry. He portrayed Ebenezer Scrooge in the first American film adaptation of A Christmas Carol (1908), and directed one of the first motion pictures ever made in Hollywood. After directing scores of silent films, including the first film to be released by Universal Pictures, Ricketts became a prominent character actor.

== Biography ==
Thomas B. Ricketts was born in Greenwich, London 15 January 1853, the son of Rosa (née Penniall) and Robert Ricketts. His father was a painter and when Thomas was 17 years old he emigrated to the United States, and initially worked as a painter himself. However he soon moved into acting in the theatre and directed plays on Broadway for Charles Frohman. He was a stage manager for the Shubert family, sang baritone with the Carleton Opera Company, and starred in his own play, Henri Duvar.

In 1906, after he had been with the Shuberts for four years, Ricketts was persuaded by a friend to join Essanay Studios in Chicago. He played Scrooge in A Christmas Carol (1908), the first American film adaption of the Dickens classic, then starred in The Old Curiosity Shop (1909). When Ricketts said he had toured with a comedy he had written, A Cure for Gout, the company asked him to make a 600-foot film of it—the length limit for a comedy at that time.

Ricketts became a director, taking over comedies and melodramas from Broncho Billy Anderson, who in turn took over Westerns. Ethel Clayton, Jack Conway, J. Warren Kerrigan and Bryant Washburn were among Ricketts's discoveries—along with Josephine Ditt, "the best-dressed woman on the screen", to whom Ricketts was married. Chief dramatic and general producer for two years at Essanay, he helped organize the American Film Manufacturing Company in 1910. He made six films for the Flying "A" before withdrawing and seeking another opportunity.

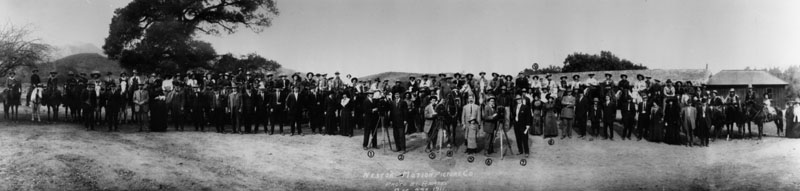

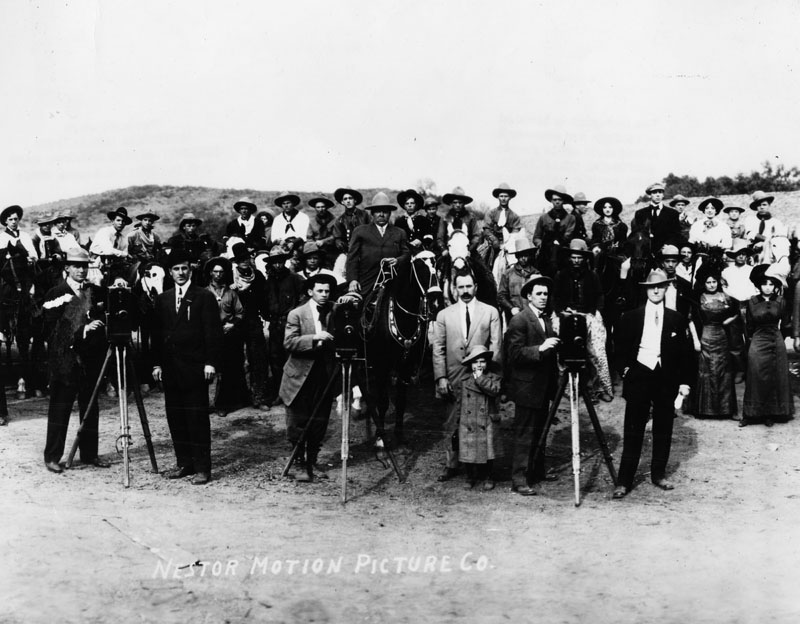
Ricketts (front row, right) in group photograph of the Nestor Motion Picture Company, 1911

In 1911 Ricketts moved to California, together with Canadian film pioneer Al Christie, with thoughts of creating a new film company. "We arrived in Los Angeles with no idea of where to establish our studio," Ricketts remembered. "A real estate man who happened to overhear our discussion of a studio site suggested Hollywood. The next day we found our way out to Sunset and Gower, to a defunct roadhouse. The owner, a woman, wanted $60 a month rent for the entire block. We thought it was too much, but we signed a lease." The Nestor Film Company opened its studio October 27, 1911.

Ricketts directed one of the first Hollywood-made motion pictures, The Best Man Wins (1911), photographed by Charles Rosher. (Note: The Best Man Wins is a romantic comedy filmed in October and released December 25, 1911, promoted as a Christmas release. It is sometimes called the first Hollywood film. Also laying claim to that distinction is The Law of the Range, a Western directed by Nestor's Milton H. Fahrney that was released December 13, 1911.) Its stars were juvenile leading man Harold Lockwood, ingenue Dorothy Davenport, vamp Josephine Ditt, juvenile ingenue Victoria Forde, male heavy Gordon Sackville, and character actresses Eugenie Forde and Alice Davenport. Allan Dwan was Ricketts's assistant.

Nestor made between 50 and 60 films—half of them directed by Ricketts—over the next 18 months. On May 20, 1912, the company merged with the Universal Film Manufacturing Company, Nestor's distributor beginning with The Dawn of Netta (1912), directed by Ricketts.

In 1914, on an independent contract, Ricketts directed Richard Bennett in Damaged Goods back at American. When flower girls were needed for a wedding scene, Bennett's three daughters—Joan Bennett, Constance Bennett and Barbara Bennett—began their film careers. "Its success made me a little egotistical," Ricketts recalled. "It cost about $25,000 to make and brought in a million and a half on its first run. I naturally thought it would put me in great demand as a director. But it didn't. I had to start all over again, this time going back to my old trade as an actor." (Note: As part of its obituary, The New York Times reprinted a North American Newspaper Alliance interview with Thomas Ricketts conducted not long before his death.) However, Ricketts did direct several more feature films for American through 1916, including some with their major romantic team of May Allison and Harold Lockwood such as The Lure of the Mask (1915) and The Other Side of the Door (1916).

Ricketts in After the Thin Man (1936)

Returning to acting in 1919, in his mid-60s, Ricketts was almost always in demand for character parts. By 1935 he was described as "white-haired and bent with age … content with an occasional film role". His later films included Top Hat (1935), After the Thin Man (1936), Pennies from Heaven (1936), The Young in Heart (1938) and Son of Frankenstein (1939). He was regarded as the oldest working actor in Hollywood.

Ricketts died at Hollywood Hospital 19 January 1939, aged 86, of pneumonia, contracted the previous week when he went to work at Universal Studios despite a cold. "Mr. Ricketts left no funds," reported The New York Times, "and expenses of his funeral will be paid by the Motion Picture Relief Society." Josephine Ricketts, hospitalized in Santa Monica since suffering a stroke at Christmas, was not informed of her husband's death; it was reported that she would be told sometime before his funeral. Ricketts was buried in an unmarked grave at Hollywood Forever Cemetery.

== Select filmography ==
=== Director ===
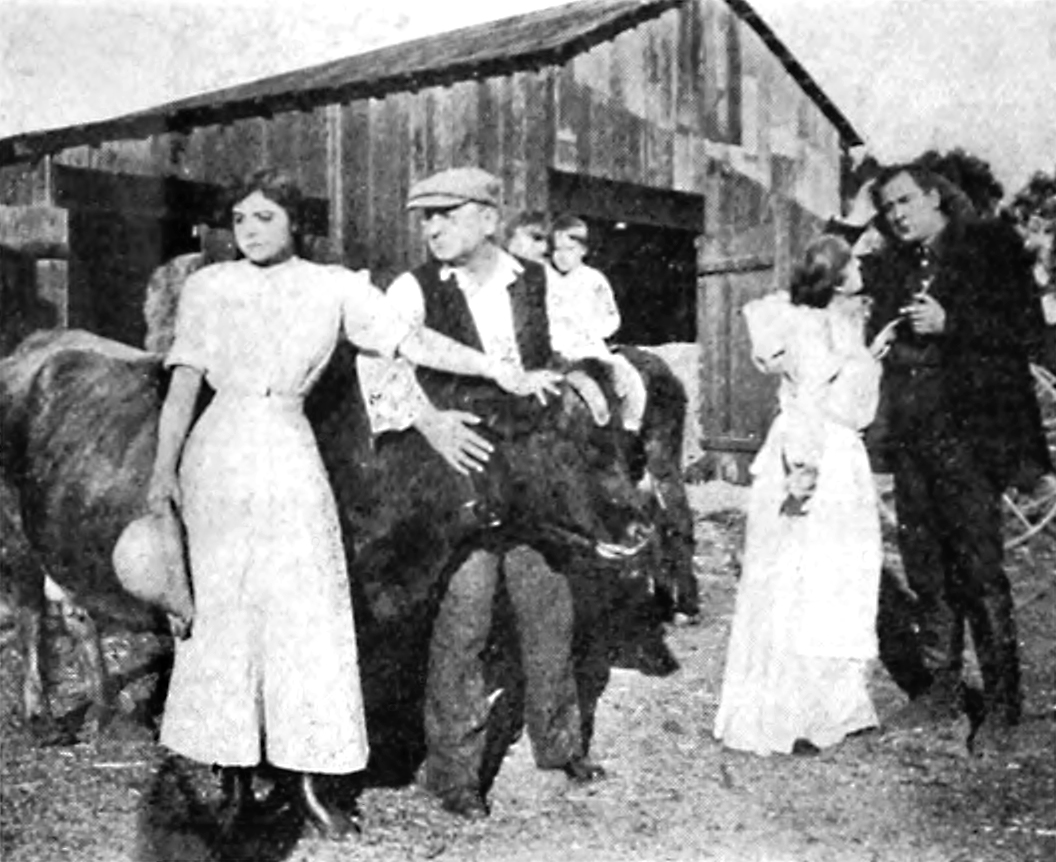
Still from The Best Man Wins (1911)

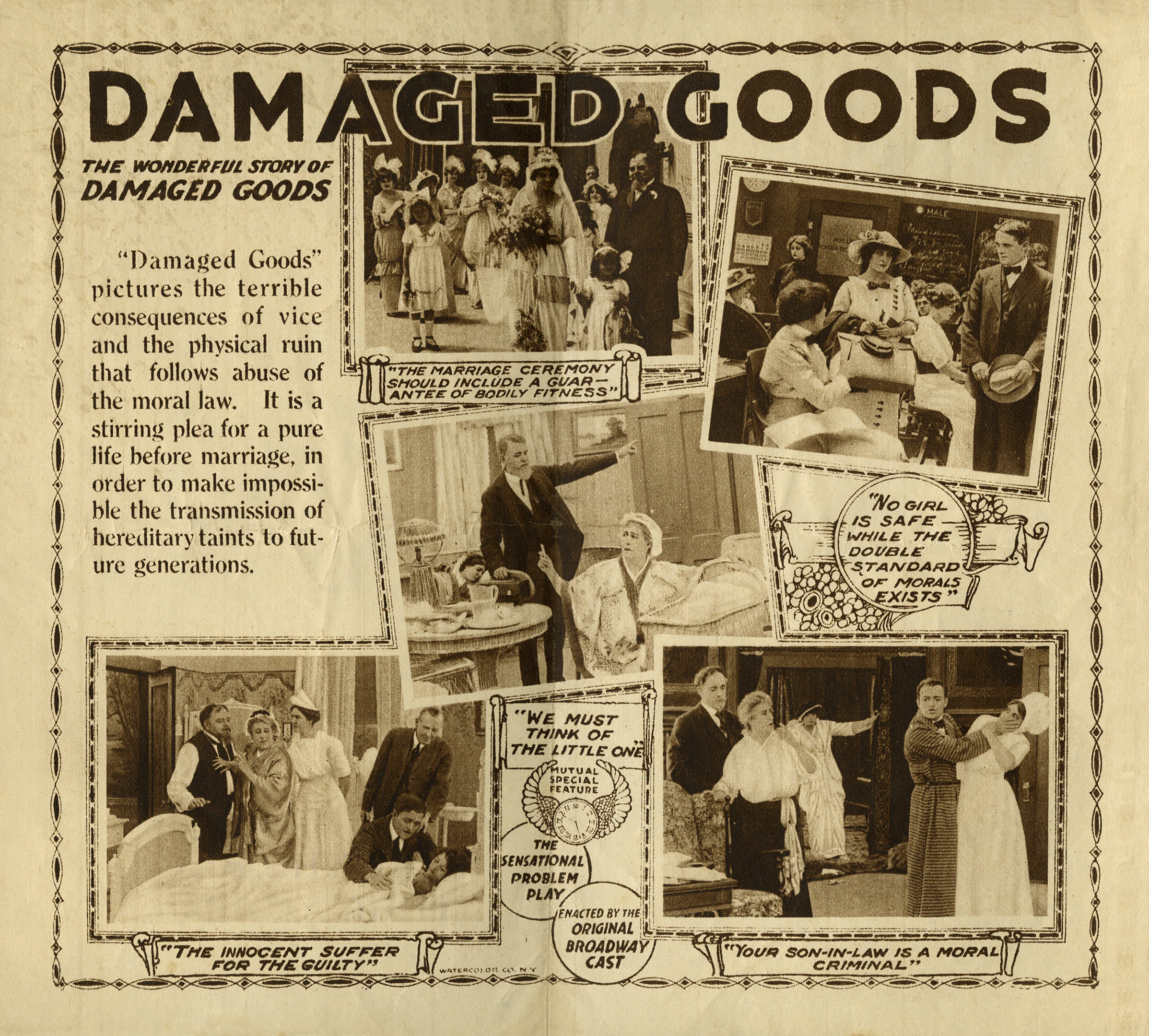
Herald for Damaged Goods (1914)

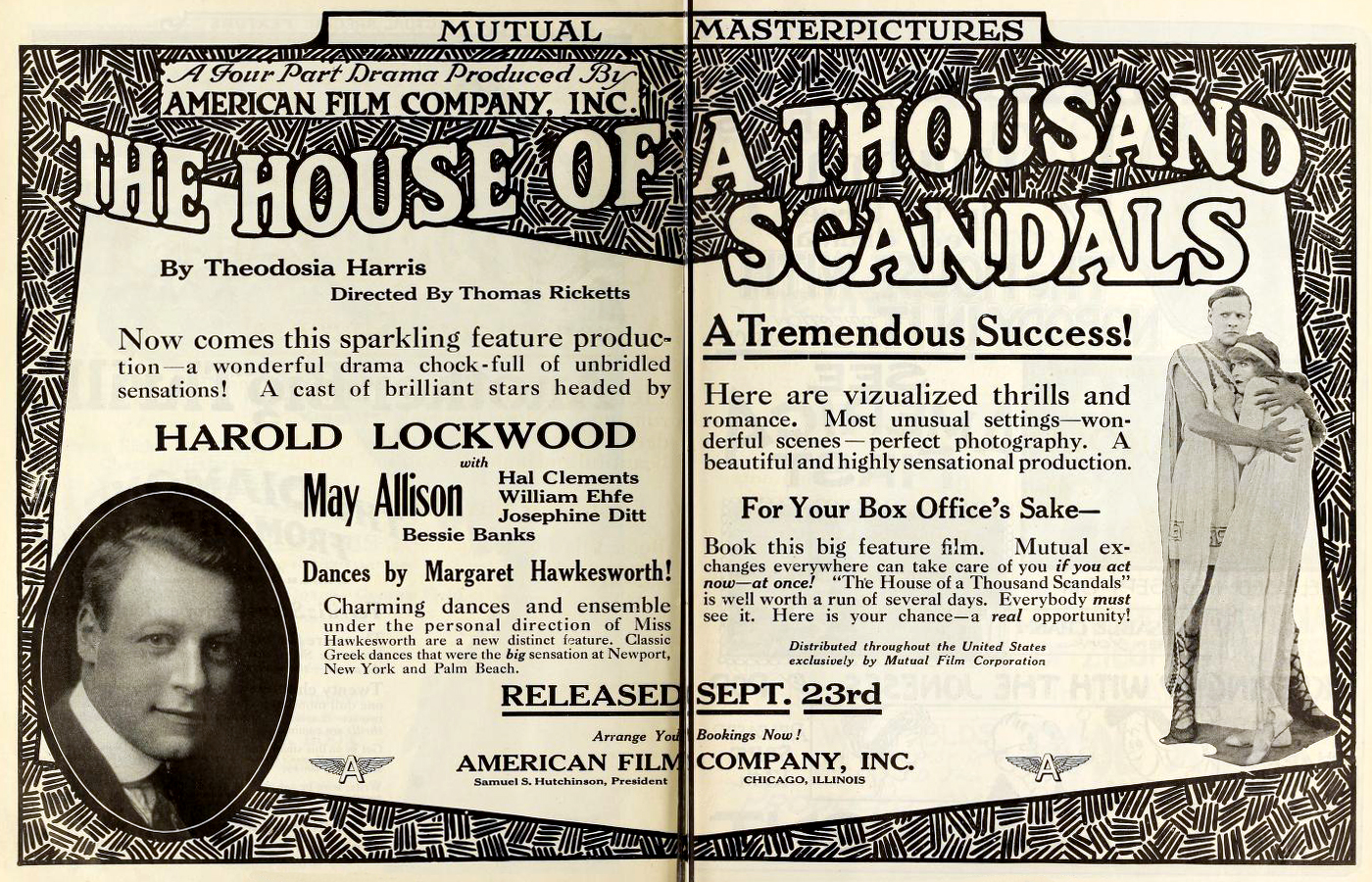
Promotion for The House of a Thousand Scandals in Reel Life, 1915

Year	Title	Notes
1909	A Cure for Gout	
1909	The Game	
1909	Gratitude	
1909	Justified	
1909	Maud Muller	
1909	A Woman's Wit	
1910	The Adventuress	
1910	An Advertisement Answered	
1910	A Fair Exchange	
1910	The Hand of Uncle Sam	
1910	His Only Child	
1910	The Lure of the City	
1910	The Stolen Fortune	
1910	The Thief	
1910	Vera, the Gypsy Girl	
1911	The Best Man Wins	First motion picture made in Hollywood
1912	The Dawn of Netta	First film distributed by Universal Pictures
1914	Damaged Goods	
1915	The Buzzard's Shadow	
1915	The House of a Thousand Scandals	
1915	The End of the Road	
1915	The Lure of the Mask	
1915	Secretary of Frivolous Affairs	
1915	The Wily Chaperon	
1916	The Other Side of the Door	
1916	The Single Code	
1916	Secret Marriage	
1918	The Crime of the Hour	

=== Actor ===
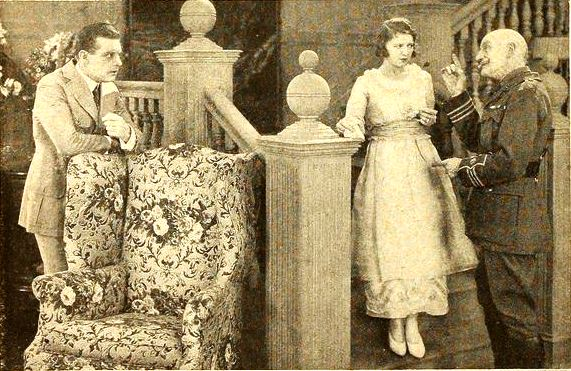
Forrest Stanley, Vivian Martin and Ricketts in His Official Fiancée (1919)

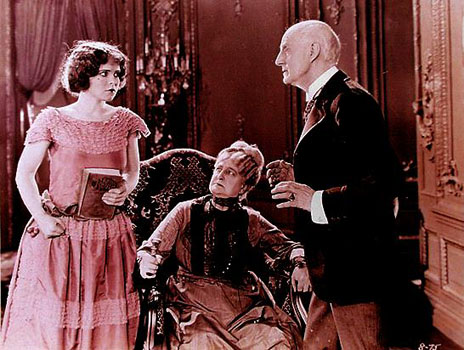
Clara Bow, Kate Lester and Ricketts in Black Oxen (1923)

Year	Title	Role	Notes
1908	A Christmas Carol	Ebenezer Scrooge	
1909	The Old Curiosity Shop		
1919	Girls	Mr. Dennett	
1919	His Official Fiancée	Major Montressor	
1919	Please Get Married	Dr. Jenkins	
1920	All of a Sudden Peggy	Major Archie Phipps	
1920	The Desperate Hero	Butler	
1920	The Great Lover	Potter	
1920	The Paliser Case	Major Archie Phipps	
1920	The Parish Priest	Dr. Thomas Cassidy	
1920	The Spenders	Mr. Milbrey	
1920	The Willow Tree	The Priest	
1921	Beating the Game	Jules Fanchette	
1922	The Killer	Tim Westmore	
1921	Sham	Uncle James	
1922	The Eternal Flame	Vidame de Pameir	
1922	Fools of Fortune	Milton DePuyster	
1922	The Lavender Bath Lady	Simon Gregory	
1922	Putting It Over	Arnold Norton	
1922	Shattered Idols	The Reverend Doctor Romney	
1922	A Tailor-Made Man	Anton Huber	
1923	Alice Adams	J. A. Lamb	
1923	Black Oxen	Charles Dinwiddie	
1923	The Dangerous Maid	John Standish Lane	
1923	Strangers of the Night	Lush	
1923	Within the Law	General Hastings	
1924	Cheap Kisses	The Old Man	
1924	Circe the Enchantress	Archibald Crumm	
1924	The Gaiety Girl	His Grace, the Duke	
1925	Bobbed Hair	Mr. Brewster	
1925	The Business of Love	Noah Burgess	
1925	The Fate of a Flirt	Uncle John Burgess	
1925	A Fight to the Finish	Cyrus J. Davis	
1925	The Girl Who Wouldn't Work	The Rounder	
1925	My Wife and I	Valet	
1925	Never the Twain Shall Meet	Andrew J. Casson	
1925	Oh Doctor!	Mr. Peck	
1925	The Price of Success	Peter Van Teyne	
1925	Sealed Lips	Joseph Howard	
1925	Secrets of the Night	Jerry Hammond	
1925	Steppin' Out	Henry Brodman	
1925	Wages for Wives	Judge McLean	
1925	Was It Bigamy?	Judge Gaynor	
1925	When Husbands Flirt	Wilbur Belcher	
1926	The Belle of Broadway		
1926	The Cat's Pajamas	Mr. Briggs	
1926	Dancing Days	Stubbins	
1926	Going the Limit	Mortimer Harden	
1926	Ladies at Play	Deacon Ezra Boody	
1926	Ladies of Leisure	Wadleigh	
1926	The Lily	Jean	
1926	Love's Blindness	Marquis of Hurlshire	
1926	The Nutcracker	Isaac Totten	
1926	The Old Soak	Roué	
1926	Poker Faces	Henry Curlew	
1926	Stranded in Paris	Herr Rederson	
1926	When the Wife's Away		
1927	Broadway Madness	Lawrence Compton	
1927	Children of Divorce	Secretary	
1927	In a Moment of Temptation	Timothy Gage	
1927	My Friend from India	Judge Belmore	
1927	A Sailor's Sweetheart	Professor Meekham	
1927	Too Many Crooks	Butler	
1927	Venus of Venice	Bride's father	
1928	Dry Martini	Joseph	
1928	Five and Ten Cent Annie	Adam Peck	
1928	Freedom of the Press	Wicks	
1928	Interference	Charles Smith	
1928	Just Married	Makepeace Witter	
1928	The Law and the Man	Quintus Newton	
1929	The Glad Rag Doll	Admiral	
1929	Light Fingers	Edward Madison	
1929	Red Hot Speed		
1930	Prince of Diamonds	Williams	
1930	Sea Legs	Commander	
1930	The Vagabond King	Astrologer	
1931	Ambassador Bill	Littleton	
1931	Man of the World	Mr. Bradkin	
1931	Side Show	Tom Allison	
1931	Surrender	Gottlieb	
1932	A Farewell to Arms	Count Greffi	
1932	He Learned About Women		
1932	Love Bound	The Baron	
1932	If I Had a Million	Guest at Mrs. Walker's dance	
1932	Stepping Sisters	"Stock Market"	
1932	Thrill of Youth	Grandpa Thayer	
1933	The Eleventh Commandment	Henry	
1933	Forgotten	Old crony	
1933	Good-bye Love	Alimony jail inmate	
1933	Mama Loves Papa	Mr. Pierrepont	
1933	The Power and the Glory		
1933	Secret Sinners	Pop, the stage doorman	
1933	Women Won't Tell		
1934	Broadway Bill	Johnson	
1934	The Count of Monte Cristo	Cockeye	
1934	The Curtain Falls	Hotel manager	
1934	In Love with Life	Bookstore proprietor	
1934	Forsaking All Others	Wiffens	
1934	Friends of Mr. Sweeney	Old gentleman	
1934	It Happened One Night	Prissy old man	
1934	The Man Who Reclaimed His Head	Curly	
1934	Manhattan Love Song	Rich man	
1934	No Greater Glory	Old janitor	
1934	One More River	Barrister and clerk	
1934	Pursued	Tourist	
1934	Sons of Steel	Williams	
1934	Springtime for Henry	Bookstore clerk	
1934	Stolen Sweets	Stoner	
1934	Viva Villa!	Grandee	
1934	Whom the Gods Destroy	Charlie	
1935	Clive of India	Old member	
1935	Cardinal Richelieu	Agitator	
1935	Escapade	Old dandy	
1935	George White's 1935 Scandals	Old man	
1935	Goin' to Town	Eligible bachelor	
1935	The Great Impersonation	Villager	
1935	Hi, Gaucho!	Don Salvador	
1935	Let's Live Tonight	Millionaire	
1935	Music Is Magic	Dancer, elderly man	
1935	Now or Never		
1935	The Public Menace	Old man	
1935	A Tale of Two Cities	Tellson, Jr.	
1935	Top Hat	Thackeray Club waiter	
1935	Vagabond Lady	Department head	
1936	The Case Against Mrs. Ames	Juryman	
1936	The Crime of Dr. Forbes	Faculty doctor	
1936	Daniel Boone	Attorney General's associate	
1936	Show Boat	Minister	
1936	Gold Diggers of 1937	Reginald	
1936	Little Lord Fauntleroy	Partygoer	
1936	Gentle Julia	Old man at dance	
1936	Human Cargo	Reporter	
1936	After the Thin Man	Henry, the butler	
1936	To Mary - with Love	Waiter	
1936	More Than a Secretary	Henry	
1936	Pennies from Heaven	Mr. Briggs	
1936	Song and Dance Man	Old theatrical couple	
1936	We Went to College	Pop	
1937	Born Reckless	Patient	
1937	Maid of Salem	Giles Cory	
1937	A Star Is Born	Servant	
1937	The Lady Escapes	Uncle George	
1937	The Prince and the Pauper	Sexton	
1937	The Toast of New York	Member of the board of directors	
1937	Personal Property	Elderly man	
1937	Parnell	Elderly man	
1937	Rhythm in the Clouds	Winter	
1938	The Young in Heart	Andrew	
1938	Bluebeard's Eighth Wife	Uncle Andre	
1938	The Baroness and the Butler	Old man	
1938	Young Fugitives	Tom Riggins	
1938	Gateway	Old man	
1938	Four Men and a Prayer	Station master	
1939	Son of Frankenstein	Burgher	
