= The Glimpses of the Moon (Wharton novel) =

1922 novel by Edith Wharton

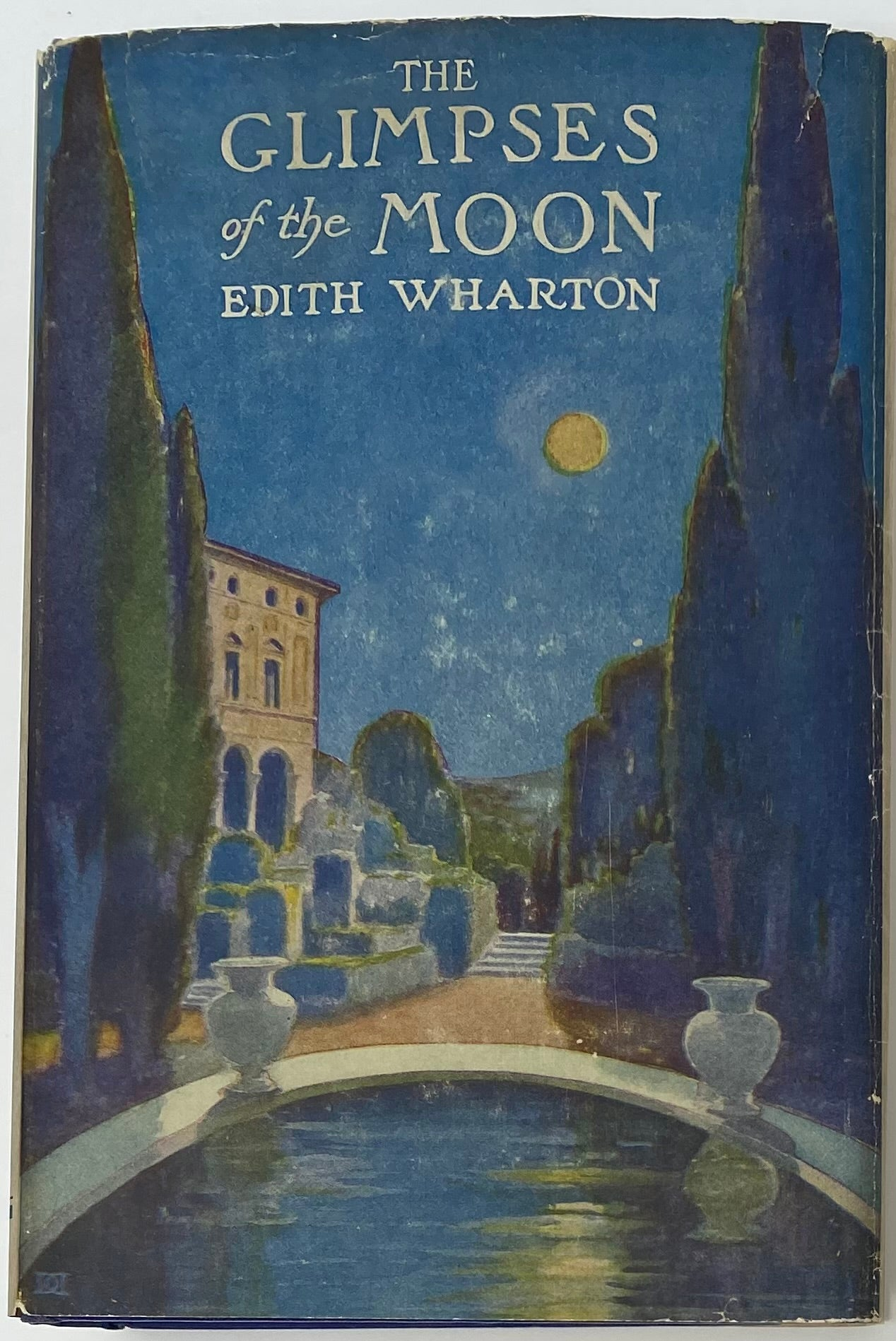
Cover for the first edition

The Glimpses of the Moon is a 1922 novel by Edith Wharton. The novel has been compared with The House of Mirth (1905) and explores concepts including marriage in the United States.

== Publication ==
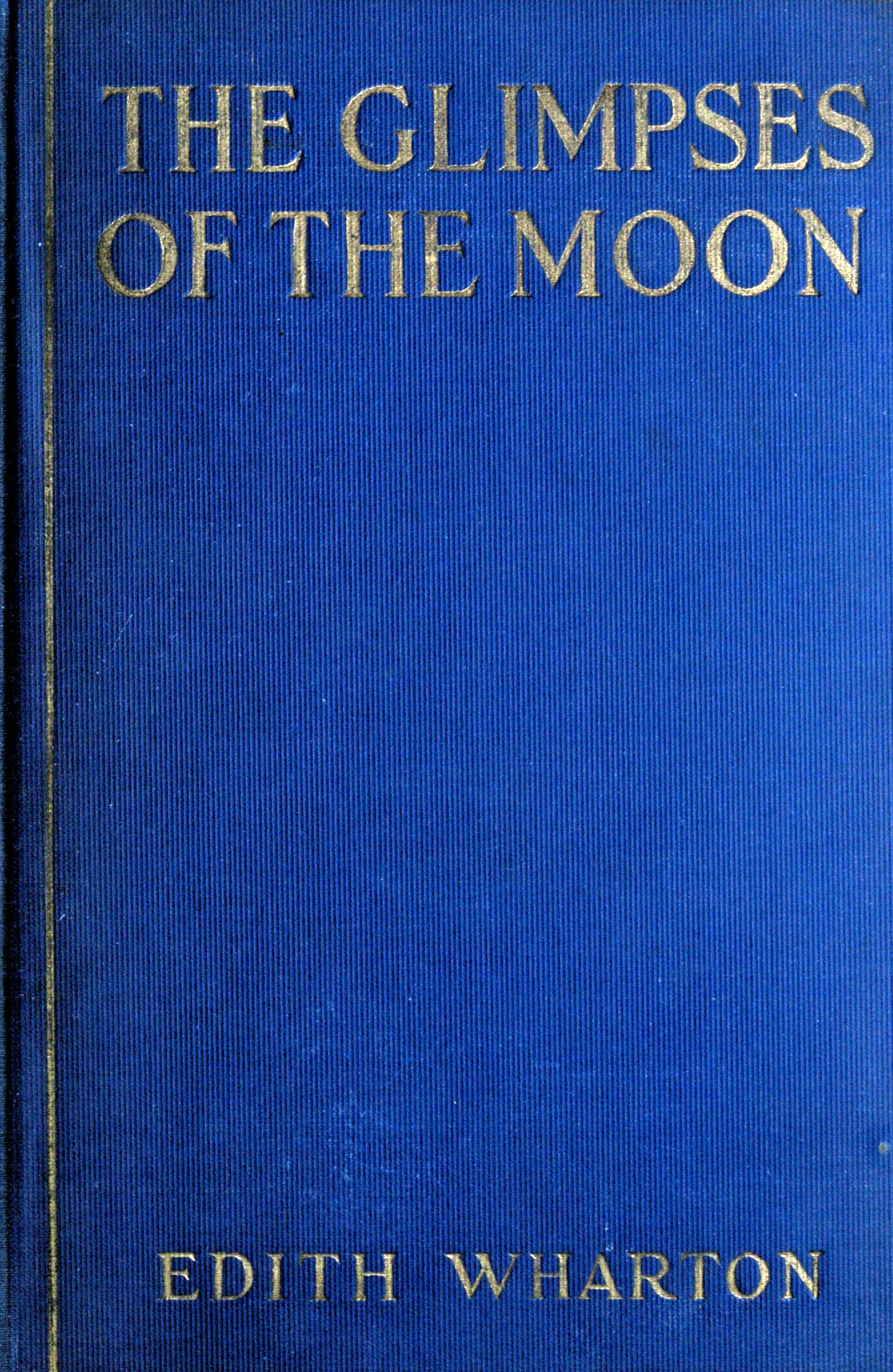
Interior cover

The novel was published in 1922 and reviewed for the October 1922 edition of The Atlantic Monthly by Wilson Follett.

== Film adaptations ==
The Glimpses of the Moon was made into a silent film of the same name in 1923 which is now lost.

In 2024, Francis Ford Coppola announced he was set to direct a musical adaptation of the novel.

== Trivia ==
The title comes from Hamlet (I.iv). The novel is in the public domain and available on Wikisource.

== See also ==
- 1920s
- 1922 in literature
- The Age of Innocence (1920)
- American literature
