= Gertrude Chorre =

American actress

- Gertrude Chorre, from the 1938 film, Flaming Frontiers
- Born: Gertrude Martinez; April 30, 1885; La Jolla Indian Reservation, California
- Died: September 3, 1972 (aged 87); Riverside, California
- Occupations: Actress, talent scout

Gertrude Chorre (April 30, 1885 – September 3, 1972) was an American film actress and talent scout based in southern California.

== Early life ==
Gertrude Martinez was born in southern California, to Estefano Martinez (1824–1902) and Regina Guassac (1858–1905). She was an enrolled member of the La Jolla Band of Luiseno Indians, and a fluent speaker of Luiseño. The Guassac family was described as a "pioneering cattle raising family"; artist Fritz Scholder was her great-nephew.

== Career ==
Chorre appeared in films from the 1920s to the 1950s, including credits in In Old California (1929) and Frozen Justice (1929). She was often in small roles in Westerns, including appearances in War Paint (1926), Western Frontier (1935), The Outlaw Tamer (1935), Call of the Wild (1935), Lawless Riders (1935), Ramona (1936), A Tenderfoot Goes West (1936), Rio Grande Ranger (1936), Join the Marines (1937), Flaming Frontiers (1938), Hawk of the Wilderness (1938), Murder on the Yukon (1940), Navajo Kid (1945), The Sea of Grass (1947), We Were Strangers (1949), The Traveling Salesman (1950), Raw Edge (1956), and The First Traveling Saleslady (1956). On television she made an uncredited appearance in The Adventures of Rin Tin Tin (1958).

Chorre was said to be "a capable scout", rounding up other Native American actors for background work on Hollywood productions, sometimes with Jim Thorpe. "Between them these two know the addresses of all the Indians hereabout who work from time to time in pictures," noted a 1936 report. She sometimes worked with her children in films. Late in life, she assisted French linguist André Malécot with language studies. "She loved to regale you with stories of her people," he recalled. "She and her sister and a few others were the few who still spoke the language fluently back then." She was also active in the American Indian Woman's Club in Los Angeles.

== Personal life ==
Gertrude Martinez married Andres Moro (or Morrow); her second husband was butcher Joseph C. Chorre (1890–1958), an alumnus of the Sherman Institute. She had several children, including Marie (1919–1989), who appeared in White Fang (1936), Bennie, who appeared in Boys Town, and Joseph, known as "Sonny" (1914–1987), who was later known as wrestler Suni War Cloud. Gertrude Chorre died in 1972, in Riverside, California, aged 87 years. Her gravesite is in Woodlawn Memorial Cemetery in Santa Monica.
