= The Glimpses of the Moon (film) =

1923 film by Allan Dwan

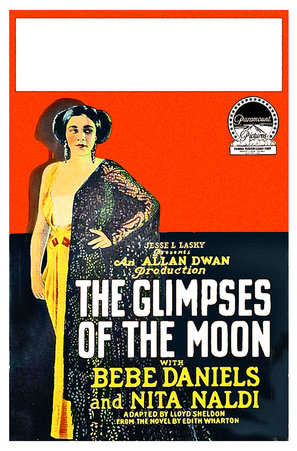
- Theatrical poster
- Directed by: Allan Dwan
- Written by: E. Lloyd Sheldon (scenario); Edfrid Bingham (scenario)
- Based on: The Glimpses of the Moon by Edith Wharton
- Produced by: Adolph Zukor; Jesse Lasky
- Cinematography: Harold Rosson (as Hal Rosson)
- Distributed by: Paramount Pictures
- Release date: March 25, 1923
- Running time: 70 minutes; 7 reels (6,502 feet)
- Country: United States
- Language: Silent (English intertitles)

The Glimpses of the Moon is a 1923 lost film. An American silent drama film, it was directed by Allan Dwan and starred Bebe Daniels. It was produced by Famous Players–Lasky and distributed by Paramount Pictures. The film is based upon the 1922 Edith Wharton novel The Glimpses of the Moon.

== Cast ==
- Bebe Daniels as Susan Branch
- David Powell as Nick Lansing
- Nita Naldi as Ursula Gillow
- Maurice Costello as Fred Gillow
- Rubye De Remer as Mrs. Ellie Vanderlyn
- Billy Quirk as Bob Fulmer (credited as William Quirk)
- Charles K. Gerrard as Streffy, Lord Altringham
- Pearl Sindelar as Grace Fullmer
- Mrs. George Peggram
- Beth Allen
- Dolores Costello
- Millie Muller
- Beatrice Coburn
- Fred Hadley

== Preservation ==
The Glimpses of the Moon is a lost film.

== See also ==
- List of lost films
