= Wife Wanted (1915 film) =

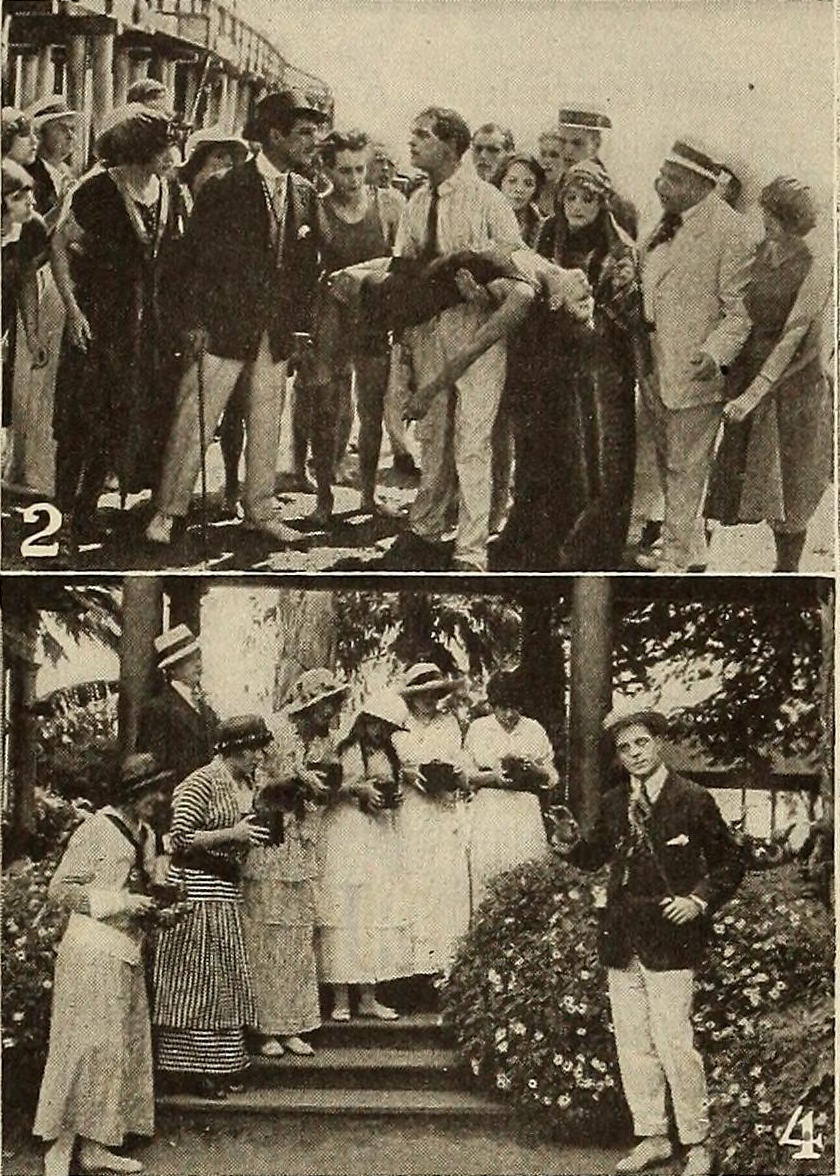
- Ed Coxen, Winifred Greenwood, John Steppling, and George Field in publicity stills
- Directed by: Henry Otto
- Starring: Ed Coxen; Winifred Greenwood; John Steppling
- Distributed by: Mutual Film
- Release date: April 28, 1915
- Country: United States
- Languages: Silent film English intertitles

Wife Wanted (also known as Wanted - A Wife) is a 1915 American silent short comedy-drama film directed by Henry Otto starring Ed Coxen, John Steppling, and Winifred Greenwood.

== Cast ==
- Ed Coxen as Andy Fortune
- Winifred Greenwood as Ruth Moore
- John Steppling as J.D.P. Moore
- George Field as Count Raphio
- William Bertram
- Charlotte Burton
