= The Beggar Child =

- Directed by: Henry Otto; William Desmond Taylor
- Written by: Bessie Banks
- Starring: Ed Coxen; John Steppling; Winifred Greenwood
- Production company: American Film Manufacturing Company
- Distributed by: Mutual Film
- Release date: November 30, 1914
- Running time: 1 reel
- Country: United States
- Languages: Silent film English intertitles

The Beggar Child is a 1914 American silent short film directed by William Desmond Taylor, starring Ed Coxen, John Steppling, and Winifred Greenwood.

== Cast ==
- Ed Coxen as Hugo, an artist
- Winifred Greenwood as Lycia, a child model
- John Steppling as Marco, a peasant
- George Field as Count Roberto
- Charlotte Burton as Rosa, his servant
- King Clark as Dan Street, an art student
