= The Resolve =

- Directed by: Henry Otto
- Written by: Edward Kaufman (story)
- Starring: Ed Coxen; Lizette Thorne; Winifred Greenwood
- Distributed by: Mutual Film
- Release date: May 31, 1915
- Country: United States
- Languages: Silent film English intertitles

The Resolve is a 1915 American silent short drama film directed by Henry Otto starring Ed Coxen, Lizette Thorne, and Winifred Greenwood.

== Cast ==
- Ed Coxen as Steven Brooks
- Lizette Thorne as Mrs. Stephen Brooks
- Winifred Greenwood as Nell
- Charlotte Burton
- George Field
- Lillian Knight
- John Steppling
