= In Tune =

In Tune may refer to:

- In Tune (film), a 1914 American silent film
- In Tune Monthly, an American music magazine
- In Tune (album), a 1971 jazz album by The Oscar Peterson Trio and The Singers Unlimited
- In Tune (radio programme), a BBC Radio 3 music magazine programme
- Microsoft Intune, a data management software

== See also ==
- Musical tuning
- Toyota Entune, a satellite navigation system for Toyota automobiles
