= Wife Wanted =

Wife Wanted may refer to:

- Wife Wanted (1915 film), a 1915 American silent short comedy-drama film
- Wife Wanted (1946 film), an American crime film noir
