= The Third Kiss =

The Third Kiss may refer to:

- The Third Kiss (1942 film), an Argentine romantic drama film
- The Third Kiss (1919 film), an American silent comedy film
