= Grounds for divorce (disambiguation) =

Grounds for divorce are regulations specifying the circumstances under which a person will be granted a divorce.

Grounds for divorce or Grounds for Divorce may also refer to:

- Grounds for divorce (United States), regulations for divorce specific to the United States
- Grounds for Divorce (1925 film), an American comedy silent film
- Grounds for Divorce (1960 film), a West German romantic comedy film
- "Grounds for Divorce" (song), song by band Elbow
