= Mystery Liner =

1934 film by William Nigh

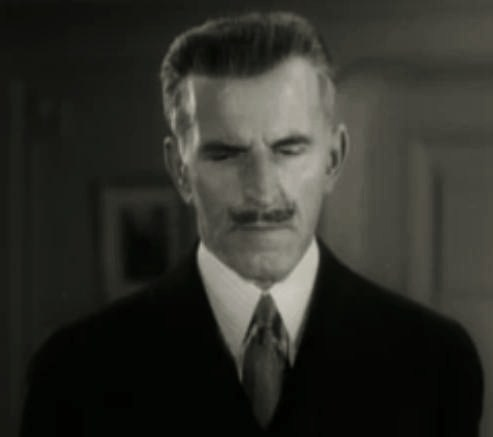
- Gustav von Seyffertitz as Inspector Von Kessling
- Directed by: William Nigh
- Screenplay by: Wellyn Totman
- Based on: "The Ghost of John Holling" (1924 short story) by Edgar Wallace
- Produced by: Paul Malvern
- Cinematography: Archie Stout
- Edited by: Carl Pierson
- Production company: Monogram Pictures
- Distributed by: Monogram Pictures
- Release date: March 15, 1934 (U.S.)
- Running time: 62 minutes
- Country: United States
- Language: English

Mystery Liner is a 1934 American Pre-Code film directed by William Nigh, starring Noah Beery, Sr., and based on an Edgar Wallace story originally published in the Saturday Evening Post in 1924. The film was entered as a feature attraction at the 1934 International Exhibition of Cinematographic Art in Venice, Italy, the forerunner of the Venice Film Festival.

== Plot ==
Captain Holling (Beery) is relieved of command of his ship after he suffers a nervous breakdown. His replacement, Captain Downey (Howard), takes over the liner just as it is about to be used for an experiment in remote control.

Professor Grimson (Lewis) has devised a system for controlling the ship from a land-based laboratory. However, as Grimson demonstrates the system, a rival group is listening in, hoping to use the device for its own purposes.

== Cast ==
Mystery Liner

- Noah Beery as Capt. John Holling
- Astrid Allwyn as Lila Kane
- Edwin Maxwell as Major Pope
- Gustav von Seyffertitz as Inspector Von Kessling
- Ralph Lewis as Prof. Grimson
- Cornelius Keefe as First Officer Cliff Rogers
- Zeffie Tilbury as Granny Plimpton
- Boothe Howard as Capt. Downey
- Howard C. Hickman as Dr. Howard
- Gabby Hayes as Joe, the watchman
- George Cleveland as Simms the Steward

== Critical reception ==
Leonard Maltin called the film an "intriguing but slow-paced B-picture"; while Allmovie called it "a rather nifty little science fiction-thriller/murder mystery from Poverty Row company Monogram ... Typical low-budget fare, Mystery Liner is nevertheless well photographed by Archie Stout and for the most part capably acted"; and TV Guide noted "a fine example of a well-made thriller created on the programmer assembly line...Veteran director William Nigh does a typically professional job with the few resources at his disposal and cinematographer Archie Stout (who would eventually win an Oscar for his work on John Ford's The Quiet Man, 1952) contributes some exceptional camerawork."

== See also ==
- List of films in the public domain in the United States
