= Charles McHugh (actor) =

American actor

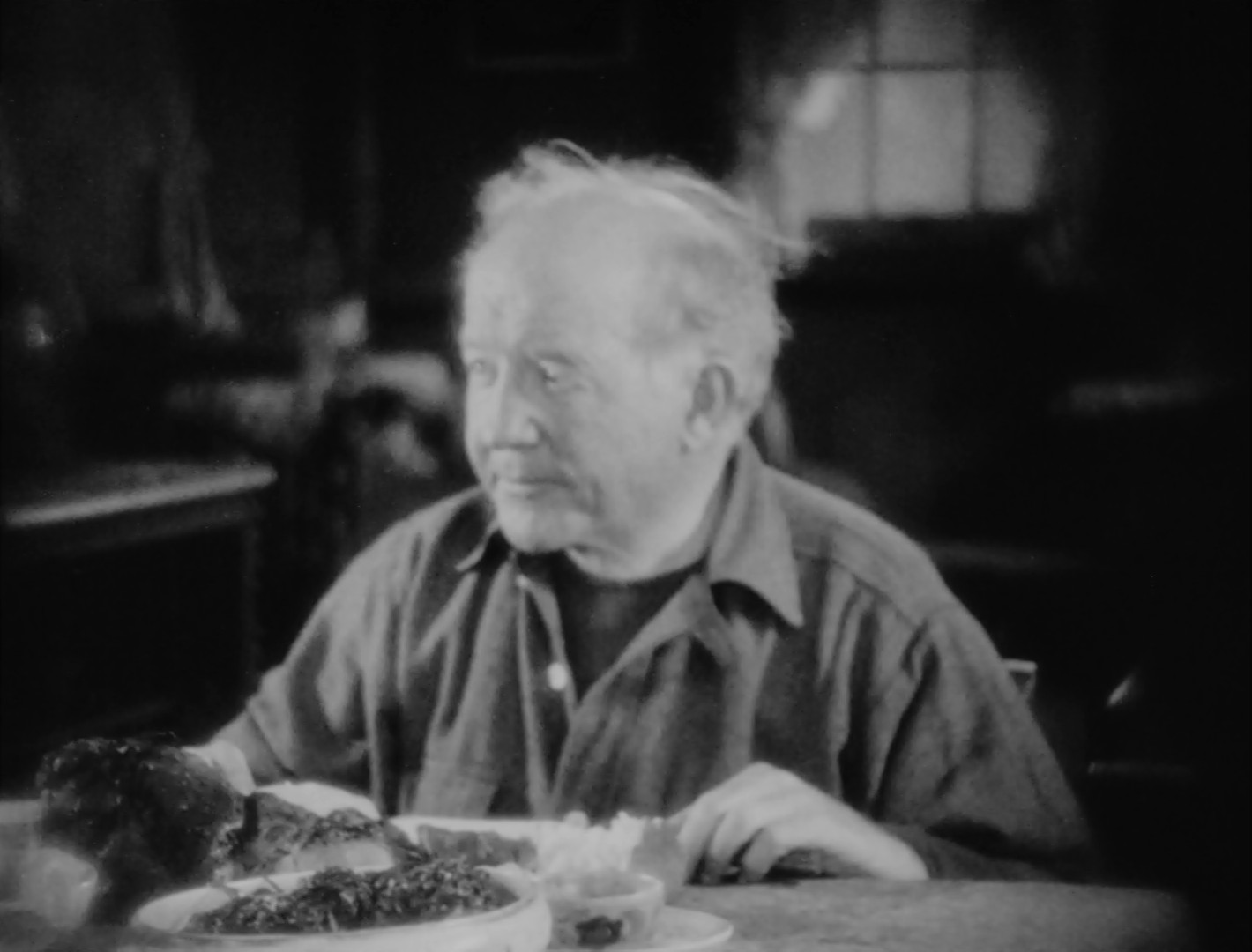
- Charles McHugh in Lights of Old Broadway (1925)
- Born: July 20, 1870; Philadelphia, Pennsylvania, United States
- Died: October 21, 1931 (aged 61); Los Angeles, California, United States
- Occupation: Actor
- Years active: 1917–1929 (film)

Charles McHugh (1870–1931) was an American film actor of the silent era. He frequently played Irish characters in a mixture of comedies and westerns.

== Selected filmography ==
- Down to Earth (1917)
- The Goat (1918)
- Fame and Fortune (1918)
- Rustling a Bride (1919)
- Smiling All the Way (1920)
- La La Lucille (1920)
- Be My Wife (1921)
- A Shocking Night (1921)
- The Beautiful and Damned (1922)
- The Eagle's Feather (1923)
- The Girl of the Golden West (1923)
- Cupid's Fireman (1923)
- Babbitt (1924)
- The Trouble Shooter (1924)
- Brand of Cowardice (1925)
- Smilin' at Trouble (1925)
- The Golden Cocoon (1925)
- Lights of Old Broadway (1925)
- Her Honor, the Governor (1926)
- The Sporting Lover (1926)
- The Waning Sex (1926)
- The Prince of Broadway (1926)
- Finnegan's Ball (1927)
- The Princess from Hoboken (1927)
- Phantom of the Range (1928)
- The Quitter (1929)
- Smiling Irish Eyes (1929)

== Bibliography ==
- Katchmer, George A. A Biographical Dictionary of Silent Film Western Actors and Actresses. McFarland, 2015.
