= Say It with Sables =

1928 film

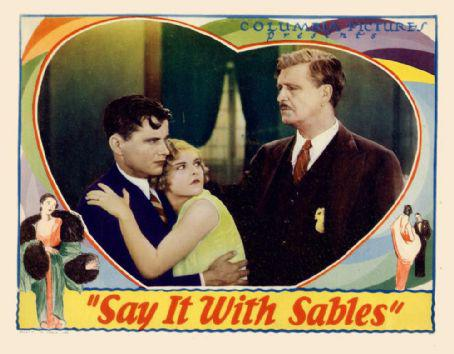
- Directed by: Frank Capra
- Written by: Frank Capra (story); Peter Milne (story); Dorothy Howell
- Produced by: Harry Cohn
- Starring: Francis X. Bushman; Helene Chadwick; Margaret Livingston
- Cinematography: Joseph Walker
- Edited by: Arthur Roberts
- Production company: Columbia Pictures
- Distributed by: Columbia Pictures
- Release date: July 13, 1928
- Running time: 70 minutes
- Country: United States
- Languages: Silent film English language

Say It with Sables is a 1928 American silent drama film directed by Frank Capra and produced by Harry Cohn for Columbia Pictures. Columbia no longer has a negative or print of this film, so the film is considered a lost film. Various film festivals have run a surviving trailer for the film during retrospectives of Capra's work.

== Plot ==
Doug Caswell falls for Irene Gordon. Irene happens to be the mistress of his wealthy father, John Caswell, and it's up to Doug's stepmother, Helen, to put things right.

== Cast ==
- Francis X. Bushman as John Caswell
- Helene Chadwick as Helen Caswell
- Margaret Livingston as Irene Gordon
- Arthur Rankin as Doug Caswell
- Alphonse Ethier as Mitchell (as Alphonz Ethier)
- Edna Mae Cooper as Maid

== See also ==
- List of lost films
