= The Quitter (1929 film) =

1929 film

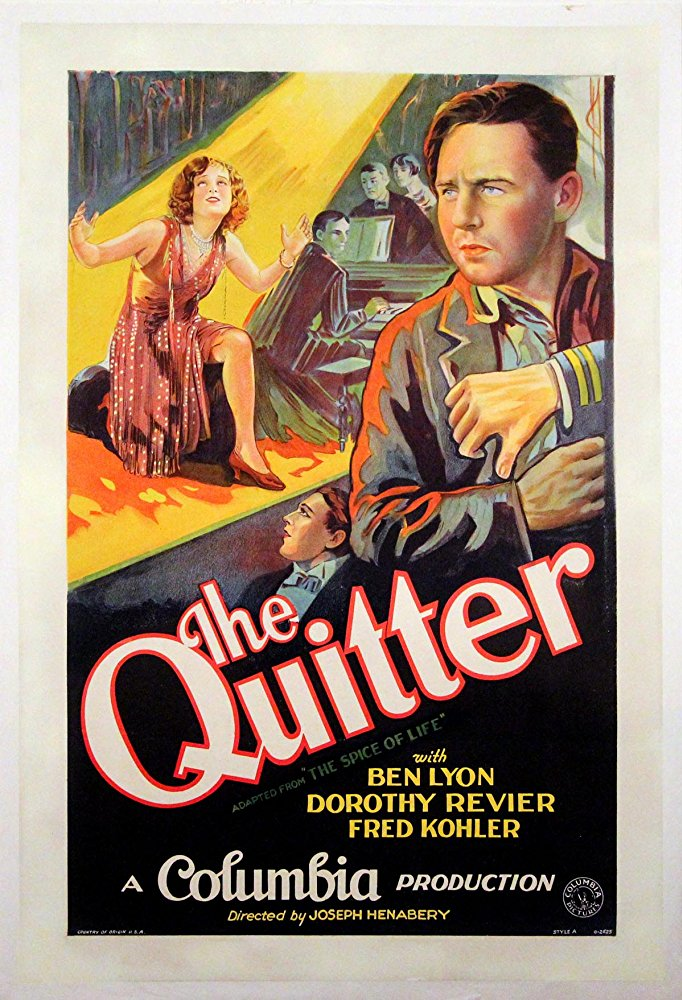
- Directed by: Joseph Henabery
- Written by: Dorothy Howell
- Produced by: Harry Cohn
- Starring: Ben Lyon; Dorothy Revier; Fred Kohler
- Cinematography: Joseph Walker
- Edited by: Arthur Roberts
- Production company: Columbia Pictures
- Distributed by: Columbia Pictures
- Release date: April 1, 1929
- Running time: 60 minutes
- Country: United States
- Language: English

The Quitter is a 1929 silent film from Columbia Pictures directed by Joseph Henabery starring Ben Lyon, Dorothy Revier and Fred Kohler.

== Cast ==
- Ben Lyon as Neal Abbott
- Dorothy Revier as Patricia
- Fred Kohler as Duffy Thompson
- Charles McHugh as Shorty
- Sherry Hall as Nick
- Jacqueline Gadsden as Doris
- Henry Otto as Dr. Abbott
- Claire McDowell as Mrs. Abbott

== Preservation and status ==
A complete copy of the film is held at the EYE Film Institute Netherlands.
