= You Never Saw Such a Girl =

1919 film by Robert G. Vignola

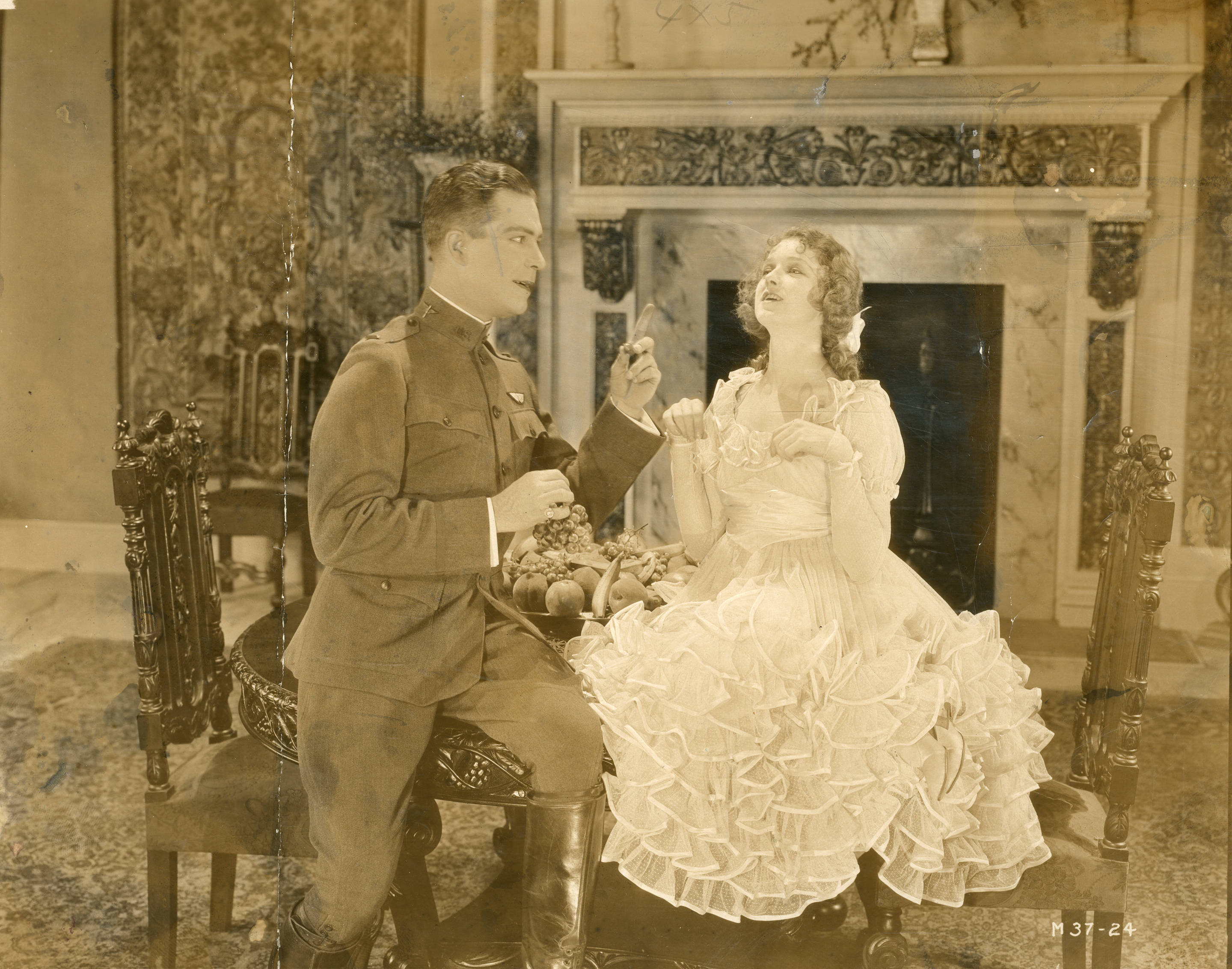
- Still with Harrison Ford and Vivian Martin
- Directed by: Robert G. Vignola
- Screenplay by: Marion Fairfax; George Weston
- Produced by: Jesse L. Lasky
- Starring: Vivian Martin; Harrison Ford; Mayme Kelso; Willis Marks; Edna Mae Cooper; John Burton
- Cinematography: Frank E. Garbutt
- Production company: Famous Players–Lasky Corporation
- Distributed by: Paramount Pictures
- Release date: February 16, 1919
- Running time: 50 minutes
- Country: United States
- Language: Silent (English intertitles)

You Never Saw Such a Girl is a lost 1919 American silent drama film directed by Robert G. Vignola and written by Marion Fairfax and George Weston. The film stars Vivian Martin, Harrison Ford, Mayme Kelso, Willis Marks, Edna Mae Cooper, and John Burton. The film was released on February 16, 1919, by Paramount Pictures.

== Cast ==
- Vivian Martin as Marty McKenzie
- Harrison Ford as Eric Burgess
- Mayme Kelso as Fannie Perkins
- Willis Marks as Uncle Esau
- Edna Mae Cooper as Mrs. McKenzie
- John Burton as Mr. Burgess
- Edythe Chapman as Mrs. Burgess
- Herbert Standing as Judge Eustace
- Gerard Alexander as Mrs. Eustace
- Claire Anderson as Katherine Spencer
- Jim Farley as Reagan
- J. Morris Foster as Gentleman Jack
