= Boots Wall =

American actress

Margaret "Boots" Wall was an American actress on stage and screen. She appeared in silent films from the U.S. She was married to actor David V. Wall and had lead roles in films. She was a prominent player in All-Celtic Comedies.

== Filmography ==
- Tess of the d'Urbervilles (1913), as Reta
- Caprice (1913), as Edith Henderson
- Eph's Dream (1913)
- Uncle Tom's Cabin (1914), as Topsy Goble
- Always in the Way (1915)
- Under Southern Skies (1915) as Margaret Wall
