= The Goat (1918 film) =

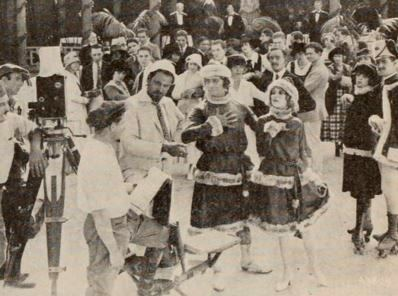
- Still with casting director Clarence Geldart showing Fred Stone as doubling for Rhea Mitchell
- Directed by: Donald Crisp
- Screenplay by: Frances Marion
- Produced by: Jesse L. Lasky
- Starring: Fred Stone; Fanny Midgley; Charles McHugh; Rhea Mitchell; Sylvia Ashton; Philo McCullough; Winifred Greenwood
- Cinematography: Henry Kotani
- Production companies: Artcraft Pictures Corporation; Famous Players–Lasky Corporation
- Distributed by: Paramount Pictures
- Release date: September 29, 1918
- Running time: 50 minutes
- Country: United States
- Language: Silent (English intertitles)

The Goat is a 1918 American silent comedy film directed by Donald Crisp and written by Frances Marion. The film stars Fred Stone, Fanny Midgley, Charles McHugh, Rhea Mitchell, Sylvia Ashton, Philo McCullough, and Winifred Greenwood. The film was released on September 29, 1918, by Paramount Pictures.

== Plot ==
As described in a film magazine, ironworker Chuck McCarthy loves Molly O'Connors, a stenographer for the Filmcraft Studio. While working near an open stage of the studio, Chuck decides to become a motion picture star. He rescues a pet monkey belonging to Bijou Lamour, the leading lady of the company, and is signed to "double" for her in a skating scene. He forgets himself and in another scene whips a half dozen "Germans" in a war film. Finally, he is cast to double for Marmaduke X. Caruthers, who refuses to ride a horse in a western film. Chuck falls off the horse and is badly injured. Caruthers is lionized for his bravery while Chuck is nursed back to health by Molly, and he decides to give up his screen career. He receives a check for $1,000 from the studio and uses it to pay off Molly's mortgage.

== Cast ==
- Fred Stone as Chuck McCarthy
- Fanny Midgley as Mrs. McCarthy
- Charles McHugh as Mr. McCarthy
- Rhea Mitchell as Bijou Lamour
- Sylvia Ashton as The Baby Vampire
- Philo McCullough as Marmaduke X. Caruthers
- Winifred Greenwood as Molly O'Connors
- Charles Stanton Ogle as Director Graham
- Ernest Joy as Studio Manager
- Clarence Geldart as Casting Director
