= When a Woman Waits =

- Directed by: Henry Otto
- Starring: Ed Coxen; George Field; Winifred Greenwood
- Distributed by: Mutual Film
- Release date: December 28, 1914
- Running time: Two reels
- Country: United States
- Languages: Silent film English intertitles

When a Woman Waits is a 1914 American silent short drama film directed by Henry Otto starring Ed Coxen, George Field, and Winifred Greenwood.

== Plot ==
The film follows a woman's life from age 18 through middle age after she gives up her own happiness to help out her family.

== Cast ==
- Ed Coxen as Ben Hewitt
- George Field as Jack Lane
- Winifred Greenwood as Agnes Graham
- Charlotte Burton as Mabel Graham
- John Steppling as Mr. Graham
- Bessie Banks as Mrs. Graham
- William Bertram as Minister
- Miss Davis as Jessie Graham
- Ursula Holt as Jessie at age 11
- Bert Hatmer as Jimmie Graham
- Byron Thornberg as Jimmie at age 11
