= Sick Abed =

1920 film by Sam Wood

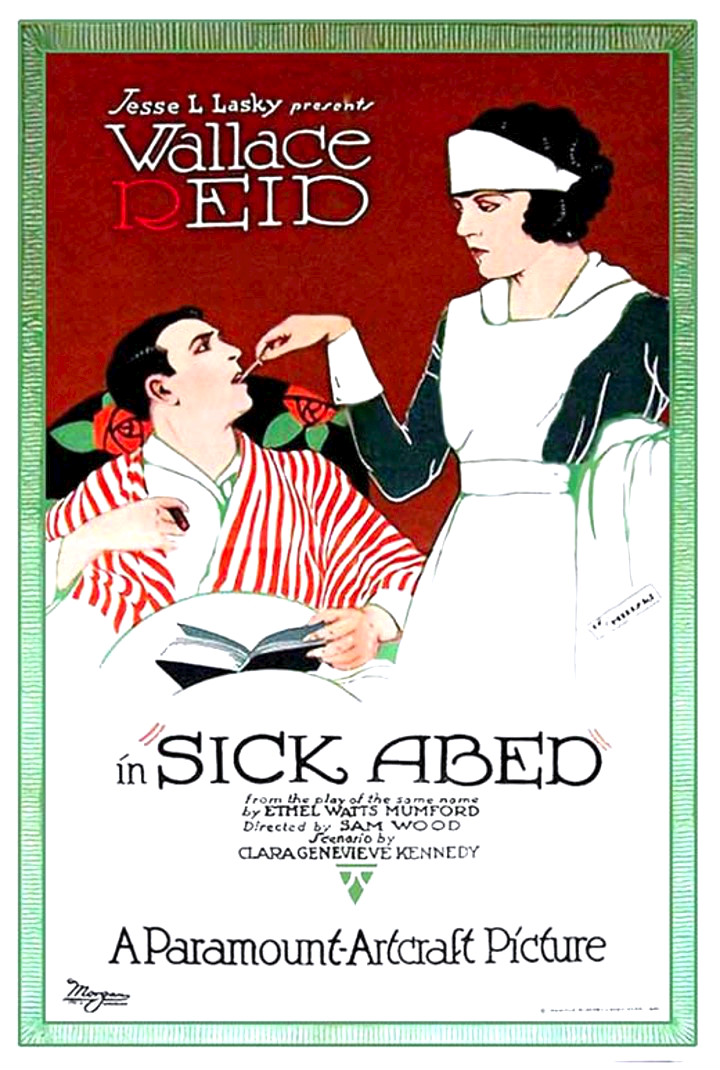
- 1920 theatrical poster
- Directed by: Sam Wood
- Written by: Clara Genevieve Kennedy (scenario)
- Based on: Sick-a-bed by Ethel Watts Mumford
- Produced by: Adolph Zukor; Jesse L. Lasky
- Starring: Wallace Reid; Bebe Daniels
- Cinematography: Alfred Gilks
- Distributed by: Paramount Pictures/Artcraft
- Release date: June 27, 1920
- Running time: 5 reels; 4,327 feet
- Country: United States
- Language: Silent (English intertitles)

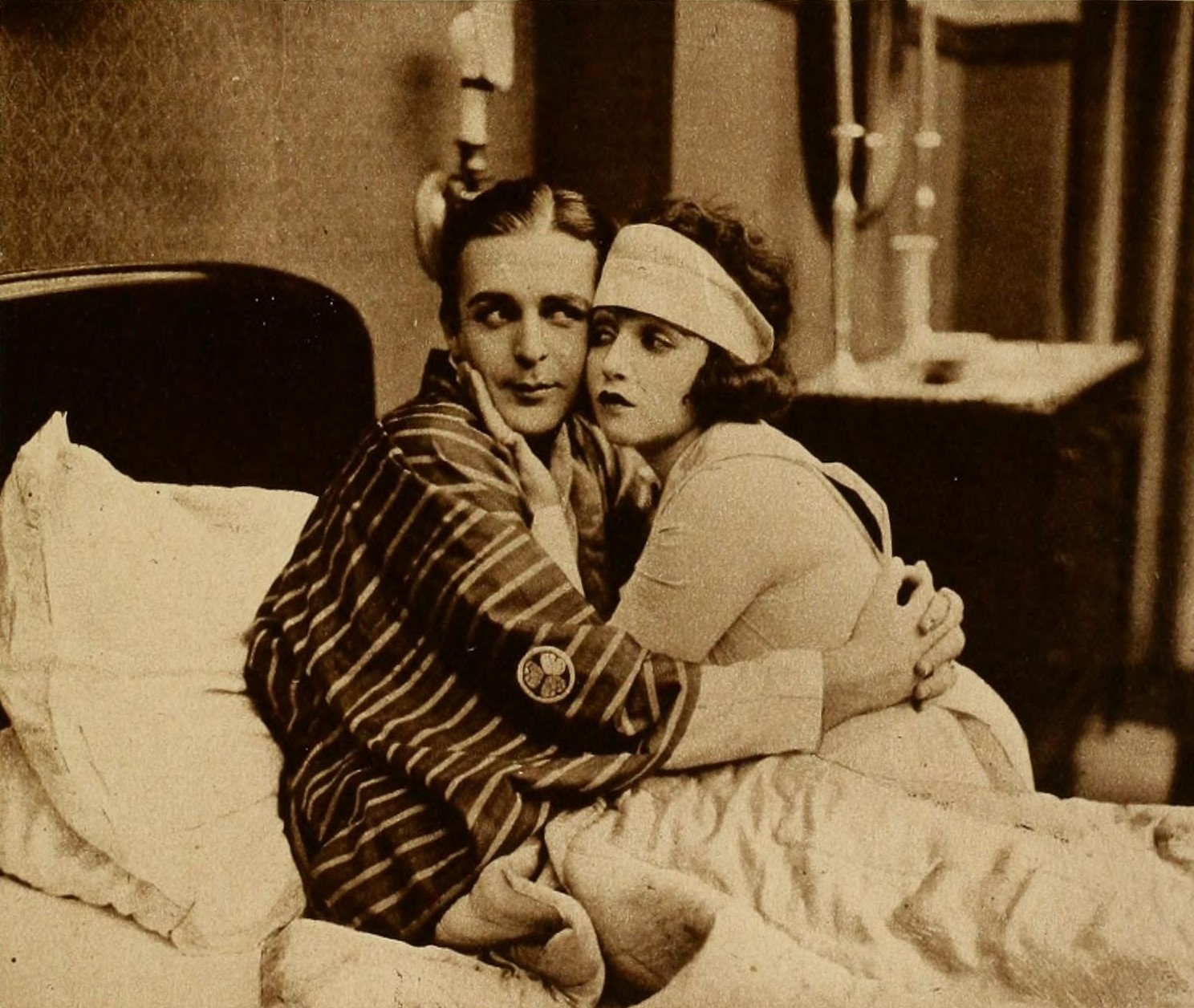
Wallace Reid and Bebe Daniels in the film

Sick Abed is a 1920 American silent comedy film produced by Famous Players–Lasky and distributed by Paramount Pictures/Artcraft, an affiliate of Paramount. It was directed by Sam Wood and stars matinee idol Wallace Reid. It is based on a 1918 Broadway stage play Sick-a-bed by Ethel Watts Mumford starring Mary Boland. The spelling of the movie varies from the spelling of the play.

This film survives at the Library of Congress.

== Plot ==
As described in a film magazine, at the Forest of Arden Inn reside John Weems, his wife Constance, and Reginald Jay. At Reginald's request, John takes a female customer out to inspect the young man's ranch property. John and the woman are held up on the road when their machine breaks down.

Meanwhile, Constance, who sees herself as a misunderstood wife, has been devoting her time to writing scenarios for motion pictures. She meets Reginald and insists that he play the part of the lover Orlando in her movie script. Jay then starts for the city in his automobile when he sees John and the lady customer coming out of a notorious roadhouse.

Reginald is shocked, but John explains that they had merely entered the place for shelter during a rain storm. John discharges his chauffeur and Jay drives him back to the Inn. To complicate matters for John, the discharged chauffeur tells Constance that John was in the roadhouse with a strange woman, whereupon Constance decides to obtain a divorce.

New staying in the city, John, aware that Reginald will be called as a witness since he has been served with a subpoena, induces Reginald to pretend that he is ill, and has hired two quack doctors, Drs. Macklyn and Widner, to carry out the scheme. The beautiful Nurse Durant is also hired, and Reginald quickly falls in love with her.

Constance obtains Reginald's temperature chart and obtains an order of the court for his examination by a neutral physician. When he realizes his nurse has been fired, Reginald jumps out of bed in pursuit of her. He finds her and brings her back.

Just before the neutral physician examines him, Nurse Durant kisses Reginald, and Dr. Flexner finds that Reginald's heart action registers badly. Constance, realizing that she has lost her Orlando, makes up her mind to retain her husband and asks his forgiveness. The two quack doctors then leave the place while the going is good.

== Cast ==
- Wallace Reid as Reginald Jay
- Bebe Daniels as Nurse Durant
- John Steppling as John Weems
- Winifred Greenwood as Constance Weems
- Tully Marshall as Detective Chalmers
- Clarence Geldart as Dr. Macklyn
- Lucien Littlefield as Dr. Widner
- Robert Bolder as Dr. Flexner
- Lorenza Lazzarini as Customer
- George Kuwa as Wing Chow

== Reception ==
Laurence Reid, writing for Motion Picture News, gave it a favorable review on July 3, 1920, writing: "Here's one picture which does not have to rely upon dialogue to score. The original version [a stage play] carried its mirth-provoking puns, too. But their absence is not felt because of the wealth of comedy business and the zest with which the players enact their parts."

== See also ==
- Wallace Reid filmography
