= The Final Impulse =

- Directed by: Thomas Ricketts
- Written by: Marc Edmund Jones
- Starring: Winifred Greenwood; Ed Coxen; George Field; Charlotte Burton
- Distributed by: Mutual Film
- Release date: October 23, 1914
- Country: United States
- Languages: Silent film English intertitles

The Final Impulse is a 1914 American silent short drama film directed by Thomas Ricketts starring Winifred Greenwood, Ed Coxen, George Field, and Charlotte Burton. It was filmed in Santa Barbara, California and depicted the Gibraltar Dam.

== Cast ==
- Winifred Greenwood as Marian
- Ed Coxen as Jack
- George Field as Woodley, a stranger
- Charlotte Burton as Ruth
- Perry Banks as Ruth's father
- William Bertram as Darby, a blacksmith
- Grace Thompson as Little Helen, his child
- John Steppling as Foreman
