= Down to Earth (1917 film) =

1917 film directed by John Emerson

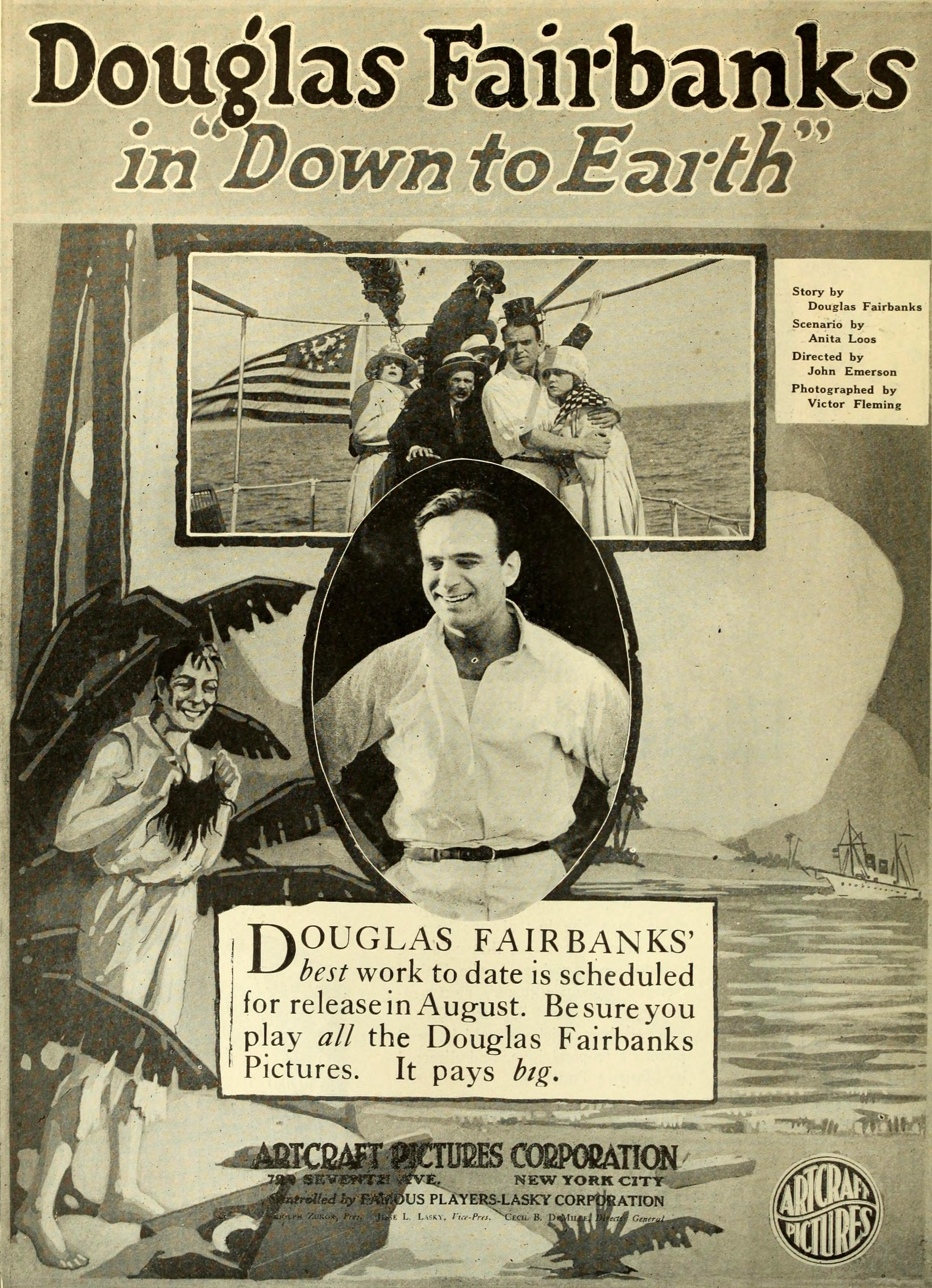
- Directed by: John Emerson
- Written by: Douglas Fairbanks (story); Anita Loos (scenario); John Emerson (scenario); Anita Loos (intertitles)
- Produced by: Douglas Fairbanks
- Starring: Douglas Fairbanks
- Cinematography: Victor Fleming; Harry Thorpe
- Distributed by: Artcraft Pictures
- Release date: August 12, 1917
- Running time: 5 reels
- Country: United States
- Language: Silent (English intertitles)

Down to Earth

Down to Earth, also known as The Optimist, is a 1917 American silent romantic comedy film starring Douglas Fairbanks and Eileen Percy, and directed by John Emerson. Most of the principal photography was filmed in Yosemite National Park.

== Synopsis ==
Bill Gaynor follows Ethel, the girl he loves, to a sanitarium she is staying to recuperate from a nervous break down. Ethel had previously refused his proposal in favor of a socialite, Charles Riddles. Bill hatches up a plan to save Ethel and the other hypochondriacs from the sanitarium, taking them on his yacht through the ruse of a smallpox scare. The yacht crashes onto an island, where Bill makes the invalids work for their own food and where they all overcome their illnesses. Two months later, Charles discovers that Palm Beach is actually in the valley below them, and he escapes the camp. Charles meets up with a friend to complain about his ordeal and with his friend's encouragement, they return to the camp and try to "kidnap" Ethel. Bill catches them in the act and neutralises them. Bill admits to Ethel that they are not on an actual desert island, but she tells him that she has known that for a month. As the two float away in a row boat, the other patients comment that they should return to their siestas because the story is over.

== Cast ==
- Douglas Fairbanks as Billy Gaynor
- Eileen Percy as Ethel Forsythe
- Gustav von Seyffertitz as Dr. Jollyem
- Charles McHugh as Dr. Samm
- Charles K. Gerrard as Charles Riddles
- William H. Keith as Mr. Carter
- Ruth Allen as Mrs. Fuller Jermes
- Fred Goodwins as Jordan Jinny
- Florence Mayon as Mrs. Phattison Oiles
- Herbert Standing as Mr. SD Dyspeptic
- David Porter as Mr. Coffin
- Bull Montana as Wild Man

== Home media ==
A DVD version was released in 2007.

== Reception ==
In his biography of Fairbanks, Jeffrey Vance writes that "some minor charm redolent of (Fairbanks's) earlier comedies" can be found "particularly (in) Down to Earth (...) with its celebration of the natural life."
