= Winifred Greenwood =

American actress (1885–1961)

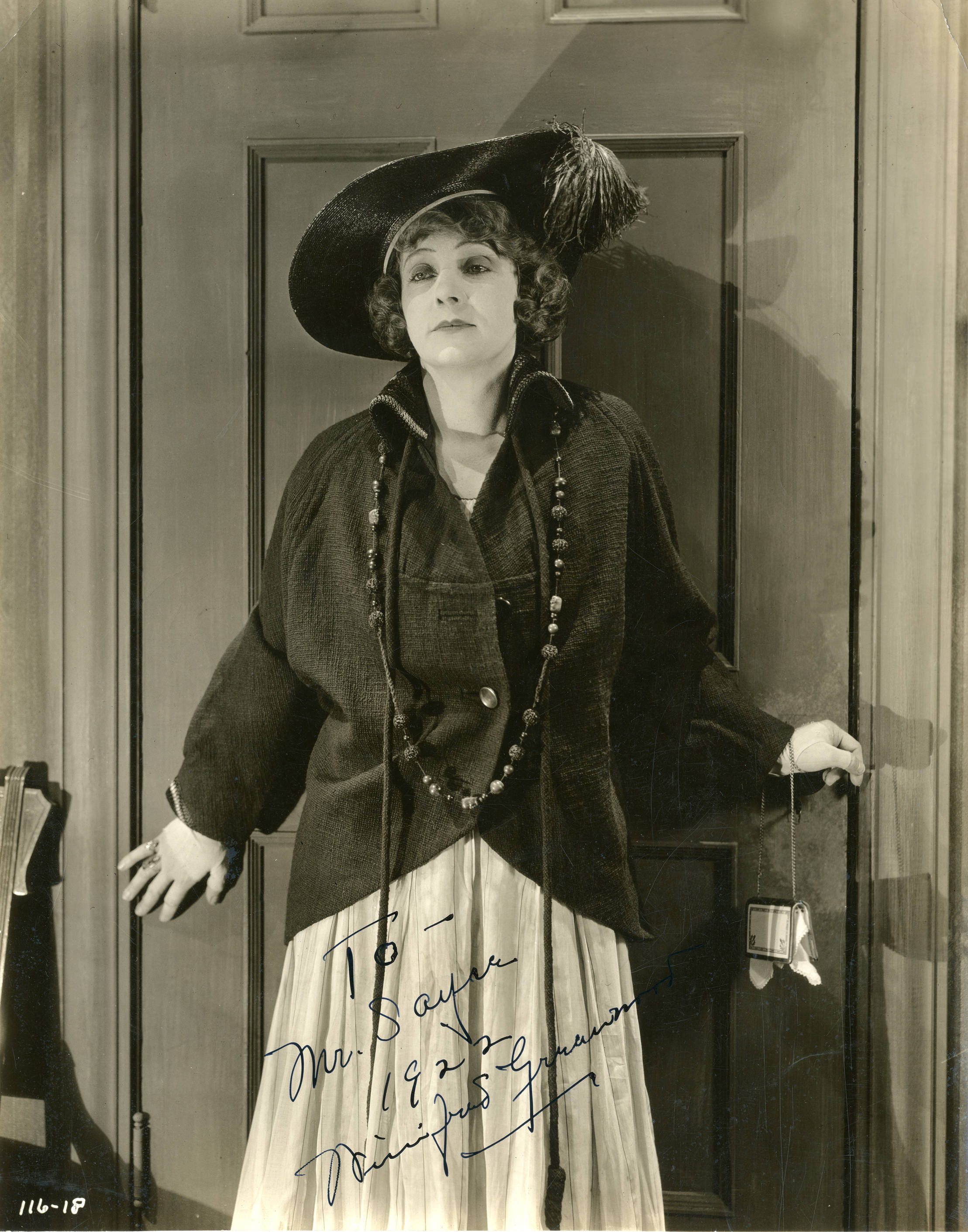
- Greenwood in 1921
- Born: January 1, 1885; Geneseo, New York, U.S.
- Died: November 23, 1961 (aged 76); Woodland Hills, California, U.S.
- Occupation: Actress
- Years active: 1910–1927
- Spouses: Joseph F. Bannister (m. 1904; div. 1913) George Field (m. 1913; div. 1918)

Winifred Louise Greenwood (January 1, 1885 – November 23, 1961) was an American silent film actress.

== Early life ==
Born in 1885 in Geneseo, New York, Greenwood studied to be a teacher but left New York Normal School to perform in vaudeville in the United States and Canada.

== Career ==
Greenwood was on the vaudeville stage from an early age, performing with the Kings Carnival Company in Canada and the United States. She went on to act with stock theater companies, one of which she headed.

She was signed in 1910 and starred in over 200 films before her retirement in 1927. She starred in a number of films with Charlotte Burton including The Shriner's Daughter in 1913. "In pictures the hours are comparatively easy, there is no traveling and we work out of doors much of the time," she explained in 1917.

Although her motion picture career ended in 1927, she continued on the stage, including a long stint in Houston, Texas. In 1929, she joined the Dana Players of Pasadena as a regular cast member. In 1934, she starred in a "modern comedy of bad manners", Six of One, produced at the Actors Workshop Theater in Los Angeles.

== Personal life ==
Greenwood's first husband was her co-star, Joseph F. Bannister; they married in 1904, and divorced in 1913. They had a son, Alonzo, and a daughter, Rene. She was married to actor George Field from 1913 to 1918. She died in 1961, age 76 in Woodland Hills, California.

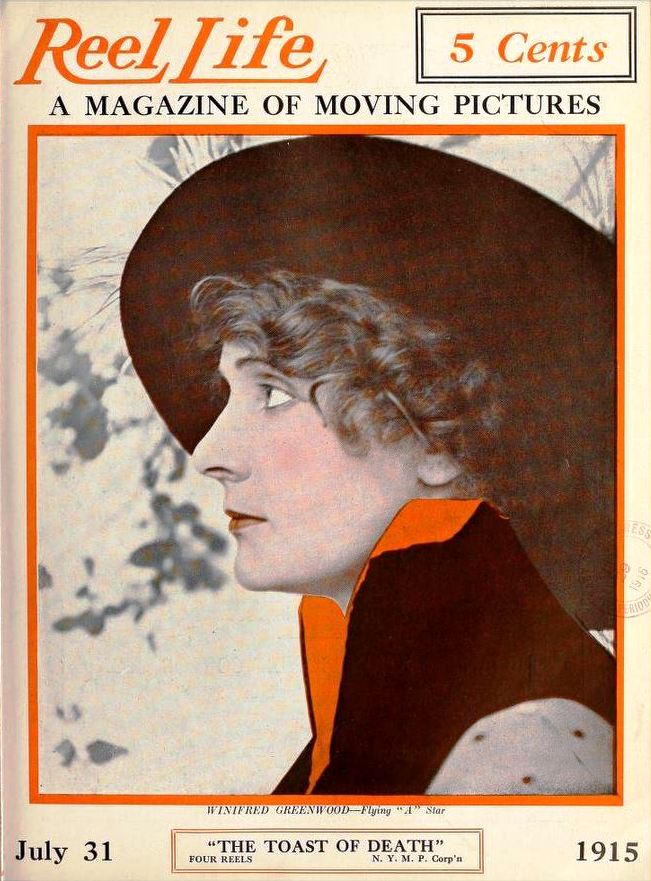
Winifred Greenwood on the cover of Reel Life magazine (Jul 31, 1915).

== Partial filmography ==
- The Wonderful Wizard of Oz (1910) (undetermined)
- Brown of Harvard (1911)
- The Shriner's Daughter (1913)
- When a Woman Waits (1914)
- In Tune (1914)
- The Dream Child (1914)
- The Little House in the Valley (1914)
- The Broken Barrier (1914)
- The Beggar Child (1914)
- The Archeologist (1914)
- A Slice of Life (1914)
- The Final Impulse (1914)
- The Redemption of a Pal (1914)
- Business Versus Love (1914)
- Footprints of Mozart (1914)
- A Soul Astray (1914)
- The Town of Nazareth (1914)
- The Resolve (1915)
- Wife Wanted (1915)
- Alien Blood (1917)
- The Crystal Gazer (1917)
- M'Liss (1918)
- Believe Me, Xantippe (1918)
- The Deciding Kiss (1918)
- The Goat (1918)
- Too Many Millions (1918)
- Come Again Smith (1919)
- Maggie Pepper (1919)
- Putting It Over (1919)
- Men, Women, and Money (1919)
- The Lottery Man (1919)
- An Adventure in Hearts (1919)
- Young Mrs. Winthrop (1920)
- Sick Abed (1920)
- Life of the Party (1920)
- Are All Men Alike? (1920)
- The Dollar-a-Year Man (1921)
- Sacred and Profane Love (1921)
- Don't Call Me Little Girl (1921)
- Love Never Dies (1921)
- To the Last Man (1923)
- Leap Year (1924)
- The Flame of the Yukon (1926)
- The King of Kings (1927)
