= Bessie Banks (actress) =

American actress and screenwriter

- Born: Bessie Estelle Naylor; August 18, 1887; Worthington, Minnesota, USA
- Died: June 25, 1969 (aged 81); Santa Barbara, California, USA
- Occupations: Actress, screenwriter
- Spouse: Perry Banks

Bessie Banks (born Bessie Estelle Naylor) was an American actress and screenwriter active in Hollywood during the silent era.

== Biography ==
Bessie was born in Worthington, Minnesota, to Stephen Naylor and Harriet Lynch. Both of her parents were from Britain. The family relocated to Santa Barbara, California, when Bessie was a girl. In Santa Barbara, she met and married her husband, Canadian actor Perry Banks; together, they performed as a vaudeville act and appeared in a number of films produced in Santa Barbara at "Flying A" Studios.

== Selected filmography ==
As screenwriter:

- The Beggar Child (1914)

As actress:

- Dulcie's Adventure (1916)
- The Stinger Stung (1916)
- Youth's Endearing Charm (1916)
- The Madonna of the Night (1916)
- Love's Bitter Strength (1916)
- A Modern Knight (1916)
- Billy Van Deusen's Wedding Eve (1916)
- Some Night (1916)
- To Rent Furnished (1915)
- Billy Van Deusen's Campaign (1915)
- Deserted at the Auto (1915)
- A Disciple of Nietzsche (1915)
- Cats, Cash and a Cook Book (1915)
- The House of a Thousand Scandals (1915)
- In Trust (1915)
- Uncle Heck, by Heck! (1915)
- His Mysterious Profession (1915)
- A Woman Scorned (1915)
- When a Woman Waits (1914)
- The Ruin of Manley (1914)
