= Uncle Tom's Cabin (1914 film) =

1914 American film

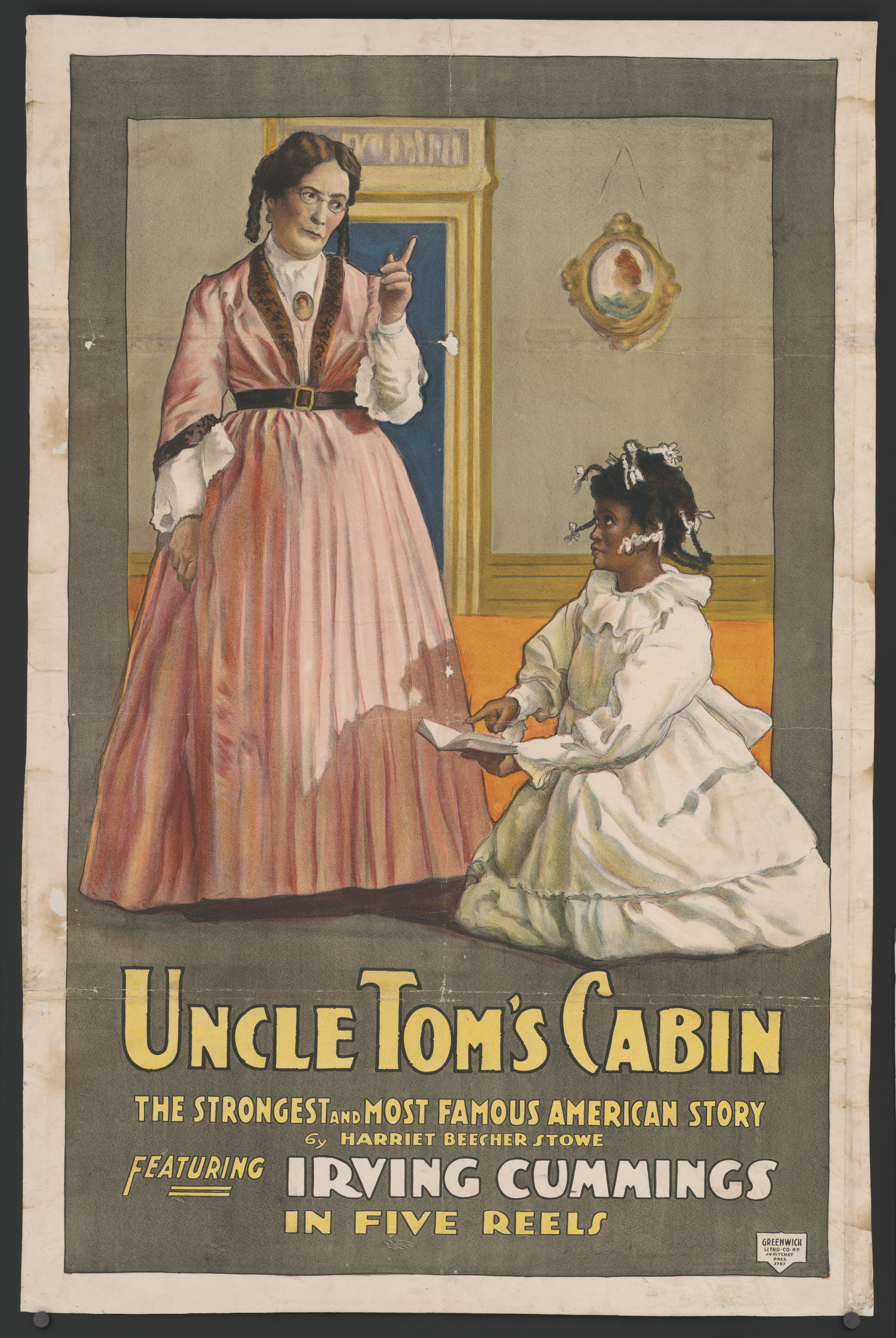
- Directed by: William Robert Daly
- Written by: Harriet Beecher Stowe (novel); George L. Aiken (play); Edward McWade
- Produced by: J.V. Ritchey
- Starring: Sam Lucas; Walter Hitchcock; Hattie Delaro
- Cinematography: Irvin Willat
- Production company: World Film
- Distributed by: World Film
- Release date: August 10, 1914
- Running time: 54 minutes
- Country: United States
- Languages: Silent; English intertitles

The full film

Uncle Tom's Cabin is a 1914 American silent historical drama film directed by William Robert Daly using Vitagraph and starring Sam Lucas, Walter Hitchcock, and Hattie Delaro. It was based upon playwright George L. Aiken's theatrical adaptation of Harriet Beecher Stowe's 1852 novel Uncle Tom's Cabin. It was produced at Fort Lee, New Jersey by the newly founded World Film studio. The film is historically notable for being the first movie with a black actor playing a leading role.

Its PR proclaimed that (unlike earlier versions) it used "real ice, real bloodhounds, real negroes, real actors, real scenes from real life as it really was in the antebellum days".

In 2012, this film was selected for preservation in the United States National Film Registry by the Library of Congress as being "culturally, historically, or aesthetically significant".

== Cast ==
- Sam Lucas as Uncle Tom
- Walter Hitchcock as George Shelby
- Hattie Delaro as Mrs. Shelby
- Master Abernathy as George Shelby Jr.
- Teresa Michelena as Eliza
- Irving Cummings as George Harris
- Paul Scardon as Haley
- Marie Eline as Little Eva St. Clair
- Garfield Thompson as St. Clair
- Roy Applegate as Simon Legree
- Boots Wall as Topsy

== Bibliography ==
- Goble, Alan. The Complete Index to Literary Sources in Film. Walter de Gruyter, 1999.
