= In Tune (film) =

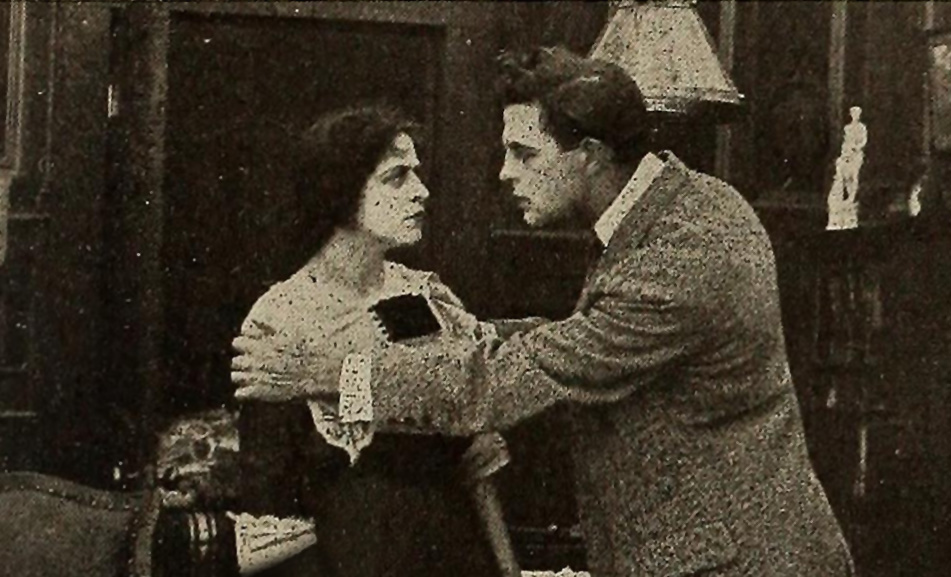
- Charlotte Burton as Bella Stanley and Ed Coxen as Tom Stanley
- Directed by: Henry Otto
- Written by: Tom Middleton (story)
- Starring: Charlotte Burton; Ed Coxen; George Field; Winifred Greenwood
- Distributed by: Mutual Film
- Release date: December 14, 1914
- Country: United States
- Languages: Silent film English intertitles

In Tune is a 1914 American silent short drama film directed by Henry Otto starring Charlotte Burton, Ed Coxen, George Field, and Winifred Greenwood.

== Plot ==
Well-known novelist Edward Stanley is defrauded by his bookkeeper, and is forced to sell his home to recoup his losses. His frivolous wife Bella, who shows no interested in his writing, leaves him but is subsequently killed in a fire. Ida, Stanley's stenographer, traces forged documents back to the bookkeeper, saving Stanley's fortune. Stanley begins work on a new novel, entitled In Tune, based on the recent events, and marries Ida.

== Cast ==
- Edward Coxen (as Ed Coxen) as Tom Stanley
- Winifred Greenwood as Ida Drew
- Charlotte Burton as Mrs. Tom Stanley
- George Field as Robert Long
- John Steppling as Ed Mason
- William Bertram as Mr. White
- King Clark as Mr. Dunn
