= Ethel M. Kelley =

American writer

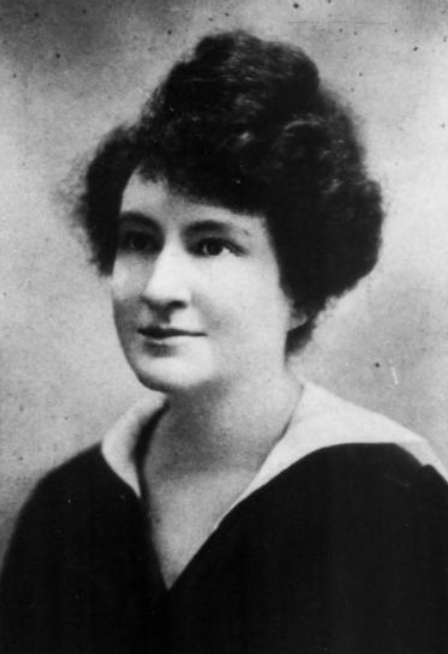
- Ethel M. Kelley, from a 1918 publication
- Born: Ethel May Kelley; June 21, 1878; West Harwich, Massachusetts, U.S.
- Died: August 1, 1955 (age 77); Cambridge, New York, U.S.
- Other names: Ethel M. Kelly, Barbara Kay, Lucia Whitney
- Occupation: Writer

Ethel May Kelley (June 21, 1878 – August 1, 1955) was an American writer of novels, stories, and poems, active in the early twentieth century.

== Early life and education ==
Kelley was born in West Harwich, Massachusetts, on Cape Cod, the daughter of Gersham Hall Kelley and Laura Etta Small Kelley. She began writing for a local newspaper when she was twelve years old, and sold poems to national publications while she was still in her teens.

== Career ==
Kelley wrote novels, stories, and poetry. One of her novels, Turn About Eleanor, was adapted for the screen as The Deciding Kiss (1918). Her bestselling novel Wings (1925) was called a "pop-eyed, nutty book", mainly for its flapper characters and backwards timeline. However, the book was also compared with works by Edith Wharton and Willa Cather. Modern young people were also the main characters of Turn About Eleanor (1917) and Beauty and Mary Blair (1921).

Kelley was fiction editor at Hampton's Magazine from 1906 to 1913, working with Theodore Dreiser. She commented on children's literature and recommended books for children. In 1927, she was one of the writers in a newspaper roundtable on the subject "Women and Wives—Are they Rebels Against Society?", along with Floyd Dell, Harvey Fergusson, Thyra Samter Winslow, and John Van Alstyne Weaver. She sometimes used the pen names "Barbara Kay" and "Lucia Whitney".

When I Was Little (1915), by Ethel M. Kelley

== Publications ==
- "My Heart Hath a Song" (1901, Century)
- "Refuge" (1901, Century)
- "The Promised Land" (1901, Lippincott's)
- "The Artistic Temperament" (1905, poem)
- When I Was Little (1915, poetry collection for children, illustrated by Maud Hunt Squire)
- "In the Bath" and "Whose Little Girl?" (1916, poems)
- Turn About Eleanor (1917, novel)
- Over Here: The Story of a War Bride (1918, novel)
- Outside Inn (1920, novel)
- "I've Got a Dog" (1920, poem)
- Elizabeth—Her Friends and Elizabeth—Her Folks (1920, for young readers, as Barbara Kay)
- Beauty and Mary Blair (1921, novel)
- Heart's Blood (1923)
- Wings (1924, novel)
- "De Profundis" (1926, poem)
- Home, James! (1927, novel)
- "Is Modern Woman a Rebel? Yes, and No" (1927)
- Strange Avenue (1932)
- Through My Open Door (1935, memoir, as Lucia Whitney)

== Personal life ==
Kelley lived for several years in Detroit with her family. She had long spells of illness throughout her life. She died in 1955, at the age of 77, in Cambridge, New York.
