= Putting It Over =

1919 lost silent film comedy directed by Donald Crisp

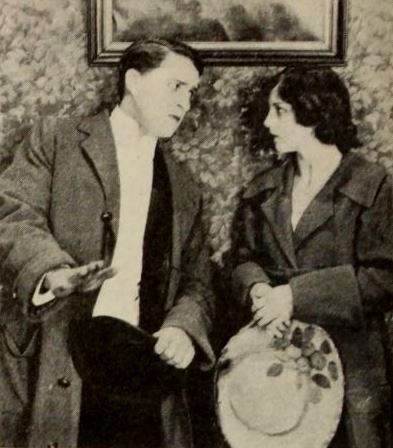
- Bryant Washburn and Shirley Mason
- Directed by: Donald Crisp
- Written by: George Weston (story); Marion Fairfax (scenario)
- Produced by: Adolph Zukor; Jesse Lasky
- Starring: Bryant Washburn; Shirley Mason
- Distributed by: Paramount Pictures
- Release date: June 1, 1919
- Running time: 5 reels
- Country: United States
- Language: Silent (English intertitles)

Putting It Over is a lost 1919 American silent comedy film directed by Donald Crisp and starring Bryant Washburn. The film was produced by Famous Players–Lasky with distribution being handled by Paramount Pictures.

== Plot ==
As described in a film magazine, Buddy works in a drug store mixing soda waters for $12 a week. By calling his landlady "Dearie" and having sex with her daughter, he is allowed certain liberties around his boarding house. He falls in love with a stenographer and in a moment of confidence proposes to her, and she accepts. He tells her that he makes $50 a week. A cut in the workforce at the drug store finds him without a job. He is also ejected from his room, and spends the night in the park. During the long hours of the night he evolves a scheme which the drug store puts into practice, and he soon has a position at his old firm paying $50 a week. On the day he accepts the job offer the wedding bells ring out.

== Cast ==
- Bryant Washburn as Robert "Buddy" Marsh
- Shirley Mason as Mary Stacey
- Adele Farrington as Mrs. Peeler
- Winifred Greenwood as Miss June Peeler
- Casson Ferguson as Perkins
- Clarence Geldart as Mr. Hard (credited as C.H. Geldert)
- Edward Alexander as Percival
- Robert Dunbar as Chilton
- Guy Oliver as Policeman
- Edna Mae Cooper
