= To Rent Furnished =

1915 film

- Directed by: B. Reeves Eason
- Starring: Bessie Banks
- Distributed by: Mutual Film
- Release date: November 12, 1915
- Country: United States
- Languages: Silent; English intertitles

To Rent Furnished is a 1915 American short film directed by B. Reeves Eason.

== Cast ==
- Bessie Banks
- Harry Edmondson
- Vivian Rich
- Walter Spencer
