= Caprice (1913 film) =

1913 film by J. Searle Dawley

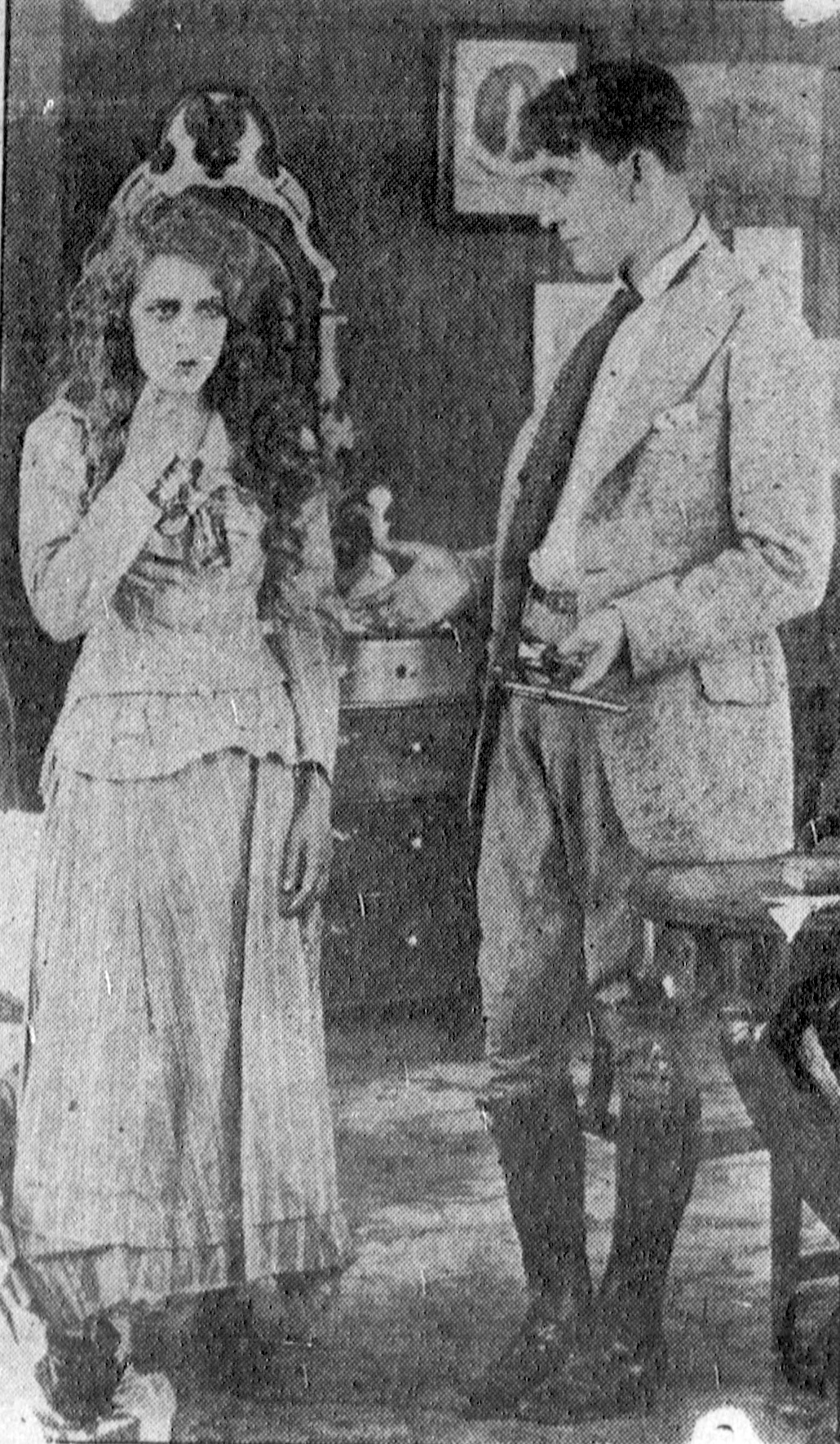
- Scene from the film.
- Directed by: J. Searle Dawley
- Based on: play by Howard P. Taylor
- Produced by: Adolph Zukor; Daniel Frohman
- Starring: Mary Pickford; Owen Moore
- Cinematography: H. Lyman Broening
- Production company: Famous Players Film Company
- Distributed by: Famous Players Film Company (State's Rights)
- Release date: November 10, 1913
- Running time: 4 reels
- Country: United States
- Language: Silent (English intertitles)

Caprice is a 1913 American silent film directed by J. Searle Dawley and starring Mary Pickford. Daniel Frohman and Adolph Zukor produced the film for Famous Players Film Company. It is now lost.

== Background ==
A young Minnie Maddern Fiske performed the story on stage in the 1880s, one of her earliest successes as an adult actress. The film adaptation provided Pickford with the opportunity to demonstrate her dramatic range beyond her popular screen persona.

== Production ==
Although Adolph Zukor helped finance the film, it was distributed through an arrangement with State's Rights primarily because Paramount Pictures did not yet exist.

== Cast ==
- Mary Pickford as Mercy Baxter
- Owen Moore as Jack Henderson
- Ernest Truex as Wally Henderson
- Ogden Crane as Jim Baxter
- James Gordon as Mr. Henderson
- Boots Wall as Edith Henderson
- Louise Huff (uncredited)
- Howard Missimer (uncredited)
- John Steppling (uncredited)
