= Dulcie's Adventure =

1916 film by James Kirkwood

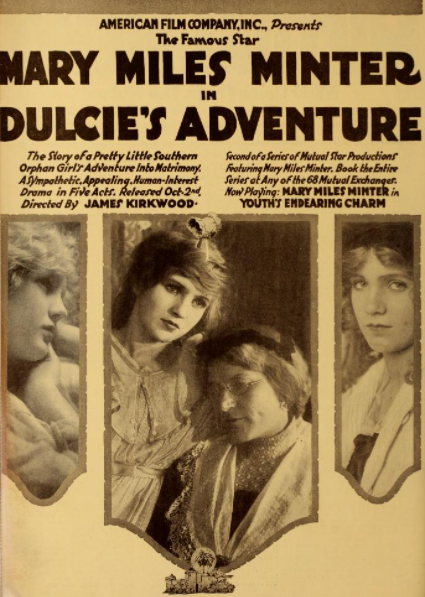
- Advertisement in Motion Picture News
- Directed by: James Kirkwood
- Written by: William Pigott
- Based on: A novel by R. Strauss
- Starring: Mary Miles Minter; Bessie Banks; Allan Forrest
- Cinematography: Carl Widen
- Distributed by: Mutual Film
- Release date: October 16, 1916 (United States)
- Running time: 5 reels
- Country: United States
- Languages: Silent; English intertitles

Dulcie's Adventure is a 1916 American silent drama film, directed by James Kirkwood, and starring Mary Miles Minter and Bessie Banks. The script for the film was adapted by William Pigott from a novel written by R. Strauss. The film is notable for being the first time that Allan Forrest appeared as Minter's leading man; the two would make a further 19 features together, ending with The Heart Specialist. As with many of Minter's features, it is believed to be a lost film.

== Plot ==
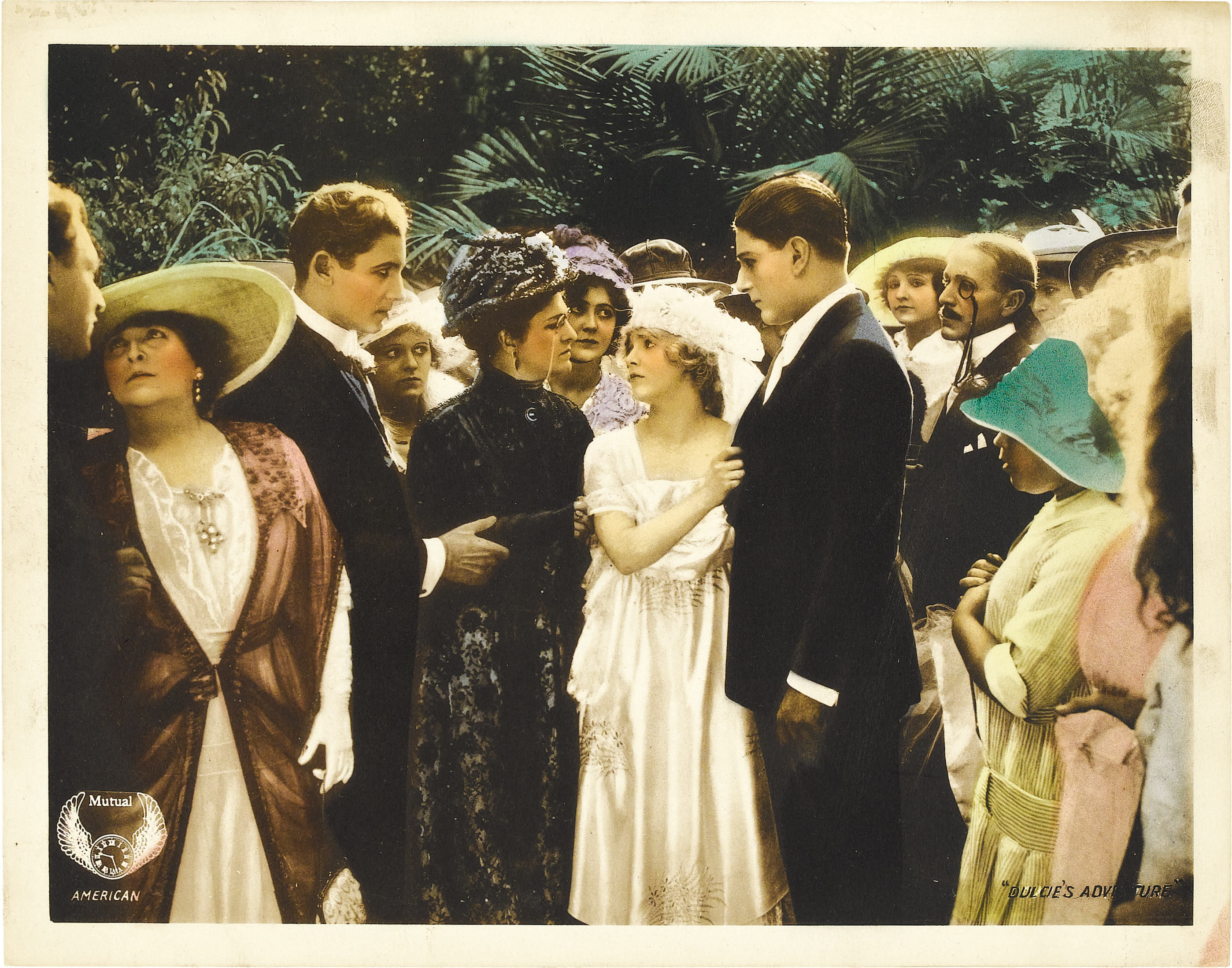
Lobby Card for "Dulcie's Adventure"

As detailed in film magazines, Dulcie (Minter) is an orphaned girl who lives on an estate in the South with her two spinster aunts. Being from an aristocratic background, the aunts try to forbid Dulcie from playing with the poorer neighbourhood children, but Dulcie forms a particular friendship with Harry the grocer's son (Forrest), who gifts her a pet squirrel.

When Aunt Emmie dies, Aunt Netta decides that Dulcie must be married to a rich man if they are to avoid financial ruin, although Dulcie cares only for Harry. Aunt Netta travels to California with her niece, who is persuaded to go only when her aunt convinces her that Harry is in love with someone else. In California, Dulcie is quickly betrothed to a man who purports to be nobility, although Aunt Netta once again has to lie and convince her that Harry is now married before she consents to the wedding.

On the day of Dulcie's wedding, the ceremony is interrupted by detectives, and it transpires that her betrothed is a fraudster posing as nobility. Harry, meanwhile, has arrived at the wedding uninvited. Finding the bride ready and waiting, and lacking only a groom, he offers to fill the space, and is accepted gladly by Dulcie.

== Cast ==
- Mary Miles Minter as Dulcie
- Bessie Banks as Aunt Emmie
- Marie Van Tassell as Aunt Netta
- Alan Forrest as Harry
- Harry von Meter as Jonas
- Molly Shafer
- Perry Banks
- John Gough
- Gertrude Le Brandt
- William Carroll
- Robert Klein
