= A Woman Scorned (1915 film) =

- Directed by: William Desmond Taylor
- Written by: William Desmond Taylor (Scenario)
- Starring: Robyn Adair; Bessie Banks
- Distributed by: Mutual Film
- Release date: July 2, 1915
- Running time: 2 reels
- Country: United States
- Languages: Silent film English intertitles

A Woman Scorned is a 1915 American silent short drama film written and directed by William Desmond Taylor. The film stars Robyn Adair, Bessie Banks, Nan Christy, Beatrice Van, and Harry Van Meter.

One of four films with this title made between 1911 and 1915.

== Cast ==
- Robyn Adair
- Bessie Banks
- Nan Christy
- Beatrice Van
- Harry Van Meter (aka Harry von Meter)
