= Edna Mae Cooper =

American silent film actress

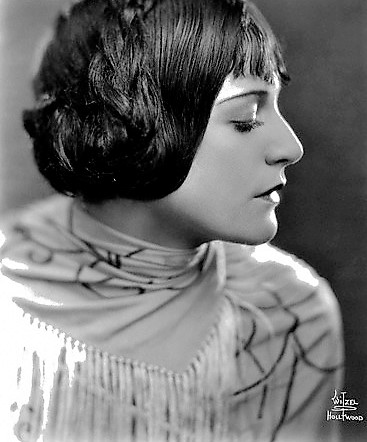
- Born: July 19, 1900; Baltimore, Maryland, US
- Died: June 27, 1986 (aged 85); Woodland Hills neighborhood of Los Angeles, California, US
- Other names: Edna May Cooper, Edna Mae Brown
- Occupations: Silent film actress, aviator
- Spouse: Karl Brown

Edna Mae Cooper (July 19, 1900 – June 27, 1986), also seen as Edna May Cooper, was an American actress of the silent era. She appeared in dozens of films between 1911 and 1929. She was also involved in aviation, setting an endurance record in 1931 with fellow pilot Bobbi Trout.

== Early life ==
Cooper was born in Baltimore, Maryland, and raised in Long Beach, California, the daughter of Mary Mae Cooper. She earned a pilot's license at Parks Air College in St. Louis in 1930.

== Career ==
=== Film ===
Producer-director Cecil B. DeMille discovered Cooper in the casting office of the Famous Players–Lasky studio. She was "jobless and weeping" and he invited her to his office and nicknamed her "The Girl With The Tragic Eyes". DeMille then gave her a part in his 1917 silent film The Woman God Forgot, and she also had roles in his silent-era biblical epics, The Ten Commandments (1923) and The King of Kings (1927). Her other films include Men, Women, and Money (1919) and Grounds for Divorce (1925). The King of Kings inspired her to write The Life of Christ, which became the basis for the dramatic lectures she gave at church clubs and hospitals around the world.

Cooper played a lady of the pharaoh's court in DeMille's 1956 remake of The Ten Commandments. She and Julia Faye appeared in both versions. Cooper said, "Before I start my Bible talks over in Korea and Formosa, I wanted to work again for this man whom I regard as the world's greatest preacher. The Ten Commandments will be an inspiring motion picture, as was the first, in 1923, of which I was a part. That's why I'm back once more as an actress."

=== Aviation ===
Cooper announced that she was leaving films for aviation in 1930. In 1931, co-pilots Cooper and Bobbi Trout set the world's refueling endurance record, with a flight over the airport in Los Angeles. They first attempted the flight on January 1, 1931, but due to technical problems they had to abort the flight. At their next attempt, they were successful in flying straight for 122 hours and 50 minutes, despite windy and rainy conditions. They ended the run on January 9, 1931, in difficult weather, with engine problems. Trout and Cooper appeared together at the Sacramento Auto Show in February 1931, with the plane they used to set the record, the Lady Rolph.

In March 1931, Cooper went missing from Santa Monica, and was discovered a week later in a hotel in Monterey, registered under an alias, injured and confused. She had bruises and a head injury. The doctor on her case linked her condition to her aviation stunt, telling newspapers that it was probably "a cumulative exhaustion" that "sapped her nervous strength".

Trout and Cooper's 1931 record earned them decorations from several governments, and still stood in 1949. Cooper was a friend to Amelia Earhart. In 1937, she and her son drove from Los Angeles to New York in under four days, seeking another record.

=== Later activities ===
In 1934, Cooper's leg was injured when a lighting fixture fell on her while she was shopping for shoes. In 1935, she was in the news for a property dispute over an apartment she owned. In 1936, she told a reporter that she was writing about show business. Cooper was injured in a serious car accident in December 1940, and spent much of the next five years recovering. After 1945, she visited churches and hospitals to tell inspirational stories of her recovery, with a presentation titled "The Life of Christ", involving religious music and imagery. She sold Christmas cards, and sought investor funding to bring her production to military hospitals in Hawaii, Japan, Korea, and Germany in 1950. She was a member of the American Legion Auxiliary.

== Filmography ==
- 1917: The Woman God Forgot
- 1918: Rimrock Jones - Hazel Hardesty
- 1918: The Whispering Chorus - Good Face
- 1918: Old Wives for New - Bertha
- 1918: Sauce for the Goose - Mrs. Edith Darch
- 1919: You Never Saw Such a Girl - Mrs. McKenzie
- 1919: Putting It Over
- 1919: Men, Women, and Money - Miss Cote
- 1919: The Third Kiss - Gwendolin Finn
- 1919: Male and Female - Fisher
- 1919: Peg o' My Heart
- 1920: Why Change Your Wife? - Gordon's Maid
- 1923: The Ten Commandments - Israelite Woman
- 1924: The Folly of Vanity - Russian Vamp (modern sequence)
- 1925: Beauty and the Bad Man - Mayme
- 1925: Grounds for Divorce - Marie
- 1925: Sally, Irene and Mary - Maggie
- 1926: Scotty of the Scouts - Effie Middleton
- 1927: The King of Kings - (uncredited)
- 1928: The Swim Princess (Short) - Swimming Coach
- 1928: The Blue Danube
- 1928: Speedy - Minor Role (uncredited)
- 1928: Say It with Sables - Maid
- 1928: Code of the Air
- 1928: The Apache - Minor Role (uncredited)
- 1928: George Washington Cohen
- 1929: Foolish Husbands (Short) - Committee Woman
- 1929: Don't Get Jealous (Short) - Mrs. Blake
- 1956: The Ten Commandments - Woman of the Court (final film role)

== Personal life ==
Copper's husband was Karl Brown, a cinematographer, screenwriter, and director. They had a son, Karl, and later divorced. Cooper died in 1986, aged 86, in the Woodland Hills neighborhood of Los Angeles, California.
