= Alien Blood =

- Directed by: Burton George
- Written by: Captain Leslie T. Peacocke
- Based on: The Alien Blood by Louise Rice
- Produced by: Balboa Amusement Producing Company; E. D. Horkheimer; H. M. Horkheimer
- Starring: Clifford Grey; Winifred Greenwood
- Cinematography: Paul Garnett
- Distributed by: General Film
- Release date: March 29, 1917
- Running time: 4 reels
- Country: United States
- Language: Silent film ..English titles

Alien Blood is a 1917 American silent drama film directed by Burton George and starring Winifred Greenwood. It is taken from a short story, The Alien Blood, by Louise Rice.

The film is preserved at the Library of Congress.

== Cast ==
- Clifford Grey -
- Winifred Greenwood -
