= Tess of the d'Urbervilles (1913 film) =

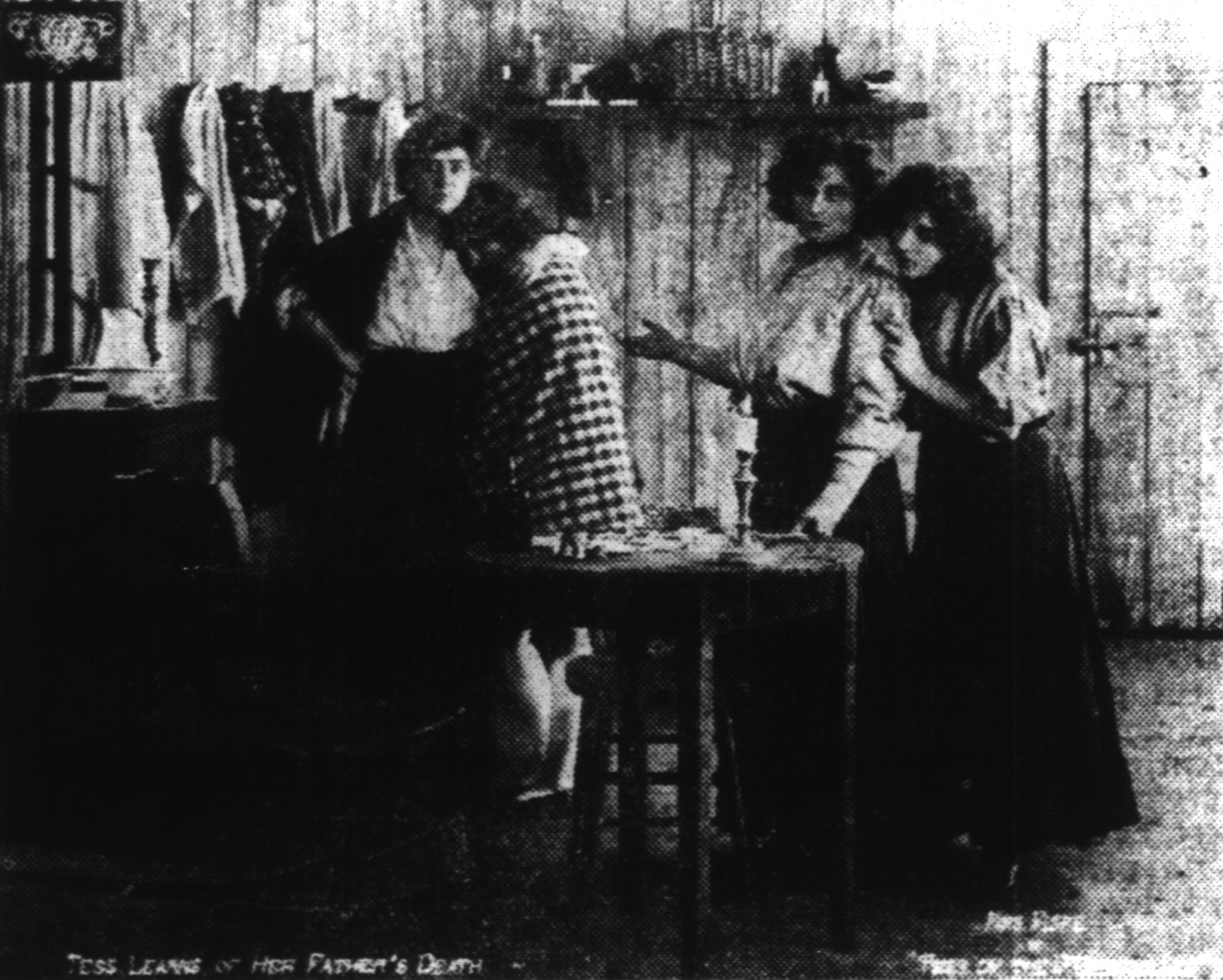
- Scene from the film
- Directed by: J. Searle Dawley
- Written by: Lorimer Stoddard (1897 play which the film is adapted from)
- Based on: Tess of the d'Urbervilles by Thomas Hardy
- Produced by: Daniel Frohman
- Starring: Mrs. Fiske
- Production company: Famous Players Film Company
- Distributed by: Paramount Pictures
- Release date: September 1, 1913
- Running time: 5 reels
- Country: United States
- Language: Silent (English intertitles)

Tess of the d'Urbervilles is a 1913 American silent drama film based upon the Thomas Hardy 1891 novel of the same name and was one of the first feature films made. It was directed by J. Searle Dawley, released by Famous Players Film Company and stars Mrs. Fiske, reprising her famous role from the 1897 play.

It was an Adolph Zukor feature production after securing the services of top American actress Mrs. Fiske. A fragment of this film is said to exist.

== Cast ==
- Mrs. Fiske - Tess Durbeyfield
- Raymond Bond - Angel Clare
- David Torrence - Alec D'Urberville
- John Steppling - John Durbeyfield
- Mary Barker - Mrs. Durbeyfield
- James Gordon - Crick
- Maggie Weston - Mrs. Crick
- Irma La Pierre - Marian
- Katherine Griffith - Mrs. D'Urberville
- Franklin Hall - Parson Clare
- Camille Dalberg - Mrs. Clare
- J. Liston - Parson Tringham
- Boots Wall - Reta
- Caroline Darling - Izz
- Justina Huff - Liza Lou
- John Troughton - Jonathan

== Reception ==
Like many American films of the time, Tess of the d'Urbervilles was subject to city and state film censorship boards. In 1917 the Chicago Board of Censors issued the film, due to its subject matter, an "adults only" permit.

== See also ==
- List of Paramount Pictures films
