= The Archeologist =

1914 film by Henry Otto

- Directed by: Henry Otto
- Written by: Virginia Whitmore
- Starring: Ed; Winifred Greenwood; John Steppling
- Distributed by: Mutual Film Corporation
- Release date: November 25, 1914
- Running time: 1 reel (approximately 10 minutes)
- Country: United States
- Languages: Silent film English intertitles

The Archeologist is a 1914 American silent short drama film directed by Henry Otto starring Ed, Winifred Greenwood, and John Steppling.

== Cast ==
- Ed Coxen as Billy Green
- Winifred Greenwood as Mary Devon
- John Steppling as James Devon, her father
- Edith Borella as Mimi
- Charlotte Burton as Edna Lee
- George Field as Snow Ball
