= Men, Women, and Money =

1919 film by George Melford

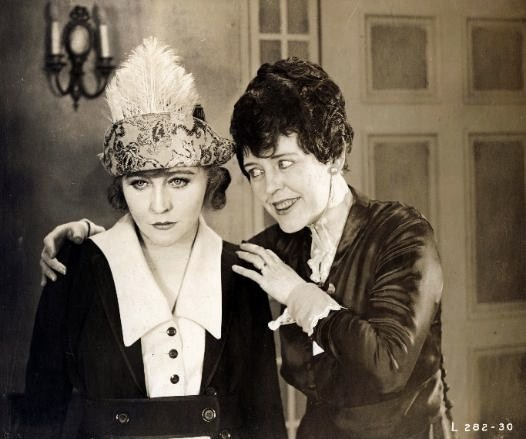
- Still with Ethel Clayton and Mayme Kelso
- Directed by: George Melford
- Screenplay by: Beulah Marie Dix; Cosmo Hamilton
- Produced by: Jesse L. Lasky
- Starring: Ethel Clayton; James Neill; Jane Wolfe; Lew Cody; Sylvia Ashton; Irving Cummings; Winifred Greenwood
- Cinematography: Paul P. Perry
- Production company: Famous Players–Lasky Corporation
- Distributed by: Paramount Pictures
- Release date: June 15, 1919
- Running time: 50 minutes
- Country: United States
- Language: Silent (English intertitles)

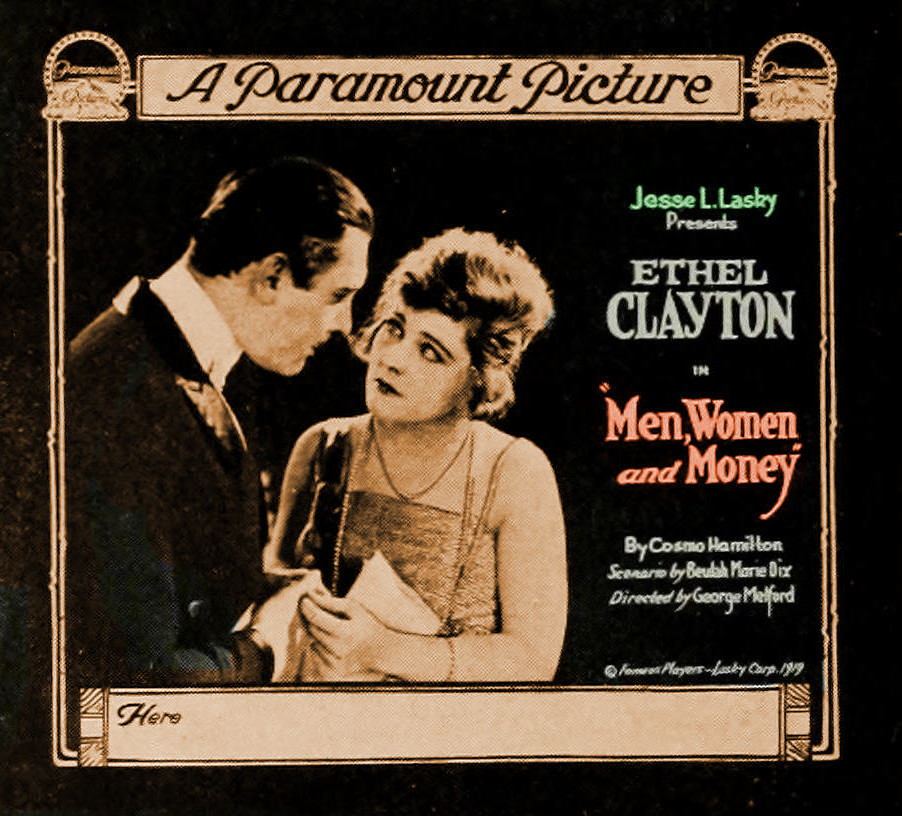
Lantern slide

Men, Women, and Money is a lost 1919 American drama silent film directed by George Melford and written by Beulah Marie Dix and Cosmo Hamilton. The film stars Ethel Clayton, James Neill, Jane Wolfe, Lew Cody, Sylvia Ashton, Irving Cummings, and Winifred Greenwood. The film was released on June 15, 1919, by Paramount Pictures.

== Plot ==
As described in a film magazine, left an orphan with $2,000 in cash, Marcel Middleton goes to visit some friends in New York City, where her phenomenal luck in bridge nets her funds for her support. Innocently, she falls in with a fast crowd and finds making ends meet a difficult task. Cleveland Buchanan and Julian Chadwick become suitors, but their proposals do not include matrimony. With her luck at cards failing, she becomes indebted to Buchanan. When she refuses his attentions, he resolves to make himself worthy of her honest love and reforms himself. When Marcel obtains an engagement as a cloak model for fashionable customers, Chadwick makes plans for her ruin, but Buchanan rescues her in time and they are married.

== Cast ==
- Ethel Clayton as Marcel Middleton
- James Neill as Parker Middleton
- Jane Wolfe as Sara Middleton
- Lew Cody as Cleveland Buchanan
- Sylvia Ashton as Aunt Hannah
- Irving Cummings as Julian Chadwick
- Winifred Greenwood as Noel Parkton
- Edna Mae Cooper as Miss Cote
- Leslie Stuart as Toto
- Mayme Kelso as Madame Ribout
- Lillian Leighton as Mrs. Weeks
- Lallah Rookh Hart as Miss Dunston
- ZaSu Pitts as Katie Jones
- Fay Holderness as Mrs. Parkton
- Helen Dunbar as Mrs. Channing
- Charles Ogle as Dr. Malcolm Lloyd
- Marie Newall as Cora
