= The Deciding Kiss =

1918 film

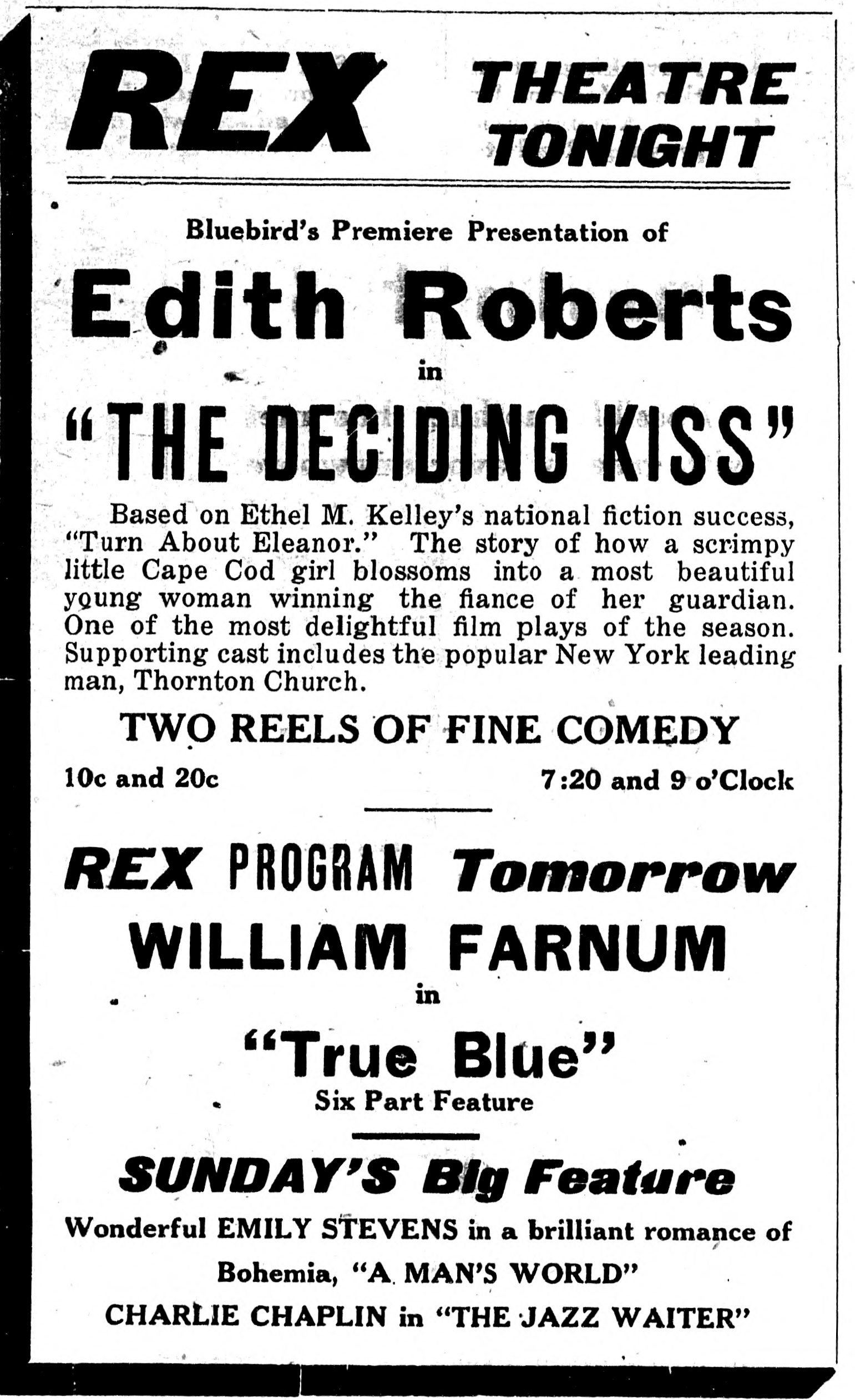
- Newspaper advertisement
- Directed by: Tod Browning
- Written by: Bernard McConville
- Based on: Turn About Eleanor by Ethel M. Kelley
- Starring: Edith Roberts; Winifred Greenwood
- Cinematography: John W. Brown
- Distributed by: Universal Film Manufacturing Company
- Release date: July 22, 1918
- Running time: 5 reels
- Country: United States
- Language: Silent (English intertitles)

The Deciding Kiss is a 1918 American comedy film directed by Tod Browning. The film was considered a lost film for decades. A print was discovered at the French archive Centre national du cinéma et de l'image animée in Fort de Bois-d'Arcy.

== Plot ==
As described in a film magazine, Eleanor Hamlin, who has been living with an old and impoverished couple, is adopted by two couples, Mr. and Mrs. Sears and Beulah Page and Peter Bolling, young people who have read of cooperative parenting and wish to try out the theory. It works very well until Jimmy Sears loses control of himself under the spell of his adopted daughter's kisses. This passes, however, but then Peter falls in love with her. Beulah then tells Eleanor that she is engaged to Peter, and the heart-broken little girl goes back home. After an exhaustive search, Peter fails to find her, and he and Beulah complete their engagement. Eleanor returns, sees the true state of things, and asks God to let her be always their little girl.

== Cast ==
- Edith Roberts as Eleanor Hamlin
- Winifred Greenwood as Beulah Page
- Hallam Cooley as Jimmy Sears (credited as Hal Cooley)
- Hans Unterkircher as Peter Bolling (credited as Thornton Church)
- Lottie Kruse (as Lottie Kruze)
- Edmund Cobb (credited as Edwin Cobb)
- William Courtright (credited as William Cartwright)

== Reception ==
Like many American films of the time, The Deciding Kiss was subject to restrictions and cuts by city and state film censorship boards. For example, the Chicago Board of Censors required, in Reel 4, that the kissing scene at the piano be shortened by eliminating the last half.
