= In Trust =

1915 film

- Directed by: B. Reeves Eason
- Starring: Bessie Banks
- Distributed by: Mutual Film
- Release date: September 6, 1915
- Country: United States
- Languages: Silent; English intertitles

In Trust is a 1915 American short film directed by B. Reeves Eason and starring Vivian Rich.

== Cast ==
- Bessie Banks
- Perry Banks
- Charles Bartlett
- Louise Lester
- Jack Richardson
- Vivian Rich
