= Ethel Watts Mumford =

American poet

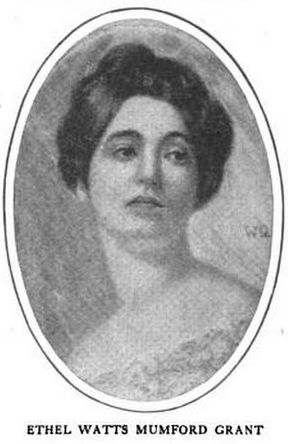
Ethel Watts Mumford Grant, from a 1908 publication.

Ethel Watts Mumford (1876/1878 – 1940) was an American author from New York City. The surname Mumford came from her first husband, George D. Mumford, a lawyer (married 1894–1901).

After her first husband grew intolerant of her prolific writing and art career, she fled to San Francisco in 1899 with their only child, a son. She sued for divorce on grounds of desertion. After the divorce was granted in 1901, she returned to New York, vowing never to remarry unless her husband accepted her career. On June 4, 1906, she married Peter Geddes Grant of Grantown, Morayshire, Scotland.

The daughter of a wealthy businessman, she was given a fine education, topped by her study of painting at the Julian Academy of Paris. She traveled extensively in Europe, the Far East, and North America, experience that is well-reflected in her work.

Most of her early published works were written in San Francisco including her first novel, Dupes. She was a heavy producer of plays, vaudeville sketches, novels, short stories, joke collections, songs, poems, and articles. She also painted and illustrated books.

In her teen years, after studying dramatic technique by reading 2,000 manuscripts, she turned to playwriting. Her farces were produced on New York and London stages. After her 1906 marriage she wrote for a time under the name "Ethel Watts Mumford Grant," adding her second husband's name, but eventually reverted to "Ethel Watts Mumford" as a byline.

== Quotes ==
She said, "God gave us our relatives; thank God we can choose our friends."

She said, "Knowledge is power, if you know it about the right person."

== Works ==
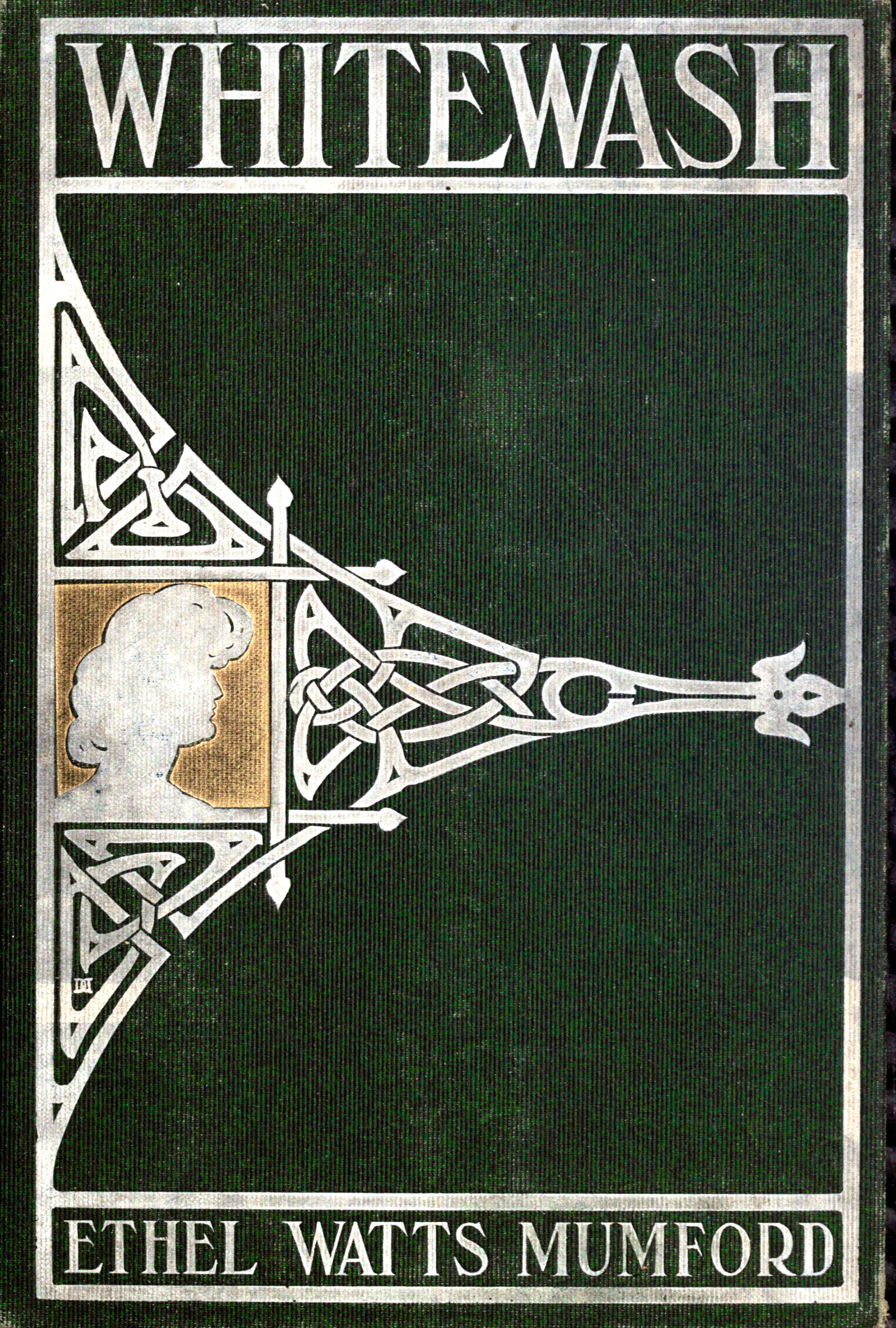
Whitewash (1903)

- Dupes (1901)
- Whitewash (1903)
- Out of the Ashes (1913 – ISBN 1-4142-4999-3)
- The Young Idea later renamed Just Herself for Broadway. (1914)
- Sick-a-bed: A farcical comedy in three acts (1919)(*made into a 1920 silent film Sick Abed)
- All in the Night's Work (1924)
- Hand-reading today: A new angle of an ancient science (1925)

With Addison Mizner and Oliver Herford

- The Cynic's Calendar of Revised Wisdom for 1903 (1902).
- The Limerick Up to Date Book (1903)
- The Cynic's Calendar of Revised Wisdom for 1904 (1903)
- The Entirely New Cynic's Calendar of Revised Wisdom for 1905 (1904)
- The Complete Cynic's Calendar of Revised Wisdom for 1906 (1905)
- The Altogether New Cynic's Calendar of Revised Wisdom for 1907 (1906)
- The Quite New Cynic's Calendar of Revised Wisdom for 1908 (1907)
- The Perfectly Good Cynic's Calendar (1908)
- The Complete Cynic (1910)
- The Revived Cynic's Calendar (1917)
