= The Third Kiss (1919 film) =

1919 film by Robert G. Vignola

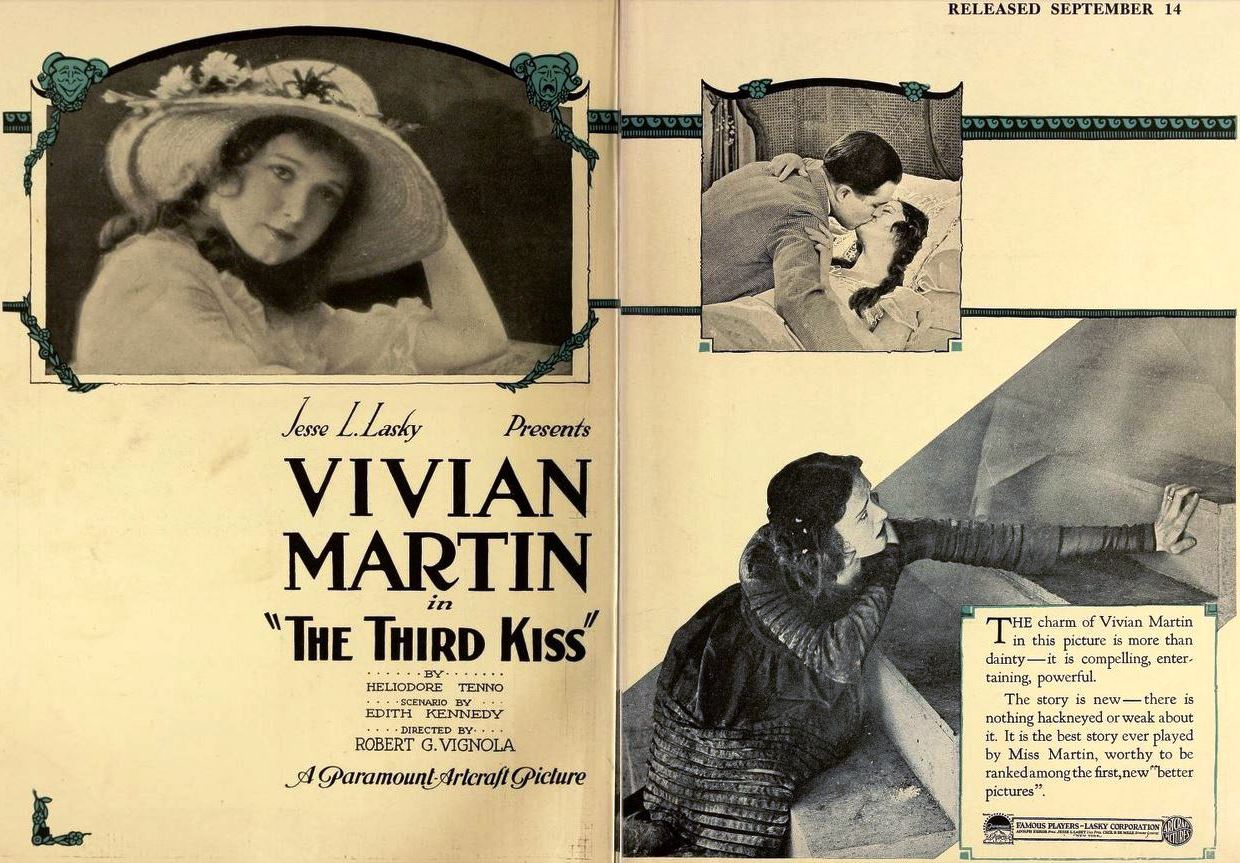
- Ad for film
- Directed by: Robert G. Vignola
- Screenplay by: Edith Kennedy; Heliodore Tenno
- Produced by: Jesse L. Lasky
- Starring: Vivian Martin; Harrison Ford; Robert Ellis; Kathleen Kirkham; Thomas Persse; Edna Mae Cooper; Jane Keckley
- Cinematography: Frank E. Garbutt
- Production company: Famous Players–Lasky Corporation
- Distributed by: Paramount Pictures
- Release date: September 14, 1919
- Running time: 50 minutes
- Country: United States
- Language: Silent (English intertitles)

The Third Kiss is a lost 1919 American silent comedy film directed by Robert G. Vignola, written by Edith M. Kennedy and Heliodore Tenno, and starring Vivian Martin, Harrison Ford, Robert Ellis, Kathleen Kirkham, Thomas Persse, Edna Mae Cooper, and Jane Keckley. It was released on September 14, 1919, by Paramount Pictures.

== Plot ==
As described in a film magazine, Rupert Bawlf is a settlement worker and has done wonders with the tough districts of the town. His wife Cynthia, although she loathes the work, cheerfully helps him because of her great love for him. Missy, a factory girl, by her knowledge of conditions, is able to help Oliver and he falls in love with her. To protect Bawlf's name from scandal, as mudslinging newspapers are watching, Oliver Cloyne, a millionaire who is keen on the work Bawlf is doing, persuades Missy to marry him although he is in love, hopelessly, with Mrs. Bawlf. Oliver learns that Missy is a granddaughter of the owner of the factory in which she works, having assumed the role of factory girl to assist in welfare work. After an imitation honeymoon, Oliver and his heiress bride, who is his wife in name only, return home where Rupert and Cynthia Bawlf seek them out. Cynthia, falling ill, goes away for a rest. Rupert persuades Missy to assist him in his welfare work, and when she agrees, he attempts to force his attentions upon her again. She resists, and shows him what a fool he is. While on an inspection tour of a new building, Missy is locked in by a crazed old woman who, as revenge for the death of her daughter in a factory fire, sets fire to the building to kill Missy in the same way. Oliver, first suspecting that Missy has run off with Rupert, learns the truth and rescues Missy from the fire.

== Cast ==
- Vivian Martin as Missy
- Harrison Ford as Oliver Cloyne
- Robert Ellis as Rupert Bawlf
- Kathleen Kirkham as Cynthia Bawlf
- Thomas Persse as Dr. Paton
- Edna Mae Cooper as Gwendolin Finn
- Jane Keckley as Mrs. Casey
