= Grounds for Divorce (1925 film) =

1925 film by Paul Bern

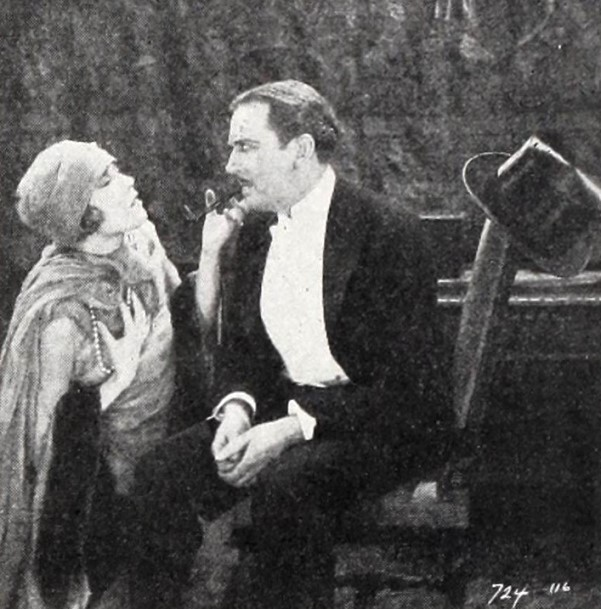
- Still with Fazenda and Moore
- Directed by: Paul Bern
- Screenplay by: Guy Bolton; Violet Clark; Ernest Vajda
- Produced by: Jesse L. Lasky; Adolph Zukor
- Starring: Florence Vidor; Matt Moore; Harry Myers; Louise Fazenda; George Beranger; Gustav von Seyffertitz
- Cinematography: Bert Glennon
- Production company: Famous Players–Lasky Corporation
- Distributed by: Paramount Pictures
- Release date: July 27, 1925
- Running time: 60 minutes
- Country: United States
- Language: Silent (English intertitles)

Grounds for Divorce is a 1925 American silent romantic comedy film directed by Paul Bern and written by Guy Bolton, Violet Clark, and Ernest Vajda. The film stars Florence Vidor, Matt Moore, Harry Myers, Louise Fazenda, George Beranger and Gustav von Seyffertitz. The film was released on July 27, 1925, by Paramount Pictures.

== Plot ==
Maurice Sorbier, one of the best known divorce lawyers in Paris, himself ends up divorcing his wife Alice. She remarries, with Count Zappata, to the great disappointment of one of her suitors, Guido, an aviator and well-known heartthrob. Alice soon realizes she doesn't love the count, but he refuses to give her a divorce. At Guido's suggestion, the lady turns to her ex-husband to ask him for advice but, above all, to have an excuse to see him again. Guido convinces the count to get on the plane with him and, once in flight, he terrifies him with a series of dangerous stunts to get him to sign a document that grants a divorce to Alice. Finally on the ground, Guido discovers disappointed that the woman has run away with Maurice. The aviator is left with nothing but the comfort of Marianne, an admirer who has been tormenting him for some time.

== Cast ==
- Florence Vidor as Alice Sorbier
- Matt Moore as Maurice Sorbier
- Harry Myers as Count Zappata
- Louise Fazenda as Marianne
- George Beranger as Guido
- Gustav von Seyffertitz as Labell
- Edna Mae Cooper as Marie
- Olive Borden as Model

== Preservation ==
The film survives in the Library of Congress collection incomplete as it is missing reel 3.
