= John Steppling (actor) =

American actor

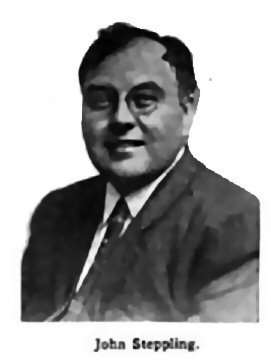
- Publicity shot from Moving Picture World; November 22, 1913
- Born: 8 August 1870; Essen, Rhine Province, Kingdom of Prussia
- Died: 5 April 1932 (aged 61); Hollywood, California

John Steppling (8 August 1870 in Essen, Kingdom of Prussia – 5 April 1932 in Hollywood, California) was a German-American silent film actor.

He moved to America at a young age and entered film in 1912 aged 42. He starred in a total of 230 films between then and 1928, beginning with one of the first feature films ever made, Tess of the d'Urbervilles. He is also credited with directing 7 films.

He is the grandfather of playwright John Steppling.

== Selected filmography ==
- Tess of the d'Urbervilles (1913)
- Caprice (1913)
- When a Woman Waits (1914)
- The Beggar Child (1914)
- The Archeologist (1914)
- A Slice of Life (1914)
- The Final Impulse (1914)
- Damaged Goods (1914)
- This Is th' Life (1914)
- The Butterfly (1914)
- The Lure of the Sawdust (1914)
- The Resolve (1915)
- The Promise (1917)
- A Man's Man (1918)
- The Guilty Man (1918)
- Good Night, Paul (1918)
- The Road Through the Dark (1918)
- Fools and Their Money (1919)
- Luck in Pawn (1919)
- Sick Abed (1920)
- Number 99 (1920)
- Live Sparks (1920)
- Madame Peacock (1920)
- Billions (1920)
- Black Beauty (1921)
- The Silver Car (1921)
- Garments of Truth (1921)
- Nobody's Kid (1921)
- The Hunch (1921)
- Extra! Extra! (1922)
- Too Much Business (1922)
- Confidence (1922)
- Glass Houses (1922)
- Bell Boy 13 (1923)
- Going Up (1923)
- Let's Go (1923)
- The Man Next Door (1923)
- A Cafe in Cairo (1924)
- The Reckless Age (1924)
- Fools in the Dark (1924)
- The Breathless Moment (1924)
- The Dramatic Life of Abraham Lincoln (1924)
- Soft Shoes (1925)
- California Straight Ahead (1925)
- Eve's Lover (1925)
- Memory Lane (1926)
- High Steppers (1926)
- Collegiate (1926)
- The Better Man (1926)
- By Whose Hand? (1927)
- Her Father Said No (1927)
- California or Bust (1927)
- Wedding Bills (1927)
- God's Great Wilderness (1927)
