= Henry Otto =

American silent film actor and director

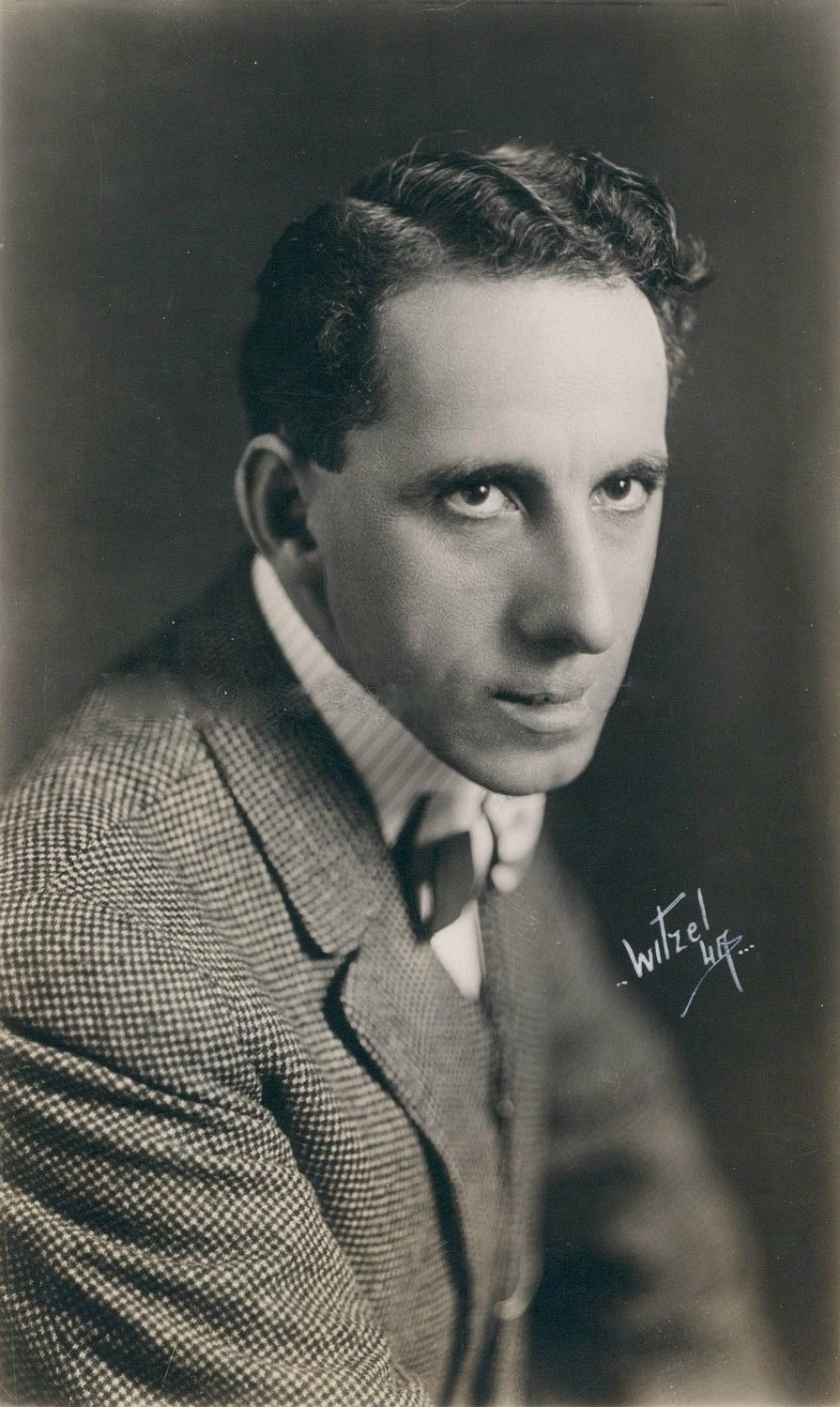
- Born: August 8, 1877; St. Louis, Missouri, United States
- Died: August 3, 1952 (aged 74); Los Angeles
- Other name: Henry W. Otto
- Occupations: Actor, director, producer, and screenwriter
- Years active: 1911–1942

Henry Otto (August 8, 1877 – August 3, 1952) was an American silent film actor, director, producer, and screenwriter.

Otto contributed to over 150 films throughout his career, working as an actor and a director throughout. He directed many films in 1914, in films such as When a Woman Waits, In Tune, The Archeologist, and The Redemption of a Pal working with actors such as Edward Coxen, Charlotte Burton and George Field. He retired from film in 1942.

Otto was found dead on August 4, 1952, in Los Angeles.

== Selected filmography ==
=== Actor ===
- Harbor Island (1912, Short) - General Arieno - Owner of Harbor Island
- The Lipton Cup: Introducing Sir Thomas Lipton (1913)
- Margarita and the Mission Funds (1913, Short) - Padre Sandez of the Mission
- Through the Centuries (1914, Short) - Amos Willing
- Elizabeth's Prayer (1914) - Richard Lee, A Sporty Acquaintance
- The Zaca Lake Mystery (1915, Short) - The Hunter
- Half a Rogue (1916) - Ex-Senator Henderson
- Mister 44 (1916) - Dick Westfall
- Lorelei of the Sea (1917) - John Grey
- The Outlaw Express (1926) - John Mills
- The Iron Mask (1929) - The King's Valet
- The Quitter (1929) - Dr. Abott
- One Hysterical Night (1929) - Dr. Hayden
- Sea Devils (1931) - Governor
- Svengali (1931) - Man with Opera Glasses (uncredited)
- Beware of Ladies (1936) - Plainclothesman (uncredited)
- The 13th Man (1937) - One Punch (uncredited)
- Here's Flash Casey (1938) - Dock Warden (uncredited)
- Silver Queen (1942) - Fight Spectator (uncredited)
- Sweet Rosie O'Grady (1943) - Minor Role (uncredited) (final film role)

=== Director ===
- Betty's Bandit (1912)
- Beppo (1914)
- The Measure of Leon Du Bray (1915)
- The Castle Ranch (1915)
- Undine (1916)
- The River of Romance (1916)
- Mister 44 (1916)
- Big Tremaine (1916)
- The River of Romance (1916)
- The Butterfly Girl (1917)
- Their Honeymoon Baby (1918)
- Wild Life (1918)
- The Island of Intrigue (1919)
- The Amateur Adventuress (1919)
- The Great Romance (1919)
- Fair and Warmer (1919)
- The Microbe (1919)
- The Great Victory (1919)
- The Willow Tree (1920)
- The Cheater (1920)
- A Slave of Vanity (1920)
- Lovebound (1923)
- The Temple of Venus (1923)
- Dante's Inferno (1924)
- The Folly of Vanity (1924)
- The Ancient Mariner (1925)
- Alma de Gaucho (1930)

=== Writer ===
- Memories of the Past (1911)
- Oh, Such a Night! (1912)
- All on Account of a Transfer (1913)
- Lola (Scenario, 1914)
- The Phantom Fortune (Scenario, 1915)
- Half a Rogue (Scenario, 1916)
- The River of Romance (Scenario, 1916)
- Big Tremaine (1916)
- A Slave of Vanity (Scenario, 1920)
- The Temple of Venus (Story, 1923)
