= List of Paramount Pictures films (1912–1919) =

The following is a list of films originally produced and/or distributed theatrically by Paramount Pictures and released between 1912 and 1919.

== Key ==
#	Considered to be lost.

== 1912 ==
Release date	Title	Notes
July 12, 1912	The Loves of Queen Elizabeth	First feature film released as Famous Players Film Company
October 1912	Resurrection ^{#}	

== 1913 ==
Release date	Title	Notes
February 18, 1913	The Prisoner of Zenda	
September 1, 1913	Tess of the d'Urbervilles ^{#}	incomplete, fragment survives
September 10, 1913	In the Bishop's Carriage ^{#}	
September 20, 1913	Chelsea 7750	
October 20, 1913	An Hour Before Dawn ^{#}	
October 1913	His Neighbor's Wife ^{#}	
November 1, 1913	The Count of Monte Cristo	
November 10, 1913	Caprice ^{#}	
November 20, 1913	The Port of Doom ^{#}	
December 7, 1913	The Sea Wolf ^{#}	It is debatable whether this film has anything to do with Adolph Zukor or Famous Players.
December 10, 1913	Leah Kleschna ^{#}	
December 20, 1913	The Daughter of the Hills ^{#}	
December 27, 1913	A Lady of Quality ^{#}	

== 1914 ==
Release date	Title	Notes
January 10, 1914	An American Citizen ^{#}	
January 20, 1914	The Day of Days ^{#}	
February 10, 1914	Hearts Adrift ^{#}	
February 12, 1914	The Squaw Man	a Jesse L. Lasky production
February 20, 1914	The Pride of Jennico ^{#}	
March 1, 1914	A Good Little Devil ^{#}	incomplete, fragment survives (1 reel)
March 10, 1914	Clothes ^{#}	
March 30, 1914	Tess of the Storm Country	Inducted into the National Film Registry in 2006
April 10, 1914	The Redemption of David Corson ^{#}	
April 15, 1914	Brewster's Millions ^{#}	
April 27, 1914	The Brute ^{#}	
May 1, 1914	The Port of Missing Men ^{#}	
May 10, 1914	A Woman's Triumph ^{#}	
May 11, 1914	The Master Mind ^{#}	
May 20, 1914	The Ring and the Man ^{#}	
June 10, 1914	One of Our Girls ^{#}	
June 15, 1914	The Only Son ^{#}	
June 20, 1914	The Spitfire ^{#}	
June 22, 1914	Valley of the Moon ^{#}	
July 5, 1914	The Eagle's Mate	
July 10, 1914	The Little Gray Lady ^{#}	
July 13, 1914	The Man on the Box	
July 20, 1914	The Scales of Justice ^{#}	
July 1914	John Barleycorn ^{#}	
August 10, 1914	The Call of the North	
August 16, 1914	Martin Eden	incomplete, missing reels 3 & 4
August 20, 1914	The Better Man ^{#}	
August 20, 1914	Aftermath ^{#}	
September 1, 1914	The Lost Paradise ^{#}	Paramount's first release
September 3, 1914	An Odyssey of the North ^{#}	
September 7, 1914	The Virginian	
September 10, 1914	The Unwelcome Mrs. Hatch ^{#}	
September 14, 1914	Burning Daylight: The Adventures of 'Burning Daylight' in Alaska ^{#}	
September 17, 1914	The Making of Bobby Burnit ^{#}	
September 21, 1914	Such a Little Queen ^{#}	
September 28, 1914	The Patchwork Girl of Oz	
September 28, 1914	His Majesty, the Scarecrow of Oz	
September 28, 1914	The Magic Cloak of Oz	
October 1, 1914	The Pursuit of the Phantom ^{#}	
October 5, 1914	Marta of the Lowlands ^{#}	
October 10, 1914	The Typhoon	
October 12, 1914	Where the Trail Divides ^{#}	
October 15, 1914	Wildflower ^{#}	
October 19, 1914	The County Chairman ^{#}	
October 22, 1914	What's His Name	
October 26, 1914	Behind the Scenes	
October 29, 1914	His Last Dollar ^{#}	
October 1914	Burning Daylight: The Adventures of 'Burning Daylight' in Civilization ^{#}	
November 2, 1914	The Man from Mexico ^{#}	
November 5, 1914	Ready Money	
November 9, 1914	The Man from Home	
November 12, 1914	The Straight Road	
November 15, 1914	Rose of the Rancho	
November 19, 1914	The Circus Man	
November 23, 1914	The Country Mouse ^{#}	
November 26, 1914	Aristocracy ^{#}	
November 30, 1914	Mrs. Black Is Back ^{#}	
December 3, 1914	The Bargain	Inducted into the National Film Registry in 2010
December 7, 1914	The Ghost Breaker ^{#}	
December 10, 1914	The Conspiracy ^{#}	
December 14, 1914	The Crucible ^{#}	
December 17, 1914	False Colors	held by the Library of Congress but not in LoC/FIAF database as it is considered a short at 4 reels. It is in the Cat. of Holdings as of 1978.
December 21, 1914	The Sign of the Cross	incomplete: reel 1 missing
December 24, 1914	Cameo Kirby ^{#}	
December 28, 1914	Cinderella	
December 31, 1914	The Million ^{#}	

== 1915 ==
Release date	Title	Notes
January 4, 1915	The Girl of the Golden West	
January 11, 1915	The Dancing Girl ^{#}	
January 14, 1915	It's No Laughing Matter ^{#}	Incomplete
January 18, 1915	The Morals of Marcus ^{#}	
January 21, 1915	Young Romance	
January 25, 1915	The Goose Girl ^{#}	
January 28, 1915	After Five ^{#}	Jesse L. Lasky Feature Play Company production; based on the play by Cecil B. DeMille and William C. deMille
January 20, 1915	Hypocrites	
February 1, 1915	Mistress Nell	
February 4, 1915	Buckshot John	
February 8, 1915	Her Triumph ^{#}	fragment exists
February 11, 1915	The Bachelor's Romance ^{#}	
February 15, 1915	The Warrens of Virginia	
February 18, 1915	The Country Boy ^{#}	
February 22, 1915	David Harum	
February 25, 1915	The Love Route ^{#}	
March 1, 1915	A Gentleman of Leisure	
March 4, 1915	Rule G ^{#}	
March 8, 1915	The Caprices of Kitty	
March 14, 1915	The Governor's Lady	
March 15, 1915	Gretna Green ^{#}	
March 18, 1915	Sunshine Molly	
March 22, 1915	Are You a Mason? ^{#}	
March 25, 1915	The Commanding Officer ^{#}	
March 29, 1915	Pretty Mrs. Smith ^{#}	
April 1, 1915	The Unafraid	
April 4, 1915	Niobe ^{#}	
April 5, 1915	When We Were Twenty-One ^{#}	
April 11, 1915	The Spanish Jade ^{#}	
April 12, 1915	The Eternal City ^{#}	
April 12, 1915	Snobs	
April 15, 1915	May Blossom ^{#}	
April 19, 1915	Captain Courtesy ^{#}	
April 22, 1915	The Captive	
April 29, 1915	Help Wanted ^{#}	
May 3, 1915	The Woman ^{#}	fragment
May 6, 1915	The House of the Lost Court ^{#}	
May 6, 1915	Little Sunset ^{#}	
May 10, 1915	Fanchon the Cricket	
May 13, 1915	The Moth and the Flame ^{#}	
May 17, 1915	Betty in Search of a Thrill ^{#}	
May 24, 1915	Stolen Goods ^{#}	
May 27, 1915	The Wild Goose Chase ^{#}	
May 31, 1915	The Pretty Sister of Jose ^{#}	
June 3, 1915	Jim the Penman ^{#}	
June 7, 1915	The Dawn of a Tomorrow	
June 10, 1915	Brother Officers ^{#}	
June 14, 1915	The Arab	
June 17, 1915	Gambier's Advocate ^{#}	
June 18, 1915	The Italian	Inducted into the National Film Registry in 1991
June 21, 1915	The Dictator ^{#}	
June 24, 1915	The Wild Olive ^{#}	
June 28, 1915	Chimmie Fadden	
July 1, 1915	Little Pal	
July 5, 1915	The Rug Maker's Daughter ^{#}	incomplete, fragment survives (432 ft)
July 8, 1915	The Clue ^{#}	
July 12, 1915	Kindling	
July 15, 1915	The Running Fight	
July 19, 1915	The Fighting Hope ^{#}	survives in incomplete form
July 22, 1915	Kilmeny	
July 26, 1915	The Seven Sisters ^{#}	
July 29, 1915	The Puppet Crown ^{#}	
August 2, 1915	Rags	
August 5, 1915	Sold ^{#}	
August 9, 1915	The Secret Orchard ^{#}	
August 12, 1915	Nearly a Lady ^{#}	
August 16, 1915	The Marriage of Kitty ^{#}	
August 19, 1915	Helene of the North ^{#}	
August 23, 1915	Poor Schmaltz ^{#}	
August 26, 1915	The Majesty of the Law	
August 30, 1915	The Heart of Jennifer ^{#}	
August 1915	The Foundling ^{#}	
September 2, 1915	The Incorrigible Dukane	
September 6, 1915	Esmerelda ^{#}	
September 9, 1915	Out of the Darkness	
September 13, 1915	The Case of Becky	
September 16, 1915	Peer Gynt	
September 23, 1915	'Twas Ever Thus ^{#}	
September 27, 1915	The Voice in the Fog ^{#}	
September 27, 1915	The Explorer ^{#}	
September 30, 1915	The Fatal Card ^{#}	
October 7, 1915	A Girl of Yesterday ^{#}	
October 11, 1915	The White Pearl ^{#}	
October 14, 1915	Blackbirds	
October 18, 1915	The Chorus Lady ^{#}	
October 21, 1915	The Secret Sin	
October 25, 1915	The Yankee Girl	
October 28, 1915	The Masqueraders ^{#}	
October 31, 1915	Carmen	
November 4, 1915	Still Waters ^{#}	
November 7, 1915	Madame Butterfly	
November 11, 1915	Zaza ^{#}	
November 11, 1915	The Mummy and the Hummingbird ^{#}	
November 15, 1915	Bella Donna ^{#}	
November 15, 1915	Armstrong's Wife ^{#}	
November 21, 1915	Chimmie Fadden Out West	
November 28, 1915	The Gentleman from Indiana	
November 29, 1915	The Prince and the Pauper ^{#}	
December 2, 1915	Mr. Grex of Monte Carlo	
December 6, 1915	Jane	
December 9, 1915	The Unknown	
December 13, 1915	The Cheat	Inducted into the National Film Registry in 1993
December 16, 1915	The Reform Candidate	
December 20, 1915	The Immigrant ^{#}	
December 26, 1915	The Old Homestead	
December 26, 1915	Lydia Gilmore ^{#}	
December 30, 1915	The Golden Chance	
December 30, 1915	Temptation ^{#}	

== 1916 ==
Release date	Title	Notes
January 2, 1916	The Foundling^{#}	
January 6, 1916	The Tongues of Men	
January 10, 1916	Mice and Men^{#}	
January 17, 1916	My Lady Incog^{#}	
January 23, 1916	The Ragamuffin	
January 23, 1916	The Call of the Cumberlands	
January 27, 1916	The Spider^{#}	
January 31, 1916	Pudd'nhead Wilson^{#}	
February 6, 1916	Tennessee's Pardner	
February 6, 1916	Madame la Presidente	
February 10, 1916	Nearly a King^{#}	
February 13, 1916	The Trail of the Lonesome Pine	
February 17, 1916	He Fell in Love with His Wife	
February 20, 1916	The Blacklist^{#}	
February 24, 1916	Out of the Drifts^{#}	
February 27, 1916	Diplomacy^{#}	incomplete, fragment survives
March 2, 1916	Poor Little Peppina	
March 5, 1916	To Have and to Hold^{#}	
March 9, 1916	Ben Blair	
March 12, 1916	For the Defense	
March 16, 1916	The Code of Marcia Gray	
March 20, 1916	The Lost Bridegroom^{#}	
March 23, 1916	The Saleslady^{#}	
March 26, 1916	Audrey^{#}	
March 30, 1916	The Sowers	
April 2, 1916	The Heart of Paula	
April 6, 1916	The Race^{#}	
April 13, 1916	The Love Mask^{#}	
April 16, 1916	Molly Make-Believe^{#}	
April 16, 1916	The Smugglers^{#}	incomplete, fragment survives
April 17, 1916	The Eternal Grind	
April 23, 1916	The Heart of Nora Flynn	
April 27, 1916	The Moment Before	
April 30, 1916	David Garrick^{#}	
May 4, 1916	The Red Widow^{#}	
May 7, 1916	Maria Rosa	
May 8, 1916	The Innocent Lie^{#}	
May 11, 1916	Alien Souls^{#}	Considered lost
May 14, 1916	The Feud Girl^{#}	
May 21, 1916	Pasquale	
May 22, 1916	Sweet Kitty Bellairs^{#}	
May 25, 1916	Saints and Sinners^{#}	
May 28, 1916	The Thousand-Dollar Husband^{#}	
June 4, 1916	A Gutter Magdalene^{#}	
June 5, 1916	The Evil Thereof^{#}	
June 8, 1916	The Making of Maddalena	
June 12, 1916	Silks and Satins	
June 15, 1916	Destiny's Toy	
June 19, 1916	The Clown^{#}	
June 22, 1916	Susie Snowflake^{#}	
June 25, 1916	The World's Great Snare^{#}	
June 29, 1916	The American Beauty^{#}	Distribution only; produced by Pallas Pictures
July 2, 1916	The Dupe^{#}	First film after the Famous Players–Lasky Corporation merger.
July 9, 1916	The Selfish Woman^{#}	
July 16, 1916	Davy Crockett^{#}	
July 17, 1916	The Dream Girl^{#}	
July 20, 1916	Under Cover^{#}	
July 23, 1916	An International Marriage	
July 30, 1916	Common Ground	
July 30, 1916	Hulda from Holland	
August 3, 1916	Little Lady Eileen^{#}	
August 6, 1916	The Woman in the Case^{#}	survives in incomplete form
August 10, 1916	The House with the Golden Windows^{#}	
August 13, 1916	The Stronger Love^{#}	incomplete, fragment
August 20, 1916	Public Opinion	
August 21, 1916	Rolling Stones^{#}	fragment
August 27, 1916	The Victory of Conscience	
August 27, 1916	The Honorable Friend^{#}	
August 31, 1916	The Daughter of MacGregor^{#}	
August 31, 1916	Each Pearl a Tear	
September 3, 1916	The Parson of Panamint^{#}	
September 7, 1916	The Big Sister^{#}	
September 10, 1916	The Reward of Patience^{#}	
September 14, 1916	The House of Lies	
September 21, 1916	Ashes of Embers^{#}	
September 25, 1916	The Quest of Life^{#}	
September 28, 1916	Anton the Terrible^{#}	fragment
October 1, 1916	The Lash^{#}	
October 5, 1916	The Storm^{#}	
October 9, 1916	The Intrigue	
October 12, 1916	Her Father's Son	
October 16, 1916	Witchcraft^{#}	
October 19, 1916	The Kiss	
October 22, 1916	The Rainbow Princess^{#}	
October 26, 1916	The Heir to the Hoorah	
October 30, 1916	The Soul of Kura San^{#}	
November 2, 1916	Seventeen^{#}	
November 5, 1916	Less Than the Dust	
November 6, 1916	Unprotected^{#}	
November 9, 1916	A Son of Erin	
November 13, 1916	The Plow Girl^{#}	
November 16, 1916	The Years of the Locust	
November 19, 1916	Miss George Washington^{#}	
November 23, 1916	The Yellow Pawn^{#}	
November 26, 1916	Nanette of the Wilds^{#}	
November 30, 1916	The Martyrdom of Philip Strong^{#}	
December 4, 1916	A Coney Island Princess^{#}	
December 7, 1916	The Road to Love	
December 10, 1916	Oliver Twist^{#}	
December 14, 1916	The Victoria Cross	
December 17, 1916	The Traveling Salesman^{#}	
December 21, 1916	The Right Direction^{#}	
December 25, 1916	Snow White	
December 25, 1916	Joan the Woman	
December 28, 1916	Redeeming Love	

== 1917 ==
Release date	Title	Notes
January 1, 1917	The Slave Market^{#}	
January 4, 1917	The Evil Eye	
January 7, 1917	The Pride of the Clan	
January 8, 1917	Great Expectations^{#}	
January 15, 1917	Betty to the Rescue^{#}	
January 18, 1917	Happiness of Three Women	
January 18, 1917	A Girl Like That^{#}	
January 21, 1917	Lost and Won	
January 25, 1917	The Golden Fetter	
January 29, 1917	His Sweetheart	
February 1, 1917	The Wax Model^{#}	
February 5, 1917	Each to His Kind^{#}	
February 8, 1917	Her Own People^{#}	
February 12, 1917	The Black Wolf^{#}	
February 15, 1917	The American Consul	
February 19, 1917	The Winning of Sally Temple	
February 22, 1917	On Record^{#}	
February 26, 1917	The Fortunes of Fifi^{#}	
March 1, 1917	Those Without Sin^{#}	
March 5, 1917	Castles for Two	
March 5, 1917	The Poor Little Rich Girl	Inducted into the National Film Registry in 1991
March 8, 1917	Out of the Wreck	
March 11, 1917	Sapho^{#}	
March 15, 1917	The Prison Without Walls^{#}	
March 19, 1917	The Dummy^{#}	
March 22, 1917	The Spirit of Romance^{#}	
March 26, 1917	The Bottle Imp	
March 29, 1917	As Men Love^{#}	
April 2, 1917	The Bond Between	
April 2, 1917	Broadway Jones^{#}	
April 5, 1917	A School for Husbands^{#}	
April 9, 1917	The Cost of Hatred^{#}	
April 12, 1917	The Tides of Barnegat^{#}	
April 15, 1917	Sleeping Fires^{#}	
April 19, 1917	The Lonesome Chap	
April 22, 1917	The Valentine Girl^{#}	
April 22, 1917	A Mormon Maid	
April 26, 1917	The Girl at Home	
April 30, 1917	Heart's Desire	
April 30, 1917	In Again, Out Again	
May 3, 1917	Sacrifice^{#}	incomplete (fragment)
May 7, 1917	The Primrose Ring^{#}	
May 10, 1917	The Silent Partner^{#}	
May 14, 1917	The Marcellini Millions	
May 14, 1917	A Romance of the Redwoods	
May 17, 1917	The Highway of Hope^{#}	
May 21, 1917	Her Better Self^{#}	
May 24, 1917	The Undying Flame^{#}	
May 28, 1917	Freckles^{#}	
May 31, 1917	Unconquered^{#}	
June 4, 1917	The World Apart^{#}	
June 7, 1917	Giving Becky a Chance^{#}	
June 11, 1917	The Jaguar's Claws^{#}	
June 14, 1917	The Inner Shrine^{#}	
June 18, 1917	A Roadside Impresario^{#}	
June 18, 1917	The Little Boy Scout^{#}	
June 21, 1917	The Heir of the Ages	
June 24, 1917	Wild and Woolly	Inducted into the National Film Registry in 2002
June 25, 1917	Her Strange Wedding^{#}	
July 2, 1917	At First Sight^{#}	
July 5, 1917	Big Timber^{#}	
July 9, 1917	The Love That Lives	
July 12, 1917	Forbidden Paths	
July 16, 1917	What Money Can't Buy^{#}	
July 19, 1917	The Cook of Canyon Camp^{#}	
July 23, 1917	The Long Trail^{#}	
July 26, 1917	The Squaw Man's Son^{#}	
July 30, 1917	The Crystal Gazer^{#}	
August 2, 1917	A Kiss for Susie^{#}	
August 5, 1917	The Varmint^{#}	
August 5, 1917	The Amazons^{#}	
August 12, 1917	The Law of the Land^{#}	
August 12, 1917	Down to Earth	
August 19, 1917	Hashimura Togo^{#}	
August 26, 1917	Little Miss Optimist^{#}	
August 27, 1917	The Little American	
September 3, 1917	Lost in Transit^{#}	
September 10, 1917	The Hostage^{#}	
September 10, 1917	On the Level^{#}	
September 10, 1917	Barbary Sheep^{#}	
September 16, 1917	The Countess Charming^{#}	
September 16, 1917	Double Crossed^{#}	
September 22, 1917	Rebecca of Sunnybrook Farm	
September 1917	The Mysterious Miss Terry^{#}	
September 1917	Exile^{#}	
October 1, 1917	The Ghost House^{#}	
October 1, 1917	The Man from Painted Post	
October 7, 1917	Bab's Diary^{#}	
October 8, 1917	The Trouble Buster^{#}	
October 13, 1917	The Sunset Trail	
October 14, 1917	Arms and the Girl	
October 15, 1917	The Call of the East^{#}	
October 17, 1917	Seven Keys to Baldpate	
October 21, 1917	The Price Mark	
October 22, 1917	The Son of His Father	
October 28, 1917	Bab's Burglar^{#}	
October 28, 1917	The Woman God Forgot^{#}	
November 5, 1917	The Hungry Heart^{#}	
November 5, 1917	The Clever Mrs. Carfax^{#}	
November 5, 1917	The Antics of Ann^{#}	
November 11, 1917	The Rise of Jennie Cushing^{#}	
November 11, 1917	A Little Princess	
November 12, 1917	Jack and Jill^{#}	
November 17, 1917	Reaching for the Moon	
November 19, 1917	The Judgment House^{#}	
November 19, 1917	Molly Entangled^{#}	
November 26, 1917	Bab's Matinee Idol^{#}	
November 26, 1917	The Silent Man	
December 3, 1917	The Secret Game	
December 9, 1917	The Land of Promise^{#}	
December 9, 1917	The Eternal Temptress^{#}	
December 10, 1917	Tom Sawyer	
December 12, 1917	Nan of Music Mountain^{#}	
December 16, 1917	The Devil-Stone^{#}	incomplete
December 17, 1917	The Fair Barbarian	
December 24, 1917	Love Letters	
December 24, 1917	His Mother's Boy	
December 30, 1917	The Narrow Trail	
December 30, 1917	A Modern Musketeer	
December 31, 1917	The Seven Swans^{#}	

== 1918 ==
Release date	Title	Notes
January 7, 1918	Mrs. Dane's Defense^{#}	
January 7, 1918	Rose of the World	
January 14, 1918	Jules of the Strong Heart^{#}	
January 14, 1918	Wolves of the Rail	
January 21, 1918	The World for Sale^{#}	
January 21, 1918	Rimrock Jones^{#}	
January 21, 1918	Stella Maris	
January 26, 1918	The Spirit of '17^{#}	
January 27, 1918	The Hired Man	
January 28, 1918	The Widow's Might^{#}	
February 1, 1918	'Blue Blazes' Rawden	
February 4, 1918	Flare-Up Sal	
February 4, 1918	Madame Jealousy^{#}	
February 4, 1918	A Petticoat Pilot^{#}	
February 11, 1918	The Lincoln Cycle	
February 11, 1918	The Things We Love^{#}	
February 18, 1918	The Guilty Man^{#}	
February 18, 1918	The Hidden Pearls	
February 18, 1918	Keys of the Righteous	
February 18, 1918	The Song of Songs^{#}	
February 25, 1918	One More American^{#}	
February 25, 1918	Headin' South^{#}	
March 4, 1918	Eve's Daughter^{#}	
March 11, 1918	Sunshine Nan	
March 11, 1918	Amarilly of Clothes-Line Alley	
March 12, 1918	Hearts of the World	
March 18, 1918	Wild Youth^{#}	
March 18, 1918	Love Me	
March 25, 1918	Naughty, Naughty^{#}	
March 25, 1918	La Tosca^{#}	
March 28, 1918	The Whispering Chorus	
March 31, 1918	The Family Skeleton	
March 31, 1918	The Blue Bird	Inducted into the National Film Registry in 2004
April 1, 1918	The Honor of His House	
April 1, 1918	The Tiger Man	
April 8, 1918	The House of Silence^{#}	
April 8, 1918	His Majesty, Bunker Bean^{#}	
April 14, 1918	Unclaimed Goods^{#}	
April 14, 1918	The Lie^{#}	
April 15, 1918	Mr. Fix-It	
April 22, 1918	Rich Man, Poor Man^{#}	
April 28, 1918	The Biggest Show on Earth	
April 28, 1918	Let's Get a Divorce^{#}	
April 29, 1918	Tyrant Fear^{#}	incomplete/fragment
May 5, 1918	Playing the Game^{#}	
May 5, 1918	M'Liss	
May 6, 1918	The White Man's Law	
May 12, 1918	Selfish Yates	
May 13, 1918	Mile-a-Minute Kendall^{#}	
May 13, 1918	Huck and Tom	
May 19, 1918	Resurrection^{#}	
May 19, 1918	Old Wives for New	
May 20, 1918	The Mating of Marcella^{#}	
May 21, 1918	Love's Conquest^{#}	
May 27, 1918	His Own Home Town^{#}	
June 2, 1918	Believe Me, Xantippe^{#}	
June 2, 1918	Prunella^{#}	incomplete
June 2, 1918	A Doll's House^{#}	
June 9, 1918	Viviette^{#}	
June 9, 1918	Hit-The-Trail Holliday^{#}	
June 16, 1918	The Bravest Way^{#}	
June 16, 1918	Missing^{#}	
June 16, 1918	Say! Young Fellow^{#}	
June 23, 1918	Her Final Reckoning^{#}	
June 23, 1918	A Desert Wooing	
June 30, 1918	The Claws of the Hun^{#}	
June 30, 1918	Shark Monroe	
June 30, 1918	How Could You, Jean?^{#}	
July 1, 1918	The Kaiser's Shadow^{#}	
July 7, 1918	The Firefly of France^{#}	
July 7, 1918	The Danger Mark^{#}	
July 7, 1918	We Can't Have Everything^{#}	
July 14, 1918	Sandy^{#}	
July 15, 1918	Uncle Tom's Cabin^{#}	fragment
July 15, 1918	The City of Dim Faces^{#}	
July 21, 1918	Less Than Kin^{#}	
July 22, 1918	The Vamp^{#}	
July 28, 1918	A Nine O'Clock Town^{#}	
July 28, 1918	Bound in Morocco^{#}	
August 3, 1918	Riddle Gawne^{#}	
August 4, 1918	Fedora^{#}	
August 11, 1918	Green Eyes^{#}	
August 11, 1918	The Great Love^{#}	
August 18, 1918	Heart of the Wilds^{#}	
August 25, 1918	The Hun Within	
August 25, 1918	Till I Come Back to You	
August 26, 1918	The Marriage Ring^{#}	
August 26, 1918	Coals of Fire^{#}	
September 1, 1918	The Cruise of the Make-Believes^{#}	
September 1, 1918	In Pursuit of Polly^{#}	
September 1, 1918	On the Quiet^{#}	
September 8, 1918	The Source^{#}	
September 8, 1918	The Girl Who Came Back	
September 8, 1918	He Comes Up Smiling	
September 15, 1918	Johanna Enlists	
September 15, 1918	Vive la France!	
September 22, 1918	Out of a Clear Sky^{#}	
September 22, 1918	Her Country First^{#}	
September 22, 1918	Come on In^{#}	
September 29, 1918	The Border Wireless^{#}	
September 29, 1918	The Law of the North^{#}	
September 29, 1918	Battling Jane^{#}	
September 29, 1918	The Goat^{#}	
October 6, 1918	The Man from Funeral Range^{#}	
October 6, 1918	Such a Little Pirate^{#}	
October 13, 1918	When Do We Eat?	
October 13, 1918	Private Peat^{#}	
October 20, 1918	A Woman of Impulse^{#}	
November 10, 1918	Little Women^{#}	
November 17, 1918	The Make-Believe Wife^{#}	
November 17, 1918	The Gypsy Trail^{#}	
November 24, 1918	Women's Weapons^{#}	
November 24, 1918	A Daughter of the Old South^{#}	
November 24, 1918	My Cousin	
December 8, 1918	Too Many Millions^{#}	
December 8, 1918	Fuss and Feathers^{#}	
December 8, 1918	Arizona^{#}	
December 8, 1918	Under the Greenwood Tree^{#}	
December 15, 1918	Mirandy Smiles^{#}	
December 15, 1918	Branding Broadway	
December 15, 1918	Good-Bye, Bill^{#}	
December 15, 1918	The Squaw Man^{#}	incomplete
December 16, 1918	The Greatest Thing in Life^{#}	
December 22, 1918	The Mystery Girl^{#}	
December 22, 1918	Quicksand^{#}	
December 29, 1918	The Way of a Man with a Maid^{#}	
December 29, 1918	The Hope Chest^{#}	
December 29, 1918	String Beans^{#}	
December 29, 1918	Little Miss Hoover	
December 1918	The Sporting Life^{#}	

== 1919 ==
Release date	Title	Notes
January 5, 1919	Jane Goes A-Wooing^{#}	
January 5, 1919	Under the Top^{#}	fragment
January 5, 1919	Out of the Shadow^{#}	
January 12, 1919	The Secret Garden^{#}	
January 12, 1919	The Silver King^{#}	
January 19, 1919	Here Comes the Bride^{#}	
January 19, 1919	The Dub^{#}	
January 19, 1919	His Parisian Wife^{#}	
January 26, 1919	Venus in the East^{#}	
January 26, 1919	Don't Change Your Husband	
January 26, 1919	A Romance of Happy Valley	
February 2, 1919	Hard Boiled	
February 2, 1919	Breed of Men	
February 9, 1919	The Two Brides^{#}	
February 16, 1919	The False Faces	
February 16, 1919	You Never Saw Such a Girl^{#}	
February 16, 1919	Mrs. Wiggs of the Cabbage Patch	
February 23, 1919	The Girl Dodger^{#}	
February 23, 1919	The Winning Girl^{#}	
February 23, 1919	Paid in Full^{#}	
February 23, 1919	Maggie Pepper^{#}	
February 23, 1919	Happy Though Married^{#}	
March 2, 1919	Puppy Love^{#}	
March 2, 1919	Alias Mike Moran^{#}	
March 9, 1919	The Poor Boob^{#}	
March 9, 1919	Boots^{#}	
March 16, 1919	The Poppy Girl's Husband	
March 16, 1919	Extravagance^{#}	
March 16, 1919	The Marriage Price^{#}	
March 16, 1919	Johnny Get Your Gun	
March 23, 1919	The Girl Who Stayed at Home	
March 23, 1919	Pettigrew's Girl^{#}	
March 23, 1919	Partners Three	
March 30, 1919	Three Men and a Girl^{#}	
March 30, 1919	Good Gracious, Annabelle^{#}	
March 30, 1919	The Sheriff's Son^{#}	
March 30, 1919	Little Comrade^{#}	
April 6, 1919	The Test of Honor^{#}	
April 6, 1919	The Rescuing Angel^{#}	
April 6, 1919	Peppy Polly^{#}	
April 6, 1919	Captain Kidd, Jr.^{#}	incomplete
April 13, 1919	Something to Do^{#}	
April 20, 1919	The Homebreaker^{#}	
April 20, 1919	The Money Corral^{#}	
April 20, 1919	Eyes of the Soul^{#}	
April 23, 1919	Let's Elope^{#}	
April 27, 1919	The Law of Men^{#}	
April 27, 1919	Rustling a Bride^{#}	
April 27, 1919	For Better, for Worse	
April 27, 1919	The Roaring Road	
April 27, 1919	Greased Lightning	
May 4, 1919	Oh, You Women!^{#}	
May 11, 1919	The Home Town Girl^{#}	
May 11, 1919	Come Out of the Kitchen^{#}	
May 18, 1919	The Woman Next Door^{#}	
May 18, 1919	The Lady of Red Butte^{#}	
May 18, 1919	The Final Close-Up^{#}	
May 18, 1919	The Busher	
May 18, 1919	I'll Get Him Yet^{#}	
May 18, 1919	The Knickerbocker Buckaroo^{#}	
May 25, 1919	The Haunted Bedroom^{#}	
June 1, 1919	Putting It Over^{#}	
June 1, 1919	True Heart Susie	
June 1, 1919	The Splendid Romance^{#}	
June 8, 1919	An Innocent Adventuress^{#}	
June 8, 1919	You're Fired	
June 8, 1919	The Woman Thou Gavest Me^{#}	
June 15, 1919	Secret Service^{#}	
June 15, 1919	Other Men's Wives^{#}	
June 15, 1919	Men, Women, and Money^{#}	
June 15, 1919	Square Deal Sanderson	
June 22, 1919	Hay Foot, Straw Foot^{#}	
June 22, 1919	A Daughter of the Wolf^{#}	
June 22, 1919	The Avalanche^{#}	
June 29, 1919	Girls^{#}	
June 29, 1919	The White Heather	
July 6, 1919	A Very Good Young Man^{#}	
July 6, 1919	The Firing Line^{#}	
July 13, 1919	The Love Burglar^{#}	
July 13, 1919	A Sporting Chance	
July 20, 1919	Rose o' the River^{#}	
July 20, 1919	Louisiana^{#}	
July 27, 1919	Nugget Nell^{#}	
July 29, 1919	Wagon Tracks	
August 3, 1919	Fires of Faith^{#}	
August 3, 1919	The Career of Katherine Bush^{#}	
August 3, 1919	The Dark Star^{#}	
August 10, 1919	The Virtuous Thief^{#}	
August 17, 1919	Love Insurance^{#}	
August 17, 1919	Bill Henry	
August 17, 1919	A Society Exile^{#}	
August 24, 1919	The Heart of Youth^{#}	
August 24, 1919	Nobody Home^{#}	
August 25, 1919	The Grim Game	
August 29, 1919	The Miracle Man^{#}	fragment
August 31, 1919	The Valley of the Giants	
September 7, 1919	The Misleading Widow^{#}	
September 7, 1919	The Market of Souls	
September 14, 1919	The Third Kiss^{#}	
September 14, 1919	The Witness for the Defense	
September 21, 1919	Told in the Hills	
September 21, 1919	Stepping Out^{#}	
September 28, 1919	Widow by Proxy^{#}	
September 28, 1919	The Life Line	
September 28, 1919	The Egg Crate Wallop	
October 5, 1919	In Mizzoura^{#}	
October 12, 1919	The Lottery Man^{#}	
October 16, 1919	His Official Fiancée^{#}	
October 19, 1919	Why Smith Left Home	incomplete; missing reel 3
October 19, 1919	The Mystery of the Yellow Room	
October 19, 1919	Sadie Love^{#}	
November 2, 1919	Turning the Tables^{#}	
November 2, 1919	The Teeth of the Tiger^{#}	
November 2, 1919	L'apache^{#}	
November 2, 1919	John Petticoats	
November 9, 1919	What Every Woman Learns^{#}	
November 9, 1919	Crooked Straight^{#}	
November 16, 1919	Erstwhile Susan	
November 16, 1919	23 1/2 Hours' Leave^{#}	
November 19, 1919	Luck in Pawn	
November 22, 1919	Soldiers of Fortune^{#}	
November 23, 1919	Anne of Green Gables^{#}	
November 23, 1919	The Miracle of Love^{#}	
November 23, 1919	The Invisible Bond^{#}	
November 23, 1919	Male and Female	
November 23, 1919	It Pays to Advertise^{#}	
November 30, 1919	Scarlet Days	
November 30, 1919	Hawthorne of the U.S.A.	
November 30, 1919	Counterfeit^{#}	
December 7, 1919	Victory	
December 7, 1919	More Deadly Than the Male^{#}	
December 7, 1919	An Adventure in Hearts^{#}	
December 14, 1919	The Cinema Murder^{#}	
December 14, 1919	Behind the Door	
December 21, 1919	His Wife's Friend^{#}	
December 21, 1919	A Girl Named Mary^{#}	
December 28, 1919	Wanted: A Husband^{#}	
December 28, 1919	Red Hot Dollars	
December 30, 1919	Everywoman^{#}	
December 1919	Too Much Johnson^{#}	
December 1919	Dangerous Hours	

== See also ==
- Paramount Pictures
- Category:Lists of films by studio
