= The Chechako =

- Directed by: Hobart Bosworth
- Screenplay by: Hettie Gray Baker
- Story by: Jack London
- Starring: Jack Conway; Myrtle Stedman; Joe Ray; Gordon Sackville
- Cinematography: Gus Peterson
- Production company: Hobart Bosworth Productions
- Distributed by: Paramount Pictures
- Release date: 1914
- Country: United States
- Language: English

The Chechako is a 1914 American silent drama film directed by Hobart Bosworth, starring Jack Conway, Myrtle Stedman, Joe Ray and Gordon Sackville. It is based on the 1912 novel Smoke Bellew by Jack London.

The film was scheduled for released in November 1914, but Paramount Pictures pulled the film and released Bosworth's The Country Mouse instead. It is unknown if the film was ever released.

== Cast ==
- Jack Conway as Smoke Bellew
- Myrtle Stedman as Joy Gastell
- Joe Ray as Shorty
- Gordon Sackville as Big Olof

== Preservation ==
With no prints of The Chechako located in any film archives, it is considered a lost film.
