= If I Marry Again =

1925 film

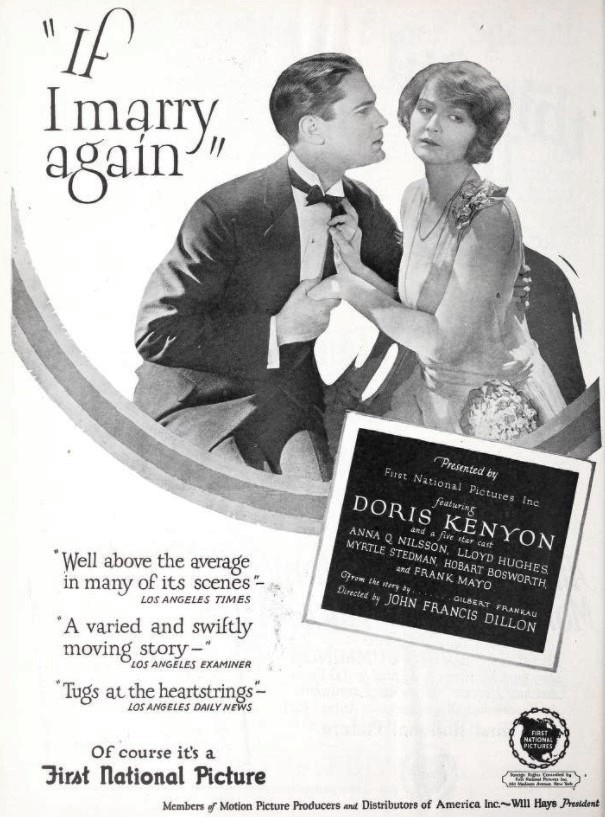
- Advertisement
- Directed by: John Francis Dillon
- Screenplay by: Kenneth B. Clarke
- Based on: If Ever I Marry Again by Gilbert Frankau
- Starring: Doris Kenyon; Lloyd Hughes; Frank Mayo; Hobart Bosworth; Anna Q. Nilsson; Myrtle Stedman
- Cinematography: James Van Trees
- Edited by: LeRoy Stone
- Production company: First National Pictures
- Distributed by: First National Pictures
- Release date: February 15, 1925
- Running time: 80 minutes
- Country: United States
- Language: Silent (English intertitles)

If I Marry Again is a 1925 American silent drama film directed by John Francis Dillon and written by Kenneth B. Clarke. The film stars Doris Kenyon, Lloyd Hughes, Frank Mayo, Hobart Bosworth, Anna Q. Nilsson, and Myrtle Stedman, and was released on February 15, 1925, by First National Pictures. It was based on a story by the British writer Gilbert Frankau.

== Plot ==
As described in a review in a film magazine, stern, wealthy, and jealous of his family name, John Jordan instructs his confidential manager Jeffrey Wingate to proceed at once to plantations in the tropics. Jordan's idea is to get his son Charles away from an affair with Jocelyn Margot, a young woman from Madame Margot's, a place with a shady reputation.

Charlie marries Jocelyn, however, and Jordan is furious. During a four-year stay, Jocelyn proves to be true blue, and a son is born. Unrelenting, Jordan sends Wingate to bring his son back, but Charles dies of fever. Jocelyn, determined to obtain advantages for her son, returns, but Jordan will have nothing to do with her despite the fact that she has won Wingate over. Accused of being a blackmailer, Jocelyn determines to reopen her mother's place under the name Jordan, but breaks down and cannot go through with it.

Wingate had neglected his wife Alicia for business to the extent that she fainted and died in a fall, after a stormy interview declares that if he marries again it will be with a woman whom he makes part of his life, sharing his joys and sorrows. He finally convinces Jordan that Jocelyn is true and takes her and the boy into his home.

== Cast ==
- Doris Kenyon as Jocelyn Margot
- Lloyd Hughes as Charlie Jordan
- Frank Mayo as Jeffrey Wingate
- Hobart Bosworth as John Jordan
- Anna Q. Nilsson as Alicia Wingate
- Myrtle Stedman as Madame Margot
- Dorothy Brock as Sonny

== Preservation ==
With no prints of If I Marry Again located in any film archives, it is a lost film.
