= Rhea Haines =

American actress

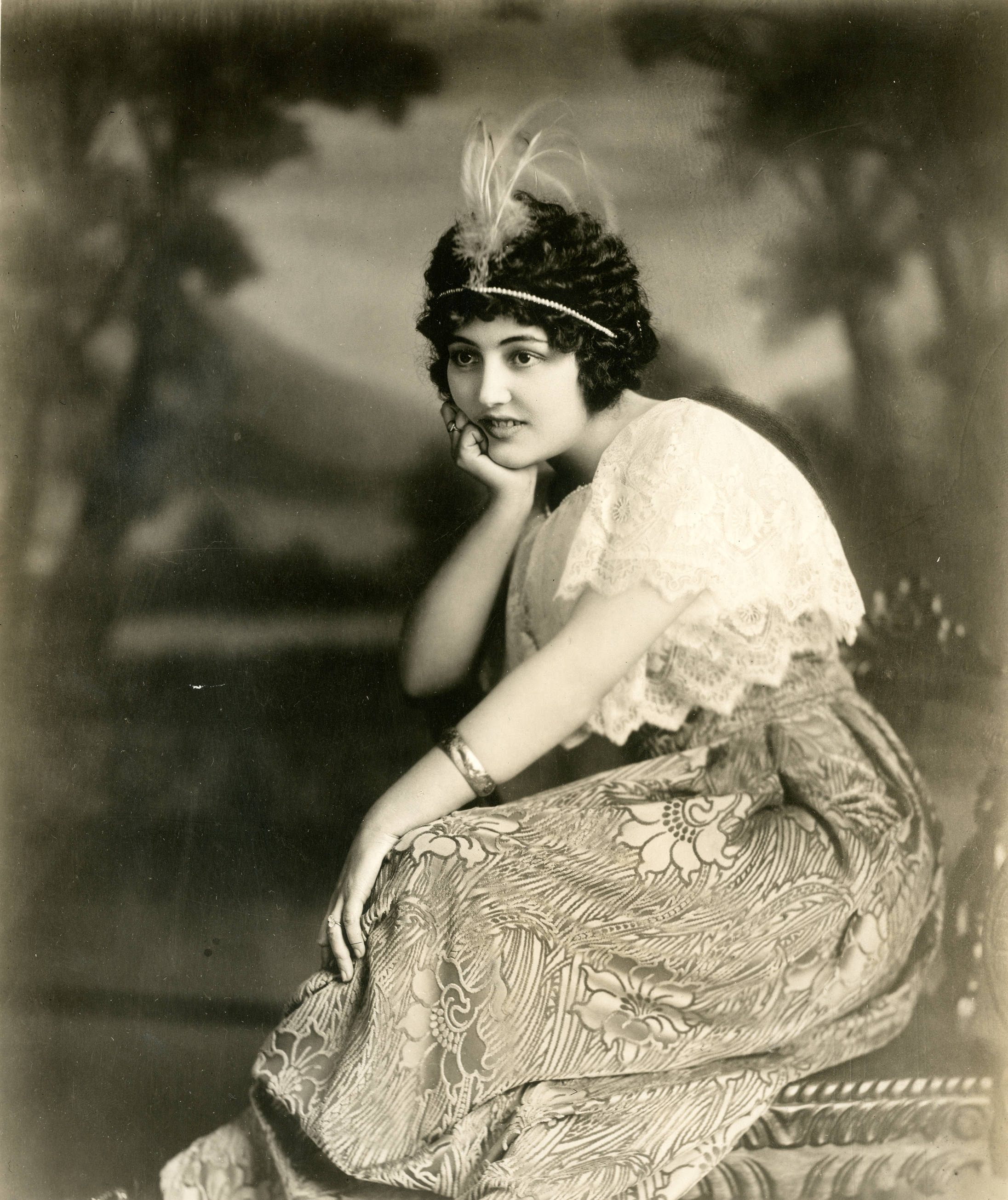
- Haines in 1914
- Born: October 2, 1894; Delaware County, Indiana U.S.
- Died: March 12, 1964 (aged 69); Hollywood, California
- Occupation: Actress
- Years active: 1914–1921
- Spouse: Thomas Case

Rhea Haines (October 2, 1894 – March 12, 1964) was an American silent film actress.

== Biography ==
Haines was a leading lady for the film company of actor Hobart Bosworth. She played in films with Lillian Gish, Dorothy Gish, and Mack Sennett. In 1920 she appeared in Mary Ellen Comes to Town and Always Audacious for Paramount Pictures. The same year she performed in The Master Stroke for Vitagraph and Smiling All The Way for D.N. Schwab. In 1921 Haines made Uncharted Seas for Metro Pictures.

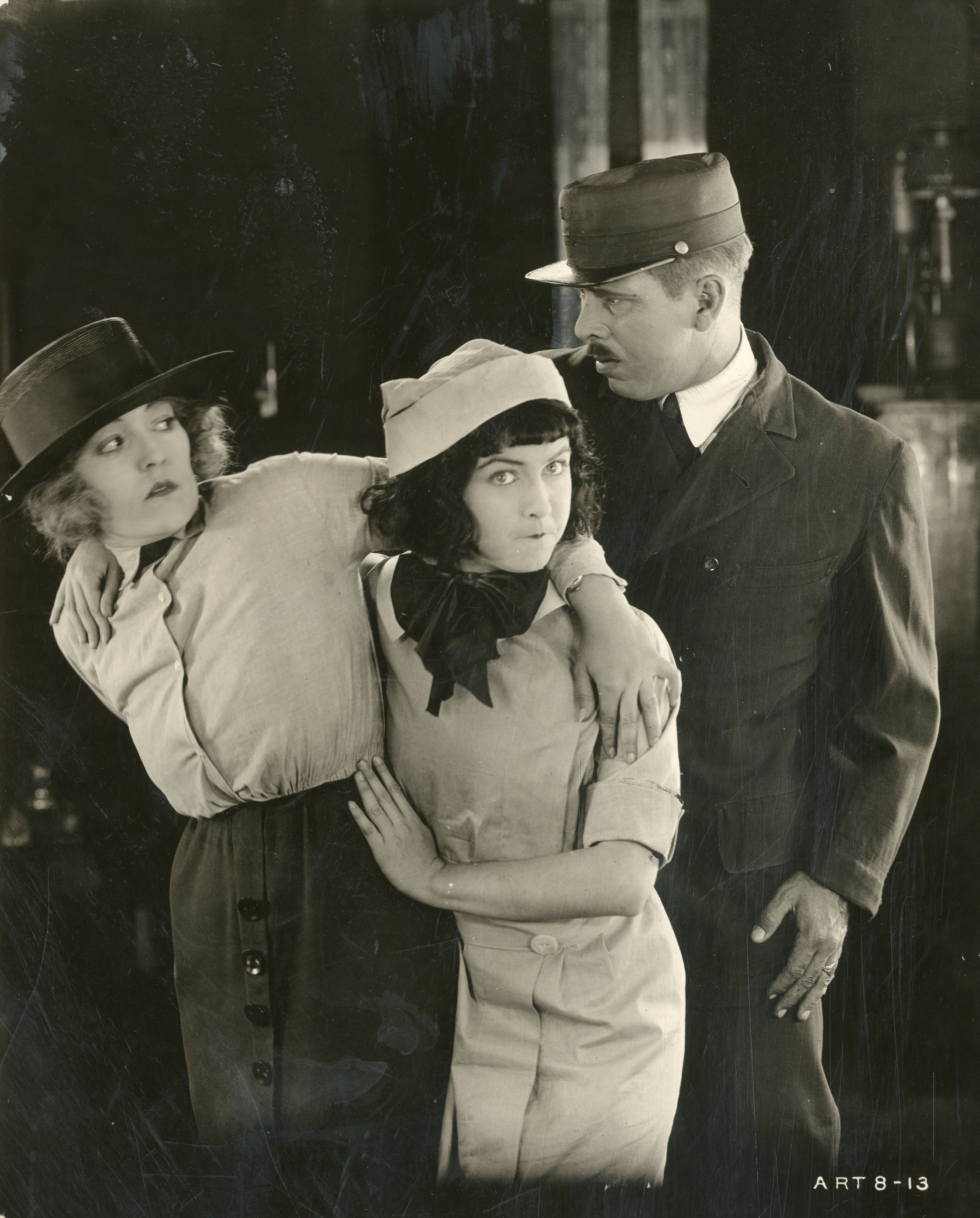
Haines with Dorothy Gish and Raymond Cannon in Turning the Tables (1919)

In Mary Ellen Comes To Town, she appeared with Dorothy Gish, Ralph Graves, and Charles Gerrard. The film was directed by Elmer Clifton.

She was associated as an actress with both D. W. Griffith and the Fine Arts Theater. Haines stopped making motion pictures in the early 1920s. She was married to attorney Thomas Case.

She died in Los Angeles, California, in 1964, aged 69, from undisclosed causes.

== Partial filmography ==
- John Barleycorn (1914)
- An Odyssey of the North (1914)
- Burning Daylight: The Adventures of 'Burning Daylight' in Alaska (1914)
- The Pursuit of the Phantom (1914)
- The Country Mouse (1914)
- Buckshot John (1915)
- Little Sunset (1915)
- The Beachcomber (1915)
- The Chalice of Sorrow (1916)
- Nina, the Flower Girl (1917)
- Hands Up! (1917)
- The Man from Painted Post (1917)
- Turning the Tables (1919)
- Scarlet Days (1919)
- A Master Stroke (1920)
- Runnin' Straight (1920)
- Mary Ellen Comes to Town (1920)
- Always Audacious (1920)
- Uncharted Seas (1921)
