= Across the Plains =

Across the Plains may refer to:

- Across the Plains (1939 film), an American Western film by Spencer Gordon Bennet
- Across the Plains (1928 film), a silent Western film by Robert J. Horner
- Across the Plains (1911 film), an American Western by Broncho Billy Anderson and Thomas H. Ince
- Across the Plains (1910 film), an American silent Western film by Francis Boggs
- Across the Plains (book), the middle section of Robert Louis Stevenson's three-part travel memoir

== See also ==
- The Plains Across, a historical monograph by John D. Unruh, Jr.
