= The Beachcomber (1915 film) =

1915 film by Phil Rosen

- Directed by: Phil Rosen
- Story by: Hobart Bosworth
- Produced by: Hobart Bosworth
- Starring: Hobart Bosworth; Helen Wolcott; Mr. Rahawanaku; Cora Drew; John Weiss; W.F. Harrison
- Cinematography: Gus Peterson
- Production company: Hobart Bosworth Productions
- Distributed by: Paramount Pictures
- Release date: 1915
- Country: United States
- Language: English

The Beachcomber is a 1915 American drama silent film directed by Phil Rosen and written by Hobart Bosworth. The film stars Hobart Bosworth, Helen Wolcott, Mr. Rahawanaku, Cora Drew, John Weiss and W.F. Harrison. The film was released in 1915, by Paramount Pictures.

== Cast ==
- Hobart Bosworth as The Sailor
- Helen Wolcott as Taleaa
- Mr. Rahawanaku as Kane Pili
- Cora Drew as Mother
- John Weiss as Maukaa
- W.F. Harrison as Nalu
- J. Harvey as Ka'alehai
- Dan Waid as Waonokiki
- Rhea Haines as Palikii
- Marshall Stedman as Mate of the Edith / Missionary
