= Porter Strong =

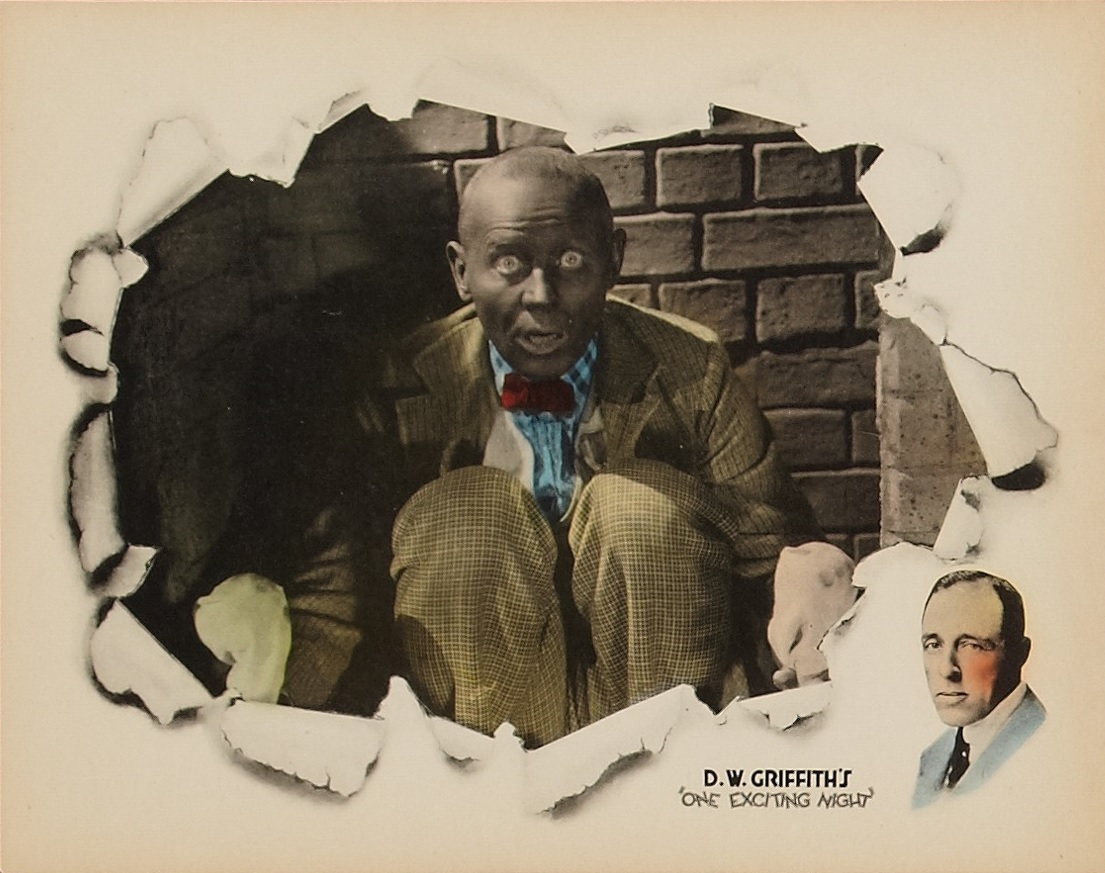
- Porter Strong in One Exciting Night(1922)
- Born: St. Joseph, Missouri
- Died: June 11, 1923; New York City, US
- Occupation: actor
- Years active: 1914-1923

Strong, left, in non-makeup with Dorothy Gish and Raymond Cannon in Turning the Tables.

Porter Strong (1879- June 11, 1923) was an American silent film character actor. Often he appeared in ethnic humour roles as a country bumpkin or as an individual in blackface. He's best remembered for his comic relief appearances in films directed by D. W. Griffith. Since many of Griffith's films survive so has Strong's performances.

He died in New York City.

== Filmography ==
- Ham the Iceman (1914) *short
- The Bold Banditti and the Rah, Rah Boys (1914)*short
- Safety First (1915)*short
- The Kinship of Courage (1915)*short
- The Little Life Guard (1915)*short
- Martha's Vindication (1916)
- Maybe Moonshine (1916)*short
- Ham Agrees with Sherman (1916)*short
- For Sweet Charity (1916)*short
- Ham and the Hermit's Daughter (1916)*short
- Brainstorm (1917)*short
- A Bath House Tangle (1917)*short
- Even as Him and Her (1917)*short
- Her Whirlwind Wedding (1918)*short
- A Romance of Happy Valley (1919)
- I'll Get Him Yet (1919)
- Nobody Home (1919)
- Turning the Tables (1919)
- The Idol Dancer (1920)
- Way Down East (1920)
- Flying Pat (1920)
- The Ghost in the Garret (1921)
- Dream Street (1921)
- One Exciting Night (1922)
- The White Rose (1923)

== See also ==
- El Brendel
