= Davy Crockett (1910 film) =

1910 film

- Directed by: Francis Boggs
- Produced by: William Selig
- Starring: Hobart Bosworth
- Distributed by: Selig Polyscope Co.
- Release date: 1910
- Country: United States
- Languages: Silent; English intertitles

Davy Crockett is a 1910 American silent Western film starring Hobart Bosworth as Davy Crockett, with Betty Harte and Tom Santschi. The film was directed by Francis Boggs and distributed by Selig Polyscope Co. It was commercially released in the United States. With a storyline similar to the 1909 Davy Crockett – In Hearts United, this fictional account of Crockett's life has him rescuing his lady love from marrying his rival. The movie ends with Crockett and his girlfriend riding off together.

== See also ==
- List of American films of 1910
