= The Pursuit of the Phantom =

1914 film

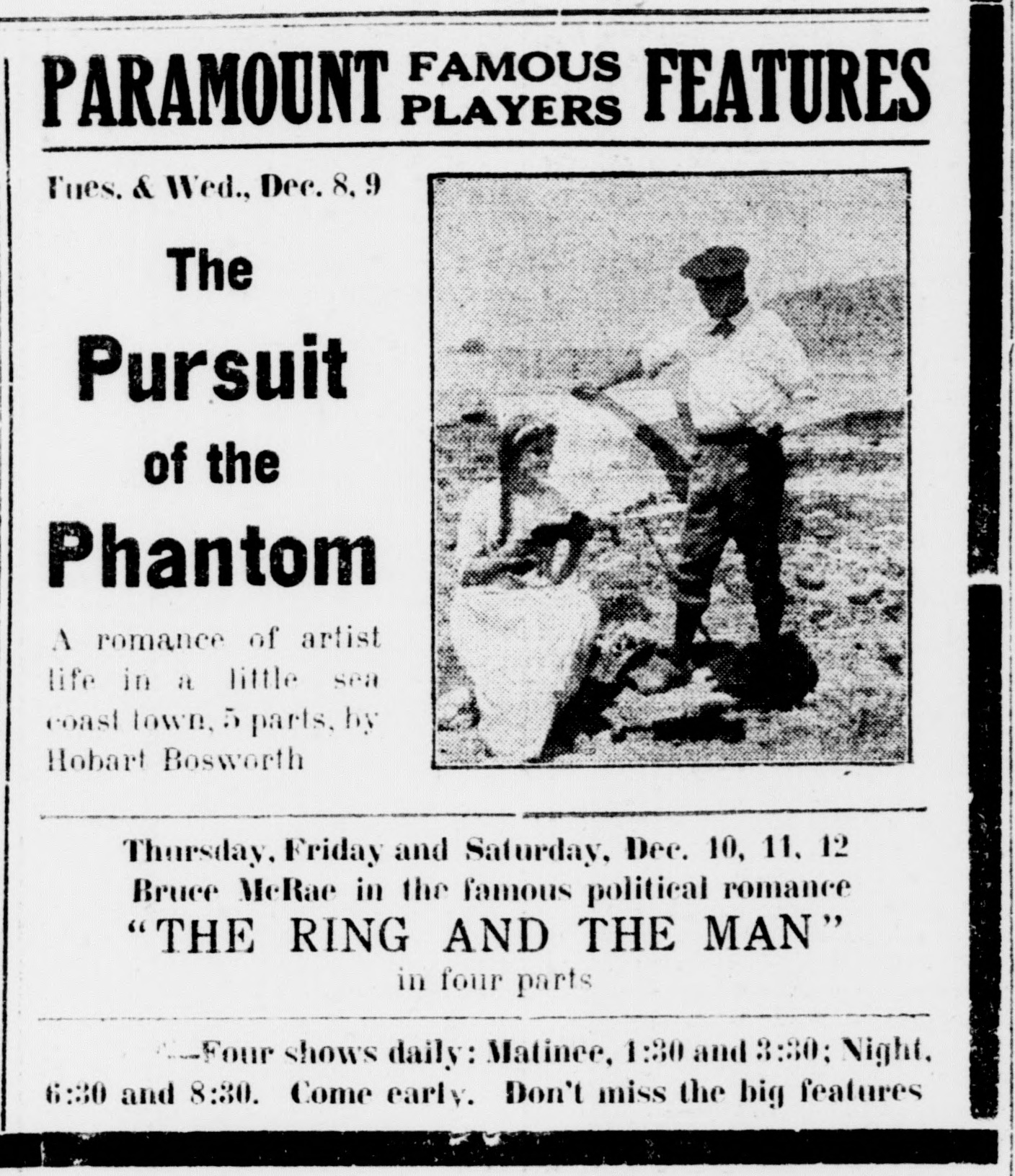
- Contemporary advertisement
- Directed by: Hobart Bosworth
- Screenplay by: Hobart Bosworth
- Starring: Hobart Bosworth; Rhea Haines; Helen Wolcott; Courtenay Foote; Myrtle Stedman
- Cinematography: George W. Hill
- Production company: Hobart Bosworth Productions
- Distributed by: Paramount Pictures
- Release date: October 1, 1914
- Running time: 50 minutes
- Country: United States
- Language: English

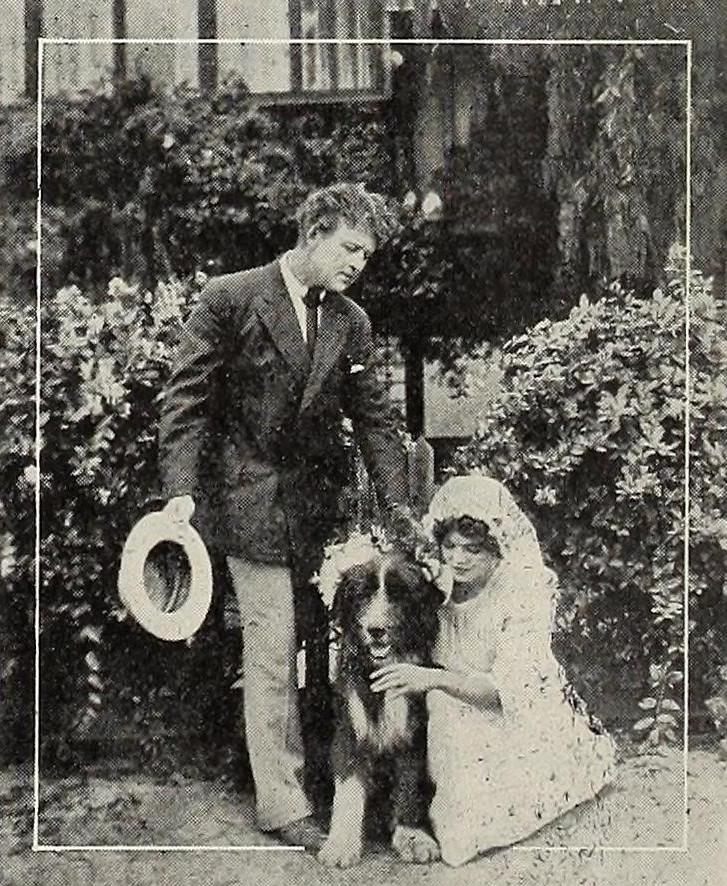
Scene from the film

The Pursuit of the Phantom is a 1914 American drama film written and directed by Hobart Bosworth. The film stars Hobart Bosworth, Rhea Haines, Helen Wolcott, Courtenay Foote and Myrtle Stedman. The film was released on September 1, 1914, by Paramount Pictures.

== Plot ==
The story tells about a budding romance between an artist and a city girl that is severed when she abandons him for a wealthy millionaire’s yacht in pursuit of material happiness. Left heartbroken, the artist reflects on his loss while the film concludes with a symbolic, allegorical sequence comparing the two men's fates. This finale uses trick photography to reveal the millionaire's hollow success as a skeletal female figure, while the artist is shown to ultimately find true, lasting contentment.

== Cast ==
- Hobart Bosworth as Richard Alden
- Rhea Haines as Alden's sweetheart
- Helen Wolcott as Helen Alden
- Courtenay Foote as Wyant Van Zandt
- Myrtle Stedman as Helen Alden
- Emmett J. Flynn as Van Zandt's son
- Nigel De Brulier as The Poet
