= Uncharted Seas =

1921 film by Wesley Ruggles

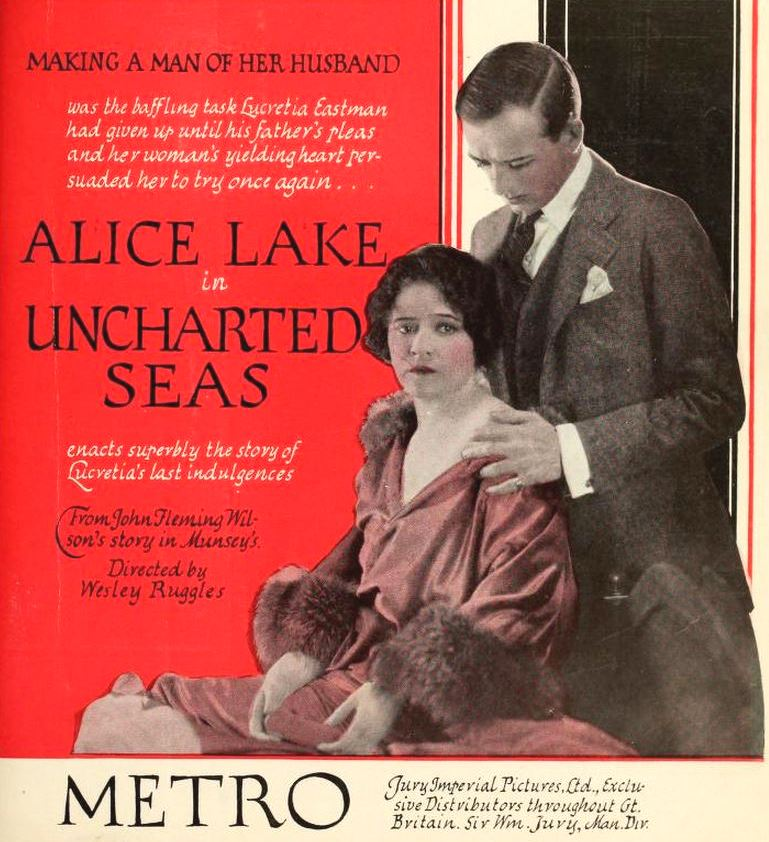
- Advertisement
- Directed by: Wesley Ruggles
- Written by: George Elwood Jenks
- Based on: “The Uncharted Sea” by John Fleming Wilson
- Cinematography: John F. Seitz
- Distributed by: Metro Pictures
- Release date: April 25, 1921
- Running time: 6 reels
- Country: United States
- Language: Silent (English intertitles)

Uncharted Seas is a 1921 American silent romance drama film directed by Wesley Ruggles and starring Alice Lake, Carl Gerard, and Rudolph Valentino.

This is now a lost film.

== Plot ==
As described in a film magazine, after her drunken husband Tom Eastman (Gerard) brings home three cabaret women, Lucretia (Lake) can no longer bear the abuse and turns to arctic explorer Frank Underwood (Valentino), who has long loved her and promised to come whenever she needs his help. Urging her husband to become a man and do something worthwhile, Lucretia goes with him to the North seas in search of a treasure ship. Tom becomes panic stricken and turns back, while she goes on with Frank, who is on the same mission in his own ship. The two fight against temptation and win, and when their ship is destroyed on the ice they set off to civilization with a dog sled. They are saved by a government cruiser.

== Cast ==
- Alice Lake as Lucretia Eastman
- Carl Gerard as Tom Eastman
- Rudolph Valentino as Frank Underwood
- Robert Alden as Fred Turner
- Charles Hill Mailes as Old Jim Eastman (credited as Charles Mailes)
- Rhea Haines as Ruby Lawton
