= Little Sunset =

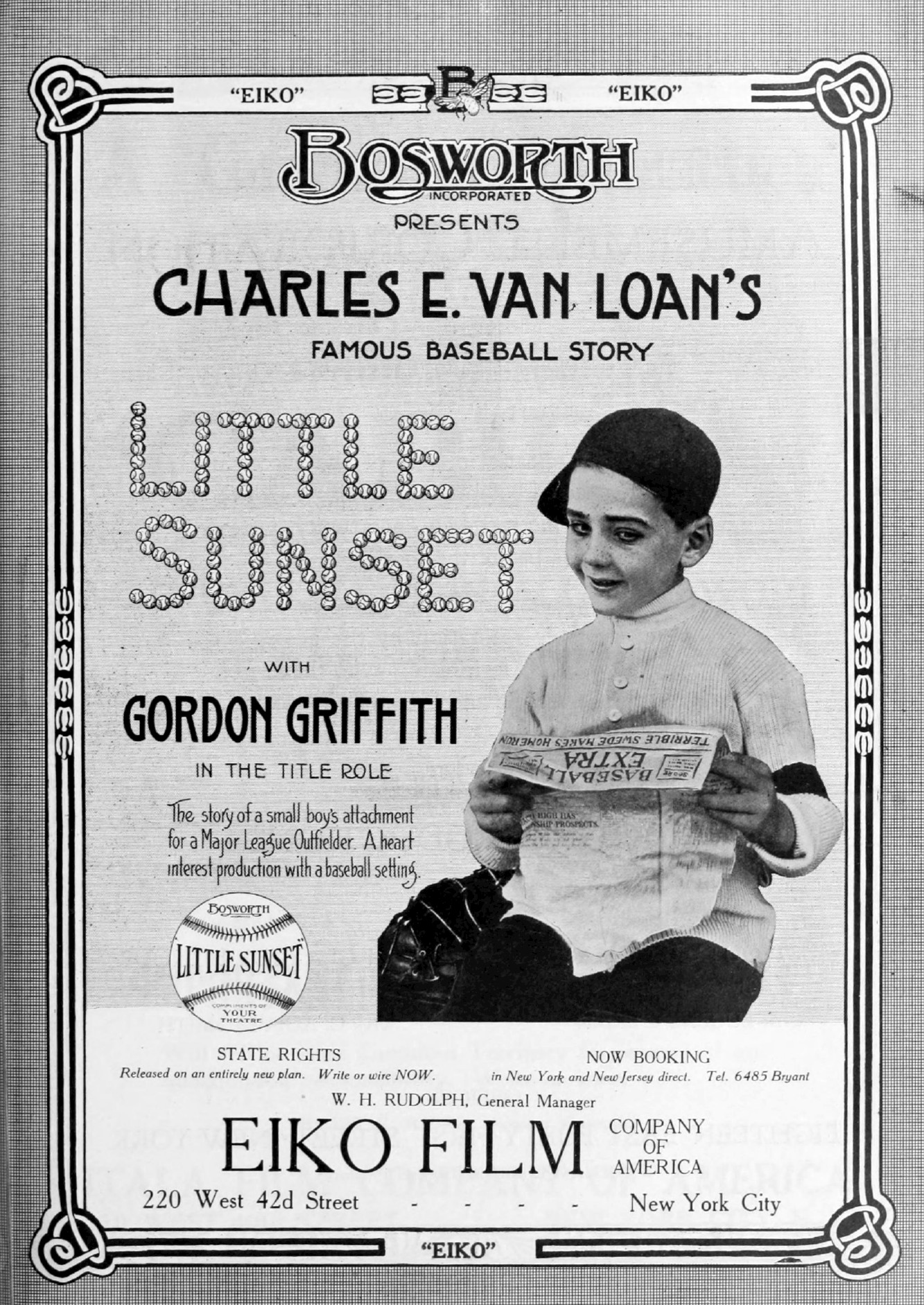
- Ad for film
- Directed by: Hobart Bosworth
- Story by: Charles E. van Loan
- Produced by: Hobart Bosworth
- Starring: Hobart Bosworth; Gordon Griffith; Rhea Haines; Joe Ray; Marshall Stedman
- Production companies: Hobart Bosworth Productions; Oliver Morosco Photoplay Company
- Distributed by: Paramount Pictures
- Release date: May 6, 1915
- Country: United States
- Language: English

Little Sunset is a 1915 American comedy silent film directed by Hobart Bosworth and written by Charles Emmett Van Loan. The film stars Hobart Bosworth, Gordon Griffith, Rhea Haines, Joe Ray and Marshall Stedman. The film was released on May 6, 1915, by Paramount Pictures.

The film is based on a 1912 story by Charles Emmett van Loan, then the leading writer of baseball fiction in America. It is one of the first baseball films. The "Apaches" featured in the film were actually the Vernon Tigers team players, then among the best professional baseball players in California in the Pacific Coast League.

The film is also one of the first feature films to focus on the story of a child. Children have been a familiar presence since the origins of cinema in many short films, here Gordon Griffith - at the age of 8 with already considerable experience in movies - becomes the first child actor to star in a feature film in the United States. After him, the same opportunity would be offered in the 1910s only to Marie Osborne, Zoe Rae and Tibor Lubinszky. It would then become common practice in the 1920s, especially after the enormous success of The Kid (1921) with Charlie Chaplin and Jackie Coogan.

== Plot ==
After his mother's death, "Little Sunset" (Gordon Griffith) becomes the mascot of the Apaches baseball team, and "Gus, the Terrible Swede" (Hobart Bosworth) becomes very fond of the child. When Little Sunset gets sick, Gus falls into a state of depression, and after being scolded by the coach for making a bad play in an important game, he uses the incident as an excuse to leave the team. This, however, leaves Little Sunset even more disillusioned and angry. Gus returns to lead the Apaches to victory in the championship, thus regaining the faith and friendship of Little Sunset.

== Cast ==
- Hobart Bosworth as Gus Bergstrom the 'Terrible Swede'
- Gordon Griffith as 'Little Sunset' Jones
- Rhea Haines as Mrs. Jones
- Joe Ray as Jones
- Marshall Stedman as 'Apache' manager
