= The Country Mouse (1914 film) =

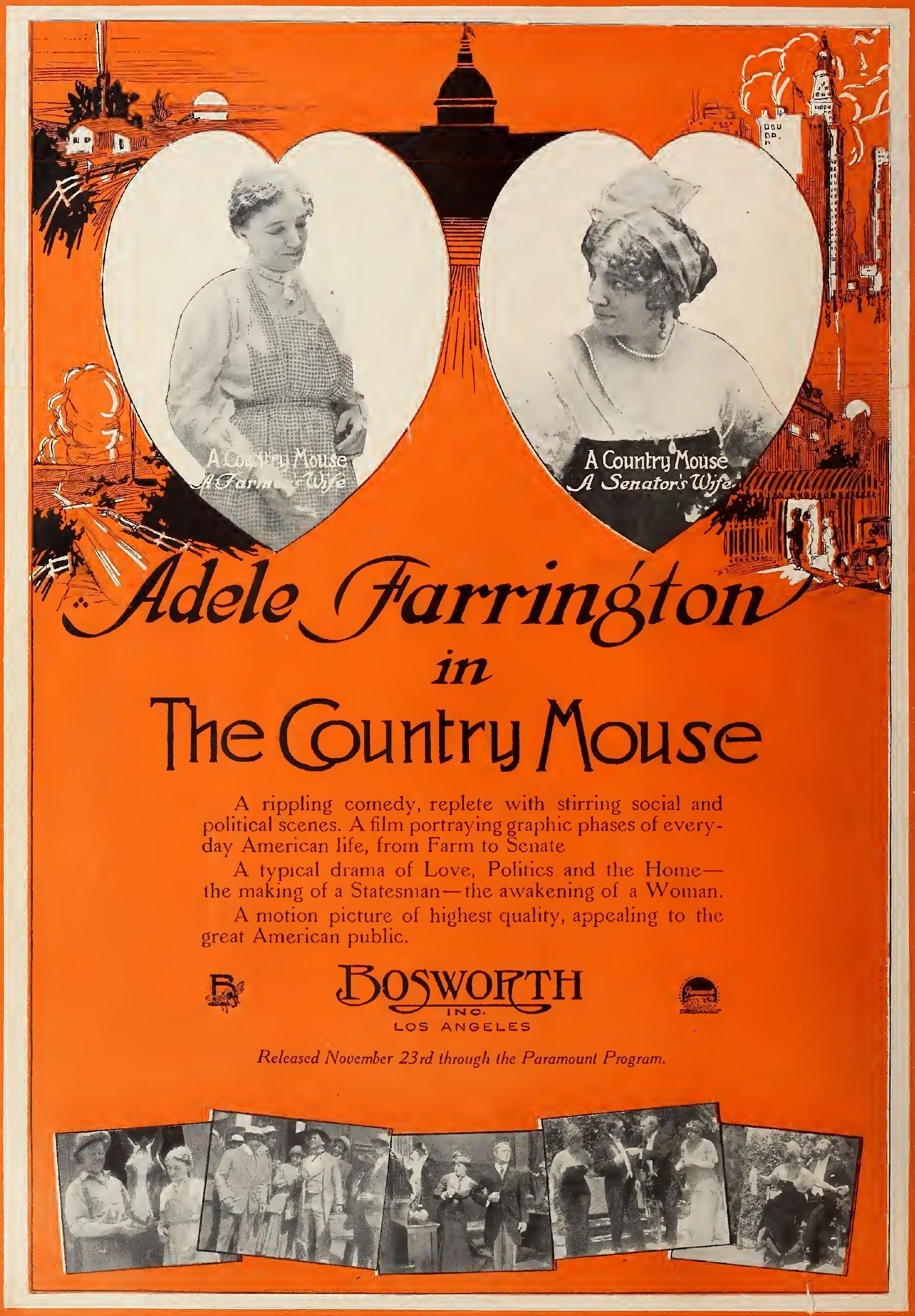
- Directed by: Hobart Bosworth
- Screenplay by: Hobart Bosworth
- Produced by: Hobart Bosworth
- Starring: Hobart Bosworth; Adele Farrington; Myrtle Stedman; Marshall Stedman; Rhea Haines
- Production company: Hobart Bosworth Productions
- Distributed by: Paramount Pictures
- Release date: November 23, 1914
- Country: United States
- Language: English

The Country Mouse is a 1914 American comedy silent film written and directed by Hobart Bosworth. The film stars Hobart Bosworth, Adele Farrington, Myrtle Stedman, Marshall Stedman and Rhea Haines. The film was released on November 23, 1914, by Paramount Pictures.

== Cast ==
- Hobart Bosworth as Billy Bladerson
- Adele Farrington as Addie Balderson
- Myrtle Stedman as Myrtle Marshall
- Marshall Stedman as George Marshall
- Rhea Haines as Madame Pauline
