= Always Audacious =

1920 film by James Cruze

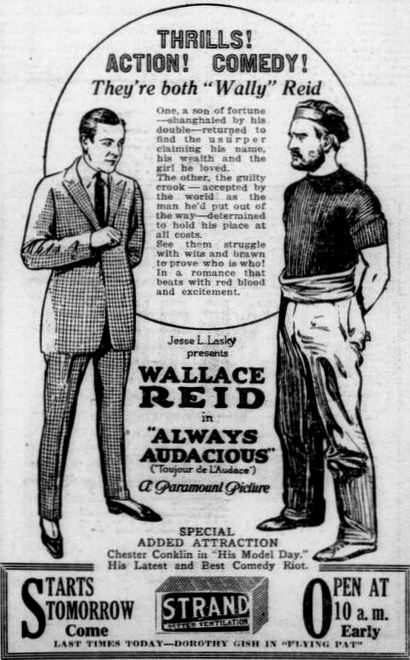
- Newspaper ad
- Directed by: James Cruze
- Screenplay by: Thomas J. Geraghty
- Based on: "Toujours de l'Audace" by Ben Ames Williams
- Produced by: Jesse L. Lasky
- Starring: Wallace Reid; Margaret Loomis; Clarence Geldart; J.M. Dumont; Rhea Haines; Carmen Phillips; Guy Oliver
- Cinematography: Charles Edgar Schoenbaum
- Music by: Hugo Riesenfeld
- Production company: Famous Players–Lasky Corporation
- Distributed by: Paramount Pictures
- Release date: November 14, 1920
- Running time: 50 minutes
- Country: United States
- Language: Silent (English intertitles)

Always Audacious is a 1920 American silent romance film directed by James Cruze and written by Thomas J. Geraghty. The film stars Wallace Reid in a dual role, Margaret Loomis, Clarence Geldart, J.M. Dumont, Rhea Haines, Carmen Phillips, and Guy Oliver. It is based on the short story "Toujours de l'Audace" by Ben Ames Williams. The film was released on November 14, 1920, by Paramount Pictures.

== Cast ==
- Wallace Reid as Perry Dayton / 'Slim' Attucks
- Margaret Loomis as Camilla Joyt
- Clarence Geldart as Theron Ammidown
- Jean M. Dumont as Jerry the Gent
- Rhea Haines as Denver Kate
- Carmen Phillips as Molly the Eel
- Guy Oliver as Martin Green
- Fanny Midgley as Mrs. Rumson

unbilled

- Monte Blue - ?___unconfirmed

== Preservation ==
In February of 2021, Always Audacious was cited by the National Film Preservation Board on their Lost U.S. Silent Feature Films list and is therefore presumed lost.

== See also ==
- Wallace Reid filmography
