= Mary Ellen Comes to Town =

1920 film by Elmer Clifton

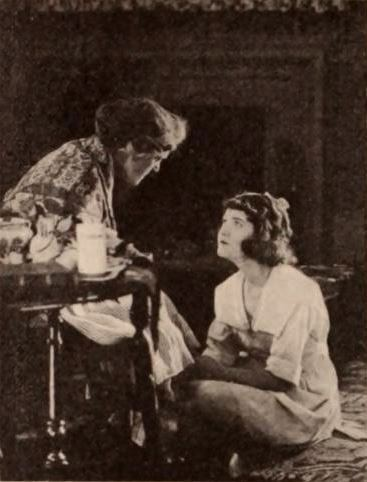
- Still with Kate Bruce and Dorothy Gish
- Directed by: Elmer Clifton
- Screenplay by: Wells Hastings (scenario); Helen G. Smith (story)
- Produced by: Thomas H. Ince
- Starring: Dorothy Gish; Kate Bruce; Ralph Graves; Adolph Lestina; Charles K. Gerrard; Raymond Cannon
- Cinematography: George W. Hill
- Production companies: New Art Film Company; Artcraft Pictures Corporation; Famous Players–Lasky Corporation
- Distributed by: Paramount Pictures
- Release date: March 21, 1920
- Running time: 50 minutes
- Country: United States
- Language: Silent (English intertitles)

Mary Ellen Comes to Town is a 1920 American silent comedy film directed by Elmer Clifton and written by Wells Hastings and Helen G. Smith. Starring Dorothy Gish, Kate Bruce, Ralph Graves, Adolph Lestina, Charles K. Gerrard, and Raymond Cannon, the film was released on March 21, 1920, by Paramount Pictures. It is not known whether the film currently survives.

== Plot ==
As described in a film magazine, Mary Ellen lives in a very small and unprogressive village, her entertainment being to watch the New York City train that passes through each day. A lucky chance gives her a card of introduction to a New York theatrical producer, and she goes to the city, innocently engaging as an entertainer at the Coster Cabaret, which is the headquarters of Willie the Weasel and his band. The Weasel seeks to obtain the fortune recently inherited by Bob Fairacres, also of Mary Ellen's village, though she does not know it. The Weasel forces Mary Ellen to aid him by throwing suspicion of robbery on her. She carries through the plan to the critical moment when she tells Bob the truth, and they are saved when the police raid the cabaret. Bob and Mary Ellen return to their village and to happiness.

== Cast ==
- Dorothy Gish as Mary Ellen
- Kate Bruce as Mary Ellen's mother
- Ralph Graves as Bob Fairacres
- Adolph Lestina as Col. Fairacres
- Charles K. Gerrard as William Gurson aka 'Will the Weasel'
- Raymond Cannon as 'Beauty' Bender
- Bert Appling as Hard Harris
- Rhea Haines as Fossie Fleurette
