= Buckshot John =

1915 film

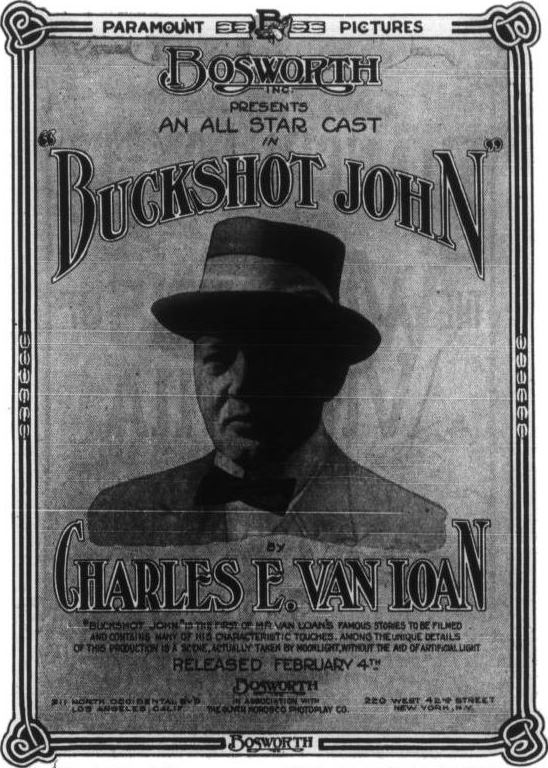
- Advertisement
- Directed by: Hobart Bosworth
- Written by: Hettie Gray Baker; Charles E. van Loan
- Starring: Hobart Bosworth
- Cinematography: George W. Hill
- Distributed by: Paramount Pictures
- Release date: February 4, 1915
- Running time: 50 minutes
- Country: United States
- Languages: Silent; English intertitles

Buckshot John is a 1915 American silent Western film that was directed by and starred Hobart Bosworth.

Location shooting for the film took place in Banning, California.

== Cast ==
- Hobart Bosworth as "Buckshot John" Moran
- Courtenay Foote as Dr. Buchanan Gilmore / The Great Gilmore
- Carl von Schiller as Jimmy Dacey, a Reporter
- Helen Wolcott as Ruth Mason
- Herbert Standing as John Mason
- Marshall Stedman as Warden of state's prison
- Frank Lanning as Bad Jake Kennedy
- Art Acord as Hairtrigger Jordan
- Elmo Lincoln as The sheriff (as Oscar Linkenhelt)
- Rhea Haines as Mrs. Hayden
- Arthur Allardt as Medicine Show Crowd (uncredited)
- J.F. Briscoe as Medicine show crowd (uncredited)
- Mr. Fletcher as Judge (uncredited)
- Hoot Gibson as Medicine Show Crowd (uncredited)
- Wong Ling as Hindo (uncredited)
- Martha Mattox as Medicine Show Crowd (uncredited)
- Robert Murdock as Turnkey (uncredited)
- Ray Myers as Medicine Show Crowd (uncredited)
- Joe Ray as Medicine Show Crowd (uncredited)

== Preservation ==
A print of Buckshot John is held by the Library of Congress.

== See also ==
- List of American films of 1915
- Hoot Gibson filmography
