= Turning the Tables (film) =

1919 film by Elmer Clifton

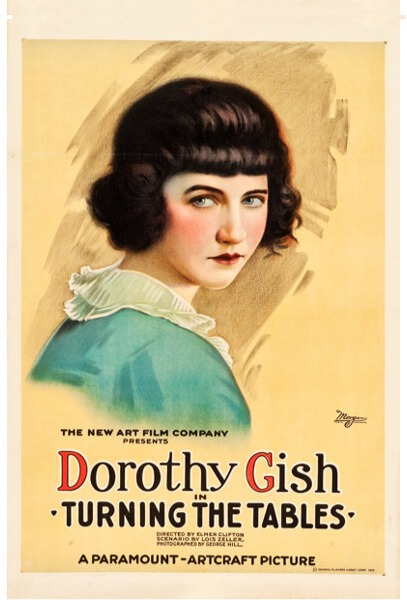
- film poster
- Directed by: Elmer Clifton
- Screenplay by: Wells Hastings; Lois Zellner
- Starring: Dorothy Gish; Raymond Cannon; George Fawcett; Eugenie Besserer; Kate Toncray; Rhea Haines
- Cinematography: George W. Hill
- Production companies: New Art Film Company; Famous Players–Lasky Corporation
- Distributed by: Paramount Pictures
- Release date: November 2, 1919
- Running time: 50 minutes
- Country: United States
- Language: Silent (English intertitles)

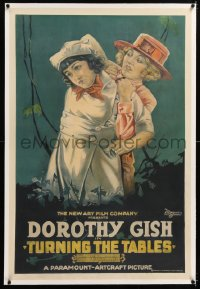
lobby poster

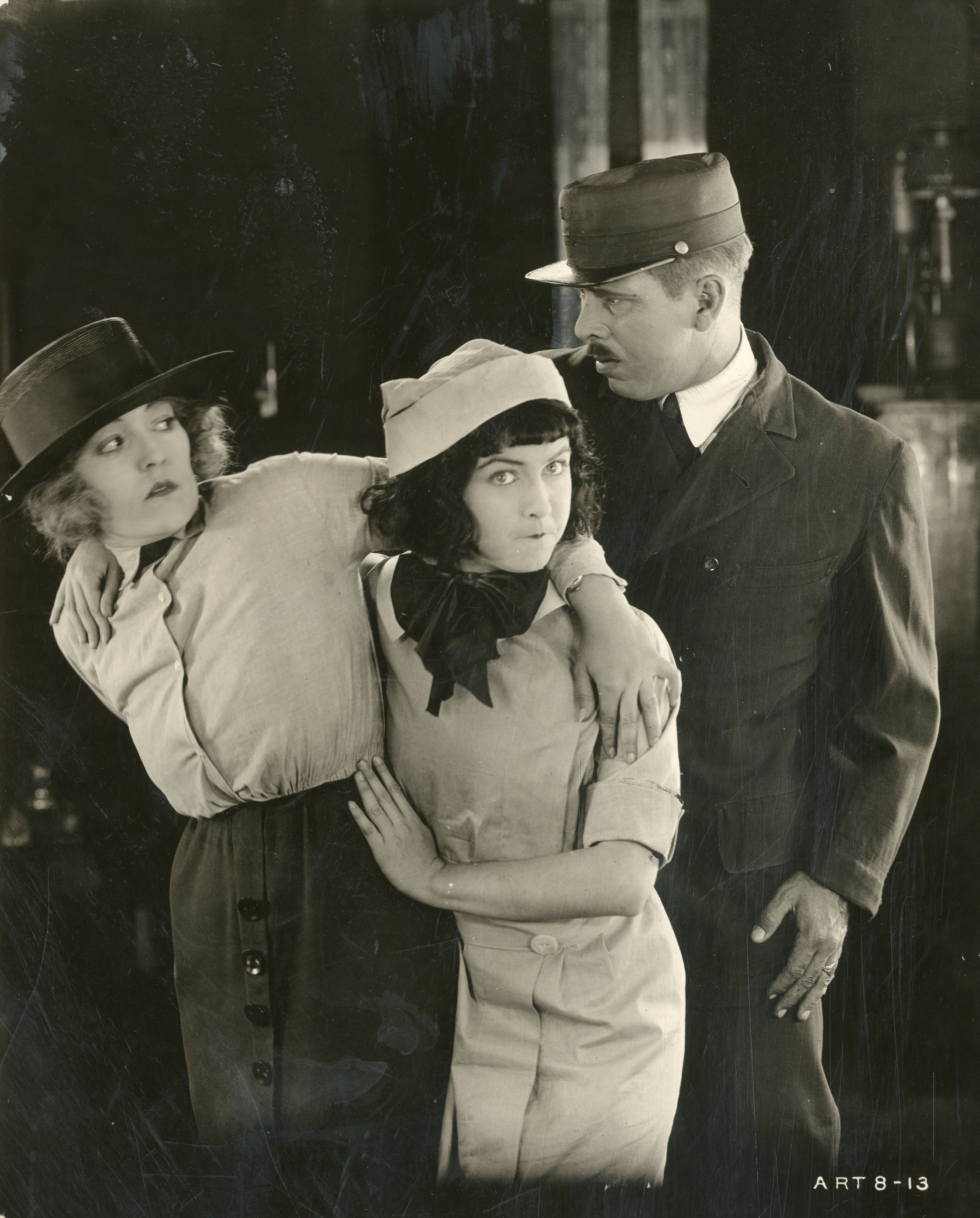
Rhea Haines, Dorothy Gish, Norman McNeil

Lobby card: Porter Strong, Dorothy Gish, Raymond Cannon..

Turning the Tables is a 1919 American silent comedy film directed by Elmer Clifton, written by Wells Hastings and Lois Zellner, and starring Dorothy Gish, Raymond Cannon, George Fawcett, Eugenie Besserer, Kate Toncray, and Rhea Haines. It was released on November 2, 1919, by Paramount Pictures.

== Cast ==
- Dorothy Gish as Doris Pennington
- Raymond Cannon as Monty Feverill
- George Fawcett as Prof. Freno Palmer
- Eugenie Besserer as Mrs. Feverill
- Kate Toncray as Dr. Spinks
- Rhea Haines as Ruth Strong
- Porter Strong as Dr. Eddy
- Norman McNeil as Swipes Conroy

== Preservation ==
The film is considered lost.
