= The Soul of Kura San =

1916 film by Edward LeSaint

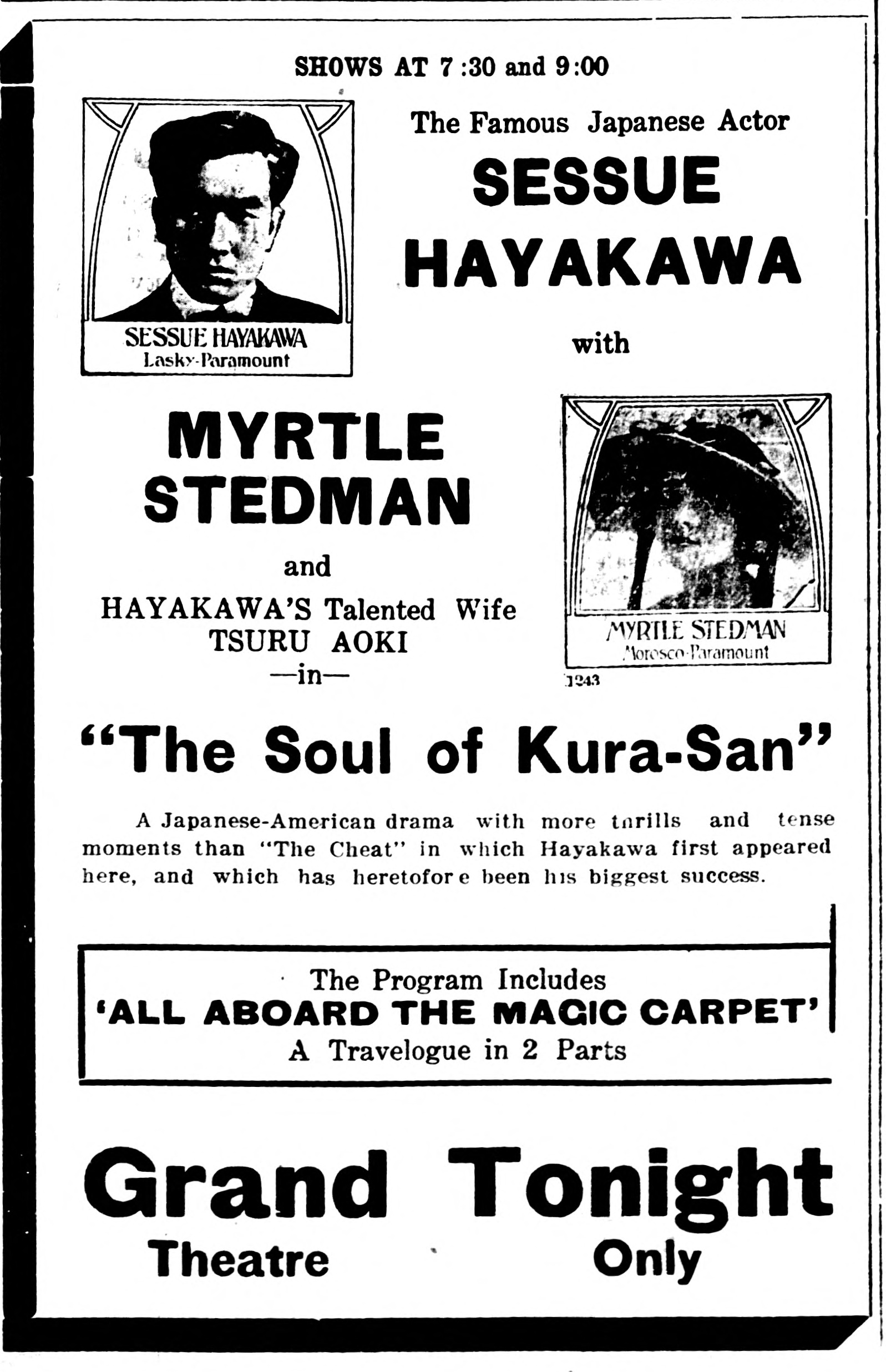
- Newspaper advertisement
- Directed by: Edward LeSaint
- Screenplay by: Charles Sarver
- Story by: Frances Guihan
- Produced by: Jesse L. Lasky
- Starring: Sessue Hayakawa; Myrtle Stedman; Tsuru Aoki; George Webb; Kisaburo Kurihara; George Kuwa
- Cinematography: Allen M. Davey
- Production company: Jesse L. Lasky Feature Play Company
- Distributed by: Paramount Pictures
- Release date: October 30, 1916
- Running time: 50 minutes
- Country: United States
- Languages: Silent; English intertitles

The Soul of Kura San is a 1916 American drama silent film directed by Edward LeSaint and written by Charles Sarver. The film stars Sessue Hayakawa, Myrtle Stedman, Tsuru Aoki, George Webb, Kisaburo Kurihara and George Kuwa. The film was released on October 30, 1916, by Paramount Pictures.

Hayakawa received co-directing credit for his translation work during production, as the cast included many Japanese stage actors who did not speak English.

== Cast ==
- Sessue Hayakawa as Toyo
- Myrtle Stedman as Anne Willoughby
- Tsuru Aoki as Kura-San
- George Webb as Herbert Graham
- Kisaburô Kurihara as Naguchi
- George Kuwa as Oki

== Preservation ==
With no prints of The Soul of Kura-San located in any film archives, it is considered a lost film.
