= The American Beauty =

1916 film by William Desmond Taylor

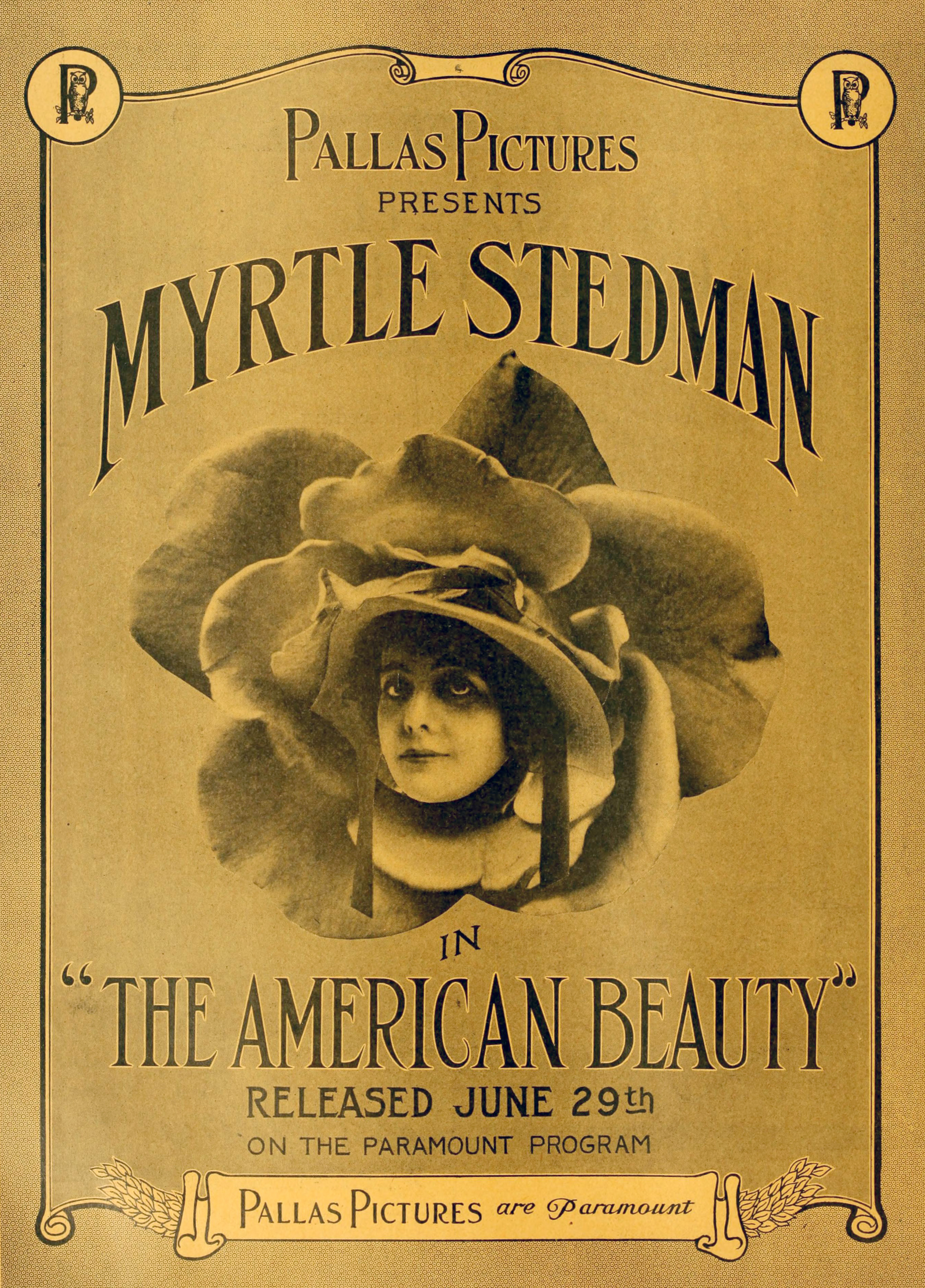
- Theatre poster, 1916
- Directed by: William Desmond Taylor
- Written by: Julia Crawford Ivers
- Produced by: Pallas Pictures
- Starring: Myrtle Stedman
- Cinematography: James Van Trees
- Distributed by: Paramount Pictures
- Release date: June 29, 1916
- Running time: 50 minutes; 5 reels
- Country: United States
- Language: Silent (English intertitles)

The American Beauty is a lost 1916 American silent drama film directed by William Desmond Taylor and starring Myrtle Stedman.

== Cast ==
- Myrtle Stedman - Ruth Cleave, Mrs. Marin Ellsworth
- Elliott Dexter - Paul Keith
- Howard Davies - Herbert Lorrimer
- Jack Livingston - Martin Ellsworth
- Adelaide Woods - Mrs. Cleave
- Edward Ayers - Cleave
