= As Men Love =

1917 film by E. Mason Hopper

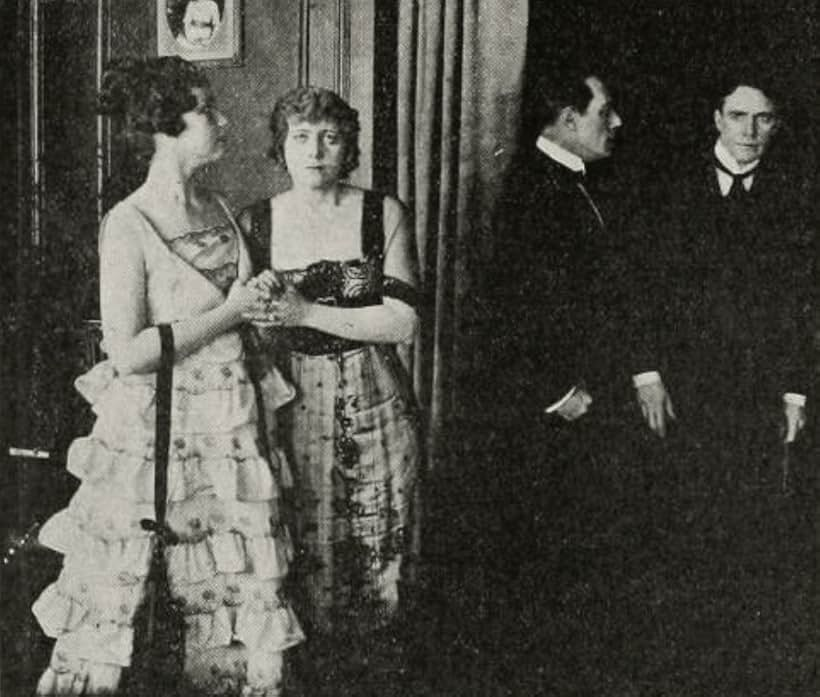
- Film still
- Directed by: E. Mason Hopper
- Screenplay by: Adele Harris; Lois Zellner
- Starring: House Peters, Sr. Myrtle Stedman; Jack W. Johnston; Helen Jerome Eddy
- Cinematography: Homer Scott
- Production company: Pallas Pictures
- Distributed by: Paramount Pictures
- Release date: March 29, 1917
- Running time: 50 minutes
- Country: United States
- Language: English

As Men Love is a lost 1917 American silent drama film directed by E. Mason Hopper, and written by Adele Harris and Lois Zellner. The film stars House Peters, Sr., Myrtle Stedman, Jack W. Johnston, and Helen Jerome Eddy. The film was released on March 29, 1917, by Paramount Pictures.

== Cast ==
- House Peters, Sr. as Paul Russell
- Myrtle Stedman as Diana Gordon
- Jack W. Johnston as Keith Gordon
- Helen Jerome Eddy as Marjorie Gordon
