= Burning Daylight: The Adventures of 'Burning Daylight' in Alaska =

- Directed by: Hobart Bosworth
- Screenplay by: Hettie Grey Baker
- Based on: Burning Daylight by Jack London
- Starring: Hobart Bosworth; Rhea Haines; J. Charles Haydon; Elmer Clifton; Jack Conway
- Cinematography: George W. Hill
- Production company: Hobart Bosworth Productions
- Distributed by: Paramount Pictures
- Release date: September 14, 1914
- Running time: 50 minutes
- Country: United States
- Language: English

Burning Daylight: The Adventures of 'Burning Daylight' in Alaska is a 1914 American adventure film directed by Hobart Bosworth, starring Hobart Bosworth, Rhea Haines, J. Charles Haydon, Elmer Clifton and Jack Conway. It is based on the 1910 novel Burning Daylight by Jack London. The film was released on September 14, 1914, by Paramount Pictures.

== Cast ==
- Hobart Bosworth as Elam Harnish
- Rhea Haines as Nell
- J. Charles Haydon as Elijah
- Elmer Clifton as Charley Bates
- Jack Conway as Joe Hines
