= I'll Get Him Yet =

1919 film by Elmer Clifton

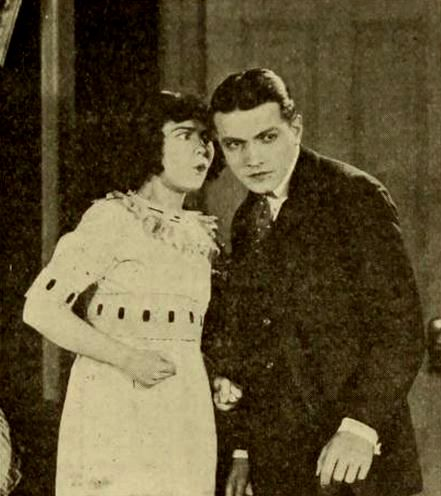
- Film still of Gish and Barthelmess
- Directed by: Elmer Clifton; Leigh R. Smith (assistant)
- Written by: Harry Carr (screen story)
- Produced by: New Art Film Company
- Starring: Dorothy Gish
- Cinematography: John Leezer; Lee Garmes
- Distributed by: Famous Players–Lasky; Paramount Pictures
- Release date: May 18, 1919
- Running time: 50 minutes; 5 reels
- Country: United States
- Language: Silent (English intertitles)

I'll Get Him Yet is a lost 1919 American silent comedy film starring Dorothy Gish and directed by Elmer Clifton. It was produced by D. W. Griffith under his production unit New Art Film. Paramount Pictures distributed the film.

== Plot ==
As described in a film magazine, Susy Faraday Jones, daughter of a wealthy and none too indulgent father, owns a railroad that runs to the seashore and, in order to improve the schedule, she cuts off the town of Rivera as a stop. Two young men in her employ, her general manager and superintendent, each attempt to have sex with her, much to that bored young woman's disgust. She meets Scoop McCready, a reporter, in whom she takes an unusual interest. Soon they are engaged, but when he asks her father Bradford Warrington Jones for her hand and is peremptorily ordered out of the house, he decides he will have nothing further to do with the rich girl. Susy does not have an easy time winning back Scoop, but after she finally agrees to give up every penny of her father's wealth they get married and settle down in Rivera. The arrival at their cottage of her lawyer and two railroad officials causes unexpected complications with amusing attempts by her to hide the men in closets and under sofas until she finally explains their presence to her jealous husband.

== Cast ==
- Dorothy Gish as Susy Faraday Jones
- George Fawcett as Bradford Warrington Jones
- Richard Barthelmess as Scoop McCready
- Ralph Graves as Harold Packard
- Edward Peil, Sr. as Robert Hamilton
- Porter Strong as William Craig
- Wilbur Higby (unknown role)
