= An Odyssey of the North =

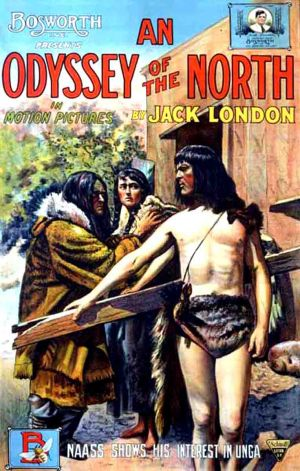
- Theatrical release poster
- Directed by: Hobart Bosworth
- Screenplay by: Hettie Grey Baker; Hobart Bosworth
- Story by: Jack London
- Produced by: Hobart Bosworth
- Starring: Hobart Bosworth; Rhea Haines; Gordon Sackville
- Cinematography: Gus C. Peterson
- Production company: Hobart Bosworth Productions
- Distributed by: Paramount Pictures
- Release date: September 3, 1914
- Country: United States
- Language: English

An Odyssey of the North is a 1914 American adventure film directed by Hobart Bosworth and written by Hettie Grey Baker and Hobart Bosworth. The film stars Hobart Bosworth, Rhea Haines and Gordon Sackville. It is based on the 1899 short story "An Odyssey of the North" by Jack London. The film was released on September 3, 1914, by Paramount Pictures.

Location shooting for the film took place in Truckee, California and Seattle, Washington.

== Cast ==
- Hobart Bosworth as Naass
- Rhea Haines as Unga
- Gordon Sackville as Axel Gunderson
- Joe Ray as Royal Mounted Police officer

== Preservation ==
With no prints of An Odyssey of the North located in any film archives, it is considered a lost film.
