= Across the Plains (1910 film) =

1910 film

- Directed by: Francis Boggs
- Produced by: William Nicholas Selig
- Starring: Hobart Bosworth
- Distributed by: Selig Polyscope Company
- Release date: March 10, 1910
- Running time: 1 reel
- Country: United States
- Languages: Silent; English intertitles

Across the Plains is a 1910 American short silent Western film directed by Francis Boggs and starring Hobart Bosworth.

== Cast ==
- Hobart Bosworth
- Betty Harte
- Tom Santschi
