= Hobart Bosworth =

American film actor (1867–1943)

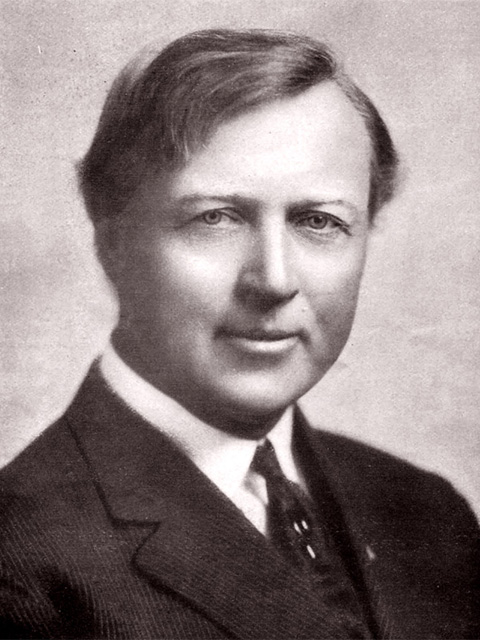
- Bosworth in 1916
- Born: Hobart Van Zandt Bosworth; August 11, 1867; Marietta, Ohio, U.S.
- Died: December 30, 1943 (aged 76); Glendale, California, U.S.
- Occupations: Actor; film director; producer; writer
- Years active: 1908–1942
- Spouses: Adele Farrington (?–1919) (divorced); Cecile Kibre (1920–1943) (his death)
- Children: 1

Hobart Van Zandt Bosworth (August 11, 1867 – December 30, 1943) was an American film actor, director, writer, and producer. Bosworth began his career in theater, eventually transitioning to the emerging film industry. Despite a battle with tuberculosis, he found success in silent films, establishing himself as a lead actor and pioneering the industry in California. Bosworth started his own production company, Hobart Bosworth Productions, in 1913, focusing on Jack London melodramas. After the company closed, Bosworth continued to act in supporting roles, surviving the transition to sound films. He is known as the "Dean of Hollywood" for his role in shaping the California film industry. In 1960, Bosworth was awarded a star on the Hollywood Walk of Fame for his contributions to the film industry.

== Early life ==
Bosworth was born on August 11, 1867, in Marietta, Ohio. His father was a sea captain during the Civil War.

When Bosworth was 12 years old he ran away to sea. In June 1885, while he was on shore leave in San Francisco, an opportunity arose for him to join McKee Rankin's stage company. This proved to be the beginning of his theatrical career.

== Career ==
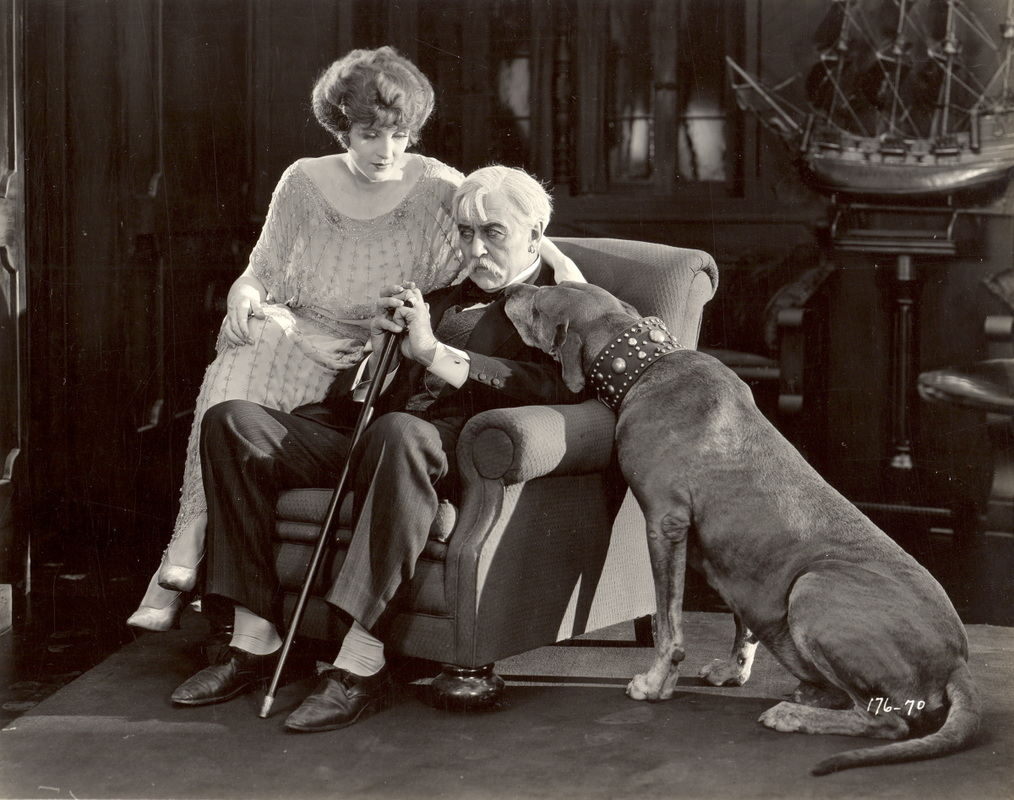
Bosworth, Claire Windsor and Teddy the Dog in Marshall Neilan's The Strangers' Banquet (1922)

As an aspiring landscape painter it was suggested that he work as a stage manager to raise money for his art studies. Acting on a friend's advice Bosworth obtained a job with McKee Rankin as a stage manager at the California Theatre in San Francisco. Here he was eventually also pressed into duty as an actor in a small part with just three lines. Though he botched the lines he was subsequently given other small roles. Bosworth was eighteen years old and on the cusp of a life in the theater.

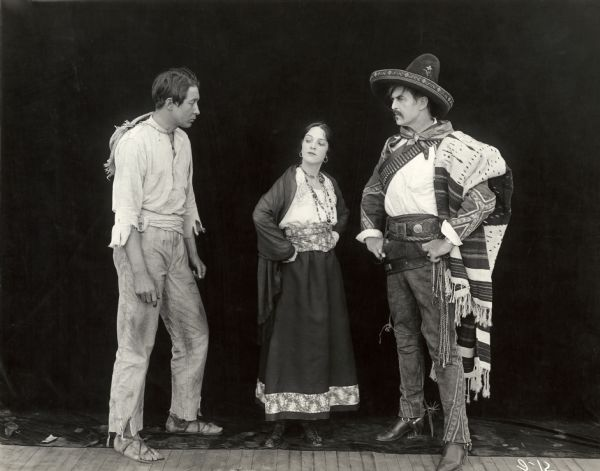
Publicity still of (from left) Monte Blue, Miriam Cooper, and Bosworth in costumes for the silent drama Betrayed (1917)

Hobart signed on with Lewis Morrison to be part of a road company for a season as both an actor and as Morrison's dresser, playing Shakespeare's Cymbeline and Measure for Measure. During his time with the company, Hobart and another writer wrote a version of Faust that Morrison used for twenty years in repertory. By 1887, he was acting at the Alcazar Theatre in San Francisco. He became proficient enough on stage to give Shakespearean canon by the time he was twenty-one years old, though he admitted that he was the worst Macbeth ever.

Bosworth eventually wound up in Park City, Utah, where he worked in a mine, pushing an ore wagon in order to raise money. He escaped the pits to tour with the magician Hermann the Great as the conjurer's assistant for a tour through Mexico.

For the first time in eleven years, the 21-year-old Bosworth met his father. Hobart recalled, "He looked at me and said, "Hum! I couldn't lick you now, son." They never met again.

Bosworth signed with Julia Marlowe, who cast him in leads in Shakespearean plays.

Just as Bosworth began to taste stage stardom in New York, he was stricken with tuberculosis, a disease often fatal in the 19th and early 20th centuries. Bosworth was forced to give up the stage, and he was not allowed to exert himself indoors. Though he made a rapid recovery, he returned to the stage too quickly and suffered a relapse. For the rest of his working life, he balanced his acting with periods of rest so as to keep his tuberculosis in remission.

Bosworth moved to Tempe, Arizona, to partake of the climate to improve his health. Eventually, he got the disease under control again. While not severely handicapped, he was forced to remain in a warm climate lest he suffer a relapse. The disease robbed him of his voice as well, but there was a new medium for actors: silent films.

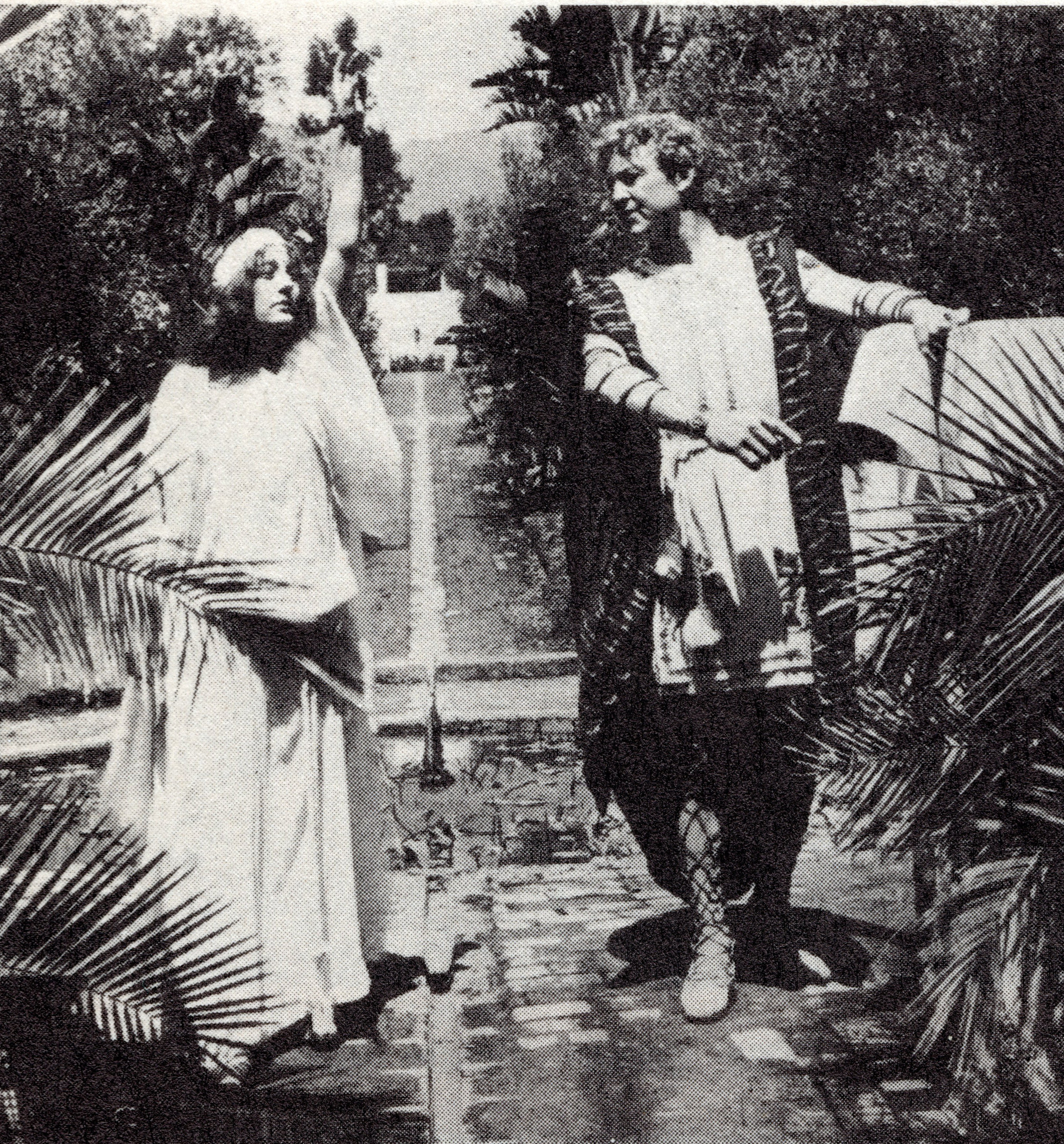
Betty Harte and Bosworth in The Roman (1910)

Bosworth moved to San Diego, and in 1908 he was contracted to make a motion picture by the Selig Polyscope Company. Shooting was to be done in the outdoors, and he did not have to use his voice, which was in poor condition. Bosworth once said, "I believe, after all, that it is the motion pictures that have saved my life. How could I have lived on and on, without being able to carry out any of my cherished ambitions? What would my life have meant? Here, in pictures, I am realizing my biggest hopes." Signing with the Selig Polyscope Co., Hobart eventually convinced the movie company to move to Los Angeles. Bosworth is widely credited with being the star of the first movie made on the West Coast.

Due to his role in pioneering the film industry in California, Bosworth often was referred to as the "Dean of Hollywood". He wrote the scenarios for the second and third pictures he acted in, and directed the third. According to his own count, he eventually wrote 112 scenarios and produced eighty-four pictures with Selig. Bosworth was attracted to Jack London's work due to his out-of-doors filming experience and the requirements of his health, which precluded acting in studios.

=== Hobart Bosworth Productions Company ===
D. W. Griffith also released a Jack London picture that year, Two Men of the Desert. Hobart followed up The Sea Wolf with The Chechako. The Chechako and some other Bosworth-London pictures were distributed through Paramount Pictures. Bosworth also directed the follow-up, The Valley of the Moon, in which had a supporting actor role. He also appeared as an actor in John Barleycorn, which he co-directed with J. Charles Haydon. He produced, directed, wrote, and acted in Martin Eden and An Odyssey of the North, playing the lead in the latter, which was released by Paramount. He finished up the series by producing, directing, and playing the lead in the two-part "Burning Daylight" series, The Adventures of Burning Daylight. Both were released by Paramount.

Soon Bosworth joined the Oliver Photography Company. Subsequently, Bosworth Inc. and Oliver Morosco Productions released a total of thirty-one pictures, most which starred Bosworth. The company ceased operations after producing The Sea Lion.

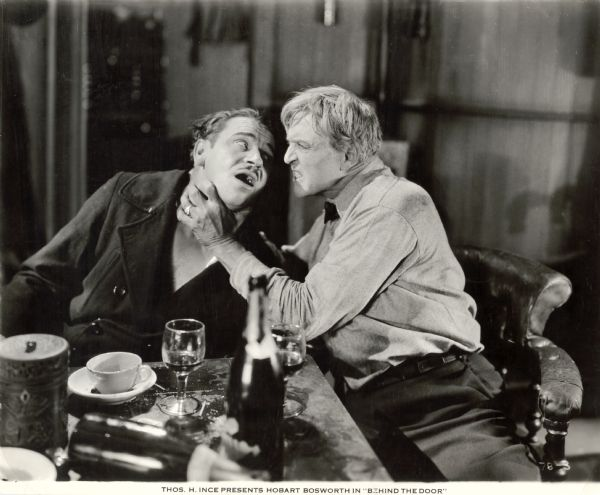
Still portraying German U-boat commander Brandt (left, Wallace Beery) being throttled by American merchant captain Krug (Bosworth) in Behind the Door (1919)

The merger with Paramount ended the period in Bosworth's creative life where he was a major force in the motion picture industry, which was undergoing changes as the industry matured and solidified. He directed one other picture before the merger, The White Scar, which he also wrote and starred in for the Universal Film Manufacturing Company. After his own production company closed, Hobart wound up playing supporting roles as an actor.

He divorced his first wife, Adele Farrington, in 1919. On 22 December 1920 he married Cecile Kibre, widow of G. Harold Percival, who had been art director at Ince Studio and who had died of influenza in 1918. Cecile Kibre had a son by Percival, named George, whom Hobart Bosworth later adopted as his son.

Bosworth survived motion pictures' transition to sound, or "talkies". Aside from appearing in Warner Brothers' showcase, The Show of Shows (1929), his talking debut proper was in the film short A Man in Peace, for Vitaphone, while his first sound feature was Vitaphone's Ruritanian romance General Crack, starring John Barrymore. Although he appeared in small roles in A-list films, Bosworth primarily made his living as a prominently billed character actor in B-Westerns and serials churned out by Poverty Row studios. In all his roles in A and B pictures, he usually was typecast in a fatherly role, as a clergyman, judge, grandparent, etc.

In 1931, Hobart was cast in principal role of fictional famed explorer in the Antarctic, in Frank Capra's "Dirigible" (1931). As the Hollywood production began, an old airfield in nearby Arcadia, California was converted into a set, complete with "artificial snow, fake ice mounds and painted backdrop attached to the back side of the dilapidated Army barracks." With principal photography slated for September, dry ice in metal containers stuffed in actor's mouths sufficed for the usual Arctic breath. In a 1972 interview, director Frank Capra, on TV's "Dick Cavett Show", Capra recalled a horrible accident on set. Capra asked actors to use dry ice encased in small cages in the mouth, to simulate foggy breath in the scene. Because the small cages were cumbersome in the mouth, a frustrated Hobart Bosworth removed the ice and popped it directly into his mouth for the scene. Soon, Bosworth was rushed to hospital with ice burns in his mouth, resulting in removal of some teeth, jaw bone, and tissue. Though recovery was intensive, Hobart resumed his screen career, continuing on to three dozen more films, through the 1930s, into the 1940s, until his death in 1943.

== Death and legacy ==
On December 30, 1943, Bosworth died of pneumonia in Glendale, California, aged 76. He was entombed in Glendale's Forest Lawn Memorial Park in the Grand Mausoleum's Utility Columbarium, niche 4616.

For his contributions to the film industry, Bosworth received a motion pictures star on the Hollywood Walk of Fame in 1960. The star is located at 6522 Hollywood Boulevard.

== Selected filmography ==
- The Count of Monte Cristo (1908) - Edmond Dantes (film debut)
- Dr. Jekyll and Mr. Hyde (1908, Short) - Dr. Jekyll / Mr. Hyde
- Rip Van Winkle (1908, Short) - Rip Van Winkle
- Damon and Pythias (1908, Short)
- The Spirit of '76 (1908, Short)
- On Thanksgiving Day (1908, Short)
- The Tenderfoot (1909, Short)
- Boots and Saddles (1909, Short)
- In the Badlands (1909, Short) - Carlton Langdon M.D.
- Fighting Bob (1909, Short) - Fighting Bob
- In the Sultan's Power (1909, Short)
- The Leopard Queen (1909, Short) - Captain Jack Ownes
- Across the Plains (1910, Short)
- The Wonderful Wizard of Oz (1910, Short) - Wizard of Oz and King
- Davy Crockett (1910, Short)
- The Sergeant (1910, Short extant) - Sergeant Robert Adams
- The Sanitarium (1910)
- The Padre (1911) - The Padre - Father Sebastian
- Brown of Harvard (1911) - (uncredited)
- The Other Fellow (1912, short)
- The Count of Monte Cristo (1912)
- Alas! Poor Yorick! (1913, Short) - The Theatre Manager
- The Sea Wolf (1913) - Wolf Larsen
- John Barleycorn (1914) - Scratch Nelson
- Valley of the Moon (1914) - Minor Role
- Martin Eden (1914)
- An Odyssey of the North (1914) - Naass
- Burning Daylight: The Adventures of 'Burning Daylight' in Alaska (1914) - Elam Harnish, aka 'Burning Daylight'
- Burning Daylight (1914)
- The Pursuit of the Phantom (1914) - Richard Alden
- Burning Daylight: The Adventures of 'Burning Daylight' in Civilization (1914) - Elam Harnish, 'Burning Daylight'
- The Country Mouse (1914) - Billy Bladerson
- Buckshot John (1915, Director) - 'Buckshot John' Moran
- Pretty Mrs. Smith (1915) - Minor Role (uncredited)
- Help Wanted (1915) - Jerrold D. Scott
- Little Sunset (1915) - Gus Bergstrom the 'Terrible Swede'
- The Scarlet Sin (1915) - Eric Norton
- Nearly a Lady (1915) - Minor Role as Frederica's Father (uncredited)
- A Little Brother of the Rich (1915) - Henry Leamington
- Business Is Business (1915) - Christ
- 'Twas Ever Thus (1915) - Hard Muscle / Col. Warren / John Rogers
- Fatherhood (1915) - Lon Gilchrist
- Colorado (1915) - Thomas Doyle
- The White Scar (1915) - Na-Ta-Wan-Gan
- The Beachcomber (1915) - The sailor
- Tainted Money (1915) - Big Tim
- The Target (1916) - Big Bill Brent
- The Yaqui (1916) - Tambor
- Two Men of Sandy Bar (1916) - John Oakhurst
- Doctor Neighbor (1916) - Dr. Neighbor
- The Iron Hand (1916) - Tim Noland
- The Way of the World (1916) - John Nevill
- Oliver Twist (1916) - Bill Sykes
- Joan the Woman (1916) - Gen. La Hire
- A Mormon Maid (1917) - John Hogue
- Freckles (1917) - John McLean
- Unconquered (1917) - Henry Jackson
- The Inner Shrine (1917) - Derek Pruyn
- The Little American (1917) - German Colonel
- What Money Can't Buy (1917) - Govrian Texler
- Betrayed (1917) - Leopoldo Juares
- The Woman God Forgot (1917) - Cortez
- The Devil-Stone (1917) - Robert Judson
- The Border Legion (1918) - Jack Kells
- Behind the Door (1919, extant; Library of Congress) - Oscar Krug
- Below the Surface (1920, extant; DVD) - Martin Flint
- His Own Law (1920, extant; Library of Congress) - J.C. MacNeir
- The Brute Master (1920) - Bucko McAllister, The Brute Master
- A Thousand to One (1920) - William Newlands
- The Foolish Matrons (1921) - Dr. Ian Fraser
- The Cup of Life (1921) - 'Bully' Brand
- Blind Hearts (1921, extant; Library of Congress) - Lars Larson
- The Sea Lion (1921, extant; Library of Congress, DVD) - John Nelson
- White Hands (1922) - 'Hurricane Hardy'
- The Strangers' Banquet (1922) - Shane Keogh
- Man Alone (1923) - Ben Dixon
- Little Church Around the Corner (1923) - John Morton
- Vanity Fair (1923) - Marquis of Steyne
- Rupert of Hentzau (1923) - Col. Sapt
- The Common Law (1923) - Henry Neville
- The Eternal Three (1923) - Dr. Frank R. Walters
- In the Palace of the King (1923) - Mendoza
- The Man Life Passed By (1923) - 'Iron Man' Moore
- Through the Dark (1924) - Warden
- Name the Man (1924) - Christian Stowell
- Nellie, the Beautiful Cloak Model (1924) - Thomas Lipton / Robert Horton
- The Woman on the Jury (1924) - Judge Davis
- Captain January (1924) - Jeremiah Judkins
- Bread (1924) - Mr. Corey
- The Silent Watcher (1924) - John Steele, 'The Chief'
- Hearts of Oak (1924) - Terry Dunnivan
- Hello, 'Frisco (1924) - John Brent
- If I Marry Again (1925) - John Jordan
- My Son (1925) - Sheriff Ellery Parker
- Chickie (1925) - Jonathan
- Zander the Great (1925) - The Sheriff
- The Half-Way Girl (1925) - John Guthrie
- Winds of Chance (1925) - Sam Kirby
- The Big Parade (1925) - Mr. Apperson
- Steel Preferred (1925) - James Creeth
- The Golden Strain (1925) - Maj. Milton Mulford
- The Far Cry (1926) - Julian Marsh
- The Nervous Wreck (1926) - Jud Morgan
- Spangles (1926) - Robert 'Big Bill' Bowman
- Three Hours (1927) - Jonathan Durkin
- Annie Laurie (1927) - The MacDonald Chieftain
- The Blood Ship (1927) - Jim Newman
- The Chinese Parrot (1927) - P.J. Madden
- My Best Girl (1927) - Robert Merrill
- The Smart Set (1928) - Mr. Durant
- Freckles (1928) - McLean
- After the Storm (1928) - Manin Dane
- Hangman's House (1928) - Lord Justice O'Brien
- The Sawdust Paradise (1928) - Isaiah
- Annapolis (1928) - Father
- A Woman of Affairs (1928) - Sir Morton Holderness
- Eternal Love (1929) - Rev. Tass
- Hurricane (1929) - Hurricane Martin
- The Show of Shows (1929) - Executioner - Guillotine Sequence
- General Crack (1929) - Count Hensdorff
- King of the Mountain (1929)
- Mammy (1930) - Meadows
- The Devil's Holiday (1930) - Ezra Stone
- The Office Wife (1930) - McGowan
- Abraham Lincoln (1930) - General Robert E. Lee
- Du Barry, Woman of Passion (1930) - Duc de Brissac
- The Third Alarm (1930) - Precinct Fire Captain
- Just Imagine (1930) - Z-4
- Sit Tight (1931) - Dunlap
- Dirigible (1931) - Louis Rondelle
- Shipmates (1931) - Admiral Corbin
- This Modern Age (1931) - Robert Blake Sr.
- Fanny Foley Herself (1931) - Seely
- Carnival Boat (1932) - Jim Gannon
- The Miracle Man (1932) - The Patriarch
- The County Fair (1932) - Col. Ainsworth
- The Last of the Mohicans (1932, Serial) - Chingachgook, 'the Sagamore'
- No Greater Love (1932) - Doctor
- Million Dollar Legs (1932) - Olympics Starter (uncredited)
- The Phantom Express (1932) - Mr. Harrington
- Lady for a Day (1933) - Governor
- Whom the Gods Destroy (1934) - Alec Klein
- Music in the Air (1934) - Cornelius
- The Keeper of the Bees (1935) - Michael the Bee Master
- Together We Live (1935) - Col. Dickenson
- The Crusades (1935) - Frederick - Duke of the Germans
- Steamboat Round the Bend (1935) - Chaplain
- The Dark Hour (1936) - Charles Carson
- Wolves of the Sea (1936) - Capt. Wolf Hansen
- Wildcat Trooper (1936) - Dr. Martin
- General Spanky (1936) - Col. Blanchard
- Portia on Trial (1937) - Governor
- The Secret of Treasure Island (1938, Serial) - Dr. X
- Rollin' Plains (1938) - John Gospel Moody
- King of the Sierras (1938) - Uncle Hank
- Bullets for O'Hara (1941) - Judge
- One Foot in Heaven (1941) - Richard Hardy Case (uncredited)
- Law of the Tropics (1941) - Davis
- They Died with Their Boots On (1941) - Mr. Cartwright (uncredited)
- Wild Bill Hickok Rides (1942) - Fanatic in Chicago (uncredited)
- Bullet Scars (1942) - Dr. Sidney Carter
- I Was Framed (1942) - D.L. Wallace
- Escape from Crime (1942) - Chaplain (uncredited)
- The Gay Sisters (1942) - Clergyman at Wedding (uncredited)
- Sin Town (1942) - Humiston (final film role)
