= Myrtle Stedman =

American actress (1883–1938)

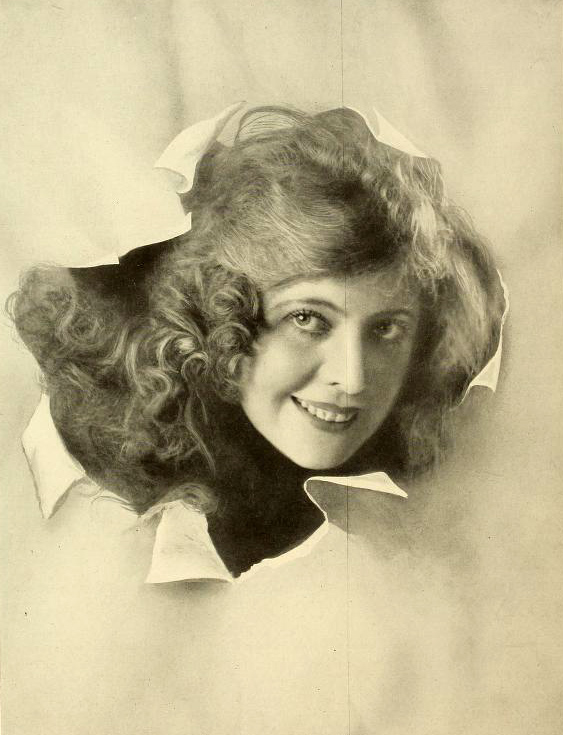
- Stedman in 1917
- Born: Myrtle Lincoln; March 3, 1883; Chicago, Illinois, U.S.
- Died: January 8, 1938 (aged 54); Hollywood, California, U.S.
- Occupation: Actress
- Years active: 1910–1938
- Spouse: Marshall Stedman (m.1900-div.1920)
- Children: Lincoln Stedman

Myrtle Stedman (born Myrtle Lincoln; March 3, 1883 – January 8, 1938) was an American leading lady and later character actress in motion pictures who began in silent films in 1910.

== Biography ==
Stedman was born Myrtle Lincoln in Chicago, Illinois, and educated at Mrs. Starett's School there and at the Chicago School of Acting. She and her family moved to Colorado because of her father's mining interests there.

Stedman performed in light opera and musical comedies in Chicago. Her voice was cultivated in France. Her tutor was Marchesi, who was known as one of the finest instructors of voice culture in his country.

She married Marshall Stedman, a drama school conductor, in January 1900. They had one child together, Lincoln Stedman, before divorcing in 1920.

In 1915, Stedman became the first woman elected to the Motion Picture Board of Trade of America.

== Music career ==
Stedman debuted in Chicago as a solo dancer with the Whitney Opera Company. She did not enter the field of opera because of her preference for light opera. She starred for a number of seasons in Isle of Spice and The Chocolate Soldier. She performed for a year at the Whitney Theater in Chicago and was a prima donna of the Chicago Grand Opera Company.

== Film career ==
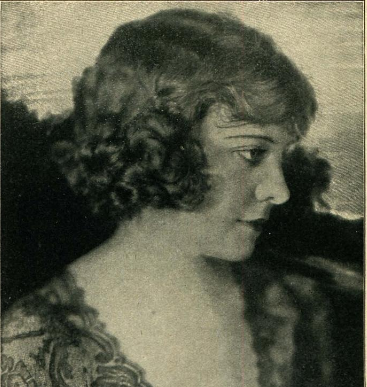
Myrtle Stedman, in The Famous Mrs. Fair (1923)

Her first appearances in movies, beginning in 1910, were in Selig studio Western and action short films. She was the only female member of Selig's company at that time, making her the female lead in all of that studio's Westerns. Among her feature films are Flaming Youth, The Valley of the Moon, The Dangerous Age, and The Famous Mrs. Fair.

After Selig, Stedman joined the Hobart Bosworth Productions Company. She also worked for Metro-Goldwyn-Mayer and Famous Players–Lasky studios. She retired in 1931, but in 1936, she was signed by Warner Brothers to play bit and extra roles.. A contract with Warner Bros. was in effect at the time of her death.

In 1917, Stedman toured the United States for 10 weeks, making personal appearances at theaters that had shown her films. After the tour, she planned to go to New York to form her own company to make films.

Her last release was Accidents Will Happen, in 1938.

== Death ==
On January 8, 1938, Stedman died of a heart attack at age 54. She was interred at Inglewood Park Cemetery, Inglewood, California.

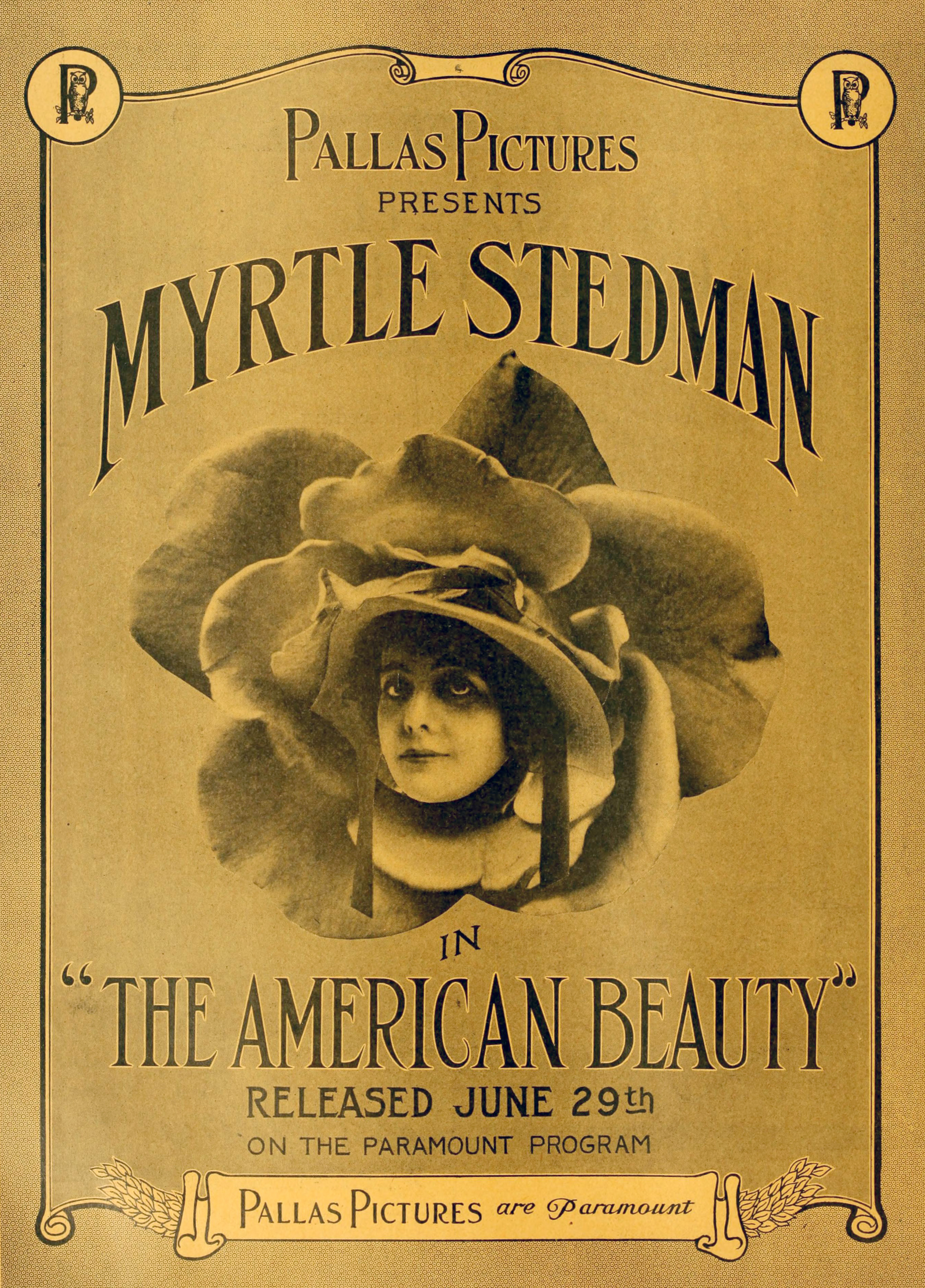
Stedman in The American Beauty (1916)

== Partial filmography ==
- The Telltale Knife (1911)
- When the Heart Calls (1912)
- The Cattle Thief's Escape (1913)
- Valley of the Moon (1914)
- Martin Eden (1914)
- Hypocrites (1915)
- The Wild Olive (1915)
- Nearly a Lady (1915)
- Jane (1915)
- The American Beauty (1916)
- The Soul of Kura San (1916)
- As Men Love (1917)
- The World Apart (1917)
- In the Hollow of Her Hand (1918)
- In Honor's Web (1919)
- Sex (1920)
- The Tiger's Coat (1920)
- The Silver Horde (1920)
- Harriet and the Piper (1920)
- Old Dad (1920)
- The Whistle (1921)
- Sowing the Wind (1921)
- Black Roses (1921)
- Nancy from Nowhere (1922)
- The Hands of Nara (1922)
- Ashes (1922)
- Rich Men's Wives (1922)
- Reckless Youth (1922)
- The Dangerous Age (1923)
- Temporary Marriage (1923)
- The Famous Mrs. Fair (1923)
- Six Days (1923)
- Crashin' Thru (1923)
- The Age of Desire (1923)
- Flaming Youth (1923)
- Lilies of the Field (1924)
- The Woman on the Jury (1924)
- The Breath of Scandal (1924)
- Judgment of the Storm (1924)
- Bread (1924)
- Wine (1924)
- The Mad Whirl (1925)
- Sally (1925)
- Chickie (1925)
- Tessie (1925)
- The Far Cry (1926)
- The Prince of Pilsen (1926)
- The Man in the Shadow (1926)
- Don Juan's Three Nights (1926)
- The Black Diamond Express (1927)
- The Life of Riley (1927)
- The Irresistible Lover (1927)
- Alias the Deacon (1928)
- Their Hour (1928)
- The Jazz Age (1929)
- The Wheel of Life (1929)
- The Love Racket (1929) (sound remake of The Woman on the Jury)
- Lummox (1930)
- The Truth About Youth (1930)
- Beau Ideal (1931)
- The Widow in Scarlet (1932)
- Forbidden Company (1932)
- Alias Mary Smith (1932)
- Klondike (1932)
- Beggars in Ermine (1934)
- School for Girls (1935)
- Give Me Liberty (1936)
