= Marshall Stedman =

American actor

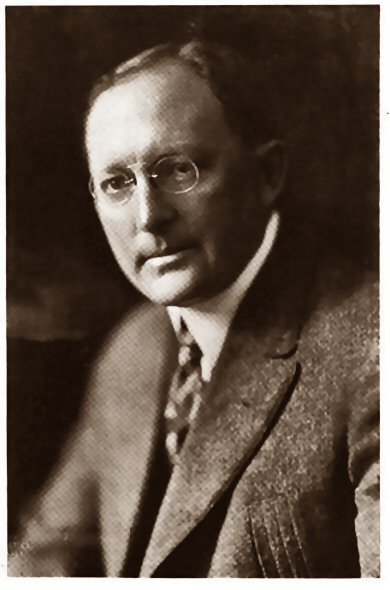
- Who’s Who in the Film World, 1914
- Born: Edward Marshall Stedman Jr. August 16, 1874; Bethel, Maine, US
- Died: December 16, 1943 (aged 69); Laguna Beach, California, US
- Occupations: Actor, director, author, drama teacher
- Spouse(s): Myrtle Stedman (m.1900-div.1920); Rieka Kulaars
- Children: Lincoln Stedman

Marshall Stedman (August 16, 1874 – December 16, 1943) was an American stage and silent screen actor/director, playwright, author and drama teacher.

== Early life ==
Edward Marshall Stedman Jr. was born in Bethel, Maine, the son of Edward Sr. and Eliza Putnam (née Rice) Stedman. His father was a decorated naval officer who at the time of his death in 1939 had been the oldest surviving graduate of the United States Naval Academy and one of only three retired naval officers who saw service during the American Civil War. Stedman received his early education in Chicago at South Division High School and the Harvard Preparatory School before attending Colorado College in Colorado Springs.

== Career ==
Stedman began his theater career at around the age of eighteen with William Morris’ stock company playing Bob Appleton in Ludwig Fulda’s three-act drama The Lost Paradise, and Ned Annesley in Sowing the Wind, a four-act play by Sydney Grundy. He later joined E. H. Sothern for two seasons and went on to star in a number of one-act plays and tour in Shakespearean repertoire productions.

For some years around 1900 Stedman lived in Gilpin County, Colorado with his father, sister Agnes, grandmother Miriam, uncle Josiah Stedman and later his wife Myrtle. News reports of the day indicated his family was involved in a mining venture near America City called the Charlemagne Lode.

In 1906, Stedman was named head of the drama school at the Chicago Musical College, a position he would hold for some four years. Later he spent a season in vaudeville before venturing into film work as a director with Essanay Studios and later the Selig Polyscope Company, as an actor, director, writer and producer. Several years later Stedman returned to teaching as a drama instructor with the Eagan School of Drama and Music in Los Angeles.

In the years that followed, Marshall Stedman would continue to teach, act and write. He played a number of villain roles in films made by Hobart Bosworth and returned to the stage in community theater productions performed by his students, often in plays he wrote. In the late 1920s Stedman founded the Marshall Stedman School of Drama and Elocution in Culver City, California.

== Marriage ==
On January 13, 1900, Marshall Stedman married in Chicago Myrtle C. Lincoln, a young actress not yet seventeen. Lincoln Stedman, their only child, was born in 1907 and would go on to have his own career in Hollywood. Stedman and his wife separated around 1919 and a divorce soon followed. He later married Rieka Kulaars, a native of The Netherlands.

== Death ==
Marshall Stedman died at the age of 69 on December 16, 1943, in Laguna Beach. He was survived by his son Lincoln who would die himself before the close of the decade.

== Selected works ==
Steadman starred in Circumstantial Evidence (1912), directed by Otis Thayer and produced by Selig Polyscope. Considered long lost it is included in the Dawson Film Find with excerpts and a reference in the documentary Dawson City : Frozen in Time (2016).

- What a Kiss Can Do: And Other Recitations for Children, 1925
- Readings and Encores for Children and Grown-Ups, 1926
- Readings and Sketches for Boys, 1927
- Monologues, Distinctive and Different, 1927
- Samanthy's Suitors: A Character Sketch for a Lady, 1928
- Clever Monologues, 1928
- Sure-Fire Monologues, 1928
- Loving Lunatics: A Farce Comedy in One Act, 1929
- The Missionary to Zulu Land: A Farce Comedy on One Act, 1929
- Tonic: A farce in One Act, 1929
- Out of the Storm: A play in One Act for Two Women, 1929
- Unique Monologues and Recitations for Children, 1929
- Mr. Santa Claus: A Play in One Act, 1930
- Marshall Stedman's New Book of Readings and Monologues, 1931
- Speakin' Day: A Comedy of School Days in One Act, 1931
- A Shot in The Dark: A Comedy Mystery-Drama in One Act, 1931
- The Bloom of Youth: A Farce Comedy in One Act for Three Women, 1931
- The Hoodooed Hindu: A Farce Comedy in One Act, 1931
- Readings and Recitations for Special Days, 1931
- Fifty-Fifty: A Comedy Drama in One Act, 1931
- Clever Sketches for Short Casts, 1932
- Twelve Little Plays for Two Little Players, 1932
- The Old Bachelor's Christmas: A Dramatic Reading (Banner plays), 1932
- Stedman's Readings and Monologues for Children: A Collection of Forty-Eight Readings, Monologues, Recitations, Encores, Play-O-Logues and Novelty Acts, 1932
- Thirty-Two Readings, Monologues and Play-O-Logues for Grown-Ups, 1934
- Amusing Monologues, 1940
- Eight Two Character Stunt Plays, 1946
