= Gambier's Advocate =

1915 film by James Kirkwood

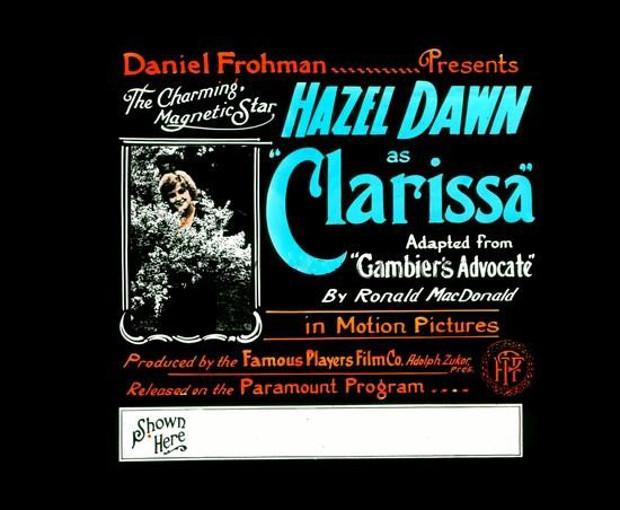
- Glass slide for the film
- Directed by: James Kirkwood Sr.
- Screenplay by: Ronald MacDonald
- Based on: Gambier's Advocate by Ronald McDonald
- Produced by: Daniel Frohman; Adolph Zukor
- Starring: Hazel Dawn; James Kirkwood Sr. Fuller Mellish; Dorothy Bernard; Robert Broderick; Maude Odell
- Production company: Famous Players Film Company
- Distributed by: Paramount Pictures
- Release date: June 17, 1915
- Running time: 5 reels
- Country: United States
- Language: Silent...English intertitles

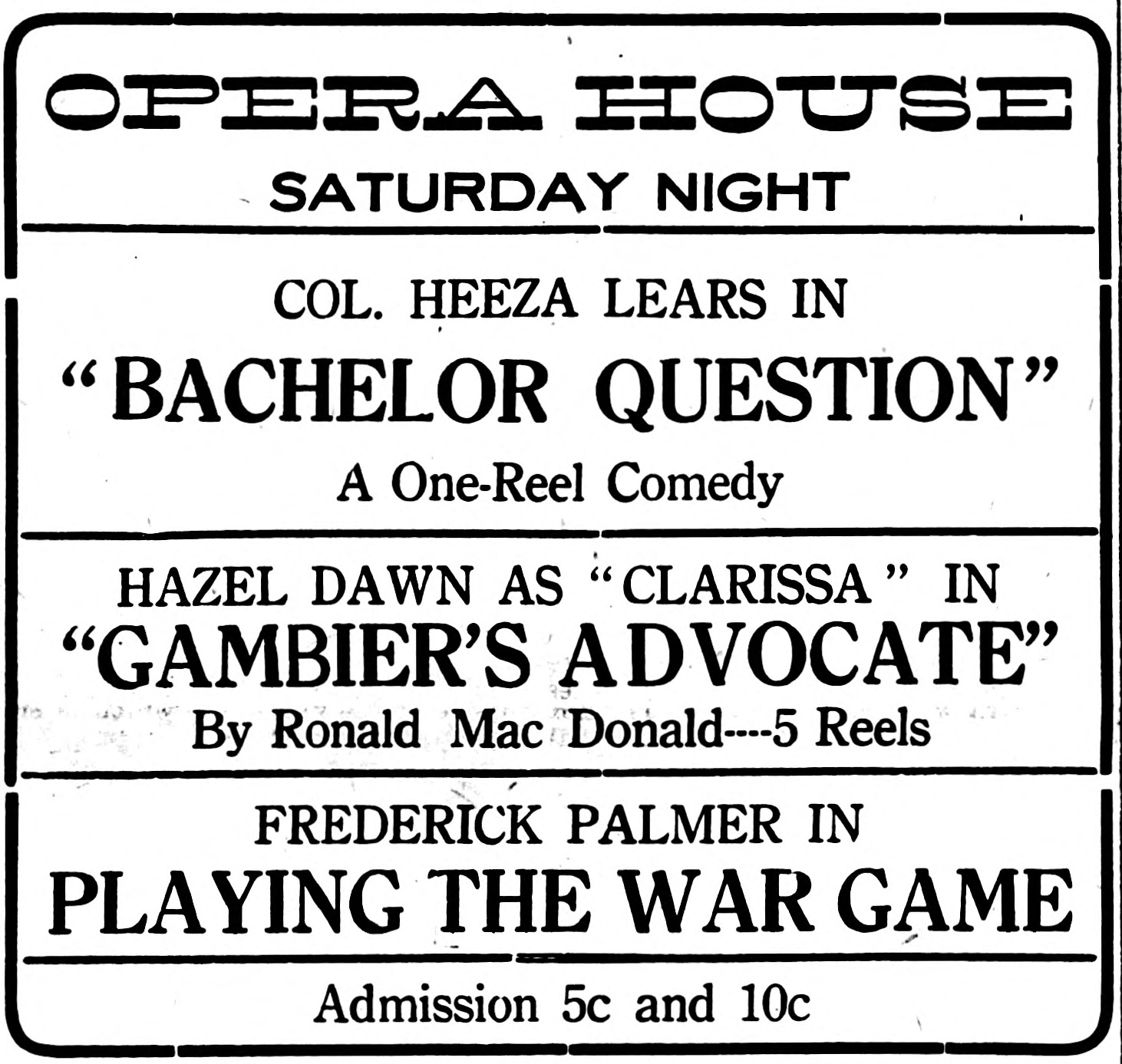
Contemporary newspaper advertisement

Gambier's Advocate is a lost 1915 American drama silent film directed by James Kirkwood Sr. and written by Ronald MacDonald. The film stars Hazel Dawn, James Kirkwood Sr., Fuller Mellish, Dorothy Bernard, Robert Broderick and Maude Odell. The film was released on June 17, 1915, by Paramount Pictures.

== Cast ==
- Hazel Dawn as Clarissa
- James Kirkwood Sr. as Stephen Gambier
- Fuller Mellish as Cyrus Vane
- Dorothy Bernard as Gene Vane
- Robert Broderick as Mr. Muir
- Maude Odell as Mrs. Muir
