= Niobe (film) =

1915 film by Hugh Ford

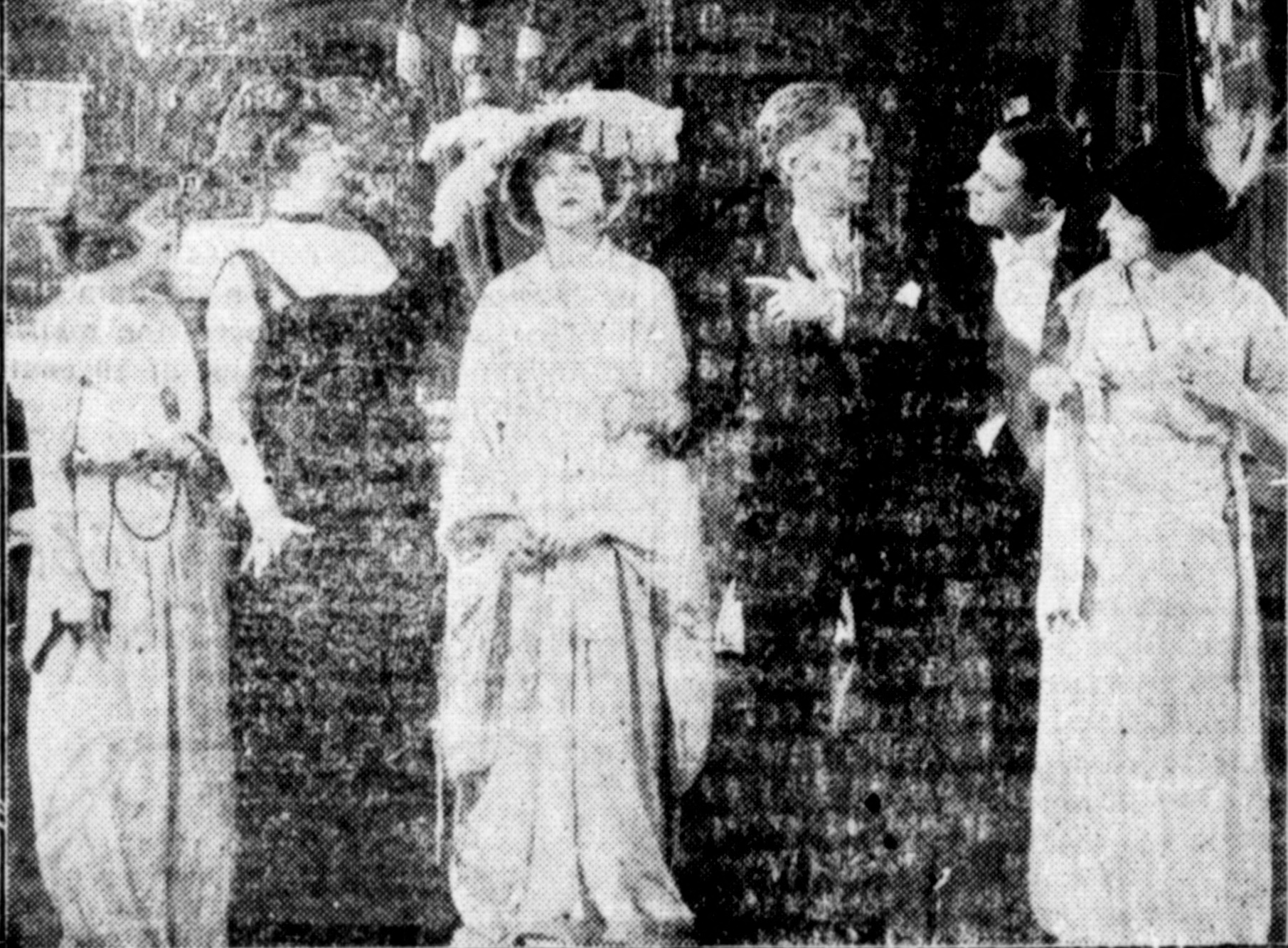
- Scene from the film.
- Directed by: Hugh Ford; Edwin S. Porter
- Screenplay by: Edward A. Paulton (play); Harry Paulton (play)
- Produced by: Daniel Frohman
- Starring: Hazel Dawn; Charles S. Abbe; Maude Odell; Marie Leonard; Reginald Denny; Irene Haisman
- Production company: Famous Players Film Company
- Distributed by: Paramount Pictures
- Release date: April 4, 1915
- Country: United States
- Language: English

Niobe is a 1915 American comedy silent film directed by Hugh Ford and Edwin S. Porter and written by Edward A. Paulton and Harry Paulton based upon their play. The film stars Hazel Dawn, Charles S. Abbe, Maude Odell, Marie Leonard, Reginald Denny and Irene Haisman. The film was released April 4, 1915, by Paramount Pictures.

== Plot ==
This film is based on the Greek story of Niobe. Niobe was the daughter of Tautolus, and the wife of Amphion. Her pride in her children provoked Apollo, who cursed all of them. Niobe was then so overcome with grief, she turned into a stone statue, which gushed fountains of tears. The statue is then bought by Tompkins, an artist, who has it insured by the company of which Peter Amos Dunn is president, who takes the statue to his own home for security purposes. Electricians, wiring the house, leave live wires at the feet of the statue, and suddenly Niobe steps from her stone pedestal and confronts Dunn. He is at a loss to explain the presence of a goddess to his family. But he remembers that a governess, who sent her trunks to him, is expected in a day or two. Dunn decides to dress up Niobe as the governess and introducing her to his wife and daughters as the actual governess.

== Cast ==
- Hazel Dawn as Niobe
- Charles S. Abbe as Peter Amos Dunn
- Maude Odell as Caroline Dunn
- Marie Leonard as Helen
- Reginald Denny as Cornelius Griffin
- Irene Haisman as Beatrice Sillocks
- John Merkyl as Tompkins (*aka Wilmuth Merkyl)

== Production ==
Niobe was partially shot on location at George Jay Gould's Georgian Court home, which is now part of Georgian Court University.
