= The Saleslady =

1916 film by Frederick A. Thomson

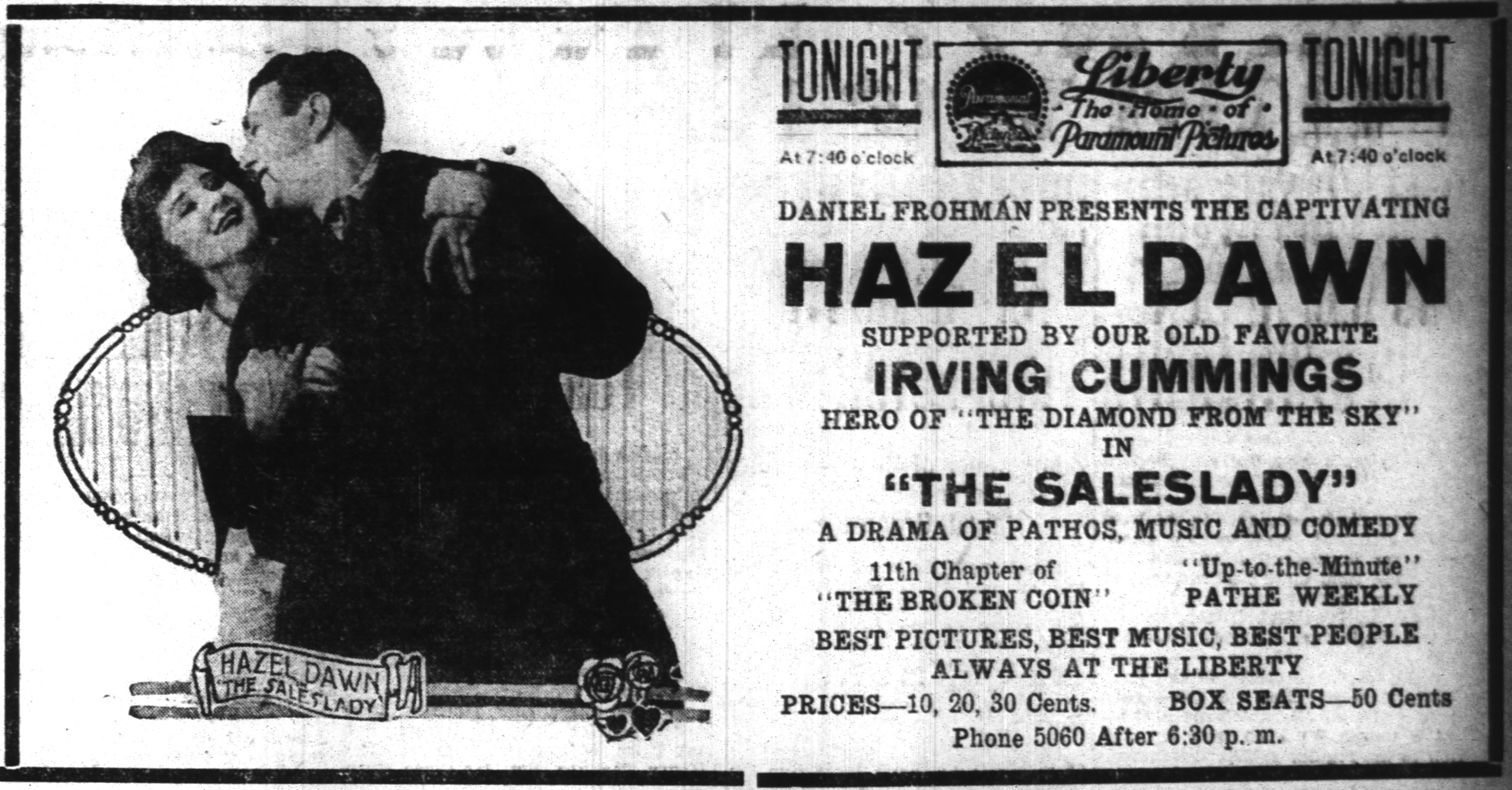
- Newspaper advertisement
- Directed by: Frederick A. Thomson
- Story by: Willard Mack
- Starring: Hazel Dawn; Irving Cummings; Dorothy Rogers; Clarence Handyside; Arthur Morrison
- Production company: Famous Players Film Company
- Distributed by: Paramount Pictures
- Release date: March 23, 1916
- Running time: 50 minutes
- Country: United States
- Language: English

The Saleslady is a 1916 American drama silent film directed by Frederick A. Thomson and written by Willard Mack. The film stars Hazel Dawn, Irving Cummings, Dorothy Rogers, Clarence Handyside and Arthur Morrison. The film was released on March 23, 1916, by Paramount Pictures.

== Cast ==
- Hazel Dawn as Helen
- Irving Cummings as Bruce
- Dorothy Rogers as Lizzie
- Clarence Handyside as Bruce's Father
- Arthur Morrison as Officer Burke
