= His Wife =

His Wife may refer to:

- His Wife (1915 film), an American silent drama film
- His Wife (2014 film), a French psychological drama film
