= The Heart of Jennifer =

1915 film by James Kirkwood

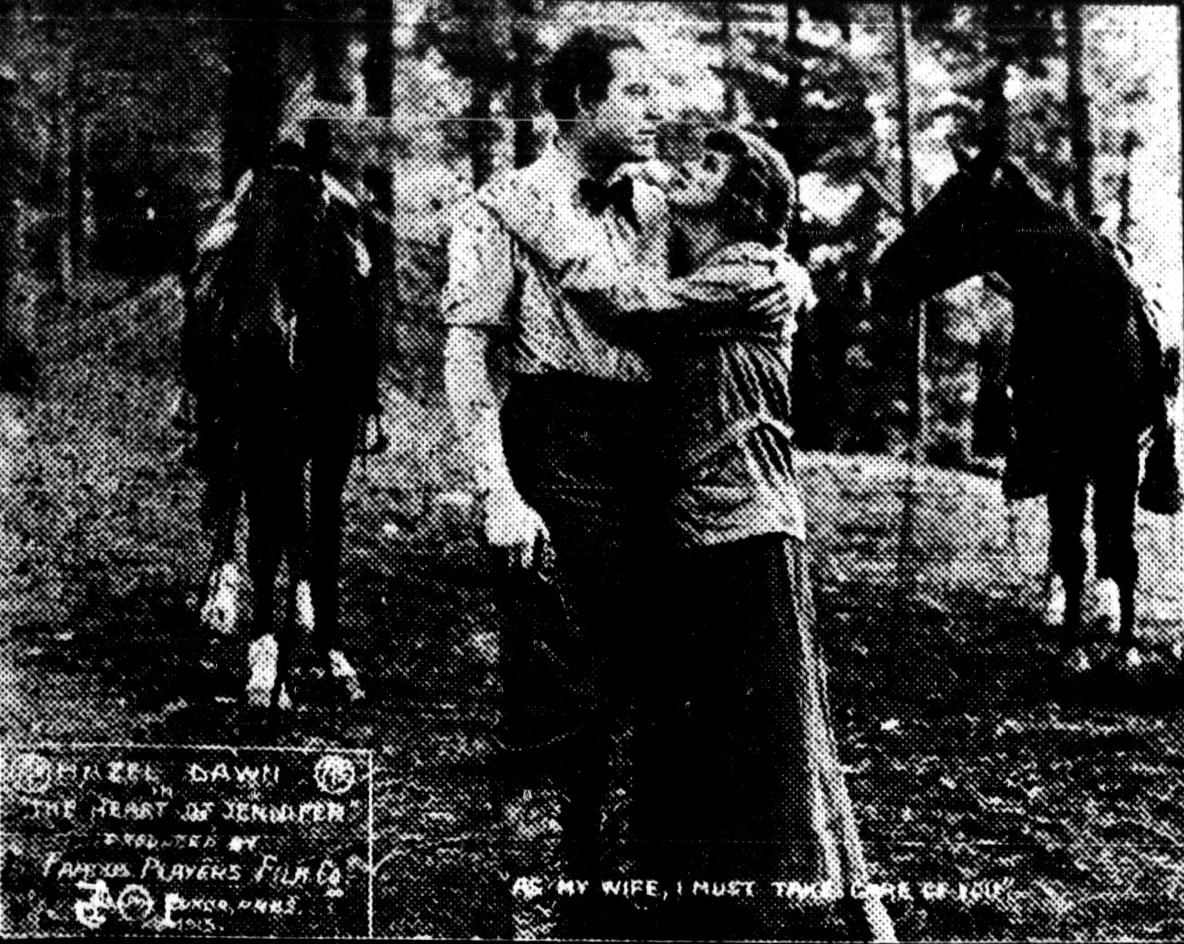
- Scene from the film
- Directed by: James Kirkwood Sr.
- Story by: Edith Barnard Delano
- Produced by: Daniel Frohman
- Starring: Hazel Dawn; James Kirkwood Sr. Irene Howley; Russell Bassett; Harry C. Browne
- Production company: Famous Players Film Company
- Distributed by: Paramount Pictures
- Release date: August 30, 1915
- Running time: 5 reels
- Country: United States
- Language: Silent (English intertitles)

The Heart of Jennifer is a 1915 American silent drama film directed by James Kirkwood Sr. and written by Edith Barnard Delano. The film stars Hazel Dawn, James Kirkwood Sr., Irene Howley, Russell Bassett, and Harry C. Browne. The film was released on August 30, 1915, by Paramount Pictures.

== Plot ==
A man gives aid to another man on the condition that he can marry the man's daughter. The daughter refuses and goes to a lumber camp with her father. At the lumber camp she marries a man named James Murry. The first man finds her and convinces her husband that she only married him for the money. This causes problems in their relationship. The man ends up getting her sister pregnant too and when he refuses to marry her, the sister kills him. To protect her sister the woman claims to have done it. The lumber camp man realizes his wife was only sacrificing herself for her sister, and that effort helps to reunite the couple.

== Cast ==
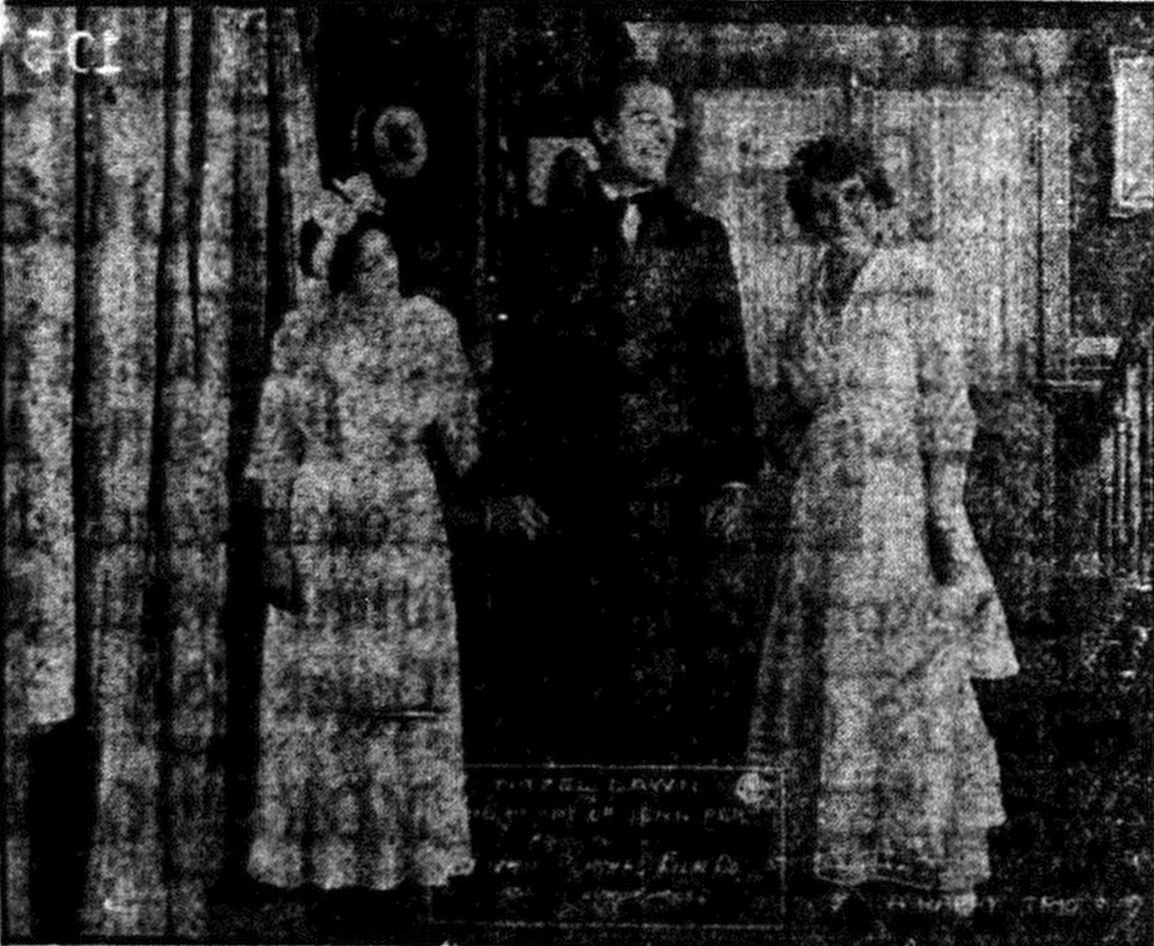
Scene from the film.

- Hazel Dawn as Jennifer Hale
- James Kirkwood Sr. as James Murray
- Irene Howley as Agnes Murray
- Russell Bassett as Mr. Hale, Jennifer's Father
- Harry C. Browne as Stephen Weldon

== Preservation ==
No prints of the film have survived. It is now lost.
