= Harry C. Browne =

American banjo player, actor, and religious leader

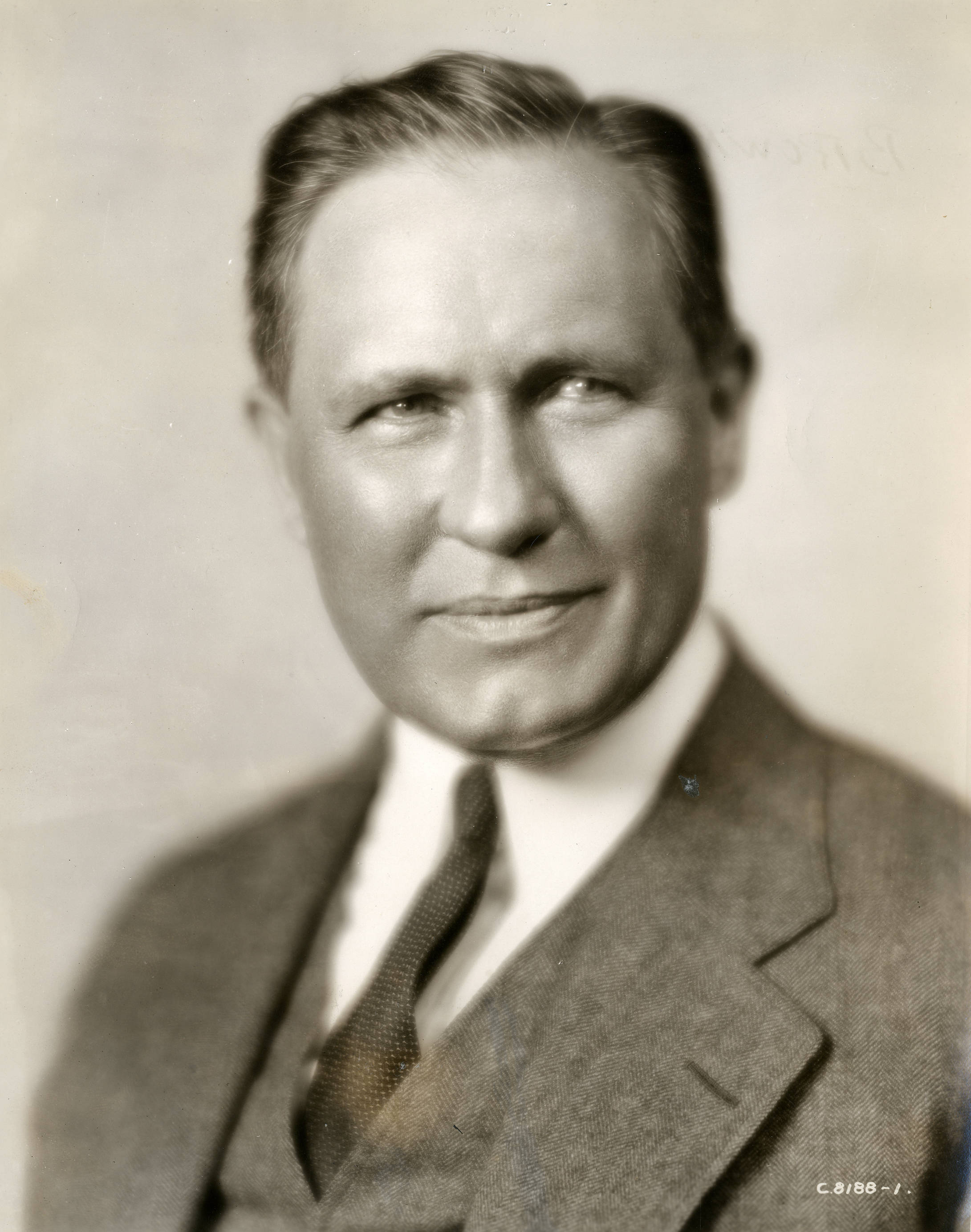
- Brown in 1930

President of the First Church of Christ, Scientist
- In office June 7, 1948 – November 15, 1954

Personal details
- Born: August 18, 1878 North Adams, Massachusetts, U.S.
- Died: November 15, 1954 (aged 76) Boston, Massachusetts, U.S.
- Children: 1 adopted daughter
- Occupation: Musician; actor; religious leader

Military service
- Allegiance: United States
- Years of service: 1898–1900
- Unit: Second Massachusetts U.S. Volunteers
- Battles/wars: Spanish–American War

Harry Clinton Browne (August 18, 1878 – November 15, 1954) was an American banjo player, actor, and religious leader, who appeared on stage and in silent films and recorded for Columbia Records in the 1910s and 1920s.

== Biography ==
Browne was born on August 18, 1878, in North Adams, Massachusetts to Isaac Snell Browne and Elizabeth Tobin. He married Edith Elizabeth Jackson on November 7, 1900, and the couple had one adopted daughter, Jane Elizabeth Browne. Before his acting career, he served in the Second Massachusetts U.S. Volunteers during the Spanish–American War and had a brief career campaigning for the Democratic Party. William Jennings Bryan, then the Secretary of State, offered Browne a diplomatic position in February 1914 but the latter declined. Browne later worked for a stock company as an actor, casting him in plays such as Arizona and Rebecca of Sunnybrook Farm in the early 1900s.

A skilled banjo player, Browne performed in vaudeville for seven years before recording a series of songs for Columbia Records, starting in 1916. His first record, perhaps his most well-known, is a re-interpretation of the American folk song "Turkey in the Straw". Released in March 1916, Browne appropriated the standard as a coon song, re-titled it "Nigger Love a Watermelon, Ha! Ha! Ha!" and wrote the lyrics for it. It is commonly referred to as one of the most racist songs in American music. Columbia Records continued to promote it up to 1925. The song relied heavily on the watermelon stereotype, a belief popularized in the 19th century that African-Americans had an unusual appetite for watermelons. For the B-side, Browne chose to record the minstrel show favorite "Old Dan Tucker", marking the tune's first commercial appearance on a major label.

Browne began studying Christian Science in 1910 and became an official adherent of the religion by gaining membership in The Christian Science Mother Church in 1916. He later also became a member of a branch church, the First Church of Christ, Scientist, Flushing, NY, where he was a member of its Board of Trustees. He received Christian Science Class Instruction in 1919. In 1928, he joined the Second Church of Christ, Scientist, New York City, where he served as First Reader and three years as a member and chairman of its Board of Trustees. Church bylaws require that Christian Science practitioners who are listed in The Christian Science Journal give up secular careers in order to be "on duty" 24 hours a day, 7 days a week. In 1931, he resigned from his entertainment work to practice Christian Science full time. He was First Reader of The Mother Church in 1938. He was also a Member of the Board of Lectureship of The Mother Church. On June 7, 1948 he was elected president of The First Church of Christ, Scientist.

Between 1906 and 1925, Browne appeared in at least 14 Broadway shows, including Oh, Lady! Lady!! His feature length film debut is believed to have been in August 1914 with the release of The Eagle's Mate, although he appeared in a number of shorter films before that. During his acting career, Browne had roles in notable films such as The Unwelcome Mrs. Hatch, The Heart of Jennifer, and Closed Doors. Afterwards, he worked as an announcer and production director for CBS radio until 1931.

Browne died in Boston on November 15, 1954 at the age of 76 and buried in Union Cemetery in Quaker Hill, Connecticut.

== Selected filmography ==
Source: IMDb

- The Eagle's Mate (1914) as Fisher Morne
- The Heart of Jennifer (1915) as Stephen Weldon
- The Flower of No Man's Land (1916) as Big Bill
- The Big Sister (1916) as Rodney Channing
- Scandal (1917) as Pelham Franklin
- The Inn of the Blue Moon (1918) as Warde MacMahon
- The Battler (1919) as Duncan Hart
- Know Your Men (1921) as John Barrett
- Closed Doors (1921) as Jim Ranson
- Moral Fibre (1921) as George Elmore
