= One of Our Girls =

One of Our girls
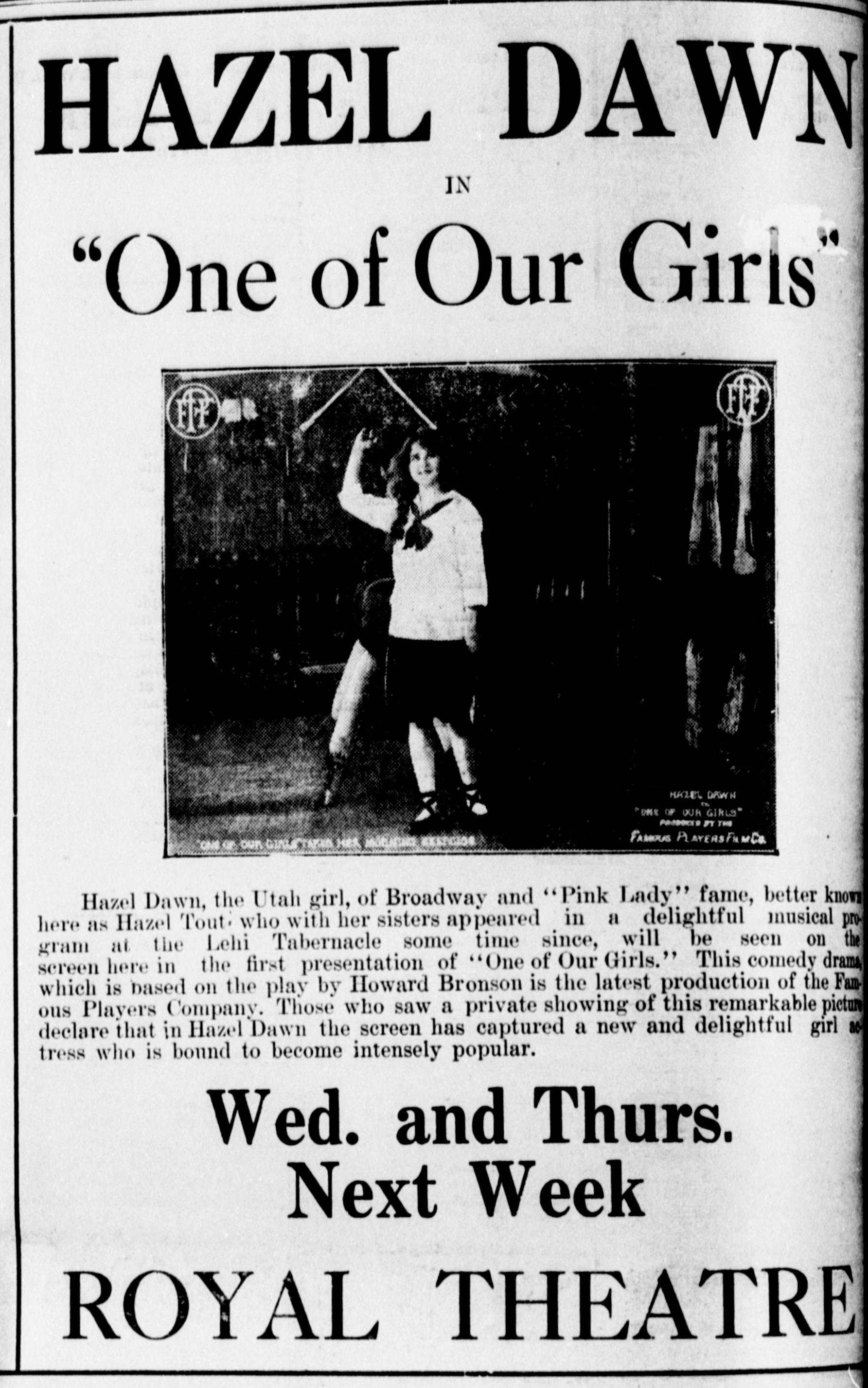
- Newspaper advertisement
- Directed by: Thomas N. Heffron
- Written by: Eve Unsell
- Based on: play One of Our Girls by Bronson Howard c.1885
- Produced by: Adolph Zukor; Daniel Frohman
- Starring: Hazel Dawn
- Distributed by: State Rights
- Release date: June 10, 1914
- Running time: 4 reels
- Country: USA
- Language: Silent..English titles

One of Our Girls is a lost 1914 American silent drama film directed by Thomas N. Heffron and starring Hazel Dawn. It was adapted from the play of the same name by Bronson Howard and was produced by Famous Players Film Company and Daniel Frohman.

== Cast ==
- Hazel Dawn as Kate Shipley
- Hal Clarendon as Comte Florian de Crebellon
- Lionel Adams as Captain John Gregory
- Fania Marinoff as Julie Fonblanque
- Camilla Dalberg as Mme. Fonblanque
- Charles Krauss as M. Fonblanque
- David Powell as M. Henri de St. Hillaire
- George Backus as Dr. Girodet
- Clarence Handyside as Mr. Shipley
- Rolinda Bainbridge as Sylvia de Crebillon
