= The Ring and the Man =

1914 film

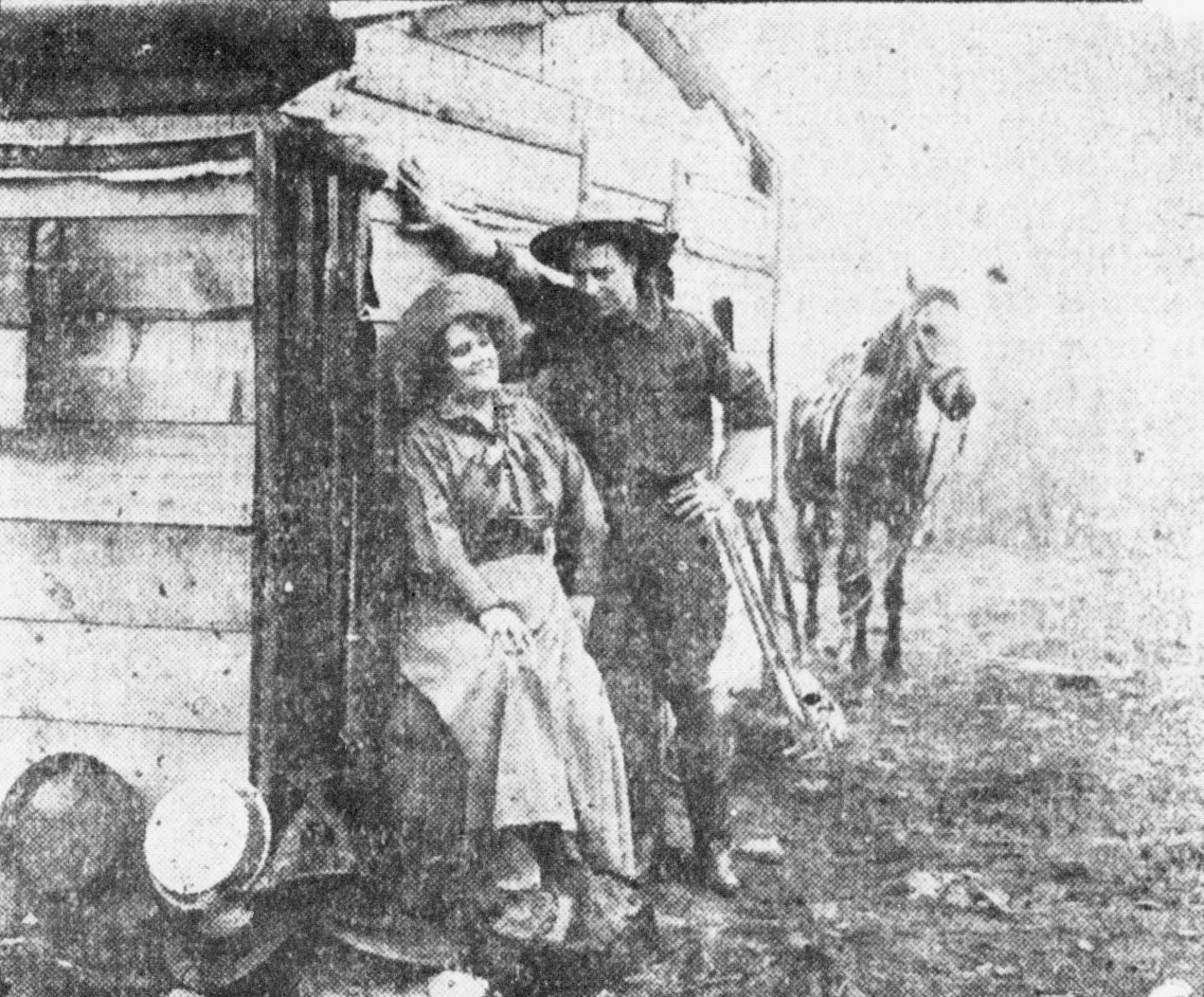
- Scene from the film
- Directed by: Francis Powers
- Written by: Cyrus Townsend Brady(novel)
- Based on: his novel The Ring and the Man c.1909
- Produced by: Adolph Zukor
- Starring: Bruce McRae
- Distributed by: State Rights
- Release date: May 20, 1914
- Running time: 4 reels
- Country: USA
- Language: Silent..English titles

The Ring and the Man is a lost 1914 silent dramatic film directed by Francis Powers and starring Bruce McRae. It was produced by Famous Players Film Company and released on State Rights basis.

== Cast ==
- Bruce McRae - George Gormly, alias for George fordyce
- Wellington Playter - William Haldane
- Violet Horner - Eleanor Haldane
- Helen Aubrey - Mrs. Jim Martin
- Robert Broderick - Jim Martin
- Albert Andruss - Chief of Police
- Charles Douglass (actor) - The Sheriff
- Albert S. Houston - Fordyce's Secretary
