= My Lady Incog =

1916 film by Sidney Olcott

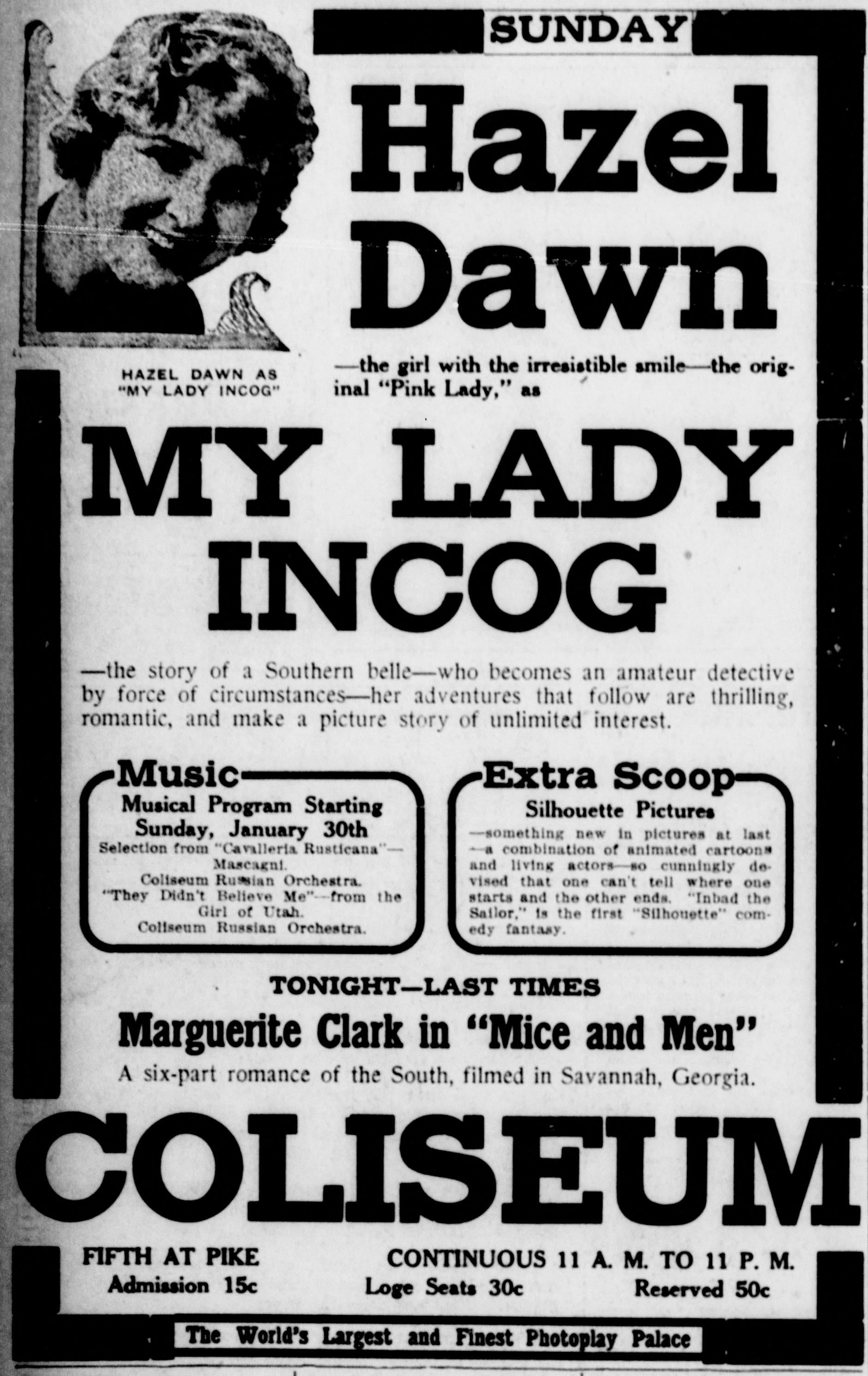
- Newspaper advertisement
- Directed by: Sidney Olcott
- Written by: William Clifford
- Produced by: Daniel Frohman; Famous Players Film Company
- Starring: Hazel Dawn
- Distributed by: Paramount
- Release date: January 17, 1916
- Running time: 5 reels
- Country: United States
- Languages: Silent film (English intertitles)

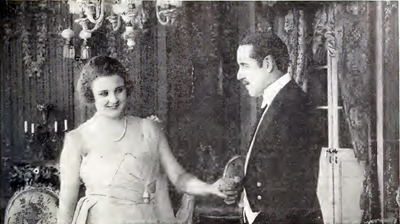
Hazel Dawn (left)

My Lady Incog is a 1916 American silent film produced by Famous Players Film Company and distributed by Paramount. It was directed by Sidney Olcott with Hazel Dawn in the leading role.

== Cast ==
- Hazel Dawn - Nell Carroll
- George Majeroni - René Lidal
- Robert Cain - Teddy De Veaux
- Dora Mills Adams - Mrs. De Veaux
- Franklyn Hanna - Chief of Police
- Frank Wunderlee - Bull Rice

== Production Links ==
The film was shot in Palm Beach, Florida.
