= Lorraine Huling Maynard =

American actress (1897–1971)

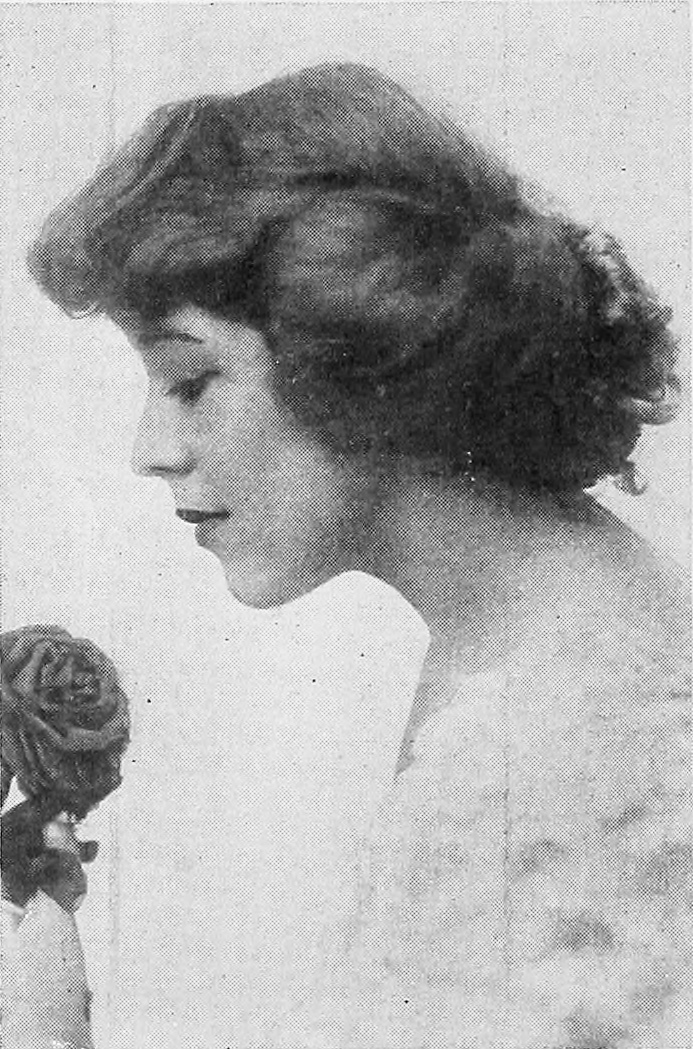
- Huling, c. 1915
- Born: Lorraine Huling; January 19, 1897; Oakesdale, Washington, U.S.
- Died: November 15, 1971 (aged 74); Old Greenwich, Connecticut, U.S.
- Occupations: Actress, author
- Spouse: Richard Field Maynard (1917 - 1964, his death)
- Children: 2

Lorraine Huling Maynard (January 19, 1897 – November 15, 1971) was an American silent film actress and writer.

== Early life ==
Born in Oakesdale, Washington, Maynard was the daughter of Mr and Mrs. C. Floyd Huling, and she grew up in Bennington, Vermont. They divorced when Maynard was five, and her mother worked in Chicago, Illinois, as a nurse and receptionist for Edmund James Doering, who became her lover as well as a father figure for her. Maynard attended Chicago public schools and a convent school for the first few years of her education; her mother later placed her in a variety of boarding schools in the United States and abroad. Maynard spent several summers in Westbrook, Connecticut, with her grandmother, Mary Elizabeth Lyman Simmons, and frequently traveled abroad with her mother and Doering. When Lorraine was 15, Florence's relationship with Doering ended and she married Charles Young, who drank heavily and made advances to Lorraine on at least one occasion.

== Stage and film ==
Encouraged by her mother to go on the stage, Maynard made her Broadway debut in 1913, playing the role of "Doll" in Prunella; her success in that production led to an offer of a contract from Famous Players Film Company. Also on Broadway, she appeared in Help Wanted (1914). She began acting in silent films produced by the Thannhauser Company in New Rochelle, New York, the following year. In 1915, while working as a model in New York City, she met Richard Field Maynard, a portrait painter and Harvard College graduate. A romantic relationship developed between them but was opposed by Richard's parents, who were concerned about the age difference between Richard (born in 1875) and Lorraine, and also about Lorraine's career as an actress. Lorraine's mother also objected to the match, and moved to Hollywood, California, with her daughter. Lorraine appeared in several more films, including King Lear, in which she played Cordelia, and The Fall of a Nation, a response to D.W. Griffith's The Birth of a Nation. (The two films were based on books by the same author, Thomas Dixon, who directed The Fall of a Nation.) Lorraine and Richard corresponded during their separation and married in 1917, with Lorraine retiring from the screen. They had two daughters, Sylvia and Beverly.

== Writing ==
Shortly after their marriage, Lorraine began taking creative writing classes at Columbia University. A number of her stories were published in magazines for children; in both 1929 and 1930, her stories were included in anthologies of "best" children's stories. She also wrote the children's books Twinkle Little Movie Star, which drew on her knowledge of Hollywood and moviemaking, and Dilly Was Different. In the 1930s, Lorraine began therapy with David Seabury and formed a deep attachment to him. She worked with him on his books, transcribing at least one into Braille, and he provided the introduction to her Genius in Chrysalis: Locked Doors on Greatness Within. Lorraine's last book, Bellevue, written with Dr. Laurence Miscall, was published in 1940.

== Death ==
Richard Field Maynard died of heart failure in 1963, and Lorraine passed away in her sleep in her home in Old Greenwich, Connecticut, in 1971.

== Papers ==
Maynard's papers are housed at Harvard Library.

== Selected filmography ==
- The Unwelcome Mrs. Hatch (1914)
- The Straight Road (1914)
- The Dancing Girl (1915)
- Are You a Mason? (1915)
- His Wife (1915)
- The Fall of a Nation (1916)
- King Lear (1916)
