= The Masqueraders (film) =

1915 film by James Kirkwood

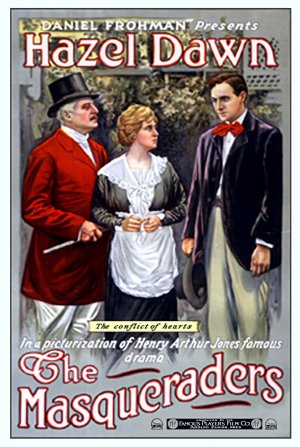
- Theatrical release poster
- Directed by: James Kirkwood, Sr.
- Based on: play The Masqueraders by Henry Arthur Jones(c.1894 London)
- Produced by: Daniel Frohman; Adolph Zukor
- Starring: Hazel Dawn; Elliott Dexter; Frank Losee; Norman Tharp; Ida Darling; Evelyn Farris
- Cinematography: Emmett A. Williams
- Production company: Famous Players Film Company
- Distributed by: Paramount Pictures
- Release date: October 28, 1915
- Running time: 60 minutes
- Country: United States
- Language: English

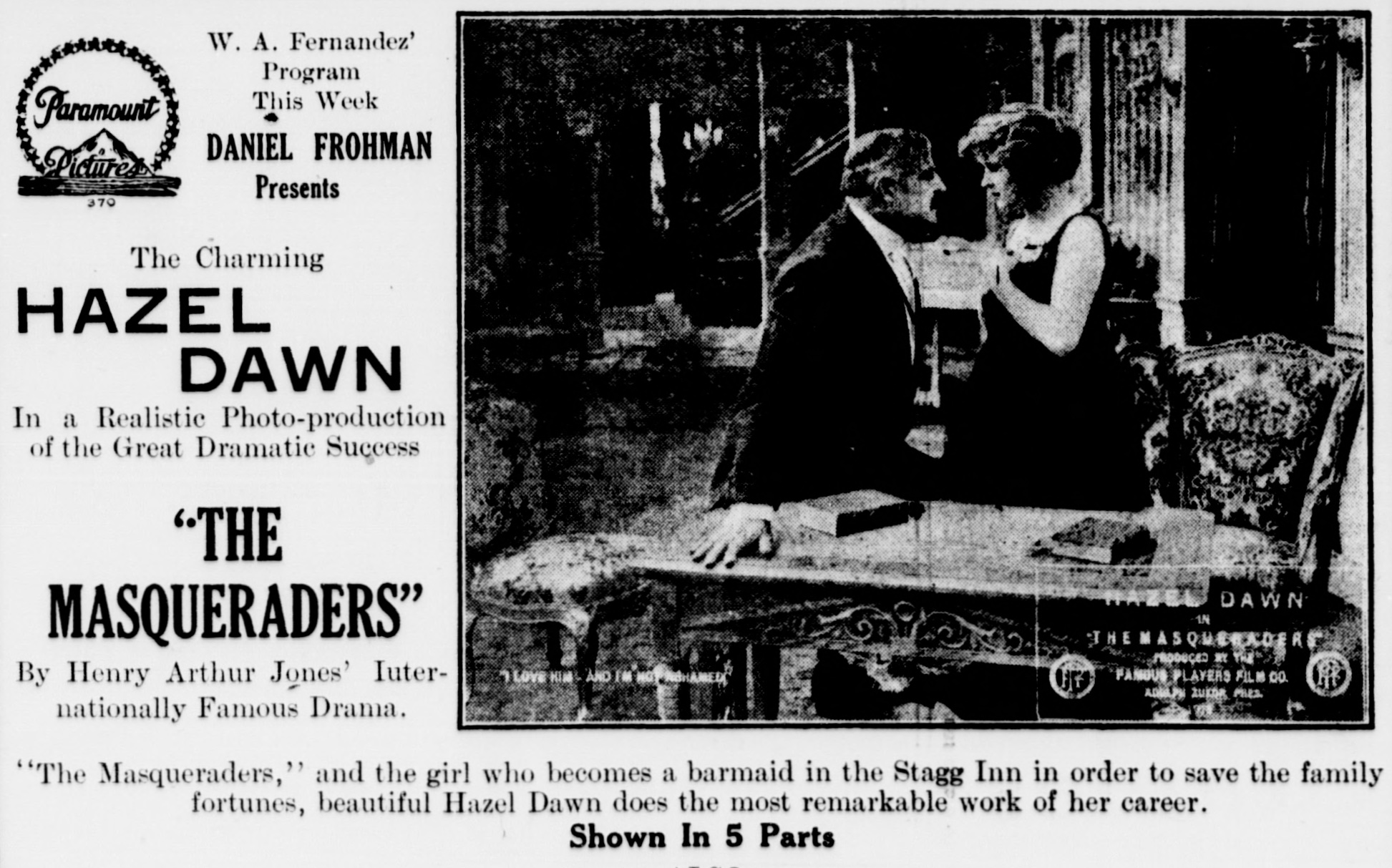
Contemporary newspaper advertisement.

The Masqueraders is a 1915 American drama silent film directed by James Kirkwood, Sr. The film stars Hazel Dawn, Elliott Dexter, Frank Losee, Norman Tharp, Ida Darling and Evelyn Farris. It is an adaptation of the 1894 play by English dramatist Henry Arthur Jones. The film was released on October 28, 1915, by Paramount Pictures.

== Plot ==
High-born but poor Dulcie Larondie is working as a bar maid in the Skagg Inn when she accepts a marriage proposal from the wealthy Sir Brice Skene, rejecting in the process the love of David Remon, an impoverished astronomer. Sir Brice turns out to be a drunk, a gambler and a wife-beater, who loses his fortune four years into the marriage. Remon wins her back in a game of cards with Skene, who is shortly afterwards murdered by a blackmailing acquaintance. This leaves Dulcie free to marry David.

== Cast ==
- Hazel Dawn as Dulcie Larendie
- Elliott Dexter as David Remon
- Frank Losee as Sir Brice Skene
- Norman Tharp as Monte Lushington
- Ida Darling as Lady Crandover
- Evelyn Farris as Clarice
- Nina Lindsey as Helen Lardendie
- Charles Bryant as Eddie Remon
- Russell Bassett as Inn Proprietor
