= The Fatal Card =

1915 film by James Kirkwood

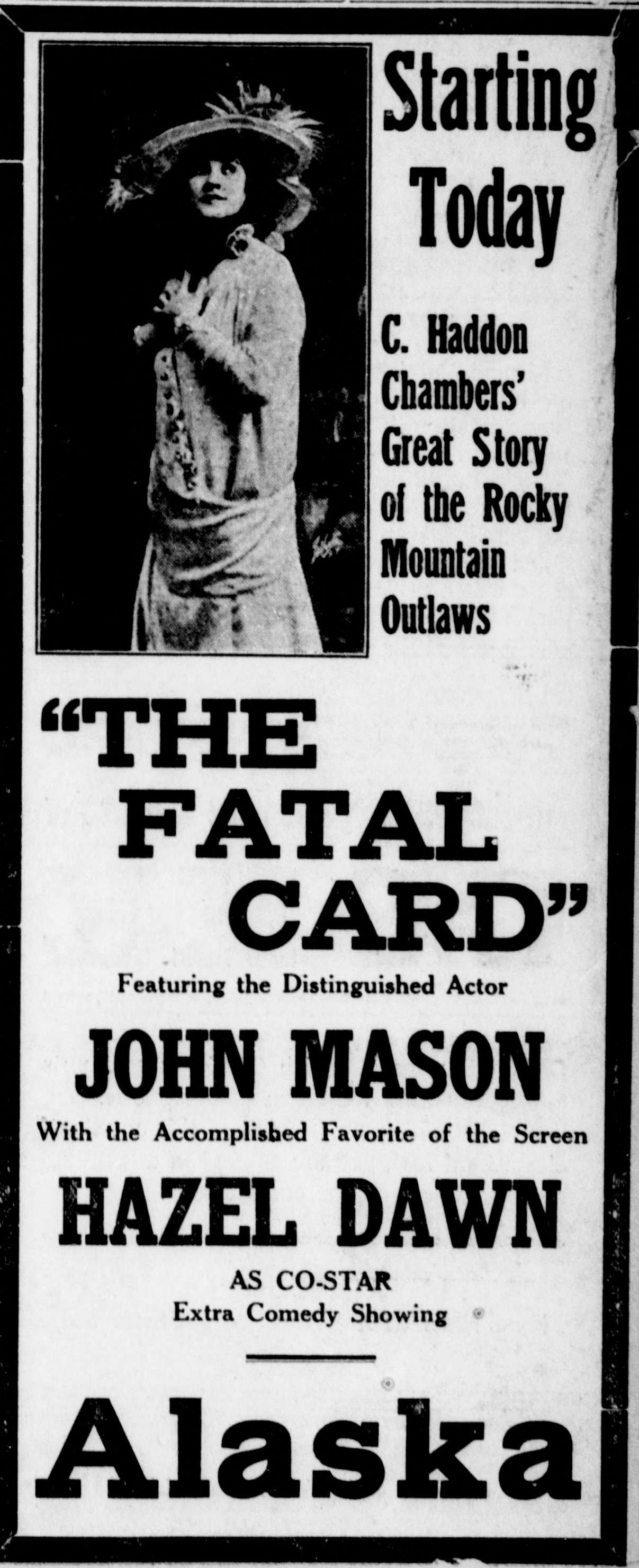
- Newspaper advertisement
- Directed by: James Kirkwood, Sr.
- Screenplay by: Charles Haddon Chambers; B. C. Stephenson
- Produced by: Daniel Frohman
- Starring: John Mason; Hazel Dawn; Russell Bassett; Helen Weir; David Powell; William J. Ferguson
- Production company: Famous Players Film Company
- Distributed by: Paramount Pictures
- Release date: September 30, 1915
- Country: United States
- Language: English

The Fatal Card is a 1915 American drama silent film directed by James Kirkwood, Sr., adapted from the 1884 London play of the same name by Charles Haddon Chambers and B. C. Stephenson. The film stars John Mason, Hazel Dawn, Russell Bassett, Helen Weir, David Powell and William J. Ferguson. The film was released on September 30, 1915, by Paramount Pictures.

== Cast ==
- John B. Mason as George Forrester
- Hazel Dawn as Margaret Marrable
- Russell Bassett as A.K. Austen
- Helen Weir as Cecile
- David Powell as Gerald Austen
- William J. Ferguson as Jim Dixon
