= The Dancing Girl (film) =

1915 film by Allan Dwan

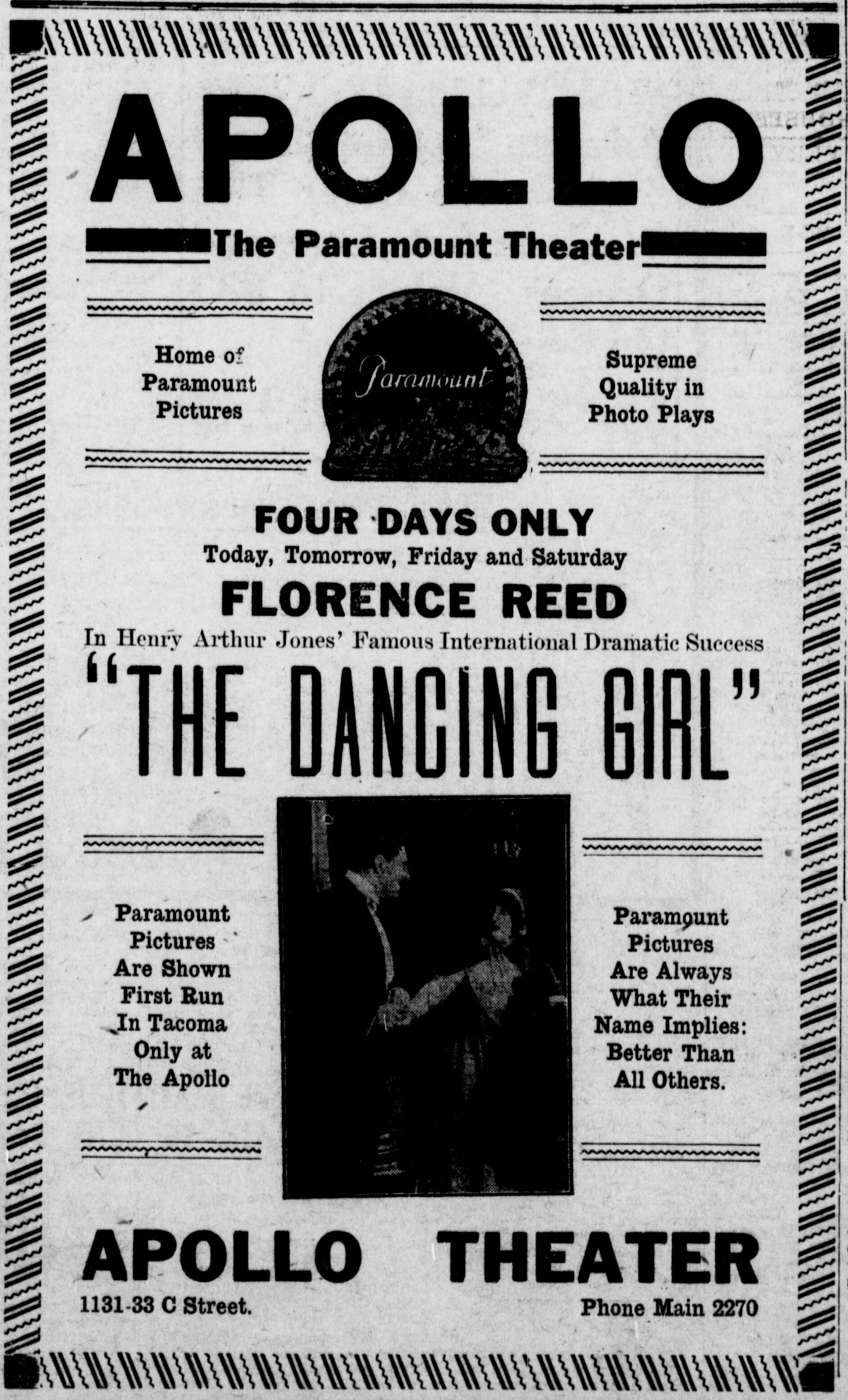
- A newspaper advertisement
- Directed by: Allan Dwan
- Based on: The Dancing Girl by Henry Arthur Jones
- Produced by: Adolph Zukor; Daniel Frohman
- Starring: Florence Reed
- Cinematography: H. Lyman Broening
- Distributed by: Paramount Pictures
- Release date: January 11, 1915
- Running time: 5 reels
- Country: United States
- Language: Silent film (English intertitles)

The Dancing Girl is a lost 1915 silent film drama produced by the Famous Players Film Company and distributed by Paramount Pictures. It is based on the 1891 Broadway play of the same name by Henry Arthur Jones. The film was directed by Allan Dwan and starred stage actress Florence Reed in her film debut. Reed's husband, Malcolm Williams, also appears in the film.

== Cast ==
- Florence Reed - Drusilla Ives
- Fuller Mellish - David Ives
- Lorraine Huling - Faith Ives
- Malcolm Williams - A Quaker
- William Russell - John Christison
- Eugene Ormonde - Duke of Guiseberry
- William Lloyd - Mr. Crake
- Minna Gale - Lady Bawtry
