= Closed Door =

Closed Door may refer to:

- Closed Door (1962 film), an Argentine film
- Closed Door (1939 film), an Argentine drama film

== See also ==
- Closed Doors, a 1921 American silent drama film
