= Fuller Mellish =

English-born American actor (1865–1936)

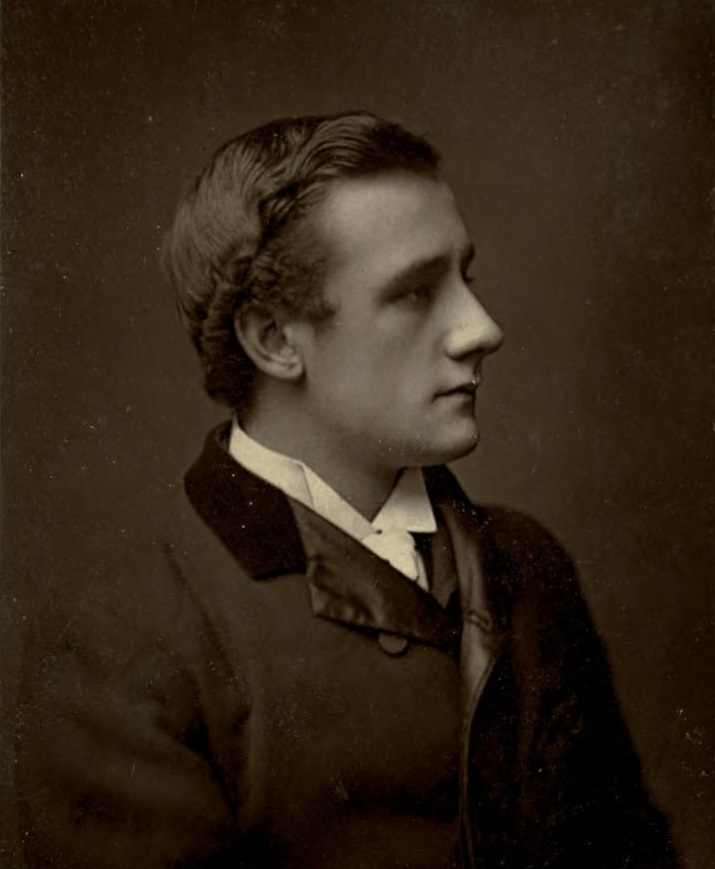
- Mellish in 1887
- Born: Harold Arthur Fuller; January 3, 1865; London, England
- Died: December 7, 1936 (aged 71); New York City, New York, U.S.
- Resting place: Kensico Cemetery, Valhalla, New York, U.S.
- Occupation: actor
- Years active: 1881-1935
- Spouse: Eliza Archdekin Buckley
- Children: Fuller Mellish Jr. Vera Fuller Mellish

Fuller Mellish (January 3, 1865 – December 7, 1936), born Harold Arthur Fuller, was an English born American stage and screen actor. He was the father of Fuller Mellish Jr. (of Applause fame) and Vera Fuller Mellish. His parents were Charles Perry Fuller and Rose Leclercq. Mellish began his stage career in 1881 and performed in his last play in 1935.

== Filmography ==
- The Dancing Girl (1915)
- The Eternal City (1915)
- Four Feathers (1915)
- Gambier's Advocate (1915)
- A Royal Family (1915)
- Esmerelda (1915)
- The Tortured Heart (1916)
- Mayblossom (1917)
- The Power of Decision (1917)
- The Trail of the Shadow (1917)
- The Unforeseen (1917)
- The Inner Voice (1920)
- The Silent Barrier (1920)
- Diane of Star Hollow (1921)
- The Scarab Ring (1921)
- The Land of Hope (1921)
- The Single Track (1921)
- Sinner or Saint (1923)
- Two Shall Be Born (1924)
- Crime Without Passion (1934)
