= The Port of Missing Men =

1914 film

- Directed by: Francis Powers
- Based on: the novel The Port of Missing Men by Meredith Nicholson c.1907
- Produced by: Adolph Zukor
- Starring: Arnold Daly
- Distributed by: State Rights
- Release date: May 1, 1914
- Running time: 5 reels
- Country: USA
- Language: Silent..English titles

The Port of Missing Men is a lost 1914 silent film drama directed by Francis Powers and starring Arnold Daly. It is based on a novel of the same name by Meredith Nicholson.

== Cast ==
- Arnold Daly - John Armitage
- Marguerite Skirvin - Shirley Claiborne
- Edward MacKay - Frederick Augustus
- Frederick Bock - Emperor Charles Louis
- Augustus Balfour - Archduke Karl
- Minna Gale Haynes - Archduchess
- Mortimer Martine - Ferdinand von Stroebel
- Arthur Hale - Francis
- David Wall - Jules Chauvenel
- Wallace Scott - Richard Claiborne
- Fred Webber - Judge Claiborne

Preservation status

Although a few surviving prints from the film exist, no footage from the original negatives for The Port of Missing Men has been located by film collectors or the Library of Congress, thus rendering it a lost film.

In September 2025, Kevin Brown Jr., a digital silent film collector, and centrist political activist from Massachusetts, begin working on a project to restore some lost films by making a slideshow with surviving pictures and time and event cards. He intends to make the port of missing men part of that project in the near future.
