= Minna Gale =

American actress (1865–1944)

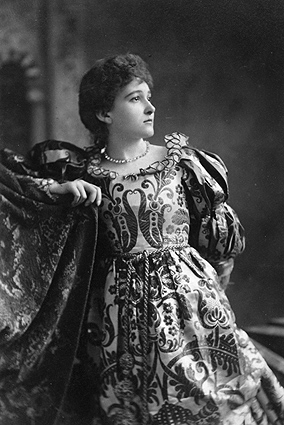
- Minna Gale as Desdemona in Othello (circa 1887)
- Born: September 26, 1865; Elizabeth, New Jersey, U.S.
- Died: March 4, 1944 (aged 78); Riverside, Connecticut, U.S.
- Other names: Minna K. Gale; Minna Gale Haynes
- Occupation: Actress
- Years active: 1885–1922
- Employer: Lawrence Barrett's theatre company
- Known for: Shakespearean stage roles

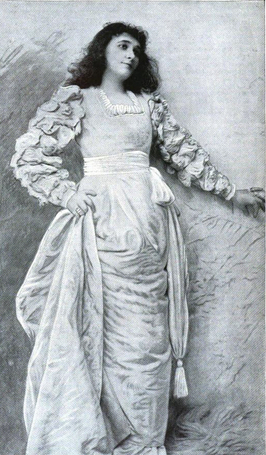
Minna K. Gale, from an 1892 publication; from a photograph by Sarony.

Minna Gale (September 26, 1865 – March 4, 1944), also credited as Minna K. Gale and Minna Gale Haynes, was an American actress.

== Early life ==
Minna Kathalina Gale was born in Elizabeth, New Jersey, the daughter of James and Cornelia K. Gale; after her father's death, she lived in Europe and studied music and theatre in Paris and Frankfurt. "She speaks two languages besides English sufficiently well to play in either of them," noted one reviewer in 1886.

== Career ==
Minna Gale was known for Shakespearean roles in her early career. In 1885, at age nineteen, Gale was cast as Queen Gertrude, in Lawrence Barrett's production of Hamlet (Barrett, playing her son in the title role, was 47 years old). She stayed with Barrett's company for six seasons, sometimes as a rival to Helena Modjeska. Later, she played Ophelia to Edwin Booth's last performance as Hamlet. Her beauty was often mentioned in reviews. "If there is a young lady in this land who wishes to look when mad, she must assiduously cultivate the Minna Gale pout," remarked one theatre writer in 1892. She formed her own company after Barrett's death, and briefly retired from the stage in 1893, after her marriage.

In 1903 Gale-Haynes returned to acting as Rosalind in a production of As You Like It, given as a benefit for Vassar College on Shakespeare's birthday. Broadway appearances by Gale included roles in The Triumph of Love (1904), The White Sister (1909, written by Francis Marion Crawford and starring Viola Allen), A Celebrated Case (1915), The Pride of Race (1916), A Tailor-Made Man (1917), The Outrageous Mrs. Palmer (1920), Tarzan of the Apes (1921), Golden Days (1921), and The Rubicon (1922).

Gale appeared in several silent films, including The Prisoner of Zenda (1913), Clothes (1914), The Port of Missing Men (1914), The Unwelcome Mrs. Hatch (1914), The Dancing Girl (1915), and A Fool There Was (1915, with Theda Bara).

== Personal life ==
Minna K. Gale married insurance executive Archibald Cushman Haynes in 1892, as his second wife; she was widowed when he died in 1912. She died at home in Riverside, Connecticut in 1944, aged 74 years, survived by an adopted daughter, Dorothy Haynes Vollmer.
