= Mayblossom (film) =

1917 film

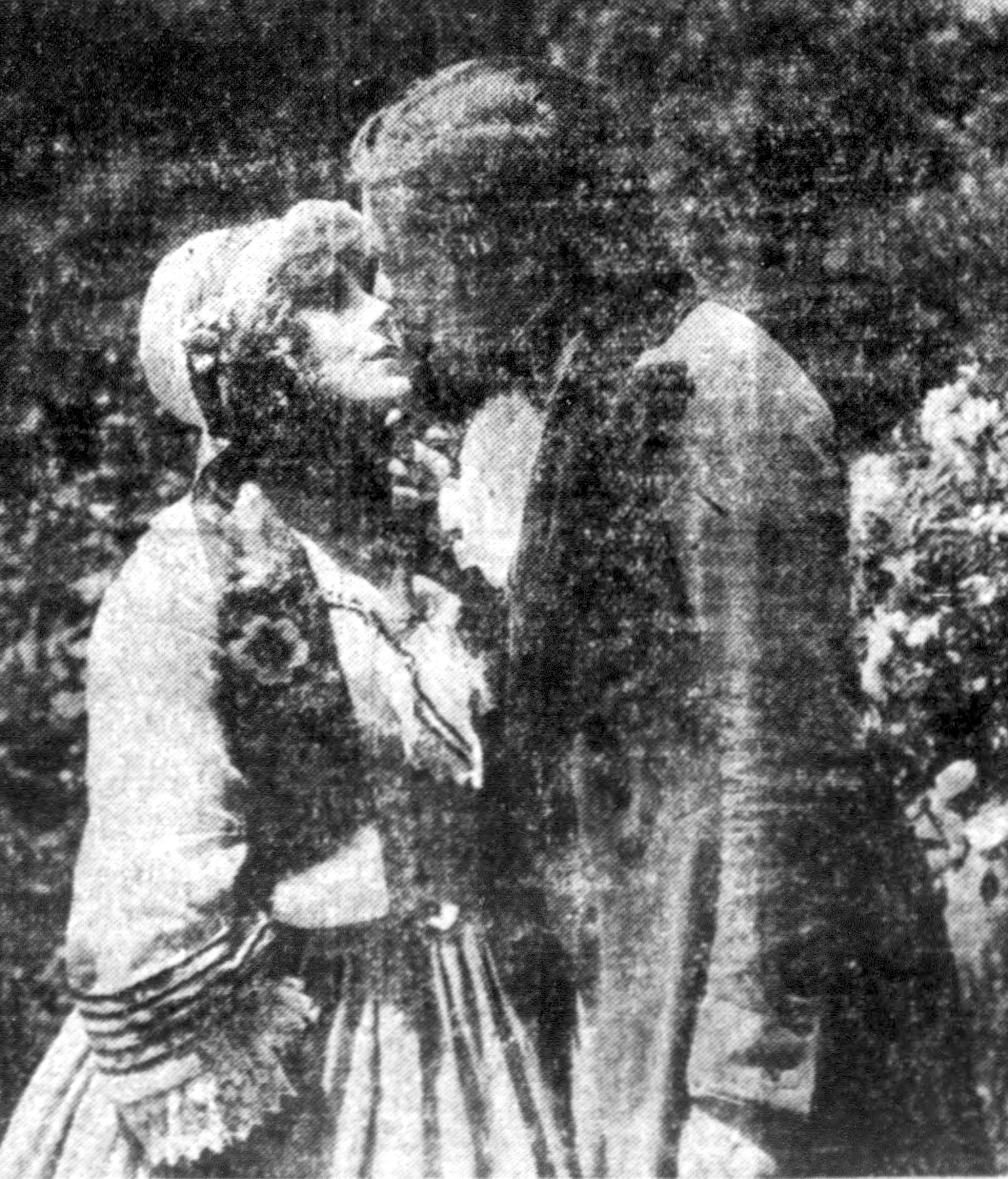
- Scene from the film.
- Directed by: Edward José
- Written by: Anthony P. Kelly (story)
- Starring: Pearl White
- Cinematography: Ben Struckman
- Production company: Astra Film Company
- Distributed by: Pathé Exchange
- Release date: April 8, 1917
- Running time: 5 reels
- Country: USA
- Language: Silent (English intertitles)

Mayblossom is an extant 1917 silent feature film directed by Edward José and starring Pearl White.

== Cast ==
- Pearl White - Annabel
- Hal Forde - Warner Richmond
- Fuller Mellish - Warner's grandfather
