= The Green Swamp =

1916 film by Scott Sidney

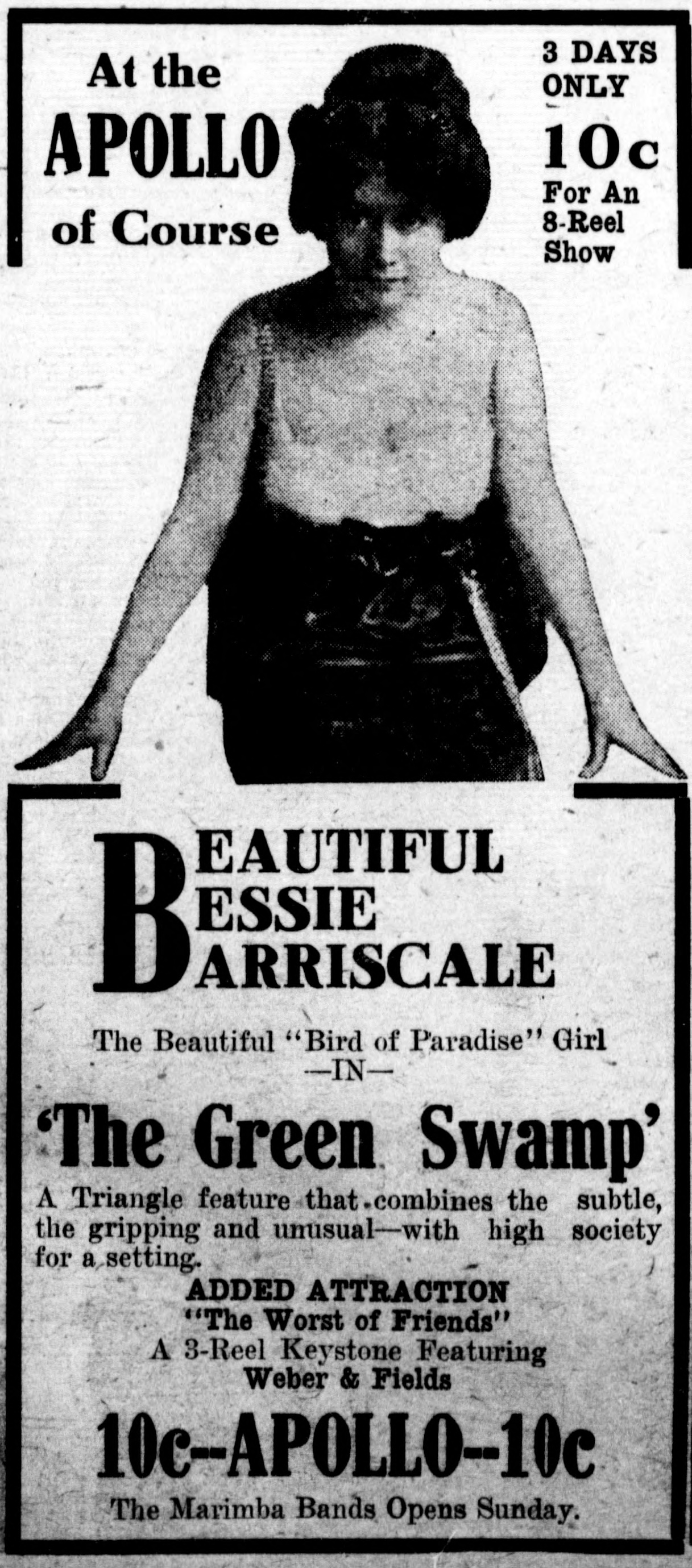
- Newspaper advertisement
- Directed by: Scott Sidney
- Written by: C. Gardner Sullivan
- Produced by: Kay-Bee Pictures; New York Motion Pictures
- Starring: Bessie Barriscale; Bruce McRae
- Cinematography: John Stumar
- Distributed by: Triangle Film Corporation
- Release date: January 30, 1916
- Running time: 50 minutes
- Country: United States
- Languages: Silent; English intertitles

The Green Swamp is a 1916 silent drama starring Bessie Barriscale and written by C. Gardner Sullivan.

== Plot summary ==
The film centers on Magery Allison (played by Bessie Barriscale) and her husband, Dr. Ward Allison (played by Bruce McRae). Jealous over her husband's friendship with his female patients, Mrs. Allison fails to deliver a message from a patient that nearly results in the death of the patient's child. Mrs. Allison pleads for forgiveness. On learning that she is pregnant, Dr. Allison does forgive her. However, the cycle of jealousy repeats itself.

== Cast ==
- Bessie Barriscale - Margery Allison
- Bruce McRae - Dr. Ward Allison
- J. Barney Sherry - Dr. Jim Hendon
- Milton Ross - Detective Bryan
- Lola May - Edna
- Louise Brownell - Miss Miller

== Preservation ==
Only the first reel of The Green Swamp is known to survive, the film is otherwise considered lost. It is held by the UCLA Film & Television Archive.
