= Bruce McRae =

American actor (1867–1927)

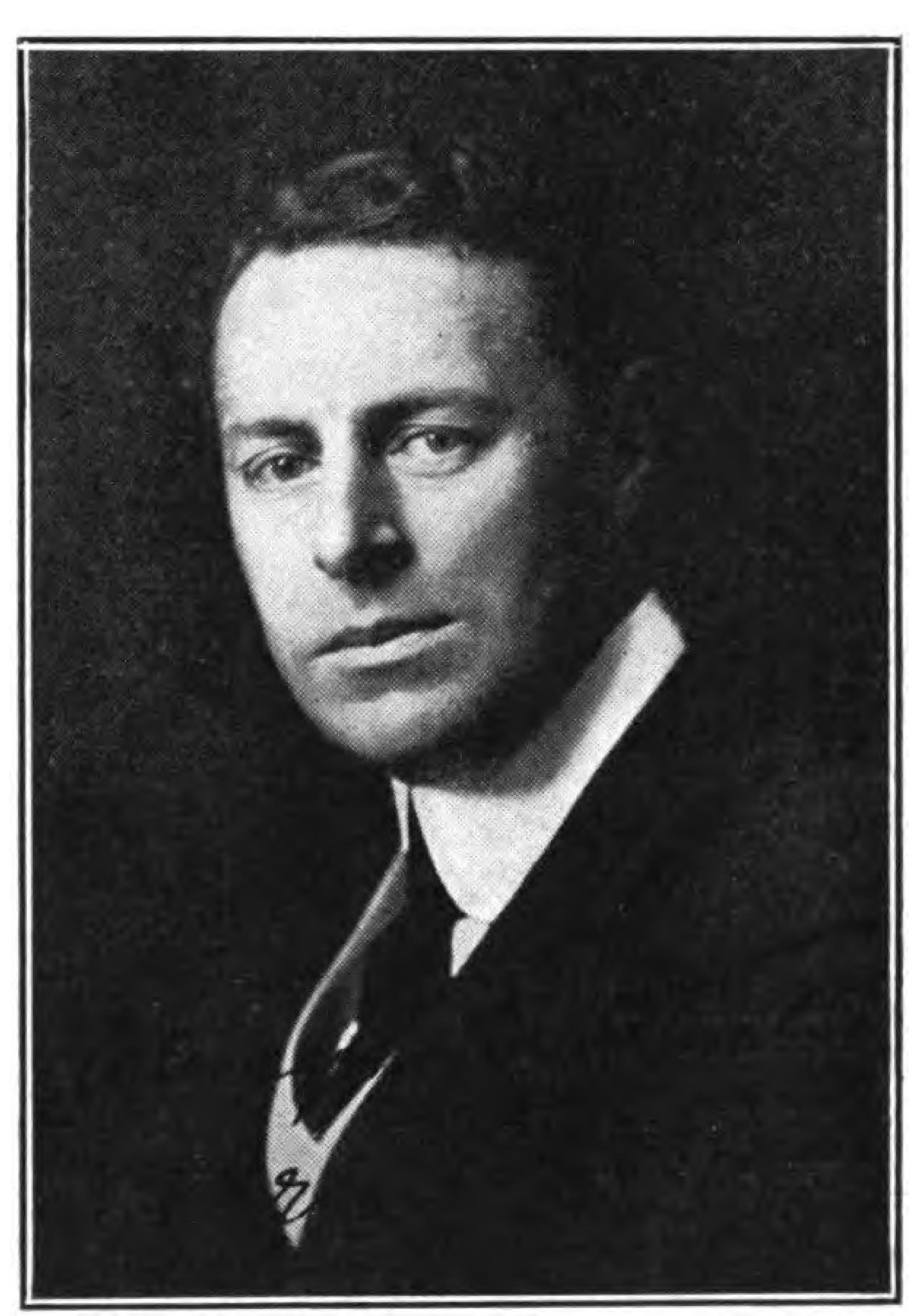
- McRae c. 1909
- Born: January 15, 1867; India
- Died: May 7, 1927 (aged 60); City Island, Bronx, New York
- Occupations: Stage, film actor
- Years active: 1908 – 1922
- Children: 2

Bruce McRae (January 15, 1867 – May 7, 1927) was an American stage and early silent film actor. He was the nephew of actor Sir Charles Wyndham.

== Early years ==
Born in India in 1867 of Scots and English parents, McRae went to New Zealand at the age of sixteen where he worked in cattle ranching. Later, adopting the profession of surveyor, he moved to Australia for five years.

In 1890, he moved to the United States where he became manager of a cattle ranch in Laramie, Wyoming.

== Acting career ==
A year after arriving in the United States McRae made his first appearance on stage supporting Elsie de Wolfe and Forbes Robertson in Thermidor at Proctor's 23rd Street Theatre. The two years following this he appeared in Aristocracy by Bronson Howard, who was married to his aunt, and then spent one season in Shenandoah by the same playwright.

The season of 1895–1896, he played in The Fatal Card by C. Haddon Chambers and the following year supported Olga Nethersole, playing the leading juvenile roles in Camille, Denise by Alexander Dumas fils, Frou-Frou by Henri Meilhac, The Wife of Scarli by Giuseppe Giacosa and The Daughter of France, after which came two years as leading man with Herbert Kelcey and Effie Shannon in A Coat of Many Colors and Clyde Fitch's The Moth and the Flame.

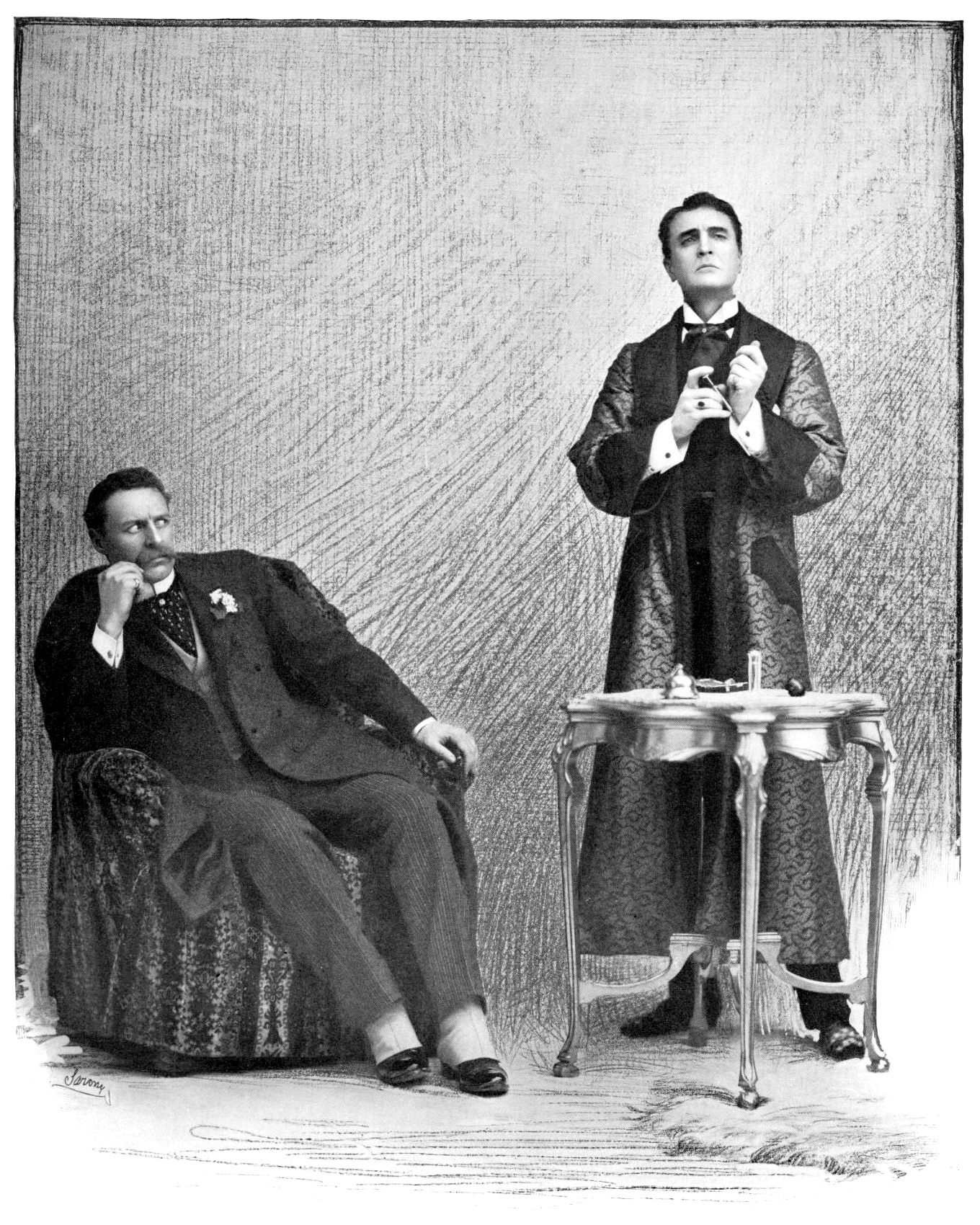
Holmes (William Gillette) and his hypodermic, with Dr. Watson (Bruce McRae, left), in the 1899 Broadway production of Sherlock Holmes

He was the first actor to play Dr. Watson to William Gillette's Sherlock Holmes, followed by two seasons as principal support to Julia Marlowe, playing Captain Trumbull in Barbara Frietchie and originating Charles Brandon in When Knighthood was in Flower.

For several years, 1903-1908 he worked as leading man to the young Ethel Barrymore, appearing with her in Carrots, A Country Mouse by Arthur Law, Cousin Kate by Hubert Henry Davies, Sunday by Thomas Raceward, A Doll's House, Alice Sit-by-the-Fire by J. M. Barrie, Captain Jinks by Clyde Fitch, The Silver Box by John Galsworthy and His Excellency the Governor by Robert Marshall. During this time he also participated in a number of special productions, such as the Miller-Anglin revival of Camille, the matinée of Paul Bertons's Yvette, The Embarrassment of Riches by Louis K. Anspacher at Wallack's and as leading man of the Bellows Stock Company at Elitch Gardens, Denver, for the sumner of 1906.

In the summer of 1907, he went to Chicago with Genesee of the Hills by Marah Ellis Ryan, supporting Edwin Arden. In the fall of that year, he left Ethel Barrymore and appeared first in The Step-sister by Charles Klein and then was engaged by Harrison Grey Fiske to support his wife, Minnie Maddern, in Ibsen's Rosmersholm.

In 1908, he toured the Pacific coast with The Thief by Henri Bernstein, playing the role originally played by Kyrle Bellew.

The season of 1908–09, he rejoined Barrymore's company, playing Paradine Fouldes in Lady Frederick by W. Somerset Maugham. He also appeared with the likes of Douglas Fairbanks and William Garwood in 1908.

McRae was among the summer stock cast at Elitch Theatre for five seasons—1904, 1905, 1911, 1912, and 1914. In 1911 he had just completed a run with Blanche Bates in Nobody's Widow in New York's Hudson Theater when he returned to Elitch's for another summer. In a review of McRae's performance in that summer's An American Widow, a Rocky Mountain News drama critic wrote: "Mr. McRae is perhaps not at his best this week, except in his love scenes. As a lover he is always convincing." McRae's love for Elitch Gardens, and especially for his friend Mary Elitch Long, was clear when Mary's leading man for the summer of 1914 was unable to appear at the last minute, so she contacted McRae. "I wired Mr. McRae a very urgent plea to come to my rescue. He was a prime favorite in Denver and I knew him to be broadminded enough to waive formalities. I knew he would help me out if it were possible. His answering telegram proved the man. My message was received the day before he expected to sail for a much needed vacation in Europe. I received his answer at once: 'Of course I will come. There is no other spot on earth that would lure me from my vacation in Europe. I consider it a privilege to play at the Gardens because I love the place, and all actors feel as I do.'"

After making his reputation acting in various Broadway plays, he moved into film in 1914 starring in about ten films until his retirement in 1922.

== Personal life ==
McRae had two children. His son, Bruce McRae Jr., married famed illustrator/cartoonist Nell Brinkley.

On May 7, 1927, McRae died of a heart attack while in his home on City Island, Bronx.

== Filmography ==
- The Ring and the Man (1914) as George Gormly, alias of George Fordyce
- Via Wireless (1915) as Lieutenant Sommers
- The Chain Invisible (1916) as James Wadsworth, aka The Invisible Chain
- The Green Swamp (1916) as Dr. Ward Allison
- Hazel Kirke (1916) as Squire Rodney
- Beatrice Fairfax
  - Episode 7: "A Name for the Baby" (1916)
  - Episode 10: "Playball" (1916) as The Bookie
- A Star Over Night (1919)
- The World's a Stage (1922) as John Brand
