= Devotion (1921 film) =

1921 film

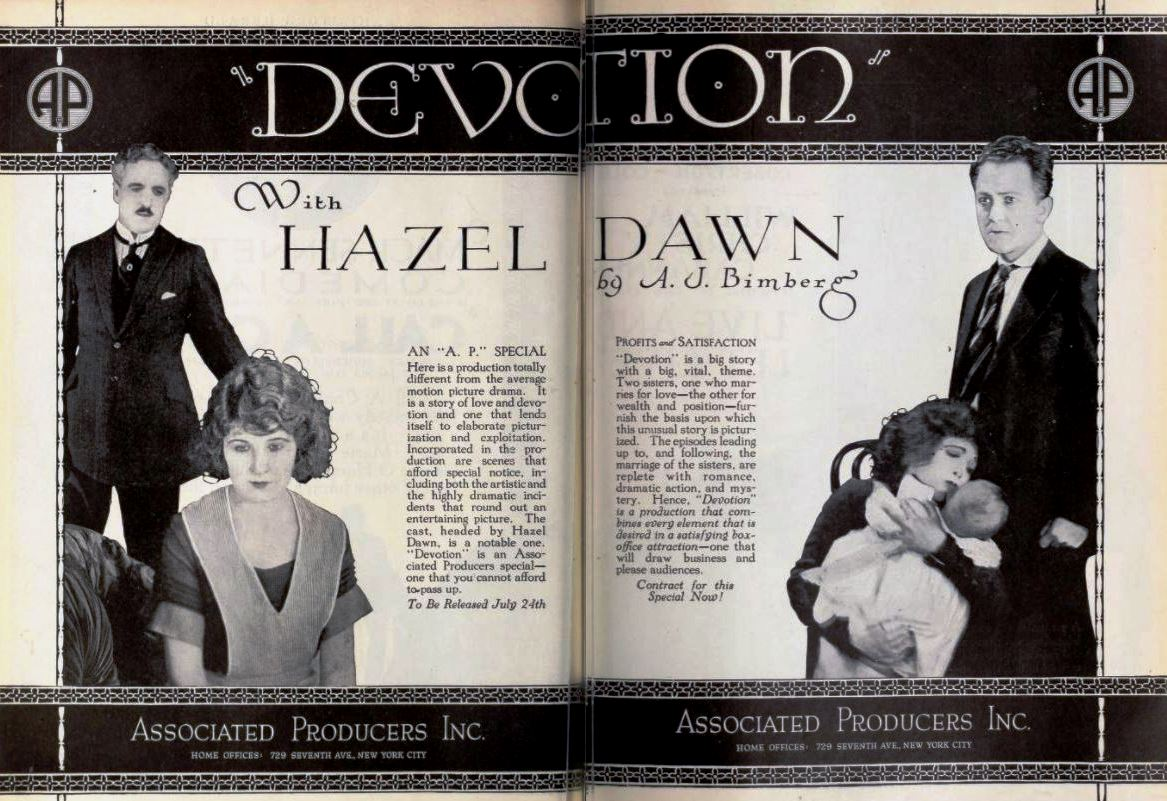
- Directed by: Burton George
- Written by: A.J. Bimberg; Eve Unsell
- Starring: Hazel Dawn; Elmo Lincoln; Violet Palmer
- Cinematography: Ollie Leach
- Edited by: Eve Unsell
- Production company: Associated Producers
- Distributed by: Associated Producers
- Release date: July 24, 1921
- Running time: 60 minutes
- Country: United States
- Languages: Silent; English intertitles

Devotion is a 1921 American silent drama film directed by Burton George and starring Hazel Dawn, Elmo Lincoln and Violet Palmer.

== Cast ==
- Hazel Dawn as Ruth Wayne
- Elmo Lincoln as Robert Trent
- Violet Palmer as Marian Wayne
- Renita Randolph as Lucy Marsh
- Bradley Barker as Stephen Bond
- Henry G. Sell as James Marsh
- Wedgwood Nowell as Teddy Grandin

== Bibliography ==
- Munden, Kenneth White. The American Film Institute Catalog of Motion Pictures Produced in the United States, Part 1. University of California Press, 1997.
