= Esmeralda (1915 film) =

1915 film by James Kirkwood

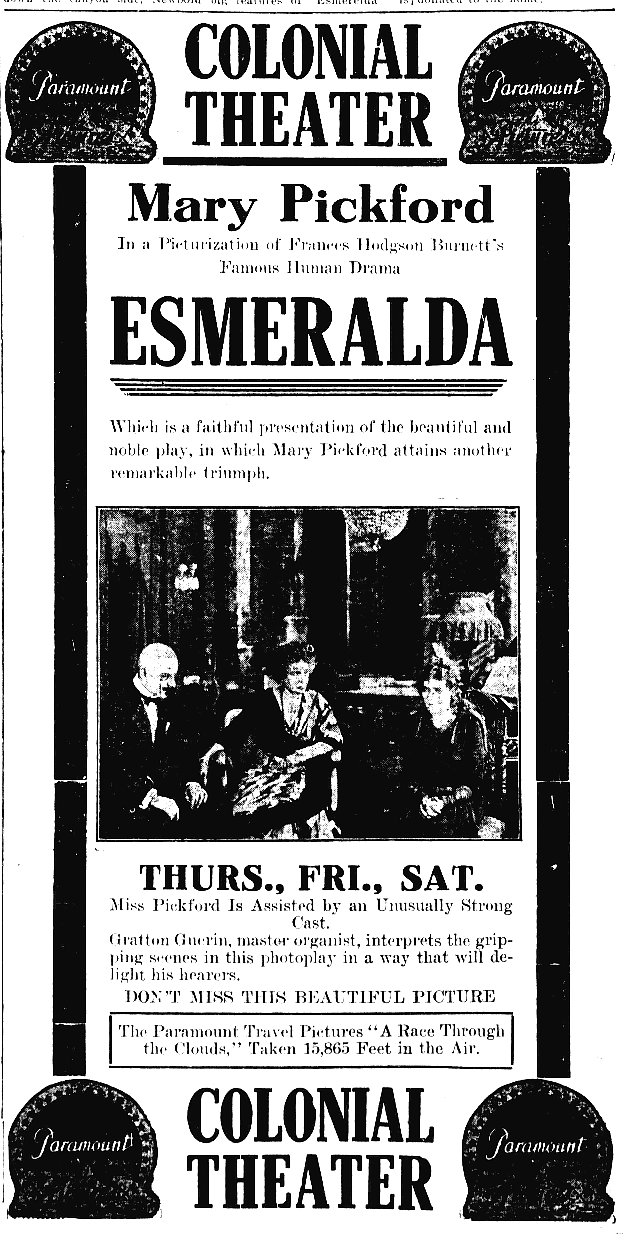
- Newspaper ad
- Directed by: James Kirkwood
- Written by: Frances Hodgson Burnett
- Based on: Esmeralda by Frances Hodgson Burnett
- Produced by: Adolph Zukor; Daniel Frohman
- Cinematography: Emmett A. Williams
- Distributed by: Paramount Pictures
- Release date: September 6, 1915
- Running time: 4-5 reels
- Country: United States
- Languages: Silent film (English intertitles)

Esmeralda is a 1915 silent film starring Mary Pickford, directed by James Kirkwood, and produced by Adolph Zukor and stage impresario Daniel Frohman.

As with the previous Pickford vehicles -- Caprice, Mistress Nell and The Dawn of a Tomorrow -- Esmeralda is based on a short story and stage play Esmeralda written by Frances Hodgson Burnett and William Gillette and produced in the 1880s. The play was acted by Annie Russell and later Viola Allen both teenagers at the time, who later became well known adult theater actresses.

== Cast ==
- Mary Pickford as Esmeralda Rogers
- Ida Waterman as Esmeralda's Mother
- Fuller Mellish as Esmeralda's Father
- Arthur Hoops as Count de Montessin
- William Buckley as William Estabrook
- Charles Waldron as David Hardy

== Plot ==
The story begins on the farm and swings around to the big city. From the simple country girl "Esmeralda" becomes a veteran society leader. One of the big features of "Esmeralda" is the interrupted wedding ceremony in which Little Mary refuses to marry the count. It is a real Pickford scene"

== Preservation status ==
This film is now considered a lost film.

== See also ==
- List of lost films
