= George Foster Platt =

American stage actor (1866–1928)

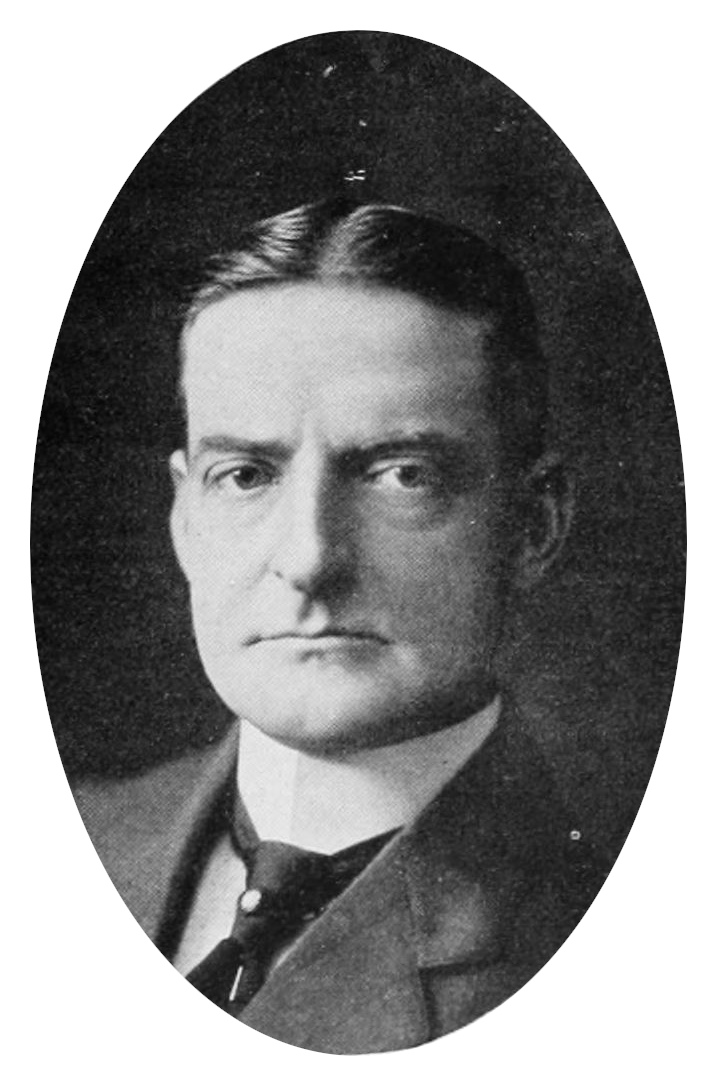
- Born: July 27, 1866; Petersburg, Virginia, U.S.
- Died: November 16, 1928 (aged 62)
- Occupations: Actor; director

George Foster Platt (July 27, 1866 – November 16, 1928) was an American stage actor as well as a director of stage and filmed shows. He was part of Thanhouser's short-lived Jacksonville, Florida, production unit.

Platt was born in Petersburg, Virginia. In April 1892, Platt married actress Beatrice Tait in Philadelphia.

He started his career working as an assistant to Winthrop Ames at the Little Theatre. He directed the Modern Players troupe at the Pabst Theater in Milwaukee in 1917 drawing a positive review from Sheldon Cheney.

Woman's Politics, a comedy in three acts, was copyrighted in his name in 1899. He directed a version of The Affairs of Anatol in 1912.

He worked for Thanhouser. He survived the auto crash that killed Clinton H. Stagg May 5, 1916.

He directed the 1918 Broadway musical comedy The Squab Farm about the film industry featuring three film directors in the cast.

A collection of his papers is part of the Shubert archives in New York.

== Filmography ==
- The Angel in the Mask (1915)
- A Maker of Guns (1915)
- Movie Fans (1915)
- In a Japanese Garden (1915)
- His Wife (1915)
- Inspiration (1915) as director, starring Audrey Munson
- What Doris Did (1916)
- The Five Faults of Flo (1916)
- The Net (1916)
- Deliverance (1919) about Helen Keller
