= Margaret Romaine =

American operatic soprano (1888–1984)

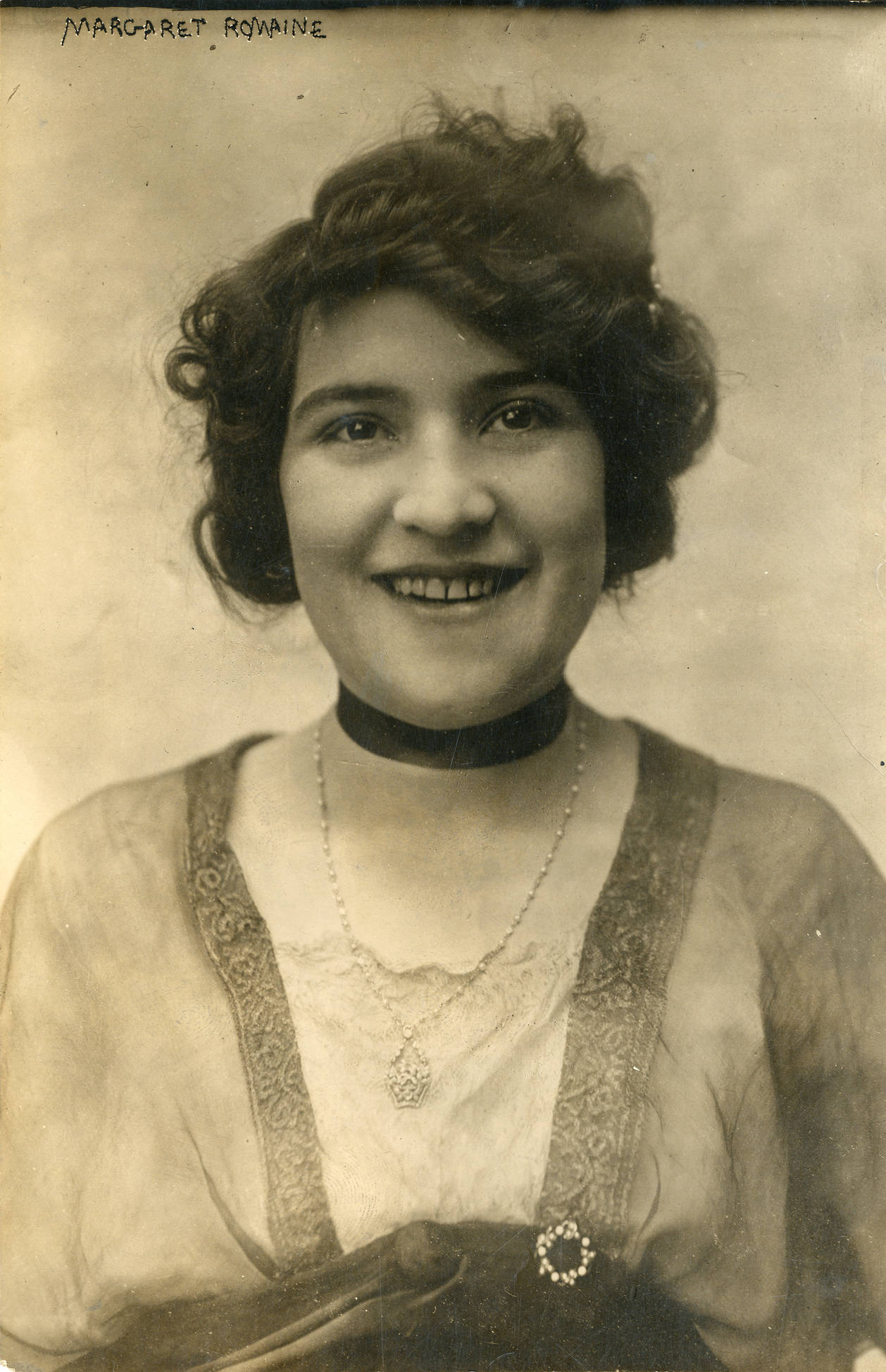
- Margaret Romaine, from a 1914 photograph
- Born: Margaret Elizabeth Tout; September 23, 1888; Ogden, Utah, U.S.
- Died: June 30, 1984 (age 95); Los Angeles, California, U.S.
- Occupation: Operatic soprano
- Relatives: Hazel Dawn (sister)

Margaret Romaine (September 23, 1888 – June 30, 1984) was an American singer, born Margaret Elizabeth Tout. She was a concert soprano and a member of the Metropolitan Opera Company.

== Early life and education ==
Romaine was born in Ogden, Utah, the daughter of Edwin Fulford Tout and Sarah Emmett Tout. Her father was from Wales. Her family was Mormon, and known for their musical talents; her sisters included singer Nannie Tout and actresses Eleanor Dawn and Hazel Dawn. She studied with Australian singer Nellie Rowe in London, and with New York vocal teacher Eleanor McLellan.

== Career ==
Romaine was a soprano who toured as a concert singer and was a member of the Metropolitan Opera Company. She also performed at the Paris Opéra-Comique. She starred in musical comedies on Broadway, including The Midnight Girl (1914) and The Soldier Boy (1916). She made about fifty recordings for Victor and Columbia labels, between 1914 and 1924. She wore gowns by designer Rose Tafel. She appeared in a joint recital with baritone Pasquale Amato in 1921. In 1928, she appeared in vaudeville programs. She sang on radio broadcasts in the 1930s. She retired by 1942, and lived in Beverly Hills.

== Personal life ==
Romaine married George Emmett Browning Jr. in 1911, in England. They had a daughter, Margaret (called Peggy), and a son, Emmett. Her daughter Margaret died in 1976. She died in 1984, at the age of 95, in Los Angeles.
