= The Unwelcome Mrs. Hatch =

1914 film by Allan Dwan

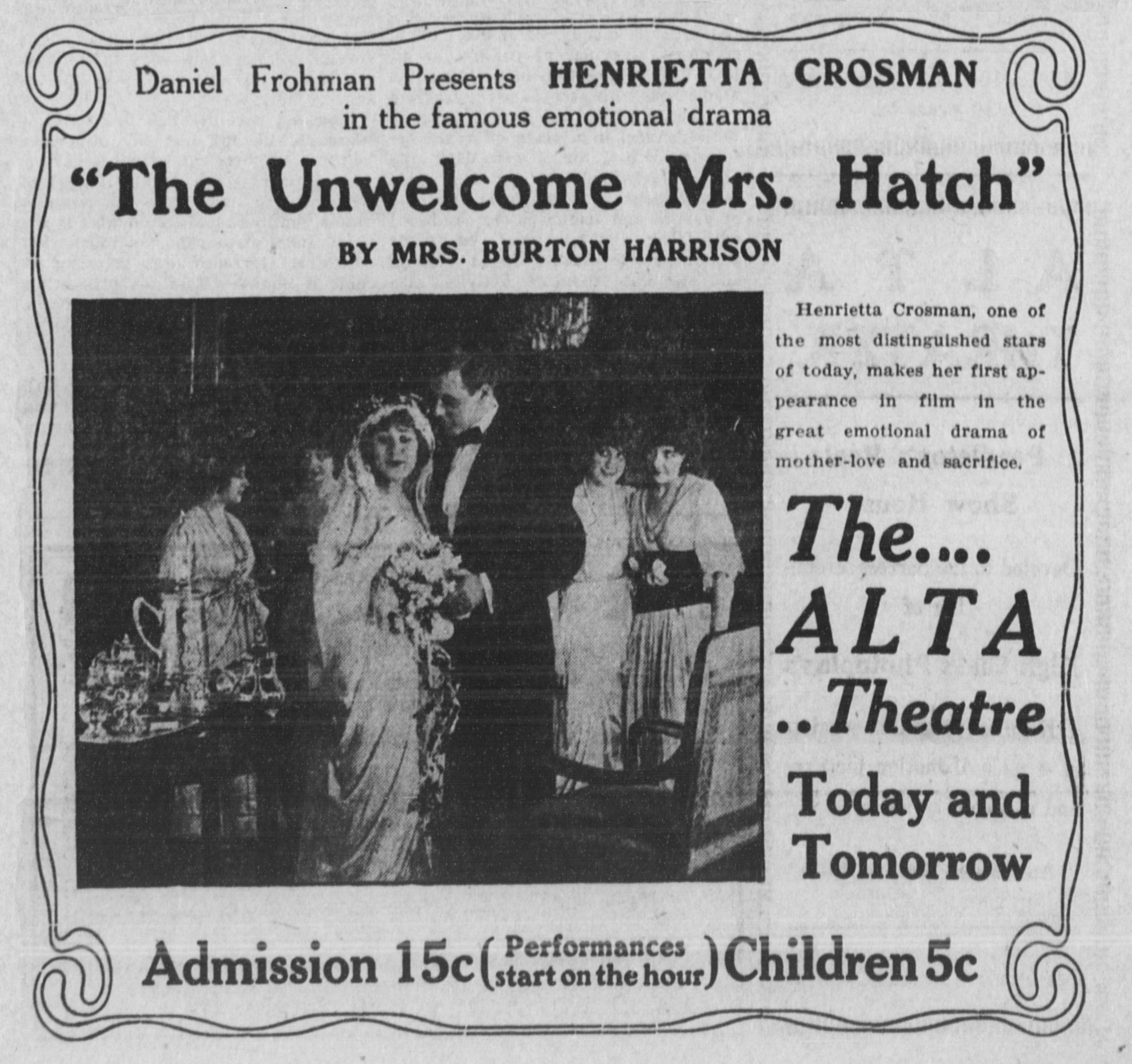
- Newspaper advertisement
- Directed by: Allan Dwan
- Screenplay by: Allan Dwan
- Based on: The Unwelcome Mrs. Hatch by Mrs. Burton Harrison
- Produced by: Daniel Frohman
- Starring: Henrietta Crosman; Walter Craven; Lorraine Huling; Minna Gale; Harold Lockwood
- Production company: Famous Players Film Company
- Distributed by: Paramount Pictures
- Release date: September 10, 1914
- Running time: 4 reels
- Country: United States
- Language: Silent (English intertitles)

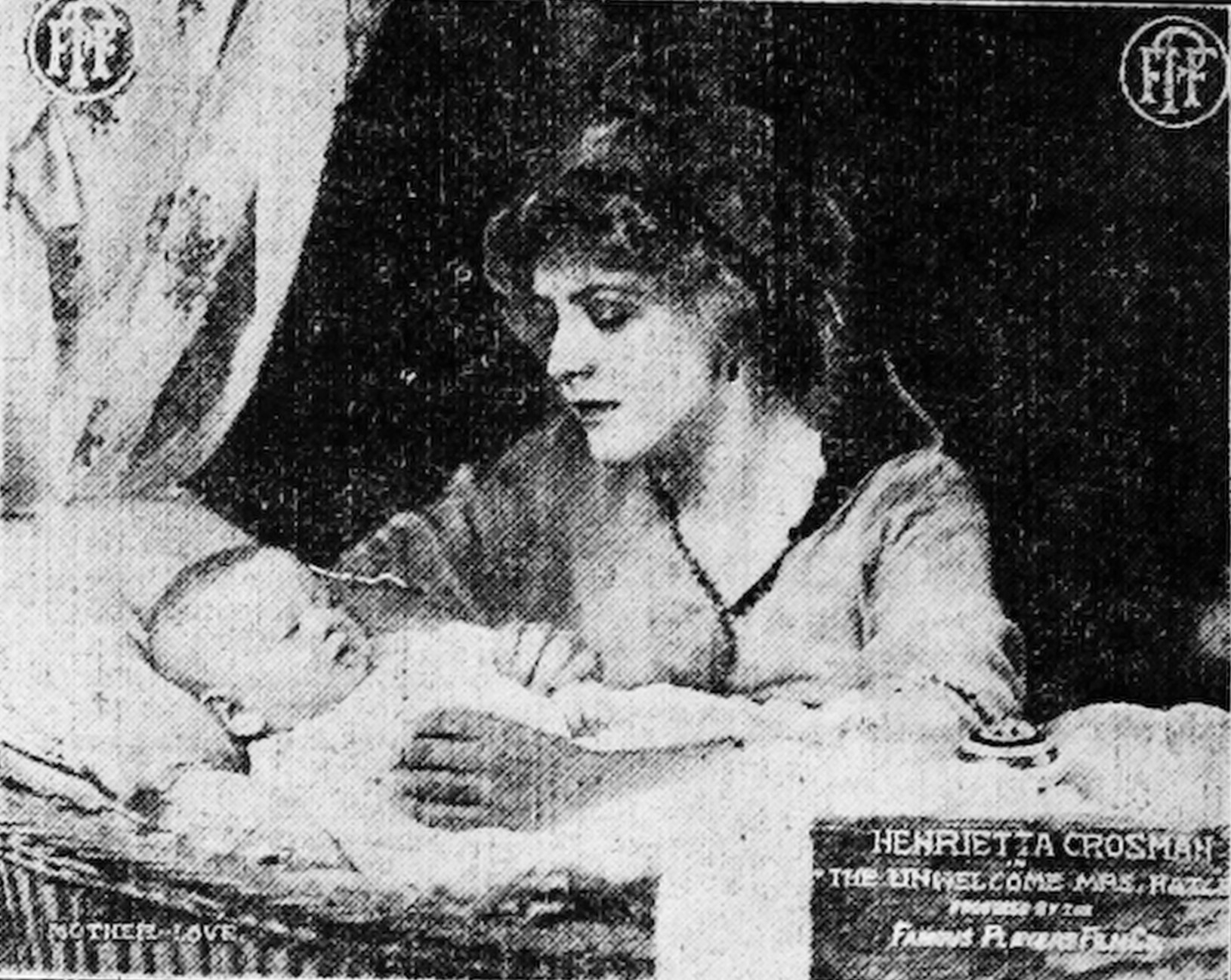
Scene from the film.

The Unwelcome Mrs. Hatch is a 1914 American drama film directed by Allan Dwan, written by Allan Dwan based on the play of the same name by Mrs. Burton Harrison, and starring Henrietta Crosman, Walter Craven, Lorraine Huling, Minna Gale, and Harold Lockwood. It was released on September 10, 1914, by Paramount Pictures.

== Cast ==
- Henrietta Crosman as Mrs. Hatch
- Walter Craven as Richard Lorimer
- Lorraine Huling as Gladys Lorimer
- Minna Gale as Second Mrs. Lorimer
- Harold Lockwood as Jack Adrian
- Paul Trevor as Harry Brown
- Gertrude Norman as Old Agnes
