= Francis Powers (actor) =

American actor, playwright, screenwriter, and director (1865-1940)

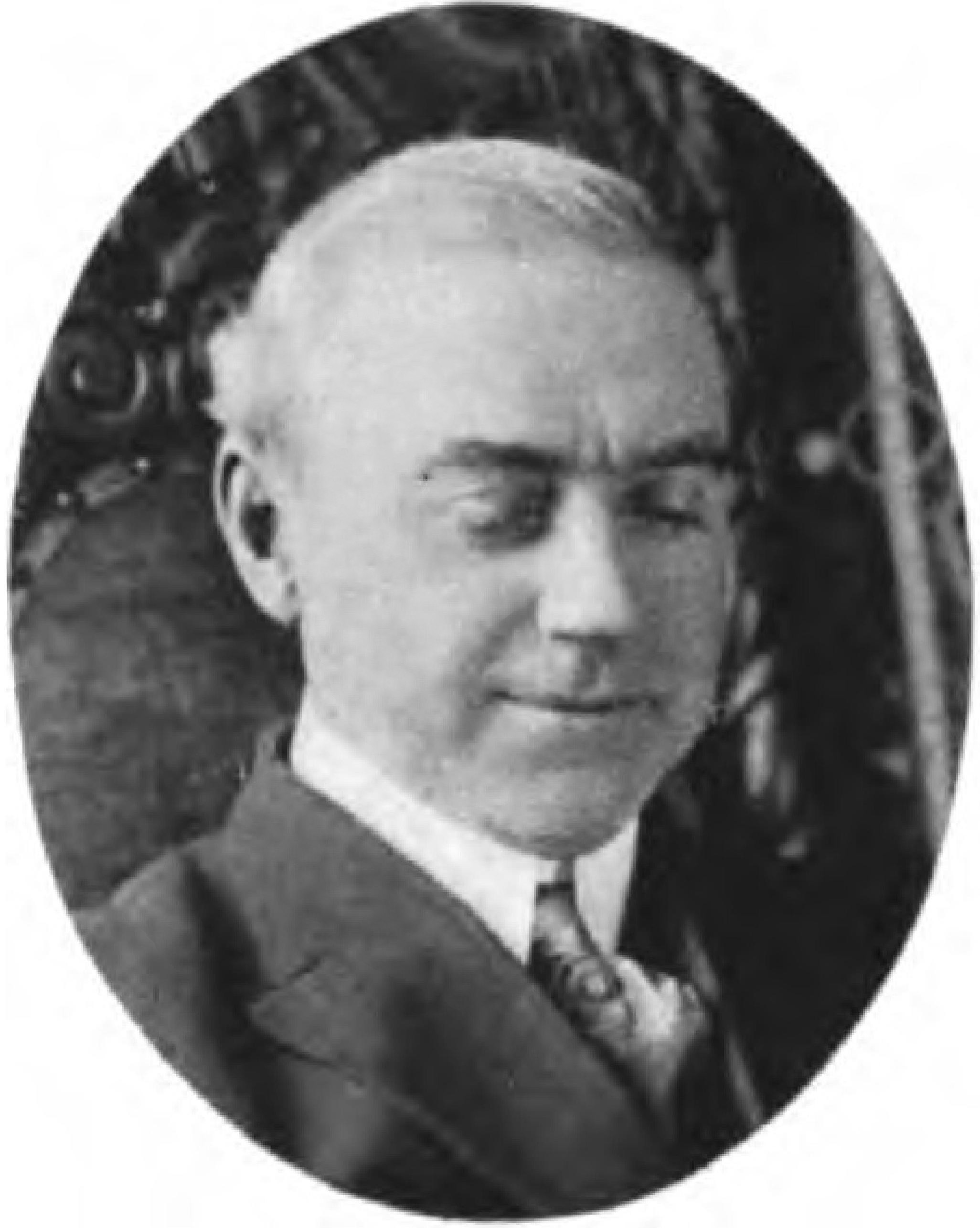
- Born: June 4, 1865; Virginia, U.S.
- Died: May 10, 1940 (aged 74); Santa Monica, California, U.S.
- Occupations: Actor; playwright; screenwriter; film director
- Years active: 1897–1939

Francis Jackson Powers (June 4, 1865 – May 10, 1940) was an American actor, playwright, screenwriter, and director. His play The First Born was staged on Broadway at the Manhattan Theatre by David Belasco in 1897; a work in which he also starred in the lead part of Chan Wang. The play told the story of Chinese life in San Francisco, and was a hit in New York. His other Broadway credits included performances in Richard Carvel (1901, Empire Theatre), Hon. John Grigsby (1902, Manhattan Theatre), Robert Emmet (1902, Haverly's 14th Street Theatre), and Adrea (1905, Belasco Theatre). In addition to working as a stage actor he also performed in silent films.

Powers died on May 10, 1940, in Santa Monica, California at the home of his daughter. He was the brother of newspaper cartoonist T. E. Powers.

== Selected filmography ==
=== Actor ===
- Out of the Dust (1920, as Sgt. Burns)
- The White Rider (1920, as Major Drake)
- The Love Trap (1923, as Judge Lyndon)
- Rouged Lips (1923, as Mr. MacPherson)
- Playing It Wild (1923, as Old Man Web)
- The Dramatic Life of Abraham Lincoln (1924, as Richard J. Oglesby)
- The Iron Horse (1924, as Sergeant Slattery)
- The Fighting Heart (1925, as John Anderson)
- Lightnin' (1925, uncredited)
- Thank You (1925, as Gossiping Man)
- The Show (1927, uncredited)

=== Director ===
- Clothes (1914)
- The Port of Missing Men (1914)
- The Ring and the Man (1914)
- The Little Gray Lady (1914)
- The Arrow Maiden (1915, also screenwriter)
- As in the Days of Old (1915)
- The Bride of the Sea (1915)
- Father (1915, also screenwriter)
- The Lady of Duty (1915, also screenwriter)
- Old Mother Grey (1915)
- One Who Serves (1915)
- Good and Evil (1916, also screenwriter)
- Sea Mates (1916, also screenwriter)

=== Screenwriter ===
- The Arrow Maiden (1915, also director)
- The Crest of Van Endheim (1915)
- The Ever-Living Isles (1915)
- Father (1915, also director)
- The Lady of Duty (1915, also director)
- A Daughter of the Nile (1916)
- Good and Evil (1916, also director)
- The Lady from the Sea (1916)
- Sea Mates (1916, also director)
- Shadows of Conscience (1921)
- The First Born (1921)
