= Closed Doors =

1921 film

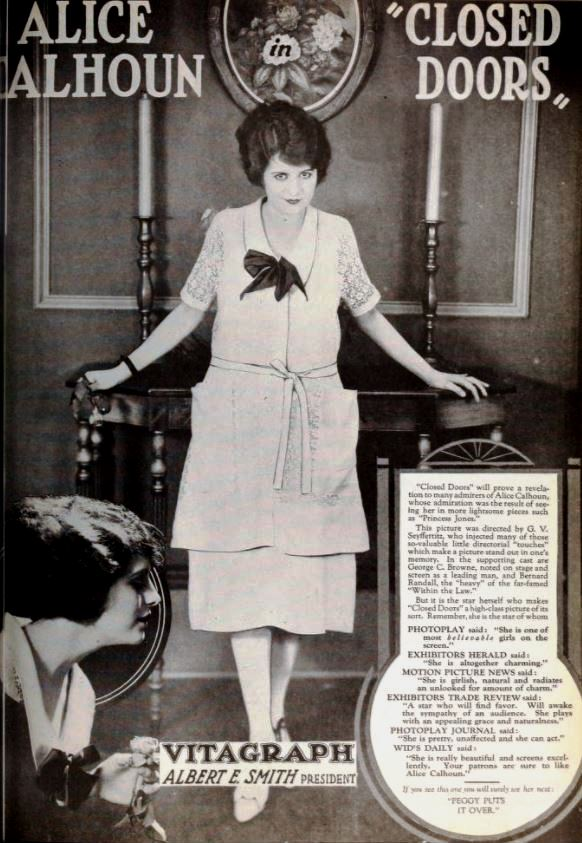
- Directed by: Gustav von Seyffertitz
- Written by: William B. Courtney; Harry Dittmar
- Starring: Alice Calhoun; Harry C. Browne
- Cinematography: Arthur Ross
- Production company: Vitagraph Company of America
- Distributed by: Vitagraph Company of America
- Release date: July 1921
- Running time: 50 minutes
- Country: United States
- Languages: Silent; English intertitles

Closed Doors is a 1921 American silent drama film directed by Gustav von Seyffertitz and starring Alice Calhoun and Harry C. Browne.

== Cast ==
- Alice Calhoun as Dorothy Brainerd
- Harry C. Browne as Jim Ranson
- Bernard Randall as Rex Gordon
- A.J. Herbert as Muffler Mike
- Betty Burwell as Jane
- Charles Brook as Dan Syrles

== Bibliography ==
- Connelly, Robert B. The Silents: Silent Feature Films, 1910-36, Volume 40, Issue 2. December Press, 1998.
- Munden, Kenneth White. The American Film Institute Catalog of Motion Pictures Produced in the United States, Part 1. University of California Press, 1997.
