= His Wife (1915 film) =

1915 silent film

- Directed by: George Foster Platt
- Written by: Bertha M. Clay (novel)
- Produced by: Edwin Thanhouser
- Starring: Geraldine O'Brien; Holmes Herbert; Lorraine Huling
- Cinematography: Larry Williams
- Production company: Thanhouser Film Corporation
- Distributed by: Mutual Film
- Release date: October 28, 1915
- Running time: 50 minutes
- Country: United States
- Languages: Silent; English intertitles

His Wife is a 1915 American silent drama film directed by George Foster Platt and starring Geraldine O'Brien, Holmes Herbert and Lorraine Huling.

== Cast ==
- Geraldine O'Brien as Nora Dennys
- Holmes Herbert as John Dennys
- Lorraine Huling as Edith Danvers
- Inda Palmer as Aunt Nancy
- Theodore von Eltz as Harry Dennys

== Bibliography ==
- Robert B. Connelly. The Silents: Silent Feature Films, 1910-36, Volume 40, Issue 2. December Press, 1998.
