= Hazel Dawn =

American actress (1890–1988)

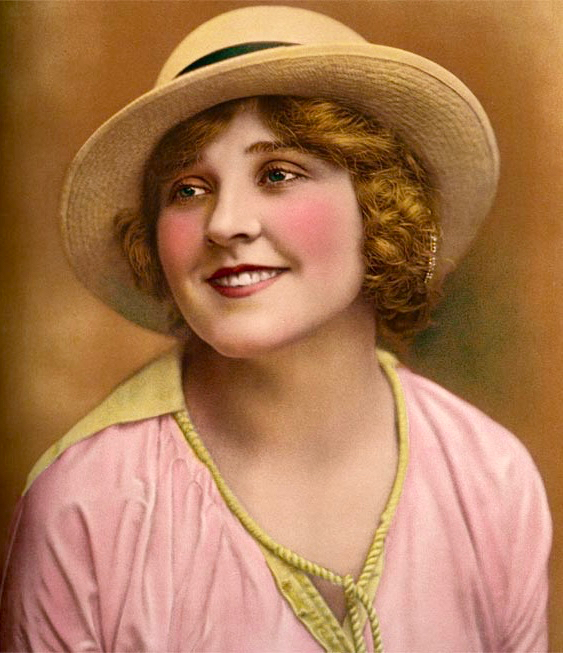
- Dawn in 1914
- Born: Henrietta Hazel Tout; March 23, 1890; Ogden, Utah
- Died: August 23, 1988 (aged 98); New York City, New York
- Other name: The Pink Lady
- Years active: 1914–1931
- Spouse: Charles Edward Gruwell (m. 1927; died 1941)
- Children: 2
- Relatives: Margaret Romaine (sister)

Hazel Dawn (born Henrietta Hazel Tout; March 23, 1890 – August 28, 1988) was an American stage, film and television actress, and violinist. She was born to a Mormon family in Utah, and studied music in Europe where her father was a missionary. Dawn rose to fame as the title character in Ivan Caryll's The Pink Lady, which opened in 1911 on Broadway and ran for over 300 performances; it earned Dawn the eponymous nickname. She performed extensively on Broadway and began work in film in 1914, appearing in a total of 13 feature films. Dawn died at age 98 in New York City.

== Early life ==
Dawn was born Henrietta Hazel Tout in Ogden, Utah, in 1890. She went to Wales with her family at the age of eight when her father served as a Mormon missionary there. Dawn studied violin and voice in London, Paris, and Munich. She especially was impressed by the attentiveness of teachers she studied under in Paris. Her sister, Nancy Tout, was an opera singer who sang with the Opéra-Comique in Paris.

== Career ==
=== Stage work ===
Dawn met producer Ivan Caryll at a party in London. Caryll suggested the stage name Hazel Dawn, considering Tout to be "impossible". She met composer Paul Rubens, who offered her a part in Dear Little Denmark at the Prince of Wales Theatre (1909), where she made her theatrical debut. She then starred in The Balkan Princess in 1910 as Olga. She achieved great success with her performance in Caryll's Edwardian musical comedy The Pink Lady (1911). The show ran for a total of 316 performances on Broadway and then toured, making Dawn famous. In the production, she introduced "My Beautiful Lady", which she sang and played on her violin. Subsequently, she was known as "The Pink Lady", and the Pink Lady cocktail may have been named for her.

She starred in the operetta The Debutante (1914) at the National Theater in Washington, D.C. under the management of John C. Fisher. Harry B. Smith wrote the book and play adaptation. The setting of the operetta is in London and Paris, and Dawn played a young American girl pursued by a nobleman who desires her fortune. In December, she appeared in The Debutante at the Knickerbocker Theatre in Washington.

Other shows in which Dawn appeared include The Great Temptations, Avery Hopwood's Getting Gertie's Garter and The Demi-Virgin, as well as vaudeville productions. Her last appearance on Broadway was in Wonder Boy (1931).

She emerged from retirement in June 1948 to appear on stage with her daughter Hazel Dawn Jr. in a revival of Ruth Gordon’s play Years Ago at the Casino Theatre in Newport, Rhode Island.

=== Transition to film ===
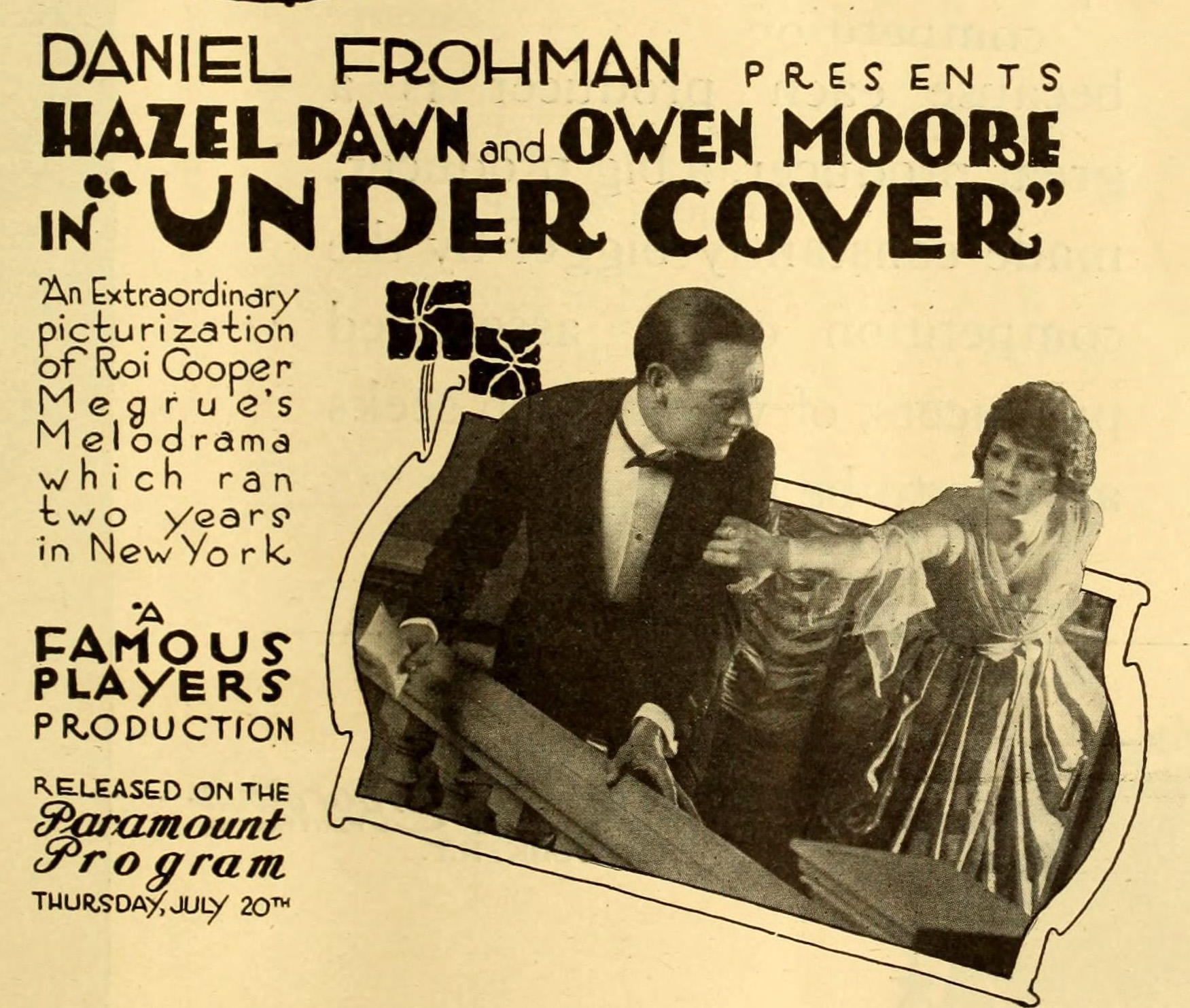
Under Cover (1916)

Dawn made her screen debut as Kate Shipley in One of Our Girls (1914), beginning her association with the Famous Players–Lasky film compan. Dawn followed with roles in Niobe (1915), Clarissa (1915), The Masqueraders (1915) and The Fatal Card (1915).

Dawn played a detective in the comedic/romantic mystery film My Lady Incog (1916). In The Lone Wolf (1917), she acted with Bert Lytell in an adaptation of a novel by Louis Joseph Vance. Her last film credit was Devotion (1921).

== Personal life ==
Dawn married Charles Edward Gruwell, a mining engineer from Montana, in 1927. Gruwell was purported to be one of the richest men in the Western U.S. The couple had two children, Dawn Gruwell and Charles E. Gruwell. Her daughter pursued a career as an actor and singer on film, television and Broadway under the name of Hazel Dawn Jr. Following Gruwell's death in 1941, Dawn worked in the casting department of J. Walter Thompson advertising agency. She retired in 1963.

Dawn was once the mascot of both the U.S. Military Academy and the U.S. Naval Academy at one of their annual football games.

== Death ==
Dawn died at the home of her daughter in Manhattan in 1988 at age 98.

== Legacy ==
Actress Ruth Gordon cited Dawn as her inspiration for becoming an actress. A 14-year-old Adele Astaire saw Dawn's performance in The Pink Lady and idolized her, thinking her to be "the most lovely, graceful creature" she had seen.

In 1953, Dawn was portrayed by Kay Williams in the film The Actress.

== Filmography ==
Year	Title	Role	Notes
1914	One of Our Girls	Kate Shipley	
1915	Niobe	Niobe	
1915	Gambier's Advocate	Clarissa	
1915	The Heart of Jennifer	Jennifer Hale	
1915	The Fatal Card	Margaret Marrable	
1915	The Masqueraders	Dulcie Larendie	
1916	My Lady Incog.	Nell Carroll	
1916	The Saleslady	Helen	
1916	The Feud Girl	Nell Haddon, 'The Spitfire'	
1916	Under Cover	Ethel Cartwright	
1917	The Lone Wolf	Lucy Shannon	
1917	National Red Cross Pageant		
1921	Devotion	Ruth Wayne	

== Works cited ==
- Hunter, James Michael (2013). Mormons and Popular Culture: The Global Influence of an American Phenomenon. Literature, Art, Media, Tourism, and Sports. Vol. II. ABC-CLIO. ISBN 978-0-313-39167-5.
- Slide, Anthony (2012). The Encyclopedia of Vaudeville. Univ. Press of Mississippi. ISBN 978-1-617-03250-9.
