= Maude Odell =

American actress

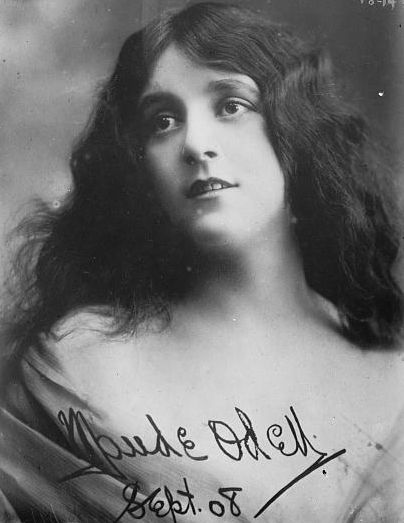
- Born: Maude Odell; November 10, 1870; Beaufort, South Carolina
- Died: February 27, 1937 (aged 66); New York City, New York
- Occupation: Actress
- Years active: 1898–1937

Maude Odell (also spelled Maude O'Dell and sometimes known as Tillie Doremus or Maude Odell Doremus) (November 10, 1870 – February 27, 1937) was an American actress. She was one of the United States' best-known stage actresses of the early 20th century.

Odell's first major success was The Prisoner of Zenda, in which she appeared for 400 nights in New York. She later performed in Little Boy Blue, The Student Prince, Show Boat, and Tobacco Road. Her career spanned almost 40 years.

Odell was found dead of a heart attack in her dressing room just before a performance of Tobacco Road. The show went on. She was buried at the cemetery of St. Peter's Catholic Church in Beaufort, South Carolina.
