= Famous Players Film Company =

Film studio founded by Adolph Zukor and the Frohman brothers

The Famous Players Film Company
- Industry: Motion pictures
- Founded: May 8, 1912; 114 years ago
- Founder: Adolph Zukor
- Defunct: 1916; 110 years ago
- Fate: Corporate merger
- Successors: Famous Players–Lasky; Paramount Pictures
- Headquarters: Hollywood, California, United States

The Famous Players Film Company was an American film company founded in New York City in 1912 by Adolph Zukor in partnership with the Frohman brothers, who were theatre owners and producers.

== History ==
Discussions to form the company were held at The Lambs, a famous theater club where Charles and Daniel Frohman were members. The company advertised "Famous Players in Famous Plays" and its first release was the French film Les Amours de la reine Élisabeth (1912) starring Sarah Bernhardt and Lou Tellegen. Its first actual production was The Count of Monte Cristo (1912, released 1913), directed by Joseph A. Golden and Edwin S. Porter and starring James O'Neill, the father of dramatist Eugene O'Neill.

In 1914, the company purchased the former headquarters of New York City's Ninth Mounted Cavalry unit at 221 West 26th Street in Manhattan. The cavernous brick building made excellent filming space for Zukor, and the modernized site is still used today as Chelsea Television Studios.

Hiring its performers straight from the Broadway stage, Famous Players had an early roster of some of the theater world's biggest names including Marguerite Clark, William Farnum, Gaby Deslys, Hazel Dawn, and H. B. Warner. The company also featured cinema's biggest star of the era, Mary Pickford, and presented theater idol John Barrymore in his first two feature films. The company produced both short and feature-length productions.

In 1916, the company merged with the Jesse L. Lasky Feature Play Company to form Famous Players–Lasky Corporation, which later became Paramount Pictures.

=== Famous Players Fiction Studios ===
In 1915, the company established Famous Players Fiction Studios at 5300 Melrose Avenue in Hollywood. The new studio's first film starred Mary Pickford. The studio later became Clune Studio, then California Studio, then Gross-Krasne, followed by Producers Studios Inc., and is now known as Raleigh Studios. Raleigh Studios is known for being the site of Gunsmoke, Perry Mason, and Let's Make a Deal. It is one of the oldest studios in Hollywood.

== See also ==
- Famous Players theatres
- Lists of Paramount Pictures films
