= Burning Daylight (disambiguation) =

Burning Daylight is a 1910 novel by Jack London.

Burning Daylight may also refer to:

- Burning Daylight: The Adventures of 'Burning Daylight' in Alaska, a 1914 American adventure film
- Burning Daylight: The Adventures of 'Burning Daylight' in Civilization, a 1914 American adventure film
- Burning Daylight (1920 film), a 1920 silent film drama
- Burning Daylight (1928 film), a 1928 silent dramatic action adventure film
- "Burning Daylight" (song), a 2023 song by Mia Nicolai and Dion Cooper

== See also ==
- Burnin' Daylight, an American country music band
