= Hettie Gray Baker =

American film editor (1880–1957)

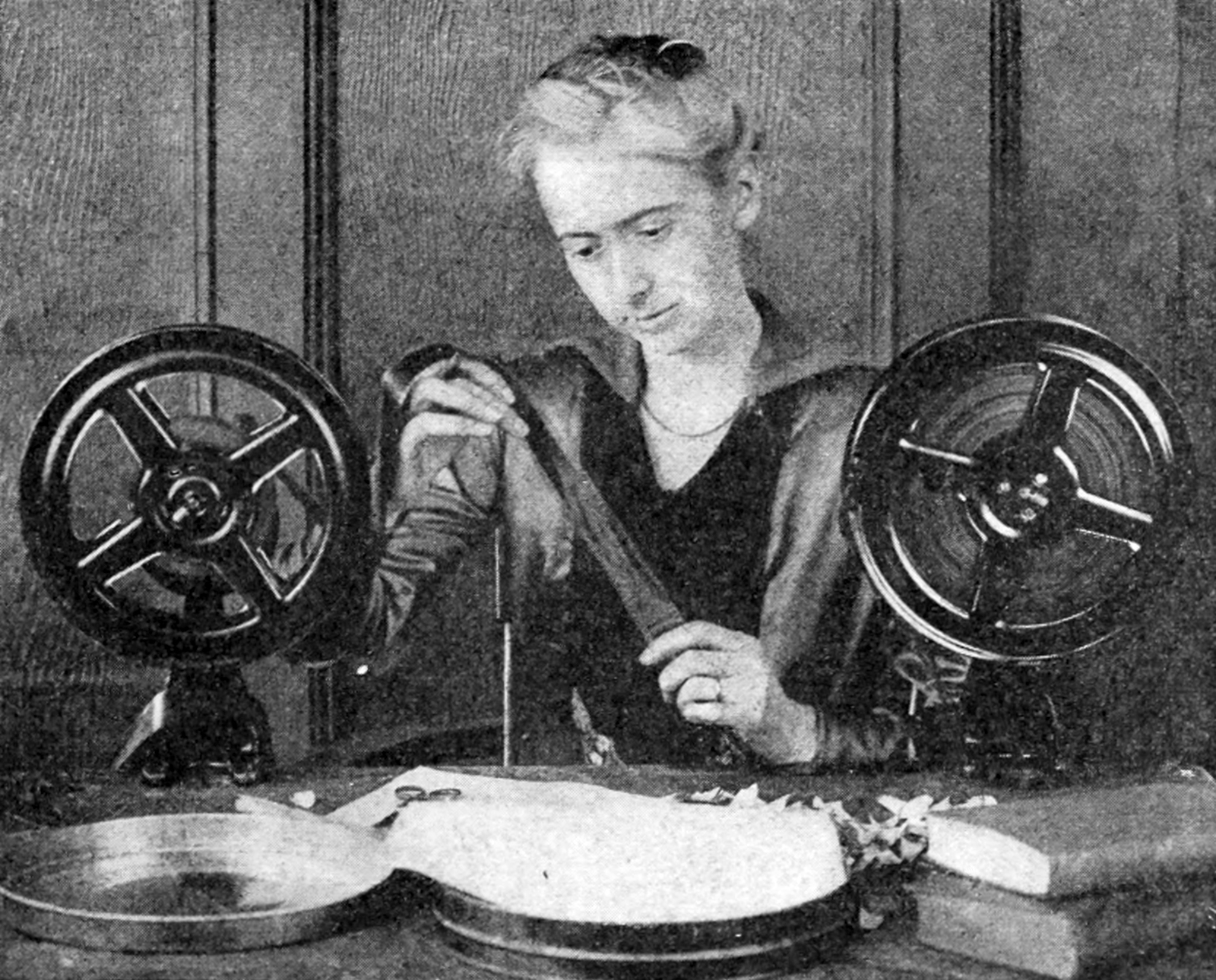
- Hettie Gray Baker in 1918
- Born: July 12, 1880; Hartford, Connecticut, U.S.
- Died: November 14, 1957 (aged 77); New York State, U.S.
- Resting place: Cape Cod, Massachusetts, U.S.
- Occupation: Film editor
- Parent(s): Josiah Q. Baker; Lizzie A. Chipman

Hettie Gray Baker (July 12, 1880 – November 14, 1957) was an American film editor.

== Biography ==
Born in Hartford, Connecticut, the daughter of Josiah Q. Baker and his wife Lizzie A. Chipman, Hettie attended public high school in Hartford before undertaking a special course of study at Simmons College in Boston. She was employed at the Hartford Public Library during 1900–03, where she began writing movie scenarios during her spare moments. She sold her first story, titled, Treasure Trove, to Vitagraph Studios. for $20 (equivalent to $774 in 2025), and continued to write and sell freelance works for the next six years. In 1903, she became a private secretary for the School for Social Workers in Boston, where she worked until 1907 when she was hired as a librarian for the Hartford Bar Library, a small law library.

In 1913, she was employed by Hobart Bosworth's film company as a story editor. Her work included scenario writing and scripting stories for a series of silent films based upon the work of Jack London. These included Burning Daylight (1914), The Valley of the Moon (1914), and The Chechako (1914). In February 1914, she was one of the co-founders of the Photoplay Authors League – a precursor of the Screen Writers Guild – and during the first year of operation was elected vice president and a member of the board of control.

In 1916, she went to work for Fox Film Corporation (later renamed Twentieth Century Fox) as a film editor. During her first year, she edited A Daughter of the Gods, Hollywood's first film with a million dollar budget, and, listed as H.G. Baker, may have been the first female editor to be acknowledged in a film's credits. She was the editor for Queen of the Sea (1918) starring Annette Kellerman, and The Iron Horse (1924), directed by John Ford. In total, she was a writer and editor for over 20 films, but was rarely credited.

By 1938, Hettie was a movie executive, serving as censor representative for Twentieth Century Fox. Being a cat-lover, later in her life she wrote several books about cats.

== Filmography ==
Year	Films	Credit	Notes
1911	Treasure Trove	Scenario	Extant at Library of Congress; Short film
1912	The Irony of Fate	Scenario	Extant at Library of Congress; Short film
1912	Old Songs and Memories	Scenario	Lost film Short film
1912	The Spanish Cavalier	Scenario	Lost film Short film
1912	Sue Simpkins’s Ambition	Scenario	Lost film Short film
1912	The Way of a Man With a Maid	Scenario	Lost film Short film
1912	Where Love Is, There God Is Also	Scenario	Lost film Short film
1913	Around the Battle Tree	Scenario	Lost film Short film
1913	The Poet and the Soldier	Scenario	Lost film Short film
1913	Sally in Our Alley	Scenario	Lost film Short film
1913	Songs of Truce	Scenario	Lost film Short film
1913	Their Stepmother	Scenario	Lost film Short film
1913	The Wordless Message	Scenario	Extant at BFI; Short film
1914	The Chechako	Story	Lost film
1914	John Barleycorn	Story	Lost film
1914	The Real Thing in Cowboys	Scenario	Lost film Short film
1914	The Story of the Willow Pattern	Scenario	Lost film Short film
1914	The Valley of the Moon	Scenario	Lost film
1914	Burning Daylight	Story	Lost film
1914	Martin Eden	Scenario	Partially extant at Library of Congress
1914	An Odyssey of the North	Story	Lost film uncredited
1915	Buckshot John	Scenario	Extant at Library of Congress
1916	A Daughter of the Gods	Editor	Lost film
1916	Converging Paths	Scenario	Lost film Short film
1916	The Man He Might Have Been	Scenario	Lost film Short film
1917	The Right Hand Path	Scenario	Lost film
1917	The Honor System	Titles	Lost film
1917	The Legend of the Willow Plate	Scenario	Extant at Library of Congress; Short film
1918	The Strange Woman	Titles	Lost film
1922	Nero	Editor	Lost film
1922	The Town That Forgot God	Editor	Lost film
1922	Tom Mix in Arabia	Scenario; Editor	Lost film
1926	3 Bad Men	Editor	Extant uncredited

== Bibliography ==
- Canting bookplates, 1926
- Cating bookplates, 1926
- Motion picture bookplates, 1930
- Bookplates of Hettie Gray Baker, 1947
- Your Siamese cat, 1951
- 195 cat tales, 1953
