= Constantine Theater =

Theater in Pawhuska, Oklahoma, US

Coordinates: 36.6633°N 96.3407°W

The Constantine Theatre, located in Pawhuska, Oklahoma, is a historic venue built in the early 20th century. It has served the community through performances and film screenings, and underwent a major restoration effort in the 1980s. The theater continues to play a role in Pawhuska’s cultural life.

== History ==
=== Early History (1914–1926) ===
The Constantine Theatre opened informally in 1914 with a silent film screening of Neptune's Daughter, starring Annette Kellerman, with admission priced at 25 cents. Its official grand opening took place on December 22, 1914, featuring a live performance of The Prince of Pilsen, a popular Broadway musical. The opening included formal attendance and community participation, reflecting the theatre’s early prominence.

During this period, the Constantine Theatre attracted large audiences with vaudeville acts, live music, and public events. It also hosted Osage oil lease auctions, which brought prominent oilmen such as Frank Phillips, William G. Skelly, and Ernest W. Marland to Pawhuska. Despite events like the 1915 flood, the theatre remained active and became a notable part of the town's cultural landscape.

=== Transition to a Movie Theatre (1926–1984) ===
By 1926, the Constantine Theatre transitioned to film and was renamed the Kihekah Movie Theatre as cinema became more popular. Ownership changed several times, and many original design features were altered or removed. The theatre remained in operation as Pawhuska's last indoor movie house until it closed in 1974 due to declining attendance and financial difficulties. It then sat vacant for a decade during a broader period of economic decline in the area.

=== Restoration Efforts (1984–1987) ===
In 1984, local residents formed the Pawhuska Downtown Revitalization and Preservation Association (PDRPA) to restore the deteriorated theatre. The project aimed to return the building to its historical appearance and qualify it for the National Register of Historic Places, which was achieved in 1986.

PDRPA raised approximately $70,000 toward a $300,000 renovation goal. Restoration involved community volunteers, including high school students and assistance from external programs. Work included water removal, electrical and plumbing replacement, and refurbishment of decorative features.

=== Architectural Features and Renovations ===
The Constantine Theatre is noted for its Greek Revival architecture. Key features include a terracotta proscenium, pressed tin ceiling, and original color palettes uncovered during restoration. Handcrafted theatrical masks were added to the exterior in the 1980s. Interior finishes, such as brick red and gold accents, were chosen to reflect the building’s early 20th-century design.

=== Community Impact and Legacy (1987–present) ===
The theatre’s restoration coincided with broader preservation efforts in Pawhuska and became a symbol of community revitalization. It remains a cultural venue and is managed by a volunteer board.

Local legend claims the theatre is haunted by Sappho Constantine Brown, daughter of the original owner. Reports of her ghost appearing backstage have become part of community folklore and were featured in a 1987 Tulsa World article.

Today, the Constantine Theatre hosts live performances, film screenings, and community events.

== Bibliography ==
- Southall, Richard (2013). Haunted Route 66. Llewellyn Publications. p. 101. ISBN 978-0738726366.
