= Neptune's Daughter =

Neptune's Daughter may refer to:

- Neptune's Daughter (1914 film)
- Neptune's Daughter (1949 film)
- Neptune's Daughter (1906 play) at the New York Hippodrome
