= Robert Hood Bowers =

American composer and conductor

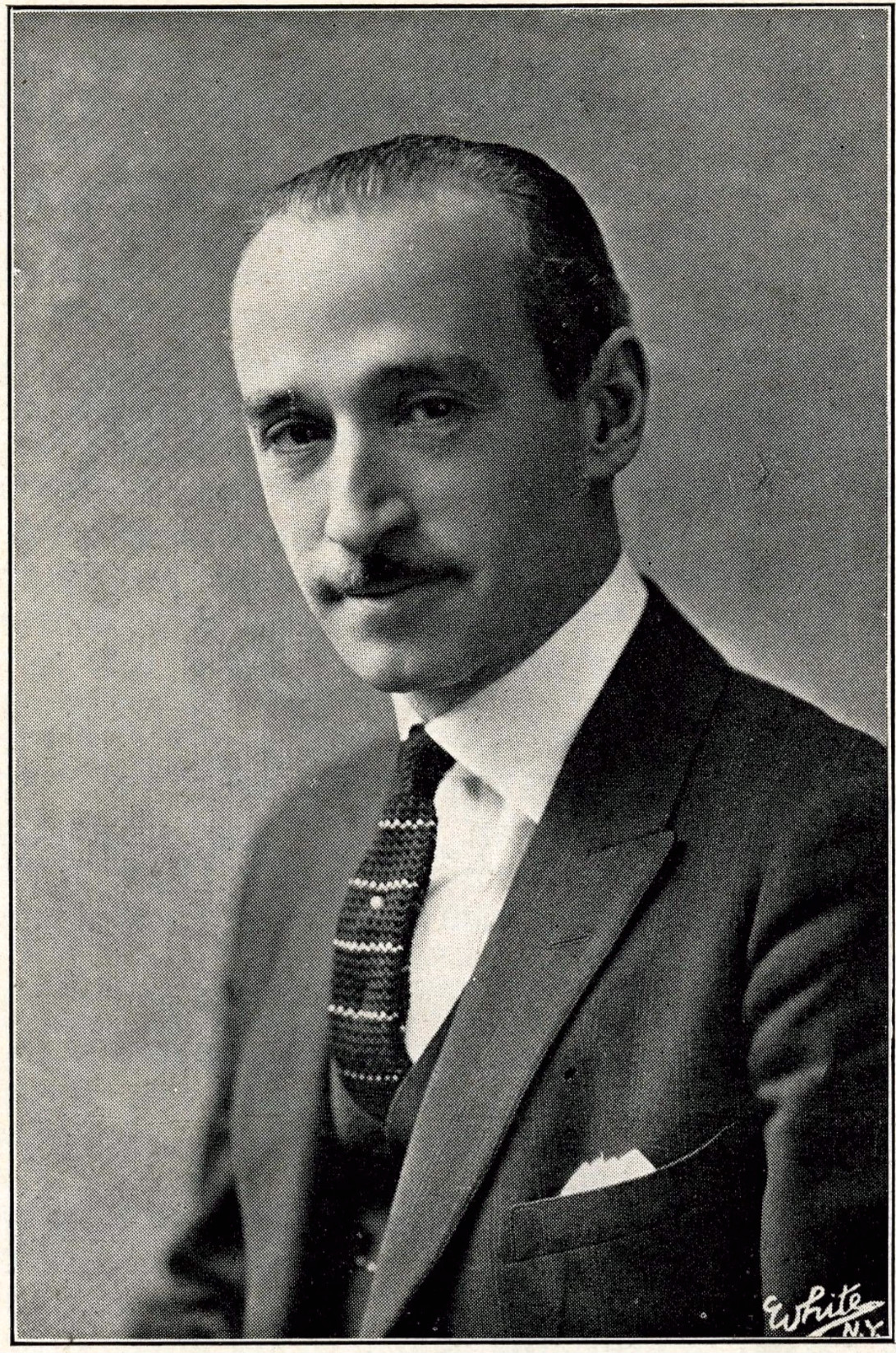
Portrait of Robert Hood Bowers

Robert Hood Bowers (24 May 1877 – 29 December 1941) was an American composer, conductor and musical director of operettas and stage musicals, and a conductor and musical director for radio. He composed the musical scores for some of the most popular silent movies, including Aloma of the South Seas and A Daughter of the Gods.

== Biography ==
Born and raised in Chambersburg, Pennsylvania, Robert Hood Bowers was the eldest son of Ellen Graham Heyser and Oliver C. Bowers (a district attorney of Franklin County, and nominee for the Democratic Party for Pennsylvania's 17th congressional district for the 1904 elections). When Bowers was 14, he went to the Franklin & Marshall College in Lancaster, graduating in 1896. He started working as head of the Musical Department of Cheltenham Military Academy. At the same time, he continued his musical studies first with Constantin von Sternberg and later with Frederick Grant Gleason at the Conservatory of Chicago, where he won the gold medal in 1902. He married Virginia Belving on September 16, 1905. Their only son was also called Robert Hood Bowers (born in 1906, he became a professor of English at the University of Florida.)

Working as a conductor for Victor Herbert for five years, and as a conductor at the radio stations WMCA, WEAF and WOR, as well as for the Columbia Phonograph Company, Robert Hood Bowers composed songs, school music, operettas and musicals. He also composed dances in an 'oriental' style for modern dance pioneer Ruth St. Denis and music for comic operas of Jesse Louis Lasky. He was employed at the School of Radio Technique at the Rockefeller Center, as the head of the musical department for five years before his death. He died in New York in 1941.

== Reception ==
His score for A Daughter of the Gods, which was the most expensive movie made until then, was created especially for the movie, which was then unusual. The score was explicitly mentioned in the advertisements for the movie and was described in 1921 as the most memorable up to that time, and as "a high point of motion picture music".

== Film scores ==
- A Daughter of the Gods, 1916
- Aloma of the South Seas, 1926

== Musicals, plays and operettas ==
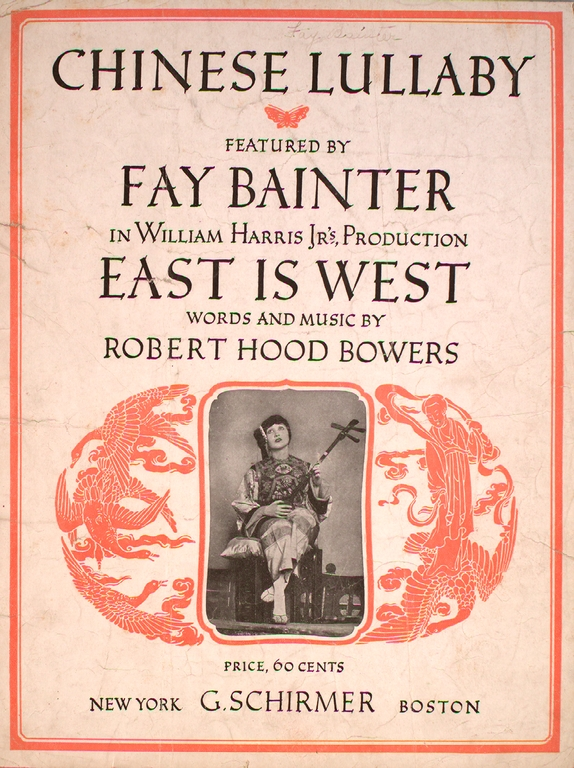
Cover of the sheet music of Chinese Lullaby, a song created by Bowers for the musical East is West in 1919

- A Certain Party, 1911, written by Edward W. Townsend and Frank O'Malley
- A Lonely Romeo, 1919
- California, 1912, codirected by Cecil B. DeMille
- East is West, 1919
- East of Suez, 1922
- Listen In, 1929
- Miss 1917, 1917
- Oh, Ernest!, a musical adaptation of The Importance of Being Earnest 1927
- Old English, 1924
- Rubes and Roses, 1903
- The Antique Girl, a Jesse Lasky production, cocreated by Bowers, Cecil B. DeMille and William LeBaron
- The Beauties, 1914, Jesse Lasky, written by William LeBaron
- The Hoyden, 1907, with Elsie Janis as singer
- The Legionnaires
- The Maid and the Mummy, 1904
- The Open Road
- The Paraders, 1905 or earlier
- The Red Rose, 1911
- The Redheads, 1913
- The Scarecrow, 1911
- The Silver Star, 1909, danced by Adeline Genée
- The Vanderbilt Cub, 1906 with Elsie Janis as singer
- The Wife Tamers, 1910
- Ziegfeld Follies, 1919
