= Queen of the Sea (film) =

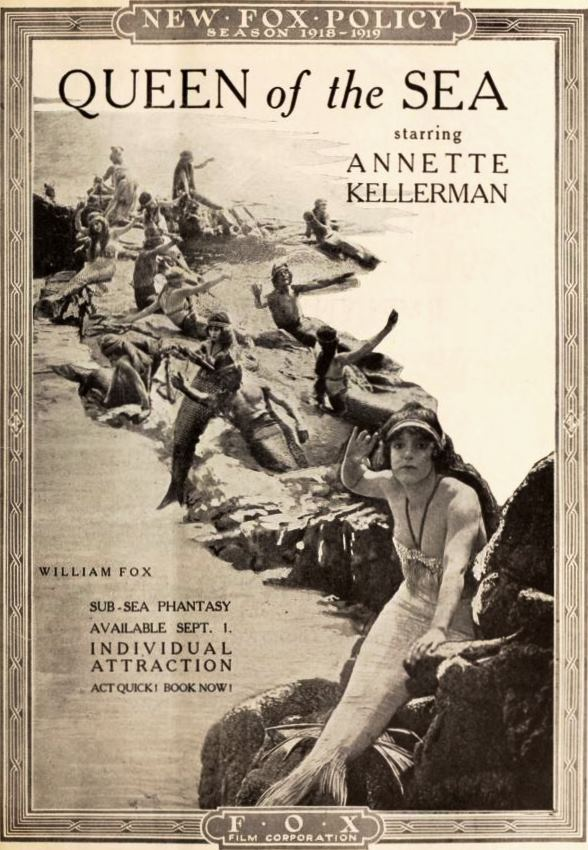
- Advertisement in Exhibitors Herald
- Directed by: John G. Adolfi
- Screenplay by: John G. Adolfi
- Story by: George Bronson Howard
- Produced by: William Fox
- Starring: Annette Kellerman; Hugh Thompson
- Cinematography: Carl Gregory; Frank D. Williams
- Distributed by: Fox Film Corporation
- Release date: September 1, 1918
- Running time: 5 reels
- Country: United States
- Language: Silent (English intertitles)

Queen of the Sea is a 1918 American silent fantasy film released by Fox Film Corporation that was directed by John G. Adolfi and starred Australian swimmer Annette Kellerman. This film is presumed to be lost.

== Plot ==
As described in the trade magazine Exhibitors Herald:

Merilla, Queen of the Sea, finds a book among wreckage at the bottom of the sea which contains a prophesy that she will save four human beings and then receive the reward of a human body of her own with an immortal soul. King Boreas, master of the storms, wrecks many ships and sends his sirens to drag the victims to certain death. Merilla saves the predicted lives, and Boreas confines her in a cave. She is freed by Prince Hero, the fourth life she has saved, who is on his way to meet his betrothed. They fall in love with each other, but Ariela tells them that they must be unselfish. The Prince goes on to meet the Princess, who is really in love with one of her courtiers. Boreas captures the Princess and confines her in the Tower of Knives and Swords, a worse dungeon than the one in which Merilla had been confined. Merilla has received a human body and such a beautiful soul that she resolves to rescue the Princess, even though this will mean the loss of the Prince. She goes to the Tower and reaches the Princess, encourages her, and then walks out on a spider's thread to a point where she can warn the Prince of the great danger. He and his knights come just in time to save them from a horrible fate. The Princess confesses her love for the courtier, and the two couples are then happy in possession of each other.

== Cast ==
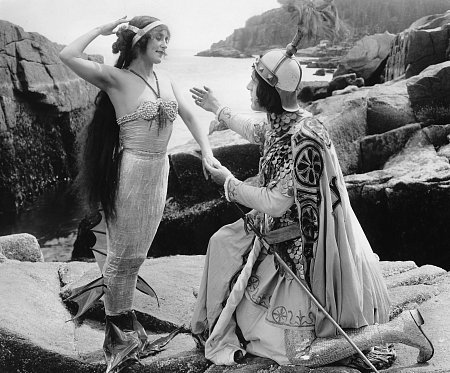
Still with Annette Kellerman and Hugh Thompson

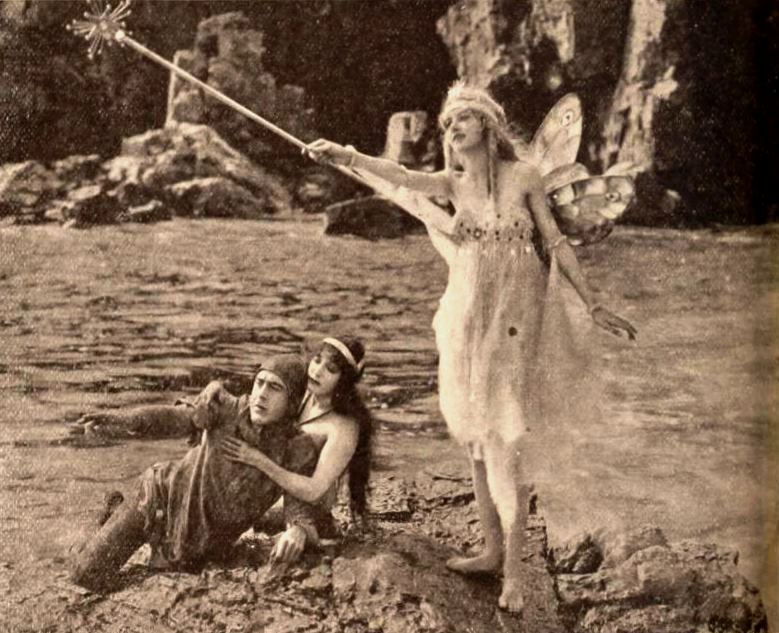
Still with Hugh Thompson, Annette Kellerman, and Beth Ivins.

- Annette Kellerman as Merilla, Queen of the Sea
- Hugh Thompson as Prince Hero
- Mildred Keats as Princess Leandra
- Walter Law as King Boreas
- Beth Ivins as Ariela (credited as Beth Irvins)
- Philip Van Loan as Prime Minister
- Fred Drucker as Clovis
- Louis Dean as The King
- Carey Lee as The Queen
- Minnie Methol as The Duenna

== Production ==
Queen of the Sea followed Fox's big budget picture A Daughter of the Gods, another fantasy spectacle designed around Annette Kellerman and her aquatic abilities. Kellerman was well known for stunt dives; at least one high dive was incorporated in the plot of Queen as well as a tight-rope walk, both executed by Kellerman herself. After Queen of the Sea Kellerman would only make two more major motion pictures.

Cast and crew spent two months in 1917 filming on Mount Desert Island in Maine; additional exterior shots were filmed in Bermuda, Jamaica, Florida, Mexico, and California.

Panchromatic film, which provided superior tonal quality but had a problematically short shelf life, was first used in motion pictures for some of the exterior shots on Queen of the Sea.

== Censorship ==
Before the film could be exhibited in Kansas, the Kansas Board of Review required the shortening of Merilla's transformation scene, to eliminate a view of an exposed breast.
