= Burning Daylight (1920 film) =

1920 film by Edward Sloman

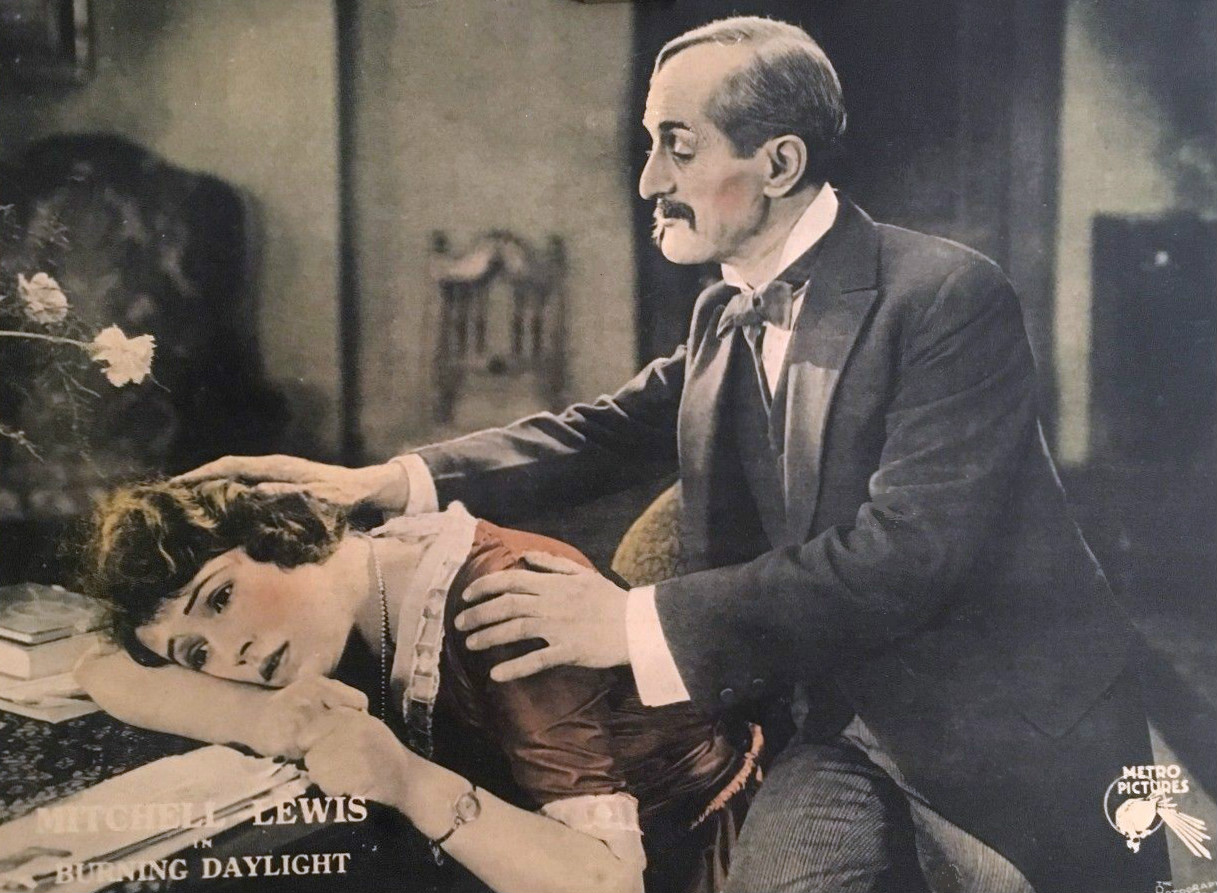
- Lobby card
- Directed by: Edward Sloman
- Written by: Albert Shelby Le Vino
- Based on: Burning Daylight by Jack London
- Produced by: C. E. Shurtleff Inc.
- Starring: Mitchell Lewis; Helen Ferguson; William V. Mong
- Cinematography: Jackson Rose
- Distributed by: Metro Pictures
- Release date: May 20, 1920
- Running time: 6 reels
- Country: United States
- Language: Silent (English intertitles)

Burning Daylight is a 1920 American silent drama film directed by Edward Sloman with Mitchell Lewis, Helen Ferguson, and William V. Mong starring. It was distributed by Metro Pictures. It is based on the 1910 Jack London novel of the same name.

A subsequent version, Burning Daylight was filmed in 1928 by First National Pictures. It starred Milton Sills and Doris Kenyon.

== Cast ==
- Mitchell Lewis as Burning Daylight
- Helen Ferguson as Dora
- William V. Mong as Necessity
- Alfred Allen as Nathaniel Letton
- Edward Jobson as Dowsett
- Robert Bolder as Guggenhammer
- Gertrude Astor as Lucille
- Arthur Edmund Carew as Arthur Howison
- Newton Hall as Jack
- Aaron Edwards as Crandall

== Production ==
The film was partially shot on location at Truckee, California.

== Preservation status ==
A print of Burning Daylight survives in a foreign archive.
