= The Valley of the Moon (novel) =

1913 novel by Jack London

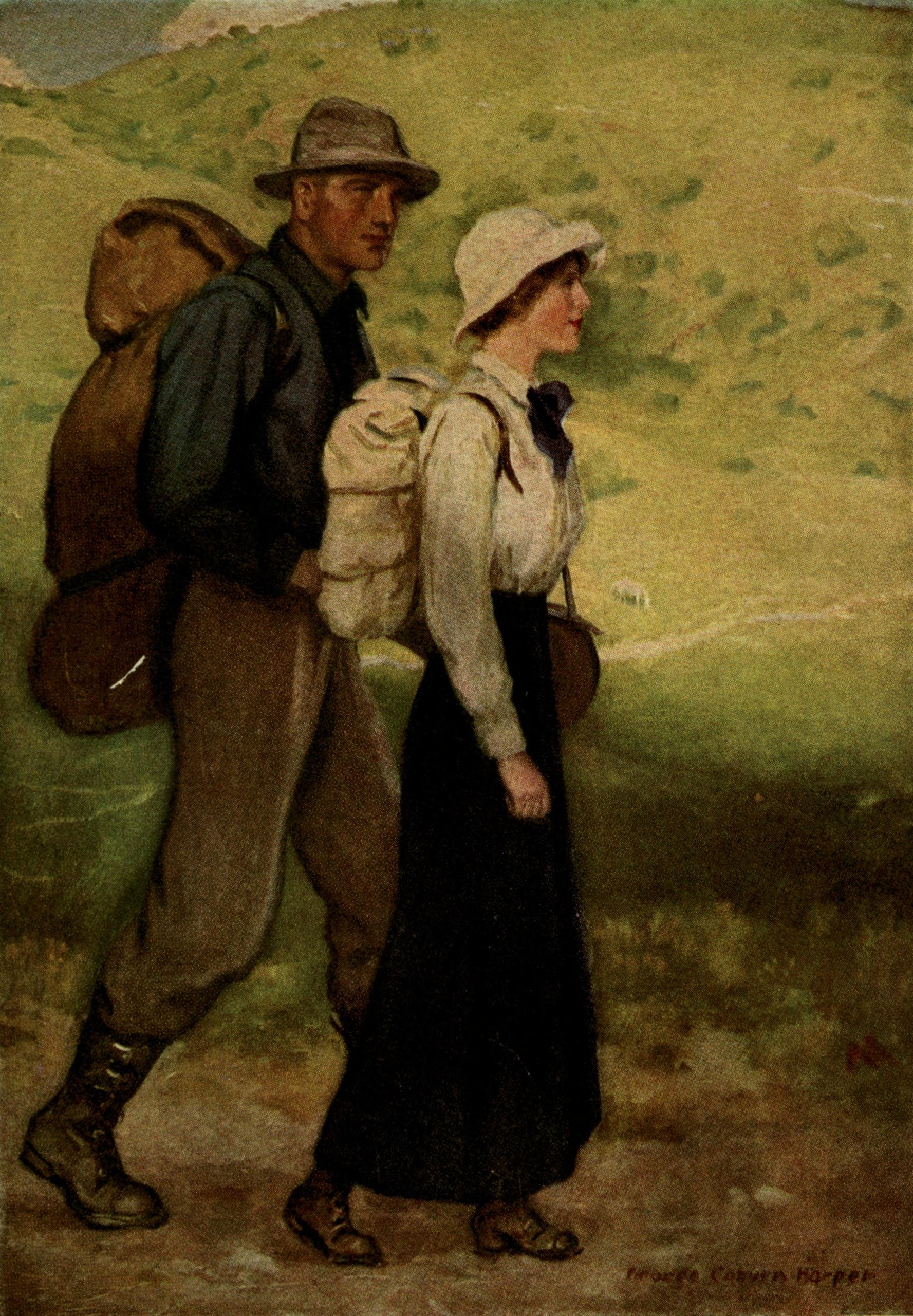
- Frontispiece to the 1913 first edition.
- Author: Jack London
- Language: English
- Publication date: 1913
- Publication place: United States

The Valley of the Moon (1913) is a novel by American writer Jack London. The valley where it is set is located north of the San Francisco Bay Area in Sonoma County, California where Jack London was a resident; he built his ranch in Glen Ellen.

== Plot summary ==
The novel The Valley of the Moon is a story of a working-class couple, Billy and Saxon Roberts, struggling laborers in Oakland at the Turn-of-the-Century, who leave city life behind and search Central and Northern California for suitable farmland to own. The book is notable for its scenes in which the proletarian heroes enjoy fellowship with the artists' colony in Carmel, and their settling in the Valley of the Moon.

=== Beginnings ===
The book begins with Billy as a Teamster and Saxon working in a laundry. Billy has also boxed professionally with some success, but decided there was no future in it. He was particularly upset by one bout in which he was fighting a friend and they had to continue fighting and making a good show of it after his friend injured a hand.

Billy and Saxon's early married life is disrupted by a major wave of strikes. Billy is involved in violent attacks on strikebreakers, and goes to jail. Saxon loses her baby in the backwash of the violence. She hears socialist arguments but does not definitively accept them, later meeting an old woman with an individualist view on relationships, describing how she successfully attached herself to a series of rich men. She also meets a lad called Jack who has built his own boat and seems to be based on Jack London himself as a teenager.

=== Rural Quest ===
When Billy is released from jail, Saxon insists that they leave the city and try to find their own farm, though they discover that the government no longer gives out land freely. They pass through an area dominated by the Portuguese, who are described to have arrived very poor and prospered by using the land more intensively than earlier European settlers, whom they displaced. A few days of their journey are spent with a middle-class woman who grows flowers and vegetables and has a flourishing business selling high-quality products to the wealthy.

Moving on, they take a liking to an artists' colony but decide to continue looking for their own place. Billy begins dealing in horses as well as driving them. He returns to the boxing ring, using a new name so he will not be identified against an up-and-coming boxer, and wins the fight within seconds. He uses his reward of 300 dollars to buy a pair of horses and, after a victory in a rematch, resolves to fight no more.

They also encounter well-known writer and journalist 'Jack Hastings', generally considered to be a self-portrait of Jack London at the time of the book's conception. Hastings' wife—presumably modeled after London's second wife—is described as bearing some resemblance to Saxon. They discuss the wastefulness of the early American farmers, namely their habits of exhausting land and moving on, reflecting Jack London's views on sustainable agriculture.

Directed to their 'Valley of the Moon', Billy and Saxon settle and live there happily at the book's end. 'Sonoma Valley' is considered by a character to be a Native American name meaning 'Valley of the Moon', though this etymology is disputed.

== Influences ==
Though not one of London's most popular books, The Valley of the Moon remains in print and can also be downloaded. It has been described as "road novel fifty years before Kerouac" and as reflecting London's loss of hope in socialism and growing interest in scientific farming, as well as a hymn of praise to his second wife Charmian.

A film was made in 1914. Billy was played by actor / director Jack Conway and Saxon by Myrtle Stedman.

The novel is referenced in Malcolm Lowry's Under the Volcano, by the protagonist Geoffrey Firmin (the Consul). It is referenced in Georges Perec's La Vie mode d'emploi, which also references the Malcolm Lowry book. The novel is referenced in Joan Didion's memoir Where I Was From
