= John Barleycorn (film) =

- Directed by: Hobart Bosworth
- Written by: Hettie Gray Baker
- Based on: novel John Barleycorn by Jack London
- Produced by: Hobart Bosworth
- Starring: Elmer Clifton; Hobart Bosworth
- Distributed by: State Rights; W. W. Hodkinson
- Release date: July 1914
- Running time: 6 reels
- Country: USA
- Languages: Silent; English titles

John Barleycorn is a 1914 silent film drama produced and directed by Hobart Bosworth. It was distributed through State Rights and W. W. Hodkinson.

Some of the film was shot on location in Oakland and San Francisco, California.

== Cast ==
- Elmer Clifton - Jack, 3rd period
- Antrim Short - Jack, 2nd period
- Matty Roubert - Jack, 1st period
- Viola Barry - Haydee
- Hobart Bosworth - Scratch Nelson
- Joe Ray
- Elmo Lincoln
- Dick La Reno
- Rhea Haines

== Preservation ==
With no prints of John Barleycorn located in any film archives, it is considered a lost film.
