= Venus of the South Seas =

1924 film

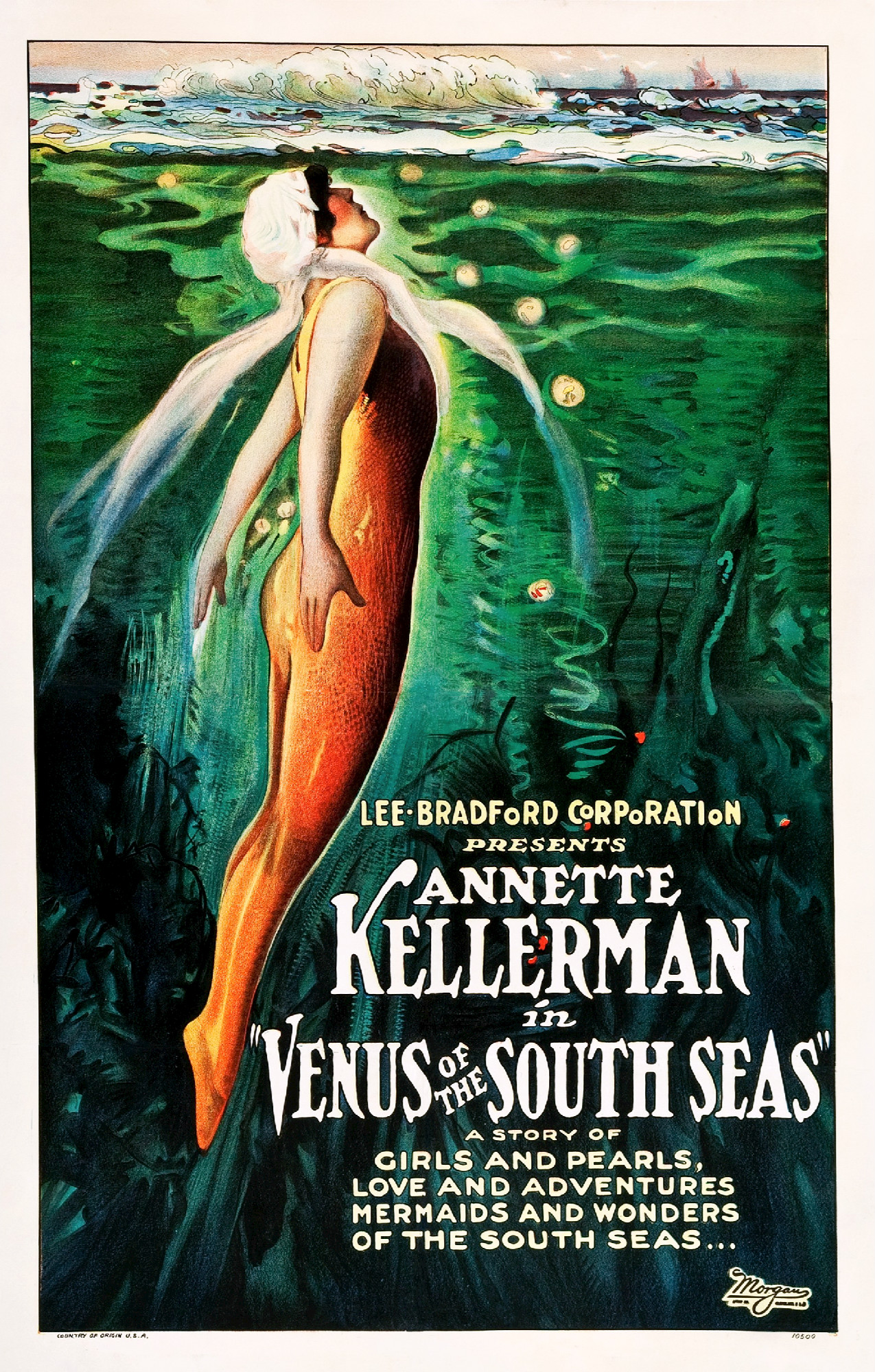
- Film poster
- Directed by: James R. Sullivan
- Written by: Alice Charbonnet-Kellermann
- Starring: Annette Kellerman
- Cinematography: Fred Bentley
- Color process: Prizma Color
- Production company: Lee-Bradford Corporation
- Distributed by: Davis Distributing Co.
- Release date: February 1924
- Running time: 55 minutes
- Country: United States
- Language: Silent (English intertitles)

Venus of the South Seas, also known as Venus of the Southern Seas, is a 1924 silent drama film directed by James R. Sullivan starring swimmer Annette Kellerman. It was one of the last films with footage in the Prizma Color process.

The 55-minute four-reel film was made by an American company and shot in Nelson, New Zealand. It includes substantial footage taking place underwater. The film, with the final reel in Prizmacolor, was restored by the Library of Congress in 2004.

== Plot ==
Short clip from the film

The daughter of a man who owns a South Seas pearl business falls in love with a wealthy traveler. Her father dies, leaving her the business, but a greedy ship captain schemes to take the business from her.

== Cast ==
- Annette Kellerman as Shona Royal
- Roland Purdie as John Royal
- Norman French as Captain John Drake
- Robert Ramsey as Robert Quane

== Home Release ==
“Venus of The South Seas” was released in its 55 minute entirety on Region 1 DVD by Grapevine Video on 21 June 2011; restored from 35mm film, alongside surviving footage of the original 1914 film Neptune’s Daughter (1914 film).

== See also ==
- List of early color feature films
