= Lee-Bradford Corporation =

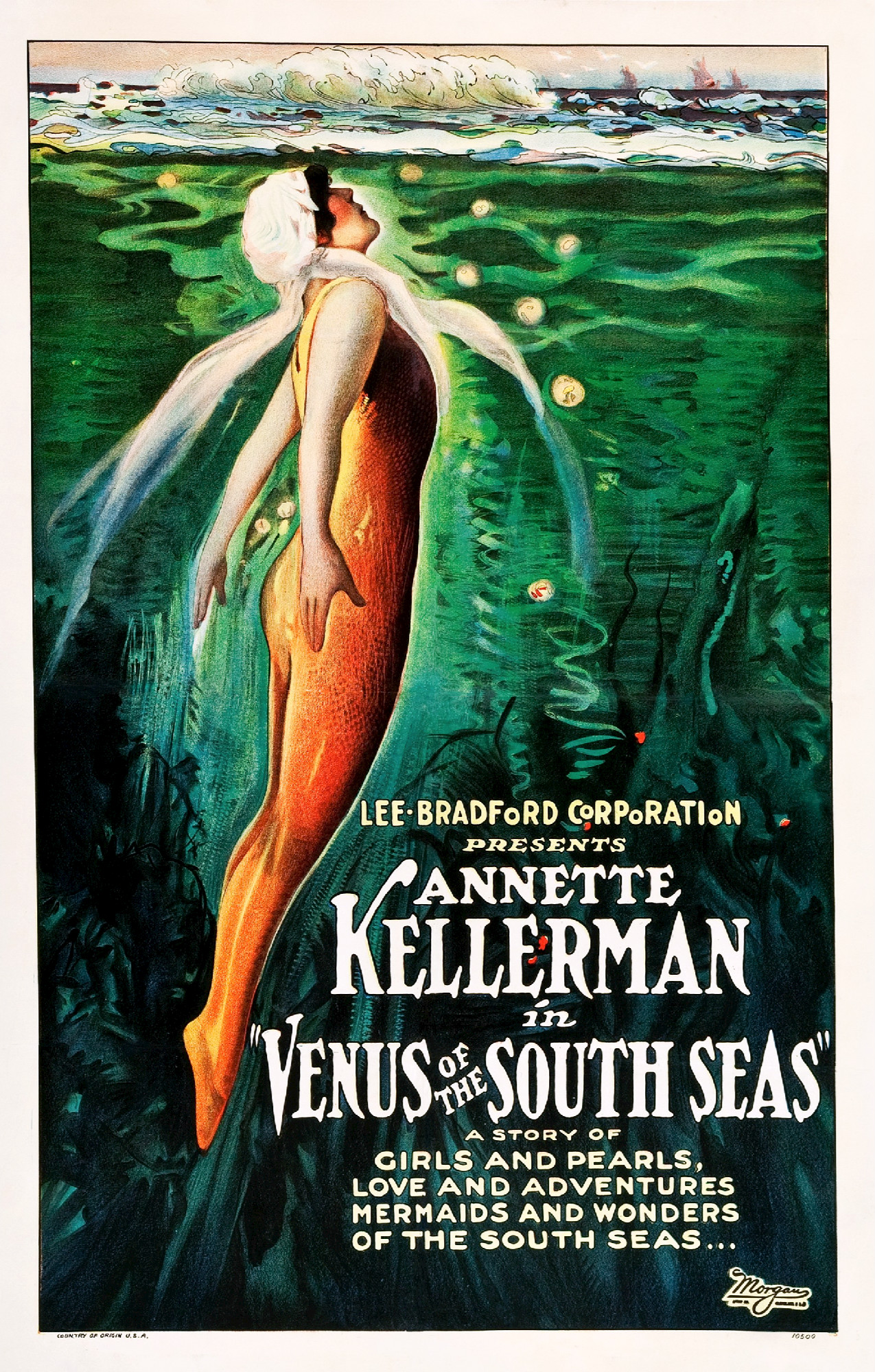
A poster for the company's 1924 release Venus of the South Seas.

The Lee-Bradford Corporation was an American film distributor of the silent era. It was formed by Arthur A. Lee and F.G. Bradford who gave their names to the company. Based in New York City, it handled the output of independent production companies as well as foreign imports. The company arranged a tie-up with the emerging British studio Gainsborough Pictures.

== Selected filmography ==
- Determination (1922)
- Flesh and Spirit (1922)
- Unconquered Woman (1922)
- Is Money Everything? (1923)
- Venus of the South Seas (1924)
- Who's Cheating? (1924)
- For Woman's Favor (1924)
- Lure of the Yukon (1924)
- Passion's Pathway (1924)
- Unrestrained Youth (1925)
- Wolf Blood (1925)
- Down Upon the Suwanee River (1925)
- The Lure of the Track (1925)
- Typhoon Love (1926)
- The Wives of the Prophet (1926)

== Bibliography ==
- Cook, Pam. Gainsborough Pictures. Cassell, 1997.
- Slide, Anthony. The New Historical Dictionary of the American Film Industry. Routledge, 2014.
