= May Summerbelle =

Australian composer (1867–1947)

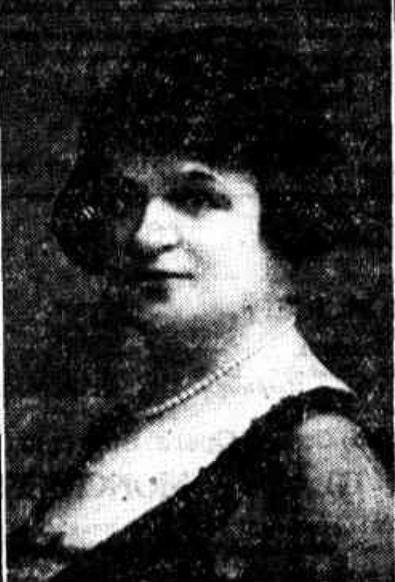
- May Summerbelle in 1924

Background information
- Born: Sydney, New South Wales, Australia
- Died: 1 January 1946
- Occupations: Composer, journalist
- Years active: 1890-1930

Annie May Constance Summerbelle (1867 – 1947) was an Australian composer of light classical and popular music. She was the third daughter of Captain William and Honoriah Summerbelle of Double Bay. Her sister, Stella Clare, married Francis Joseph Bayldon, a master mariner and nautical instructor. From the late 1880s she was a student of Alice Charbonnet-Kellermann, with Summerbelle's earliest compositions appearing in the early 1890s.

Among a hundred compositions, she had music selected for the British Empire Exhibition in London. Her song So Long was played by the Australian Light Horse as the first wave embarked on the Gallipoli campaign. The song was also selected by Australian entertainers dispatched to entertain troops.

She married Herbert Glasson in 1893 and wrote 'Love is a fadeless flower' while heavily pregnant with his child. The same year Herbert was convicted and executed for murder and robbery under arms. Ms Summerbelle involved herself with repertory theatre groups via the Sydney Press-Women.

Beautiful Eyes Waltz 1908
dedicated to Grace Palotta MIDI version

== Works ==
- Thou art mine 1906
- Valkyrie, op. 6 1910-
- Myee waltz /1890
- Beaux yeux : waltz 1908
- Pop-corn : cake walk & two step 1899
- Gavotte in D : swords and roses dance : op. 4 1916
- So-long : march-song / words by John Barr; music by May Summerbelle 1914
- Wanted for the fighting line : Australian recruiting song / words by Will. M. Fleming; music by May Summerbelle 1914
- Australia! sighs my heart / words by Ada A. Holman; music by May Summerbelle
- Ave Maria
- an article for the Sunday times newspaper

== Recordings ==
Nostalgia - Piano Music by Australian Women by Jeanell Carrigan 2016 Wirrapang Pub.
