= Walpurga von Isacescu =

Austrian swimmer (1852–1925)

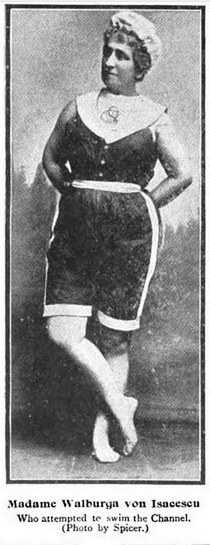
- Walpurga von Isacescu in 1900

Personal information
- Born: 1852 Vienna, Austria
- Died: May 5, 1925 (aged 72–73)

Sport
- Sport: Swimming

Walpurga von Isacescu (1852 – May 5, 1925), also seen as Walburga von Isacescu, was an Austrian swimmer, the first woman athlete to attempt a swim across the English Channel.

== Swimming career ==
Walpurga von Isacescu attempted to swim across the English Channel on 5 September 1900, a generation before the first woman succeeded at the challenge (when Gertrude Ederle did it, in 1926). She is considered the first woman swimmer to try. Unfavorable weather and tides contributed to her failure after ten hours, and twenty miles. She announced plans for another attempt in 1903.

As a member of the First Vienna Amateur Swimming Club, she gave swimming demonstrations and participated in races, as when she raced Australian swimmer Annette Kellerman in the Danube River. She swam the Danube River Race in 1902, from Melk to Vienna, in twelve hours, a record that stood until 1916. "She tows her clothes behind her in a water-tight india rubber case," one newspaper explained of her weekly swim routine.

== Personal life ==
Baroness Walpurga was the young widow of a Romanian nobleman when she took up distance swimming. She did not inherit an independent living, but worked as an office clerk at an Austrian railway to support herself.
