= Grace Palotta =

Austrian actress (1870–1959)

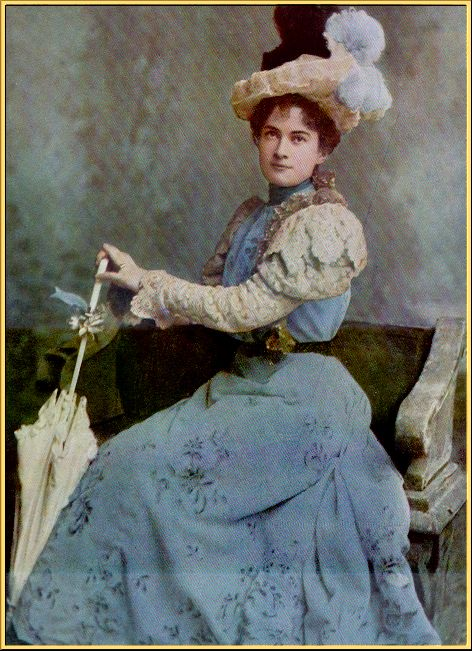
- Born: about 1870; Vienna
- Died: 21 February 1959; London
- Other names: Grace Parlotta
- Occupation(s): Actress, Gaiety girl, writer

Grace Palotta (c. 1870 – 21 February 1959) was an Austrian-born actress and writer. She was a Gaiety girl in London, and toured in Australia several times between 1895 and 1918.

== Early life ==
Palotta was born in Vienna. She explained of her origins that her mother was "French and English", her father "Hungarian and Italian". She studied at the Royal Academy of Music.

== Career ==
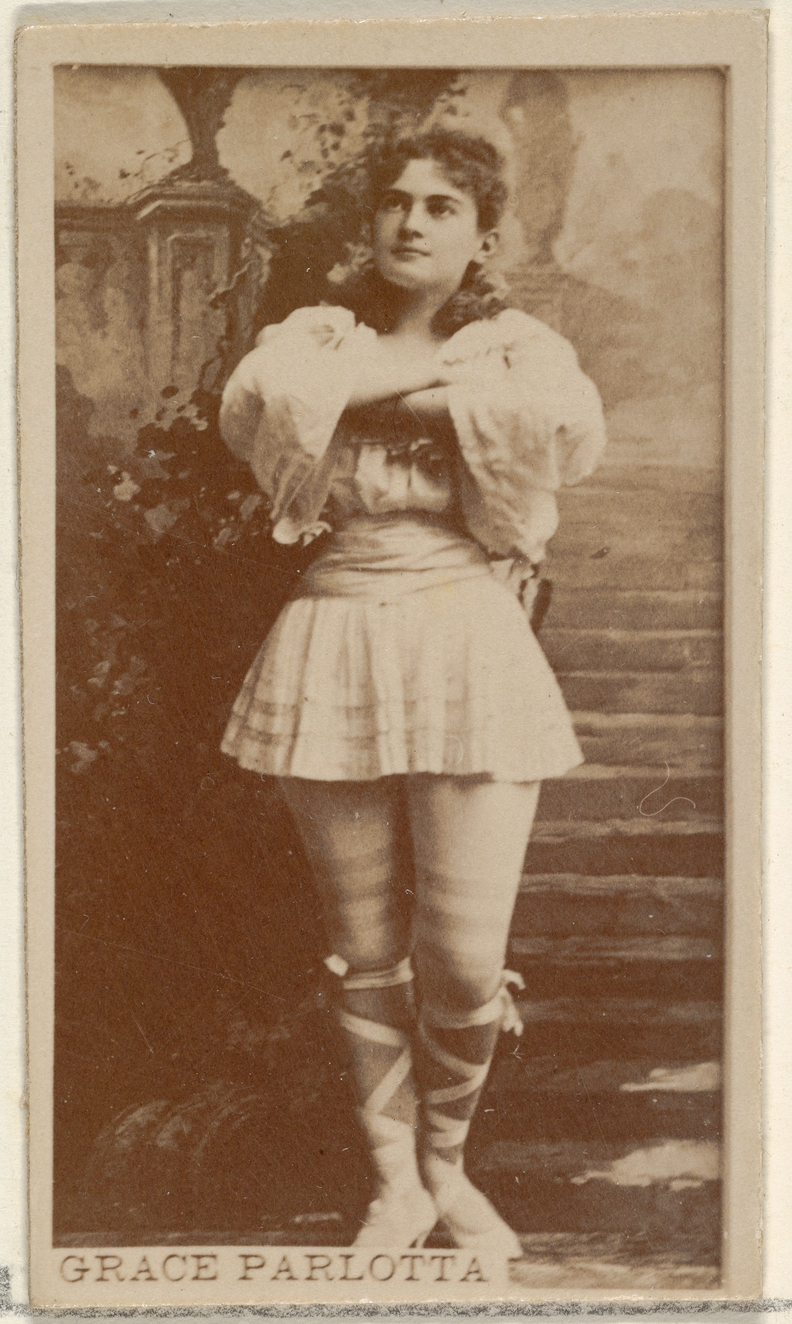
Grace Parlotta, from the Actors and Actresses series (N45, Type 8) for Virginia Brights Cigarettes, ca. 1888, Metropolitan Museum of Art

Palotta made her stage debut in London in 1893. She spent four years working for George Edwardes at the Gaiety Theatre, where she often played roles that highlighted her comic timing, her beauty, and her accented English, though her singing voice was not strong. She also performed at the Tivoli Theatre in London. She sometimes played breeches roles, including the Prince in a pantomime based on Cinderella, and the principal boy role in Aladdin. She toured in the United States in 1904, and with the Hugh J. Ward company in Australia, and New Zealand, several times, from 1895 to 1918. Palotta had roles in The Shop Girl, All Abroad, Trial by Jury, The Circus Girl, The Messenger Boy, A Runaway Girl, A Gentleman in Khaki, Florodora, Aladdin, The New Clown, and The Man from Mexico.

Palotta was a popular subject of picture postcards. She also wrote light articles and stories for periodicals.

Australian composer May Summerbelle dedicated a 1904 waltz titled 'Beaux Yeux' (Beautiful Eyes) to Grace. Her photograph appears on the cover artwork.

== Personal life ==
Palotta married Henry Samuel Kingston in 1888, in East Dereham, Norfolk. She lived in Melbourne during World War I. She lived in Vienna and Jersey in her later years. She died at a nursing home in Notting Hill, London in 1959, in her late eighties.
