= C. E. Shurtleff =

American film producer

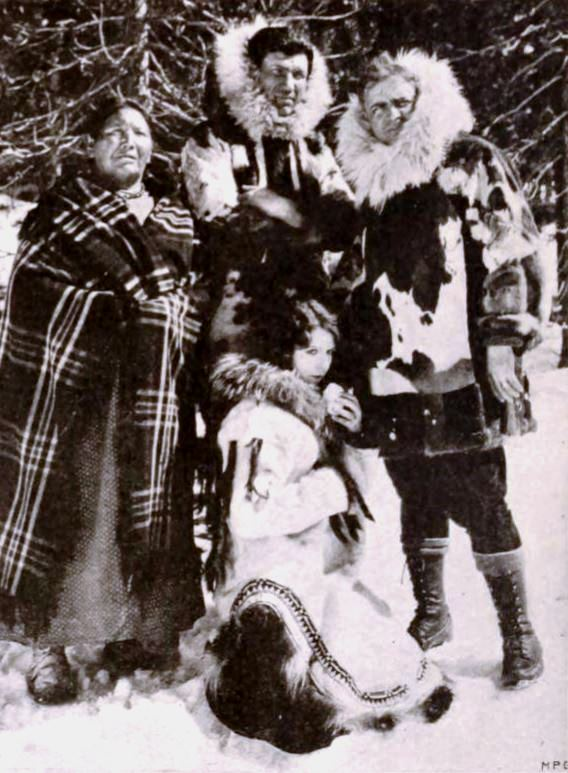
On the set of Burning Daylight (1920 film)

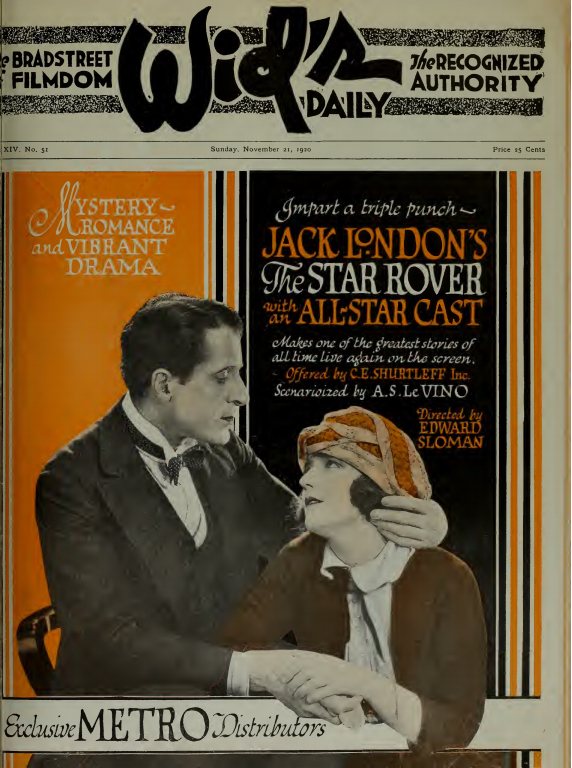
Ad for The Star Rover

Clarence E. Shurtleff was involved in the film business in the U.S. including as a producer for his namesake film company, C. E. Shurtleff, Inc.

In 1907, he held a finance position at a clothing mill in Chicago. He was a sales manager for Select pictures and W.W. Hodkinson's distribution company.

In 1920, he signed a 3-year contract for the film production rights to Peter B. Kyne's short stories. He also made a deal for the film rights to Jack London's stories.

== Filmography ==
- The Mutiny of the Elsinore (1920 film), directed by Edward Sloman
- Burning Daylight (1920 film)
- The Star Rover (1920)
