= Neptune's Daughter (1914 film) =

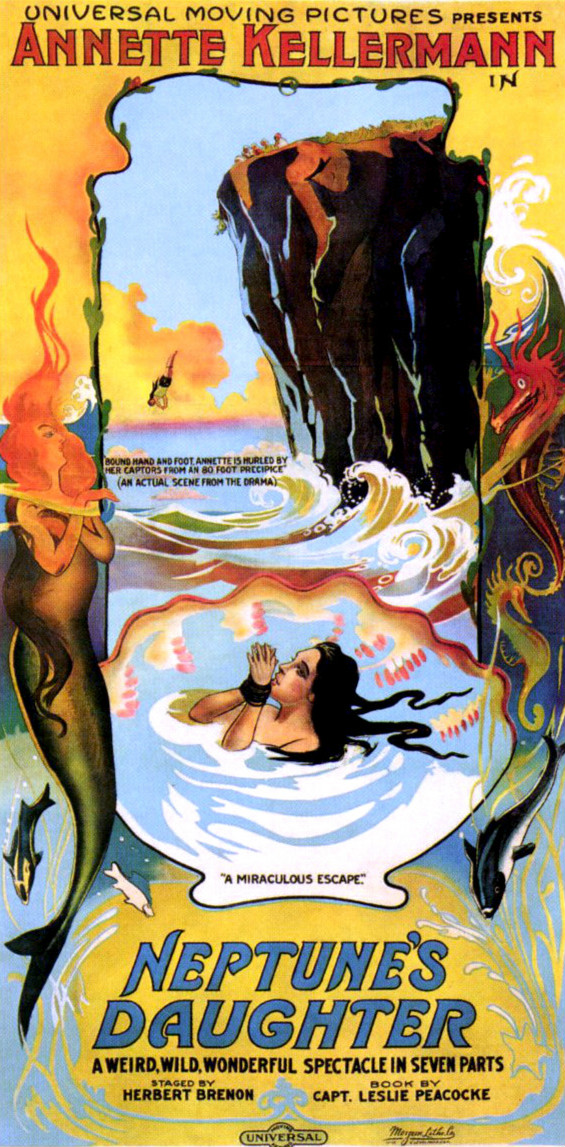
- Film poster
- Directed by: Herbert Brenon
- Written by: Leslie T. Peacocke
- Starring: Annette Kellerman
- Cinematography: André Barlatier (French Wikipedia)
- Production company: Universal Film Manufacturing Company
- Distributed by: Universal Film Manufacturing Company
- Release date: April 25, 1914
- Running time: 7 reels
- Country: United States
- Language: Silent (English intertitles)
- Budget: approximately $50,000
- Box office: $1 million

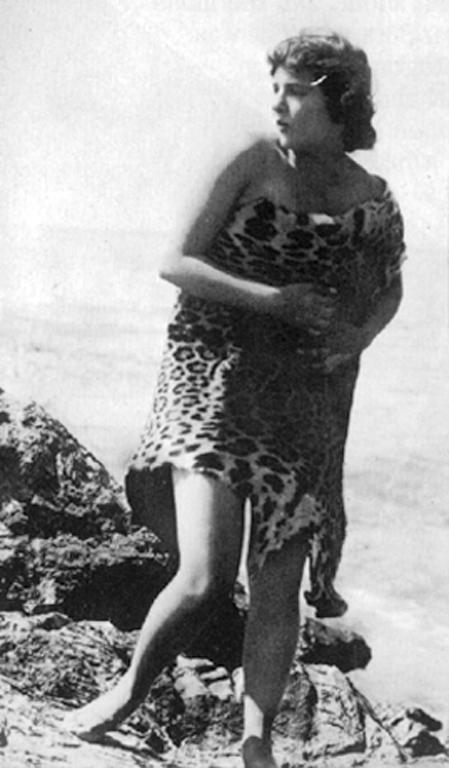
Annette Kellerman in the film.

Neptune's Daughter is a 1914 American silent fantasy film featuring the first collaboration between actress Annette Kellerman and director Herbert Brenon. It was based on Kellerman's idea of "a water fantasy movie with beautiful mermaids in King Neptune's garden together with a good love story." It was filmed by Universal in Bermuda during January and February, cost approximately $50,000 and grossed one million dollars at the box office.

== Plot ==
The daughter of the king of the water, King Neptune, takes on human form to avenge the death of her young sister, who was caught in a fishing net. However, she falls in love with the king of the land, King William, the man she holds responsible.

== Cast ==
- Annette Kellerman as Annette, Neptune's daughter
- William E. Shay as King William
- William Welsh as King Neptune
- Leah Baird as Princess Olga
- Mrs. Allen Walker as The Sea Witch
- Herbert Brenon as Roador the Wolf
- Edmund Mortimer as Duke Boris
- Lewis Hooper as Count Rudolph
- Millie Liston as Jailer's mother
- Katherine Lee as Angela, Annette's sister

== Reception ==
George Blaisdell, writing for The Moving Picture World after seeing a pre-release screening, gave the film a positive review, noting that "There is a wealth of incident in 'Neptune's Daughter.' The story of intrigue at court is convincing and well portrayed. The transition of Annette from the dominions of Father Neptune to the world of mortals and vice versa is so skillfully treated that it seems the perfectly natural course of events".

The film received renewed interest after 1916 when the popular A Daughter of the Gods was released, which also starred Kellerman and included a brief nudity scene.

== Preservation ==
One reel of Neptune's Daughter footage is currently held in two archives, the National Film and Sound Archive and Gosfilmofond of Russia. This can be found on the Venus of the South Seas Region 1 DVD release as an extra feature.

== See also ==
- List of incomplete or partially lost films
