= The Valley of the Moon (film) =

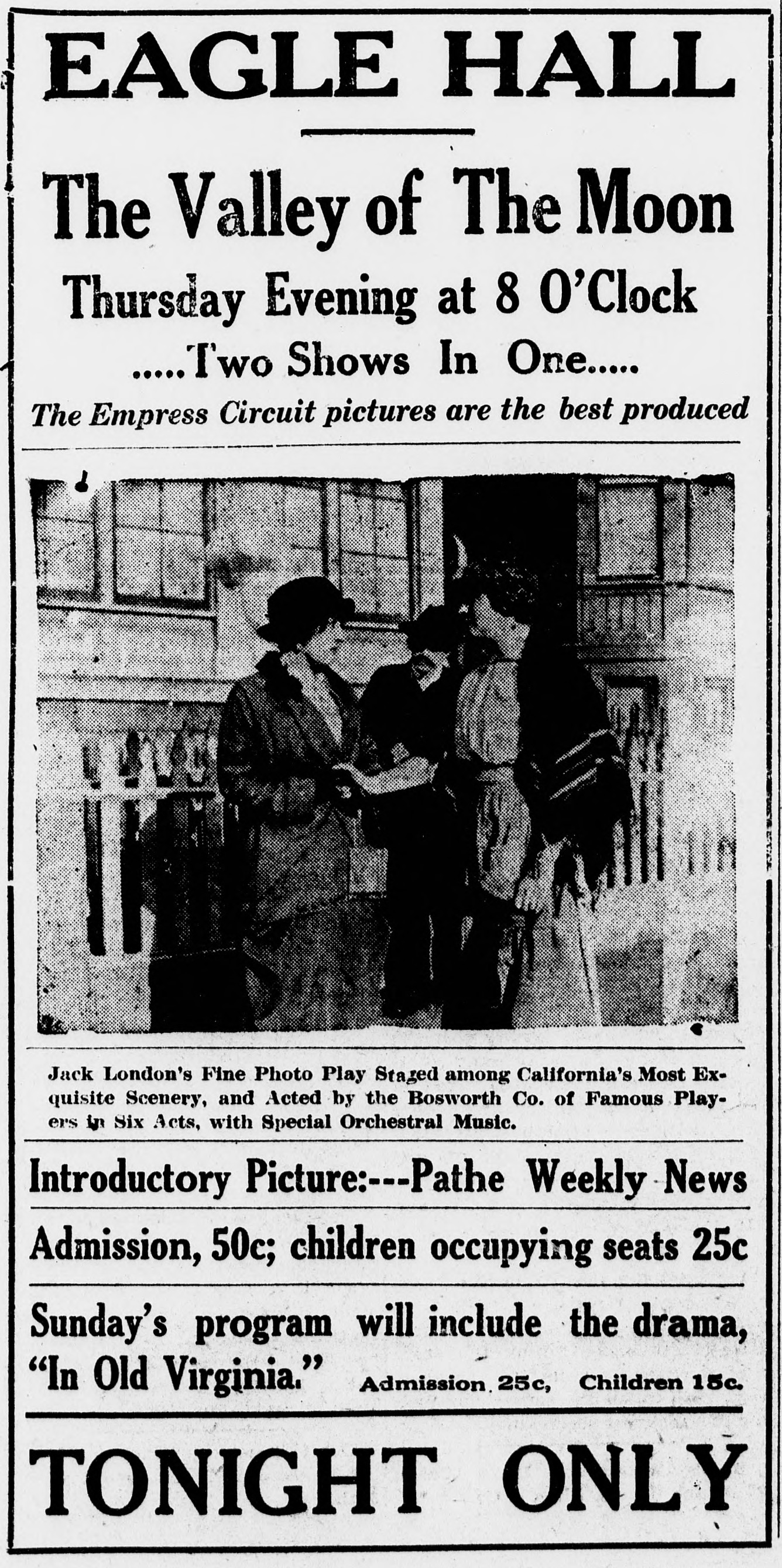
- Contemporary advertisement
- Directed by: Hobart Bosworth
- Written by: Hettie Gray Baker (scenario)
- Based on: The Valley of the Moon by Jack London
- Starring: Jack Conway; Myrtle Stedman
- Edited by: Hettie Gray Baker
- Release date: June 22, 1914
- Running time: Six reels
- Country: United States
- Language: Silent

The Valley of the Moon is a 1914 silent film directed by Hobart Bosworth and starring Jack Conway and Myrtle Stedman. Produced by Bosworth/London, it was an adaptation of the 1913 novel The Valley of the Moon by Jack London and based upon a scenario by Hettie Gray Baker.

Location shooting for the film took place on Catalina Island, Glen Ellen, Carmel, and San Francisco, California.

== Plot ==
When boxer Billy Roberts (Conway) marries laundress Saxon (Stedman), he tries to please his spouse by leaving his former profession behind and becoming a teamster driving trucks. However, when their wages are cut, the union calls for a strike. The film is sympathetic toward the strikers, with scenes showing police attacking the teamsters with clubs and patrol wagons being driven over fallen men. The former boxer is attacked and beaten by company scabs, lands in jail following a brawl, and starts drinking. The desperate couple decide to move to the country and start a new life on a farm. With money being tight, he enters a fight for a $300 prize. In the end he wins, and the couple depart to live at their "Valley of the Moon".

== Preservation ==
With no prints of The Valley of the Moon located in any film archives, it is considered a lost film.
