= Alice Charbonnet-Kellermann =

Australian composer (1858–1914)

- Charbonnet-Kellermann in 1889
- Born: Alice Ellen Laurentine Charbonnet; 12 December 1862; Cincinnati, Ohio, United States
- Died: 1 July 1914 (aged 51); 14th arrondissement, Paris, France
- Resting place: Père Lachaise Cemetery
- Occupations: Composer; pianist; music teacher
- Spouse: Frederick William Kellermann
- Children: Annette Kellerman
- Parent(s): Amable Charbonnet; Ellen Jackson

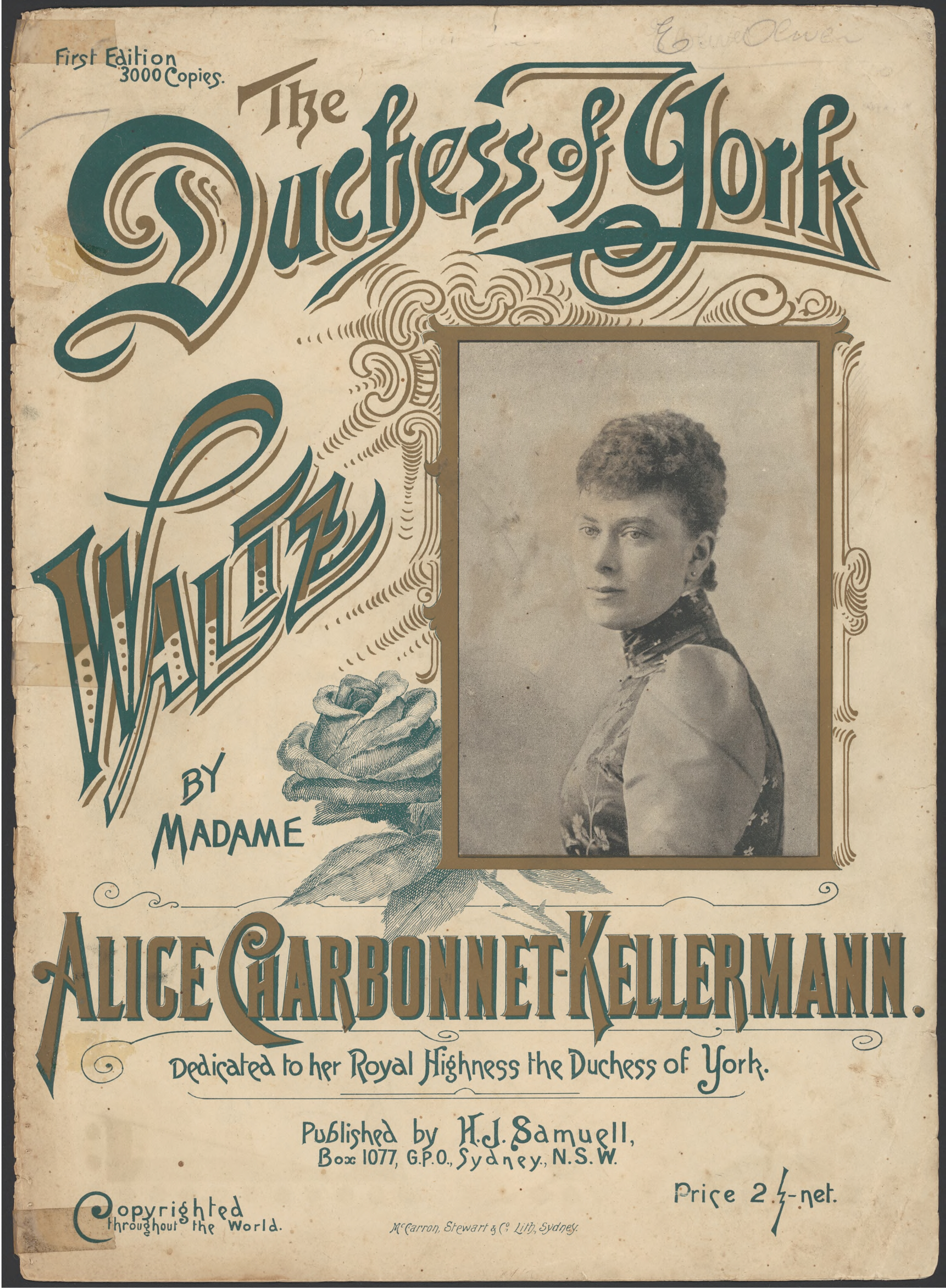
1897 cover art from "The Duchess of York" by Alice Charbonnet-Kellermann

Alice Ellen Laurentine Charbonnet (12 December 1862, Cincinnati, Ohio – 1 July 1914, 14th arrondissement, Paris, France), daughter of Amable Charbonnet and Ellen Jackson, was an Australian composer of romantic and classical music. Her father was a French judge, and her formative years were spent in a variety of countries. She married violinist Frederick William Kellermann; their daughter Annette Kellermann was a long-distance swimmer, vaudeville entertainer, film actress, and educator.

Alice and Frederick established a music school in Phillip Street, Sydney, and Alice became a distinguished figure on Sydney's concert scene. She gave many afternoon recitals at gatherings at Phillip Street and at her home in Potts Point, and appeared in many larger concerts. After moving to Melbourne in 1901 without her husband, Alice became a music teacher at Simpson's School, Mentone, where she commanded a high fees because of her experience and the high results she obtained with students. In 1907 she retired to Paris, but continued giving concerts.

She is buried in Père Lachaise cemetery in Paris.

Her piano students included Dame Nellie Melba, composer Lydia Larner and May Summerbelle

== Works ==
- 1892 Saltarella in A minor
- 1898 Le train du diable, galop de concert
- Ye Olde English Dances
- Tarantella
- Mappari
- Brise de mer
- Remembrance, song
- Danse Mexicaine
- Ave Maria, for solo voice, violin and piano or organ
