= Burning Daylight: The Adventures of 'Burning Daylight' in Civilization =

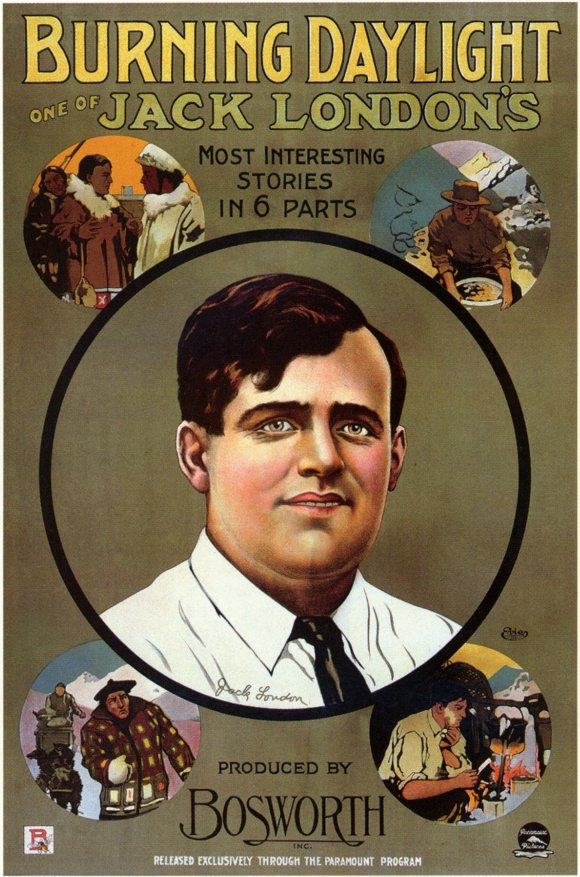
- Film poster
- Directed by: Hobart Bosworth
- Screenplay by: Hettie Grey Baker
- Based on: Burning Daylight by Jack London
- Starring: Hobart Bosworth; Myrtle Stedman
- Cinematography: George W. Hill
- Production company: Hobart Bosworth Productions
- Distributed by: Paramount Pictures
- Release date: October 1914
- Running time: 57 minutes
- Country: United States
- Language: English

Burning Daylight: The Adventures of 'Burning Daylight' in Civilization is a 1914 American adventure film directed by Hobart Bosworth, starring Hobart Bosworth and Myrtle Stedman. It is based on the 1910 novel Burning Daylight by Jack London. The film was released in October 1914, by Paramount Pictures.

Location shooting for the film took place in Truckee, California.

== Cast ==
- Hobart Bosworth as Elam Harnish
- Myrtle Stedman as Dede Mason

== Preservation ==
With no prints of Burning Daylight located in any film archives, it is considered a lost film.
