= A Daughter of the Gods =

1916 film by Herbert Brenon

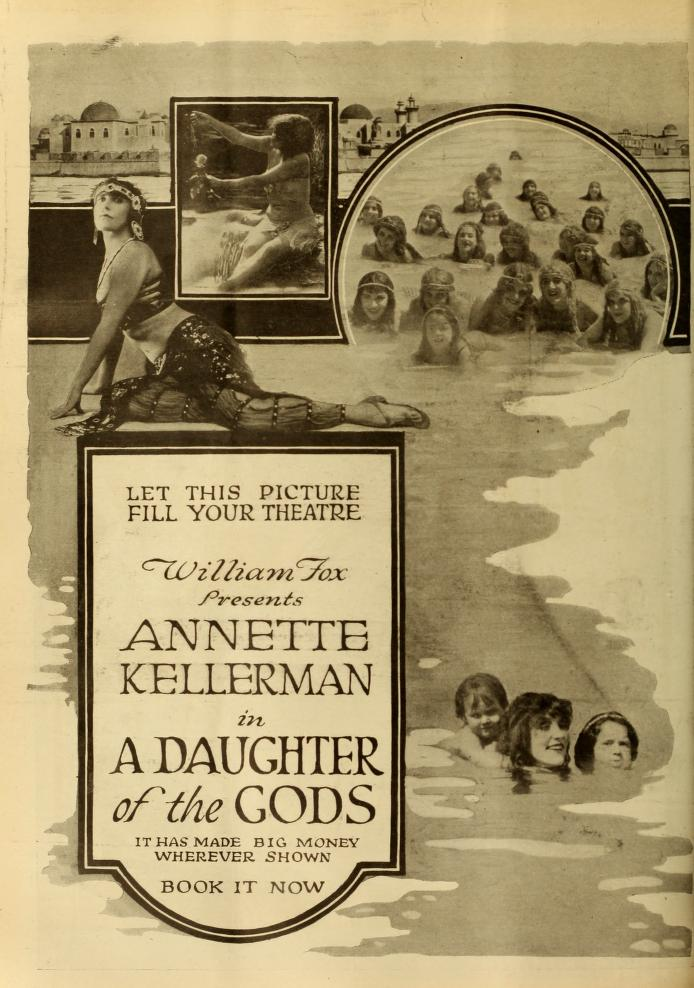
- Directed by: Herbert Brenon
- Written by: Herbert Brenon
- Produced by: William Fox
- Starring: Annette Kellerman; William E. Shay; Hal De Forrest
- Cinematography: André Barlatier; A. Culp; J. Roy Hunt; William Marshall; C. Richards; Marcel Le Picard; Edward Warren
- Edited by: Hettie Gray Baker
- Music by: Robert Hood Bowers
- Distributed by: Fox Film Corporation
- Release date: October 17, 1916
- Running time: 180 mins.
- Country: United States
- Language: Silent (English intertitles)
- Budget: $850,000–1.1 million
- Box office: $1.39 million

A Daughter of the Gods is a 1916 American silent fantasy drama film written and directed by Herbert Brenon. The film was controversial because it includes the first complete nude scene by a major star, Australian swimming star Annette Kellermann, though most of her body is covered by her long hair. It was filmed by Fox Film Corporation in Kingston, Jamaica, where huge sets were constructed. It is also sometimes noted as the first film to have a production budget of $1 million.

== Background ==
Brenon wrote the film's scenario and screenplay for the film, but was likely influenced by the 1902 Broadway play The Darling of the Gods, which has a similar theme of reward for rescuing a child and a large ensemble cast, The play was produced by David Belasco and John Luther Long and starred Blanche Bates, Robert T. Haines, and young George Arliss. The play differs in that it is set in feudal Japan while the movie is backdropped in an undersea kingdom, not unlike Atlantis.

Brenon made aspects of the play cinematic (underwater sequences, Kellerman's nudity, etc.) in an obvious effort to avoid charges of plagiarism of Belasco's play and hence a lawsuit.

== Plot ==
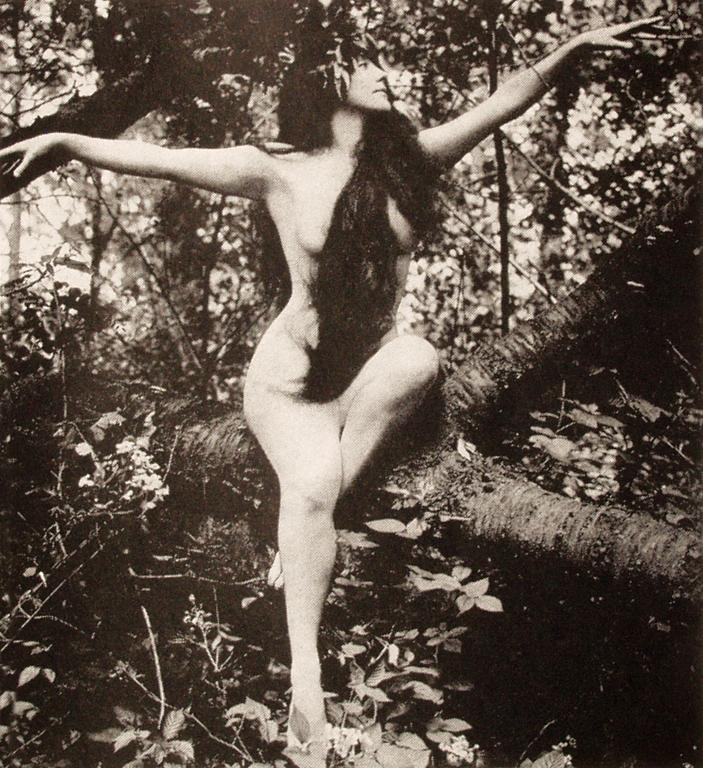
A film still of star Annette Kellerman

A sultan agrees to help an evil witch destroy a mysterious beauty if the witch will bring his young son back to life.

== Cast ==
- Annette Kellerman as Anitia, Daughter of The Gods
- William E. Shay as Prince Omar (credited as William Shay)
- Hal De Forrest as The Sultan
- Marcelle Hontabat as Celine
- Violet Horner as Zarrah
- Jane Lee as Little Prince Omar
- Stuart Holmes as Moorish Merchant
- Katherine Lee as Nydia
- Ricca Allen as Witch of Badness
- Millie Liston as Zarrah's mother (credited as Milly Liston)
- Henrietta Gilbert as Fairy of Goodness
- Walter James as Chief Eunuch
- Walter McCollough as Chief of The Sultan's Guard
- Mark Price as The Slave Dealer
- Louise Rial as His Wife
- Edward Boring as Arab Sheik
- Barbara Castleton

== Production ==
After receiving the film assignment with its budget limit of $1 million, director Brenon visited the Metropolitan Museum of Art in New York City, where he was inspired by paintings such as A Dream of the Arabian Nights by Villegas. The opening scene of the film was claimed to be a composite of Cabanel's The Birth of Venus and Coypel's Venus Frolicking in the Sea with Nymphs.

The film is credited as the first US production to cost at least $1 million ($19.9 million in 2024) to produce, with actual costs just exceeding $1.1 million ($21.8 million in 2024). Studio head William Fox was so incensed with the cost of production he removed Herbert Brenon's name from the film. However, Brenon sued to have his name restored to the film's credits, and won. Advertising for the film would often note its million-dollar cost.

Great cost was afforded to make a sanitary of mosquito-proofing over a section of Kingston, Jamaica. Sets consumed 2,500 barrels (400 m^{3}) of plaster, 500 barrels (79 m^{3}) of cement, 2,000,000 board feet (5,000 m^{3}) of lumber, and ten tons of paper. Director Herbert Brenon employed 20,000 people during the eight months of production and used 220,000 feet (67,000 m) of film to shoot the picture. The Moorish city cost $350,000 ($6.95 million in 2024) to build, and was destroyed in one climactic scene. The total number of persons appearing in it was 21,218, which included 200 mermaids, and 300 dancing girls and women of the Sultan's harem. The 100 women recruited from the US and Europe to portray nymphs underwent weeks of training by Kellerman to swim using a single stroke in unison and to avoid unnecessary splashing.

Robert Hood Bowers composed the film's score, which was played by an orchestra during each screening. It was considered the most memorable film score up to that time.

== Reception ==
The film-censorship boards in the United States and Canada and the National Board of Review passed the film in spite of its brief nudity scene, calling it artistic. Fox made general distribution of the film for the 1916 December holiday season.

On December 18, 1916, President Wilson and his wife celebrated their first wedding anniversary by attending the film's showing at the Belasco Theatre in Washington, D.C. It was the first film they viewed outside of the White House.

It reportedly made a net profit of $1.35 million.

== Preservation ==
No prints of A Daughter of the Gods are known to exist. It is considered a lost film.

== See also ==
- List of lost films
- 1937 Fox vault fire
