= Burning Daylight =

1910 novel by Jack London

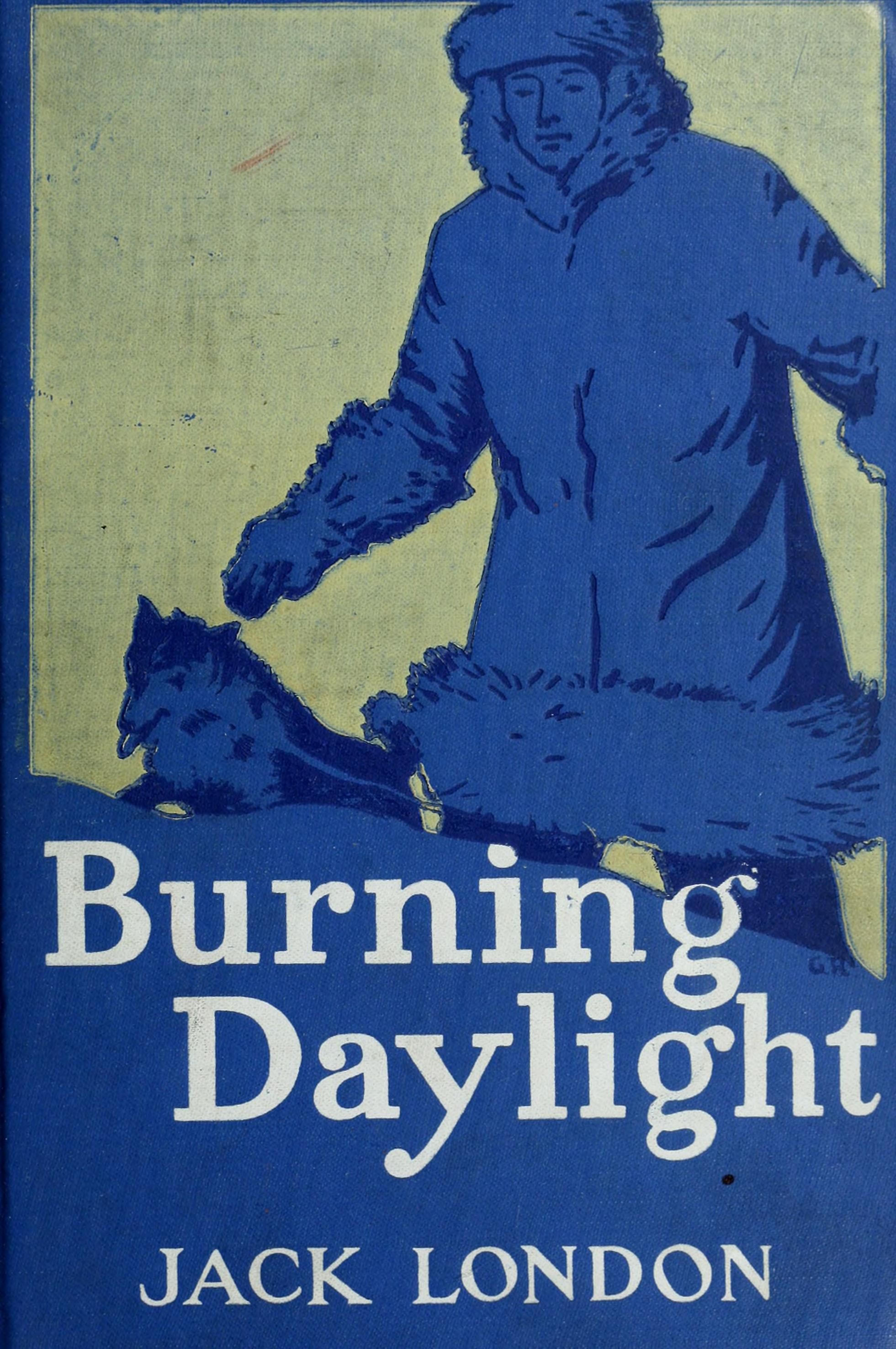
- First edition cover
- Author: Jack London
- Publisher: Macmillan Publishers (United States)
- Publication date: 1910

Burning Daylight is a novel by Jack London, published in 1910, one of the best-selling books of that year and London's best-selling book in his lifetime. The novel has been adapted for film.

== Plot ==
The first part of the novel takes place in the Yukon Territory in 1893 and in Alaska. The second part of the novel takes place in San Francisco and the San Francisco Bay Area. "Burning Daylight", the main character, is partially based upon the life of Oakland entrepreneur "Borax" Smith, but named for Elam Harnish (1866-1941).

== Distribution ==
In 1910, the New York Herald published the novel serially, later that year, Macmillan published the novel as a book.

== Etymology ==
Shakespeare uses "burning daylight" in Romeo and Juliet and The Merry Wives of Windsor.

The phrase means "spending time uselessly", something that the main character was expressly against, and tried to live his life to the fullest.

== American film adaptations ==
- Burning Daylight: The Adventures of 'Burning Daylight' in Alaska (1914)
- Burning Daylight: The Adventures of 'Burning Daylight' in Civilization (1914)
- Burning Daylight (1920 film)
- Burning Daylight (1928 film)

== Canadian film adaptation ==
- Burning Daylight (2010)

The film, set in New York City, shot entirely in and around Toronto, starring Robert Knepper, was produced and directed by Kazakhstani-Canadian Sanzhar Sultanov. This version, based on two short stories and the novel, concentrated on the second half of the book, " in Civilization". The film had a Jack London Foundation benefit preview screening on August 9, 2010 at the Sebastiani Theater in Jack London's late-life hometown of Sonoma, California.

== USSR (Russia) film adaptation ==
- Time-does-not-wait (Russian) Time-does-not-wait (1975)

== Reception ==
Some critics see Burning Daylight not a novel but a series of short stories.
