= Annette Kellerman =

Australian swimmer, vaudeville star, film actress and writer (1886–1975)

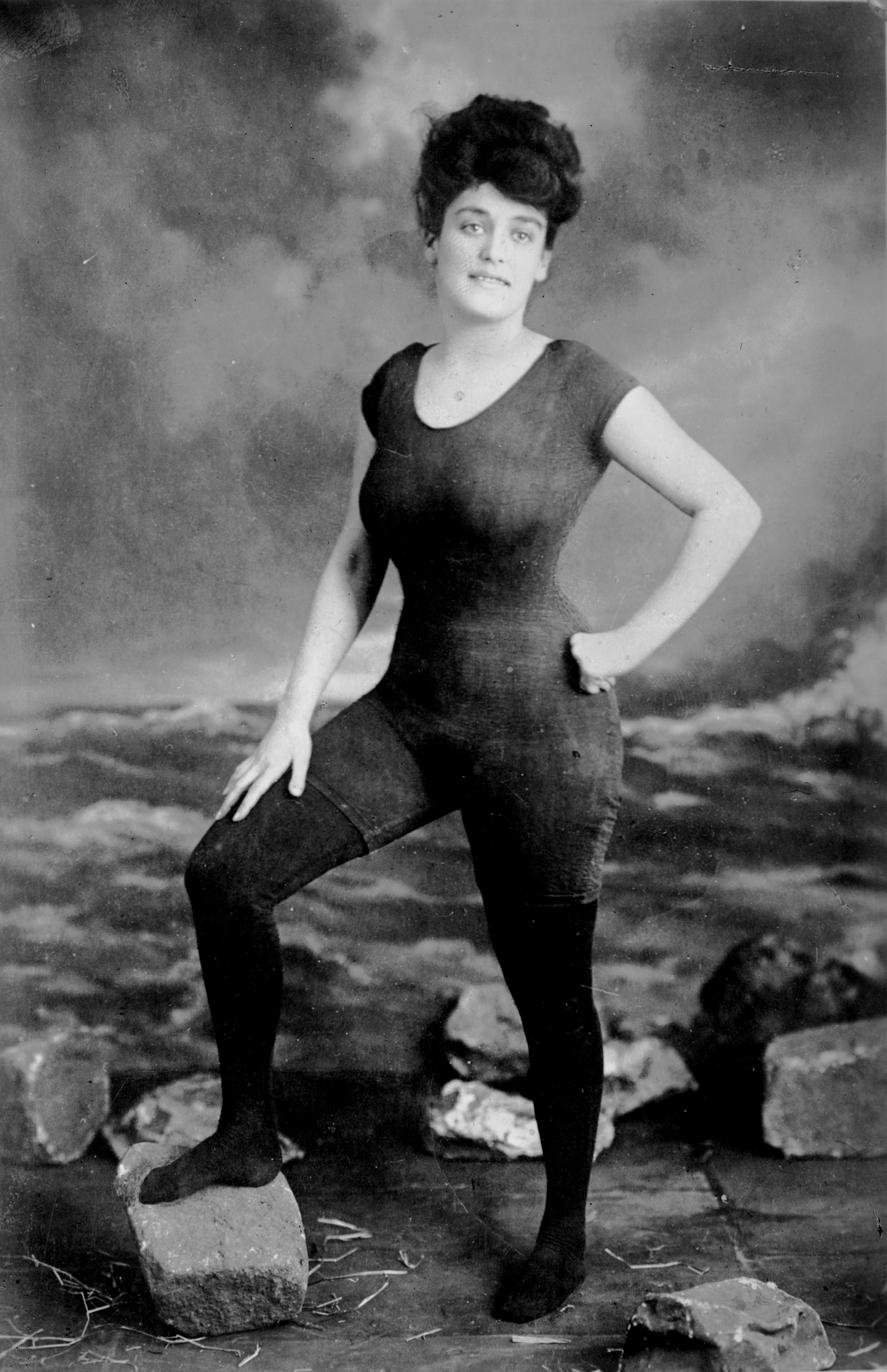
- Kellermann in a one-piece bathing suit in 1906
- Born: Annette Marie Sarah Kellermann; 6 July 1886; Darlinghurst, New South Wales, Australia
- Died: 6 November 1975 (aged 89); Southport, Queensland, Australia
- Resting place: Great Barrier Reef
- Occupations: Swimmer, actress, writer
- Known for: Swimmer, actress, writer, Inventor of Synchronised Swimming, Pioneer of women's swimwear
- Spouse: James Raymond Louis Sullivan (m. 1912–1972)
- Parent(s): Alice Charbonnet-Kellermann; Frederick William Kellermann
- Honours: Victorian Honour Roll of Women, 2001

Annette Marie Sarah Kellermann (6 July 1886 – 6 November 1975) was an Australian professional swimmer, vaudeville star, film actress, and writer, usually spelt with a single final n as Annette Kellerman.

Kellermann was one of the first women to wear a one-piece bathing costume, instead of the then-accepted pantaloons, and inspired others to follow her example. Kellerman's swimming costumes became so popular that she started her own fashion line of one-piece bathing suits. Kellermann helped popularise the sport of synchronised swimming, and authored a swimming manual. She appeared in several movies, usually with aquatic themes, and as the star of the 1916 film A Daughter of the Gods was the first major actress to appear nude in a Hollywood production. Kellermann was an advocate of health, fitness, and natural beauty throughout her life.

== Early life ==
Annette Kellermann was born in Darlinghurst, New South Wales, Australia, on 6 July 1886, to Australian-born violinist Frederick William Kellermann, and his French wife, Alice Ellen Charbonnet, a pianist and music teacher.

At the age of six, a weakness in Kellermann's legs necessitated the wearing of steel braces to strengthen them. To further overcome her disability, her parents enrolled her in swimming classes at Cavill's Baths, a tidal swimming pool in the North Sydney suburb of Lavender Bay. By the age of 13, her legs were practically normal, and by 15, she had mastered all the swimming strokes and won her first race. At this time she was also giving diving displays.

== Swimming career ==
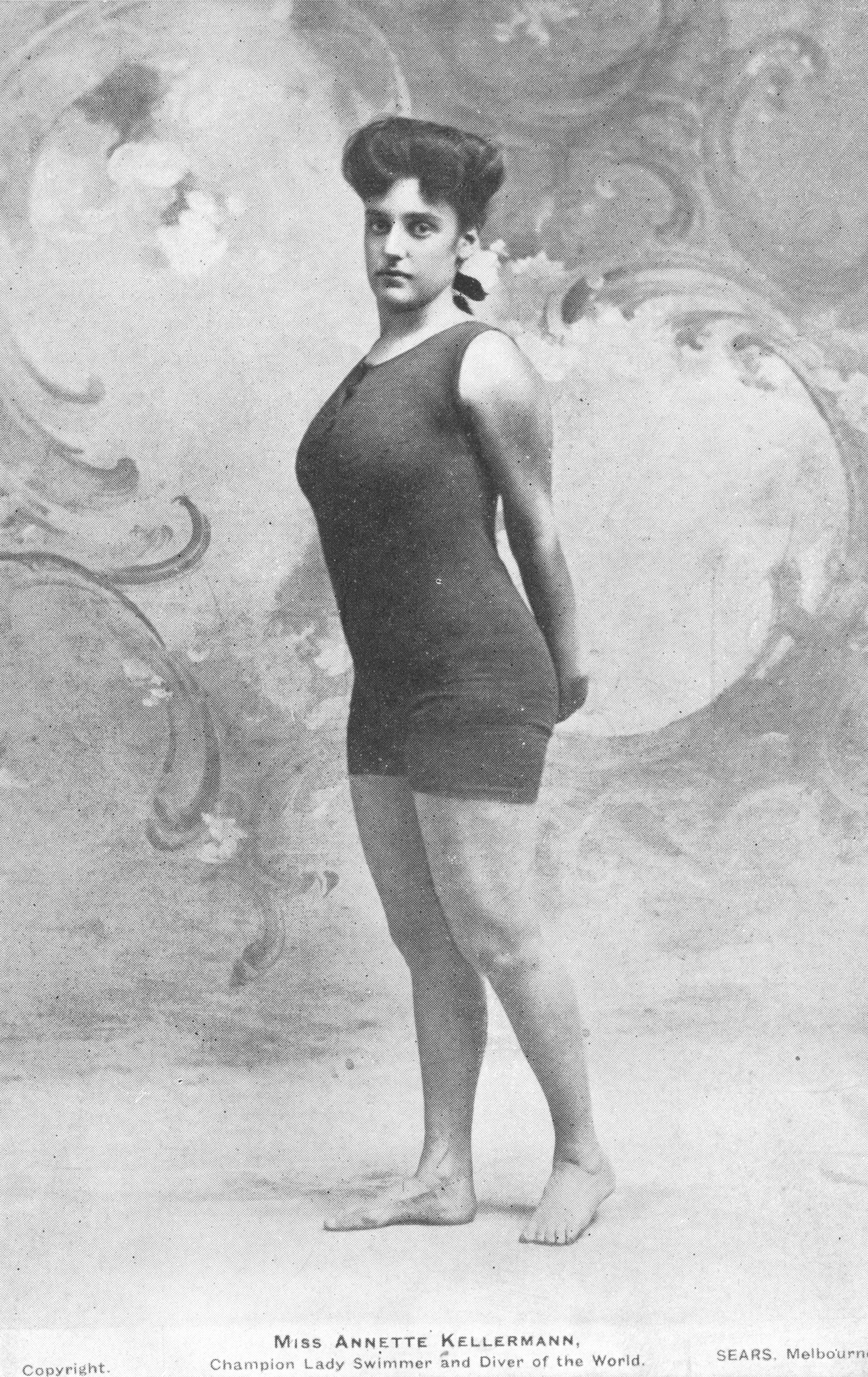
Kellermann in 1910

In 1902, Kellermann won the ladies' 100 yards and mile championships of New South Wales in the record times of 1 minute, 22 seconds and 33 minutes, 49 seconds respectively. In that same year, her parents decided to move to Melbourne, Victoria, and she was enrolled at Mentone Girls' Grammar School, where her mother had accepted a music teaching position.

During her time at school, Kellermann gave exhibitions of swimming and diving at the main Melbourne baths, performed a mermaid act at Princes Court entertainment centre, and did two shows a day swimming with fish in a glass tank at the Exhibition Aquarium. In June and July 1903, she performed sensational high dives in the Coogee scene of Bland Holt's spectacular, The Breaking of the Drought, at the Melbourne Theatre Royal.

Kellermann and Beatrice Kerr, who was billed as "Australia's Champion Lady Swimmer and Diver", were rivals, although Kerr's public challenges to Kellermann to meet in a competitive race went unanswered.

On 24 August 1905, aged 19, Kellermann was one of the first women to attempt to swim across the English Channel. A Dover ship pilot said Kellermann was not permitted to swim any further on her attempts, despite his opinion being that she could have kept going for much longer. After three unsuccessful swims she declared, "I had the endurance but not the brute strength." The first woman to attempt a Channel crossing had been Austrian Baroness Walburga von Isacescu, in September 1900. She had made a previous effort the month before alongside Ted Heaton, but had to leave the water several miles out in the channel due to sea-sickness. Kellermann later challenged and defeated von Isacescu in a Danube race.

While in London a short film was shot of her performances and shown in Australian venues.

In 1911, she appeared on Broadway in the title role of "Undine", an aquacade specialty conceived by composer Manuel Klein and performed in repertory with the popular musical Vera Violetta that featured Al Jolson.

Kellermann performed a water ballet in a glass tank at the New York Hippodrome in 1917.

== Swimwear line ==
Kellermann advocated for the right of women to wear a one-piece bathing suit, which was controversial at the time. According to an Australian magazine, "In the early 1900s, women were expected to wear cumbersome dress and pantaloon combinations when swimming." Although Kellermann later claimed to have been arrested at Revere Beach for public indecency while wearing one of her suits, there are no contemporary police records or news stories corroborating this, and she appears to have invented the incident.

The popularity of her one-piece suits resulted in her own line of women's swimwear. The "Annette Kellermans", as they were known, were the first step towards modern women's swimwear.

== Film career ==
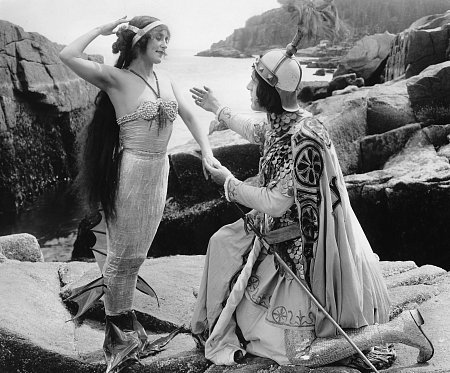
Kellermann and Hugh Thompson in Queen of the Sea

In 1916, Kellermann became the first major actress to perform in a nude scene when she appeared fully nude in A Daughter of the Gods. Made by Fox Film Corporation, A Daughter of the Gods was the first million-dollar film production. Like many of Kellermann's other films, it is considered a lost film, as no copies are known to exist.

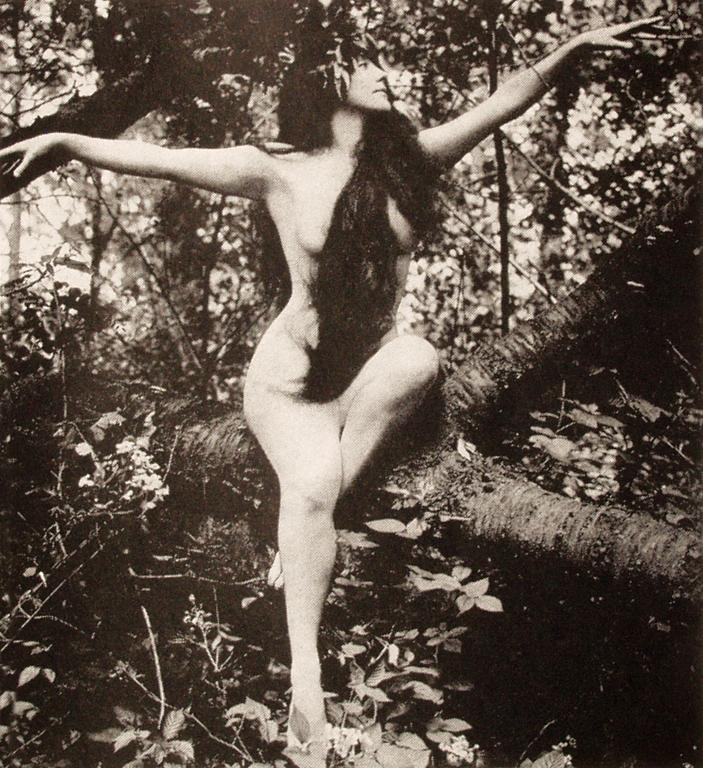
Kellermann in a nude scene from A Daughter of the Gods (1916)

The majority of Kellermann's films had themes of aquatic adventure. She performed her own stunts including diving from 92 feet (28 m) into the sea and 60 feet (18 m) into a pool of crocodiles. Many times she would play mermaids named Annette or variations of her own name. Her "fairy tale films", as she called them, started with The Mermaid (1911), in which she was the first actress to wear a swimmable mermaid costume on film, paving the way for future screen sirens such as Esther Williams, Glynis Johns (Miranda, 1948), Ann Blyth (Mr. Peabody and the Mermaid, 1948) and Daryl Hannah (Splash, 1984). Kellermann designed her own mermaid swimming costumes and sometimes made them herself. Similar designs are still used by the Weeki Wachee Springs Mermaids, including her aquatic fairy costume first introduced in Queen of the Sea (1918, another lost film).

Kellermann appeared in one of the last films made in Prizma Color, Venus of the South Seas (1924), a US/New Zealand co-production with one reel of the 55-minute film in colour and underwater. Venus of the South Seas was restored by the Library of Congress in 2004 and is the only complete feature film starring Kellermann known to exist.

== Publications ==
In addition to her film and stage career, Kellermann wrote several books including How to Swim (1918), Physical Beauty: How to Keep It (1919), a book of children's stories titled Fairy Tales of the South Seas (1926), and My Story, an unpublished autobiography. She also wrote numerous mail order booklets on health, beauty, and fitness called The Body Beautiful.

== Personal life ==
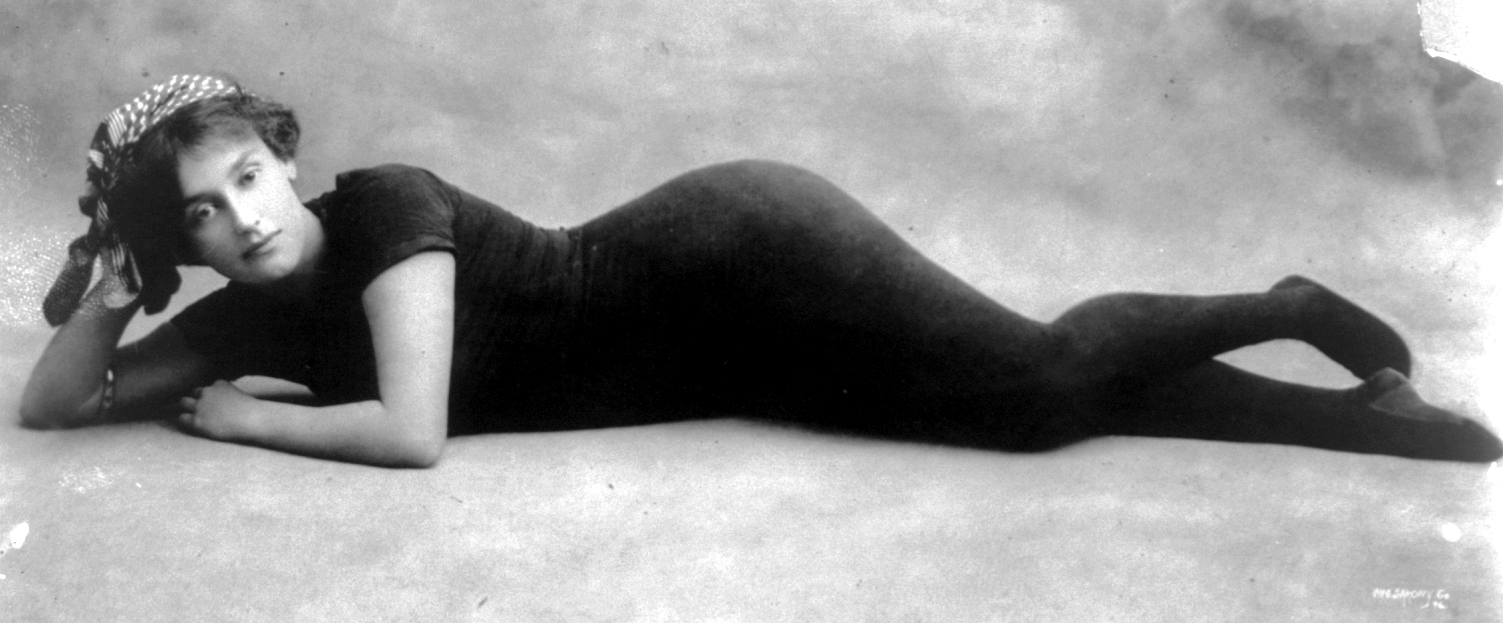
Kellermann in her full-length swimwear

Kellermann married her American-born manager, James Sullivan, on or around 26 November 1912 at Danbury, Connecticut.

A life-long vegetarian, later in life Kellermann owned a health food store in Long Beach, California. She remained active well into old age, continuing to swim and exercise until a short time before her death. She and her husband returned to live in Australia in 1970, and in 1974, she was honoured by the International Swimming Hall of Fame at Fort Lauderdale, Florida.

Kellermann outlived her husband and died in the hospital at Southport, Queensland, Australia, on 6 November 1975, aged 89. She was cremated with Roman Catholic rites. Her remains were scattered in the Great Barrier Reef. She had no children.

== Legacy ==
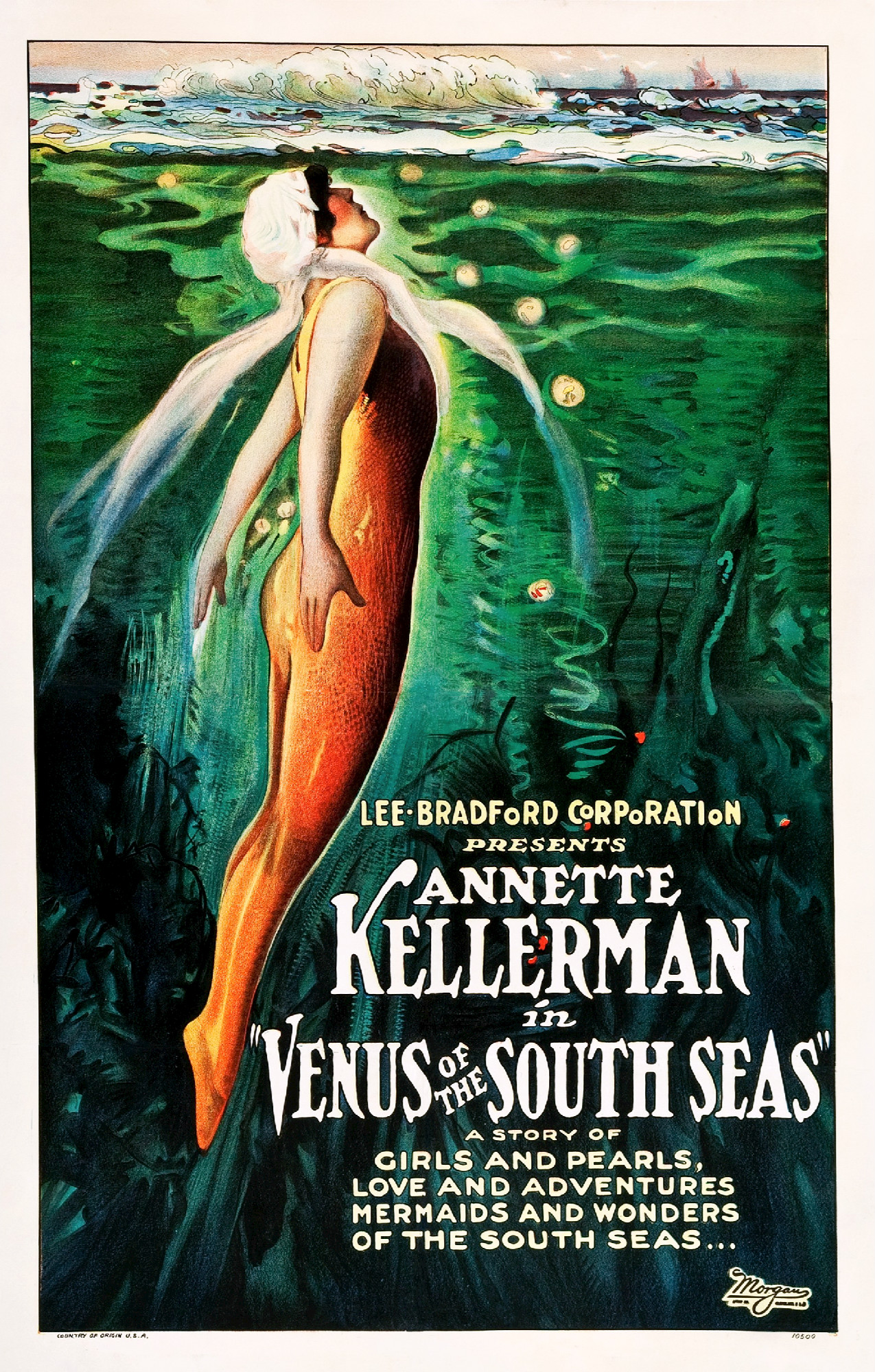
Venus of the South Seas poster

In 1908, after a study of 3,000 women, Dudley A. Sargent of Harvard University dubbed Kellerman the "Perfect Woman" because of the similarity of her physical attributes to the Venus de Milo. During her Fox film series, she was often billed as 'Australia's Perfect Woman.'

Kellermann's large collection of costumes and theatrical memorabilia was bequeathed to the Sydney Opera House. Today, many of her original costumes and personal items are held by the Powerhouse Museum in Sydney, Australia.

The Mitchell collection, State Library of New South Wales holds Kellerman's archive of personal papers.

The American thoroughbred mare Annette K. (foaled in 1921 out of the mare Bathing Girl) was named after her. Annette K. became the grandam of U.S. Triple Crown winner War Admiral.

Kellerman was portrayed by Esther Williams in the film Million Dollar Mermaid (1952), and her name is on a star on the Hollywood Walk of Fame, on Hollywood Boulevard. The Original Mermaid, an award-winning Australian documentary about Kellermann, was released in 2002.

A swimming complex which opened in December 2010 in Marrickville, New South Wales, Australia is named after her.

The streets in the suburb of Holt in the Australian capital Canberra are all named after Australian sportspeople, and Kellermann Close was named for her.

In 2016, X Swimwear, a made-to-measure swimwear line, launched a custom swimsuit called "The Kellerman" after her.

For her efforts advocating for women's swimming and bathing suit reform, Kellerman has been described as a swimming suffragist.

== Filmography ==
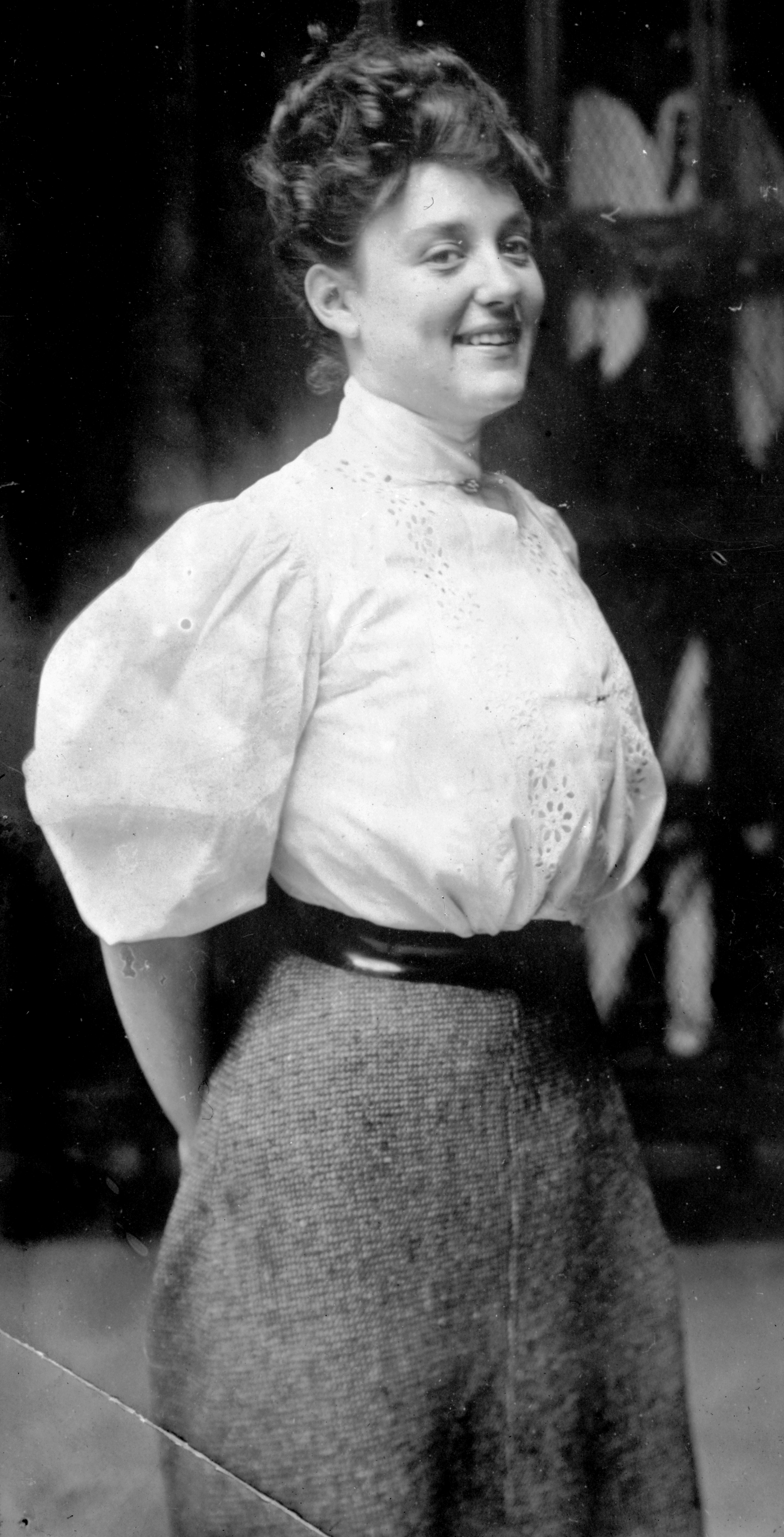
Kellermann photographed in the United States, 1907

- The Bride of Lammermoor: A Tragedy of Bonnie Scotland (1909, Short)
- Jephtah's Daughter: A Biblical Tragedy (1909, Short) - Jepthah's Daughter
- The Gift of Youth (1909, Short)
- Entombed Alive (1909, Short)
- The Mermaid (1911, Short) - Mermaid
- Siren of the Sea (1911, Short) - Siren of the Sea
- Neptune's Daughter (1914) - Annette, Neptune's daughter
- A Daughter of the Gods (1916) - Anitia - Daughter of the Gods
- National Red Cross Pageant (1917) - The Mediterranean - Italian episode
- Queen of the Sea (1918) - Merrilla, Queen of the Sea
- What Women Love (1920) - Annabel Cotton
- Venus of the South Seas (1924) - Shona Royale (final film role)

=== As herself ===
- Miss Kellerman's Diving Feats (1907, Documentary short)
- Miss Annette Kellerman (1909, Documentary short)
- The Perfectly Formed Woman (1910, Short)
- The Universal Boy (1914)
- The Art of Diving (1920, Documentary short)
- Annette Kellermann Performing Water Ballet (1925, Documentary short)
- Annette Kellermann Returns to Australia (1933, Documentary short)
- Water Ballet: Sydney (1940, Short)
- Water Ballet (1941, Short)

=== Archival footage ===
- The Love Goddesses (1965)
- The Original Mermaid (2002)

Annette Kellerman in a clip from the 1924 film Venus of the South Seas

== Books ==
- How to Swim
- Physical Beauty, How to Keep It

== See also ==
- List of members of the International Swimming Hall of Fame
