= Burning Daylight (1928 film) =

1928 film by Charles Brabin

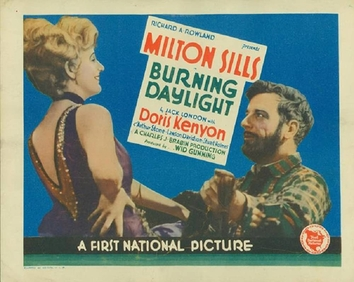
- Lobby card
- Directed by: Charles Brabin
- Written by: Louis Stevens
- Based on: Burning Daylight by Jack London
- Produced by: Wid Gunning; Richard A. Rowland; First National Pictures
- Starring: Milton Sills; Doris Kenyon
- Cinematography: Sol Polito
- Edited by: Frank Ware
- Production company: First National Pictures
- Distributed by: First National Pictures
- Release date: March 11, 1928
- Running time: 72 minutes
- Country: United States
- Languages: Silent; English titles

Burning Daylight is a 1928 silent dramatic action adventure film directed by Charles Brabin and starring Milton Sills and Doris Kenyon, a real-life married couple. It was produced and distributed by First National Pictures and based on the 1910 novel of the same name by Jack London. It was previously filmed by Metro Pictures in 1920.

== Cast ==
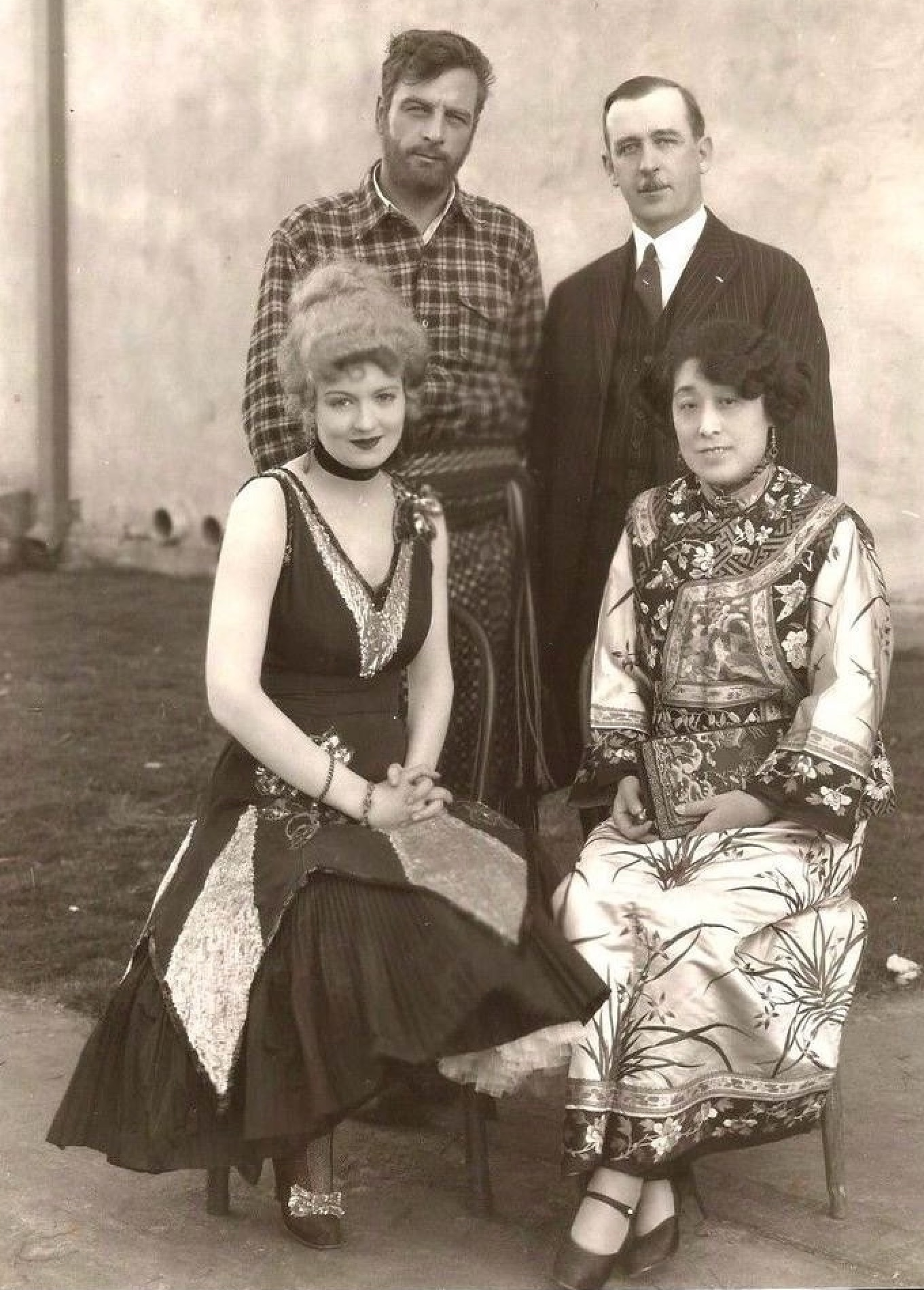
Milton Sills and Doris Kenyon during the filming of Burning Daylight, with their guests Lizzie Yu Der Ling and her husband Thaddeus White.

- Milton Sills as Burning Daylight
- Doris Kenyon as 'The Virgin'
- Arthur Stone as 'French Louie'
- Guinn "Big Boy" Williams as 'English Harry'
- Lawford Davidson as Morton
- Jane Winton as Martha Fairbee
- Stuart Holmes as Blake
- Edmund Breese as John Dossett
- Howard Truesdale as Letton
- Frank Hagney as Johnson
- Harry Northrup as The Stranger

== Preservation status ==
- The film is preserved in the Library of Congress collection. The film is also available on the DVD format.
