= Arthur Thalasso =

American actor (1883–1954)

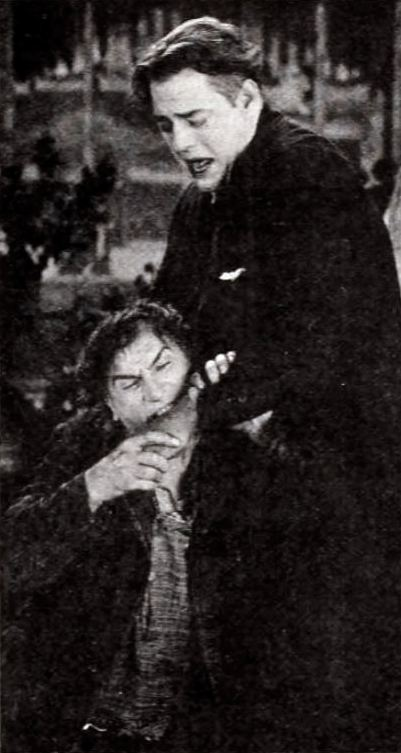
- Still from The Sign of the Rose (1922) with George Beban and Arthur Thalasso
- Born: November 26, 1883; Cincinnati, Ohio, US
- Died: February 13, 1954 (aged 70); Torrance, California, US
- Years active: 1919–1945

Arthur Thalasso (November 26, 1883 – February 13, 1954) was an American stage actor of vaudeville and musical comedy in the 1910s and, subsequently, a screen actor. He appeared in more than 70 films between 1919 and 1945. He was born the son of German immigrants Frank Thalasso (1852-1895) and Pauline Thalasso (1848-1919) in Cincinnati, Ohio, and died at Harbor General Hospital in Torrance, California.

== Selected filmography ==
- La La Lucille (1920) - Janitor
- The Forbidden Thing (1920) - Joe Portega
- The Kid (1921) - Car Thief with gun (uncredited)
- Children of Darkness (1921) - Vance
- Little Lord Fauntleroy (1921) - The Stranger
- The Sign of the Rose (1922) - Detective Lynch
- Black Gold (1924) - Tim Endicott
- Wine (1924) - Amoti
- Secrets of the Night (1924) - Detective Reardon (uncredited)
- The Movies (1925, Short) - The Villain - Bull Buckley
- The Strong Man (1926) - 'Zandow the Great'
- The Buckaroo Kid (1926) - Bodyguard (uncredited)
- Venus of Venice (1927) - Ludvico
- Horse Shoes (1927) - Conductor
- Speedy Smith (1927) - James Mortimer Dorfee
- Three's a Crowd (1927) - Harry's Boss
- A Perfect Gentleman (1928) - Ship's Officer
- Top Sergeant Mulligan (1928)
- Out with the Tide (1928) - Clancey
- Into the Night (1928) - Pat Shannon
- The Avenging Rider (1928) - Dance professor
- Air Police (1931) - Panama Joe
- The Secret Six (1931) - Stockyard Worker (uncredited)
- The Cheyenne Cyclone (1931) - Hoffman - Hotel Manager (uncredited)
- The Impatient Maiden (1932) - Neighbor (uncredited)
- Two-Fisted Law (1932) - Jake - Bartender (uncredited)
- The Reckless Rider (1932) - Bartender
- My Pal, the King (1932) - Council Member (uncredited)
- Trapped in Tia Juana (1932) - Billy - Bank Guard
- Lucky Larrigan (1932) - Bartender (uncredited)
- The Fugitive (1933) - Courtroom Attendant (uncredited)
- Her Forgotten Past (1933) - Police Detective (uncredited)
- Secret Sinners (1933) - Policeman (uncredited)
- The Kennel Murder Case (1933) - Detective (uncredited)
- Viva Villa! (1934) - Butcher (uncredited)
- Burn 'Em Up Barnes (1934, Serial) - Detective [Ch. 5, 10] (uncredited)
- Blind Date (1934) - Man at Gate (uncredited)
- The Moonstone (1934) - Detective (uncredited)
- Lady by Choice (1934) - Bouncer (uncredited)
- The Firebird (1934) - Policeman (uncredited)
- I Am a Thief (1934) - Jewel Guard (uncredited)
- Mills of the Gods (1934) - Guard
- When a Man's a Man (1935) - Bartender (uncredited)
- The Whole Town's Talking (1935) - Gatekeeper (uncredited)
- Big Calibre (1935) - Butch (uncredited)
- Border Brigands (1935) - 2nd Bartender (uncredited)
- Girl in the Case (1935)
- Branded a Coward (1935) - Man Who Calls Johnny a Coward (uncredited)
- Westward Ho (1935) - Bartender (uncredited)
- Tumbling Tumbleweeds (1935) - Blacksmith (uncredited)
- Thunder Mountain (1935) - Bartender (uncredited)
- The Ivory-Handled Gun (1935) - 3rd Bartender (uncredited)
- Escape from Devil's Island (1935) - Adjutant (uncredited)
- Midnight Phantom (1935) - Police Officer (uncredited)
- The Cheyenne Tornado (1935) - Bartender (uncredited)
- Border Caballero (1936) - Bartender (uncredited)
- The Millionaire Kid (1936) - Morley
- Lightnin' Bill Carson (1936) - Blacksmith Joe (uncredited)
- Winds of the Wasteland (1936) - Race Starter (uncredited)
- The Lion's Den (1936) - Bartender (uncredited)
- Prison Shadows (1936) - Coroner (uncredited)
- Anthony Adverse (1936) - Italian Man (uncredited)
- Cain and Mabel (1936) - Nero (uncredited)
- The Charge of the Light Brigade (1936) - Sepoy (uncredited)
- Wild Brian Kent (1936) - Flunky (uncredited)
- Law and Lead (1936) - Bartender Johnny (uncredited)
- Park Avenue Logger (1937) - Contest Official (uncredited)
- Behind the Headlines (1937) - Bartender Johnny
- A Day at the Races (1937) - Policeman Pursuing Hugo (uncredited)
- Slaves in Bondage (1937) - Police Dispatcher (uncredited)
- State Police (1938) - Bartender (uncredited)
- The Amazing Dr. Clitterhouse (1938) - Forensic (uncredited)
- Honor of the West (1939) - Rodeo Announcer
- Mystery Plane (1939) - Detective (uncredited)
- Zenobia (1939) - Townsman (uncredited)
- Mr. Smith Goes to Washington (1939) - Doorman (uncredited)
- The Pal from Texas (1939) - Bartender (uncredited)
- The Honeymoon's Over (1939) - Doorman (uncredited)
- Florian (1940) - Peasant (uncredited)
- Wagons Westward (1940) - Bartender (uncredited)
- Three Men from Texas (1940) - Bartender (uncredited)
- Tall, Dark and Handsome (1941) - Santa Claus (uncredited)
- Border Vigilantes (1941) - Bartender (uncredited)
- We Go Fast (1941) - Train Conductor (uncredited)
- Borrowed Hero (1941) - Turnkey (uncredited)
- Rolling Down the Great Divide (1942) - Bartender (uncredited)
- The Payoff (1942) - Police Officer (uncredited)
- The Boss of Big Town (1942) - Court Clerk (uncredited)
- Quiet Please, Murder (1942) - Air Raid Warden (uncredited)
- Hitler's Madman (1943) - Guard (uncredited)
- Nob Hill (1945) - Politician (uncredited)
- Ramrod (1947) - Barfly (uncredited)
