= His Sweetheart =

- Directed by: Donald Crisp
- Screenplay by: George Beban; John B. Clymer; Lawrence McCloskey
- Story by: George Beban; Lawrence McCloskey
- Produced by: Oliver Morosco
- Starring: George Beban; Helen Jerome Eddy; Sarah Kernan; Harry De Vere; Cecil Holland; Kathleen Kirkham
- Cinematography: J.O. Taylor
- Production company: Oliver Morosco Photoplay Company
- Distributed by: Paramount Pictures
- Release date: January 29, 1917
- Running time: 50 minutes
- Country: United States
- Language: Silent (English intertitles)

His Sweetheart is a 1917 American silent drama film directed by Donald Crisp and written by George Beban, John B. Clymer and Lawrence McCloskey. The film stars George Beban, Helen Jerome Eddy, Sarah Kernan, Harry De Vere, Cecil Holland and Kathleen Kirkham. The film was released on January 29, 1917, by Paramount Pictures.

== Cast ==
- George Beban as Joe
- Helen Jerome Eddy as Trina Capino
- Sarah Kernan as Joe's mother, Mama Mia
- Harry De Vere as Godfrey Kelland
- Cecil Holland
- Kathleen Kirkham as Mrs. Kelland
- Peaches Jackson
- J.N. Leonard
- Robert E. Rolson
- Charles Yorba

== Preservation status ==
This film survives and is held in the Library of Congress, Packard Campus for Audio-Visual Conservation collection.
