= George Humbert =

Italian-born American actor

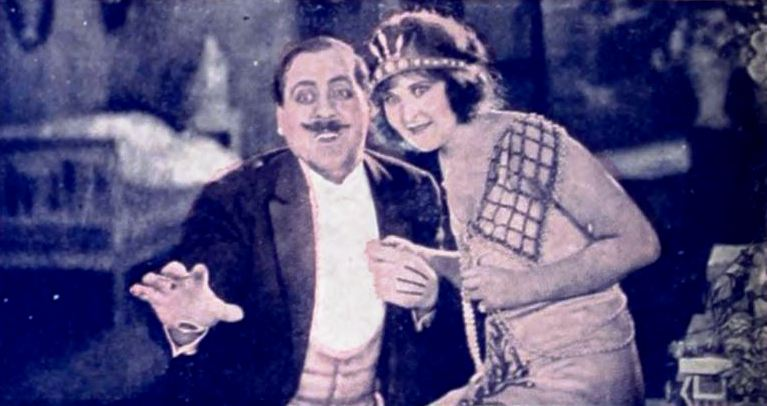
- Humbert and Hope Hampton in Stardust (1922)
- Born: Umberto Gianni; July 29, 1880; Pisa, Tuscany, Italy
- Died: May 8, 1963 (aged 82); Los Angeles, California, U.S.
- Occupation: Actor

George Humbert (born Umberto Gianni; July 29, 1880 – May 8, 1963) was an Italian-born American actor who appeared in more than 100 films between 1918 and the 1950s. He emigrated to the United States as a steerage passenger on board the Italian steamer Sannio, which sailed from Genoa, Italy and arrived at the Port of New York in June 1907; he was examined by the U.S. immigration service on Ellis Island and allowed to enter the United States legally. He became a United States citizen in 1933.

Humbert was a nephew of Italian actor Ernesto Rossi, and he served as an ensign in the Royal Italian Navy. The Duke of Abruzzi, after hearing Humbert perform, recommended that he enter the Florence Music Conservatory. After Humbert performed in opera in Italy, he joined the San Carlo Opera Company in the United States.

In addition to his acting, Humbert coached other actors, including Gloria Swanson and George Beban, in mannerisms of Italian people.

== Selected filmography ==
| Year | Title | Role |
|---|---|---|
| 1918 | The Woman and the Law | |
| 1918 | We Should Worry | Pierre Picard |
| 1918 | Why America Will Win | Gen. Pancho Villa |
| 1918 | The Caillaux Case | Albert Calmette |
| 1919 | Bullin' the Bullsheviki | |
| 1922 | Stardust | Antonio Marvelli |
| 1924 | The Greatest Love of All | Interpreter |
| 1932 | The Night Club Lady | Andre |
| 1932 | Hearts of Humanity | Tony |
| 1933 | The California Trail | Mayor Alberto Piedra |
| 1934 | Whom the Gods Destroy | Niccoli |
| 1934 | Redhead | Pasquale |
| 1936 | The Public Pays | Simonelli |
| 1936 | Sea Spoilers | Johnny "Hop-Scotch" |
| 1937 | Love and Hisses | Chef |
| 1937 | Nancy Steele Is Missing! | Giuseppe Spano |
| 1937 | A Girl with Ideas | Toni |
| 1937 | Porky's Garden | Italian Poultry Farmer (voice) |
| 1938 | Island in the Sky | Peter Trompas |
| 1938 | No Time to Marry | Buenocasa |
| 1938 | Swing It, Sailor! | Pet Shop Proprietor |
| 1939 | Daughters Courageous | Manuel Lopez |
| 1939 | Fisherman's Wharf | Pietro |
| 1939 | Full Confession | Mercantonio |
| 1940 | Boys of the City | Tony |
| 1940 | Girl from Avenue A | Sylvester Gallupi |
| 1941 | Fiesta | Pancho |
| 1941 | Law of the Timber | Eric |
