= Lost in Transit (1917 film) =

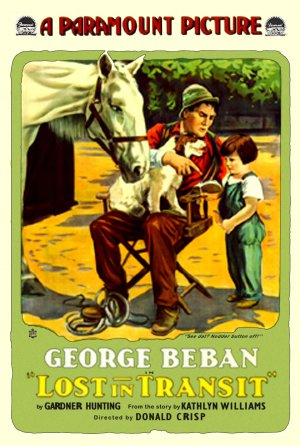
- Theatrical release poster
- Directed by: Donald Crisp
- Screenplay by: Gardner Hunting; Kathlyn Williams
- Produced by: Julia Crawford Ivers
- Starring: George Beban; Helen Jerome Eddy; Pietro Sosso; Vera Lewis; Henry A. Barrows; Frank Bennett
- Cinematography: Faxon M. Dean
- Production company: Pallas Pictures
- Distributed by: Paramount Pictures
- Release date: September 3, 1917
- Running time: 50 minutes
- Country: United States
- Language: Silent (English intertitles)

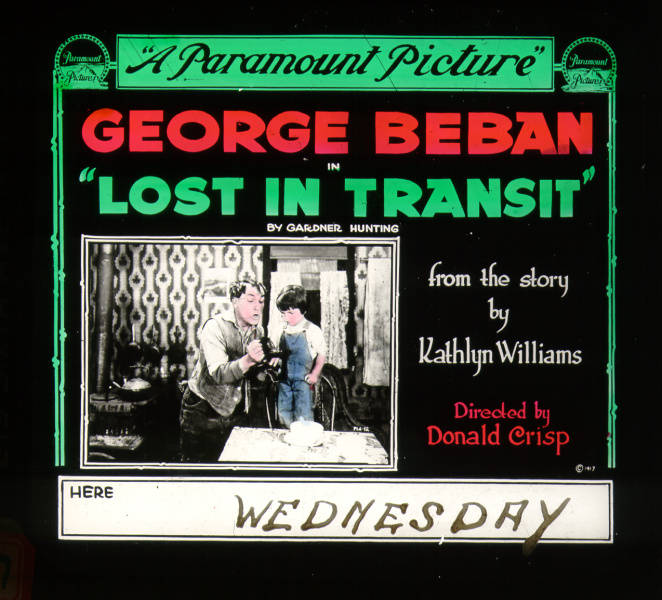
A lantern slide for the film

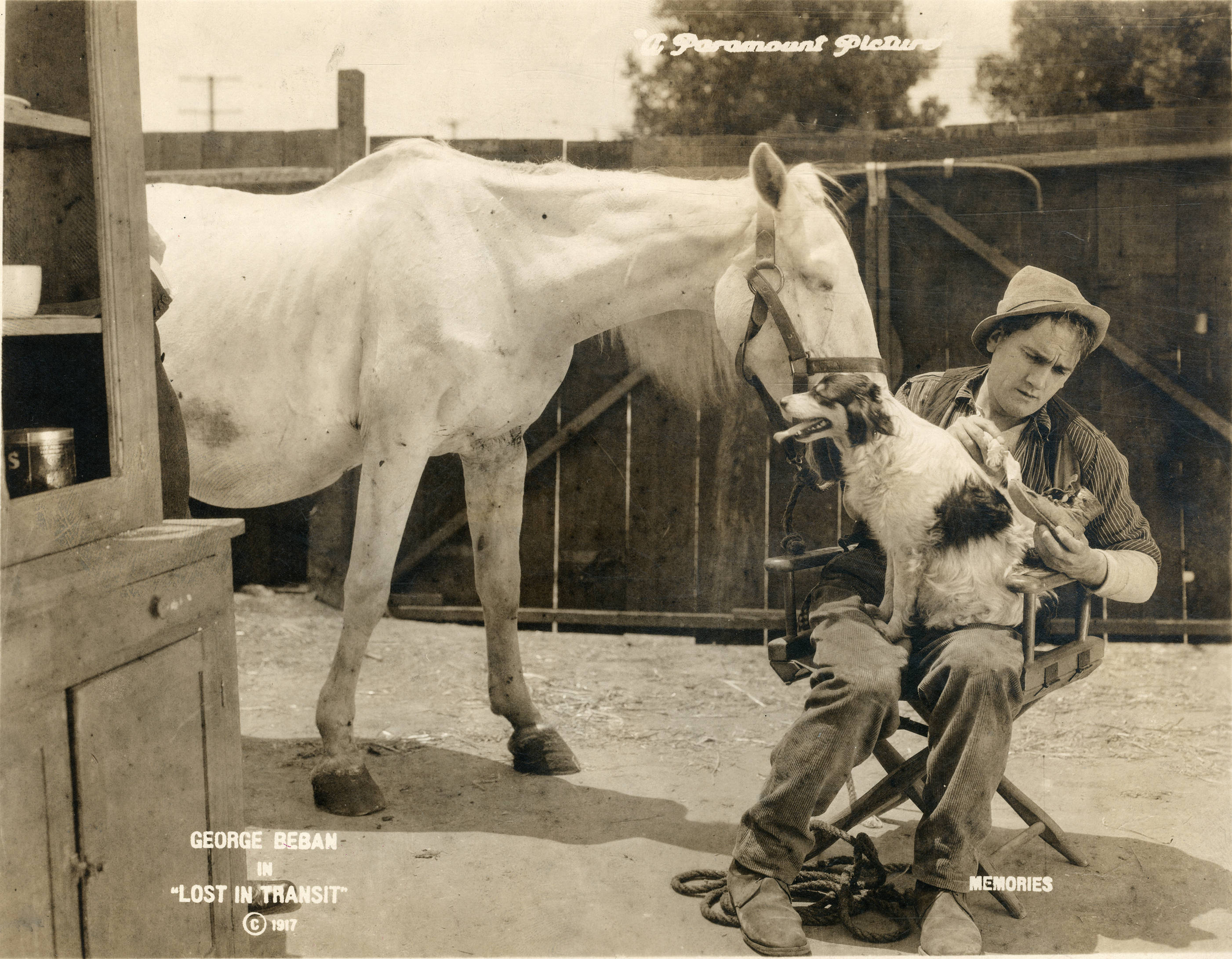
A scene from Lost in Transit

Lost in Transit is a lost 1917 American silent drama film directed by Donald Crisp and written by Gardner Hunting and Kathlyn Williams. The film stars George Beban, Helen Jerome Eddy, Pietro Sosso, Vera Lewis, Henry A. Barrows, and Frank Bennett. The film was released on September 3, 1917, by Paramount Pictures.

== Plot ==
As described in a film magazine, upon the death of his wife during the birth of his son, the wealthy Mr. Kendall places the child in a home and expresses a desire never to see his baby again. After two and one-half years of loneliness, however, he sends for the youngster. On the way home, the child is kidnapped from the carriage and the father and servants are mystified. In the meantime, Niccolo, an Italian junkman, finds a youngster among the rags of his cart and takes him home, intending on the following day to turn the child over to the police. He becomes attached to the little fellow and puts off going to the authorities. Another Italian, hearing of the Kendall reward, discloses that Niccolo has a baby concealed in his home and they take the child away upon the testimony of a grafting nurse. The death of a pickpocket, however, clears up the disappearance of the Kendall baby and the real Kendall heir is returned to his father, while Niccolo is allowed by a kindly judge to retain possession of his new ward.

== Cast ==
- George Beban as Niccolo Darini
- Helen Jerome Eddy as Nita Lapi
- Pietro Sosso as Lapi
- Vera Lewis as Mrs. Flint
- Henry A. Barrows as Mr. Kendall
- Frank Bennett as Paolo Marso
- Robert White as Baby

== Reception ==
Like many American films of the time, Lost in Transit was subject to cuts by city and state film censorship boards. The Chicago Board of Censors required a cut of the shooting in a vision scene.
