= The Marcellini Millions =

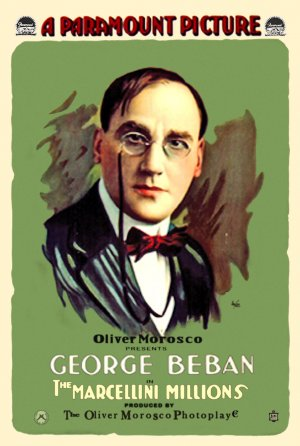
- Theatrical release poster
- Directed by: Donald Crisp
- Screenplay by: George Beban; Edith M. Kennedy
- Produced by: Oliver Morosco
- Starring: George Beban; Helen Jerome Eddy; Pietro Sosso; Henry Woodward; Fred Huntley; Mae Gaston
- Cinematography: Faxon M. Dean
- Production company: Oliver Morosco Photoplay Company
- Distributed by: Paramount Pictures
- Release date: May 14, 1917
- Running time: 50 minutes
- Country: United States
- Languages: Silent; English intertitles

The Marcellini Millions is a 1917 American silent drama film directed by Donald Crisp and written by George Beban and Edith M. Kennedy. The film stars George Beban, Helen Jerome Eddy, Pietro Sosso, Henry Woodward, Fred Huntley and Mae Gaston. The film was released on May 14, 1917, by Paramount Pictures.

A print is preserved in the Museum of Modern Art collection.

== Cast ==
- George Beban as Guido Bartelli
- Helen Jerome Eddy as Antoinetta Bartelli
- Pietro Sosso as Leo Marcellini
- Henry Woodward as Wade Crosby
- Fred Huntley as Mr. Hargrave
- Mae Gaston as Nancy Harris
- W.H. Bainbridge as E.J. Waring
- Eugene Pallette as Mr. Murray
- Adele Farrington as Mrs. Murray
