= The Buckaroo Kid =

1926 film

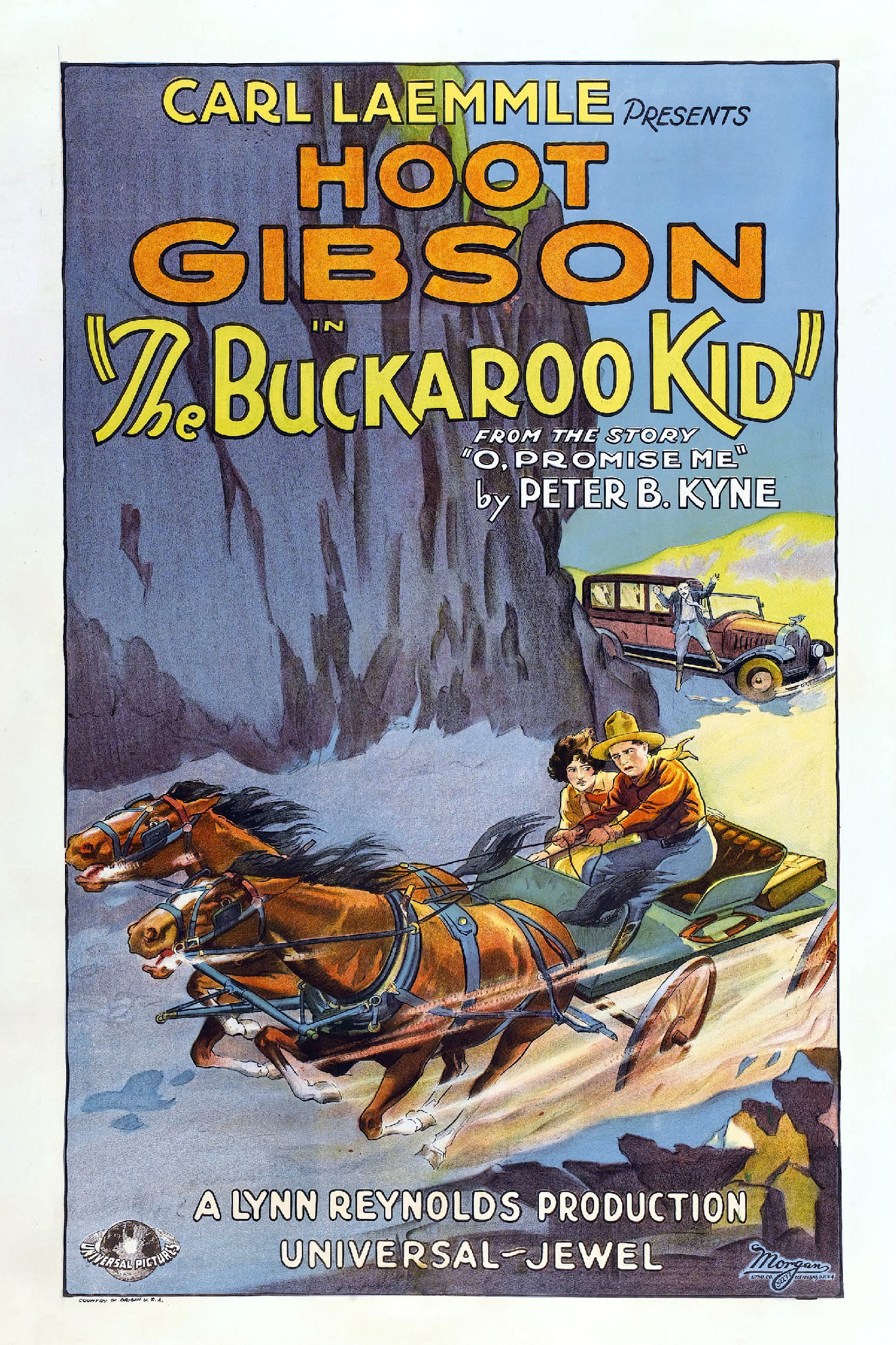
- Film poster
- Directed by: Lynn Reynolds
- Written by: Lynn Reynolds
- Based on: Oh, Promise Me by Peter B. Kyne
- Produced by: Carl Laemmle
- Starring: Hoot Gibson
- Cinematography: Harry Neumann
- Distributed by: Universal Pictures
- Release date: November 14, 1926
- Running time: 6 reels
- Country: United States
- Languages: Silent; English intertitles

The Buckaroo Kid is a 1926 American silent Western film directed by Lynn Reynolds and starring Hoot Gibson. It was produced and distributed by Universal Pictures and is based on the short story Oh, Promise Me by Peter B. Kyne that appeared in Collier's Magazine on August 20, 1926.

A copy survives in the Museum of Modern Art.

== Cast ==
- Hoot Gibson as Ed Harley
- Ethel Shannon as Lyra Radigan
- Burr McIntosh as Henry Radigan
- Harry Todd as Tom Darby
- James Gordon as James Mulford
- Clark Comstock as Ranch Manager (uncredited)
- Newton House as Ed Harley as a Boy (uncredited)
- Arthur Millett as Bodyguard (uncredited)
- Joe Rickson as McIntyre
- Arthur Thalasso as Bodyguard (uncredited)
