= Fifty-Fifty (1916 film) =

1916 film by Allan Dwan

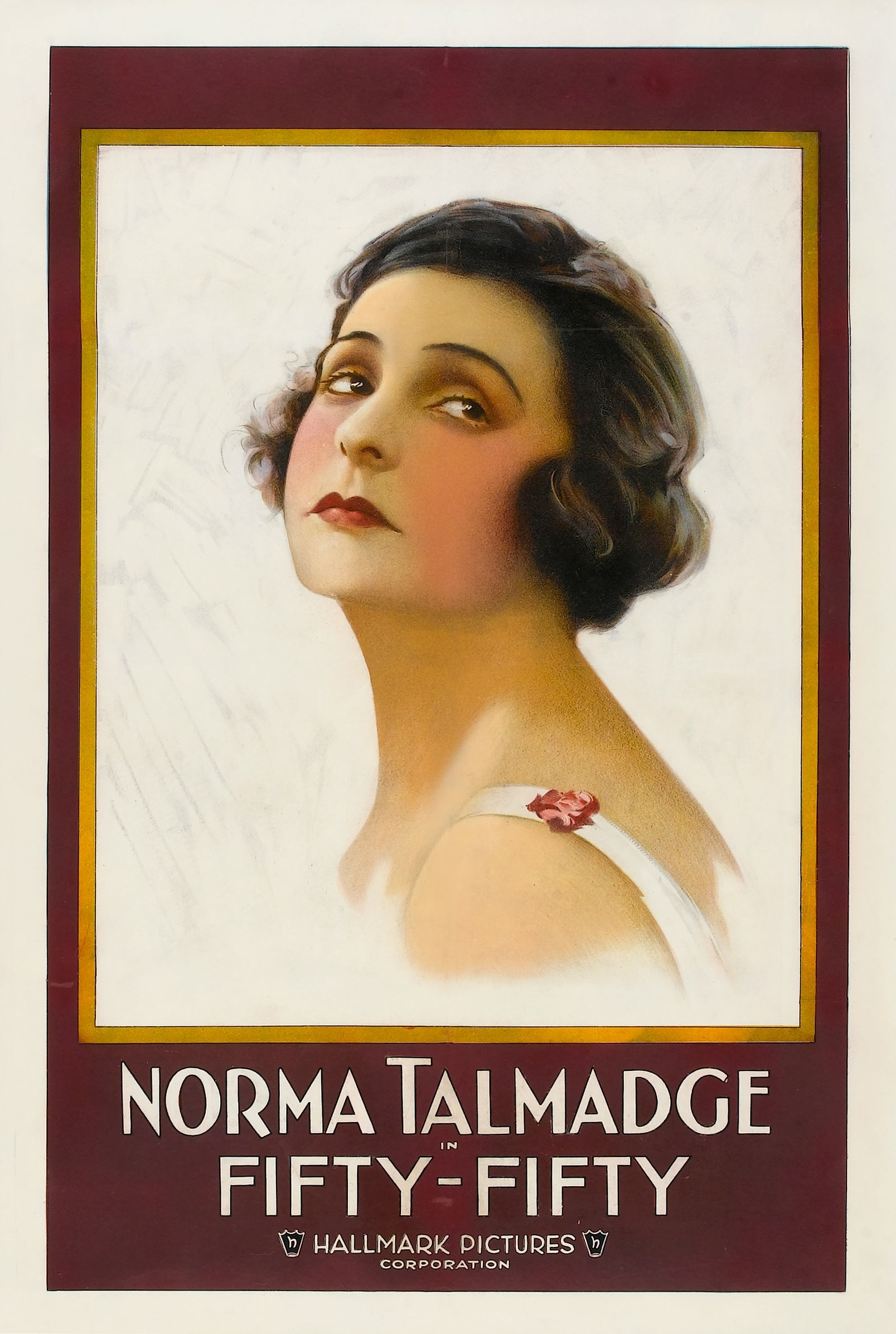
- Movie poster
- Directed by: Allan Dwan
- Written by: Allan Dwan (original story); Robert Shirley (adaptation)
- Produced by: D. W. Griffith
- Starring: Norma Talmadge; J. W. Johnston; Marie Chambers
- Production company: Fine Arts Film Company
- Distributed by: Triangle Film Corporation
- Release date: October 22, 1916
- Running time: 55 min. (6-reels)
- Country: United States
- Language: Silent (English intertitles)

Fifty-Fifty is an American silent drama film directed by Allan Dwan whose story was adapted for the screen by Robert Shirley. The Fine Arts Film Company production was made under the aegis of Triangle Film Corporation which released it on October 22, 1916. The leading roles are played by Norma Talmadge, J. W. Johnston, and Marie Chambers. A print of the film is in the George Eastman Museum Motion Picture Collection.

== Plot ==
The title, which refers to the community property division of marital assets in divorce proceedings, foretells the dissolution of the union between financially secure Frederick Harmon and Naomi, a fun-loving uninhibited artist whom her Bohemian artist friends affectionately reference as "the Nut". The "other woman", intent on misleading Harmon as to his wife's virtue and intentions completes the triangle. The matter comes up for a resolution in front of a wise and experienced family court judge.

== Cast ==
- Norma Talmadge as Naomi Harmon
- J. W. Johnston as Frederic Harmon
- Marie Chambers as Helen Crew
- Ruth Darling as Louise O'Mally
- Harry Northrup as Former Prisoner
- Frank Currier as Judge
- Dodson Mitchell as Detective
- Warner Richmond as Dandy

== Remake ==
A 1925 remake also titled Fifty-fifty, set the story in Paris and New York, had a French director, Henri Diamant-Berger, and starred Hope Hampton, Lionel Barrymore and Louise Glaum.
