= The Cook of Canyon Camp =

1917 film by Donald Crisp

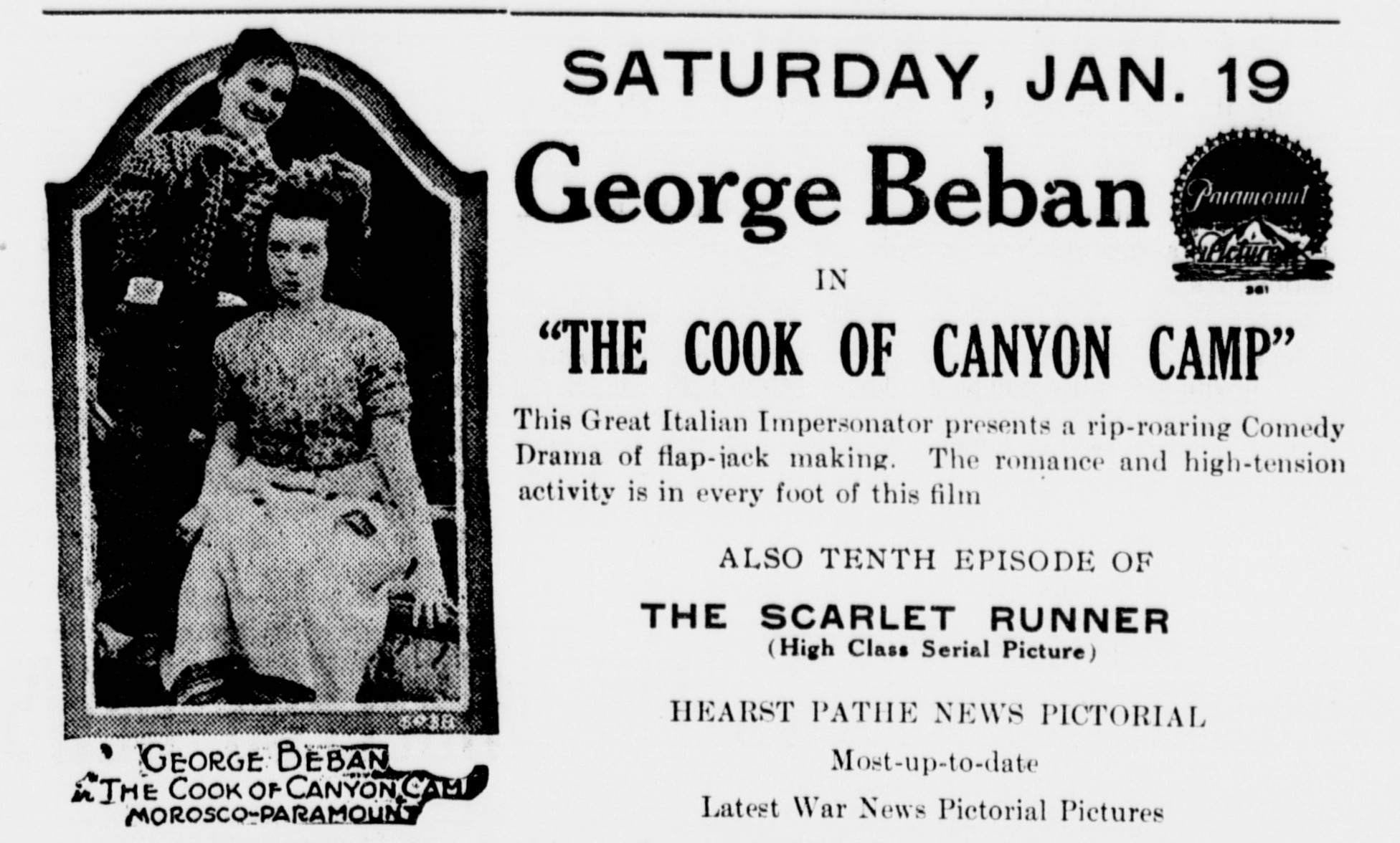
- Newspaper advertisement
- Directed by: Donald Crisp
- Screenplay by: Donald Crisp; Julia Crawford Ivers
- Produced by: Oliver Morosco
- Starring: George Beban; Monroe Salisbury; Florence Vidor; Helen Jerome Eddy; John Burton
- Cinematography: Faxon M. Dean
- Production company: Oliver Morosco Photoplay Company
- Distributed by: Paramount Pictures
- Release date: July 19, 1917
- Running time: 50 minutes
- Country: United States
- Language: English

The Cook of Canyon Camp is a lost 1917 American drama silent film directed by Donald Crisp and written by Donald Crisp and Julia Crawford Ivers. The film stars George Beban, Monroe Salisbury, Florence Vidor, Helen Jerome Eddy and John Burton. The film was released on July 19, 1917, by Paramount Pictures.

== Cast ==
- George Beban as Jean
- Monroe Salisbury as Silent Jack
- Florence Vidor as Mrs. Jack
- Helen Jerome Eddy as Marie
- John Burton as Marie's Father
