= The Hostage (1917 film) =

- Directed by: Robert Thornby
- Screenplay by: Beulah Marie Dix
- Produced by: Jesse L. Lasky
- Starring: Wallace Reid; Dorothy Abril; Gertrude Short; Clarence Geldart; Guy Oliver; Marcia Manon
- Cinematography: Henry Kotani
- Production company: Jesse L. Lasky Feature Play Company
- Distributed by: Paramount Pictures
- Release date: September 10, 1917
- Running time: 50 minutes
- Country: United States
- Language: Silent (English intertitles)

The Hostage is a 1917 American silent drama film directed by Robert Thornby and written by Beulah Marie Dix. The film stars Wallace Reid, Dorothy Abril, Gertrude Short, Clarence Geldart, Guy Oliver, and Marcia Manon. The film was released on September 10, 1917, by Paramount Pictures.

== Cast ==
- Wallace Reid as Lieutenant Kemper
- Dorothy Abril as Nathalia
- Gertrude Short as Sophia
- Clarence Geldart as Brigadier
- Guy Oliver as Vanvoyd
- Marcia Manon as Eunice
- Noah Beery as Boyadi
- George Spaulding as Ragnor
- Lillian Leighton as Marienka
- Lucien Littlefield as Paul

== Reception ==
Like many American films of the time, The Hostage was subject to cuts by city and state film censorship boards. The Chicago Board of Censors ordered cut the first two torture scenes and the flashing of four additional torture scenes.
