= The Forbidden Thing =

1920 film by Allan Dwan

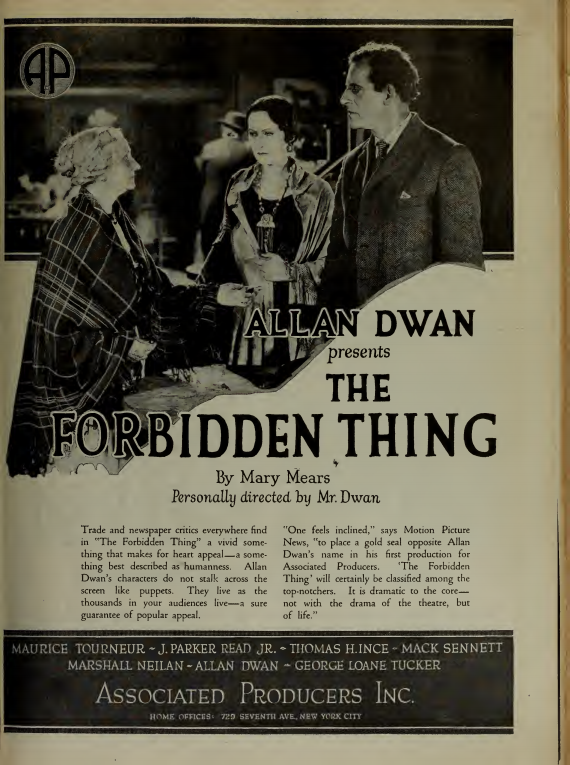
- Directed by: Allan Dwan
- Written by: Allan Dwan; Mary Mears
- Produced by: Allan Dwan
- Starring: James Kirkwood; Helen Jerome Eddy; Marcia Manon
- Cinematography: Tony Gaudio
- Production company: Allan Dwan Productions
- Distributed by: Associated Producers
- Release date: November 4, 1920
- Running time: 60 minutes
- Country: United States
- Languages: Silent; English intertitles

The Forbidden Thing is a 1920 American silent drama film directed by Allan Dwan and starring James Kirkwood, Helen Jerome Eddy and Marcia Manon.

== Cast ==
- James Kirkwood as Abel Blake
- Helen Jerome Eddy as Joan
- Marcia Manon as Glory Prada
- King Baggot as Dave
- Gertrude Claire as Mrs. Blake
- Jack Roseleigh as Jose
- Arthur Thalasso as Joe Portega
- Newton Hall as The Boy
- Harry Griffith as Ryan
- Katherine Norton as Mrs. Ryan

== Bibliography ==
- Frederic Lombardi. Allan Dwan and the Rise and Decline of the Hollywood Studios. McFarland, 2013.
