= The Pawn of Fate =

1916 film directed by Maurice Tourneur

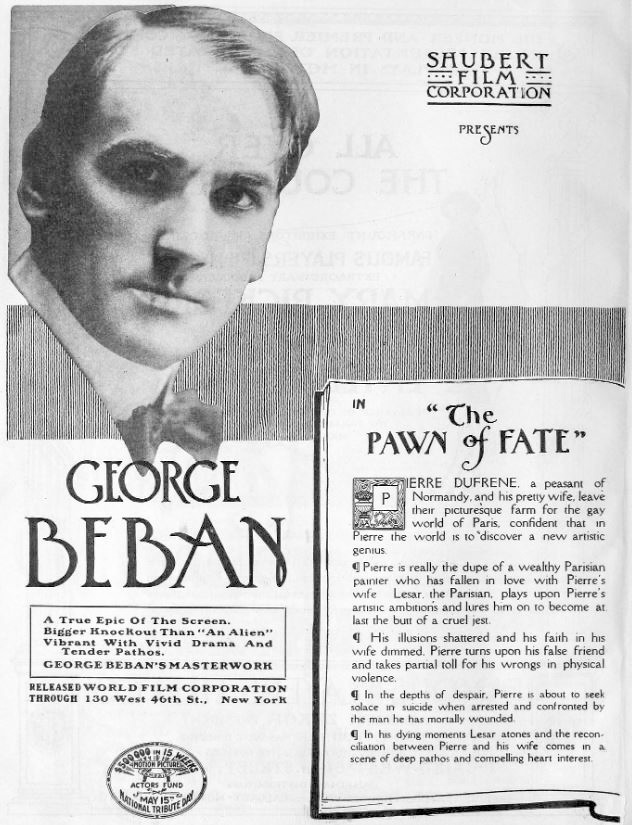
- Advertisement
- Directed by: Maurice Tourneur
- Written by: George Beban
- Starring: George Beban; Doris Kenyon; Charles W. Charles
- Edited by: Clarence Brown
- Production company: Shubert Film Corporation
- Distributed by: World Film
- Release date: February 28, 1916
- Running time: 50 minutes
- Country: United States
- Languages: Silent; English intertitles

The Pawn of Fate is a 1916 American silent drama film directed by Maurice Tourneur and starring George Beban, Doris Kenyon, and Charles W. Charles.

The film's sets were designed by the art director Ben Carré.

== Plot ==
As described in a film magazine, André Lesar, a wealthy Parisian artist comes to the Normandy farm of Pierre Dufrene and his wife Marcine seeking a rest. He is attracted by the simple-minded young wife. Pierre picks up one of Lesar's canvases and crudely sketches his wife's picture. In a spirit of mischief, Lesar tells Pierre he has natural artistic genius and persuades him to come to Paris to complete his art education, agreeing to foot all the bills. Pierre takes his wife with him, and they live at the artist's home. Pierre paints a huge canvas depleting life on his sheep farm. Lesar publishes a notice that he has discovered a wonderful genius and invites his friends and the art critics to the unveiling of the painting. Meantime, Lesar loses no time in making overtures to the wife. Lesar piles everyone with wine and then reveals Pierre's painting. In a maudlin state, Pierre barely realizes he is the butt of a cruel jest and is dimly conscious that the visitors to the studio are laughing derisively as they depart. After the guests leave, Lesar starts to "roughhouse" with Marcine. Pierre enters the room, sees his wife in Lesar's arms, and, believing her guilty, throws her out of the room, locks the door and announces that only one of them will leave the room alive. The man-of-the-world attitude of Lesar is in contrast to the seriousness of the poor peasant as Pierre, his faith in his wife dimmed, turns and beats Lesar. Pierre leaves and in his despair considers suicide but is arrested and then is confronted by the man whom he has mortally wounded. In his dying moments Lesar atones, which eventually allows a reconciliation between Pierre and Marcine. After some troubling times, it all ends happily for Pierre and Marcine.

== Cast ==
- George Beban as Pierre Dufrene
- Doris Kenyon as Marcine Dufrene
- Charles W. Charles as Father Dufrene
- John Davidson as André Lesar
- Johnny Hines as Giradot
- Alec B. Francis as Abbé Paul
- Mary Booth as Suzanne

== Production ==
George Beban both wrote and starred in the film as the husband Pierre. Playing the role of the much younger wife Marcine, this was one of Kenyon's first films. A review in Variety, when describing the bucolic existence of the couple on the farm in the opening scenes of the film, states that "Marcine is young and full of life, and when she disobeys, Pierre lays her across his lap and spanks her". This review is an example of an early film where a husband spanks his adult wife within a supposed happy marriage. The spanking of sweethearts and wives as a cinematic trope to suggest romance would be used up through the 1960s.

== Reception ==
A review in Variety noted that, while the film may have some "minor defects in details" that would not be noticed by the average viewer, it sized up as a "rattling good feature".

== Preservation ==
With no prints of The Pawn of Fate located in any film archives, it is a lost film.

== Bibliography ==
- Waldman, Harry. Maurice Tourneur: The Life and Films. McFarland, 2001.
