= The Sign of the Rose =

1922 film

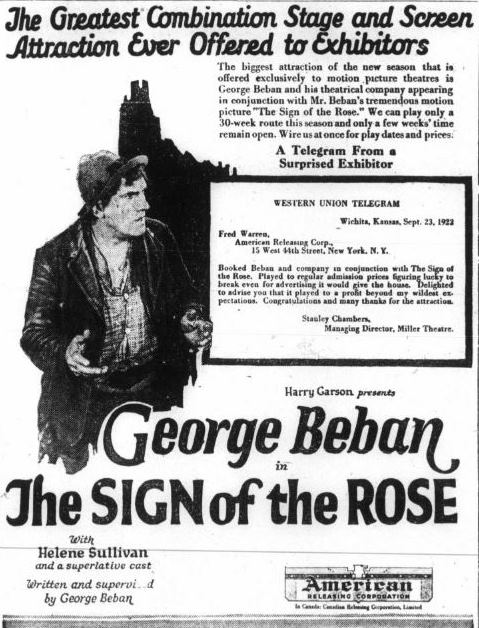
- Directed by: Harry Garson
- Written by: George Beban; J.A. Brocklehurst; Coral Burnette; Carroll Owen
- Produced by: George Beban; Harry Garson
- Starring: George Beban; Jeanne Carpenter; Charles Edler
- Cinematography: Sam Landers
- Edited by: Violet Blair
- Production company: George Beban Productions
- Distributed by: American Releasing Corporation
- Release date: September 3, 1922
- Running time: 60 minutes
- Country: United States
- Languages: Silent; English intertitles

The Sign of the Rose is a 1922 American silent drama film directed by Harry Garson and starring George Beban, Jeanne Carpenter and Charles Edler.

== Cast ==
- Helene Sullivan as Lillian Griswold
- Charles Edler as William Griswold
- Jeanne Carpenter as Dorothy Griswold
- Gene Cameron as Philip Griswold
- Louise Calmenti as Rosa
- Stanhope Wheatcroft as Cecil Robbins
- Arthur Thalasso as Detective Lynch
- George Beban as Pietro Balletti
- Dorothy Giraci as Rosina Balletti
- M. Solomon as Moses Erbstein

== Bibliography ==
- Connelly, Robert B. The Silents: Silent Feature Films, 1910-36, Volume 40, Issue 2. December Press, 1998.
- Munden, Kenneth White. The American Film Institute Catalog of Motion Pictures Produced in the United States, Part 1. University of California Press, 1997.
