= The Girl Who Came Back (1918 film) =

1918 film

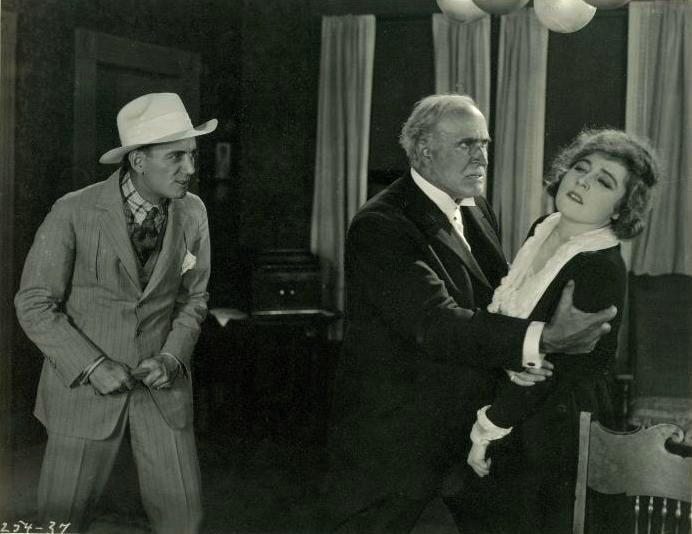
- Still with Charles West, Theodore Roberts, and Ethel Clayton
- Directed by: Robert G. Vignola
- Screenplay by: Beulah Marie Dix
- Based on: The Girl Who Came Back by C. M. S. McLellan
- Produced by: Jesse L. Lasky
- Starring: Ethel Clayton; Elliott Dexter; Theodore Roberts; James Neill; Charles West; Marcia Manon
- Cinematography: Charles Edgar Schoenbaum
- Production company: Famous Players–Lasky Corporation
- Distributed by: Paramount Pictures
- Release date: September 8, 1918
- Running time: 50 minutes
- Country: United States
- Language: Silent (English intertitles)

The Girl Who Came Back is a 1918 American silent drama film directed by Robert G. Vignola and written by Beulah Marie Dix based upon the play by C. M. S. McLellan. The film stars Ethel Clayton, Elliott Dexter, Theodore Roberts, James Neill, Charles West, and Marcia Manon. The film was released on September 8, 1918, by Paramount Pictures.

== Plot ==
As described in a film magazine, Lois Hartner, daughter of the thief Michael "Old Hartner", is saved from death in a shipwreck by George Bayard, a state senator and social reformer. Her father plans to rob the Bayard house of a valuable string of pearls. Lois is charged with the duty of obtaining the pearls, but during the operation George surprises her. Ralph Burton, scapegrace brother-in-law of George, takes the pearls while George is absent from the room, and George believes Lois has taken them. She has determined to give up the criminal life she was living and goes to the West. After Ralph confesses to the theft, George finds her and makes her his wife.

== Cast ==
- Ethel Clayton as Lois Hartner
- Elliott Dexter as State Sen. George Bayard
- Theodore Roberts as Michael Hartner
- James Neill as Gov. Burton
- Charles West as Ralph Burton
- Marcia Manon as Dorothy Burton
- Jack Brammall as Doyle
- Jane Wolfe as Mrs. Walters
- John McKinnon as Bayard's Butler
- Pansy Perry as Burton's Maid

== Reception ==
Like many American films of the time, The Girl Who Came Back was subject to restrictions and cuts by city and state film censorship boards. For example, the Chicago Board of Censors required a cut, in Reel 2, of two scenes of young woman turning combination of safe where light plays on her hands.

== Preservation status ==
The Girl Who Came Back is preserved in the Filmmuseum Nederland or EYE Institut, Netherlands.
