= The Prison Without Walls =

- Directed by: E. Mason Hopper
- Screenplay by: Beulah Marie Dix; Robert E. MacAlarney
- Produced by: Jesse L. Lasky
- Starring: Wallace Reid; Myrtle Stedman; William Conklin; William Elmer; Marcia Manon; James Neill
- Cinematography: Allen M. Davey
- Production company: Jesse L. Lasky Feature Play Company
- Distributed by: Paramount Pictures
- Release date: March 15, 1917
- Running time: 50 minutes
- Country: United States
- Language: English

The Prison Without Walls is a 1917 American drama silent film directed by E. Mason Hopper and written by Beulah Marie Dix and Robert E. MacAlarney. The film stars Wallace Reid, Myrtle Stedman, William Conklin, William Elmer, Marcia Manon and James Neill. The film was released on March 15, 1917, by Paramount Pictures.

== Cast ==
- Wallace Reid as Huntington Babbs
- Myrtle Stedman as Helen Ainsworth
- William Conklin as Norman Morris
- William Elmer as Horse Gilligan
- Marcia Manon as Felice Rossa
- James Neill as John Havens
- Lillian Leighton
- Clarence Geldart
