= Helen Jerome Eddy =

American actress (1897–1990)

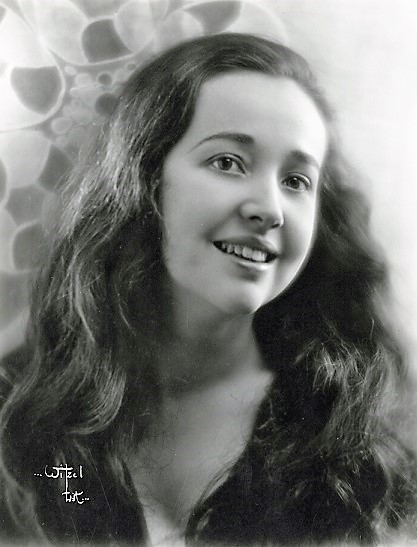
- Eddy in 1920
- Born: February 25, 1897; Manhattan, New York City, U.S.
- Died: January 27, 1990 (aged 92); Alhambra, California, U.S.
- Occupation: Actress
- Years active: 1915–1947

Helen Jerome Eddy (February 25, 1897 – January 27, 1990) was a movie actress from New York City. She was noted as a character actress who played genteel heroines in films such as Rebecca of Sunnybrook Farm (1917).

== Early years ==
Eddy was born in New York City on February 25, 1897, and was raised in Los Angeles. As a youth, she acted in productions put on by the Pasadena Playhouse. She became interested in films through the studio of Siegmund Lubin, which was based in Philadelphia, Pennsylvania. In her youth, they opened a backlot in her Los Angeles neighborhood.

== Career ==
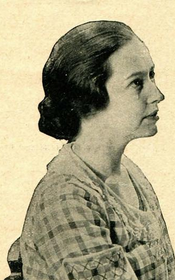
The Flirt (1923)

Lubin's studio rejected a scenario that Eddy wrote at age 17, "but decided to capitalize on her face", using her in vamp roles in "lurid melodramas".

Eddy's first movie was The Discontented Man (1915). Soon after, she left Lubin and joined Paramount Pictures. At this time, she began to play the roles for which she is best remembered. Other films in which the actress participated include The March Hare (1921), The Dark Angel, Camille, Quality Street, The Divine Lady (1929) and the first Our Gang talkie Small Talk (1929).

She made Girls Demand Excitement in 1931 and The Secret Life of Walter Mitty, her final film, in 1947.

Eddy thrived on playing varied characters and said "Italian women, French, Turkish, girls of the Bowery, kitchenmaids — they're all in the day's work".

Dissatisfaction with her salary led Eddy to retire from her film career.

== Later years and death ==
After she retired from films, Eddy worked in real estate in Pasadena. She acted in some local productions, including playing religious characters in plays at the Pilgrimage Theater in Hollywood Hills.

Eddy died of heart failure on January 27, 1990, at the Episcopal Home in Alhambra, California at age 92.

== Partial filmography ==
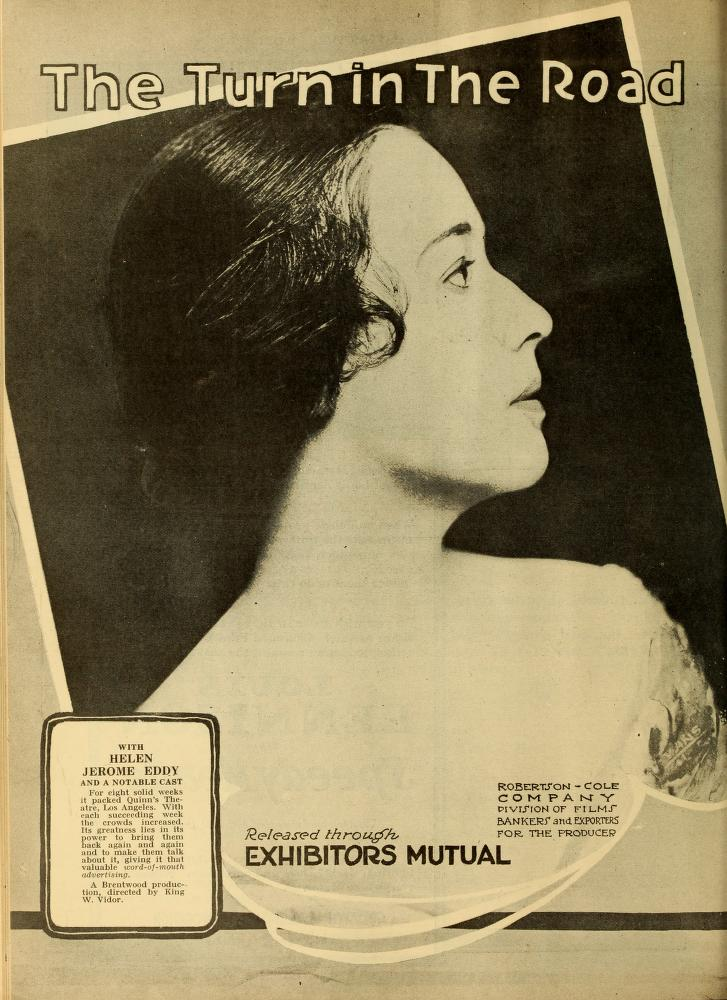
The Turn in The Road (1919)

- The Gentleman from Indiana (1915)
- Madame la Presidente (1916)
- The Tongues of Men (1916)
- The Code of Marcia Gray (1916)
- Pasquale (1916)
- Her Father's Son (1916)
- Redeeming Love (1916)
- His Sweetheart (1917)
- The Wax Model (1917)
- As Men Love (1917)
- The Marcellini Millions (1917)
- The Cook of Canyon Camp (1917)
- Lost in Transit (1917)
- Rebecca of Sunnybrook Farm (1917)
- The Fair Barbarian (1917)
- Jules of the Strong Heart (1918)
- The Spirit of '17 (1918)
- One More American (1918)
- Winner Takes All (1918)
- Old Wives for New (1918)
- Breakers Ahead (1918)
- The Trembling Hour (1919)
- The Turn in the Road (1919)
- The Boomerang (1919)
- The Man Beneath (1919)
- A Very Good Young Man (1919)
- The Tong Man (1919)
- Pollyanna (1920)
- The County Fair (1920)
- A City Sparrow (1920)
- A Light Woman (1920)
- Miss Hobbs (1920)
- The House of Toys (1920)
- The Forbidden Thing (1920)
- The Ten Dollar Raise (1921)
- One Man in a Million (1921)
- The First Born (1921)
- The March Hare (1921)
- The Other Woman (1921)
- The Flirt (1922)
- When Love Comes (1922)
- An Old Sweetheart of Mine (1923)
- The Country Kid (1923)
- To the Ladies (1923)
- The Fire Patrol (1924)
- Marry Me (1925)
- The Dark Angel (1925)
- Padlocked (1926)
- Camille (1927)
- Quality Street (1927)
- Two Lovers (1928)
- The Speed Classic (1928)
- Chicago After Midnight (1928)
- Blue Skies (1929)
- Small Talk (1929)
- Railroadin' (1929)
- Midstream (1929)
- War Nurse (1930)
- Reaching for the Moon (1930)
- The Great Meadow (1930)
- Girls Demand Excitement (1931)
- Skippy (1931)
- Sooky (1931)
- Mata Hari (1931) as Sister Genevieve
- Make Me a Star (1932)
- The Night of June 13 (1932)
- Impatient Maiden (1932)
- Frisco Jenny (1932)
- No Greater Love (1932)
- Madame Butterfly (1932)
- The Bitter Tea of General Yen (1933)
- Strictly Personal (1933)
- The Masquerader (1933)
- Torch Singer (1933)
- Night Flight (1933) as Worried Mother
- Riptide (1934)
- Unknown Blonde (1934)
- A Girl of the Limberlost (1934)
- A Shot in the Dark (1935)
- Keeper of the Bees (1935)
- The Country Doctor (1936)
- Winterset (1936)
- Klondike Annie (1936)
- Jim Hanvey, Detective (1937)
- The Strange Case of Dr. Meade (1938)
- Scandal Sheet (1939)
- Strike Up the Band (1940)
