= Heaven on Earth (1927 American film) =

1927 film

- Directed by: Phil Rosen
- Screenplay by: Harvey Gates
- Story by: Harvey Gates
- Starring: Renée Adorée; Conrad Nagel; Gwen Lee; Julia Swayne Gordon; Marcia Manon; Pat Hartigan
- Cinematography: John Arnold
- Edited by: John English
- Production company: Metro-Goldwyn-Mayer
- Distributed by: Metro-Goldwyn-Mayer
- Release date: March 5, 1927
- Country: United States
- Language: English

Heaven on Earth is a 1927 American drama silent film directed by Phil Rosen and written by Harvey Gates. The film stars Renée Adorée, Conrad Nagel, Gwen Lee, Julia Swayne Gordon, Marcia Manon and Pat Hartigan. The film was released on March 5, 1927, by Metro-Goldwyn-Mayer.

== Cast ==
- Renée Adorée as Marcelle
- Conrad Nagel as Edmond Durand
- Gwen Lee as Claire
- Julia Swayne Gordon as Aunt Emilie
- Marcia Manon as Aunt Jeanne
- Pat Hartigan as Anton
