= J. W. Johnston =

American actor

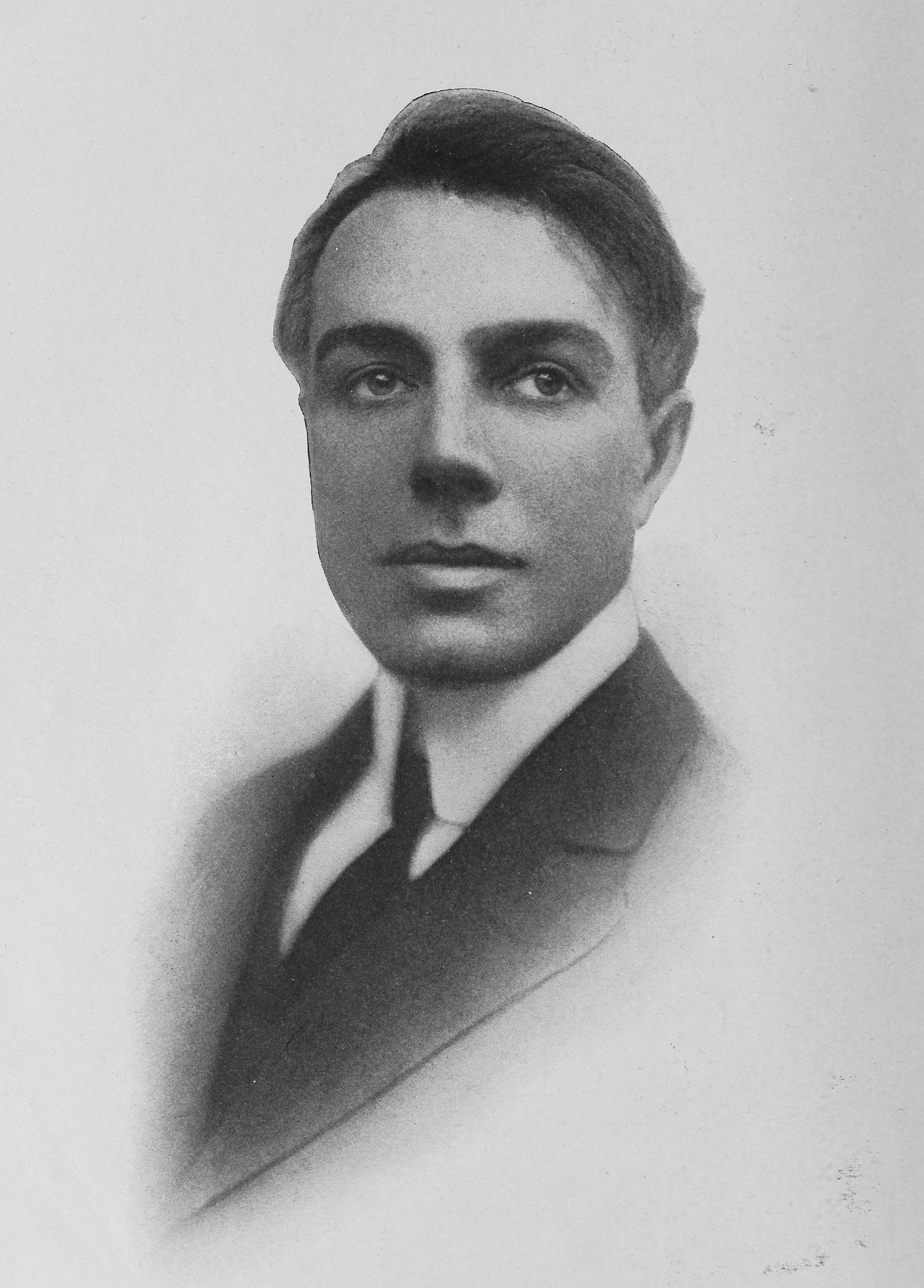
- Johnston in 1913
- Born: October 2, 1876; Kilkee, County Clare, Ireland
- Died: July 29, 1946 (aged 69); United States
- Occupation: Actor
- Years active: 1901–1946

J. W. Johnston (October 2, 1876 – July 29, 1946) was an Irish American stage and film actor who started as a supporting actor and, briefly, leading man in the 1910s and early 1920s, continued as a character performer from the mid-1920s, and ended as an unbilled bit player during the 1930s and 1940s. He was also an early member of Cecil B. DeMille's repertory company of actors, appearing in five of the director's features released between July and December 1914. Although J. W. Johnston was his most frequent billing, other appellations included J. W. Johnson, Jack W. Johnson, Jack Johnson, F. W. Johnston, John W. Johnston, Jack Johnston, Jack W. Johnston and Jack Johnstone.

== Biography ==
John William Michael Johnston was born in the County Clare town of Kilkee, on October 2, 1876. John William Michael was the middle child of three known children born to Charles Johnston and Jane Mary Hartney. Johnston had two sisters, Alicia Ellena and Janetta M Little is known of Johnston's life before he went to America. Johnston traveled to America with his parents on the ship Britannic arriving in New York on August 12, 1882, when he was five years old. Over the years Johnston made several trips between Ireland and America. On August 16, 1896, John Johnston married Allice Aloysuis Harrington and they had four children, Genevieve Johnston (1898–1898) who died at five months, then twins Edward and Charles Johnston (1899–1899) both died soon after birth, and their last child Vincent Johnston (1900–1968). We know Allice Harrington and John Johnston were living with their son Vincent in the Bronx, New York, at the time of the 1910 Census; however, they divorced sometime before 1914, when Johnston married his second wife, Onida Foster, a school teacher from Louisiana. On the marriage certificate Johnston is 37, states his occupation as salesman. There is a record of his World War I draft card (1918) on which he lists Onida as his wife and his occupation as actor being employed by Frank Talbot Modern Pictures Co. Johnston also states on this record that he is a US citizen by his father's naturalization prior to his reaching the age of majority.

Variety mentions that his initial Broadway appearance was in Paul Potter's stage adaptation of Ouida's popular historical romance, Under Two Flags, starring Blanche Bates, which opened at Garden Theatre on February 5, 1901, and closed in June. Twenty-four years old during the show's run, Johnston persisted as a theatre actor for another ten years and made his first film, a Pathé Frères short entitled The Reporter in 1911. Continuing to perform in numerous other short films (virtually all productions of the early 1910s were between one and three reels in length), the following year he joined filmmakers' exodus to the newly formed West Coast motion picture mecca of Hollywood. Seen in at least eight films in 1912, he made twenty-six in 1913 and sixteen in 1914, with six of the 1914 titles extended to feature length, including the five DeMilles, in first of which, The Man on the Box, a comedy-drama released in July, he had a prominent supporting role as a character named Count Karloff. Playing the title character's best friend, Steve, who is lynched as a cattle thief in The Virginian, the director's first major success, was next, in September. There were two titles in November, The Man from Home and Rose of the Rancho, and his fifth DeMille, The Ghost Breaker, opened in December. Johnston was also the male lead in one of the earliest movie serials, filmed in 1914 and released in mid-January 1915, Runaway June, which spotlighted, in the title role, Norma Phillips, whose short-lived nickname, during her brief (1913–17) film career, came from the appellation of her 1914 feature, Our Mutual Girl.

Forty years old in 1916, Johnston enjoyed a brief period as a mature leading man, second-billed to such stars as the "Sweetheart of American Movies", Mabel Taliaferro, in God's Half Acre, and twenty-two-year-old Norma Talmadge in Fifty-Fifty, which cast him as her wealthy husband. By the end of the 1920s, however, his roles began to decrease in importance and he was back in fourth-, fifth- and sixth-billed supporting parts. In his final silent feature, 1928's Driftwood, he is fourth, playing, at age 52, third male support to leading lady Marceline Day. As talkies began, his roles declined to unbilled bit parts, with a single billing, in twenty-third place (as Jack W. Johnston), in the 1941 comedy-drama Buy Me That Town. There were two more appearances for Cecil B. DeMille, in 1939's Union Pacific and 1942's Reap the Wild Wind but, in contrast to his stature in 1914, Johnston, now in his sixties, is barely glimpsed in fleeting unbilled bits. The features containing the final three of those transient glimpses, 1946's Night and Day, Lady Luck, and The Locket were all released posthumously following his death in July.

J. W. Johnston died in Los Angeles at age 69 years, 9 months, but the few obituaries which noted his passing gave his age as 70. In a three-sentence notice, Variety, in its August 7, 1946 weekly issue, indicated that he died at 70 on August 1 (rather than the actual date of July 29) and that he "moved to Hollywood in 1912 and remained active until a few days before his death".

== Partial filmography ==
- The Man on the Box (1914)
- The Virginian (1914)
- Where the Trail Divides (1914)
- Rose of the Rancho (1914)
- The Ghost Breaker (1914)
- Sealed Valley (1915)
- Out of the Drifts (1916)
- Molly Make-Believe (1916)
- The Moment Before (1916)
- Destiny's Toy (1916)
- Fifty-Fifty (1916)
- The Cost of Hatred (1917)
- The Eternal Mother (1917)
- The Land of Promise (1917)
- The Adopted Son (1917)
- As Men Love (1917)
- The Spirit of '17 (1918)
- Uncle Tom's Cabin (1918)
- On the Quiet (1918)
- The Woman the Germans Shot (1918)
- Out of the Shadow (1919)
- The Test of Honor (1919)
- The Twin Pawns (1919)
- Why Women Sin (1920)
- The Kentuckians (1921)
- The Ruling Passion (1922)
- Cardigan (1922)
- The Valley of Silent Men (1922)
- Backbone (1923)
- Unseeing Eyes (1923)
- The Greatest Love of All (1924)
- Desert Valley (1926)
- The Black Diamond Express (1927)
- Flying Luck (1927)
- The Sawdust Paradise (1928)
- Driftwood (1928)
- Take Me Home (1928)
