= A Roadside Impresario =

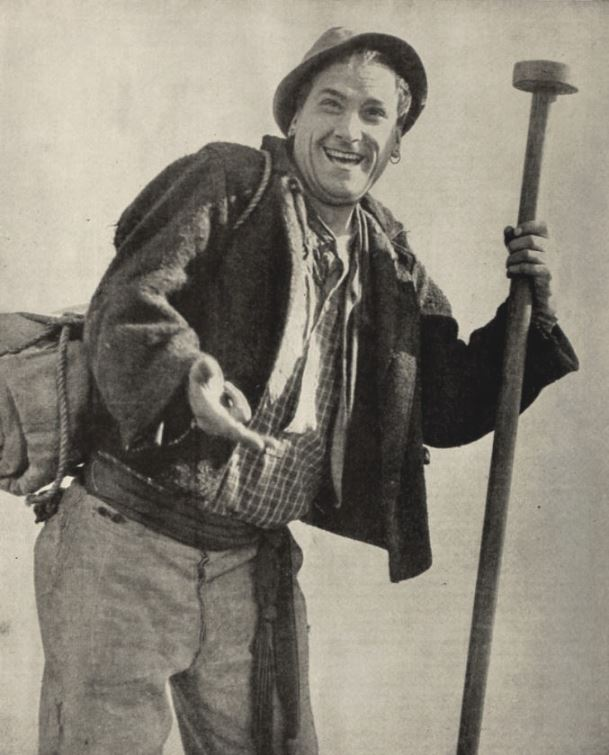
- Film still
- Directed by: Donald Crisp
- Screenplay by: George Beban
- Starring: George Beban; Jose Melville; Julia Faye; Harry De Vere; Harrison Ford; Fred Huntley
- Cinematography: Faxon M. Dean
- Production company: Pallas Pictures
- Distributed by: Paramount Pictures
- Release date: June 18, 1917
- Running time: 50 minutes
- Country: United States
- Language: Silent (English intertitles)

A Roadside Impresario is a 1917 American silent drama film directed by Donald Crisp and written by George Beban. The film stars George Beban, Jose Melville, Julia Faye, Harry De Vere, Harrison Ford, and Fred Huntley. The film was released on June 18, 1917, by Paramount Pictures.

== Cast ==
- George Beban as Giuseppe Franchini
- Jose Melville as Francesca Franchini
- Julia Faye as Adelaide Vandergrift
- Harry De Vere as J. Stewart Vandergrift
- Harrison Ford as Craig Winton
- Fred Huntley as John Slade
- William A. Carroll as Gibbs
- Adele Farrington as Lizzie Cosgrove
