= Jules of the Strong Heart =

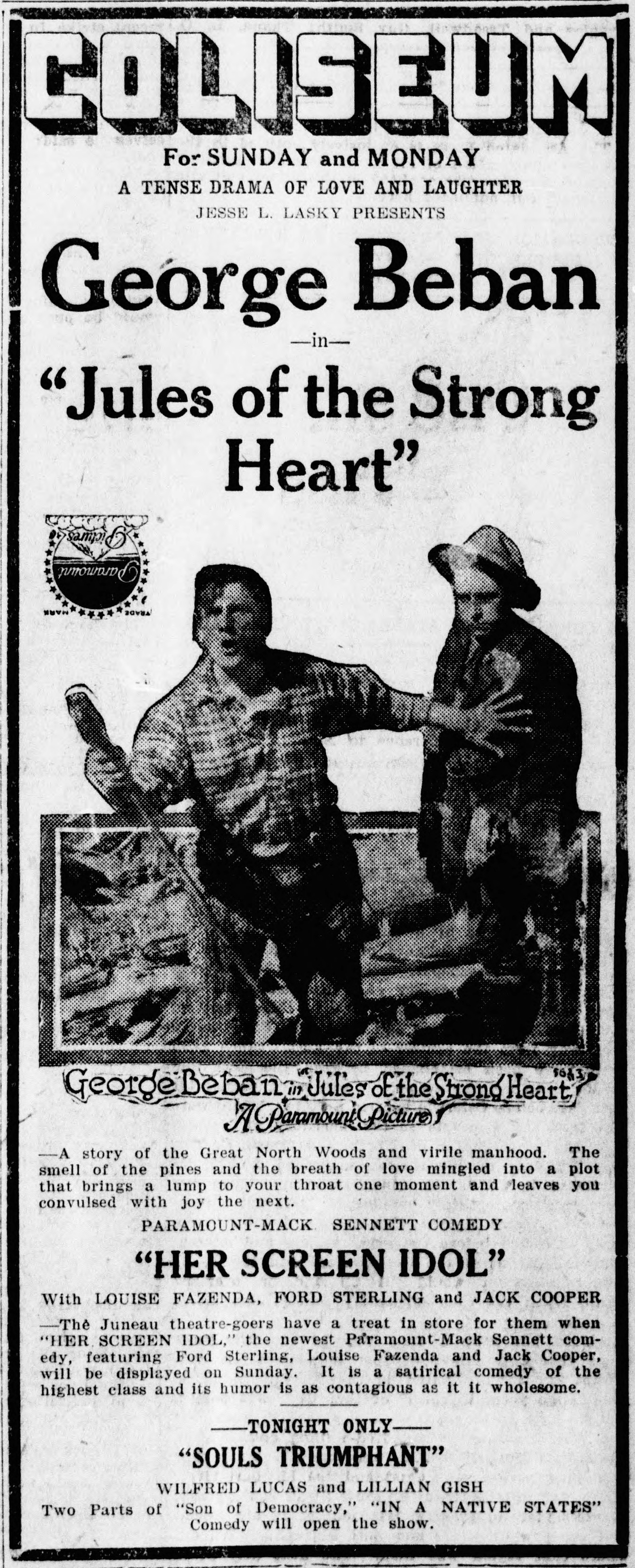
- Newspaper advertisement
- Directed by: Donald Crisp
- Screenplay by: William Merriam Rouse (story); Frank X. Finnegan (scenario); Harvey F. Thew (scenario)
- Produced by: Jesse L. Lasky
- Starring: George Beban; Helen Jerome Eddy; Charles Ogle; Raymond Hatton; Guy Oliver; Ernest Joy
- Cinematography: Faxon M. Dean
- Production companies: Famous Players–Lasky Corporation; Jesse L. Lasky Feature Play Company
- Distributed by: Paramount Pictures
- Release date: January 14, 1918
- Running time: 50 minutes
- Country: United States
- Language: Silent (English intertitles)

Jules of the Strong Heart is a lost 1918 American silent drama film directed by Donald Crisp and written by William Merriam Rouse, Frank X. Finnegan' and Harvey F. Thew. The film stars George Beban, Helen Jerome Eddy, Charles Ogle, Raymond Hatton, Guy Oliver, and Ernest Joy. The film was released on January 14, 1918, by Paramount Pictures.

== Plot ==
As described in a film magazine, Jules Lemaire comes to the lumbering country with an infant. He secures a position logging and the interest of Joy Farnsworth, daughter of foreman Tom Farnsworth. Big Jim Burgess becomes jealous of Jules and spreads false stories regarding the baby. A storm prevents the foreman from going to get the pay. This arouses the men and some want to attack Farnsworth. Jules offers to go get the money and Burgess goes along. Burgess leads Jules astray, and demands the note for the money, but Jules refuses to give it up. Burgess then tortures Jules, but is interrupted by the arrival of Joy and Herbert Sommerville, the latter having come for his baby. Burgess is captured, the money needed for the pay is secured, and the trio arrive just in time to save Farnsworth and his assistant from the wrath of the men. Sommerville takes his baby with him and Joy declares her love for Jules.

== Cast ==
- George Beban as Jules Lemaire
- Helen Jerome Eddy as Joy Farnsworth
- Charles Stanton Ogle as Tom Farnsworth
- Raymond Hatton as Ted Kendall
- Guy Oliver as Big Jim Burgess
- Ernest Joy as Jack Liggitt
- Horace B. Carpenter as Louis the 'Red Fox'
- Edward Martin as Head of the Trapping Company
- James Neill as Herbert Sommerville

== Reception ==
Like many American films of the time, Jules of the Strong Heart was subject to cuts by city and state film censorship boards. For example, the Chicago Board of Censors required, in Reel 4, a cut of the slugging of Jules and, in Reel 5, two scenes of tortured man's side streaked with blood and two riot scenes.
