= Flying Luck =

1927 film directed by Herman C. Raymaker

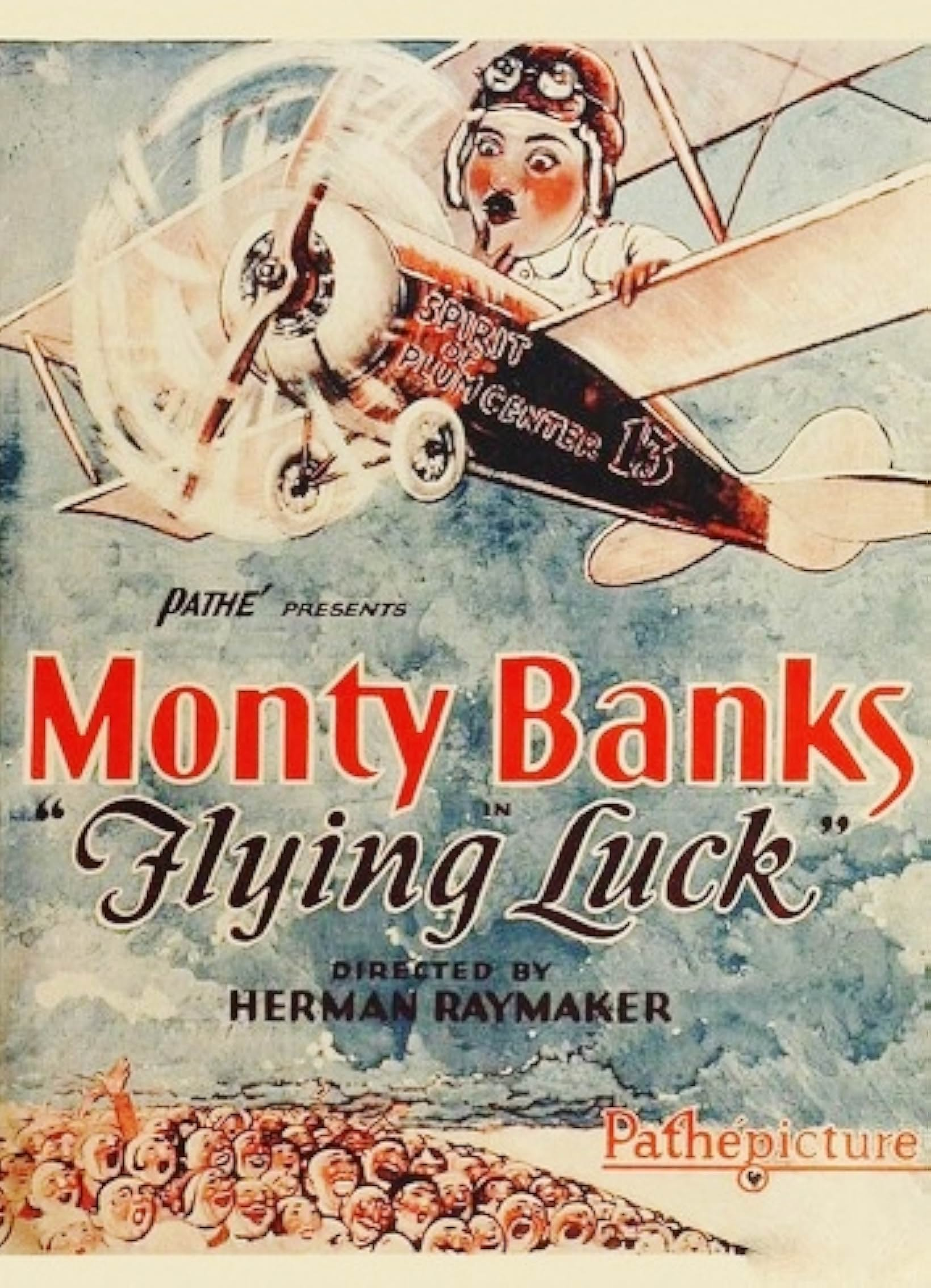
- Directed by: Herman C. Raymaker
- Written by: Monty Banks; Charles Horan; Paul Perez; Matt Taylor
- Produced by: Monty Banks
- Starring: Monty Banks; Jean Arthur; Jack W. Johnston
- Cinematography: James Diamond
- Edited by: William Holmes
- Production company: Monty Banks Enterprises
- Distributed by: Pathé Exchange
- Release date: December 4, 1927
- Running time: 71 minutes
- Country: United States
- Languages: Silent; English intertitles

Flying Luck (1927)

Flying Luck is a 1927 American silent comedy film directed by Herman C. Raymaker and starring Monty Banks, Jean Arthur and Jack W. Johnston.

== Cast ==
- Monty Banks as The Boy
- Jean Arthur as The Girl
- Jack W. Johnston as The Colonel
- Kewpie Morgan as The Sergeant
- Eddy Chandler as The Corporal
- Silver Harr as The Orderly
- Louise Carver as A Passerby

== Bibliography ==
- Brent E. Walker. Mack Sennett’s Fun Factory: A History and Filmography of His Studio and His Keystone and Mack Sennett Comedies, with Biographies of Players and Personnel. McFarland, 2013.
