= The Loves of Ricardo =

1926 American film

- Directed by: George Beban
- Written by: George Beban; G. Marion Burton
- Produced by: George Beban
- Starring: George Beban
- Cinematography: Allen G. Siegler; Lester Lang
- Edited by: George Beban
- Production company: George Beban Productions
- Distributed by: Film Booking Offices of America
- Release date: September 4, 1928
- Running time: 8 reels
- Country: United States
- Language: Silent (English intertitles)

The Loves of Ricardo is a 1926 melodrama American film. It was recut and re-released in 1928. It featured a live performed sequence. It is a love story about a man who goes to Florida where he has invested in real estate, is kidnapped, and escapes after training a parrot. He is then reunited with his love. George Beban wrote, directed, and stars in the film.

It was advertised as an exquisite motion picture epic that was tender, beautiful, and moving, eliciting tears, laughter, and relief. "All right for those who can stand Beban's super-sentimentality," summarized The Educational Screen.

== Cast ==
- George Beban as Ricardo
- Soliga Lee as Annetta
- Amille Milane as Annetta in live sequence
- Jack Singleton as Steve
- Monte Collins Jr. as Steve in live sequence
- Albano Valerio as Marco
- Mika Aldrich as Flora
- Signor Froondi
- Goilio Cortesi
- E. E. MacLeod Jr.

== Preservation ==
The Loves of Ricardo is currently presumed lost. In February of 2021, the film was cited by the National Film Preservation Board on their Lost U.S. Silent Feature Films list.
