= The Greatest Love of All (1924 film) =

1924 film

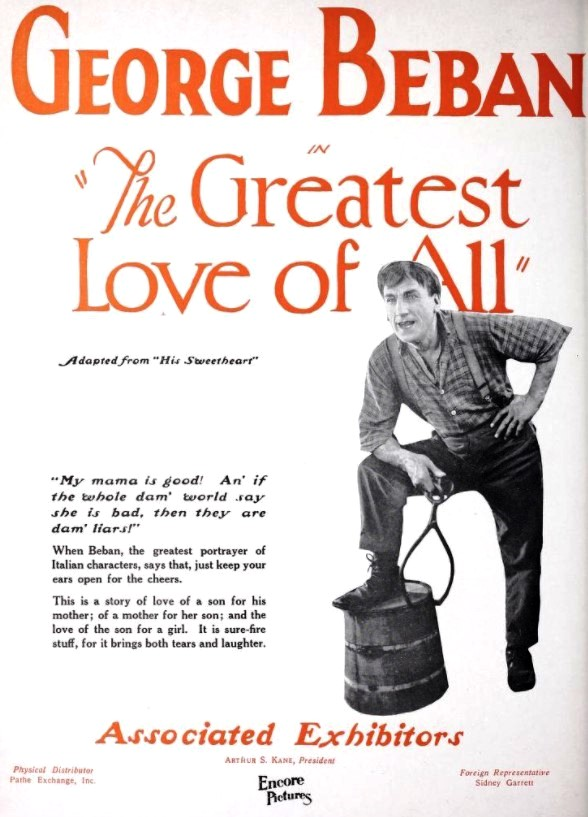
- Directed by: George Beban
- Written by: George Beban
- Produced by: George Beban
- Starring: George Beban; Jack W. Johnston
- Production company: George Beban Productions
- Distributed by: Associated Exhibitors
- Release date: November 10, 1924
- Running time: 70 minutes
- Country: United States
- Languages: Silent; English intertitles

The Greatest Love of All is a 1924 American silent drama film directed by George Beban and starring Beban and Jack W. Johnston.

== Cast ==
- George Beban as Joe, the iceman
- Jack W. Johnston as District Attorney Kelland
- Wanda Lyon as Mrs. Godfrey Kelland
- Baby Evelyn as Their daughter
- Nettie Belle Darby as Marie Simpkin, the maid
- Orestes A. Zangrilli a s The Cobbler
- Mary Skurkoy as Trina, his daughter
- Maria Di Benedetta as His 'Sweetheart'
- William Howatt as Presiding Judge
- John Koch Newman as Attorney for the Defense
- George Humbert as Interpreter
- Robert M. Doll as Court Officer

== Bibliography ==
- Connelly, Robert B. The Silents: Silent Feature Films, 1910-36, Volume 40, Issue 2. December Press, 1998.
- Munden, Kenneth White. The American Film Institute Catalog of Motion Pictures Produced in the United States, Part 1. University of California Press, 1997.
