= One Man in a Million =

1921 film

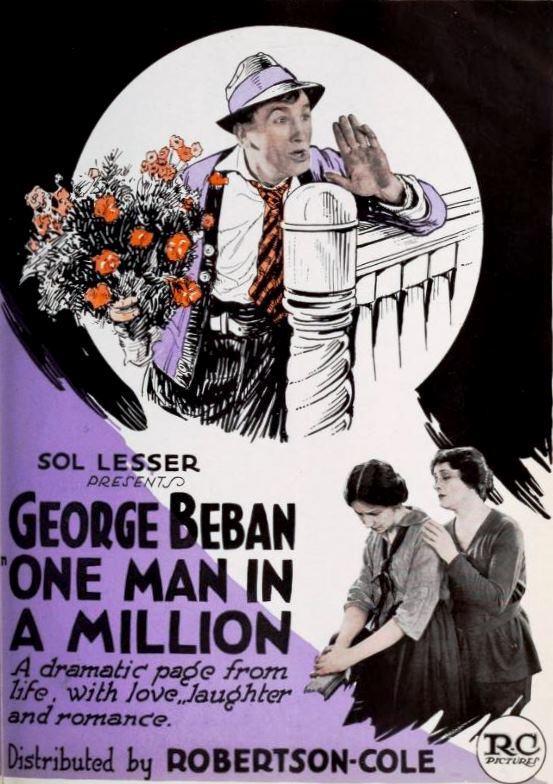
- Directed by: George Beban
- Written by: George Beban; Dorothy Yost
- Produced by: Sol Lesser
- Starring: George Beban; Helen Jerome Eddy; Irene Rich
- Cinematography: Ross Fisher
- Production company: Sol Lesser Productions
- Distributed by: Robertson-Cole Distributing Corporation
- Release date: February 13, 1921
- Running time: 60 minutes
- Country: United States
- Languages: Silent; English intertitles

One Man in a Million is a 1921 American silent drama film directed by George Beban and starring Beban, Helen Jerome Eddy and Irene Rich.

== Cast ==
- George Beban as Lupino Delchini
- Helen Jerome Eddy as Flora Valenzi
- Irene Rich as Madame Maureveau
- Lloyd Whitlock as Clyde Hartley
- George B. Williams as Gustave Koppel
- Jennie Lee as Mrs. Koppel
- Wade Boteler as Immigration Inspector
- George Beban Jr. as The Belgian Waif
- Barbara Maier as Little Girl

== Bibliography ==
- Connelly, Robert B. The Silents: Silent Feature Films, 1910-36, Volume 40, Issue 2. December Press, 1998.
- Munden, Kenneth White. The American Film Institute Catalog of Motion Pictures Produced in the United States, Part 1. University of California Press, 1997.
