= One More American =

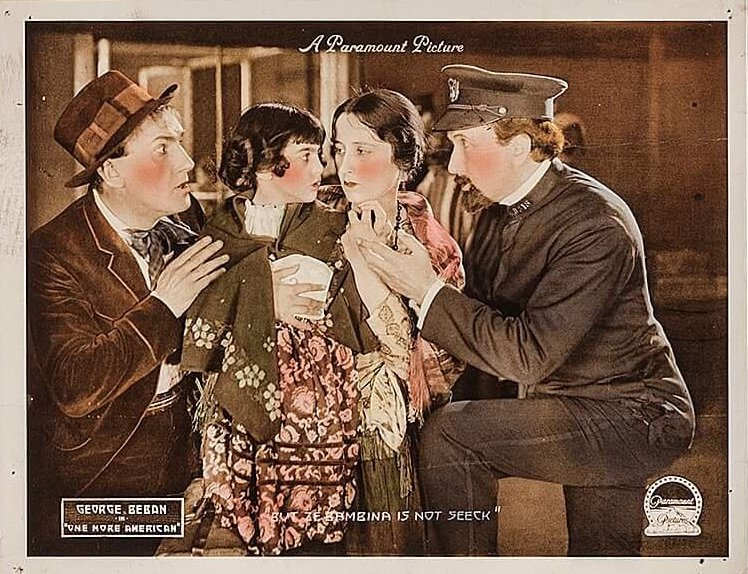
- Lobby card for the film
- Directed by: William C. deMille
- Screenplay by: Olga Printzlau; William C. deMille
- Produced by: Jesse L. Lasky
- Starring: George Beban; Marcia Manon; Mae Giraci; Helen Jerome Eddy; Raymond Hatton; Jack Holt
- Cinematography: Charles Rosher
- Production companies: Famous Players–Lasky Corporation; Jesse L. Lasky Feature Play Company
- Distributed by: Paramount Pictures
- Release date: February 25, 1918
- Running time: 50 minutes
- Country: United States
- Language: Silent (English intertitles)

One More American is a 1918 American silent drama film directed by William C. deMille and written by Olga Printzlau and William C. deMille. The film stars George Beban, Marcia Manon, Mae Giraci, Helen Jerome Eddy, Raymond Hatton, and Jack Holt. The film was released on February 25, 1918, by Paramount Pictures. It is not known whether the film currently survives, which suggests that it is a lost film.

== Plot ==
As described in a film magazine, after five years separation Luigi Riccardo learns that his wife Maria and daughter Tessa are going to join him in America. Although legally not a citizen, in his heart Luigi regards his adopted country with reverence and his refusal to pay graft to Boss Regan results in his wife and daughter being held at Ellis Island upon their arrival. Through the assistance of some detectives from the district attorney's office, the Regan scheme is exposed and Luigi's wife and daughter are permitted to enter the country and join him.

== Cast ==
- George Beban as Luigi Riccardo
- Marcia Manon as Maria Riccardo (credited as Camille Ankewich)
- Mae Giraci as Tessa Riccardo
- Helen Jerome Eddy as Lucia
- Raymond Hatton as Bump Rundle
- Jack Holt as Sam Potts
- Horace B. Carpenter as Mike Regan
- Hector Dion as Dr. Ross
- May Palmer as Mrs. Ross
- Ernest Joy as Mr. Fearing
- Pietro Buzzi as Piano Player (credited as Signor Buzzi)
