= Jeanne Carpenter =

American actress (1917–1994)

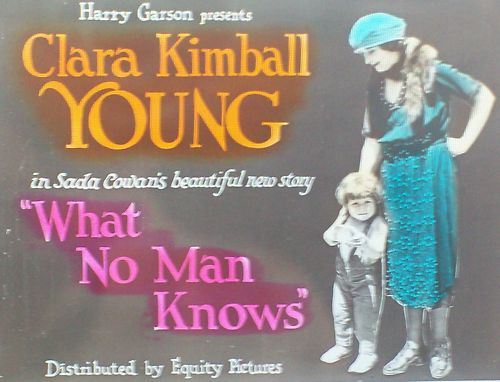
- Lantern slide with Jeanne Carpenter and Clara Kimball Young in What No Man Knows (1921)
- Born: Theo-Alice Jeanne Carpenter; February 1, 1916; Kansas City, Missouri, US
- Died: January 5, 1994 (aged 76); Oxnard, California, US
- Occupation: Actress
- Years active: 1919–1945
- Spouse(s): Robert Drysdale (1937–1947); Robert Alvin Grimes (July 13, 1949 – January 5, 1994)
- Children: 5

Theo-Alice Jeanne Carpenter (February 1, 1917 – January 5, 1994) was an American child actress of the silent era whose career in the entertainment industry spanned 74 years.

== Biography ==
Born in Kansas City, Missouri, Carpenter started her film career at the age of three. Her film debut came in Daddy Long Legs. At age four, she traveled around the United States appearing in theaters on a promotional tour of her films. Her fame grew in the early-1920s as she made a series of successful appearances in films such as, Helen's Babies with Baby Peggy, and The Sign of the Rose. Maturity led to a change of roles for Carpenter. Becoming a young woman, she moved into character roles. She had occasional adult roles through 1940s, then she retired from film business.

== Personal life ==
Carpenter married Robert Grimes in 1949. She had four daughters and one son from two marriages. In 1964, she and all five children performed in the Plaza Players' production of Gypsy in Oxnard, California.

On January 5, 1994, Carpenter died of emphysema in Oxnard, California, aged 77.

== Filmography ==
Year	Title	Role	Notes
1919	Daddy-Long-Legs		Uncredited
1919	Desert Gold		
1920	The Luck of Geraldine Laird	Child	Credited as Theo-Alice Carpenter
1920	The Courage of Marge O'Doone		
1920	The Dwelling Place of Light		
1920	Peaceful Valley		Uncredited
1920	The Way Women Love		
1920	The Adventures of Bill and Bob		Alternative title: The Adventures of Bill and Bob
1920	The Man from Nowhere		Alternative title: Rider from Nowhere
1921	Fighting Fate		Credited as Jean Carpenter
1921	The Nut	Cupid Telephone Operator	Uncredited
1921	Through the Back Door	Jeanne (age 5)	
1921	A Kiss in Time		
1921	The Stampede	Mary, Wagner's Little Daughter	Credited as Jean Carpenter
1921	What No Man Knows	Mazie	
1922	In the Name of the Law		With Baseball Hall of Famer Honus Wagner to her rescue
1922	The Sign of the Rose	Dorothy Griswold	
1922	Tess of the Storm Country		Uncredited
1923	Ashes of Vengeance	Anne	
1923	The Midnight Alarm	Susan	Credited as Jean Carpenter
1923	Why Women Remarry	Mildred Talbot	
1924	By Divine Right	Trent Baby	Alternative title: The Way Men Love
1924	A Boy of Flanders	Alios Cogez	Credited as Jean Carpenter
1924	Helen's Babies	Budge	Credited as Jean Carpenter
1926	Prince of Tempters	Flower girl	
1931	City Lights	Extra in restaurant scene	Uncredited; Alternative title: City Lights: A Comedy Romance in Pantomime
1937	Glamorous Night	Gypsy Girl	Uncredited
1945	Week-End at the Waldorf	Telephone Operator	Uncredited, (final film role)
