= Marcia Manon =

American actress

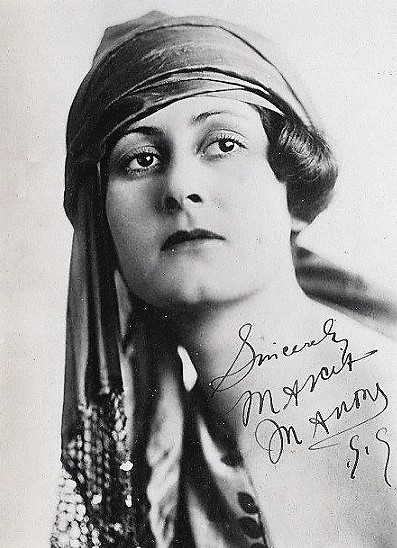
- Born: Marcia Elizabeth Harrison; October 28, 1896; Paris, France
- Died: April 12, 1973 (aged 76); Victorville, California
- Other name: Camille Ankewich
- Occupation: actress
- Years active: 1916–1929
- Spouse: J. L. Frothingham (1921–1925;?his death)

Marcia Manon (born Marcia Elizabeth Harrison, October 28, 1896 – April 12, 1973) was a film actress active during the silent film era of the 1910s and 1920s. She was a supporting player who worked with stars Mary Pickford, John Barrymore, Ethel Clayton, William S. Hart, and Wallace Reid. She retired from movies with the coming of sound film.

She bore a resemblance to actress Clara Kimball Young and was sometimes billed as Camille Ankewich.

Manon died at Victorville, California in 1973.

== Filmography ==
- The Prison Without Walls (1917) (as Camille Ankewich)
- The Hostage (1917) (as Camille Ankewich)
- Stella Maris (1918)
- One More American (1918) (as Camille Ankewich)
- Amarilly of Clothes-Line Alley (1918) (uncredited)
- Old Wives for New (1918)
- The Claw (1918)
- Missing (1918)
- The Savage Woman (1918)
- The Girl Who Came Back (1918)
- The Border Wireless (1918)
- Maggie Pepper (1919)
- The Test of Honor (1919)
- Captain Kidd, Jr. (1919)
- A Daughter of the Wolf (1919)
- The Woman Michael Married (1919)
- The Lottery Man (1919)
- In Old Kentucky (1919)
- Life's Twist (1920)
- The Forbidden Thing (1920)
- All's Fair in Love (1921)
- Ladies Must Live (1921)
- The Masquerader (1922)
- Skin Deep (1922)
- The Woman He Loved (1922)
- Justice of the Far North (1925)
- The Greater Glory (1926)
- Heaven on Earth (1927)
- The Vanishing Pioneer (1928)
- They Had to See Paris (1929)
- Love, Live and Laugh (1929)
