= George Beban =

American actor

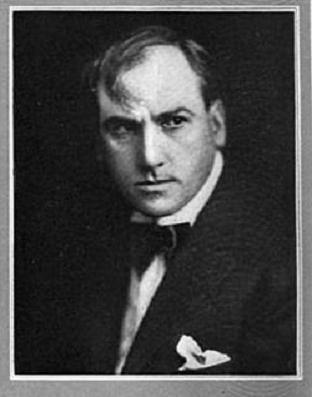
- George Beban (The Theatre Magazine; 1915)
- Born: December 13, 1873; San Francisco, California, US
- Died: October 5, 1928 (aged 54); Los Angeles, California
- Occupations: Actor; director; writer; producer
- Years active: 1895–1926
- Spouse: Edith MacBride

George Beban (December 13, 1873 – October 5, 1928) was an American actor, director, writer and producer. Beban began as a child performer in San Francisco, California, and became a well-known vaudevillian and stage actor in the 1890s and 1900s. He was best known for his portrayal of Italian immigrant characters, including his starring roles in the play The Sign of the Rose and the 1915 silent film classic The Italian. Though strongly associated with his Italian immigrant roles, Beban was born in San Francisco, could not speak a word of Italian [not likely: in Dalmatia Italian was largely spoken, his father's name – Rocco – is in fact Italian, and Telegraph Hill was an Italian area of San Francisco], and was the son of parents from Dalmatia (in modern-day Croatia) and Ireland.

== Early years ==
Beban was born in San Francisco, California in 1873. He grew up on San Francisco's Telegraph Hill and was one of four sons of Rocco Beban, a Dalmatian immigrant, and Johanna Dugan, from County Cork, Ireland. At age eight, he began a stage career singing with the Reed and Emerson Minstrels. His talent as a singer led to the young Beban acquiring the nickname "The Boy Baritone". He then acted in juvenile roles for the California Theater stock company in San Francisco.

== Broadway and vaudeville ==
At age 22, Beban began a career as a Broadway theater actor in New York. He appeared in several musical comedies and performed with Weber & Fields and with Marie Cahill. Beban's stage credits include Parrot and Monkey Time (1896), a minstrel feature at Sam T. Jack's Theater; A Modern Venus (1898), a burlesque playing at Sam T. Jack's Theater; A Trip to Buffalo (1902); Nancy Brown (1903); Fantana (1905); Moonshine (1905–06), a production of the Marie Cahill company; About Town (1906), a musical comedy by the Lew Fields All Star Company about life in Paris; The Great Decide (1906); The Girl Behind the Counter (1907–1908); The American Idea (1908), a musical comedy by George M. Cohan; Hokey-pokey (1912); and Anna Held's All Star Variete Jubilee (1913–1914).

George M. Cohan wrote The American Idea for Beban to play the lead role of Pierre Souchet (and Trixie Friganza as the co-star). Beban had previously played French characters in Marie Cahill's production Ben Bolt, and in Lew Fields' About Town. In 1907, the Chicago Tribune wrote the following about Beban's French character: "The best work of the entire entertainment is accomplished by George Beban as the excitable Frenchman ... The actor makes this Count Boti a veritable Frenchman, every intonation and inflection, every motion, look, and gesture being exact."

For many years, Beban was typecast as a French character actor. Beban later recalled, "No one will ever know what an awful time I had to get away from French character. I had to live, and for French character parts I could name my own salary, but for anything else I wasn’t worth as much as a chorus man." No longer wishing to play parts that cast him as "a Sunday comic supplement," Beban begged to be given serious parts where he could portray a more rounded human being.

== "The Sign of the Rose" ==
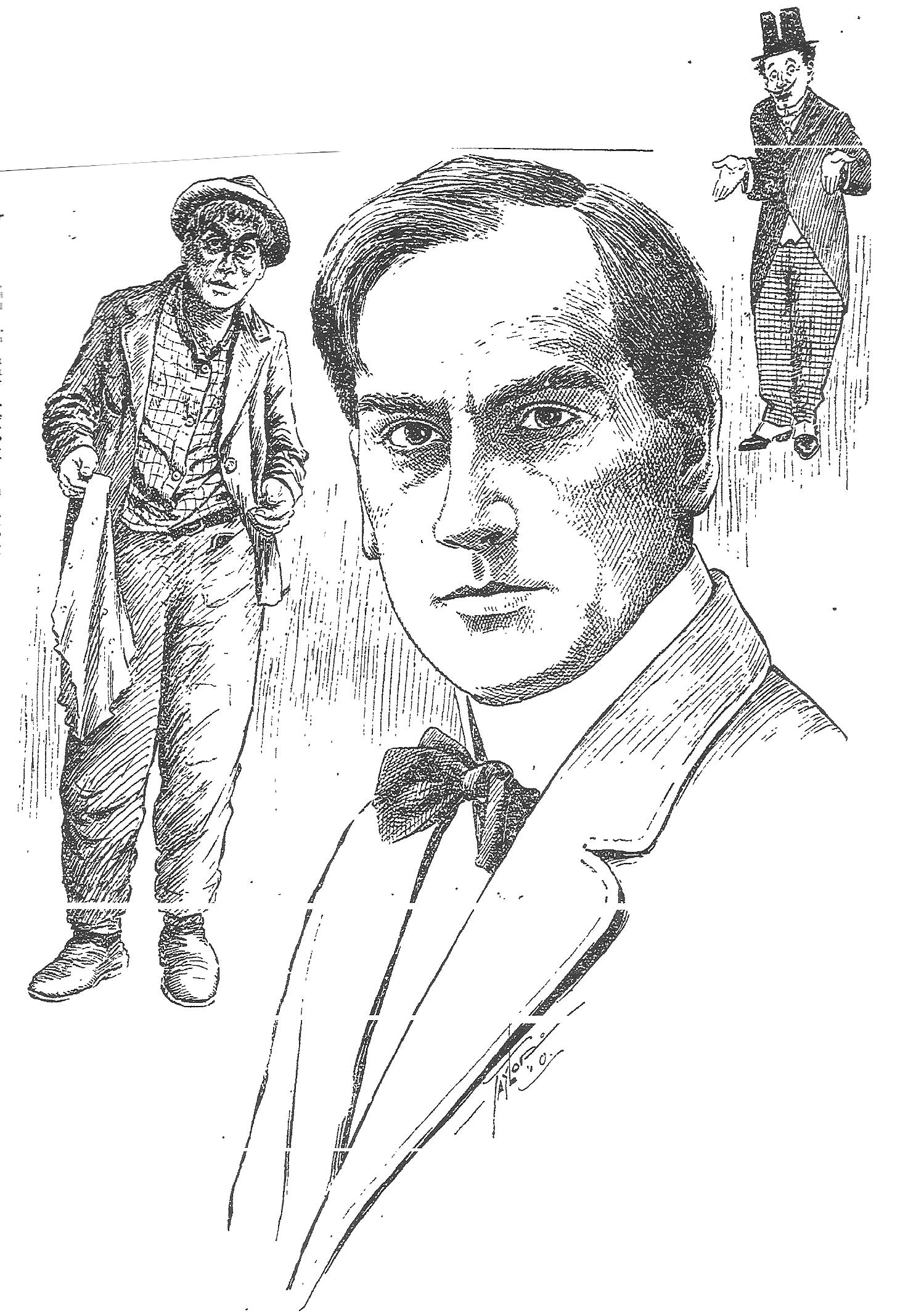
Beban as depicted in a 1910 newspaper article

Eventually, Beban escaped the French characters by taking on a different ethnic caricature – the Italian immigrant. He studied the language and mannerisms of the Italian immigrants by spending weeks observing Italian workers building a tunnel between Manhattan and New Jersey. He even purchased clothes from the workers that he later used for his character in The Sign of the Rose. In an earlier interview with the San Francisco Chronicle, Beban said he had developed some ability to imitate Italian speech as a boy teasing and stealing fruit from local Italian gardeners and grape growers.

The study paid off with Beban's release of a vaudeville sketch in which he played the part of an Italian laborer mourning the death of his child. The sketch was written by Beban and was called The Sign of the Rose. It grew from a vaudeville sketch into a full-length play and was eventually made into a feature film.

In 1911, The New York Times wrote that the story was "generally lacking in plausibility" and having "much that is conventional and machine made." However, the Times found the play to be "a very good character study indeed"—at least while Beban was on the stage. The Times called the play "an excellent vehicle for Mr. Beban, who has long been regarded as a clever delineator of Italian roles." The reviewer said of Beban's performance: "Here he portrays very beautifully the simplicity, gentleness, sweetness, and, when occasion arises, the native ferocity of the ignorant but wellmeaning foreigner, who is conscious of the obstacles which he confronts on account of his poverty, and the contempt and suspicion under which he labors because of the crimes of evildoers of his own nationality."

In 1910, the Los Angeles Times published a lengthy feature story on Beban in which it wrote:

"George Beban is probably the only American actor who has consecrated his individual efforts to the portrayal of a certain type. Beban says he is going to play, and continue to play, 'The Italian in America.' ... Just at present Beban's talents are finding abundant expression in 'The Sign of the Rose,' a remarkable Orpheum headliner, in which, as Pietro Massena, this character actor delineates the loves and sorrows of a poor Italian emigrant."

When The Sign of the Rose played in Milwaukee, Wisconsin, The Milwaukee Sentinel wrote: "It is a beautiful piece of character depiction, and throughout, from the first entrance to the last curtain call, Mr. Beban never steps from the picture, never mars the imaginative creation he has formed. The grip is there, and the sketch is one of the best in the vaudeville field today."

While touring with The Sign of the Rose, Beban spoke of the contributions of the Italian in civilization and noted:

"The swarming port of Naples courses him out to us every day, its traffic lines beating like a great throbbing artery of life. In the main he is poor and despised, and sometimes, though not as often as the sensationalists of the police courts would have us believe, he is rejected. But even at his worst he contains a fund of humanity which it is almost impossible to duplicate in any other people as a whole. His passions are so manifest that they are the very essence of the theatre. He loves intensely, he adopts children, he is fiery in his friendships and hates alike, and his experiences in getting Americanized furnish a far greater fund of comedy than the wearisome peanut-stand mirth to which the 'scene-in-one' artists have accustomed us."

Owing to the success of "The Sign of the Rose," Beban was cast for most of the next decade in Italian character roles. In 1917, Beban revealed to a reporter the irony that he could not speak a word of Italian. Beban explained:

"I understand the tongue when it is spoken – I couldn't be associated with it for so many years and not recognize and translate it – but I have never attempted to talk it myself. ... To portray the type of Italian that I do all one needs is knowledge of the actions, mannerisms, etc., of the character. Not knowing the language, from the viewpoint that the Italian speaks it, I am thus able to make my characterization more understandable to the American audience. In other words, I Americanize him for the United States consumption – stage purposes."

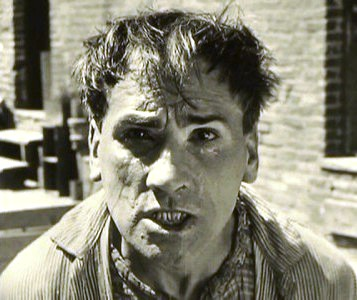
George Beban in The Italian (1915)

== "The Italian" ==
In 1915, Beban made his debut in the motion picture business as the lead actor in Thomas H. Ince's production, The Italian. In the film, Beban played the role of Pietro "Beppo" Donnetti, an Italian gondolier who comes to the United States to make his fortune but instead winds up working as a shoeshiner and experiencing tragedy while living with his wife and child in a tenement on New York's Lower East Side. The Italian proved to be a popular and critical success. Grace Kingsley in the Los Angeles Times praised Beban's work:

"There are possibilities in the role of Pietro, in 'The Italian' ... that a less clever character artist than George Beban might overlook ... The story is full of human interest, requiring a full understanding of the character, and Beban by look and gesture is at all times in fullest sympathy with the difficult role."

A newspaper in Indiana also praised Beban's performance:

"George Beban, who has the difficult role of Pietro Donnetti, gives a piece of character work that is truly marvelous. This artist has developed mimicry to its highest form of expression. His mobile countenance mirrored every emotion so perfectly, each varying mood was portrayed so truly, that it was hard to believe that this man was naught but a pantomimist. The upward glance when the heart was bitten again by the fangs of emotion, the hysterical joy of the Latin nature when in high spirits, all these phrases were delineated by this artist in a way that moved and thrilled."

Historical accounts, following the film's release on DVD, have also been kind to Beban. In 2008, The New York Times praised Beban's "powerful lead performance" which it described as follows:

"The audience is drawn to identify with Beppo, even though he remains in many respects an appalling ethnic caricature: dark, brooding, vengeful. That Barker [the director] and Beban are able to create so much sympathy for Beppo, despite their own, occasionally quite obvious condescension to the character, is a mark of emerging maturity in the movie business; no longer are films dealing in one-dimensional 'types.'"

A reviewer for the publication Bright Sights wrote: "Projecting overwhelming grief, Beban reveals some hefty acting chops."

A review in DVD Talk concluded that Beban's performance was able to overcome the film's melodramatic premise: "Beppo is a delightful character ... His rage after being robbed was another standout moment. The camera does a very tight closeup ... and his anger and fear are almost palatable."

== Motion pictures ==
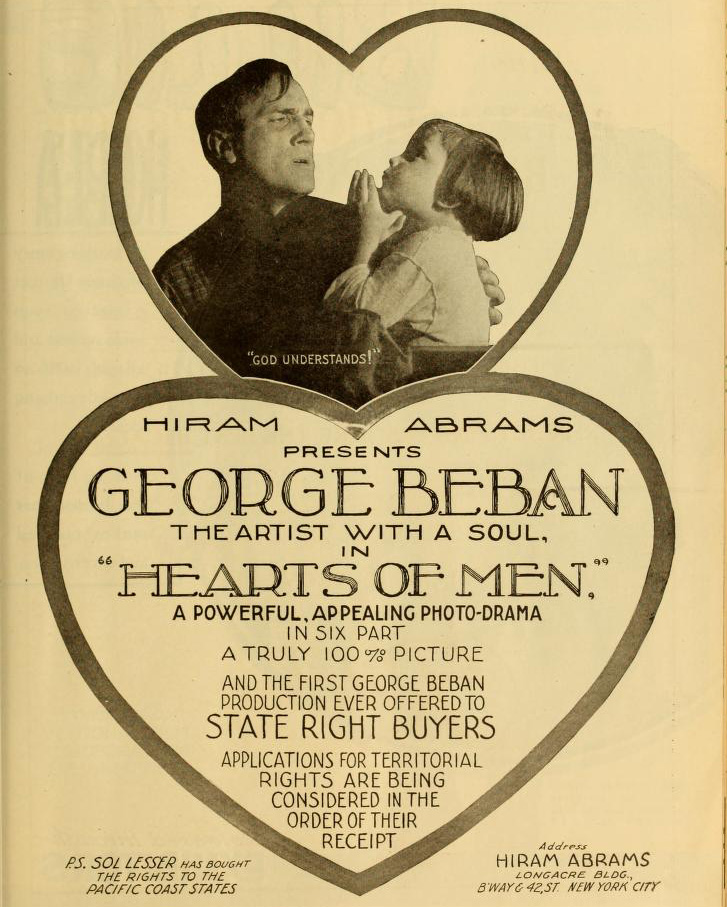
Hearts of Men (1919)

Beban's second feature, also released in 1915, was The Alien, a film version of his long-running play, The Sign of the Rose. In the decade after the release of The Italian and The Alien, Beban played the leading role in a number of Hollywood motion pictures, including Lost in Transit, The Land of the Free, Jules of the Strong Heart, One More American, Hearts of Men, The Greatest Love of All, One in a Million, and The Loves of Ricardo.

In addition to acting, Beban also worked as a director, producer and writer on such films as The Loves of Ricardo (actor, writer, director, editor and producer), The Greatest Love of All (actor, story, director and producer), and One Man in a Million (actor, story and director).

In May 1921, the City of Los Angeles threw a parade in honor of Beban. Beban's train was greeted at the Southern Pacific station, and he was taken to a waiting automobile filled with roses. A long line of decorated cars formed a parade to Los Angeles City Hall, where Mayor Meredith P. Snyder presented Beban with a huge floral key to the city. The events were part of the celebration for the opening of Beban's latest film, One in a Million.

== Family ==
Beban was married to Edith MacBride, a stage actress who appeared with Beban in Moonshine (1905–06), About Town (1906), The Girl Behind the Counter (1907–08), The American Idea (1908), and Anna Held's All Star Variete Jubilee (1913–14). They also appeared together in the 1915 motion picture The Alien. Their son, George Beban Jr., was born in 1914 and performed as a child actor with his father in the films One in a Million (1921), Hearts of Men (1919), and The Alien (1915).

In December 1926, Beban's wife died in New York.

== Later years and death ==
Following the death of his wife, Beban retired from the motion picture business. In his retirement, he built a large home in Playa del Rey, Los Angeles, California.

In 1927, Beban began assisting aspiring actors to break into the motion picture business. He described his goal in an interview with the Los Angeles Times:

"There is no agony so poignant as the feeling that one has the spark of genius with no opportunity to satisfy that ambition that goes with it. I know, because I have had my own struggles. The stage and screen have been good to me. I have accumulated all the money I need, for a few years at least, and I am going to devote at least a year of my life to helping young men and women of talent who are denied the chance to display it."

In 1928, Beban died from injuries sustained when he was thrown from a horse while on vacation at the June Lodge dude ranch in Big Pine, California. He died from complications from the accident at the California Lutheran Hospital in Los Angeles.

== Selected filmography ==
- The Italian (1915)
- The Alien (1915)
- The Pawn of Fate (1916)
- Pasquale (1916)
- The Marcellini Millions (1917)
- A Roadside Impresario (1917)
- The Cook of Canyon Camp (1917)
- Lost in Transit (1917)
- When It Strikes Home (1918)
- Jules of the Strong Heart (1918)
- One More American (1918)
- Hearts of Men (1919)
- One Man in a Million (1921)
- The Sign of the Rose (1922)
- The Greatest Love of All (1924)
- The Loves of Ricardo (1926) .... Ricardo Bitelli
