= The Marines Are Coming =

1934 film by David Howard

- Directed by: David Howard
- Written by: Colbert Clark (story); James Gruen (screenplay); John Rathmell (story)
- Produced by: Nat Levine (producer)
- Starring: William Haines; Conrad Nagel; Esther Ralston
- Narrated by: Sean Durf
- Cinematography: Ernest Miller; William Nobles
- Edited by: Thomas Scott
- Production company: Mascot Pictures
- Distributed by: Mascot Pictures
- Release date: November 20, 1934
- Running time: 74 minutes
- Country: United States
- Language: English

The Marines Are Coming is a 1934 American action drama film directed by David Howard and starring William Haines, Conrad Nagel and Esther Ralston. It was produced and distributed by the independent Mascot Pictures. It was the final film acting role of Haines who had a major success in the 1926 film Tell it to the Marines.

== Plot summary ==
A brash marine lieutenant with a history of active service overseas and heavy debts in the United States is assigned to a new post with his new company under the command of his former rival. The marine falls in love with his commanding officer's fiancée and romances her away from him. The day before their wedding, the fiancée calls it off after the marine is involved with an incident in Tijuana. The fiancée leaves for Central America during the Banana Wars to join her father, who is a diplomat, and the disgraced marine quits but re-enlists as a private. Assigned to a post in Central America, the marine discovers he must rescue his rival, who has been captured by the rebels plotting to overthrow the territorial governor, his former fiancée's father.

== Cast ==
- William Haines as Lt. William "Wild Bill" Traylor
- Conrad Nagel as Capt. Edward "Ned" Benton
- Esther Ralston as Dorothy Manning
- Armida as Rosita Hernández Consuelo Ibera y Buenaventura
- Edgar Kennedy as Sgt. Buck Martin
- Hale Hamilton as Colonel Gilroy
- George Regas as The Torch (uncredited)
- Smiley Burnette as Sailor Delivering Flowers to Bill

== Soundtrack ==
- "Semper Fidelis" (Music by John Philip Sousa)
- Armida - "Brazilian Baby" (Written by Gus Edwards)
