= William Haines =

American actor and interior designer (1900–1973)

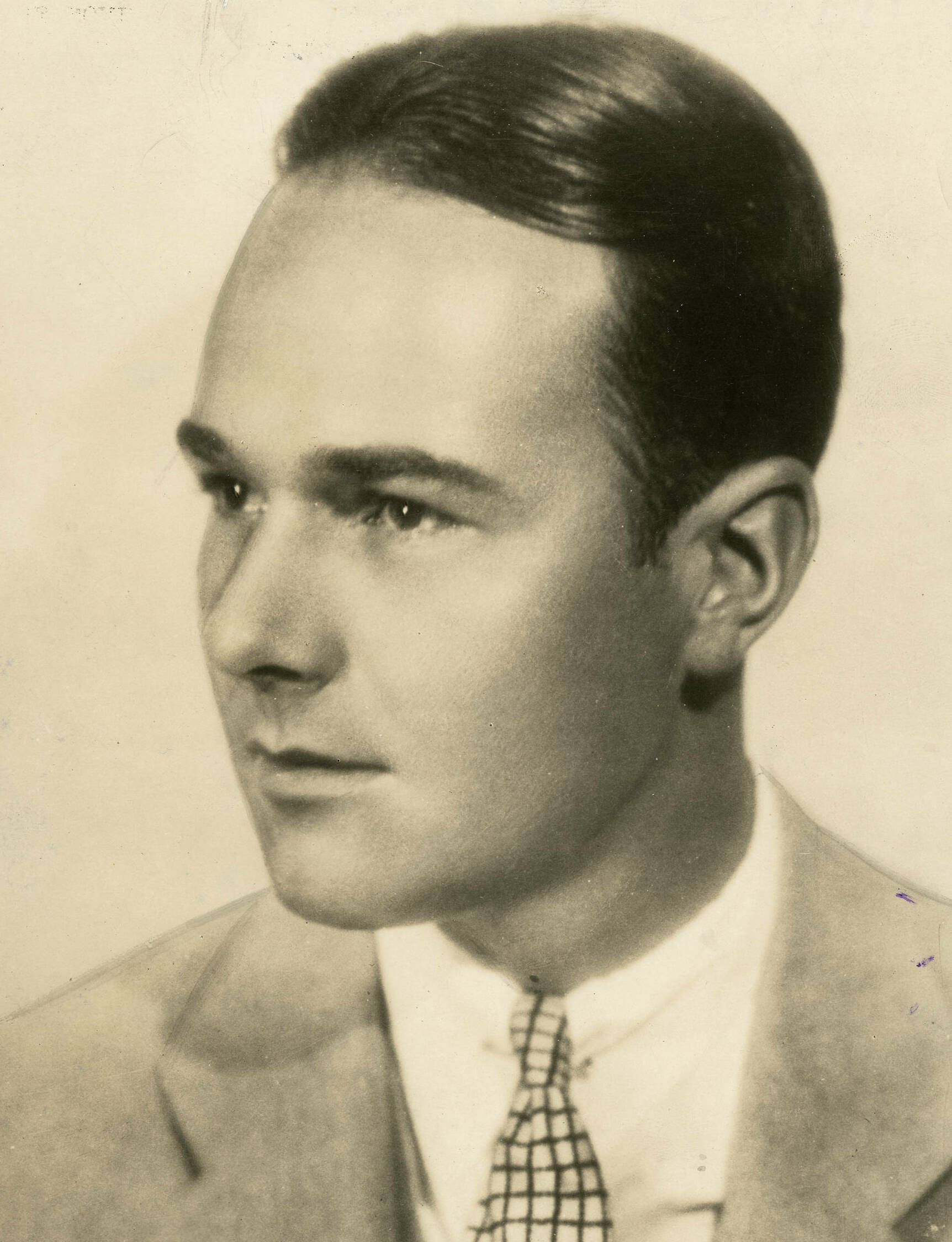
- Publicity photo of Haines released for Alias Jimmy Valentine (1928)
- Born: Charles William Haines; January 2, 1900; Staunton, Virginia, U.S.
- Died: December 26, 1973 (aged 73); Santa Monica, California, U.S.
- Resting place: Woodlawn Memorial Cemetery, Santa Monica
- Occupations: Actor; interior designer
- Years active: 1922–1973
- Partner: Jimmie Shields (1926–1973)
- Website: williamhaines.com

Charles William "Billy" Haines (January 2, 1900 – December 26, 1973) was an American actor and interior designer.

Haines was discovered by a talent scout and signed with Goldwyn Pictures in 1922. (Note: In 1924, Goldwyn Pictures became part of Metro-Goldwyn-Mayer.) His career gained momentum when he received favorable reviews for his role in the silent film The Midnight Express in 1924. He was cast in the 1926 film Brown of Harvard and his performance solidified his screen persona as a wisecracking, arrogant leading man. By the end of the 1920s, Haines had appeared in a string of successful films and was a popular box-office draw.

Haines' acting career was cut short by the studios in the 1930s due to his refusal to deny his homosexuality. He quit acting in 1935 and started a successful interior design business with his life partner Jimmie Shields, and his work was widely patronized by friends in Hollywood. Haines died of lung cancer in December 1973 at the age of 73.

== Early life ==
Haines was born on January 2, 1900 (he claimed he was born on January 1) in Staunton, Virginia, the third child of George Adam Haines, a cigar maker, and Laura Virginia Haines (née Matthews). Two older siblings died in infancy. He had four younger siblings: Lillian, born in 1902; Ann, born in 1907; George, Jr., born in 1908; and Henry, born in 1917. He was baptized at the Trinity Episcopal Church in Staunton at the age of eight, where he later sang in the choir. He became fascinated with stage performance and motion pictures at an early age, spending hours watching early silent films in local theatres.

Haines ran away from home at the age of 14, accompanied by an unidentified young man whom Haines referred to as his "boyfriend". The pair went first to Richmond and then to Hopewell, which had a reputation for immorality. They got jobs working at the local DuPont factory, producing nitrocellulose for $50 a week. To supplement their income, they opened a dance hall, which may have also served as a brothel. Haines' parents, frantic over his disappearance, tracked him through the police to Hopewell. Although a minor, Haines did not return home with them. He remained in Hopewell and sent money back home to help support the family. The couple remained in Hopewell until most of the town was destroyed by fire in 1915. Haines then moved to New York City. Whether his boyfriend accompanied him is unclear.

Following the bankruptcy of the family business and the mental breakdown of George Haines Sr., the family moved to Richmond in 1916. William Haines moved there in 1917 to help support them. With his father recovered and employed, Haines returned to New York City in 1919, settling into the burgeoning gay community of Greenwich Village. He worked a variety of jobs and was for a time the kept man of an older woman before becoming a model. Talent scout Bijou Fernandez discovered Haines as part of the Goldwyn Pictures' "New Faces of 1922" contest, and the studio signed him to a $40-a-week contract (~$700 in 2022 terms). He traveled to Hollywood with fellow contest winner Eleanor Boardman in March of that year.

== Career ==
=== Acting ===
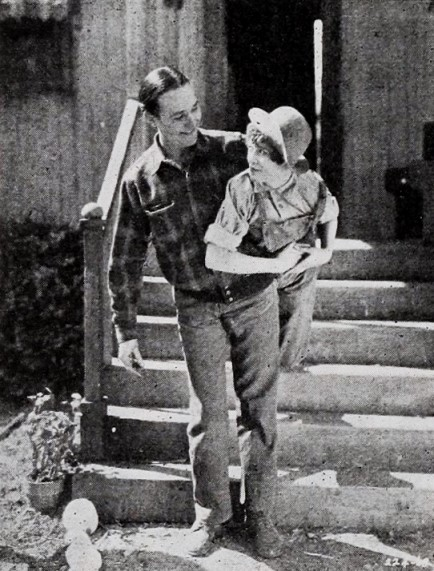
Still from the film Mike (1926) with Haines and Sally O'Neil

Haines' career began slowly, as he appeared in extra and bit parts, mostly uncredited. His first significant role was in Three Wise Fools (1923). He attracted positive critical attention and the studio began building him up as a new star. However, he continued to play small, unimportant parts at Goldwyn. When his home studio lent him to Fox in 1923 for The Desert Outlaw, he got the opportunity to play a significant role. In 1924, MGM lent Haines to Columbia Pictures for a five-picture deal. The first of these, The Midnight Express (1924), received excellent reviews, and Columbia offered to buy his contract. The offer was refused and Haines continued in bit roles for Goldwyn. Haines scored his first big personal success with Brown of Harvard (1926) opposite Jack Pickford and Mary Brian. It was in Brown that he crystallized his screen image, a young arrogant man who is humbled by the last reel. He returned repeatedly to that formula for the next several years.

On a trip to New York in 1926, Haines met James "Jimmie" Shields. Haines convinced Shields to move to Los Angeles, promising to get him work as an extra. The pair soon began living together and viewed themselves as a committed couple, though newspapers did not mention their relationship.

Haines found box-office success with Little Annie Rooney (1925), co-starring Mary Pickford, and Show People (1928), costarring Marion Davies. He was a top-five box-office star from 1928 to 1932. He made a successful transition into "talkies" in the part-talking film Alias Jimmy Valentine (1928). He was forced to take elocution lessons for the film; he compared the coming of sound to "the discovery of clap in a nunnery." His first all-talking film, Navy Blues, was released the following year. He starred in Way Out West in 1930. The 1930 Quigley Poll, a survey of film exhibitors, listed Haines as the top box-office attraction in the country.

In 1933, Haines was arrested in a YMCA with a sailor he had picked up in Los Angeles' Pershing Square. Louis B. Mayer, the studio head at MGM, delivered an ultimatum to Haines: choose between a sham lavender marriage, his relationship with Shields or his relationship with the sailor. Haines chose Shields and they remained together in a private relationship for 47 years. Mayer then fired Haines and terminated his contract. He made a few minor films at Poverty Row studios and soon retired from acting. His final films were made in 1934 with Mascot Pictures, Young and Beautiful and The Marines Are Coming.

Haines continued to receive offers for film roles. During production of Sunset Boulevard (1950), he was offered a cameo role in the film, which he declined. He later said, "It's a rather pleasant feeling of being away from pictures and being part of them because all my friends are. I can see the nice side of them without seeing the ugly side of the studios."

=== Interior design ===
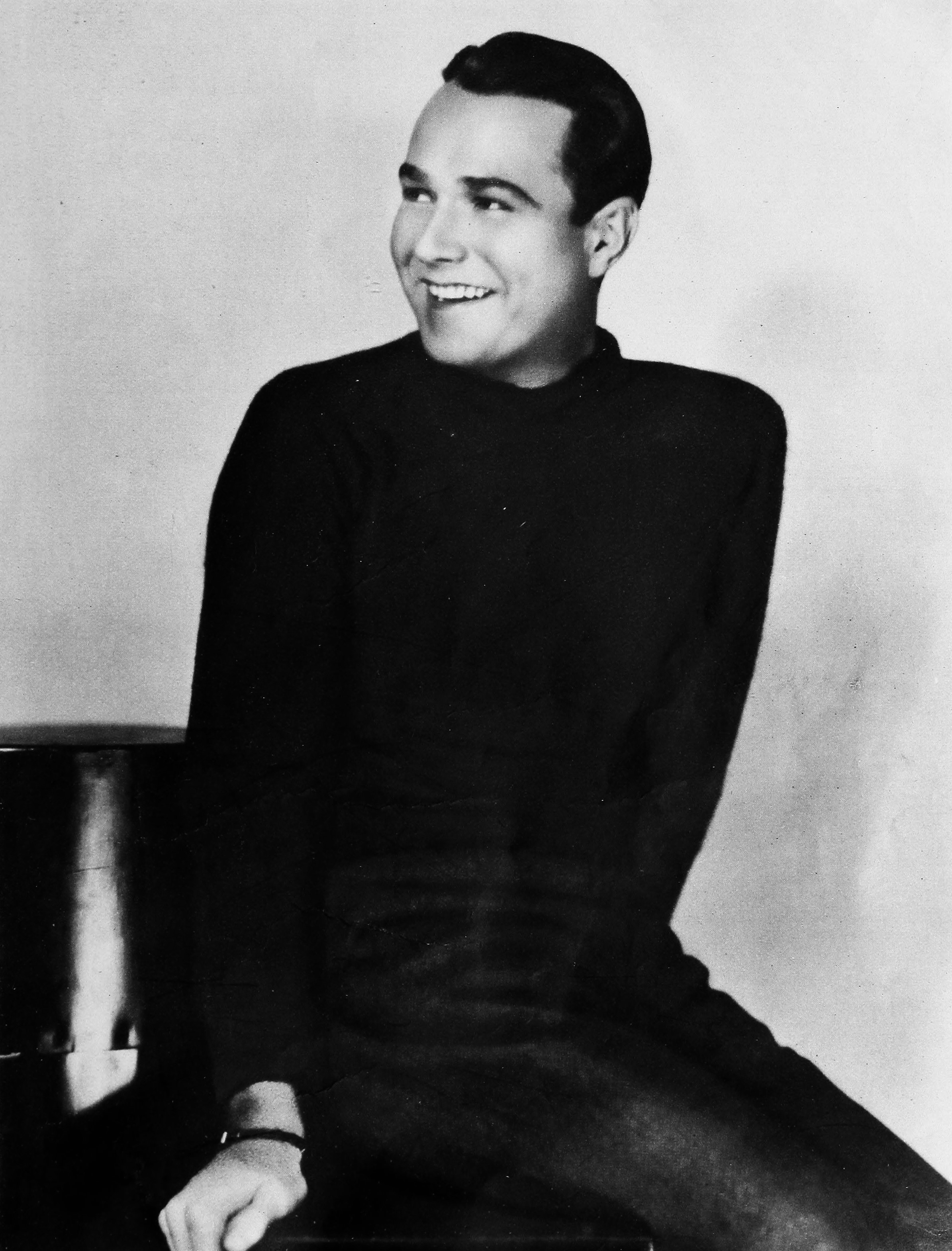
Portrait of Haines featured in Screenland magazine, February 1931

Haines and Shields began a successful dual career as interior designers and antique dealers. Among their early clients were friends such as Joan Crawford, Gloria Swanson, Carole Lombard, Marion Davies, and George Cukor. After a neighbor accused the two of propositioning her son, about 30 local residents including members of a group called "The White Legion" dragged the two men from their home in El Porto near the city of Manhattan Beach (this was before El Porto became a part of that city) and beat them. The incident was widely reported at the time, but the Los Angeles County Sheriff’s office never brought charges against the attackers. The child molestation accusations against Haines and Shields were dismissed due to lack of evidence.

When Jack L. Warner remodeled his estate in 1937, he hired Haines as interior decorator. He also designed an office for Frank Sinatra and the Mocambo nightclub.

The couple finally settled in the west Los Angeles community of Brentwood. Except for a brief interruption when Haines served in World War II their business prospered until their retirement in the early 1970s.

Known for his impeccable taste in interior design and love for vintage pieces, Haines worked closely with his friend Joan Crawford — whom he teasingly called Cranberry — to renovate her Brentwood home. His unconventional choice of an all-white decor for her living room caused a sensation and helped launch his interior design career, working for Carole Lombard next. Later in 1956, he would decorate Crawford’s newly renovated two-floor apartment purchased with her new husband, Alfred Steele.

In the 1960s and 1970s, their clients included Betsy Bloomingdale and Ronald and Nancy Reagan when Reagan was governor of California. Haines and Ted Graber designed the interiors of Walter and Leonore Annenberg's "Sunnylands" estate in Rancho Mirage. The Annenbergs also hired Haines to work on the redecoration of Winfield House in London, where Walter was serving as U.S. Ambassador.

=== Notable interior design clientele ===
- Joan Crawford
- Gloria Swanson
- Carole Lombard
- Marion Davies
- George Cukor
- Jack L. Warner
- Betsy Bloomingdale
- Ronald and Nancy Reagan
- Walter Annenberg
- Constance Bennett
- Douglas Fairbanks Jr.
- Franchot Tone
- Claudette Colbert
- Leila Hyams
- Lionel Barrymore
- Tallulah Bankhead
- Frank Sinatra
- George Burns
- Barbara Stanwyck
- William Powell

General reference:

Celebrities including Cameron Diaz, Courteney Cox, Anne Heche and Ellen DeGeneres purchased pieces of Haines' furniture in 1999.

== Final years ==
Haines and Shields remained together until Haines' death. Joan Crawford described them as "the happiest married couple in Hollywood."

In 1972 Shields and Haines both travelled to Europe. Haines was diagnosed with lung cancer in the summer of 1973. By December, Haines's long-time doctor requested he move into St John's Hospital.

== Death ==
Haines died on December 26, 1973, at St. John's Hospital at 6:45 pm, of sudden cardiac arrest with his partner Shields beside him.

Following Haines's death, Shields struggled to cope. At 9:45 pm on March 6, 1974, Shields began drinking and died of acute barbiturate intoxication. He left a note, inscribed:

Goodbye to all of you who have tried so hard to comfort me in my loss of William Haines, whom I have been with since 1926. I now find it impossible to go it alone, I am much too lonely.

They are interred side by side in Woodlawn Memorial Cemetery in Santa Monica.

== Legacy ==
For his contribution to the motion-picture industry, William Haines has a star on the Hollywood Walk of Fame located at 7012 Hollywood Blvd.

William Haines Designs remains in operation, with main offices in West Hollywood and an additional showroom in New York.

In September 2023, Sunnylands Center & Gardens featured an exhibition titled "Variations to a Theme" dedicated to William Haines.

== Filmography ==
| Year | Title | Role | Notes |
|---|---|---|---|
| 1922 | Brothers Under the Skin | Bit part | Uncredited; Incomplete film |
| 1923 | Lost and Found on a South Sea Island | Extra | |
| 1923 | Souls for Sale | Pinkey – Assistant Director | |
| 1923 | Three Wise Fools | Gordon Schuyler | |
| 1924 | Three Weeks | Curate | |
| 1924 | True as Steel | Gilbert Morse | |
| 1924 | The Midnight Express | Jack Oakes | |
| 1924 | The Gaiety Girl | Owen Tudor St. John | Lost film |
| 1924 | Wine of Youth | Hal Martin | |
| 1924 | Circe, the Enchantress | William Craig | |
| 1924 | So This Is Marriage? | | Lost film |
| 1924 | The Wife of the Centaur | Edward Converse | Lost film |
| 1925 | A Fool and His Money | John Smart | Lost film |
| 1925 | Who Cares | Martin | |
| 1925 | The Denial | Lover in flashback | |
| 1925 | A Slave of Fashion | Dick Wayne | Lost film |
| 1925 | Fighting the Flames | Horatio Manly, Jr. | Incomplete film, missing final reel |
| 1925 | The Tower of Lies | August | Lost film |
| 1925 | Little Annie Rooney | Joe Kelley | |
| 1925 | Sally, Irene and Mary | Jimmy Dungan | |
| 1925 | MGM Studio Tour | Himself | Short subject made by MGM |
| 1926 | Mike | Harlan | Lost film |
| 1926 | The Thrill Hunter | Peter J. Smith | Incomplete film |
| 1926 | Memory Lane | Joe Field | |
| 1926 | Brown of Harvard | Tom Brown | |
| 1926 | Lovey Mary | Billy Wiggs | Incomplete film |
| 1926 | Tell It to the Marines | Private "Skeet" Burns | |
| 1927 | A Little Journey | George Manning | Lost film |
| 1927 | Slide, Kelly, Slide | Jim Kelly (fictionalized version of Mike "King" Kelly) | |
| 1927 | Spring Fever | Jack Kelly | |
| 1928 | West Point | Brice Wayne | |
| 1928 | The Smart Set | Tommy | |
| 1928 | Telling the World | Don Davis | |
| 1928 | Excess Baggage | Eddie Kane | Lost film |
| 1928 | Show People | Billy Boone | |
| 1928 | Alias Jimmy Valentine | Jimmy Valentine | Lost film |
| 1929 | The Duke Steps Out | Duke | Lost film |
| 1929 | A Man's Man | Mel | Lost film |
| 1929 | The Hollywood Revue of 1929 | Himself | |
| 1929 | Speedway | Bill Whipple | |
| 1929 | Navy Blues | Kelly | First Talkie |
| 1930 | The Girl Said No | Tom Ward | |
| 1930 | Free and Easy | Himself – A Guest | Alternative title: Easy Go |
| 1930 | Estrellados | Himself | |
| 1930 | Way Out West | Windy | |
| 1930 | Remote Control | William J. Brennan | |
| 1931 | A Tailor Made Man | John Paul Bart | |
| 1931 | The Stolen Jools | Bill Haines | |
| 1931 | Just a Gigolo | Lord Robert Brummel | Art director |
| 1931 | New Adventures of Get Rich Quick Wallingford | Wallingford | |
| 1932 | Fast Life | Sandy | |
| 1932 | Are You Listening? | Bill Grimes | |
| 1934 | Young and Beautiful | Robert Preston | Set decorator |
| 1934 | The Marines Are Coming | Lt. William "Wild Bill" Traylor | |

== In popular culture ==
Haines' story is told in the 1998 biography Wisecracker: The Life and Times of William Haines, Hollywood's First Openly Gay Star by William J. Mann. His designs are the subject of Peter Schifando and Haines associate Jean H. Mathison's 2005 book Class Act: William Haines Legendary Hollywood Decorator.

World of Wonder produced Out of the Closet, Off the Screen: The Life of William Haines, which aired on American Movie Classics in 2001.

In October 2015, Karina Longworth chronicled Haines in the episode William Haines and Hollywood's First Openly Gay Marriage, which she included in her 15-part series of MGM stories for her podcast You Must Remember This. Haines was voiced by actor Wil Wheaton.

Playwright Claudio Macor created the biographical drama The Tailor-Made Man in the mid-1990s in London, telling the story of Haines' discovery in a talent contest, his movie career, its curtailment by Louis B. Mayer, and Haines' re-invention as an interior designer. The play tells the story of his 47-year relationship with Jimmie Shields.(1926-1973) The play premiered at London's tiny Hen and Chickens theatre and quickly transferred to Battersea Arts Centre. Over the years the play has been produced at London's Cockpit Theatre, off-Broadway in New York, San Diego's Diversionary Theatre in California in 1995. It was revived in a successful anniversary production in 2017 at London's White Bear Theatre, directed by Bryan Hodgson. In 2013 a musical adaptation of The Tailor-Made Man opened at London's Arts Theatre in the West End with pop star Faye Tozer (Steps) as Marion Davies and Mike McShane as Mayer.

In 1994, The Tailor-Made Man was chosen for a workshop TV production for Thames Television Masterpiece Pilot Showcase, directed by Golden Rose of Montreux winner Chris Bould. Bould returned to direct the UK radio adaptation of the play starring Judd Hirsch as Mayer. In 2017, to tie-in with the anniversary production, the definitive playscript was published by theatrical publisher Oberon Books.
