= Show People =

1928 film by King Vidor

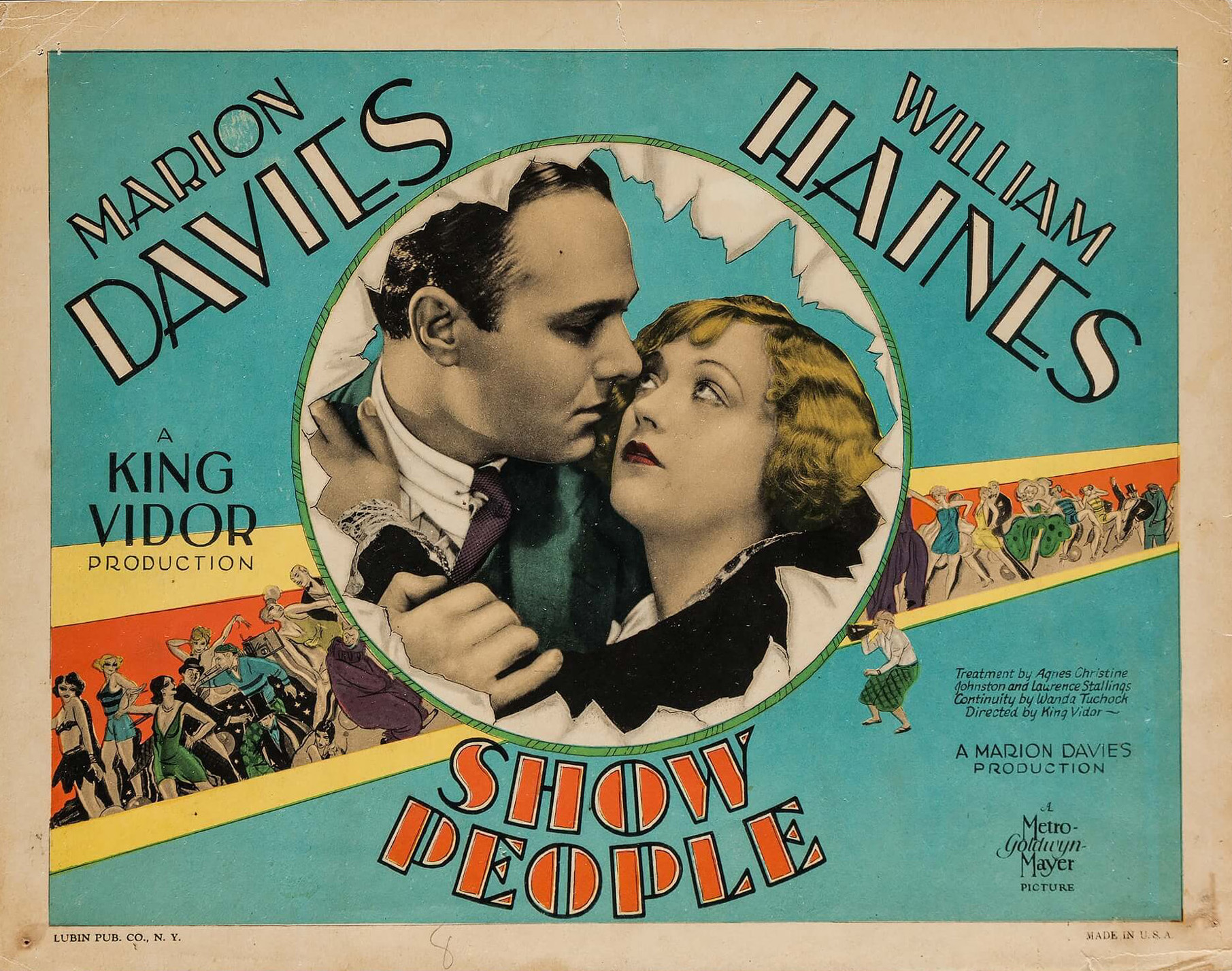
- Lobby card
- Directed by: King Vidor
- Written by: Agnes Christine Johnston (treatment); Laurence Stallings (treatment); Wanda Tuchock (continuity); Ralph Spence (titles)
- Produced by: Marion Davies; King Vidor; Irving Thalberg (uncredited)
- Starring: Marion Davies; William Haines
- Cinematography: John Arnold
- Edited by: Hugh Wynn
- Music by: William Axt (uncredited)
- Production company: Cosmopolitan Productions (uncredited)
- Distributed by: Metro-Goldwyn-Mayer
- Release date: November 20, 1928 (United States)
- Running time: 79 minutes
- Country: United States
- Languages: Sound film (Synchronized); English intertitles
- Budget: $431,000

Show People is a 1928 American synchronized sound comedy film directed by King Vidor. While the film has no audible dialog, it was released with a synchronized musical score with sound effects using both the sound-on-disc and sound-on-film processes. The film was a starring vehicle for actress Marion Davies and actor William Haines and included notable cameo appearances by many of the film personalities of the day, including stars Charlie Chaplin (who appears twice), Douglas Fairbanks, William S. Hart and John Gilbert, and writer Elinor Glyn. Vidor also appears in a cameo as himself, as does Davies (to a decidedly unimpressed reaction by herself in character as Peggy Pepper).

The film is a lighthearted look at Hollywood at the end of the silent film era (it was released the year after breakthrough talking picture The Jazz Singer), and is considered Davies' best role. Show People features no audible dialog but was released with a Movietone soundtrack with a synchronized musical score and sound effects. The film was re-released in the 1980s, with a new orchestral score by Carl Davis.

In 2003, Show People was selected for preservation in the United States National Film Registry by the Library of Congress as being "culturally, historically, or aesthetically significant". It was released on DVD on-demand as part of the Warner Archive collection. In February 2020, the film was shown at the 70th Berlin International Film Festival, as part of a retrospective dedicated to King Vidor's career.

== Plot ==
Show People (1928)

Peggy Pepper wants to be an actress in motion pictures, so her father drives her across the country from their home in Georgia to Hollywood. After some initial disillusionment, Peggy meets Billy Boone in a studio commissary; he tells her to show up at his set if she wants work. Peggy goes and gets sprayed with seltzer water at her first entrance. At first, she is shocked and dismayed to find she is doing slapstick comedy in low-budget "Comet" productions, but she decides to "take it on the chin". When the film is previewed for test audiences, Peggy becomes an instant success.

Soon enough, Peggy is signed to a contract by the prestigious "High Arts" studio, and leaves behind Billy and the comedy troupe. She arrives for a screen test at the High Arts Studio, where the director instructs her to pretend that her lover is dying. However, she is unable to cry on cue. The director then suggests for her to pretend you're in love with someone at the "crossroads of your lives." She successfully cries and the director and the crew break for lunch. Peggy's co-star André Telfair tries to comfort her, telling her she has graduated from "cheap comedy" and must develop a new star persona among the "elite" in Hollywood. Peggy agrees, and reinvents herself as "Patricia Pepoire", a descendant of Robert E. Lee.

Eventually, Peggy becomes a serious dramatic actress. Billy phones her at her mansion, inviting her for over dinner. She declines however as she's going on a date with André. While Peggy and André are shooting scenes for their film, Billy and the "Comet" comedy troupe arrive on location to film scenes for their picture. During a set-up for Peggy and André's next scene, Billy approaches Peggy. When she introduces André, Billy recognizes him as Andy, a former waiter who served him spaghetti. Offended, Peggy calls Billy a "cheap clown" and returns to shoot her scene.

While having a luncheon banquet, Peggy is summoned to the producer's office, where she is handed telegrams from theater bookers, all of whom deride her dramatic performances. Feeling she has lost popularity with audiences, the producer suggests Peggy return to her old screen persona but she declines.

Sometime later, Peggy is engaged to be married to André. On the day of her wedding, Billy pleads for her to not continue and remember the old days. Billy sprays another spritz of seltzer in her face, and when André walks in, Peggy accidentally throws a custard pie at him. Billy walks out, and Peggy, having been brought to her senses, decides to cancel the wedding.

While filming a World War I picture, and with King Vidor as director, Billy performs as a soldier. He is then stunned to believe Peggy is his co-star, and with the script written for him to kiss her, the two kiss passionately.

== Cast ==
- Marion Davies as Peggy Pepper
- William Haines as Billy Boone
- Dell Henderson as General Marmaduke Oldfish Pepper
- Paul Ralli as Andre Telfair
- Tenen Holtz as casting director
- Harry Gribbon as Jim, comedy director
- Kalla Pasha as comic chef
- Sidney Bracey as dramatic director
- Polly Moran as Peggy's maid
- Albert Conti as producer
- Ray Cooke as director's assistant (uncredited)
- Lillian Lawrence as comedy player at banquet (uncredited)
- Dorothy Vernon as comedy player at banquet (uncredited)
- Pat Harmon as studio Gateman (uncredited)
- Bert Roach as heavyset man in casting agency (uncredited)
- John Lowell as Director (uncredited)
- C. Aubrey Smith as Extra at Movie Preview (uncredited)
- Rolfe Sedan as portrait photographer (uncredited)
- Coy Watson as messenger boy (uncredited)
- Bess Flowers as undetermined role (uncredited)

Uncredited cameos

- Renée Adorée – at banquet
- George K. Arthur– at banquet
- Eleanor Boardman – clip from Bardelys the Magnificent
- Charlie Chaplin – outside movie theater
- Lew Cody – at High Art Studios
- Karl Dane – at banquet
- Marion Davies – cameo as herself in addition to starring as Peggy
- Douglas Fairbanks – at banquet
- John Gilbert – outside film studio, in clip from Bardelys the Magnificent, at banquet
- Elinor Glyn – at High Art Studios
- William S. Hart – at banquet
- Leatrice Joy – at banquet
- Rod La Rocque – at banquet
- Robert Z. Leonard – at High Art Studios in the car scene/parking lot scene
- Mae Murray – at banquet
- Louella Parsons – at banquet
- Aileen Pringle – at banquet
- Dorothy Sebastian – at banquet
- Norma Talmadge – at banquet
- Estelle Taylor – at banquet
- Claire Windsor – at banquet

== Production ==
Show People offers a comic look at 1920s Hollywood and stardom. The main character of Peggy Pepper, who becomes the self-important dramatic star, Patricia Pepoire, was based on the careers of silent divas Gloria Swanson and Mae Murray. When asked, Davies supposedly told Murray the character was based on Swanson. Davies also told Swanson the character was based on Murray, but Swanson did not care since she had no inclination to see the film. As such, the film is a comic romp for Davies. Lucille Ball repeatedly cited Davies as a major comedic influence, and Ball's subsequent facial techniques and comic behaviors evident in I Love Lucy are quite apparent in Davies' performance in this film. The character of Andre Paul Ralli was seen at the time as being a satire of John Gilbert.

The film has a remarkable number of cameo appearances from some of the top stars of the day, including Charlie Chaplin, Douglas Fairbanks, William S. Hart, Norma Talmadge, Leatrice Joy, Lew Cody, Eleanor Boardman, and others. Many agreed to appear out of friendship with Davies, Hearst, and director Vidor, and the positive publicity value of cooperating with Hearst and MGM also played a factor. Both Marion Davies and King Vidor also made cameo appearances as themselves.

In one of the film's more famous sequences, the script originally called for Davies to get hit in the face with a pie after being tricked appearing in a slapstick comedy movie. William Randolph Hearst objected to this, fearing for Marion Davies' dignity, and as a compromise, the scene was changed (without Hearst's knowledge) to have Davies get hit in the face with spray from a seltzer bottle.

Vidor had wanted James Murray for the role of Billy Boone, but he was unavailable. Davies jumped at the chance to cast close friend William Haines in the role and agreed to Haines's receiving billing above the title with her. This was the only silent film in which Davies shared star billing. Once again, the reviews raved about Davies' comedic touch, and the film was a huge hit at the box office.

The closing scene on the set of a war movie may be a nod to King Vidor's The Big Parade, a smash hit made in 1925, but more closely resembles the Davies film Marianne.

== Music ==
This film featured a theme song entitled "Cross Roads" which was composed by William Axt, David Mendoza and Raymond Klages.

The song plays throughout the movie, and was sung by English tenor Westell Gordon during the main title sequence and in the middle of the film.

== See also ==
- List of early sound feature films (1926–1929)
- List of United States comedy films
- Hollywood
- Souls for Sale
- A Trip to Paramountown
