= Proud Flesh (film) =

1925 film directed by King Vidor

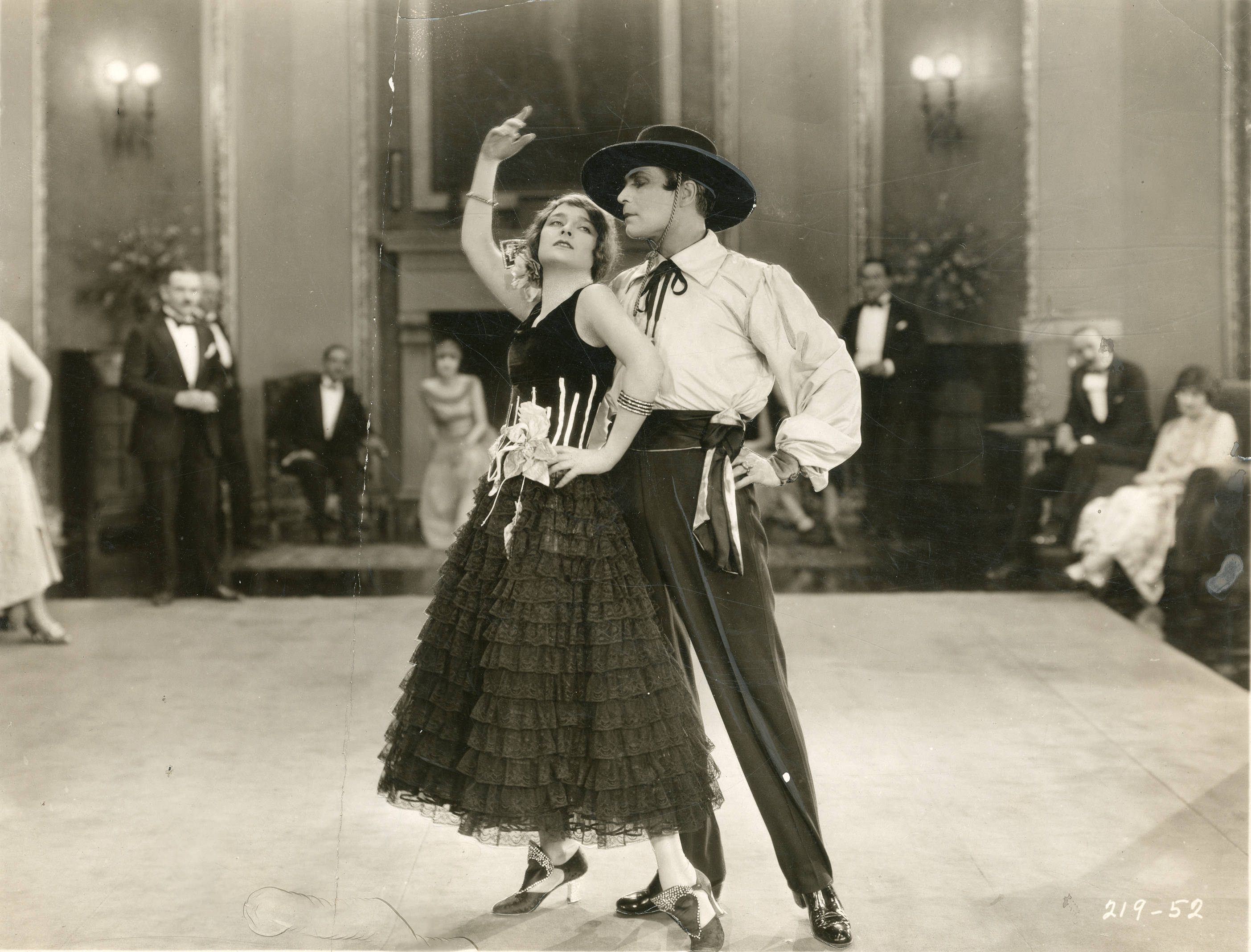
- Film still
- Directed by: King Vidor
- Written by: Harry Behn; Agnes Christine Johnston
- Based on: Proud Flesh by Lawrence Irving Rising
- Starring: Eleanor Boardman; Pat O'Malley; Harrison Ford
- Cinematography: John Arnold
- Distributed by: Metro-Goldwyn
- Release date: April 27, 1925
- Running time: 70 minutes
- Country: United States
- Language: Silent (English intertitles)

Proud Flesh is a 1925 American silent comedy-drama film directed by King Vidor and starring Eleanor Boardman, Pat O'Malley, and Harrison Ford in a romantic triangle.

== Plot ==
A San Francisco earthquake orphan, Fernanda is adopted and raised as a gentlewoman by relatives in Spain. As a girl she is courted by Don Jaime, but spurns him and returns to her gauche relatives in California. There she falls in love with a young bathtub manufacturer, Pat.

== Cast ==
- Eleanor Boardman as Fernanda
- Pat O'Malley as Pat O'Malley
- Harrison Ford as Don Jaime
- Trixie Friganza as Mrs. McKee
- William J. Kelly as Mr. McKee
- Rosita Marstini as Vicente
- Sōjin Kamiyama as Wong
- Evelyn Sherman as Spanish Aunt
- George Nichols as Spanish Uncle
- Margaret Seddon as Mrs. O'Malley
- Lillian Elliott as Mrs. Casey
- Priscilla Bonner as San Francisco Girl
- Joan Crawford in a bit part (uncredited)

== Reception ==
Mordaunt Hall, critic for The New York Times, called the film "a bright entertainment in which there are a slight touch of heart interest and plenty of amusement."

== Theme ==
Vidor made this film, the last of a cycle of four films, in the years just following World War I. The isolationist outlook of many Americans with regard to war-ravaged Europe prompted Vidor to locate the sources of “sexual experimentation and marital triangles” and other social infidelities of the Jazz Age in the Old World. Decadent European manners were contrasted with the fundamentally commonsense virtues that Vidor believed would prevail in the United States.

== Preservation ==
Copies of the film are held by George Eastman House and the UCLA Film & Television Archive.
