= A Trip to Paramountown =

1922 film

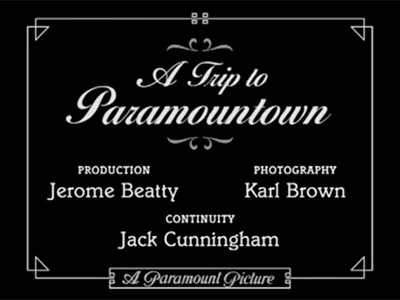
- Title card
- Directed by: Jack Cunningham
- Written by: Jack Cunningham
- Produced by: Adolph Zukor; Jesse L. Lasky
- Production company: Famous Players–Lasky Corporation
- Distributed by: Paramount Pictures
- Release date: July 10, 1922 (United States)
- Running time: 20 minutes
- Country: United States
- Language: Silent (English intertitles)

A Trip to Paramountown is a 1922 American short silent documentary film produced by Famous Players–Lasky and released through Paramount Pictures, to celebrate 10 years of Paramount's founding. The film runs about 20 minutes and features many personalities then under contract to Famous Players–Lasky and Paramount.

== Overview ==
A Trip to Paramountown is a promotional vehicle intended to show film industry employees in their normal, everyday work settings. It was released in the wake of several scandals associated with the film industry, such as the manslaughter trial involving silent screen comedian Roscoe Arbuckle, the death of actress Olive Thomas, the murder of director William Desmond Taylor, and the drug-induced decline of Wallace Reid.

This film influenced later studio-related scripted film fare such as Paramount's own Hollywood (1923), Goldwyn's Souls for Sale (1923), and MGM's Show People (1928).

Paramount later released A Trip Through the Paramount Studio (1927) in response to MGM's MGM Studio Tour (1925).

A Trip to Paramountown was preserved by the Academy Film Archive in 2016.

== Cast ==
Studio personnel, primarily actors, appear as themselves in cameos.

- T. Roy Barnes
- Alice Brady
- Betty Compson
- Dorothy Dalton
- Bebe Daniels
- Marion Davies
- William C. deMille
- Cecil B. DeMille
- George Fawcett
- Julia Faye
- Elsie Ferguson
- Wanda Hawley
- Jack Holt
- Leatrice Joy
- Lila Lee
- Walter Long
- Bert Lytell
- May McAvoy
- Thomas Meighan
- George Melford
- Mary Miles Minter
- Tom Moore
- Conrad Nagel
- Nita Naldi
- Anna Q. Nilsson
- Wallace Reid
- Theodore Roberts
- Milton Sills
- Gloria Swanson
- Rudolph Valentino

== Availability ==
A Trip to Paramountown was released on Flicker Alley's 2007 DVD of several rare Rudolph Valentino films.

== See also ==
- The House That Shadows Built (1931 promotional film produced by Paramount)
