= Hollywood (1923 film) =

1923 film by James Cruze

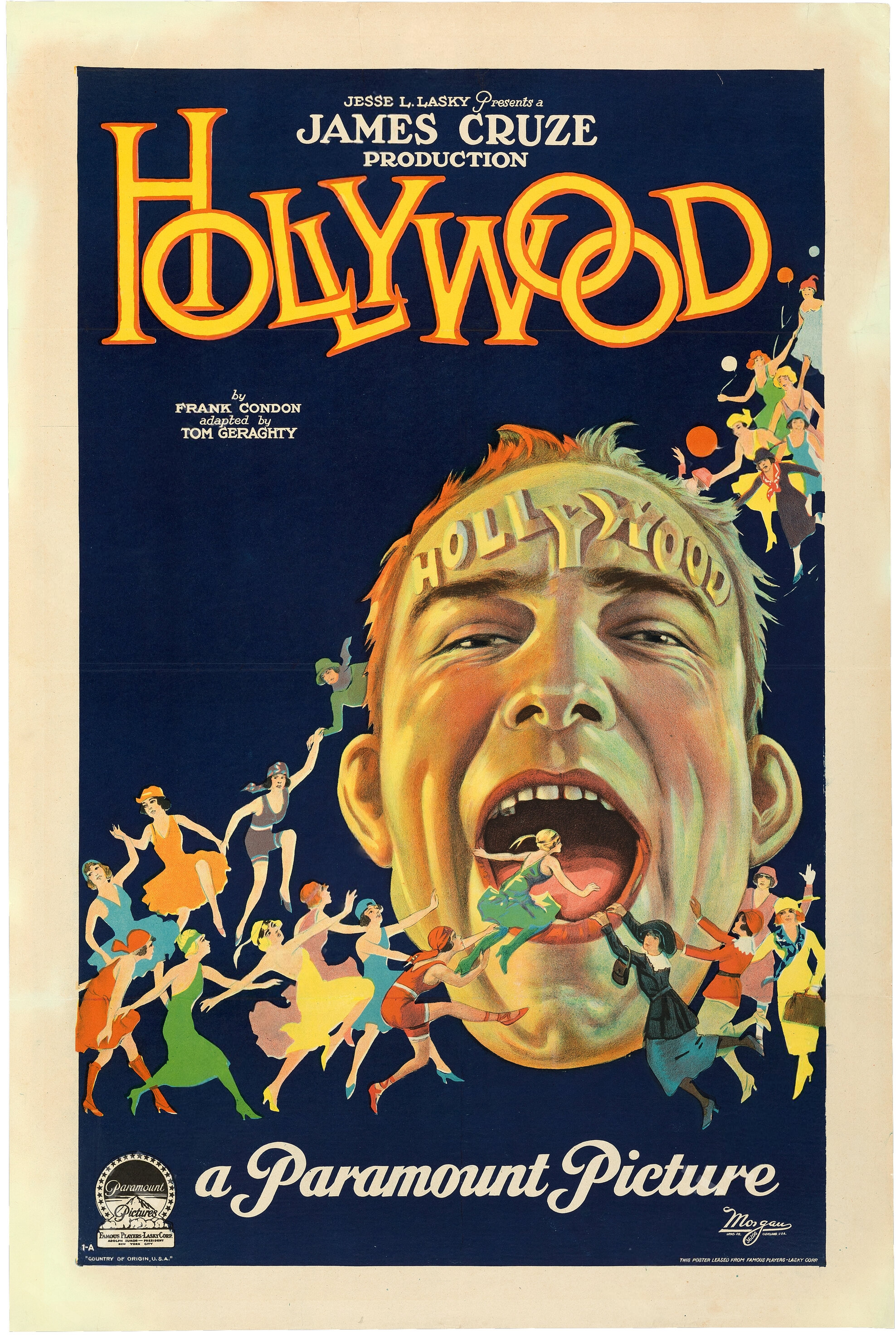
- Theatrical release poster
- Directed by: James Cruze
- Written by: Thomas J. Geraghty (scenario)
- Story by: Frank Condon
- Produced by: Adolph Zukor; Jesse L. Lasky
- Starring: Hope Drown; George K. Arthur; Ruby Lafayette; Harris Gordon; Bess Flowers; Luke Cosgrave; Eleanor Lawson
- Cinematography: Karl Brown
- Production company: Famous Players–Lasky
- Distributed by: Paramount Pictures
- Release date: August 19, 1923 (U.S.)
- Running time: 8 reels (8217 feet)
- Country: United States
- Language: Silent (English intertitles)

Hollywood is a 1923 American silent comedy film directed by James Cruze, adapted by Thomas J. Geraghty from a short story by Frank Condon, and released by Paramount Pictures. The film is a lengthier feature follow-up to Paramount's own short film exposé of itself, A Trip to Paramountown from 1922.

The film has become famous as having featured cameos of more than fifty famous Hollywood stars.

== Plot ==
Angela Whitaker is a young unknown who comes to Hollywood to become an actress, and brings her grandfather, Joel Whitaker. At the end of the first day, she has not found work, but her grandfather has found work.

== Cast ==
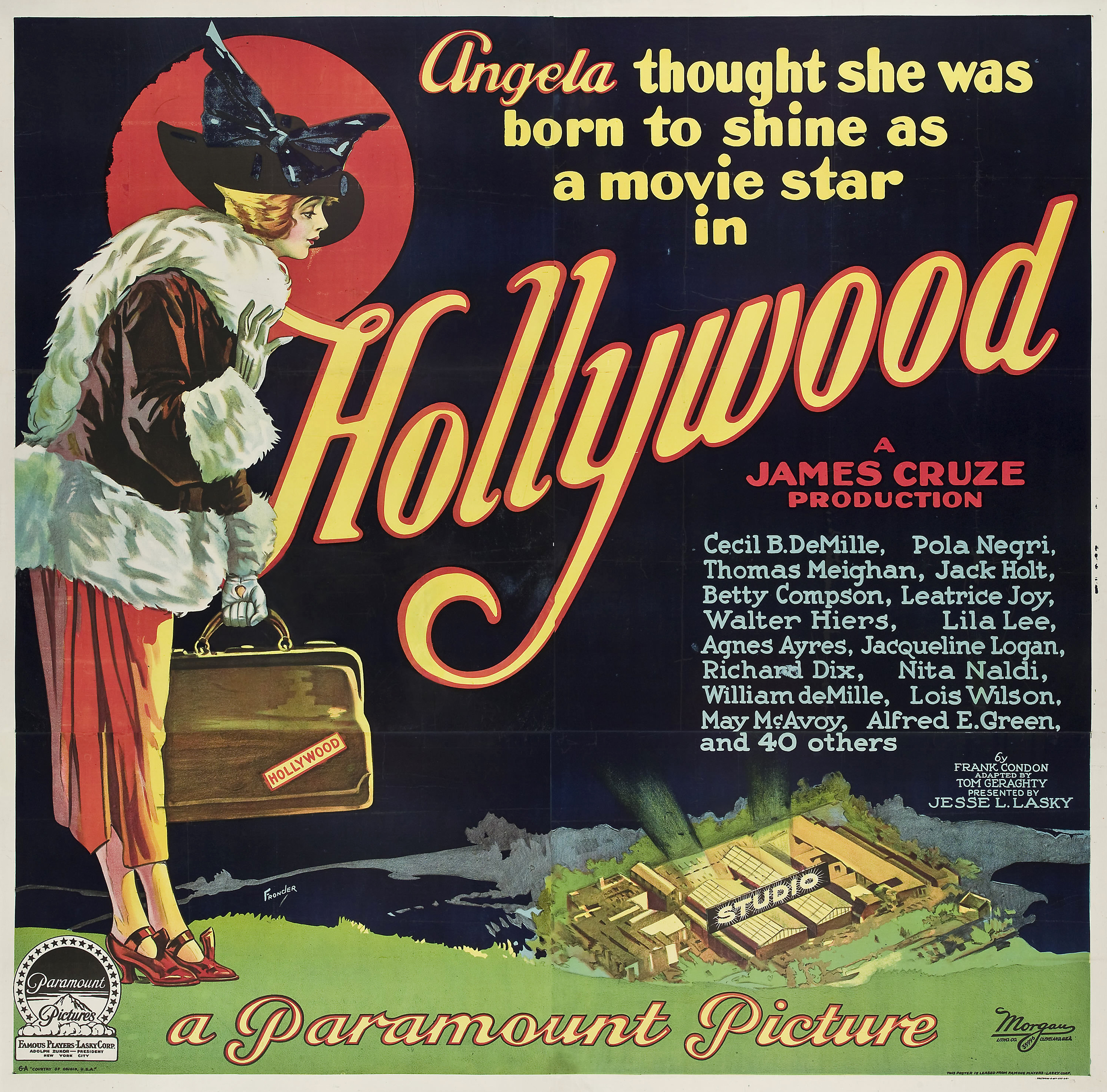
Six-sheet poster for Hollywood

- Hope Drown as Angela Whitaker
- Luke Cosgrave as Joel Whitaker
- George K. Arthur as Lem Lefferts
- Ruby Lafayette as Grandmother Whitaker
- Harris Gordon as Dr. Luke Morrison
- Bess Flowers as Hortense Towers
- Eleanor Lawson as Margaret Whitaker
- King Zany as Horace Pringle

=== Cameos ===
- Roscoe "Fatty" Arbuckle
- Gertrude Astor
- Mary Astor
- Agnes Ayres
- Baby Peggy
- Noah Beery
- William Boyd
- Charles Chaplin
- Edythe Chapman
- Betty Compson
- Ricardo Cortez
- Bebe Daniels
- Cecil B. DeMille
- William C. deMille
- Charles de Rochefort
- Richard Dix
- Douglas Fairbanks Sr.
- Dot Farley
- James Finlayson
- Sid Grauman
- Alan Hale Sr.
- Hope Hampton
- William S. Hart
- Jack Holt
- Leatrice Joy
- J. Warren Kerrigan
- Lila Lee
- Jacqueline Logan
- Jeanie Macpherson
- May McAvoy
- Robert McKim
- Thomas Meighan
- Bull Montana
- Owen Moore
- Nita Naldi
- Pola Negri
- Anna Q. Nilsson
- Charles Ogle
- Guy Oliver
- Jack Pickford
- Mary Pickford
- ZaSu Pitts
- Wallace Reid
- Charles Reisner
- Fritzi Ridgeway
- Dean Riesner
- Will Rogers
- Ford Sterling
- Anita Stewart
- Gloria Swanson
- Estelle Taylor
- Ben Turpin
- Bryant Washburn
- Laurence Wheat
- Lois Wilson

== Preservation ==
Hollywood is currently presumed lost. In February of 2021, the film was cited by the National Film Preservation Board on their Lost U.S. Silent Feature Films list.

== See also ==
- List of lost films
- Fascinating Youth
- Mary of the Movies
- Show People
- Souls for Sale
- A Trip to Paramountown
