= Wine of Youth =

1924 film directed by King Vidor

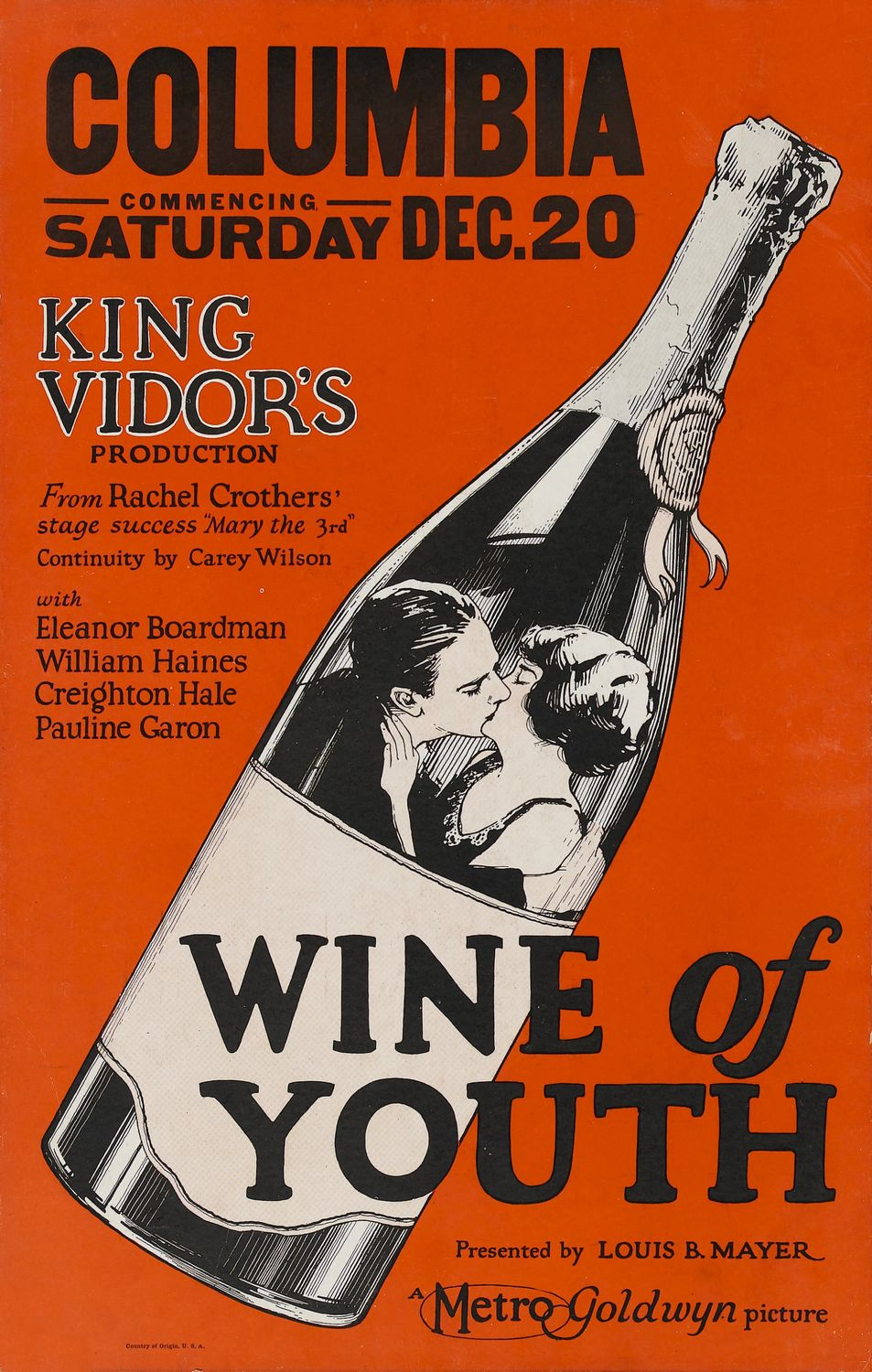
- Film poster
- Directed by: King Vidor
- Written by: Carey Wilson
- Based on: Mary the Third, a 1923 play by Rachel Crothers
- Produced by: King Vidor; Louis B. Mayer
- Starring: Eleanor Boardman; William Haines; Creighton Hale; Niles Welch
- Cinematography: John J. Mescall
- Distributed by: Metro-Goldwyn-Mayer
- Release date: September 15, 1924
- Running time: 72 minutes
- Country: United States
- Language: Silent (English intertitles)

Wine of Youth is a 1924 American silent comedy drama film directed by King Vidor, and released by Metro-Goldwyn-Mayer, shortly after the merger which created MGM in April 1924. Vidor did not consider it important enough to mention in his autobiography, although it did advance the careers of three young stars-to-be: Ben Lyon, Eleanor Boardman, and William Haines.

An early "flapper" romance set during the Jazz Age and made following the box-office popularity of Flaming Youth (1923), the film tests the limits of presenting unconventional social behavior among American youth and then ends with a paean to parental authority.

== Plot ==
The full film.

Mary (Eleanor Boardman) is a girl wooed by two suitors but made afraid of marriage by the quarreling of her parents. Eventually, she accepts Lynn (Ben Lyon), the more refined and poised of the two suitors.

== Cast ==
- Eleanor Boardman as Mary
- James W. Morrison as Clinton
- Johnnie Walker as William
- ZaSu Pitts as Lucy (scenes deleted)
- Niles Welch as Robert
- Creighton Hale as Richard
- Ben Lyon as Lynn
- William Haines as Hal
- William Collier, Jr. as Max
- Pauline Garon as Tish
- Eulalie Jensen as Mother
- E. J. Ratcliffe as Father
- Gertrude Claire as Granny
- Robert Agnew as Bobby
- Lucille Hutton as Anne
- Virginia Lee Corbin as Flapper
- Anne Sheridan as Flapper (as Gloria Heller)
- Sidney De Gray as Doctor (as Sidney De Grey)
- Jean Arthur as Automobile Reveler (uncredited)
- Aggie Herring as The Cook (uncredited)

== Production ==
Vidor's arrival at the newly amalgamated Metro-Goldwyn-Mayer would mark the beginning of a 20-year association with the studio. Wine of Youth is his first film appear under M-G-M.

== Theme ==
Wine of Youth is the first of four films that preceded Vidor's groundbreaking war epic The Big Parade (1925). In substance, these four "Jazz Age flaming youth pictures," of which three survive, bear little resemblance to the work to emerge in the late 1920s.

The film opens by contrasting the courtship rituals that characterized the mothers and grandmothers of the female "flappers" in the post-World War I period. The young women of the earlier Victorian Era swoon while reclining in their parent's parlor with their beaux and declare that "there's never been so great a love as ours." In contrast, the liberated flappers reject these conventions and organize a faux honeymoon with their boyfriends in the forest. They drink alcohol, smoke cigarettes, and cavort sexually, images very appealing to urban youth of that era. (Vidor described the movie as an "exploitation piece".)

Having defied conventionality and flirted with her virginity, the protagonist, Mary, discovers a new and genuine desire for her future husband that returns her to the fold: "There's never been so great a love as ours." Ostensibly an effort to present the virtues of a trial marriage - to discover "how a man is in everyday life before you give him your all" - Vidor contended that “there were so many restrictions and inhibitions that it really took the guts out of the idea.”

== Preservation ==
The film is preserved at George Eastman Museum, Rochester, New York. In February 2020, the film was shown at the 70th Berlin International Film Festival, as part of a retrospective dedicated to King Vidor's career.
