= True as Steel (film) =

1924 film by Rupert Hughes

True As Steel
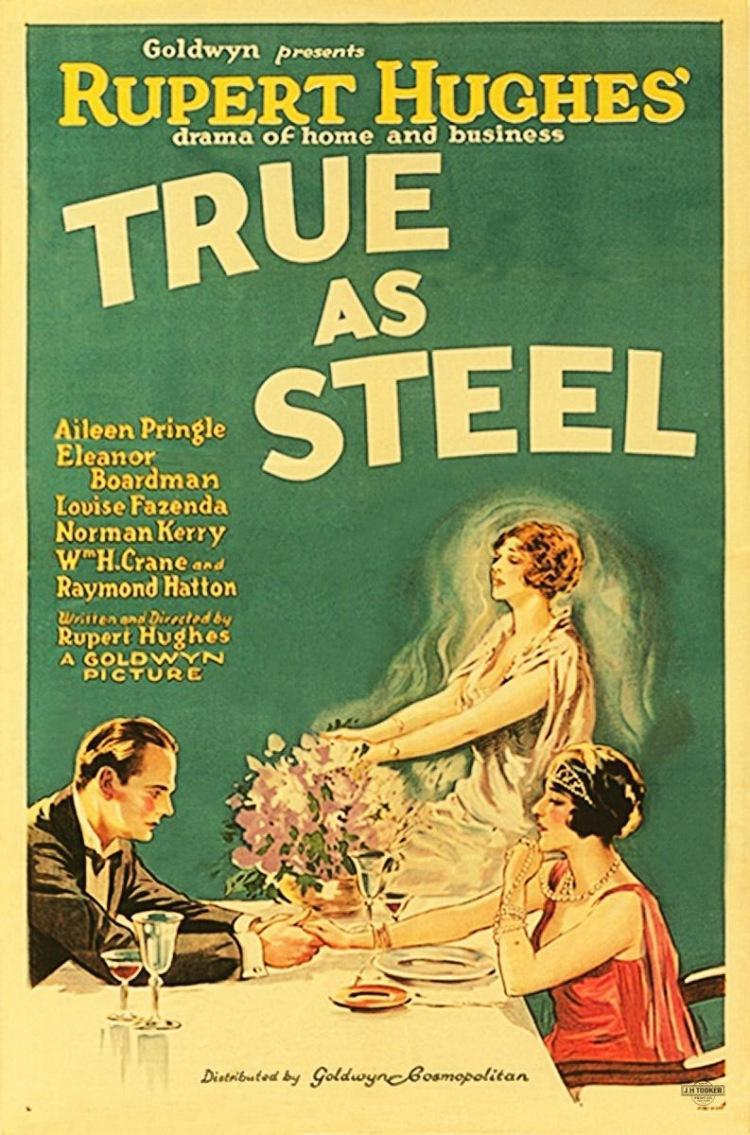
- Poster
- Directed by: Rupert Hughes
- Written by: Rupert Hughes
- Produced by: Goldwyn Pictures
- Starring: Aileen Pringle; Huntley Gordon
- Cinematography: John J. Mescall
- Distributed by: Goldwyn Pictures
- Release date: April 20, 1924
- Running time: 70 minutes
- Country: United States
- Language: Silent (English intertitles)

True As Steel is a 1924 American silent drama film directed and written by Rupert Hughes which stars Aileen Pringle and Huntley Gordon. The film is about a married businesswoman who has an affair with a married colleague.

== Plot ==
As described in a film magazine review, Frank Parry, a middle-aged, successful manufacturer, goes to New York City. There he becomes infatuated with Mrs. Eva Boutelle, a handsome businesswoman, whose husband Harry is out of town. He offers to secure a divorce if she will do likewise and then marry her. The temptation is strong for Mrs. Boutelle is fascinated by him. However, she remains true to her marriage vows, and the final meeting between the pair results in Eva resolving to remain "true as steel" to her spouse. Parry returns home, remorseful and determined to remain loyal to his faithful wife. He finds that his daughter Ethel has taken up a business career and intends to stick to it, despite her parents' disapproval.

== Cast ==
- Aileen Pringle as Mrs. Eva Boutelle
- Huntley Gordon as Frank Parry
- Cleo Madison as Mrs. Parry
- Eleanor Boardman as Ethel Parry
- Norman Kerry as Harry Boutelle
- William Haines as Gilbert Morse
- Louise Fazenda as Miss Leeds
- Louis Payne as Jake Leighton
- William H. Crane as Commodore Fairfield
- Raymond Hatton as Great Grandfather
- Lucien Littlefield as Mr. Foote

== Censorship ==
Before the film could be exhibited in Kansas, the Kansas Board of Review required extensive eliminations of dancing, kissing, and close-ups of bottles.

== Preservation ==
A fragment of True as Steel is preserved in the George Eastman Museum Motion Picture Collection.
