= The Midnight Express (film) =

1924 film by George W. Hill

- Film poster
- Directed by: George W. Hill
- Written by: George W. Hill
- Starring: Elaine Hammerstein; William Haines
- Production company: Columbia Pictures
- Distributed by: C.B.C. Film Sales
- Release date: June 1, 1924
- Running time: 56 minutes
- Country: United States
- Language: Silent (English intertitles)

The Midnight Express is a 1924 American silent action crime film directed by George W. Hill starring Elaine Hammerstein and William Haines.

== Plot ==
As described in a review in a film magazine, after a wild jazz party, railroad owner John Oakes (Nichols) disowns his son Jack (Haines) for being shiftless. Jack decides to rehabilitate himself and turns over a new leaf by quitting his palatial home and going to work in his father's railroad yard as a laborer in the roundhouse. Chasing an escaped convict, Silent Bill Brachely (Harmon), who had stolen his auto, leads Jack to the home of James Travers (Tilton), engineer of the big locomotive, the Midnight Express. There he meets and falls in love with the engineer's daughter, Mary (Hammerstein). The convict, who swears to get back at Jack, is sent back to jail. He escapes again and corners Jack in a lonely dispatch station on a mountainside. A terrific fight ensues and Jack wins. However, several freight cars have broken from the train and are speeding down a mountainous grade, heading toward the Midnight Express which is ascending the incline. Jack is able to derail the runaway freight cars just in time to save the Midnight Express. As a result, Jack gets back in his father's good graces and wins the affections of Mary.

== Cast ==
- Elaine Hammerstein as Mary Travers
- William Haines as Jack Oakes
- George Nichols as John Oakes
- Lloyd Whitlock as Joseph Davies
- Edwin B. Tilton as James Travers
- Pat Harmon as Silent Bill Brachely
- Bertram Grassby as Arthur Bleydon
- Phyllis Haver as Jessie Sybil
- Roscoe Karns as Switch Hogan
- Jack Richardson as Detective Collins
- Noble Johnson as Deputy Sheriff
- Dan Crimmins as Railroad Operator
- George Meadows as Railroad Operator

== Reception ==
Haines, then under contract to Metro-Goldwyn-Mayer, was loaned to Columbia Pictures, then a small studio, for five films, of which The Midnight Express was the first. The film received good reviews, making it Haines' breakout role. He received another boost when later in 1924, during a Screenland interview, flamboyant actress Peggy Hopkins Joyce claimed that the best screen kiss she ever saw was between Haines and Hammerstein in The Midnight Express.

== Preservation ==
A print of The Midnight Express is in the film collection of Cineteca Italiana (Milan).
