= Blanche Robinson =

American musician

Blanche Robinson (Mrs. Martin Hennion Robinson, née Williams; 18 May 1883, near Liberty, Kansas – 19 August 1969, Los Angeles) was an American composer and well-known piano accompanist. During her prolific years as a composer, she lived in New York City. During her more active years as a piano accompanist, she lived in Los Angeles. In her published music, she was known as Mrs. M. Hennion Robinson or Mrs. M. Hennion-Robinson.

== Music career ==
Robinson became a pupil in composition of Frederick Stephenson in Los Angeles. Her The Woman at Home, a chorus for women's voices, was performed with much success by the Lyric Club. Among her better-known compositions are Songs of You, The Mystic Hour, Youth, Fairies, Butterflies, The Dawn of Dawns, and a chorus for men's voices, A Song for Heroes. She performed under the management of Mr. Behymer in concert work. She also performed with Ebell Club, the Friday Morning Club, the Gamut Club, and many leading artists who toured Los Angeles.

== Family ==
- Father: Oliver David Williams (1854 Kentucky – 1932, Venice, California)
- Mother: Joanna Williams, née Dickerson (25 Oct 1855 Crawfordsville, Indiana – Oct 1949, Venice, California)
  - Husband: Martin Hennion Robinson (18 January 1878 Missouri – 2 May 1964 Los Angeles) and Blanche Williams were married September 27, 1904, in Los Angeles, at the Central Methodist Episcopal Church, Los Angeles.

Robinson died August 19, 1969, in Los Angeles. Her ashes are stored at Woodlawn Memorial Cemetery, Santa Monica, next to those of her daughter Dorothy B. Robinson (1906 Los Angeles – 2004), also a pianist.

== Music club and sorority affiliations ==
Both Blanche Robinson and her daughter, Dorothy Robinson, were members of The Dominant Club, a Los Angeles charitable club of women musicians founded in 1906 that promotes women in classical music and chamber music. Blanche Robinson was a charter member and past president of The Dominant Club.

== Early education ==
At age nine, Robinson's family moved to Chicago; there, she began eight-years of study with William Charles Ernest Seeboeck (21 August 1859 Vienna, Austria – 1907 Chicago), a gifted pianist and composer who had been a student of Anton Rubinstein (1829–1894).

== Selected compositions ==
- "Love Was a Beggar," written for Mary McCormic, music by Robinson
- "Love's Trilogy," a song for four-part chorus of women's voices, words by E. Sterrett, music by Robinson, G. Schirmer (1925) OCLC 8421454
- "The Fairies," words & music by Robinson, G. Schirmer (1926) OCLC 8421496, 497213655
- "The Woman at Home," a chorus for women's voices
- "Songs of You"
- "The Mystic Hour"
- "Youth," music by Robinson, words by Mrs. Louise Stedman Bostick OCLC 8437280
- "Butterflies"
- "The Dawn of Dawns," music by Robinson, words by Ina Donna Coolbrith OCLC 8449871
- "The Chudder Weaver," for high or medium voice, music by Robinson, words by Frances Hull Topping (b. 1879), G. Schirmer (©July 3, 1937) OCLC 499059208
- "Two pictures," for voice and piano, G. Schirmer (©1924) LCCN unk84197289 OCLC 498637345
- "The Lover's Errand"

Ellis Club of Los Angeles Collection of Musical Arrangements and Papers

Processed by the staff of the Dept. of Music Special Collections, UCLA
UCLA Library, Performing Arts Special Collections Online Archive of California

- "Baffled," in C minor, music by Robinson (TTBB - voice parts only); words by Helen Combes (mimeograph, n.d.) (©May 31, 1932), Harms, Inc. OCLC 809039155
- "Marmela," music by Robinson (TTBB, voice parts only); words by Mabel W. Phillips (mimeograph, n.d.)
- "A Song for Heroes," music by Robinson (TTBB), words by Edwin Markham (mimeograph, n.d.)
- "King Robert of Sicily," music by Robinson (SATB with narration; chorus parts only); words by Henry Wadsworth Longfellow (mimeograph, n.d.)
- "Liebestraum," by Franz Liszt, arrangement (TTBB) and words by Robinson (mimeograph, n.d.)

== Discography ==
1. Songs and Choral Music, (LP) (©1959)
  Frederick Davis, conductor
  Women's Lyric Club of Los Angeles
  M. Hennion Robinson, piano
  Works by Handel, Schubert, Musorgsky, Britten and Zador
2. 50th Anniversary Concert
  (LP) (1954)
  OCLC 55857256
  The Woman's Lyric Club
  Mrs. M. Hennion Robinson, piano
  Heimo Haitto, violin
  Benjamin Edwards, conductor
  1. "Music Spread thy Voice Around," George Frideric Handel
  2. "Come Unto These Yellow Sands," Henry Purcell
  3. "Do Not Go My Love," Richard Hageman (Enid Jacobsen, contralto)
  4. "Spring Morning in the Hills," Elinor Remick Warren
  5. "The Lover's Errand," Mrs. M. Hennion Robinson
  6. "The Snow," Edward Elgar
  7. "Hymn to the Waters," Gustav Holst
  8. "Le Papillon," Felix Fourdrain (Merlyn Pearce, soprano)
  9. "Where Silence Speaks," Benjamin Edwards
  10. "Le Nil," Xavier Leroux
  11. "Spanish Gypsy Girl," Eduard Lassen
