= Exchange of Wives =

1925 film

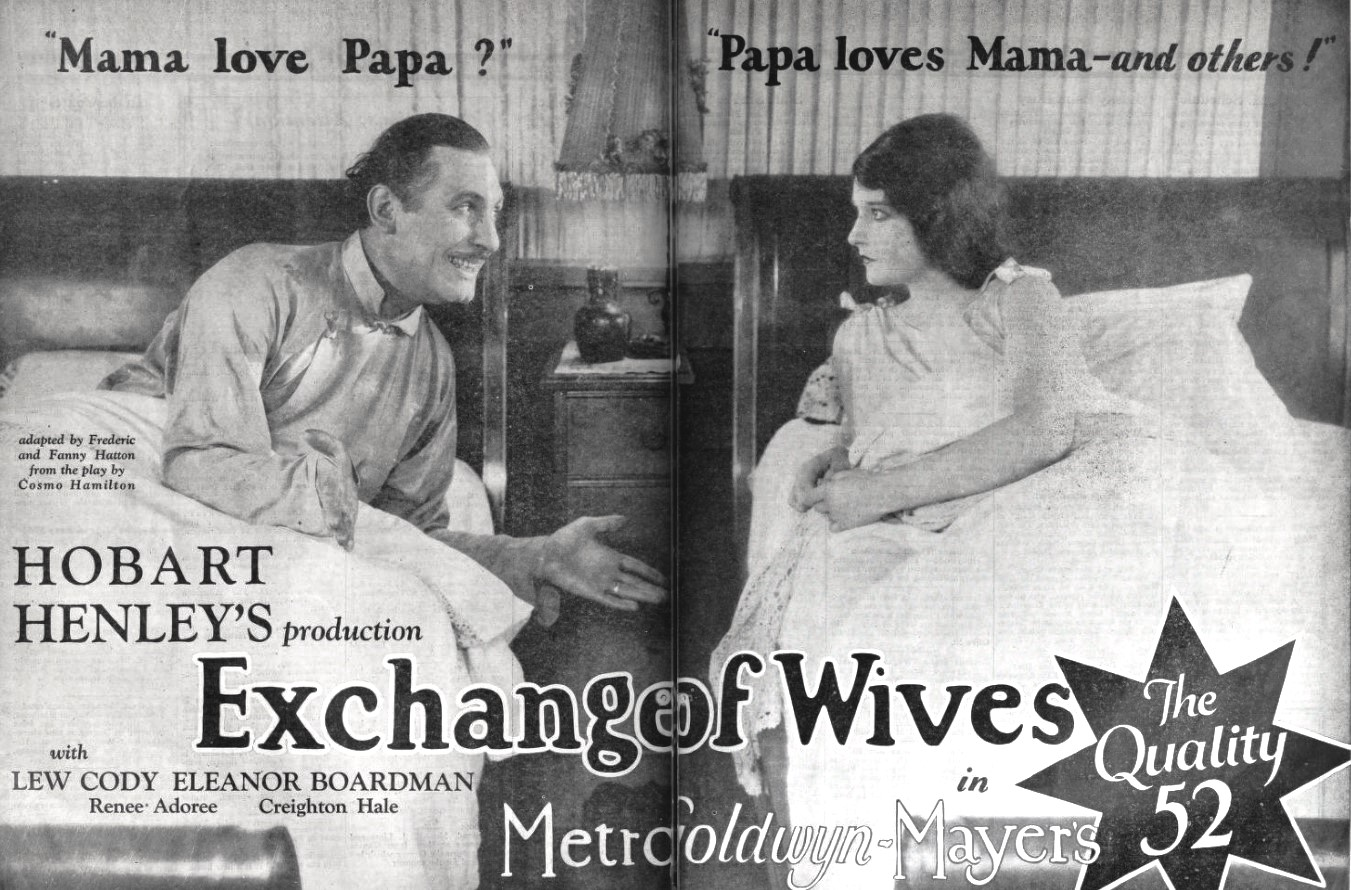
- Advertisement
- Directed by: Hobart Henley
- Written by: Fanny Hatton
- Based on: Exchange of Wives by Cosmo Hamilton
- Starring: Eleanor Boardman; Renée Adorée; Lew Cody; Creighton Hale
- Cinematography: Ben F. Reynolds
- Distributed by: Metro-Goldwyn-Mayer
- Release date: October 4, 1925
- Running time: 7 reels
- Country: United States
- Language: Silent (English intertitles)

Exchange of Wives is a 1925 American comedy drama film directed by Hobart Henley, with screenplay by Fanny Hatton based upon a Broadway play by Cosmo Hamilton. The film stars Eleanor Boardman, Renée Adorée, Lew Cody, and Creighton Hale.

== Plot ==
As described in a film magazine review, a serious young man and his emotional wife become acquainted with a frivolous young man and his serious minded wife, and it is not long before like attracts like, to the discomfiture of all. The four agree to an exchange of wives during a trip into the mountains, with the result that each is soon glad to go back to the original marital arrangement.

== Cast ==
- Eleanor Boardman as Margaret Rathburn
- Lew Cody as John Rathburn
- Renée Adorée as Elise Moran
- Creighton Hale as Victor Moran
- Pierre de Ramey
- June Rock as Little Girl (uncredited)

== Preservation ==
Prints of Exchange of Wives are held at Archives Du Film Du CNC (Bois d'Arcy) and by MGM.
