= Jimmie Shields =

American interior designer (1905–1974)

- Born: James Shields Fickeisen; 24 May 1905; Pittsburgh, Pennsylvania, United States
- Died: 6 March 1974 (aged 68); Los Angeles, California, United States
- Occupations: Actor; Interior Designer
- Years active: 1926–1974
- Partner: William Haines (1926–1973)

Jimmie Shields (born James Shields Fickeisen; May 24, 1905 – March 6, 1974) was an American interior designer and film actor, best known as the longtime partner of silent film star William "Billy" Haines. Their relationship, which lasted nearly 50 years, is frequently cited by historians as the first "openly gay" relationship in Hollywood history.

== Early life ==
Shields was born in Pittsburgh, Pennsylvania, to Irwin Fickeisen and Ida Belle Shields. Following his parents' divorce, he adopted his mother's maiden name as his surname. He was the older child between an middle younger sister, Virginia "Jenny" Fickeisen Conrad, and a younger brother, Joseph Sherwin Haselden. He served in the U.S. Navy from April 1924 until October 1925, when he received an honorable discharge after contracting meningitis.

== Relationship with William Haines ==
Shields met Haines in New York City in early 1926. Haines, then a rising star at MGM, convinced Shields to move to Los Angeles, where he helped him find work as a film extra and stand-in at MGM.

In 1933, studio head Louis B. Mayer reportedly gave Haines an ultimatum: enter a "lavender marriage" to conceal his sexuality or lose his career. Haines chose to stay with Shields, effectively ending his time as a leading man in Hollywood. The couple remained together for 47 years, earning the nickname "the happiest married couple in Hollywood" from their close friend Joan Crawford.

== Interior design career ==
After leaving the film industry, the pair founded William Haines Designs, a premier interior decorating firm. While Haines was the public face, Shields was a vital partner in the business. Their Hollywood Regency style became highly influential, with a client list that included Joan Crawford, Gloria Swanson, Carole Lombard, and Frank Sinatra also political figures including Ronald Reagan and Nancy Reagan during Reagan's tenure as Governor of California.

They decorated the Winfield House, the U.S. Ambassador's residence in London.

== Personal life ==
In 1936, the couple survived a violent attack at their beach home in Manhattan Beach by a mob, reportedly members of the Ku Klux Klan, after a neighbor made unfounded accusations against Shields.

== Death ==
William Haines died of lung cancer on December 26, 1973. Shields, who was reportedly struggling with the onset of Alzheimer's disease and profound grief, took his own life on March 6, 1974, by an overdose of sleeping pills. His suicide note stated, "I now find it impossible to go it alone, I am much too lonely". He was interred next to Haines at Woodlawn Memorial Cemetery in Santa Monica.

== Cited sources ==
- Adrich, Robert; Wotherspoon, Garry (2002). Who's Who in Gay and Lesbian History: From Antiquity to World War II (2nd ed.). Psychology Press. ISBN 0-415-15983-0.
- Dennis, Jan (2003). Manhattan Beach Police Department. Arcadia Publishing. ISBN 0-738-52089-6.
- Golden, Eve (2001). Golden Images: 41 Essays on Silent Film Stars. McFarland. ISBN 0-786-40834-0.
- Mann, William J. (1998). Wisecracker: The Life and Times of William Haines, Hollywood's First Openly Gay Star. New York, NY: Viking. ISBN 978-0670871551. OCLC 243900007.
- Prono, Luca (2008). Encyclopedia of Gay and Lesbian Popular Culture. ABC-CLIO. ISBN 978-0-313-33599-0.
- Stern, Keith (2009). Queers in History: The Comprehensive Encyclopedia of Historical Gays, Lesbians and Bisexuals. BenBella Books. ISBN 978-1-935-25183-5.
