= The Tiger's Claw =

1923 film by Joseph Henabery

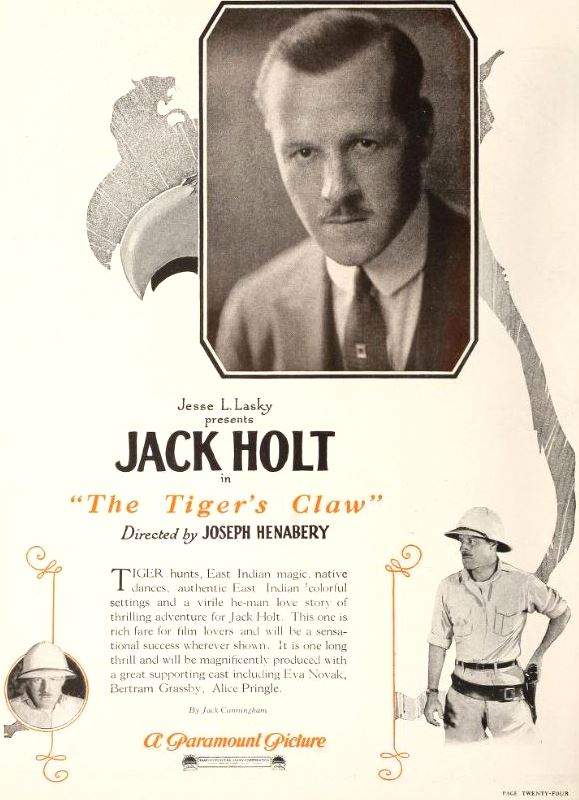
- Trade advertisement
- Directed by: Joseph Henabery
- Screenplay by: Jack Cunningham
- Starring: Jack Holt; Eva Novak; George Periolat; Bertram Grassby; Aileen Pringle; Carl Stockdale
- Cinematography: Faxon M. Dean
- Production company: Famous Players–Lasky Corporation
- Distributed by: Paramount Pictures
- Release date: March 18, 1923
- Running time: 60 minutes
- Country: United States
- Language: Silent (English intertitles)

The Tiger's Claw is a lost 1923 American silent drama film directed by Joseph Henabery and written by Jack Cunningham. The film stars Jack Holt, Eva Novak, George Periolat, Bertram Grassby, Aileen Pringle, and Carl Stockdale. It was released on March 18, 1923, by Paramount Pictures.

== Cast ==
- Jack Holt as Sam Sandell
- Eva Novak as Harriet Halehurst
- George Periolat as Henry Frazer Halehurst
- Bertram Grassby as Raj Singh
- Aileen Pringle as Chameli Brentwood
- Carl Stockdale as Sathoo Ram
- Frank Butler as Inspector George Malvin
- George Field as Prince
- Evelyn Selbie as Azun
- Frederick Vroom as Colonel Byng
- Lucien Littlefield as Goyrem
- Robert Cain as Sothern
- Robert Dudley as Army Officer

== Preservation ==
No copies of The Tiger's Claw are listed as being in any film archive, making it a lost film.
