= Subway Express =

1931 film

- Directed by: Fred C. Newmeyer
- Written by: Earle Snell
- Starring: Jack Holt; Aileen Pringle; Fred Kelsey
- Cinematography: Joseph Walker
- Edited by: Arthur Huffsmith
- Production company: Columbia Pictures
- Distributed by: Columbia Pictures
- Release date: May 1, 1931
- Running time: 72 minutes
- Country: United States
- Language: English

Subway Express is a 1931 American pre-Code mystery film directed by Fred C. Newmeyer and starring Jack Holt, Aileen Pringle and Fred Kelsey.

== Cast ==
- Jack Holt as Inspector Killian
- Aileen Pringle as Dale Tracy
- Fred Kelsey as Detective Kearney
- Alan Roscoe as Edward Tracy
- Jason Robards Sr. as Paul Bordon
- Sidney Bracey as Herman Stevens
- Selmer Jackson as Mason
- William Humphrey as Mr. Cotton
- Ethel Wales as Mrs. Cotton
- Max Asher as Mr. Blotnick
- Bertha Blackman as Mrs. Blotnick
- Lillian Leighton as Mrs. Mary Mullins
- James Goss as Mulvaney
- Mason Williams as Prizefighter
- Bert Linden as Sheck
- Robert St. Angelo as Zippe
- John Kelly as Motorman
- Dorothy Bay as Miss Smith
- Bob Kortman as Guard
- Sally St. Clair as Flapper
- Mary Gordon as Mrs. Delaney
- Earl Seid as Sydney
- Ginger Connolly as Thomas

== Bibliography ==
- Goble, Alan. The Complete Index to Literary Sources in Film. Walter de Gruyter, 1999.
