= Honorary Marine =

Title in the United States Marine Corps

Honorary Marine is a title that has been given to various people by the United States Marine Corps.

== Current official program (1992–present) ==
The distinction is currently bestowed solely by the Commandant of the United States Marine Corps to "individuals in the civilian community who have made extraordinary contributions to the Marine Corps." It "carries no entitlement to pay or benefits."

Nominations may be submitted to the commandant by "commanding generals, commanding officers, and officers-in-charge" and "must be endorsed by a general officer within their chain of command." Criteria include:

(a) A terminally ill child that has some unique or qualifying link to the military or the Marine Corps.
(b) An individual who has given extraordinary service or support to the Marine Corps, and for whom any lesser form of recognition would be insufficient.
(c) Deceased individuals whose actions or contributions on behalf of the Marine Corps would have merited consideration before their death.

=== Honorees ===
Two somewhat differing lists can be viewed on the official Marine Corps website, one at the Marine Corps Honorary Marine page (1992-2011), and the other in this document (1992–2007).

Among the notables on both lists are:

- Joe Rosenthal (1996), the reporter who took the iconic photograph Raising the Flag on Iwo Jima
- Felix de Weldon (2001), the sculptor of the Marine Corps War Memorial, based on Rosenthal's photograph
- Combat veterans and United States Senators Max Cleland and Daniel Inouye (both 2001)
- Jim Nabors (2001), star of the television comedy show Gomer Pyle, U.S.M.C., "promoted" to lance corporal on August 9, 2001, later to corporal on September 25, 2007
- Actor Chuck Norris (2006)
- Actor Gary Sinise (2012)
- Member of Congress Ike Skelton (2010), former Chairman of the House Armed Services Committee
- John Williams, composer (2023)

Among the 2012 honorees were Cody Green, a terminally ill boy who loved the U.S. Marine Corps, and Ryan Crocker, U.S. Ambassador to Afghanistan.

Jacob Tyler Sprinkle was posthumously made an Honorary Marine on July 11, 2014 and the family was presented his honor on October 15, 2014. The ceremony was held at Lee High School in Jonesville, Virginia. The presenting officer of the United States Marine Corps was Lt. General John A. Toolan, Jr., Commander, Marine Corps Forces, Pacific. Jacob lost a 13-year fight with congenital heart defects.

As of October 2014, there have been fewer than 100 Honorary Marine titles presented in the 239 years of the Marine Corps.

== Other ad hoc honorees ==
Lon Chaney, Sr. was made an honorary member of the Corps for his portrayal of a Marine sergeant in the 1926 film Tell It to the Marines. Cartoon character Bugs Bunny was given the rank of honorary Marine master sergeant for his performance in Super-Rabbit. Actor and comedian Bob Hope, famous for his work with the USO, was named an honorary brigadier general of the Corps.
