= Woodlawn Memorial Cemetery (Santa Monica, California) =

Cemetery in Santa Monica, California

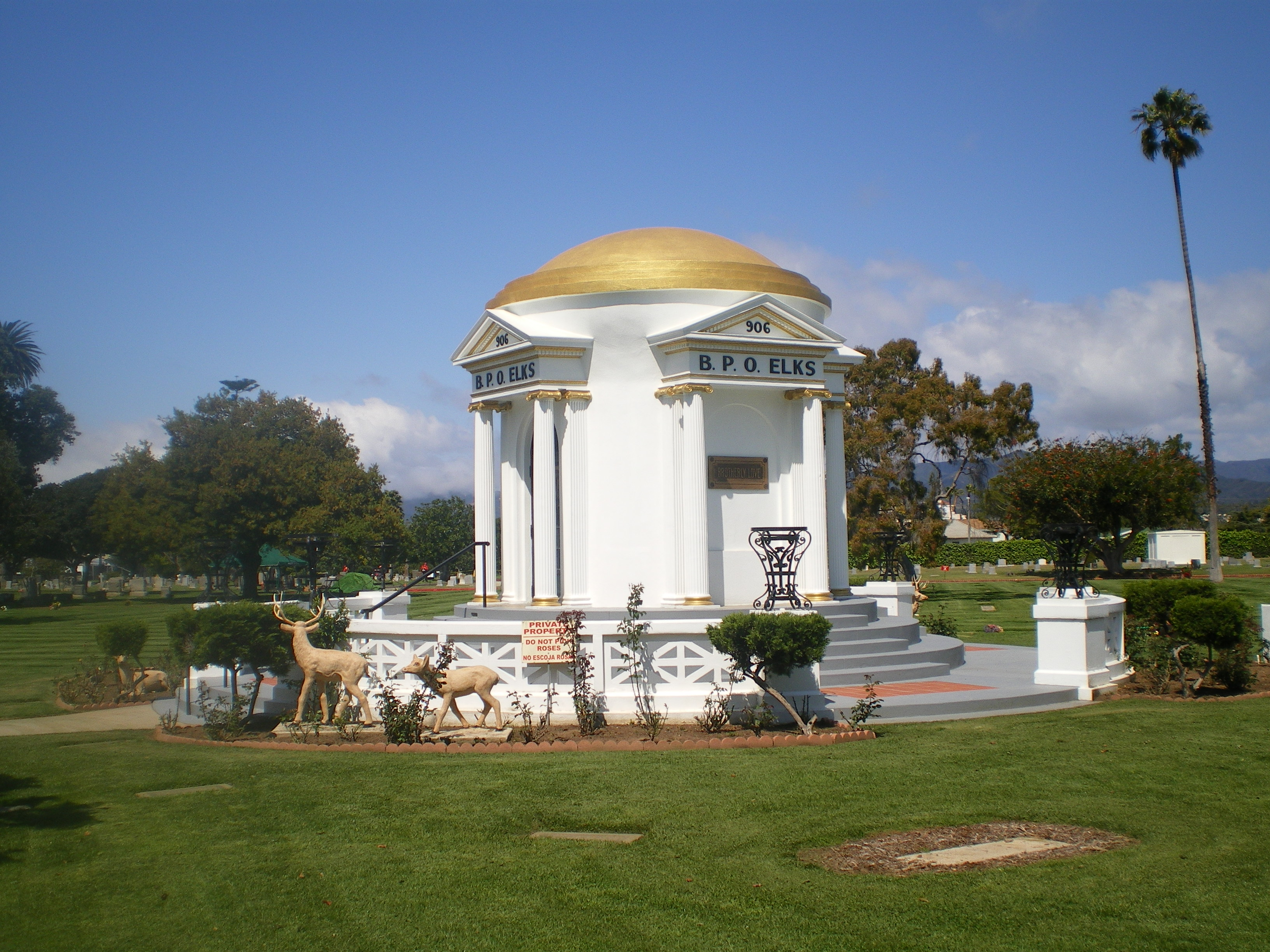
- Elks Pavilion
- Interactive map of Woodlawn Memorial Cemetery

Details
- Location: Santa Monica, California
- Country: United States
- Coordinates: 34°01′03″N 118°28′30″W

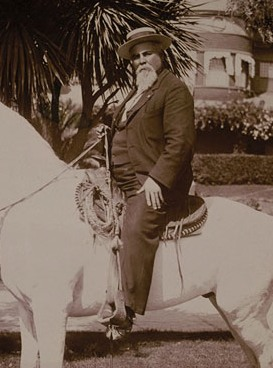
Woodlawn Cemetery was founded and deeded to the city by Mayor Juan José Carrillo in 1884.

Woodlawn Cemetery, Mausoleum & Mortuary, formerly Ballona Cemetery, is located at 1847 14th Street, alongside Pico Boulevard in Santa Monica, California, United States. The cemetery was founded in 1897 and sits on 26 acres (11 ha). It is owned and operated by the city of Santa Monica and is the final resting place of more than 54,000 people. The cemetery has an eco-friendly section.

== History ==
Founded in 1897, the cemetery was first named the Ballona Township Cemetery as it was located on the Rancho La Ballona. In the 1980s, it began to be used as a filming location. The cemetery was heavily damaged in the 1994 Northridge earthquake.

== Notable burials ==
- Roger Allers (1949–2026), animator and film director
- Hugo Ballin (1879–1956), artist
- Mabel Ballin (1887–1958), actress
- George Bancroft (1882–1956), actor
- Jay Belasco (1888–1949), actor
- Ted Bessell (1935–1996), actor
- Charles Bickford (1891–1967), actor
- Barbara Billingsley (1915–2010), actress
- William Bishop (1918–1959), actor
- Bonnie Bonnell (1905–1964), actress
- Edwina Booth (1904–1991), actress
- Edward Brophy (1895–1960), actor
- Leo Carrillo (1880–1961), actor and conservationist
- James Crabe (1931–1989), cinematographer
- Henry Cuesta (1931–2003), musician
- Faye Dancer (1925–2002), professional baseball player
- Henry Daniell (1894–1963), actor
- Weston and Winston Doty (1913–1934), acting twins, drowned in a flood
- Cathy Downs (1924–1976), actress
- Vernon Duke (1893–1969), songwriter (later moved)
- Lion Feuchtwanger (1884–1958), author
- Paul Fix (1901–1983), actor
- Glenn Ford (1916–2006), actor
- Leland Ford (1893–1965), congressman
- Nicolás "Nick" Rolando Gabaldón Jr. (1927–1951), surfer
- Ilka Grüning (1876–1964), actress
- William Haines (1900–1973), actor, interior designer
- Tom Hayden (1939–2016), Senator, activist, author, conservationist
- Paul Henreid (1908–1992), actor, director
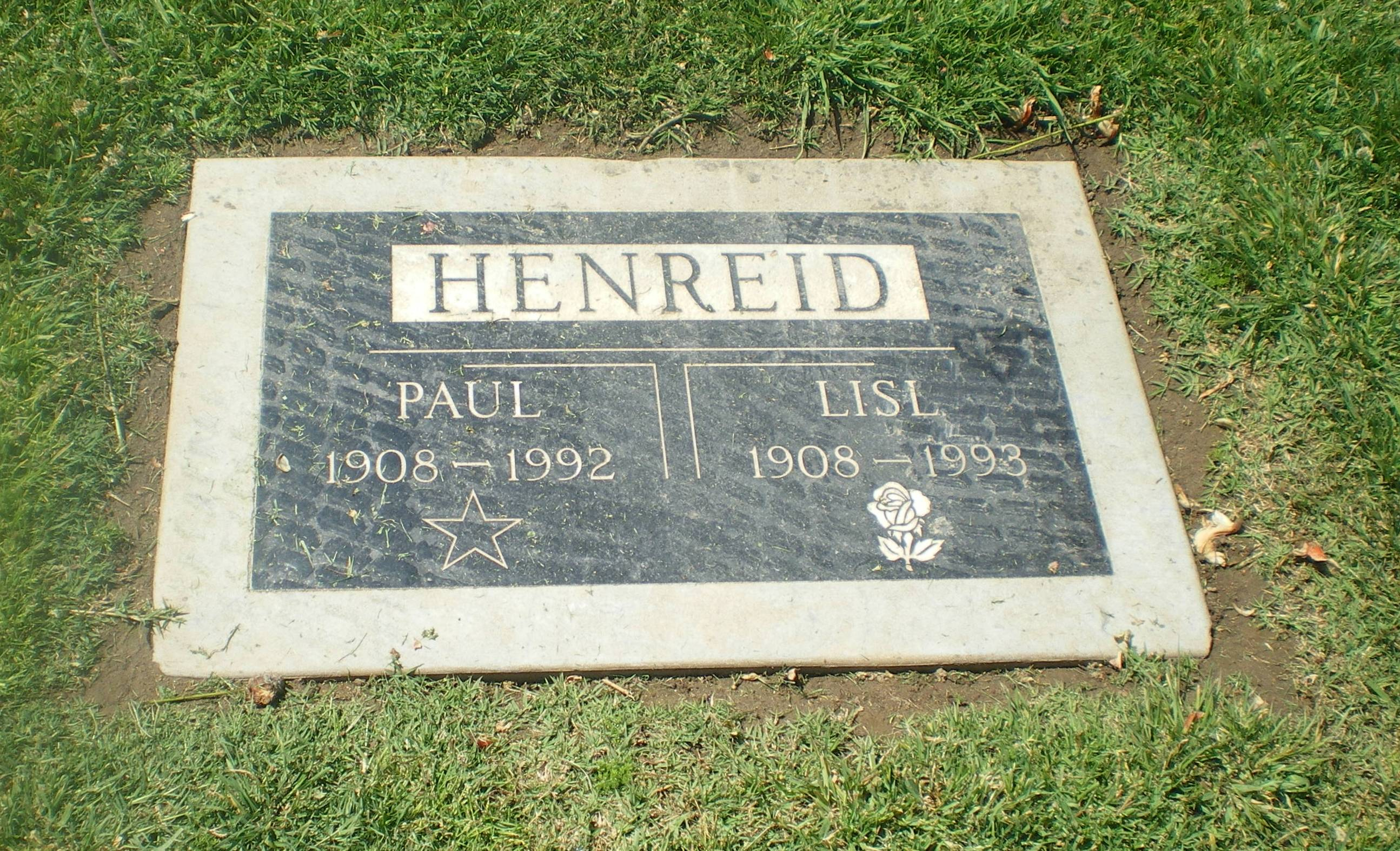
  Paul Henreid Grave
- Phil Hill (1927–2008), race car driver
- Evelyn Hooker (1907–1996), psychologist
- Olaf Hytten (1888–1955), actor
- Abbot Kinney (1850–1920), real estate baron
- Harvey Korman (1927–2008), actor and comedian
- Henry Kuttner (1915–1958), author
- Florence Lake (1904–1980), actress
- Audra Lindley (1918–1997), actress

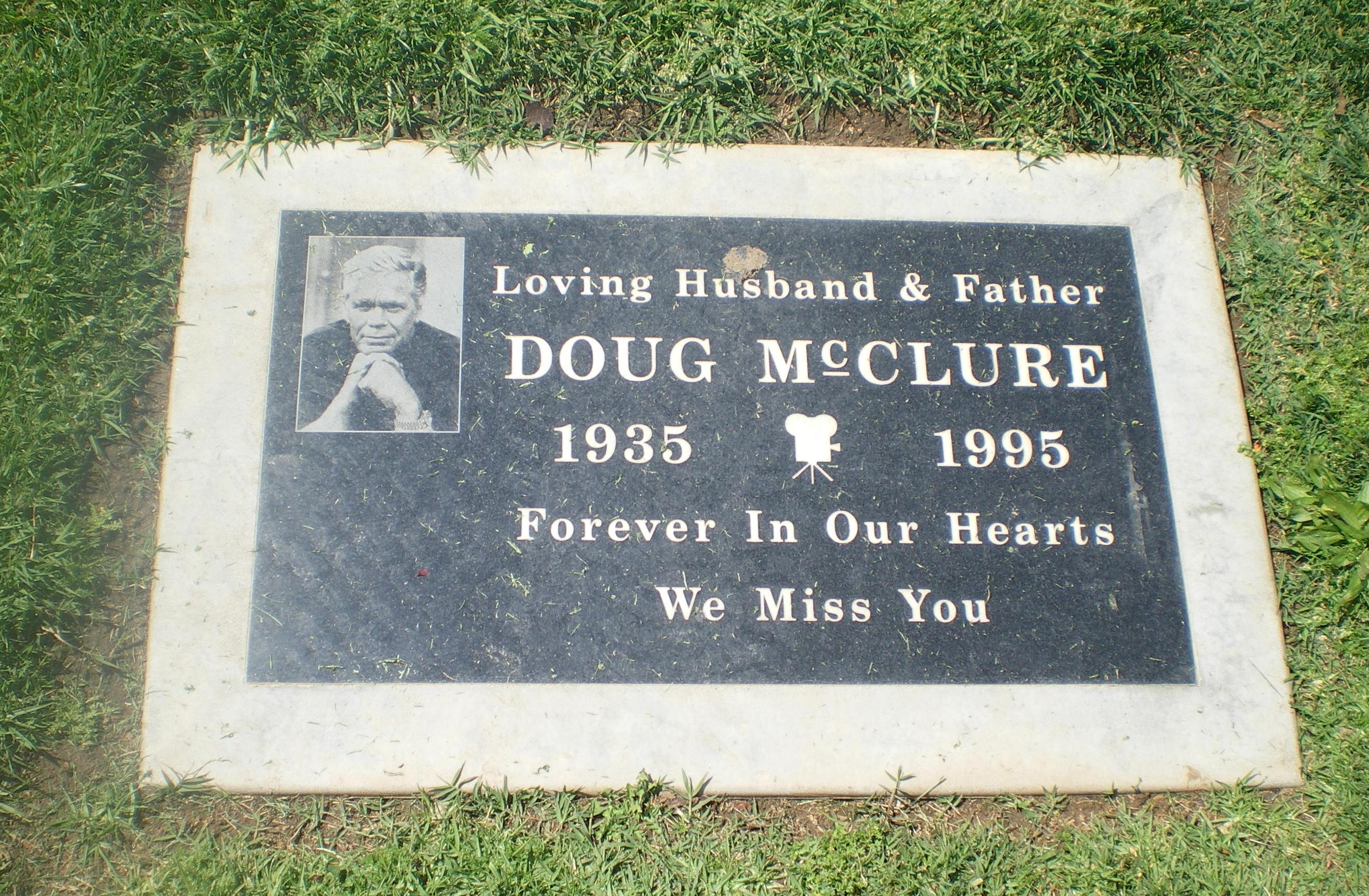
Doug McClure Grave

- Hughie Mack (1884–1927), actor
- Doug McClure (1935–1995), actor
- Bess Myerson (1924–2014), actress, Miss America, political activist
- Red Norvo (1908–1999), jazz musician
- Lynne Overman (1887–1943), actor
- Christabel Pankhurst (1880–1958), British suffragette
- Jimmy Phipps (1950–1969), Vietnam Medal of Honor recipient
- James Poe (1921–1980), screenwriter
- Janos Prohaska (1919–1974), actor, stuntman
- Bill Raisch (1905–1984), actor
- Sally Ride (1951–2012), first female American to space, physicist.
- Blanche Robinson (1883–1969), pianist and composer
- Irene Ryan (1902–1973), actress and comedian
- Mitchell Ryan (1934–2022), actor
- Hayes "Big Ed" Sanders (1930–1954), Olympic boxing champion
- E. C. Segar (1894–1938), cartoonist, creator of "Popeye"
- Jimmie Shields (1905–1974), interior designer
- Hal Smith (1916–1994), actor who played Otis Campbell on The Andy Griffith Show
- May Sutton (1886–1975), U.S. and Wimbledon tennis champion
- Sándor Szabó (1906–1966), wrestler
- William Tuttle (1912–2007), Hollywood make-up artist
- Jesse Unruh (1922–1987), politician and government official
