= Aileen Pringle =

American actress (1895–1989)

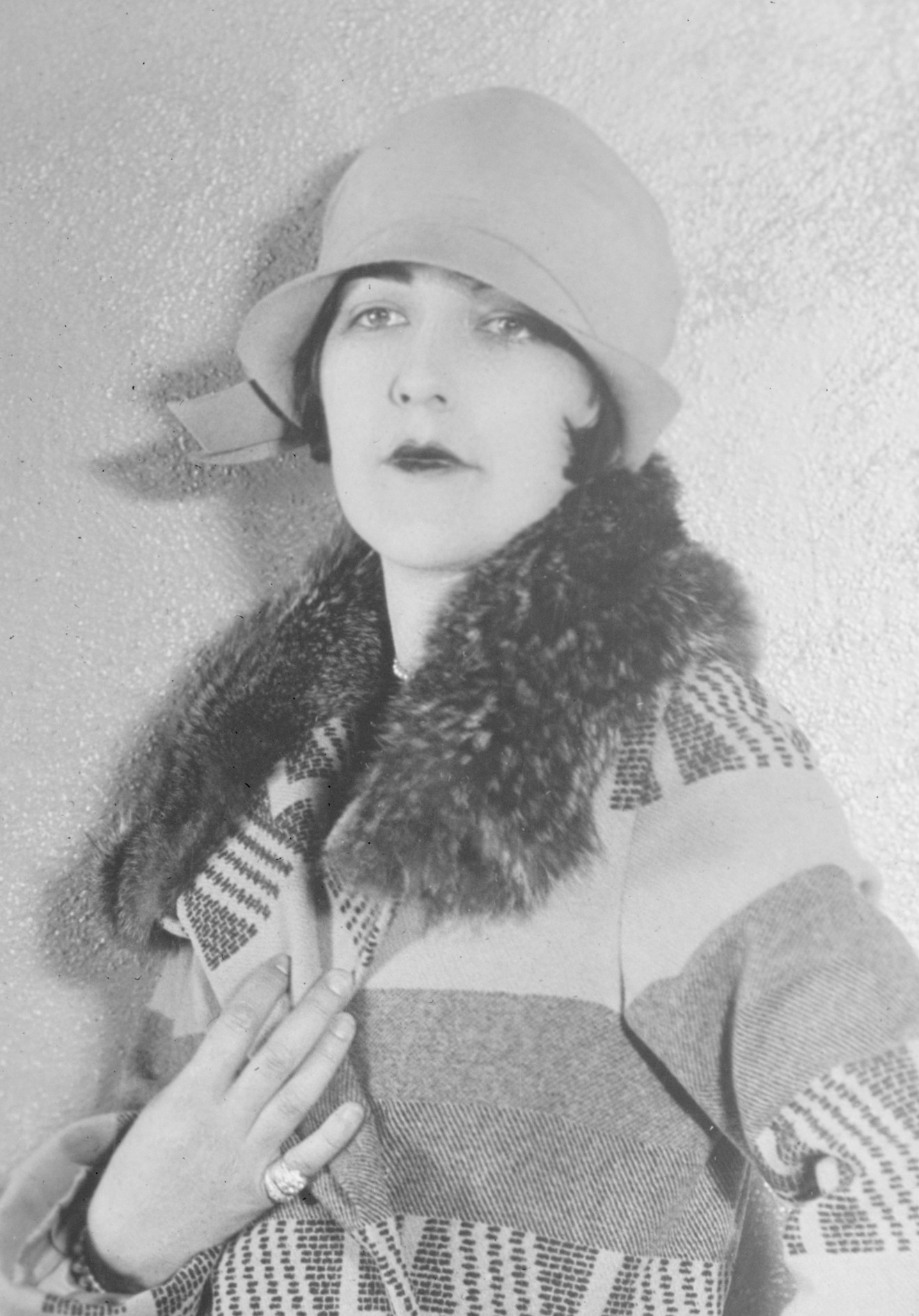
- Pringle in 1926
- Born: Aileen Bisbee; July 23, 1895; San Francisco, California, U.S.
- Died: December 16, 1989 (aged 94); New York, New York, U.S.
- Other name: Aileen Savage
- Occupation: Actress
- Years active: 1920–1944
- Spouse(s): Charles McKenzie Pringle (m. 1916; div. 1926) James M. Cain (m. 1944; div. 1946)

Aileen Pringle (born Aileen Bisbee; July 23, 1895 – December 16, 1989) was an American stage and film actress during the silent film era.

== Biography ==
=== Early life ===
Pringle was born into a prominent and wealthy San Francisco family and educated in Europe. She began her acting career shortly after her 1916 marriage to Charles McKenzie Pringle, the son of a wealthy titled British Jamaican landowner and a member of the Privy and Legislative Councils of Jamaica.

=== Career rise ===
Many of Pringle's early roles were only modestly successful, and she continued to build her career until the early 1920s. One of Pringle's first high-profile roles was in the Rudolph Valentino film Stolen Moments (1920). She was selected by friend and romance novelist Elinor Glyn to star in the 1924 film adaptation of her novel Three Weeks with matinee idol Conrad Nagel. The role catapulted Pringle into leading-lady status and her career began to build momentum.

=== Later career ===
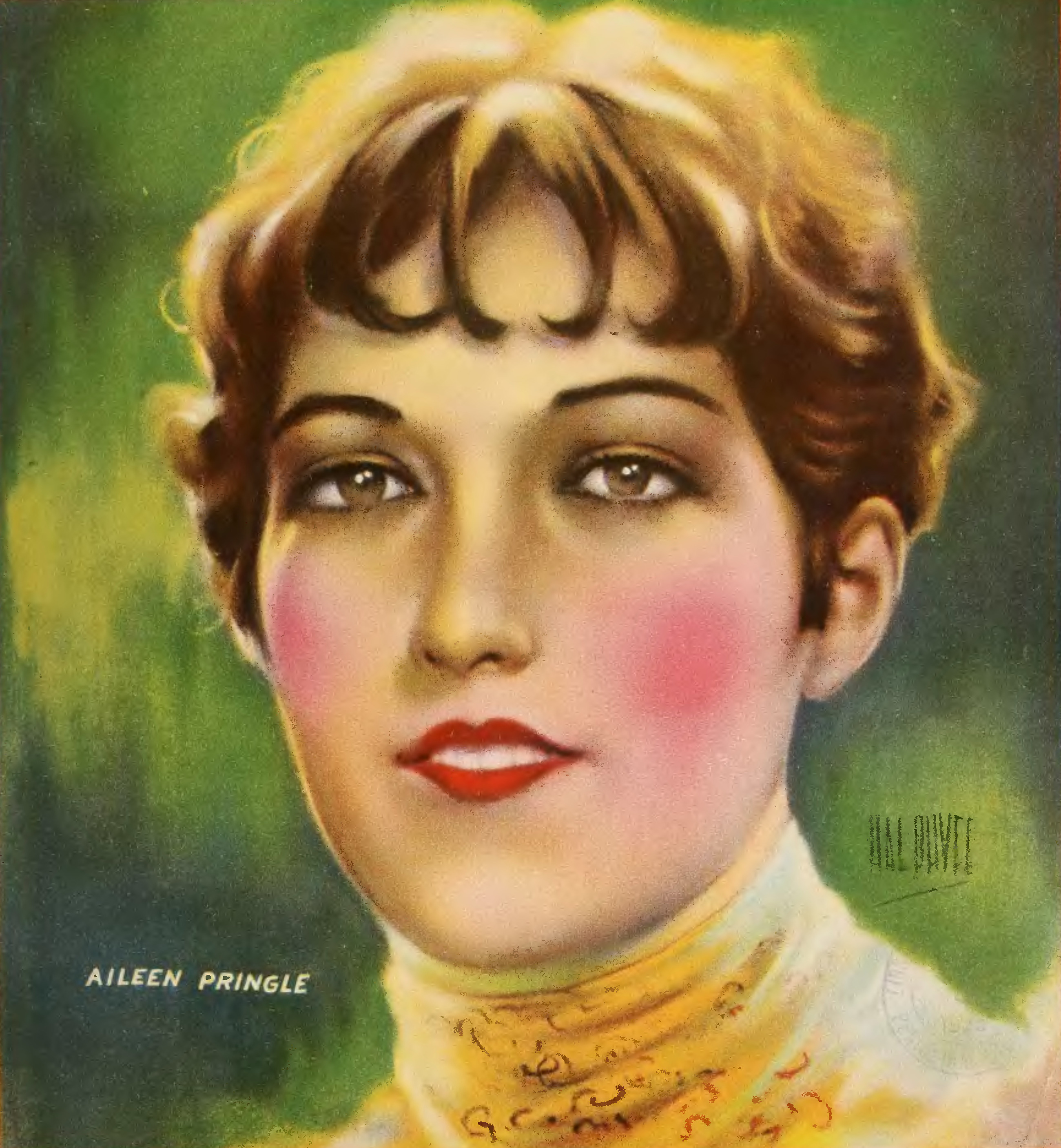
Aileen Pringle cover art from Picture-Play Magazine, 1926

Pringle's acting career continued throughout the early 1920s; however, she allegedly was disliked by many of her co-workers due to haughty and dismissive behavior. She was prone to make witty, sometimes caustic, comments on Hollywood and her fellow actors. During a romantic scene in Three Weeks, in which actor Conrad Nagel carried her in his arms to the bedroom, lip readers saw her say: "If you drop me, you bastard, I'll break your neck". Pringle's apparent disdain for her profession began to hurt her career and by the late 1920s her roles became fewer.

During the late silent and early period of talking pictures, Pringle co-starred in a series of light films with actor Lew Cody, including Adam and Evil (1927), Tea for Three (1927), Wickedness Preferred (1928), The Baby Cyclone (1928), Beau Broadway (1928), A Single Man (1929), and By Appointment Only (1933). Of Pringle's performance in Adam and Evil, Mourdant Hall in the August 9, 1927 edition of The New York Times wrote, “Evelyn Trevelyn, the Eve of this tale, is alluded to by Ralph Spence is (sic) one of the titles as a “spare rib.” She is impersonated by Aileen Pringle and therefore is an asset to the scenes.”

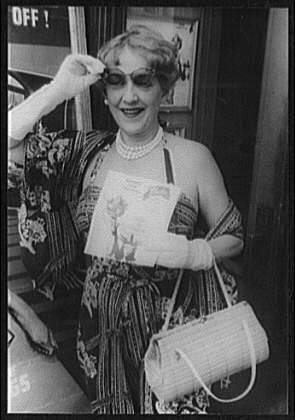
Pringle in 1952, photographed by Carl Van Vechten.

Although disliked by some Hollywood insiders, Aileen Pringle often was dubbed by the press as the "Darling of the Intelligentsia" because of her close friendship with such literary figures as Carl Van Vechten, Joseph Hergesheimer, Rupert Hughes, and H. L. Mencken who became a lifelong friend of the actress. She brokered the meeting of Mencken and Valentino, of which Mencken wrote an account, some weeks after Valentino had died. Mencken does not name her but describes her as "discreet as she is charming." Ralph Barton, American artist, was also a devoted friend and used her as the model for Dorothy in his illustrations for Gentlemen Prefer Blondes by Anita Loos. Another admirer was George Gershwin who met her in Hollywood and wrote much of the Second Rhapsody at her Santa Monica, California, home. Her wit, keen intellect and sparkling personality made her a sought-after companion.

After her 1926 divorce from Charles Pringle, Aileen Pringle further focused on her acting career, including Dream of Love (1928) with Joan Crawford and Wall Street (1929) co-starring Ralph Ince, brother of Thomas Ince. However, with the advent of sound film and the resulting influx of actors from the theater, the studios heavily began promoting a new crop of starlets and Pringle's career faded.

During the sound era, she continued to take small parts in major films and even uncredited roles. In 1944 Pringle married the author James M. Cain, but the union lasted only two years and ended in divorce. By the late 1940s, Pringle retired from the screen and lived a wealthy retirement in New York City, where she died in 1989 at the age of 94.

For her contribution to the motion picture industry, Aileen Pringle was awarded a star on the Hollywood Walk of Fame at 6723 Hollywood Blvd. in Los Angeles, California.

== Filmography ==
Year	Film	Role	Notes
1920	The Cost	Olivia	as Aileen Savage; Lost film
1920	The Sport of Kings		as Aileen Savage; Lost film
1920	Earthbound		as Aileen Savage
1920	Stolen Moments	Inez Salles	as Aileen Savage; Short film
1922	Oath-Bound	Alice	Lost film
1922	The Strangers' Banquet	Mrs. Schuyler-Peabody	Lost film
1922	My American Wife	Hortensia deVereta	Lost film
1923	The Christian	Lady Robert Ure	
1923	The Tiger's Claw	Chameli Brentwood	Lost film
1923	Souls for Sale	Lady Jane	
1923	Don't Marry for Money	Edith Martin	Lost film
1923	In the Palace of the King	Princess Eboli	Lost film
1924	Name the Man	Isabelle	
1924	Three Weeks	The Queen	
1924	True As Steel	Mrs. Eva Boutelle	Incomplete film
1924	His Hour	Tamara Loraine	
1924	The Wife of the Centaur	Inez Martin	Lost film
1925	A Thief in Paradise	Rosa Carmino	Lost film
1925	One Year to Live	Elsa Duchanier	Lost film
1925	A Kiss in the Dark	Janet Livingstone	Incomplete film, two reels survive
1925	Wildfire	Claire Barrington	
1925	The Mystic	Zara	
1925	Soul Mates	Velma	
1926	Camille	Estelle	Short film Lost film
1926	The Wilderness Woman	Juneau MacLean	Lost film
1926	The Great Deception	Lois	Lost film
1926	Tin Gods	Janet Stone	Lost film
1927	Adam and Evil	Evelyn Trevelyan	Lost film
1927	Body and Soul	Hilda	
1927	Tea for Three	Doris Langford	Lost film
1928	Wickedness Preferred	Kitty Dare	Lost film
1928	Beau Broadway	Yvonne	Lost film
1928	The Baby Cyclone	Lydia	Lost film
1928	Show People	Herself	Cameo appearance
1928	Dream of Love	The Duchess	Lost film
1929	A Single Man	Mary Hazeltine	Lost film
1929	Night Parade	Paula Vernoff	Incomplete (Library of Congress)
1929	Wall Street	Ann Tabor	
1930	Puttin' On the Ritz	Mrs. Teddy Von Rennsler	
1930	Prince of Diamonds	Eve Marley	
1930	Soldiers and Women	Brenda Ritchie	
1931	Subway Express	Dale Tracy	
1931	Murder at Midnight	Esme Kennedy	
1931	Convicted	Claire Norville	
1932	Police Court	Diana McCormick	
1932	The Age of Consent	Barbara	
1932	The Phantom of Crestwood	Mrs. Herbert Walcott	
1933	By Appointment Only	Diane Manners	
1934	Love Past Thirty	Caroline Burt	
1934	Jane Eyre	Lady Blanche Ingram	
1934	Once to Every Bachelor	Judy Bryant	
1934	Sons of Steel	Enid Chadburne	
1935	Vanessa: Her Love Story	Herries Servant	Uncredited
1936	Wife vs. Secretary	Mrs. Anne Barker	Uncredited
1936	The Unguarded Hour	Diana Roggers	
1936	Piccadilly Jim	Paducah Pomeroy	
1936	Wanted! Jane Turner	Norris' Secretary	Uncredited
1937	Criminal Lawyer	Mrs. Manning	Uncredited
1937	The Last of Mrs. Cheyney	Maria	
1937	John Meade's Woman	Mrs. Melton	
1937	Thanks for Listening	Lulu, Blackmailer Leader	
1937	She's No Lady	Mrs. Douglas	
1937	Nothing Sacred	Mrs. Bullock	Uncredited
1938	Man-Proof	Second Gossipy Woman	Uncredited
1938	Too Hot to Handle	Mrs. Arthur MacArthur	Uncredited
1939	The Hardys Ride High	Miss Booth, Dress Saleslady	
1939	Calling Dr. Kildare	Mrs. Thatcher	Uncredited
1939	Should a Girl Marry?	Mrs. White	
1939	The Women	Miss Carter (saleslady)	Uncredited
1939	The Night of Nights	Dress Saleslady	Uncredited
1941	Appointment for Love	Nurse Gibbons	Uncredited
1941	They Died with Their Boots On	Mrs. Sharp	Uncredited
1942	Between Us Girls	Guest	Uncredited
1943	The Youngest Profession	Miss Farwood	Uncredited
1943	Dr. Gillespie's Criminal Case	Chaperon	Uncredited
1943	Happy Land	Mrs. Prentiss	Uncredited
1944	Since You Went Away	Woman at Cocktail Lounge	Uncredited
1944	A Wave, a WAC and a Marine	Newswoman	
1944	Laura	Woman	Uncredited
