= The Great Meadow =

1931 film

- 1931 theatrical poster
- Directed by: Charles Brabin
- Written by: Edith Ellis; Charles Brabin
- Based on: The Great Meadow; 1930 novel by Elizabeth Madox Roberts
- Produced by: Louis B. Mayer; Irving Thalberg
- Starring: Johnny Mack Brown; Eleanor Boardman
- Cinematography: William H. Daniels; Clyde De Vinna
- Edited by: George Hively
- Music by: William Axt
- Distributed by: Metro-Goldwyn-Mayer
- Release date: January 24, 1931
- Running time: 75 minutes
- Country: United States
- Language: English

The Great Meadow is a 1931 American Pre-Code Western film, produced and distributed by MGM with direction by Charles Brabin. The film starred Eleanor Boardman and Johnny Mack Brown. It is based on the novel The Great Meadow by Elizabeth Madox Roberts, which is similar in theme to Drums Along the Mohawk by Walter D. Edmonds, which was later made into the 1939 film of the same name directed by John Ford. MGM filmed The Great Meadow in a widescreen format called "Realife". However, it is unclear whether it was released in that widescreen process due to declining interest of the movie-going public.

== Plot ==
The title background is a sculpture of an American frontierswoman, a child on her left arm and the barrel of a flintlock in her right hand. The picture is dedicated to the women of the wilderness, "the wives and sweethearts who endured martyrdom for love's sake [and] lie quiet and unsung in the great meadow." The fortitude of women is the focus of most episodes in the film.

In 1777, on their farm in Albemarle County in the Piedmont of Virginia, the Hall family go about their routine, drawing water, feeding chickens, forging tools, plowing rocky hillsides.

In the evening, Thomas Hall reads the latest war news to his family—his wife Molly, their grown son, Rubin, their daughters Diony and Betty, and the youngest child, Samuel. Widow Sally Tolliver also lives with them.

They admire the exploits of young George Washington who has just captured Harlem Heights on Manhattan.

No hands are idle. Rubin dips candles, Diony runs her spinning wheel, Molly works at her loom, Betty tends a pair of lambs and Sally knits. Young Samuel plays with his dog, and tried to get out of stretching deerskins out to dry in the morning; he wants to go hunting instead. His father reminds them that his mother can't make new hunting shirts for them out of wet hides. They are soon joined by a neighbor, Evan Muir, who is clearly smitten with Diony. Evan impresses everyone with the success of his flour mill and of his farm, including 8 cows, "not counting the bull" and 24 hogs, "not counting the boar." Diony teases that he'll have no trouble finding a woman to marry with that "great Noah's Ark." But Evan is soon upstaged by the arrival of Berk Jarvis, with a token for Diony—a beautiful bird fan—and news of a meeting that night in the clearing to hear Daniel Boone speak.

Boone has come to recruit settlers for Kentucky. He describes it as the promised land, with ample game and lush meadows, with rich soil "like cream." He will blaze the trail for them: Southwest to the Holston River and across the Blue Ridge to Mount Powell, from which they will see a white cliff, the gateway to Kentucky, then on to Fort Harrod and the great meadows. Inspired by this speech and ignoring the desperate warnings of Sally Tolliver, whose husband and children were killed by Indians, Berk, his mother Elvira, his younger brother, Jack and several others, including Evan, volunteer. The next day, Berk asks Diony to come with him. He warns her it will be a hard life, but she says as long as she is with him she would choose no other.

The group begins the more-than-500-mile (805-km) trek to Kentucky on Berk and Diony's wedding day.

Their trials begin with the deep grief of parting from family and friends, knowing that they will never meet again. Betty is distraught at losing her sister. Diony weeps, cradled in her mother's lap. Her heart is torn in two. Molly says women's hearts seem made that way. She thought she would be near Diony when she "had a wedded woman's work upon her." Diony laments that she has never been apart from her mother one night since the day she was born, and now they will never see each other again. "Hard it is and bitter," Molly replies. She has faced it twice, first when leaving her own Mammy to help make the land here, and now, is giving Diony. But people who are in each other's thoughts cannot be separated, and she will be thinking on Diony "for my whole enduring life."

Diony joins the waiting train. Thomas gives her two books and charges her to teach her children to read. Samuel, weeping, gives her his dog. Her mother gives her a case of needles and a bag of gourd seeds, "the use-fullest things next to bread." Rubin almost forgets his gift, clutched in his hand, and runs after her; it appears to be a pair of gloves. Samuel's dog runs back to him.

The journey takes much longer than planned as they wade through mud flats, travel up and down mountains and ford rivers. They lose stock, supplies and baggage—including Diony's books—enduring hunger, rockfalls and torrential rain. They fend off Indians, the women shooting "rifles" side by side with the men, and Berk's brother is killed in one such attack.

At last they struggle up and over Mount Powell in a thunderstorm, and Boone's landmark is in sight. After six months' journeying, the ragged survivors stagger into Fort Harrod. People pour out of the gates to welcome them, including the founder of the settlement, Jim Harrod and a flock of women who know exactly what these people have experienced, because they have lived through it themselves, with arms outstretched to help and console the weary travelers.

Eight months later, Diony and Elvira leave the fort to gather corn in their now-abundant fields. An Indian finds them, kills Elvira and scalps her, in front of Diony, before fleeing at the sound of gunshots...

Berk and three other men are about to set out to get salt, necessary for the settlement's survival.

Berk and Diony's child will be born before the men return from the 4-month-long journey. Berk and Diony, who is still recovering from the shock of her mother-in-law's murder, talk about what she will tell their child, a strong boy to be named Tom. And indeed, when the men come back, Diony shows him his son. The community holds a jubilee to celebrate their return. The dance is interrupted by a cry warning that mounted Shawnee are attacking. Black Fox brandishes a length of hair and cries "Squaw Jarvis," enraging Berk. Diony holds him back, but later, their cabin built and the crops in, Berk is driven to seek vengeance. Dione gets him ready...

Months pass... A canoe pulls up to a riverbank and Berk gets out. He was captured by the Cherokee, sold to the British and imprisoned for a year. He has escaped and is striking out for Shawnee country, aiming to trap Black Fox... High in the mountains, Jarvis lures Black Fox out of camp. He seizes the warrior by the throat, strangling him so that he can't call for help. They fight and Jarvis wins, but two men who came out of the camp with Black Fox run to where Berk lies on the ground...

It is winter and a blizzard rages. Diony tries to get out of the cabin to get help but the snow is too deep. She can't make it to the fort, and she can "abide no more." A fur-wrapped figure dragging a sledge behind him struggles to her door. It is Evan, come to help her and to tell her that there is news of Berk—the Shawnee have killed him.

Back in Albemarle, Hall is reading Diony's letter aloud to the family. She tells of how her skills with spindle and loom made it possible for her to make clothing out of nettles and buffalo hair and to teach other women to do the same. The next year she married Evan, and they do very well together. Her mother praises the Lord that Diony's hardships are over.

In the cabin, Diony, with little Tommy standing beside her, welcomes Evan home. Meanwhile, a man on horseback stops at the gate in the palisade. It is Berk, come to the fort looking for Diony. He has kept alive all this time only for the sight of her.

Diony is spinning and Evan is dipping candles. Berk halloos the cabin and immediately embraces Dione. It took him a year to escape the Shawnee; he has been gone more than two years.

Although Berk says he doesn't blame anyone, a confrontation brews and when they start talking about whether they are going to fight with fists or cudgels, Diony stops them cold. She is not property to be fought over. According to the law of the wilderness, it is for her to choose.

Diony tells the story of the last several years, beginning with their marriage, and Berk understands before she finishes—she chooses the man who has been her mainstay for the past two years. Berk goes to the bed, tenderly caresses his sleeping child and moves to leave.

Then Evan says that Diony chose him from duty, there is something greater than duty or right. That's love. He has always known that Berk was the man for her content. He is proud and happy with what they have been to each other. His time with Diony will be like a treasure to him, for his whole enduring life. He leaves, and Diony turns toward a still-stunned Berk.

== Cast ==
- Johnny Mack Brown – Berk Jarvis
- Eleanor Boardman – Diony Hall
- Lucille La Verne – Elvira Jarvis
- Anita Louise – Betty Hall
- Gavin Gordon – Evan Muir
- Guinn "Big Boy" Williams – Rubin Hall
- Russell Simpson – Thomas Hall
- Sarah Padden – Mistress Molly Hall
- Helen Jerome Eddy – Sally Tolliver

unbilled

- William Bakewell – Jack Jarvis
- James Bradbury Jr – Bit
- Heinie Conklin – Bit
- Dale Fuller – Bit
- Lloyd Ingraham – Elly Harmon
- Gardner James – Pioneer
- Paul Kruger – Bit
- Lillian Leighton – Bit
- James A. Marcus – Bit
- Frank McGlynn, Sr. – Bit
- John Miljan – Daniel Boone
