= Tell It to the Marines (1926 film) =

1926 film by George W. Hill

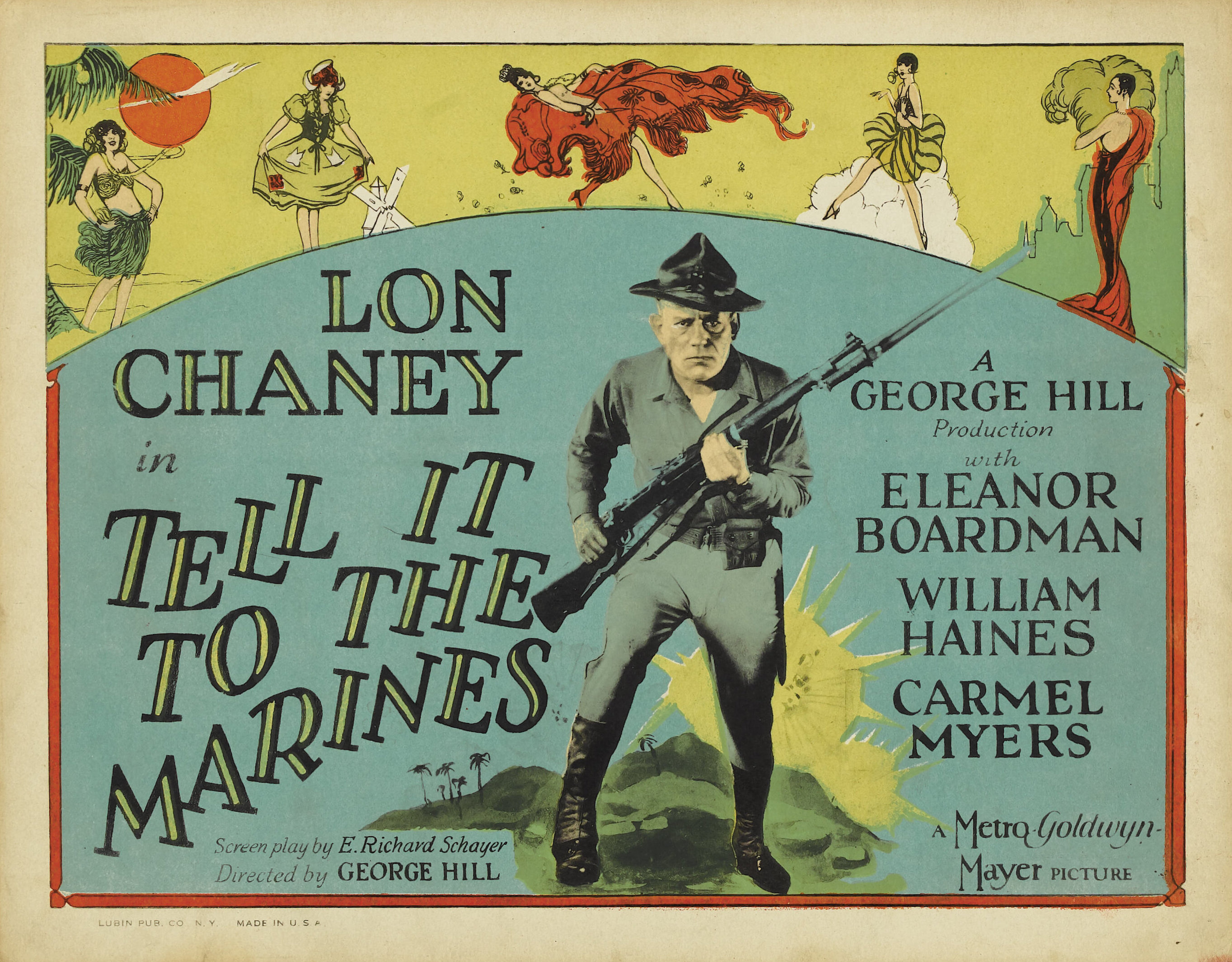
- Lobby card for the film
- Directed by: George W. Hill
- Written by: E. Richard Schayer
- Produced by: George W. Hill
- Starring: Lon Chaney; William Haines; Eleanor Boardman
- Cinematography: Ira H. Morgan
- Edited by: Blanche Sewell
- Production company: Metro-Goldwyn-Mayer
- Distributed by: Metro-Goldwyn-Mayer
- Release date: December 23, 1926
- Running time: 103 minutes
- Country: United States
- Language: Silent (English intertitles)
- Box office: $1,658,000

Tell It to the Marines is a 1926 American silent romantic drama film directed by George W. Hill and starring Lon Chaney, William Haines, and Eleanor Boardman. The film follows a Marine recruit and the sergeant who trains him. It was the biggest box office success of Chaney's career and the second biggest moneymaker of 1926/1927.

== Plot ==
Tell It to the Marines (1926)

In 1924, "Skeet" Burns applies to join the United States Marine Corps, but only to get a free train ride to San Diego, California. When he arrives, he escapes from veteran Marine Sergeant O'Hara and boards another train to "Tia Juana", Mexico for the horse races. However, upon his return, he enlists after all and comes under O'Hara's charge.

At the base, Skeet spots Norma Dale, an attractive Navy nurse. He tries to become better acquainted with her, but his unsubtle, overconfident approach meets with a cold reception. He also discovers that O'Hara is smitten with Norma as well. It becomes clear to O'Hara that Norma does like Skeet when she asks him to take Skeet along on a sea training cruise despite his unsatisfactory performance and attitude. She finds he has already done so. On board ship, Skeet picks a fight with a "gob", a sailor, unaware that his intended victim is actually the Navy heavyweight champion.

O'Hara and his men are assigned to Tondo Island, a dreary naval station described as being "six miles this side of Hell". There, he is tempted by Zaya, a pretty native who is attracted to him. Before things get too serious however, he changes his mind. When she tries to hold onto him, he has to untangle himself from her. This results in a brawl with the outraged locals in which O'Hara has to rescue Skeet. Hearing unflattering gossip about the affair, Norma writes Skeet a letter breaking off their relationship. Skeet mistakenly believes O'Hara told her about the incident in order to improve his own romantic chances with Norma.

The Marines are relieved and are sent to join the Asiatic Squadron, stationed at Shanghai, China. O'Hara and Skeet find Norma there where is she is serving on a Navy hospital ship; she greets the sergeant warmly, but refuses to give Skeet a second chance. She and other nurses are then sent to Hangchow to deal with an epidemic. When news arrives that a bandit army is threatening the city, the Marines are ordered to the rescue. During the tense evacuation, O'Hara and his men are chosen to be the rear guard at a bridge. Fierce fighting breaks out. When O'Hara is wounded, he orders Skeet to rejoin the column, but Skeet refuses to obey. The detachment is saved by the timely arrival of an aerial squadron.

After his four-year enlistment ends, Skeet and Norma buy a ranch, in which Skeet offers O'Hara a partnership. However, the old veteran declines, saying that he and the Marine Corps are made for each other.

== Cast ==
- Lon Chaney as Sergeant O'Hara
- William Haines as Private George Robert "Skeet" Burns
- Eleanor Boardman as Nurse Norma Dale
- Eddie Gribbon as Corporal Madden, Skeet's friend
- Carmel Myers as Zaya
- Warner Oland as Chinese bandit leader
- Mitchell Lewis as Native starting fight
- Frank Currier as General Wilcox
  He shares a train compartment with Skeet at the beginning of the film and is unamused by Skeet's reason for "enlisting"
- Maurice E. Kains as Harry (as Maurice Kains)

== Background ==
The film premiered in New York City on December 23, 1926.

MGM brought in General Smedley D. Butler, commander of the Marine base in San Diego and subsequently the author of the anti-war book War Is a Racket, for technical consultation on the film. Lon Chaney formed a close friendship with the Marine Corps general which lasted for the rest of Chaney's life. A writer in Leatherneck Magazine wrote that "few of us who observed Chaney's portrayal of his role were not carried away to the memory of some sergeant we had known whose behavior matched that of the actor in every minute detail ..." For his role in the film, Chaney became the first film star chosen to be an honorary Marine.

The studio was also allowed to shoot on Marine Corps Recruit Depot San Diego which made Tell It to the Marines the first motion picture made with the full cooperation of the U.S. Marine Corps. Battleship USS California (later involved in the attack on Pearl Harbor on December 7, 1941) was used for the scenes at sea and the final sequence of the film, where the Marines rescue the hostages, was filmed at Iverson Ranch in Chatsworth, California, the location for such films as Fort Apache and The Good Earth.

The film was shot concurrently with Pathé's film serial The Fighting Marine with Gene Tunney and Fox's What Price Glory? leading MGM and Fox to bicker over which studio had rights to use the name of the U.S. Marine Corps. The films began a genre of films depicting the Marines putting down insurrections around the world until RKO's The Marines Fly High (1940) when World War II exploits became the norm.

== Box office ==
The film was a major commercial success. In North America alone, the film earned $1,250,000 in domestic rentals.
