= Eleanor Boardman =

American film actress (1898–1991)

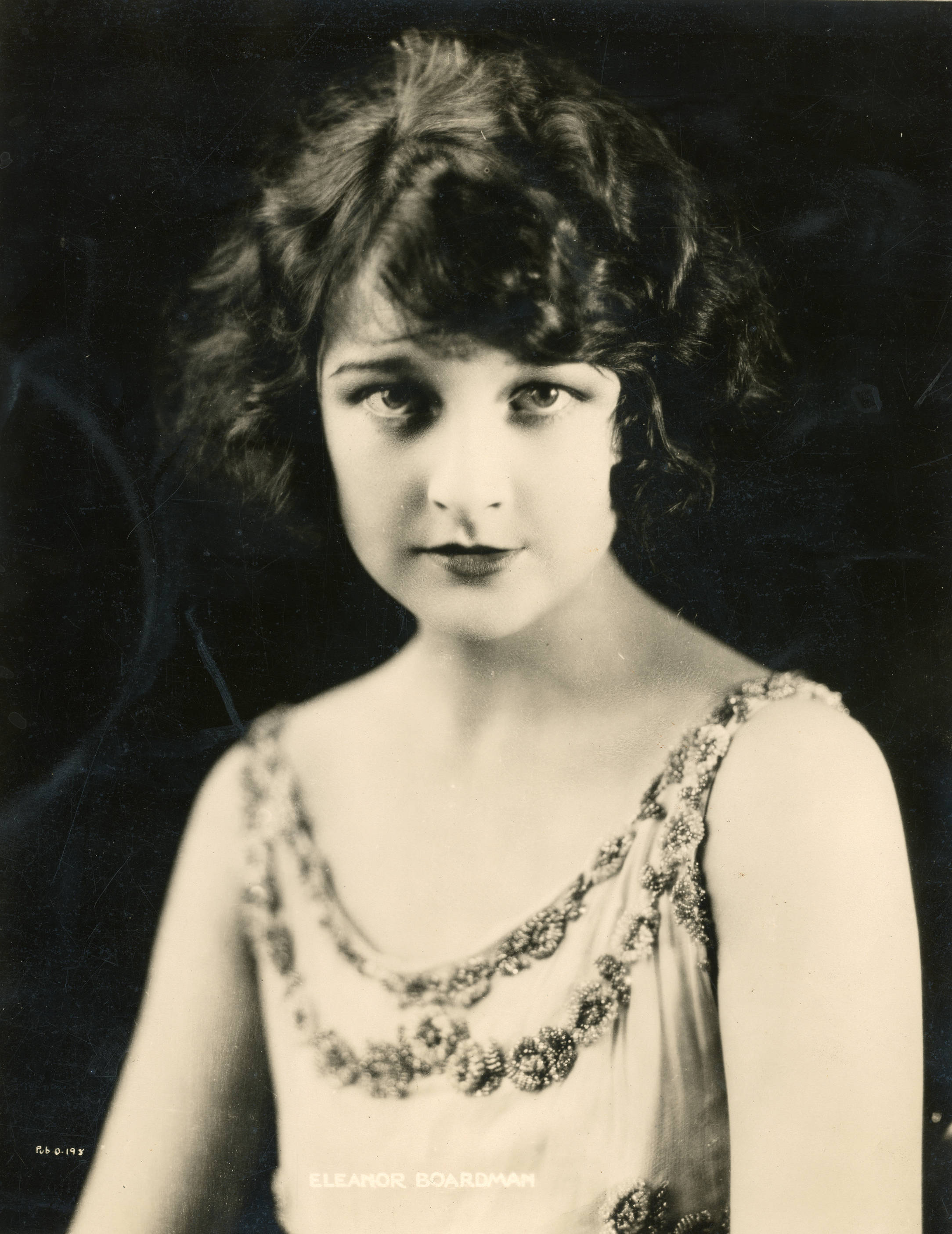
- Boardman in 1923
- Born: Olive Eleanor Boardman; August 19, 1898; Philadelphia, Pennsylvania, U.S.
- Died: December 12, 1991 (aged 93); Santa Barbara, California, U.S.
- Other names: Eleanor Vidor; Eleanor d'Arrast
- Occupation: Actress
- Years active: 1922–1935
- Spouses: King Vidor (m. 1926; div. 1933) Harry d'Abbadie d'Arrast (m. 1940; died 1968)
- Children: 2

Olive Eleanor Boardman (August 19, 1898 – December 12, 1991) was an American film actress of the silent era.

== Early life and career ==
Olive Eleanor Boardman was born on August 19, 1898, the youngest child of George W. Boardman and Janice Merriam "Jennie" Stockman Boardman. She had two older sisters named Merriam and Esther. In 1920, she was working as a contractor.

Educated in Philadelphia, Boardman originally acted on stage, but she lost her voice while starring in The National Anthem. She then entered a nationwide contest for new actors and actresses for silent films. She was chosen from among 1,000 competitors by Goldwyn Pictures as their "New Face of 1922". Her initial screen test was unsuccessful, but a second test resulted in a contract. After several successful supporting roles, she played the lead in Souls for Sale in 1923. That same year, Boardman's growing popularity was reflected by her inclusion on the list of WAMPAS Baby Stars.

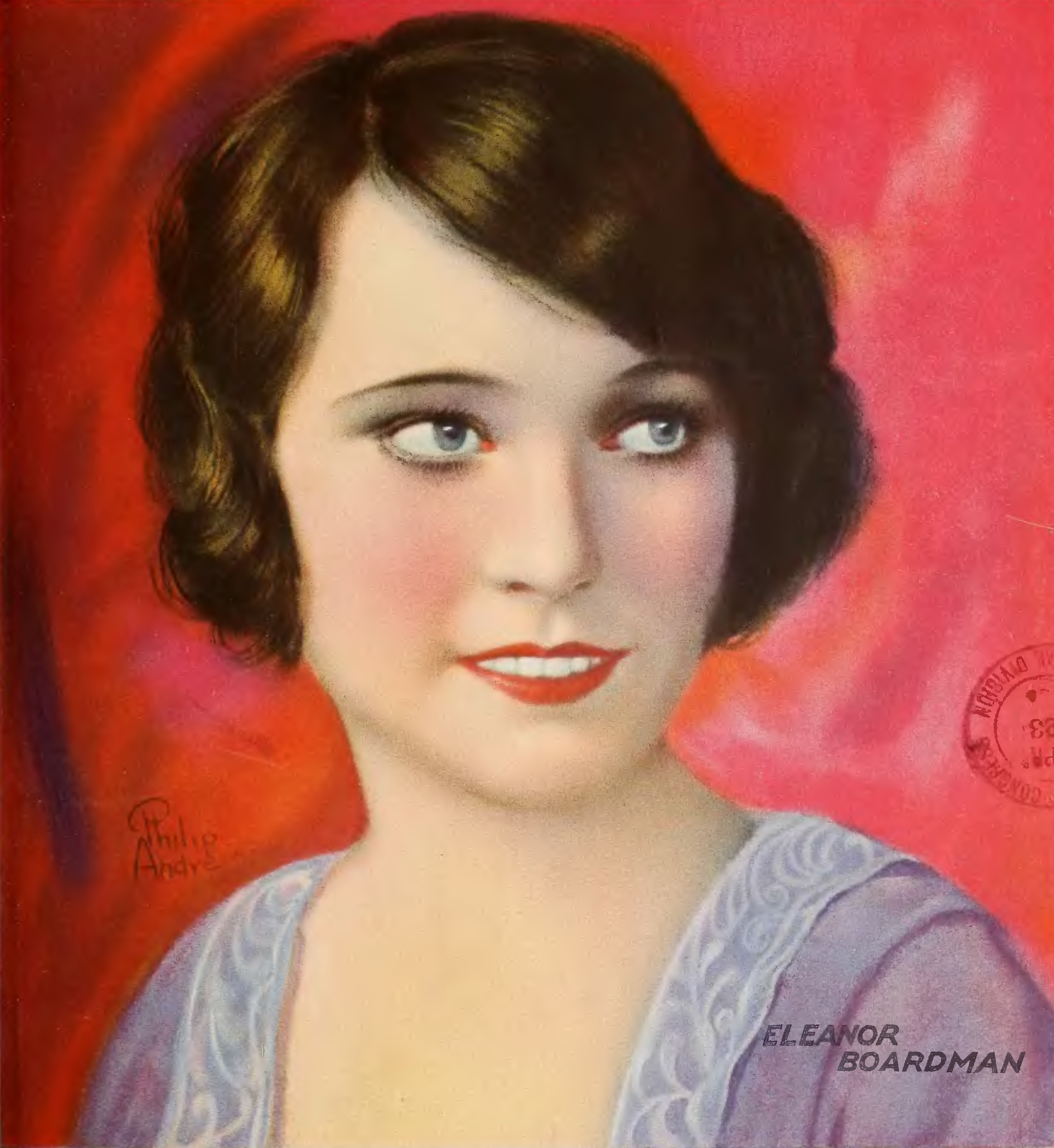
Eleanor Boardman cover art from June 1926 issue of Picture-Play Magazine

She appeared in more than 30 films during her career, including director King Vidor's The Crowd (1928). Her performance in that film is widely recognized as one of the outstanding performances in American silent film. In 1932, after some success in sound films, she parted ways with MGM. Her final film was The Three Cornered Hat, which was made in Spain in 1935. After that production, she retired from acting and retreated from Hollywood. Her last appearances were in an interview filmed for Kevin Brownlow and David Gill's British documentary series Hollywood (1980) and the series MGM: When the Lion Roars (1992).

== Personal life ==
Boardman was married to film director King Vidor, with whom she had two daughters, Antonia and Belinda. They married in 1926 and were divorced on April 11, 1933. Fellow actors John Gilbert and Greta Garbo had allegedly planned a double wedding with them, but Garbo broke the plans at the last minute.

On May 23, 1929, a federal grand jury returned an indictment that charged Boardman with evading income tax payments in 1925, 1926, and 1927. Simultaneously, an information filed in federal court accused Vidor of income tax evasion in 1925 and 1926. J. Marjorie Berger, an income tax counselor in Hollywood, had earlier been indicted on charges of preparing a false income tax return for the couple for 1925.

Boardman's second husband was Harry d'Abbadie d'Arrast, to whom she was married from 1940. She divided her time between the United States and their chateau in the Pyrenees Mountains. After her husband's death in 1968, she permanently relocated to the United States, where she settled into Montecito, California, living in a house she designed.

== Death ==
Boardman died in her sleep at her Santa Barbara, California, home on December 12, 1991, at the age of 93. Her ashes were scattered in Santa Barbara near her home.

== Recognition ==
For her contributions to the film industry, Boardman has a motion pictures star on the Hollywood Walk of Fame. Her star is located at 6928 Hollywood Boulevard.

== Filmography ==
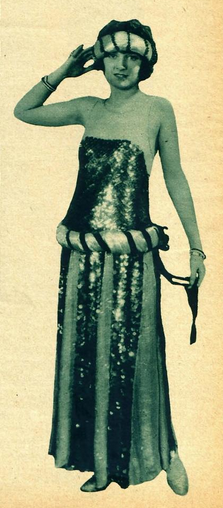
Boardman depicted in Picture Play magazine, 1923

Year	Title	Role	Notes
1922	The Strangers' Banquet	Jean McPherson	Lost film
1923	Gimme	Clothilde Kingsley	Lost film
1923	Vanity Fair	Amelia Sedley	Lost film
1923	Souls for Sale	Miss Remember Steddon	
1923	Three Wise Fools	Rena Fairchild / Sydney Fairfield	
1923	The Day of Faith	Jane Maynard	Lost film
1924	True as Steel	Ethel Parry	Incomplete film
1924	Wine of Youth	Mary Hollister	
1924	Sinners in Silk	Penelope Stevens	Lost film
1924	The Turmoil	Mary Vertrees	
1924	The Silent Accuser	Barbara Jane	Lost film
1924	So This Is Marriage?	Beth Marsh	Lost film
1924	The Wife of the Centaur	Joan Converse	Lost film
1925	The Way of a Girl	Rosamond	
1925	Proud Flesh	Fernanda	
1925	The Circle	Elizabeth Cheney	
1925	Exchange of Wives	Margaret Rathburn	
1925	The Only Thing	Thyra, Princess of Svendborg	
1925	The Auction Block	Lorelei Knight	Lost film
1926	Memory Lane	Mary	
1926	Bardelys the Magnificent	Roxalanne de Lavedan	
1926	Tell It to the Marines	Nurse Norma Dale	
1928	The Crowd	Mary	
1928	Diamond Handcuffs	Tillie	
1929	She Goes to War	Joan	
1930	Mamba	Helen von Linden	
1930	Redemption	Lisa	
1931	The Great Meadow	Diony Hall	
1931	The Flood	Joan Marshall	
1931	Women Love Once	Helen Fields	
1931	The Squaw Man	Lady Diana Kerhill	
1935	The Three Cornered Hat	The Miller's Wife	
