= The Price of Things =

1930 film

- Directed by: Elinor Glyn
- Written by: Juliet Rhys-Williams
- Based on: The Price of Things by Elinor Glyn
- Produced by: Elinor Glyn
- Starring: Elissa Landi; Stewart Rome; Mona Goya
- Cinematography: Charles Rosher
- Production company: Elinor Glyn Productions
- Distributed by: United Artists
- Release date: 2 July 1930
- Running time: 84 minutes
- Country: United Kingdom
- Language: English

The Price of Things is a 1930 British crime drama film directed by Elinor Glyn and starring Elissa Landi, Stewart Rome and Mona Goya. It was written by Juliet Rhys-Williams based on Glyn's 1919 novel of the same title, and was made as an independent production at the Elstree Studios of British International Pictures, released by United Artists. It was one of two films Glyn directed that year based on her own novels; the other was Knowing Men.

== Cast ==
- Elissa Landi as Anthea Dane
- Stewart Rome as Dick Hammond
- Walter Tennyson as John Courtenay Dare
- Mona Goya as Natasha Boleska
- Dino Galvani as Hunya
- Marjorie Loring as Daphne

== Reception ==
Film Weekly wrote: "In making this film in England Madame Glyn showed commendable enterprise; but unfortunately she has completely missed the bull's-eye. It may be something in the climate, or the general atmosphere: anyway, The Price of Things is as unlike any of the successful films with which Madame was associated in America as one cares to imagine. The unbelievable story may even be credible in the novel but on the screen, indifferently presented as it is, it provokes laughter more than any complimentary demonstration."

Kine Weekly wrote: "A highly coloured melodrama of love, mistaken identity, and espionage, which gives a distorted impression of high society life, and never rings true. The presentation is elaborate, and this, together with the glamour attached to the authoress' name, represent the only booking angle."

The Daily Film Renter wrote: "Novelettish in the supremely novelettish manner of a decade ago, Elinor Glyn's story, crowding situation on extravagant situation, is cinema fare for servant girls and duchesses, whom it may distract and entertain. The great middle class will find it ludicrous, but as a film it is quite a good joke."

== Bibliography ==
- Barnett, Vincent L. & Weedon, Alexis. Elinor Glyn as Novelist, Moviemaker, Glamour Icon and Businesswoman. Routledge, 2016.
