= Ritzy (disambiguation) =

Ritzy is a lost 1927 silent film

Ritzy may also refer to:

- Ritzy Bryan of The Joy Formidable
- Ritzy Lee of The Del-Vikings
- Ritzy, 1990s nightclub in Nottingham "Call Me"
- The Ritzy Cinema in Brixton
