= His Hour =

1924 film directed by King Vidor

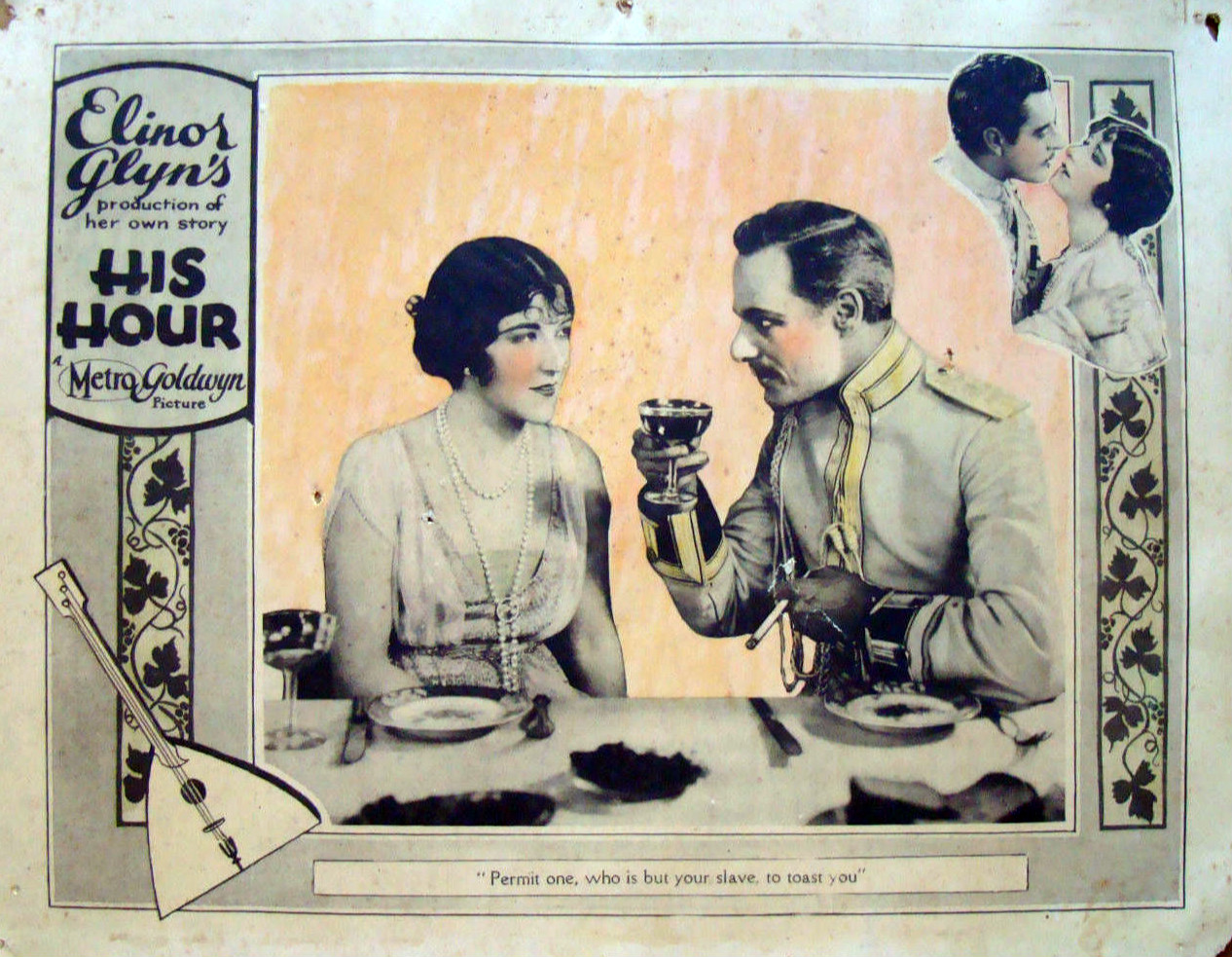
- Lobby card
- Directed by: King Vidor
- Written by: Maude Fulton (intertitles); Elinor Glyn; King Vidor (intertitles)
- Produced by: Irving Thalberg
- Starring: Aileen Pringle
- Cinematography: John J. Mescall
- Distributed by: Metro-Goldwyn-Mayer
- Release date: September 29, 1924
- Running time: 70 minutes
- Country: United States
- Language: Silent (English intertitles)
- Budget: $197,000
- Box office: $595,000

His Hour is a 1924 American silent drama film directed by King Vidor. This film was the follow-up to Samuel Goldwyn's Three Weeks, written by Elinor Glyn, and starring Aileen Pringle, one of the biggest moneymakers at the time of the Metro-Goldwyn-Mayer amalgamation.

== Plot ==
Gritzko is a Russian nobleman and Tamara is the object of his desire.

== Cast ==
- Aileen Pringle as Tamara Loraine
- John Gilbert as Gritzko
- Emily Fitzroy as Princess Ardacheff
- Lawrence Grant as Stephen Strong
- Dale Fuller as Olga Gleboff
- Mario Carillo as Count Valonne
- Jacqueline Gadsden as Tatiane Shebanoff (credited as Jacquelin Gadsdon)
- George Waggner as Sasha Basmanoff (credited as George Waggoner)
- Carrie Clark Ward as Princess Murieska
- Bertram Grassby as Boris Varishkine
- Jill Reties as Sonia Zaieskine
- Wilfred Gough as Lord Courtney
- Frederick Vroom as English Minister
- Mathilde Comont as Fat Harem Lady
- E. Eliazaroff as Khedive
- David Mir as Serge Greskoff
- Bert Sprotte as Ivan
- George Beranger as (credited as Andre Beranger)
- Virginia Adair (uncredited)
- Rowfat-Bey Haliloff as Dancer (uncredited)
- Mike Mitchell (uncredited)
- Jack Parker as Child (uncredited)
- Thais Valdemar (uncredited)

== Production ==
His Hour marked the first of five pictures that John Gilbert and King Vidor would make together for M-G-M. Adapted from a 1910 novel by Elinor Glyn, an author of torrid romances chic in the 19th century, His Hour was Vidor's attempt to tap into the popularity of Jazz Age "flaming-youth" pictures dealing with marital infidelity. The movie includes many titillating seduction scenes, one of which was deemed too salacious for release. Produced under the strictures of the new Production Code, producer Louis B. Mayer censured Vidor for incorporating some of Glyn's “hot-cheeked” depictions of sexual decadence.

A former officer of the Russian Imperial Army, by now living in Los Angeles, served as a technical adviser on the film. His actual name has not been confirmed; however, the studio press releases referred to him as Mike Mitchell. This film marked the first of four times that John Gilbert and King Vidor would work together. Despite showcasing his riding ability and appearance, Gilbert hated the script and felt it gave him nothing substantial to do as an actor.

== Reception ==
In this, Gilbert's first film with King Vidor, audiences were impressed with the star as a romantic leading man

== Box office ==
According to MGM's records, the film made a profit of $159,000. MGM sent Elinor Glynn records which stated the film cost $211,930 and earned $317,442 resulting in a profit of only $105,511. This meant Glynn, who was entitled to 33.3% of net profits, earned $35,170.

== Preservation ==
A print of His Hour with Czech intertitles is located at the Museum of Modern Art in New York.
