= Three Weeks (book) =

1907 novel by Elinor Glyn

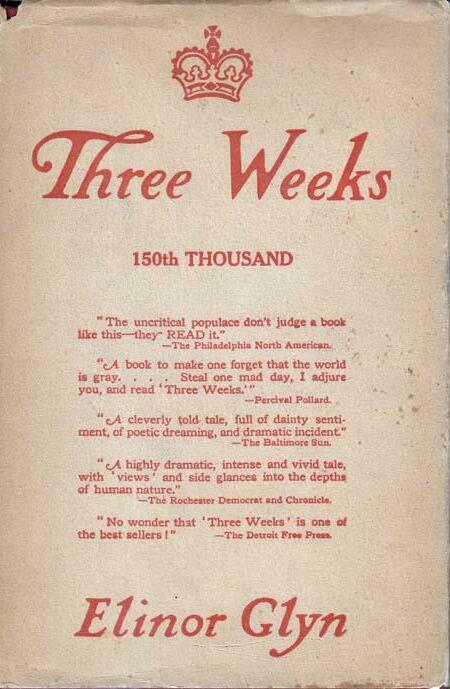
- 1907 cover
- Author: Elinor Glyn
- Language: English
- Genre: Erotic romance
- Publisher: Gerald Duckworth
- Publication date: 1907
- Publication place: United Kingdom
- Media type: Hardcover

Three Weeks is a 1907 erotic romance novel by Elinor Glyn.

== Plot ==
Paul Verdayne, wealthy English nobleman in his early twenties, is caught embracing the parson's daughter. His parents decide to send him away to France and then Switzerland. In Switzerland, he sees a woman referred to only as "the Lady". The Lady is older, in her thirties. After several days of exchanging lustful glances, they actually meet. She invites him to her apartment, where they share a sexual relationship for three weeks. Eventually, Paul learns the Lady is actually the queen of a Russian dependency and her husband, the king, is abusive towards her. She disappears after the titular three weeks; Paul is upset and returns to England. Paul later discovers that the Lady has given birth to their son. With his father's assistance, he finds out the Lady's identity; however, before they can meet again, she is murdered by her husband. Paul is upset and spends the next five years wandering around from country to country, until he decides to make preparations to meet his son.

== Reception ==
Critical reception was negative in the United Kingdom and United States. The book was described as disjointed, "dull and stupid", "boring, vulgar and extremely silly". Critics also made personal attacks on Glyn, saying she was complacent, her writing immature, and she was "indifferent to her own reputation".

When the novel was published in the United States by Duffield & Co., it was quite popular, selling 50,000 copies in the first three weeks. After that, it sold on average about 2,000 copies per day for the next three months. The book's subject matter made it a specific target of the Boston-based Watch and Ward Society's anti-vice campaigns.

== Adaptations ==
Three Weeks was first made into an American motion picture in 1914, directed by Perry N. Vekroff and starring Madlaine Traverse and George C. Pearce. In 1917 a Hungarian version titled Három hét was directed by Márton Garas. It was adapted again in the 1924 version, made by Samuel Goldwyn, directed by Alan Crosland under the supervision of Glyn, and starring Conrad Nagel and Aileen Pringle. In 1977 it was adapted for Thames Television in a romance series with Moths by Ouida, The Black Knight by Ethel M. Dell, High Noon by Ruby M. Ayres, Emily by Jilly Cooper and House of Men by Catherine Marchant.

== In popular culture ==
- A sexual scene in Three Weeks inspired the doggerel:

Would you like to sin
With Elinor Glyn
On a tiger skin?
Or would you prefer
To err with her
On some other fur?

- The 1915 film Pimple's Three Weeks (Without the Option), starring British comedian Fred Evans, is a burlesque of the novel.
- In S. J. Perelman's series of pieces Cloudland Revisited, he re-reads and describes the risqué novels that had thrilled him as a youth. Tuberoses and Tigers deals with Glyn's Three Weeks. Perelman described it as "servant-girl literature" and called Glyn's style "marshmallow". He also mentions the 1924 film version of the book in which he recalled Goldwyn's "seductive" image of Pringle "lolling on a tiger skin..."
- In the 1924 silent movie The Family Secret, the nurse maid for Baby Peggy's character reads the book to her as part of reading time, but Kerry sneaks away.
- The 1925 silent movie Seven Chances shows a telephone operator reading the book on the job between calls.
- The 1930 Disney short The Shindig shows Clarabelle Cow reading the novel; as a result, The Shindig was banned in Ohio.
- In Evelyn Waugh's 1952 novel Men at Arms (the first of the Sword of Honour trilogy), an (RAF) Air Marshal recites the poem upon spotting a polar bear rug by the fire in a London club, of which he has just wangled membership (p. 125). To this, another member responds: "Who the hell is Elinor Glyn?" The Air Marshal replies: "Oh, just a name, you know, put in to make it rhyme." This was both a snub to the Air Marshal and a literary snubbing of Glyn by Waugh.
- The 1962 film adaptation of the musical The Music Man has the librarian asking Mrs. Shinn if she wouldn't want her daughter reading a classic rather than Elinor Glyn. Mrs. Shinn replies that "What Elinor Glyn reads is her mother's problem."
- The 1973 film Blood for Dracula, directed by Paul Morrissey, has the character Rubinia (a potential "bride" of the Count) mention that she is reading Three Weeks. This is used as a subtle comedic touch, as the Count is searching for a virginal victim.
- The 1977 British television series Romance includes an episode based on Three Weeks, adapted by Gerald Savory, directed by Waris Hussein, starring Elizabeth Shepherd and Simon MacCorkindale.
