= The Shindig =

1930 film by Burt Gillett

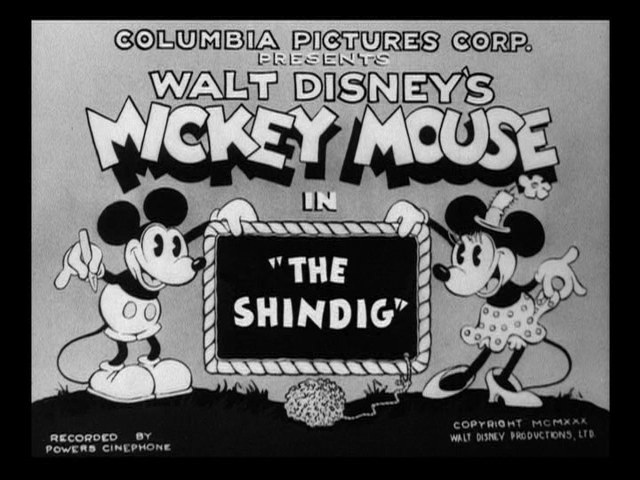
- Title card
- Directed by: Burt Gillett
- Produced by: Walt Disney
- Starring: Walt Disney; Marcellite Garner
- Music by: Bert Lewis
- Animation by: Dick Lundy; Ben Sharpsteen
- Production company: Walt Disney Studios
- Distributed by: Columbia Pictures
- Release date: July 11, 1930
- Running time: 7:02
- Country: United States
- Language: English

The Shindig is a 1930 American animated short film directed by Burt Gillett. It was released on July 11, 1930. It is the twentieth film of the Mickey Mouse film series.

Due to being published in 1930, the cartoon entered the public domain on January 1, 2026.

The film

== Plot ==
Mickey and Minnie are in the back of a long car packed with animals, singing "A-Hunting We Will Go" as they travel to the big Barn Dance. Horace picks up Clarabelle in his rickety motorcycle, and she rides in the wheelbarrow used as a sidecar.

At the dance, Mickey and Minnie play "Turkey in the Straw" on piano and violin for an appreciative crowd of farm animals. The audience applauds, and the mice play "Pop Goes the Weasel". Mickey imaginatively uses a pail, a washtub and even Minnie's undies to play the song, but she does not appreciate his creativity and slaps his hand away.

He then plays a medley of "Old Folks at Home" and “Down Home Rag” on harmonica, and tap dances. Minnie continues the latter song on piano, and Clarabelle does an energetic solo dance. Mickey dances with Clarabelle, a dachsund, and Patricia Pigg. At the end of the number, Patricia jumps while Mickey attempts to dive under her to the other side. However the 4th time she jumps, Mickey trips and Petunia lands upon him.

== Production ==
Early in the short, Clarabelle is seen reading the 1907 erotic romance novel Three Weeks. When Horace pulls her tail to indicate that he has come to visit, she hides it under her bed of straw, and puts on a dress to cover her udders. Three Weeks was so controversial that The Shindig was banned in Ohio.

== Voice cast ==
- Mickey Mouse: Walt Disney
- Minnie Mouse: Marcellite Garner
- Clarabelle Cow: Marcellite Garner
- Horace Horsecollar: Walt Disney

== Reception ==
The Film Daily (September 14, 1930): "Okay. A barnyard setting supplies the locale for this Mickey Mouse performance, which consists of the animals conducting a hoofing spree, with Minnie Mouse doing honors at the piano. Right up to the usual standard of the Mickey Mouse cartoon series."

Variety (January 7, 1931): "Average cartoon comedy revealing no unusual features. It's a barn involving all the animals in the yard. Customary antics and flippancies for smiles rather than laughs. Always okay for the youngsters."

== Home media ==
The short was released on December 7, 2004, on Walt Disney Treasures: Mickey Mouse in Black and White, Volume Two: 1929-1935.

== Television ==
The short was shown on The Mickey Mouse Club (season 1, episode 54).

== See also ==
- Mickey Mouse (film series)
