= Three Weeks (1924 film) =

1924 film by Alan Crosland

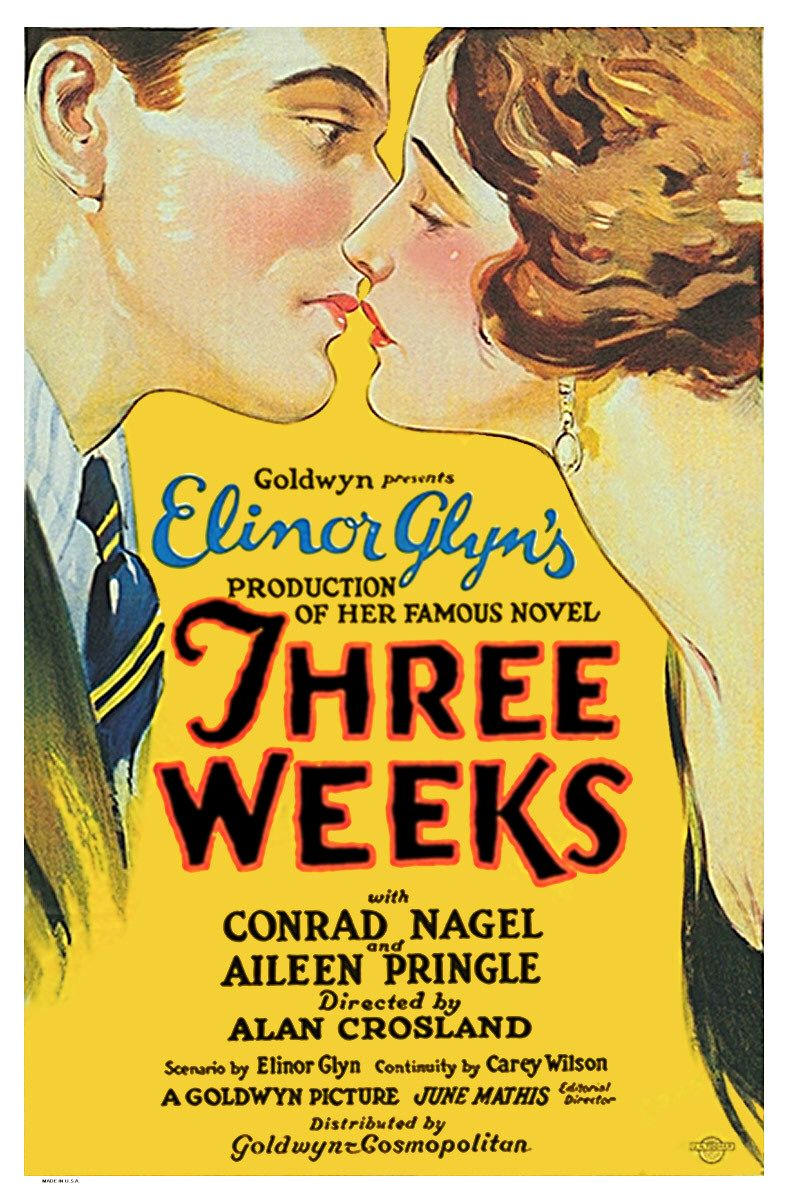
- Three Weeks poster
- Directed by: Alan Crosland
- Written by: Carey Wilson; Elinor Glyn
- Based on: Three Weeks by Elinor Glyn
- Produced by: Samuel Goldwyn
- Starring: Aileen Pringle; Conrad Nagel
- Cinematography: John J. Mescall
- Distributed by: Goldwyn Pictures
- Release date: February 10, 1924
- Running time: 80 minutes
- Country: United States
- Language: Silent (English intertitles)
- Budget: $314,728.05
- Box office: $477,553.28

Three Weeks is a 1924 American drama film directed by Alan Crosland. The movie is based on the 1907 novel of the same name by Elinor Glyn, and the title refers to the length of an affair by the Queen of Sardalia. Formerly a lost film, the FIAF database indicates a print is preserved by Russia's Gosfilmofond. That print formed the basis of a restoration by La Cineteca del Friuli.

The novel had previously been made into the American film in 1914, directed by Perry N. Vekroff and starring Madlaine Traverse and George C. Pearce, and in a 1917 Hungarian film titled Három hét that was directed by Márton Garas. The 1924 production was the first to be authorized and supervised by Glyn, which was noted in advertising for the film.

== Plot ==
As described in a film magazine review, the Queen of Sardalia, in a bad marriage with the brutal King Constantine II, leaves her dissipated husband for a trip to Switzerland. There she meets Paul Verdayne, a young Englishman, who becomes her lover. The King sends men to kill Paul, but he escapes them. After three weeks the Queen bids him farewell without revealing her identity. Three years later she sends for him. The lovers meet again, but she is slain by the King, who in turn dies at the hand of a servant. As time passes Paul becomes a great British statesman. Visiting Sardalia, he sees his son reigning as monarch of that country.

== Cast ==
- Aileen Pringle as The Queen
- Conrad Nagel as Paul Verdayne
- John St. Polis as The King
- H. Reeves-Smith as Sir Charles Verdayne
- Stuart Holmes as Petrovich
- Mitchell Lewis as Vassili
- Robert Cain as Verchoff
- Nigel De Brulier as Dimitri
- Claire de Lorez as Mitze
- Dale Fuller as Anna
- Helen Dunbar as Lady Henrietta Verdayne
- Alan Crosland Jr. as Young King of Sardalia
- Joan Standing as Isabella
- William Haines as Curate
- George Tustain as Captain of the Guards

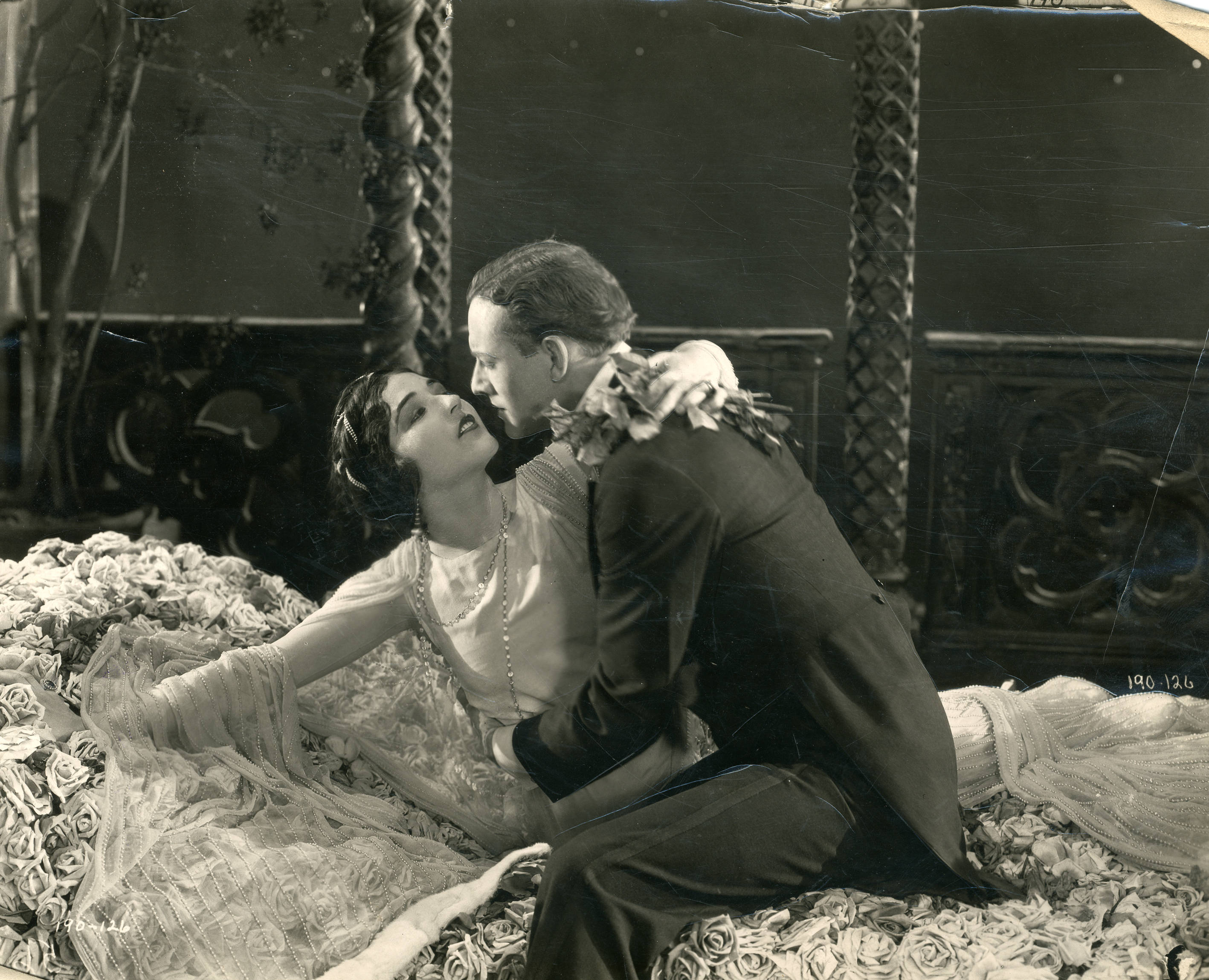
Aileen Pringle and Conrad Nagel

== Production ==
For a well known scene from the novel involving the Queen and a tiger skin, Glyn's script states that, rather than describing it, she would enact it for director Crosland on the set. In the film, the Queen is lying on a tiger skin provided by Paul when he comes into the room. She tells him to sit in a chair and then, shown from Paul's point of view, the Queen spreads herself on the tiger skin, runs her hands through the fur, arches her back, and closes her eyes, signifying her agreement to their affair.

== Reception ==
According to contemporary records, the film made a profit of $162,825.23. Glyn was entitled to 40% of the profits and earned $65,130.

== Preservation status ==
Three Weeks survives with a copy in the Gosfilmofond archive in Moscow. That copy formed the basis of a digital restoration by La Cineteca del Friuli in which missing opening credits and intertitles were re-created.
