= The Only Thing =

1925 film by Jack Conway

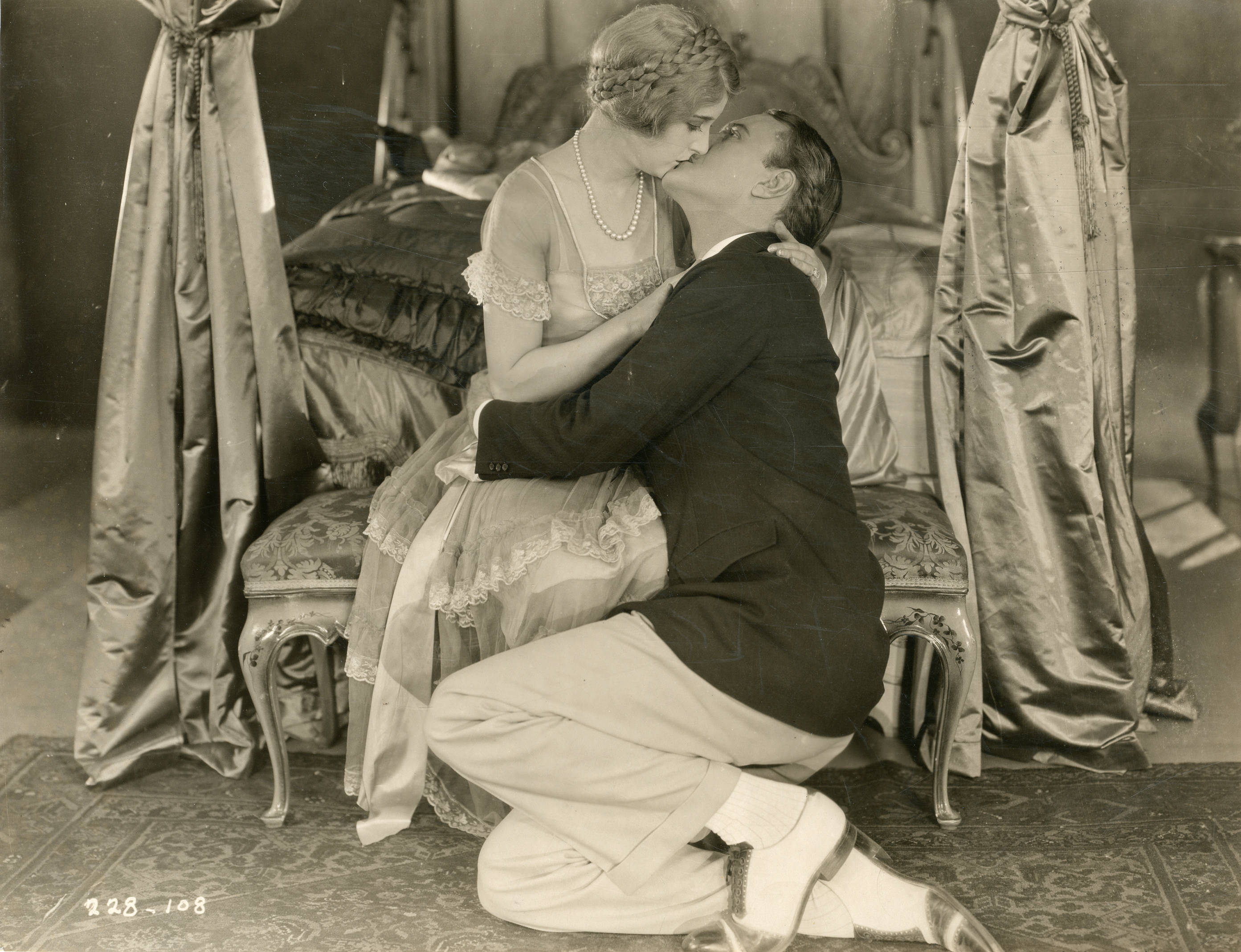
- Film still
- Directed by: Jack Conway
- Written by: Elinor Glyn
- Based on: The Only Thing by Elinor Glyn
- Starring: Eleanor Boardman; Conrad Nagel; Edward Connelly
- Cinematography: Chester A. Lyons
- Production company: Metro-Goldwyn-Mayer
- Distributed by: Metro-Goldwyn-Mayer
- Release date: November 22, 1925
- Running time: 6 reels
- Country: United States
- Language: Silent (English intertitles)

The Only Thing (also known under its working title Four Flaming Days) is a 1925 American silent romantic drama film starring Eleanor Boardman. The film's scenario was written by author Elinor Glyn (who also oversaw the film's production), and was based on a story adapted from Glyn's novel of the same name.

It was the first film Jack Conway directed for Metro-Goldwyn-Mayer where he remained for until his retirement in 1948. The film is also notable for featuring a young Joan Crawford in her eighth film role playing a minor part as a lady in waiting.

== Plot ==
As described in a review in a film magazine, a handsome and titled Englishman visits a Balkan kingdom and falls madly in love with a young princess who has come to marry the elderly, grouchy, and ugly king. He determines to save her even against her will and so daring and ardent is his lovemaking that she is about to consent when she determines that duty to the state comes first. A revolution occurs and the hero, when he finds that death has been decreed for all aristocrats, who are tied in pairs and send out to drown in leaky barges, contrives to be paired with her. A warship sent by her country saves them and they find happiness together.

== Cast ==
- Eleanor Boardman as Thyra, Princess of Svendborg
- Conrad Nagel as Duke of Chevenix
- Edward Connelly as King of Chekia
- Arthur Edmund Carewe as Gigberto
- Louis Payne as Lord Charles Vane
- Vera Lewis as Princess Erek
- Carrie Clark Ward as Princess Anne
- Constance Wylie as Countess Arline
- Dale Fuller as Governess
- Ned Sparks as Gibson
- Mario Carillo as Prime Minister
- David Mir as Kaylkur
- Mary Hawes as Thyra's Maid
- Michael Pleschkoff as Captain of the Guards
- Joan Crawford as Party Guest (uncredited)
- Tom Tyler as Party Guest (uncredited)

== Censorship ==
Before the film could be exhibited in Kansas, the Kansas Board of Review required the elimination of the Duke kissing a woman on her neck and breast, and to shorten a kissing scene.

== Preservation ==
A complete print of The Only Thing is held in the George Eastman Museum Motion Picture Collection.
