= Love's Blindness =

1926 film by John Francis Dillon

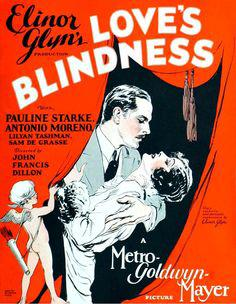
- Directed by: John Francis Dillon
- Written by: Elinor Glyn
- Starring: Pauline Starke; Antonio Moreno; Lilyan Tashman
- Cinematography: John Arnold
- Production company: Metro-Goldwyn-Mayer
- Distributed by: Metro-Goldwyn-Mayer
- Release date: December 4, 1926
- Running time: 70 minutes
- Country: United States
- Language: Silent (English intertitles)
- Budget: $233,814
- Box office: $224,879

Love's Blindness is a 1926 American silent drama film directed by John Francis Dillon. The film stars Pauline Starke, Antonio Moreno, and Lilyan Tashman. Written by Elinor Glyn, the film was produced under the direct supervision of the author.

== Plot ==
In Great Britain, Hubert Culverdale is the hard-up and hard-to-please milord who marries luscious Vanessa Levy for financial reasons only.

== Cast ==
- Pauline Starke as Vanessa Levy
- Antonio Moreno as Hubert Culverdale, 8th Earl of St. Austel
- Lilyan Tashman as Alice, Duchess of Lincolnwood
- Sam De Grasse as Benjamin Levy
- Douglas Gilmore as Charles Langley
- Kate Price as Marchioness of Hurlshire
- Tom Ricketts as Marquis of Hurlshire
- Earl Metcalfe as Col. Ralph Dangerfield
- George Waggner as Oscar Issacson
- Rose Dione as Mme. De Jainon
- Ned Sparks as Valet
- John D. Bloss (uncredited, Wedding Scene)
- Macon Jones (uncredited, Wedding Scene)
- Walter Tennyson (uncredited, Undetermined Supporting Role)

== Production ==
While author Glyn, in agreeing to supervise the production of Love's Blindness, received $50,000 as an advance against her 33 percent share of the profits, the film did not turn a profit.

== Preservation ==
Love's Blindness is considered to be a lost film with just a fragment surviving at the BFI National Archive in London.
