= Beyond the Rocks (film) =

1922 film by Sam Wood

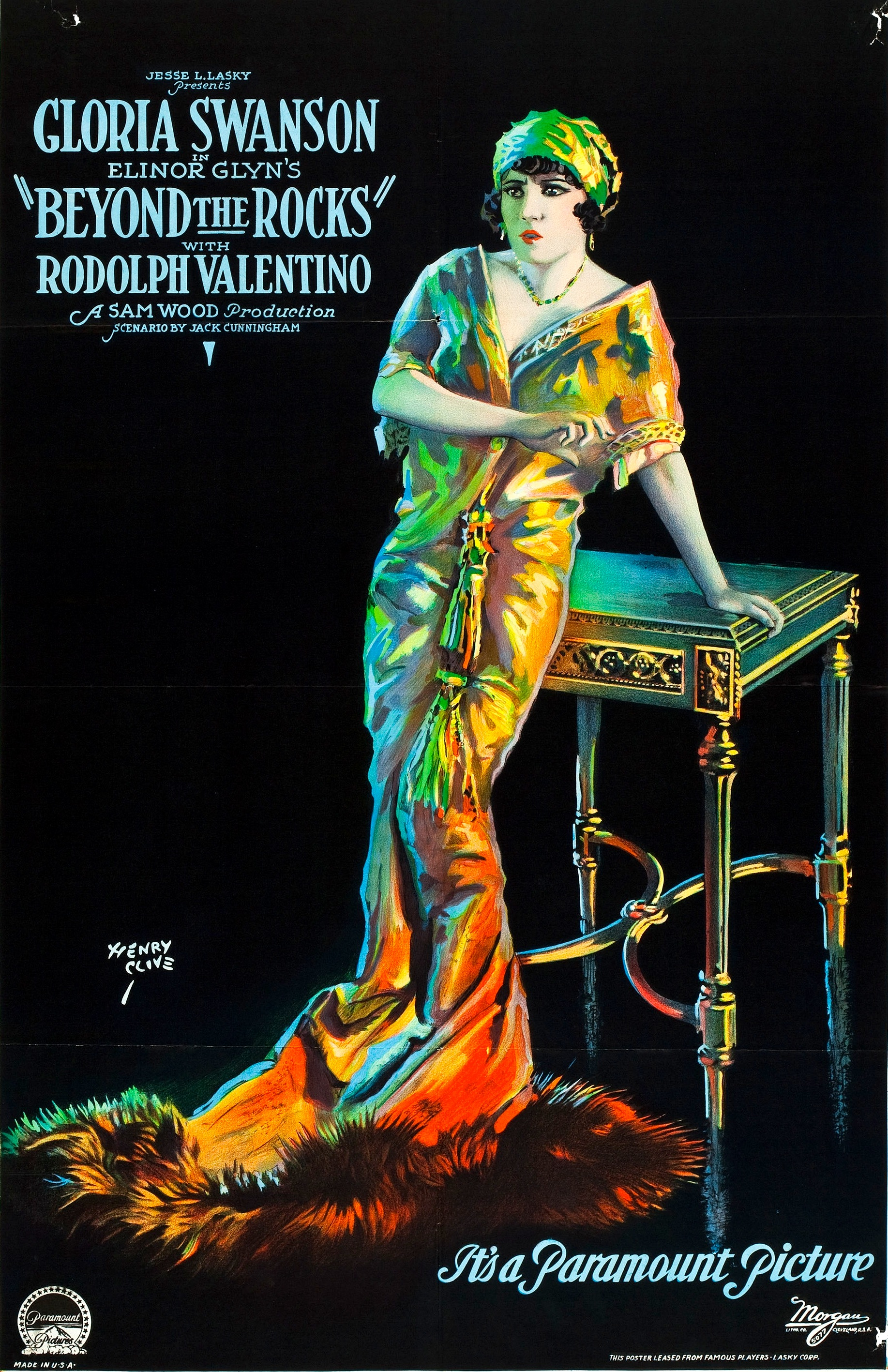
- Poster for the film.
- Directed by: Sam Wood
- Written by: Jack Cunningham (scenario)
- Based on: Beyond the Rocks: A Love Story by Elinor Glyn
- Produced by: Jesse L. Lasky
- Starring: Gloria Swanson; Rudolph Valentino
- Cinematography: Alfred Gilks
- Production company: Famous Players–Lasky
- Distributed by: Paramount Pictures
- Release date: May 7, 1922
- Running time: 80 minutes (2005 alternate version); 76 minutes (DVD edition)
- Country: United States
- Language: Silent with English intertitles

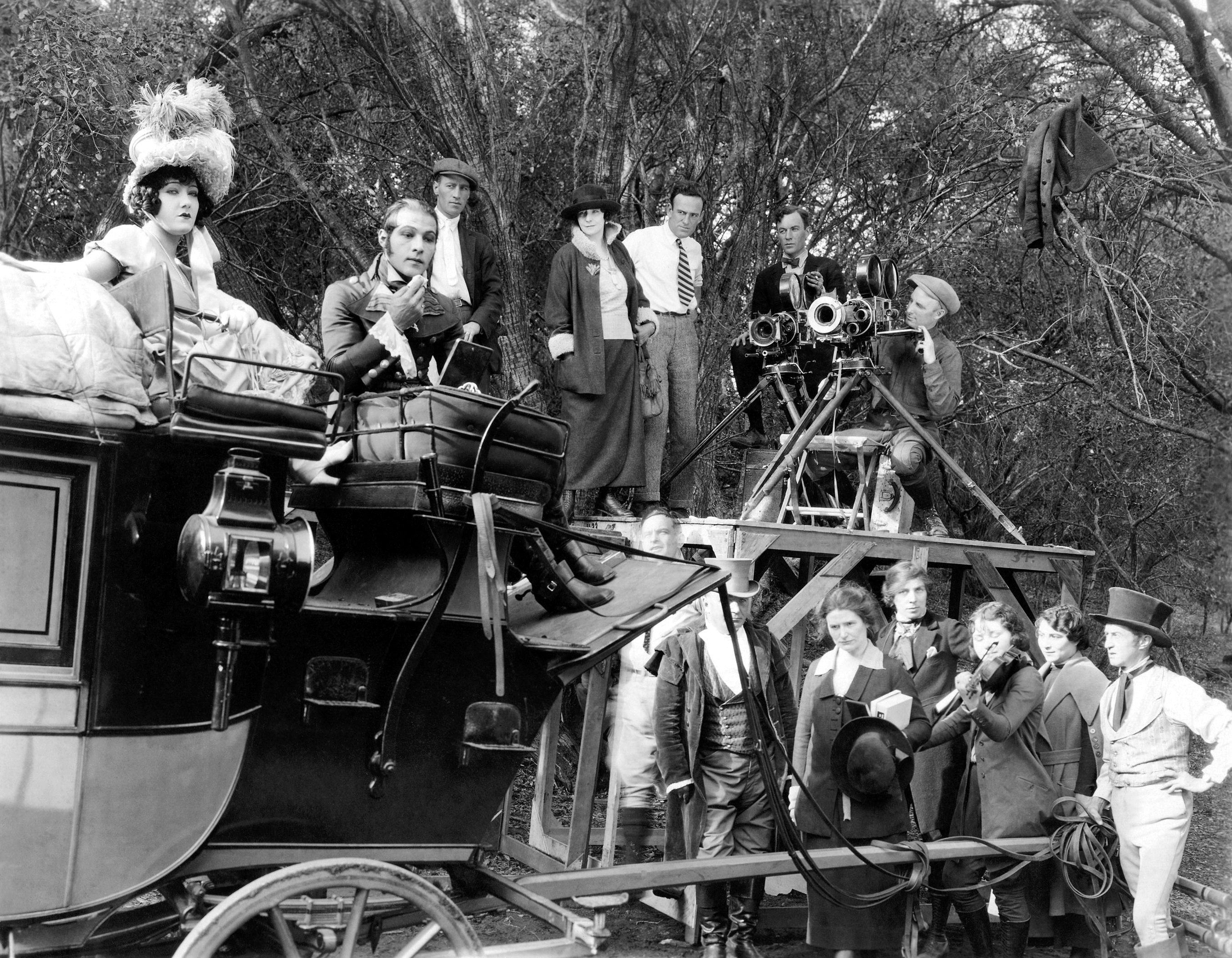
On the set of Beyond the Rocks (1922). Top row, L-R: Gloria Swanson, Rudolph Valentino, unknown, Edythe Chapman, director Sam Wood, Alfred Gilks, Osmond Borradaile (Bottom row) All unknown except Alec B. Francis (far right)

Beyond the Rocks is a 1922 American silent romantic drama film directed by Sam Wood, and starring Gloria Swanson and Rudolph Valentino. It is based on the 1906 novel of the same name by Elinor Glyn. The film was long considered lost but a nitrate print of it was discovered in the Netherlands in 2003. Beyond the Rocks was restored by The Netherlands Filmmuseum in 2005. It was released on DVD by Milestone Film & Video in 2006 and on Eye Film Player, the streaming platform of Eye Filmmuseum, in 2020.

== Plot ==
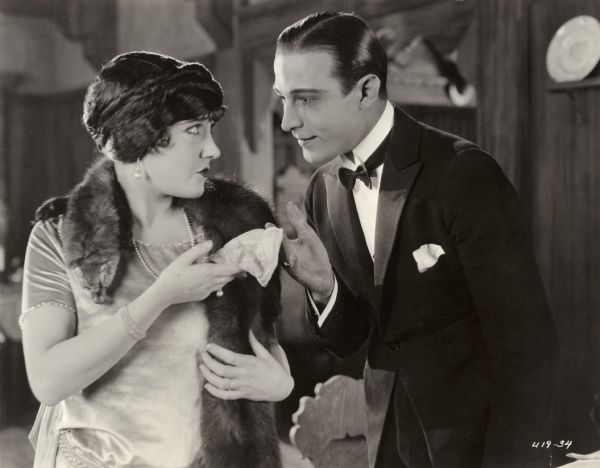
Theodora Fitzgerald (Swanson) looks into the eyes of Lord Hector Bracondale (Valentino) who returns her handkerchief in Beyond the Rocks

Captain Fitzgerald, a retired guardsman on a modest pension, has to support three daughters: Theodora and her older half-sisters. Theodora's sisters pin their hopes on her marrying a wealthy man.

One day, Theodora goes out on a rowboat off the coast of Dorset and falls into the water. She is rescued by Lord Hector Bracondale. He is young, handsome and wealthy, but "not the marrying kind". Out of a sense of duty to her beloved father, she reluctantly agrees to wed the middle-aged, short, stout Josiah Brown, a former grocer's assistant who is now a multi-millionaire.

They honeymoon in the Alps. By coincidence, Bracondale stops at the same inn. Rich American widow Jane McBride persuades the young bride to accompany her on a climbing excursion. Theodora slips and dangles precariously by her safety line over a cliff. Bracondale appears and climbs down to her, but they are too heavy for the others to pull up. Bracondale has them lower him and Theodora to a ledge below. While they wait for more help to arrive, Theodora tells Bracondale (who does not initially recognize her) where they last met.

They meet a third time in Paris, and finally acknowledge their love for each other. However, Theodora refuses to run away with Bracondale.

Bracondale strives to do the right thing. He asks his sister, Lady Anningford, to befriend Theodora. Lady Anningford invites the Browns to her country estate. Bracondale, however, cannot stay away. He tries once again to persuade Theodora to change her mind, without success. Meanwhile, Josiah is persuaded by another guest, renowned explorer Sir Lionel Grey, to fund his dangerous expedition. Bracondale leaves, and Josiah is called away on business. Theodora writes a letter to each; to Bracondale, she declares her love, but stresses once more that it cannot be fulfilled. Morella Winmarleigh, who desires Bracondale for herself, secretly opens the letters and, after perusing them, switches them.

After Bracondale reads the message meant for Josiah, he rushes to stop Josiah from reading his, but is too late. Josiah accuses Bracondale of stealing his wife, but the nobleman denies that Theodora has been unfaithful.

After further consideration, Josiah decides to put his wife's happiness ahead of his own and joins Grey's expedition to Northern Africa. His death makes it possible for the young lovers to be together.

== Cast ==
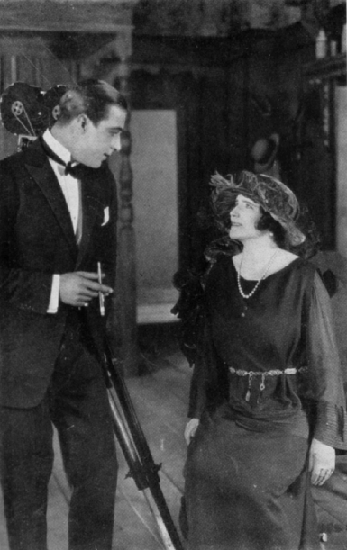
Valentino and Glyn

- Gloria Swanson as Theodora Fitzgerald
- Rudolph Valentino (credited as Rodolph Valentino) as Lord Hector Bracondale
- Edythe Chapman as Lady Bracondale, Hector's mother
- Alec B. Francis as Captain Fitzgerald
- Robert Bolder as Josiah Brown
- Gertrude Astor as Morella Winmarleigh
- June Elvidge as Lady Anna Anningford
- Mabel Van Buren as Jane McBride
- Helen Dunbar as Lady Ada Fitzgerald
- Raymond Brathwayt as Sir Patrick Fitzgerald
- Frank Butler (credited as F. R. Butler) as Lord Wensleydon
- Gino Corrado as Guest at Alpine Inn (uncredited)

== Differences from the book ==
While the book mostly takes place at dinner parties, picnics and balls, the film version changes many of the events to take place during perilous outdoor sports. Relatedly, the book's Bracondale never saves Theodora's life, as there is no particular danger for her to get into. Josiah in the book is chronically ill and dies after a long period of health problems; in the film he dies relatively quickly during an ambush while in Africa. The film also has added historical sequences, inspired by Cecil B. DeMille's work. Director Sam Wood had been an assistant director for DeMille.

== Reception ==
In a review, Photoplay wrote: "Written, supervised, and dominated by the personality of Elinor Glyn. A little unreal and hectic as though the continuous presence of the stars was the desired object. But those who like Valentino and Swnason will not be disappointed. A glynish tale of true love, baronial halls, and the treacherous Alps, with Gloria's makeup whiter than the snow."

== Preservation ==
Beyond the Rocks was considered a lost film. In the last years of her life Gloria Swanson professed a desire to see Beyond the Rocks with a modern audience, as much interest lingered for Valentino, but at the time of her death in 1983 the film (save for a one-minute portion) was still believed lost. In 2003, however, a print was found in the Netherlands among some two thousand rusty film canisters from the private collection of Joop van Liempd of Haarlem, which was deposited at Eye Filmmuseum in 2000; it was restored by the Nederlands Filmmuseum and Haghefilm Laboratories and given its first modern screening in 2005, with a DVD release the following year.

== Gallery ==
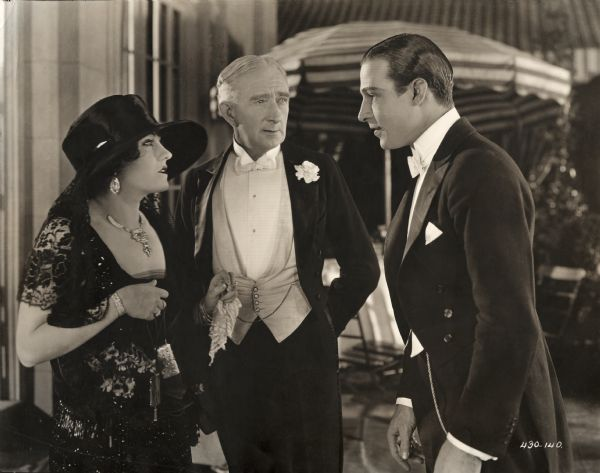
Theodora Fitzgerald and her father Captain Fitzgerald (played by Gloria Swanson and Alec B. Francis) talk to Lord Hector Bracondale (Rudolf Valentino) in Beyond the Rocks

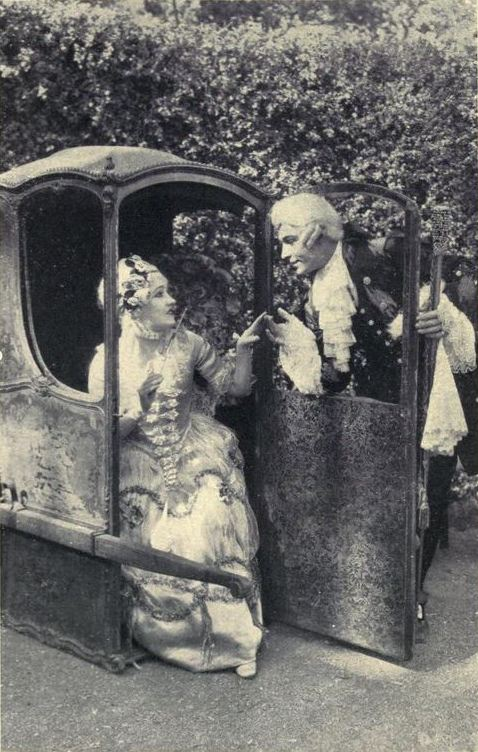
Gloria Swanson and Rudolph Valentino.

== See also ==
- List of rediscovered films
