= Beyond the Rocks =

1906 book by Elinor Glyn

- Author: Elinor Glyn
- Language: English
- Genre: Novel
- Publisher: Duckworth
- Publication date: 1906
- Publication place: United Kingdom
- Media type: Print (hardcover)

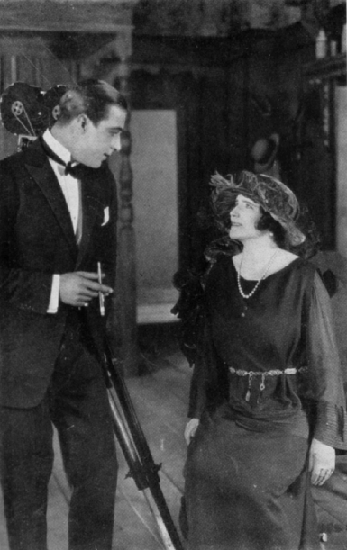
Elinor Glyn looks up at Rudolph Valentino, from the frontispiece of Beyond The Rocks

Beyond the Rocks is a 1906 novel by Elinor Glyn. The novel was later adapted into a 1922 silent film in which Gloria Swanson and Rudolph Valentino (credited as Rodolph Valentino) starred together for the only time. The film was directed by Sam Wood and distributed by Paramount Pictures.

The novel's title comes from a conversation in Chapter 4 about the nature of Fate, where the main character expresses belief that "if one does one's best some kind angel will guide one's bark [on the river of life] past the rocks and safely into the smooth waters of the pool beyond." Frequently thereafter, the characters long for angels who will steer them "beyond the rocks."

== Plot ==
The beautiful young Theodora Fitzgerald belongs to a family of noble lineage whose fortunes have waned and who have lived in near poverty for most of her life. The book begins with her arranged marriage to Josiah Brown, a nouveau-riche Australian in his fifties. The marriage was contracted for convenience: Josiah simply wants a pretty and aristocratic wife to improve his standing in society, and the Fitzgerald family are in need of Brown's financial resources. Theodora only agrees to the marriage for the sake of her father and sisters.

Immediately after the wedding, Josiah falls ill. Theodora proves a dutiful and capable wife, and attends to her husband's every need, though she is secretly very unhappy. After a year of marriage, Josiah is well enough to visit Paris, where Theodora sees her father, Dominic, again for the first time since her wedding. She is thrilled to observe that at least he is receiving all the benefits she'd hoped to bring from her sacrifice: he now runs in aristocratic circles and is courting a wealthy American widow, Mrs. McBride. Theodora attends several social outings with her father, and at one dinner is introduced to Hector, Lord Bracondale. Theodora and Hector hit things off splendidly, and soon fall in love. Mrs. McBride is aware of Theodora's unhappy marriage, and seeing the situation she sympathetically arranges for Hector and Theodora to spend time together as often as possible. One day while Theodora and Hector are being chauffeured back to Paris after an outing at Versailles, the two indulge in a romantic encounter in the back of the car. Full of guilt thereafter, the two conclude they must behave themselves from now on and must no longer pursue each other romantically; they will, however, continue to be friendly to one another any time future social obligations might cause them to meet.

Hector at this point is terribly in love with Theodora, and though he tries his best to live by his promise to her, he still goes out of his way to see her and to secure invitations to all the same gatherings that she attends. He fantasizes about marrying her and makes sure to introduce her to his mother and to his sister. However, Theodora's status as a newcomer into society, and the obvious favour that Hector pays her over other eligible women who desire his hand, causes ire and jealousy to be directed her way. Rumors begin to spread, and several people believe Hector and Theodora to be lovers. Morella Winmarleigh, a spurned candidate for Hector's hand, particularly sets out destroy Theodora. She maliciously switches a letter Theodora had written to Hector with another letter meant for Josiah. Meanwhile, without anyone else's knowledge, Theodora and Hector have concluded that they cannot attempt to remain friends any longer—their love is too strong—and so they must agree to never see each other again.

The next day, Josiah receives Theodora's letter meant for Hector: the contents amount to Theodora asking Hector never to see her again, even though the two of them could be very happy together, because it is her duty to instead attend to the happiness of her husband Josiah. Josiah realises for the first time how he has stood in the way of Theodora's happiness, and resolves to do his best to make her happy from now on. He forwards the letter to Hector and requests he never allow Theodora to learn of the mix-up. The next several months pass with Theodora and Josiah both trying their best to make the other happy, even while both are secretly miserable. Both begin to suffer from ill health. Ultimately, Josiah dies; eighteen months later, Mrs. McBride (now married to Dominic Fitzgerald) throws a picnic at Versailles to which both Theodora and Hector are invited. The book ends with the couple reunited, in a state of "passionate love and delirious happiness."

== Publicity ==
The novel was republished in 1922 in an edition by The Macaulay Company which included "illustrations from the Paramount Photo-Play" of Valentino and Swanson.

Publicity at the time described the film as:

A flaming romance as only the author of Three Weeks could write it; as only Gloria Swanson, with dashing Rodolph Valentino playing the lover, could make it live in all its ardent splendor.

The story of a passionate young heart bound by society's conventions, struggling and risking all for sadness:

— of gay nights of revelry in the Parisian world of fashion.
— of intrigue and coquetry in the gilded resorts of London high society.

Never before have such dramatic love scenes, such spectacular adventure been placed before the public. The love-drama with all the thrills and luxury of a lifetime! The one book and picture you'll never forget!
