= Elinor Glyn =

British novelist and scriptwriter (1864–1943)

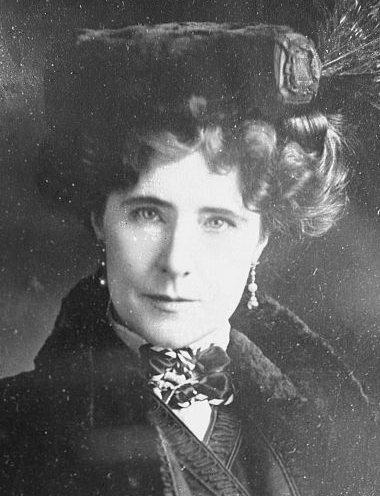
- Elinor Glyn, United States
- Born: Elinor Sutherland; 17 October 1864; Jersey, Channel Islands, United Kingdom of Great Britain and Ireland
- Died: 23 September 1943 (aged 78); Chelsea, London, England, United Kingdom
- Occupations: Novelist and scriptwriter
- Spouse: Clayton Louis Glyn (m. 1892; died 1915)
- Children: 2, including Juliet
- Relatives: Lucy, Lady Duff-Gordon (sister); Sir Edward Rae Davson, 1st Baronet (son-in-law); Sir Rhys Rhys-Williams, 1st Baronet (son-in-law); Sir Brandon Rhys-Williams, 2nd Baronet (grandson)
- Writing career
- Pen name: Elinor Glyn
- Language: English
- Period: 1900–1940
- Genre: Romance fiction
- Notable works: Beyond the Rocks, Three Weeks, The Visits of Elizabeth
- Movement: Modernism

Elinor Glyn (née Sutherland; 17 October 1864 – 23 September 1943) was a British novelist and scriptwriter who specialised in romantic fiction, which was considered scandalous for its time, although her works are relatively tame by modern standards. She popularized the concept of the "it girl", and had tremendous influence on early 20th-century popular culture and, possibly, on the careers of notable Hollywood stars such as Rudolph Valentino, Gloria Swanson and, especially, Clara Bow.

== Early life and family background ==
Elinor Sutherland was born on 17 October 1864 in Saint Helier, Jersey, in the Channel Islands. She was the younger daughter of Douglas Sutherland (1838–1865), a civil engineer of Scottish descent, and his wife Elinor Saunders (1841–1937), of an Anglo-French family that had settled in Canada. Her father was said to be related to the Lords Duffus. (Note: The Sutherlands were descended from David Sutherland, Laird of Cambusavie, allegedly a son of Alexander Sutherland, a younger brother of the Jacobite 3rd Lord Duffus, who is described in The Scots Peerage as having died without issue. The fact that the 6th Lord Duffus inherited in 1827 over the now Canadian Sutherlands, who sold their estates in the 1770s to the Earl of Sutherland, probably means that the relationship was more distant, or if the same, that the Laird of Cambusavie was illegitimate.)

Her father died when she was two months old; her mother returned to the parental home in Guelph, in what was then Upper Canada, British North America (now Ontario) with her two daughters. Here, young Elinor was taught by her grandmother, Lucy Anne Saunders (née Willcocks), daughter of Sir Richard Willcocks, a magistrate in the early Irish police force, who helped to suppress the Emmet Rising in 1803. Richard's brother Joseph also settled in Upper Canada, publishing one of the first opposition papers there, pursuing liberty, and dying a rebel in 1814. The Anglo-Irish grandmother instructed young Elinor in the ways of upper-class society. This training not only gave her an entrée into aristocratic circles on her return to Europe, it also led to her reputation as an authority on style and breeding when she worked in Hollywood in the 1920s. Her grandfather on her mother's side, Thomas Saunders (1795–1873) was a direct descendant of the Saunders family who had possessed Pitchcott Manor in Buckinghamshire for several centuries.

The family lived in Guelph for seven years at a stone home that still stands near the University of Guelph. Glyn's mother remarried in 1871 to David Kennedy, and the family returned to Jersey when Glyn was about eight years old. Her subsequent education at her stepfather's house was by governesses. Glyn's elder sister grew up to be Lucy, Lady Duff-Gordon, famous as a fashion designer under the name Lucile.

== Life and career ==
Elinor married on 27 April 1892, at the age of 28. Her husband was Clayton Louis Glyn (13 July 1857 – 10 November 1915), a wealthy but spendthrift barrister and Essex landowner who was descended from Sir Richard Carr Glyn, an 18th-century Lord Mayor of London. The couple had two daughters, Margot and Juliet, but the marriage foundered on mutual incompatibility.

Glyn began writing in 1900, starting with Visits of Elizabeth, serialised in The World, a book based on letters to her mother, although Lady Angela Forbes claimed, in her memoirs, that Glyn used her as the prototype of Elizabeth. As Glyn's husband fell into debt from around 1908, she wrote at least one novel a year to keep up her standard of living.

Her marriage was troubled, and Glyn began having affairs with various British aristocrats. Her novel Three Weeks, about a Balkan queen who seduces a young British aristocrat, was allegedly inspired by her affair with Lord Alistair Innes Ker, brother of the Duke of Roxburghe, sixteen years her junior, which scandalized Edwardian society.

Around 1907, Glyn toured the United States, resulting in her book Elizabeth visits America (1909).

Glyn had a long affair between circa 1907 and 1916 with Lord Curzon, the former Viceroy of India. (Note: Their affair lasted eight-years and collapsed circa 1915–16.) Society painter Philip de László painted her in 1912, when she was 48. Curzon is presumed to have commissioned it and had given Glyn the sapphires she wears in the portrait. (Note: The painting is reportedly still owned by her family.) In 1915, Curzon leased Montacute House, in South Somerset, for him and Glyn, now a widow as her husband had died that autumn at the age of 58 after several years of illness. Curzon asked Glyn to decorate Montacute House and with Glyn away from London, Curzon courted heiress Grace Duggan. Glyn learned of Curzon and Duggan's engagement from the morning papers and burnt 500 love letters in the bedroom fireplace, never speaking to Curzon again.

Glyn pioneered risqué, and sometimes erotic, romantic fiction aimed at a female readership, a radical idea for its time. In her novel The Man and the Moment (1914), she coined the use of the word it to mean a characteristic that "draws all others with magnetic force. With 'IT' you win all men if you are a woman–and all women if you are a man. 'IT' can be a quality of the mind as well as a physical attraction." Her use of the word is often erroneously taken to simply be a euphemism for sexuality or sex appeal.

During World War I, Glyn became a war correspondent, working in France. At the signing of the Treaty of Versailles, 28 June 1919, Glyn was one of only two women present.

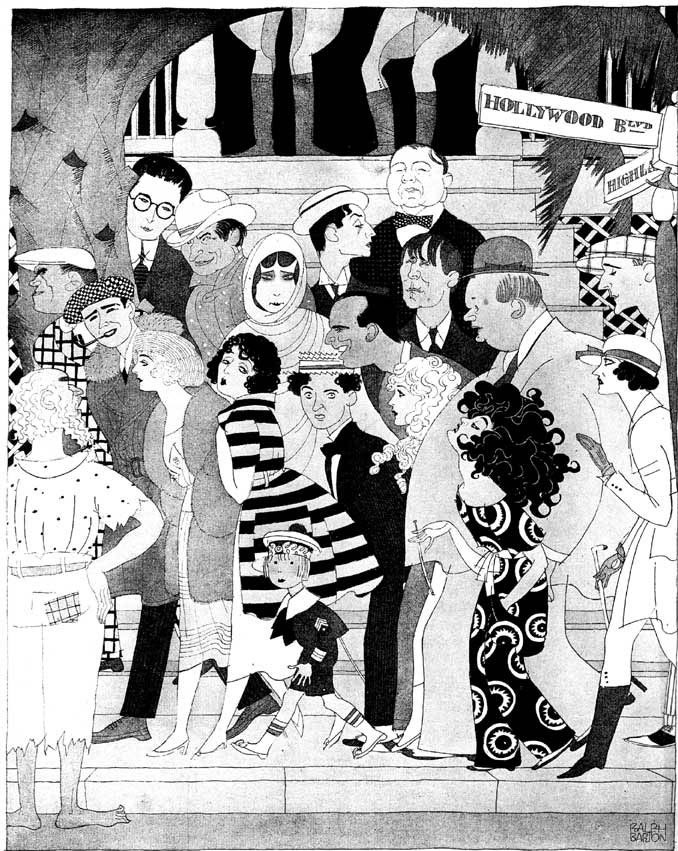
This 1922 Vanity Fair caricature by Ralph Barton shows the famous people who, he imagined, left work each day in Hollywood; use cursor to identify individual figures.

After the war, Glyn went to Hollywood, for the filming of her novel The Great Moment. In 1919, she signed a contract with William Randolph Hearst's International Magazine Company to write stories and articles that included a clause for the motion picture rights. She was brought over from England to write screenplays by the Famous Players–Lasky production company. She wrote for Cosmopolitan and other Hearst press titles, advising women on how to keep their men and imparting health and beauty tips. The Elinor Glyn System of Writing (1922) gives insights into writing for Hollywood studios and magazine editors of the time.

Glyn was one of the most famous women screenwriters in the 1920s. She has 28 story or screenwriting credits, three producing credits, and two credits for directing. Her first script was called The Great Moment and starred Gloria Swanson.

Glyn was responsible for many screenplays in the 1920s, including Six Hours (1923) and the film version of her novel Three Weeks (1924). Other films she wrote were His Hour (1924), directed by King Vidor; Love's Blindness (1926), about a marriage that is done strictly for financial reasons; Man and Maid (1925), about a man who must choose between two women; The Only Thing (1925); and Ritzy (1927). Three screenplays based on Glyn's novels and a story in the mid to late twenties, Man and Maid, The Only Thing, and Ritzy, did not do well at the box office, despite the success Glyn gained with her first project, The Great Moment, which was in the same genre. In 1929 she wrote her first non-silent film, Such Men Are Dangerous, her last film writing in the United States.

Apart from being a scriptwriter for the silent movie industry, working for both MGM and Paramount Pictures in Hollywood in the mid-1920s, she had a brief career as one of the earliest female directors. In addition to being credited as an author, adapter, and co-producer on the 1927 film adaptation of It, she also made a cameo appearance.

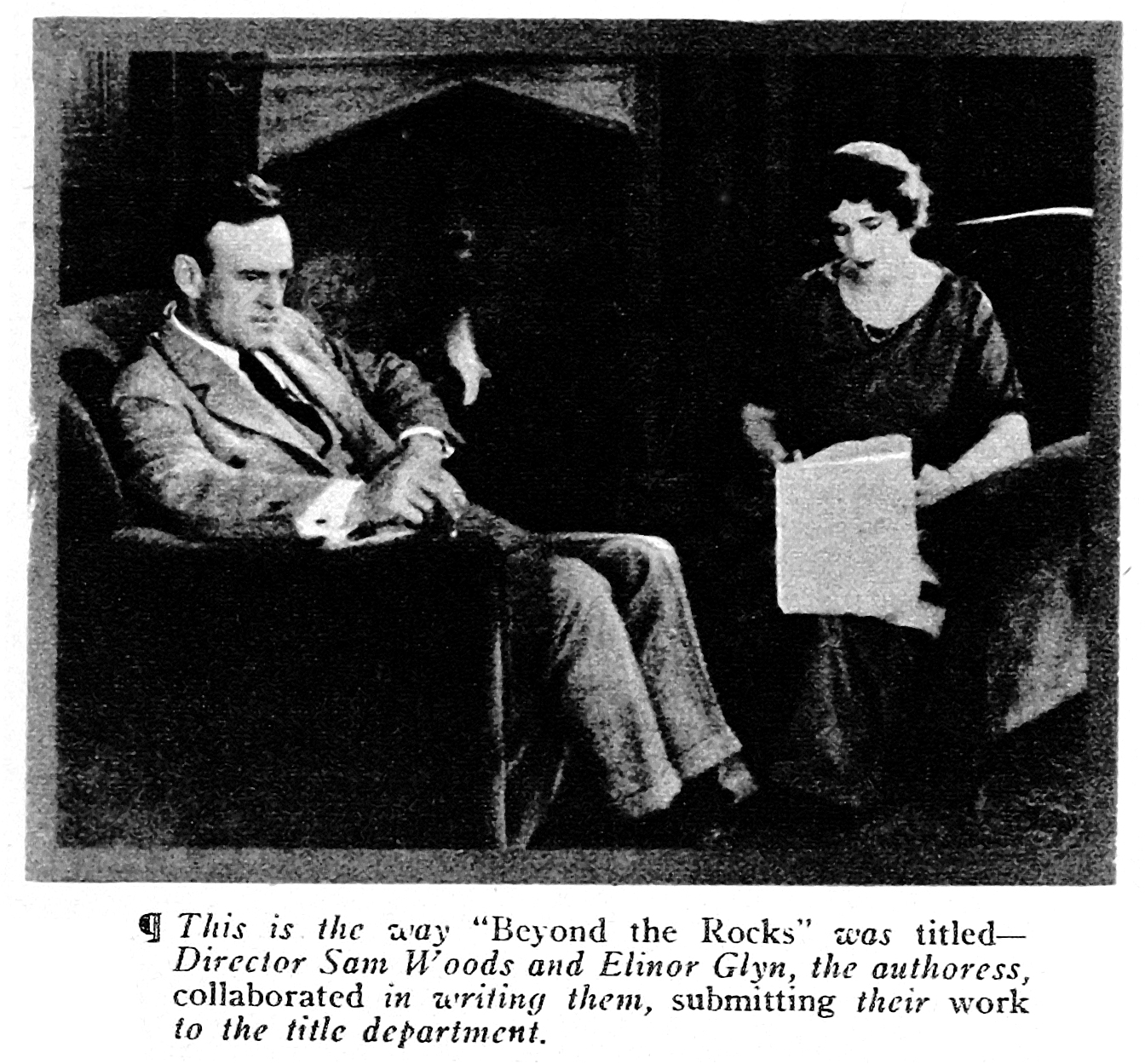
Publicity photo of Sam Woods and Elinor Glyn writing the titles for the film “Beyond the Rocks”

Glyn is credited with the re-styling of Gloria Swanson from giggly starlet to elegant star. The duo connected again when Beyond the Rocks was made into a silent film that was released in 1922. The Sam Wood–directed film stars Swanson and Rudolph Valentino as a romantic pair. In 1927, Glyn helped to make a star of actress Clara Bow, for whom she coined the sobriquet "the It girl." In 1928, Bow also starred in Red Hair, which was based on Glyn's 1905 novel of the same name. The film was a comedy vehicle to demonstrate the supposed passion of red-haired people.

Glyn returned home to England in 1929 in part because of tax demands. With her return she set out to form her own production company, Elinor Glyn Ltd. Her family had established a company in 1924, Elinor Glyn Ltd, to which she signed her copyrights, receiving an income from the firm and an annuity in later life. The firm was an early pioneer of cross-media branding. After she started the company, she began working as a film director as well. Paying out of her own pocket, she directed Knowing Men in 1930, which showed a more traditionalist view of men as sexual harassers. The project was a disaster, and the screenwriter Edward Knoblock sued Glyn so that the work could not be released. Elinor Glyn Ltd produced a second film in 1930, The Price of Things, which was also unsuccessful and was never released in the US. As her company failed and she exhausted her finances, Glyn decided to retire from film work and instead focus on her first passion, writing novels.

== Death ==
After a short illness, Glyn died on 23 September 1943, at 39 Royal Avenue, Chelsea, London, aged 78, and was cremated at Golders Green Crematorium. Her ashes lie above the door to the Jewish Shrine at the west end of the columbarium.

== Descendants ==
- Margot Elinor Glyn, later Margot, Lady Davson OBE (June 1893 – 10 September 1966 in Rome); she married Sir Edward Rae Davson, 1st Baronet (14 September 1875 – 9 August 1937) in 1921 and had two sons:
  - Anthony Glyn (13 March 1922 – 20 January 1998), author, previously Sir Geoffrey Leo Simon Davson, 2nd Baronet. He was born Geoffrey Leo Simon Davson, but he changed his name to Anthony Geoffrey Ian Simon Glyn by deed poll in 1957. In 1937, at the age of 15, he inherited his father's baronetcy (created in 1927) and became known as Sir Geoffrey Davson, 2nd Baronet. He was a prolific writer and in 1955 he published an entertaining if tactful biography of his maternal grandmother, Elinor Glyn. In 1946, he married his first cousin, Susan Rhys-Williams, daughter of Sir Rhys Rhys-Williams Bt. They had two daughters, Victoria and Caroline. The baronetcy thus passed to his younger brother, Christopher Davson.
    - Victoria
    - Caroline Glyn (née Davson) (27 August 1947 – 15 May 1981), novelist, poet, and artist. Her first novel, Don't Knock the Corners Off, was published in 1963 when she was 15. At the age of 20, she became a contemplative nun with the enclosed order of Poor Clares at Community of St. Clare, Freeland, Oxfordshire, later helping to found a new monastery in Stroud, New South Wales, Australia. In the convent she continued to publish and to create artworks.
  - Sir Christopher Michael Edward Davson, 3rd Baronet (1927–2004)
    - Sir George Trenchard Simon Davson, 4th Baronet (born 1964)
- Juliet Evangeline Glyn, later Dame Juliet Rhys-Williams DBE (1898–1964), who was a governor of the BBC from 1952 to 1956. She married (24 February 1921) the much older Liberal politician Sir Rhys Rhys-Williams Bt (20 October 1865 – 29 January 1955, aged 89), MP for Banbury 1918–22, and they had two sons and two daughters. Both husband and wife abandoned the Liberal Party for the Conservative Party.
  - Sir Brandon Rhys-Williams, 2nd Baronet (14 November 1927 – 18 May 1988), MP for Kensington South 1968–74, then for Kensington 1974–88, also MEP 1973–84. By his wife Caroline Susan Foster, he had the following children, including:
    - Sir (Arthur) Gareth Ludovic Emrys Rhys-Williams, 3rd Baronet (born 1961)
  - Glyn Rhys-Williams, Capt Welsh Guards, died (9 April 1943) at Fondouk, Tunisia aged 21.
  - Susan Rhys-Williams, who married her cousin Anthony Glyn (above) and became Lady Glyn. A former barrister, she was a poet and artist. Died 2024 aged 100.
  - Elspeth Rhys-Williams, later Chowdhary-Best.

== References in popular culture ==
- A scene in Glyn's most sensational work, Three Weeks, inspired the doggerel:

Would you like to sin
With Elinor Glyn
On a tiger skin?
Or would you prefer
To err with her
On some other fur?

- In his autobiography, Mark Twain describes the time he met Glyn, when they had a wide-ranging and frank discussion of "nature's laws" and other matters not "to be repeated," which Glyn published.
- She occasionally cited herself in the third person in her own books, as in Man and Maid (1922), when she has a character refer to "that 'It'" as something "Elinor Glyn writes of in her books".
- In the 1923 film The Ten Commandments, one title card says: "Nobody believes in these Commandment things nowadays—and I think Elinor Glyn's a lot more interesting."
- In the 1925 film Stella Dallas, at around 1 hour and 2 minutes into the film, the following title appears: "For a woman with all her money she's got rotten taste in books. And me dying for Elinor Glyn's latest!"
- In S. J. Perelman's series of pieces Cloudland Revisited, as a middle-aged man, he re-reads and describes the risqué novels that had thrilled him as a youth. The essay "Tuberoses and Tigers" deals with Glyn's Three Weeks. Perelman described it as "servant-girl literature", and called Glyn's style "marshmallow". He also mentions a film version of the book made by Samuel Goldwyn in 1924, in which Aileen Pringle starred. Perelman recalled Goldwyn's "seductive" image of Pringle "lolling on a tiger skin."
- The Sigmund Romberg comic song "It" with lyrics by Edward Smith is featured in his popular operetta The Desert Song (1926).
- Glyn is also mentioned in a 1927 Lorenz Hart song "My Heart Stood Still," from One Damn Thing After Another:

I read my Plato
Love, I thought a sin
But since your kiss
I'm reading missus Glyn!

- She made cameo appearances as herself in the 1927 film It and in the 1928 film Show People.
- Dorothy L. Sayers' writes in her novel Unnatural Death (1927 "Never had he met a woman in whom 'the great "It"', eloquently hymned by Mrs Elinor Glyn, was so completely lacking."
- In Evelyn Waugh's 1952 novel Men at Arms (the first of the Sword of Honour trilogy), an (RAF) Air Marshal recites the poem (above) upon spotting a polar bear rug by the fire in a London club, of which he has just wangled membership (p. 125). To this, another member responds, "Who the hell is Elinor Glyn?" The Air Marshal replies, "Oh, just a name, you know, put in to make it rhyme." This was both a snub to the Air Marshal and a literary snubbing of Glyn by Waugh.
- In Stanley Donen's 1954 biopic about Romberg, Deep in My Heart, the musical number "It" from the Artists and Models (revue) segment features dancer Ann Miller singing about Elinor Glyn and Sigmund Freud.
- In the 1962 film version of Meredith Willson's musical The Music Man, Marian Paroo the librarian asks the prudish Mrs. Shinn, the mayor's wife, if she would not rather have her daughter reading the classic Persian poetry of Omar Khayyam than Elinor Glyn, to which Mrs Shinn replies: "What Elinor Glyn reads is her mother's problem!"
- In Upstairs, Downstairs, after Elizabeth Bellamy's disastrous marriage, she meets a new lover, the social-climber Julius Karekin. After a passionate night, he sleeps while she reads part of Chapter XI of Three Weeks aloud.
- In the 1978 film Death on the Nile, the character, novelist Salomé Otterbourne played by Angela Lansbury, is based on Elinor Glyn
- In the 2001 film The Cat's Meow, Elinor Glyn, played by Joanna Lumley, is one of the guests aboard William Randolph Hearst's yacht on the fateful weekend Thomas Ince died. Lumley, as Glyn, provides voice-over narration at the beginning and end of the film.
- In season five, episode three of Downton Abbey (set in 1924), the character Tom Branson refers to the scandalous nature of Elinor Glyn's novels.
- In Chapter 2 of The Women by Hilton Als (1996), which discusses Dorothy Dean, Als juxtaposes Dean with Glyn. Als writes, "This perceived antagonism with heterosexual men provided Dean with the resistance she needed to argue against her conventional fantasy of being someone's girlfriend, someone's Lady Glyn."

== Selected writings ==
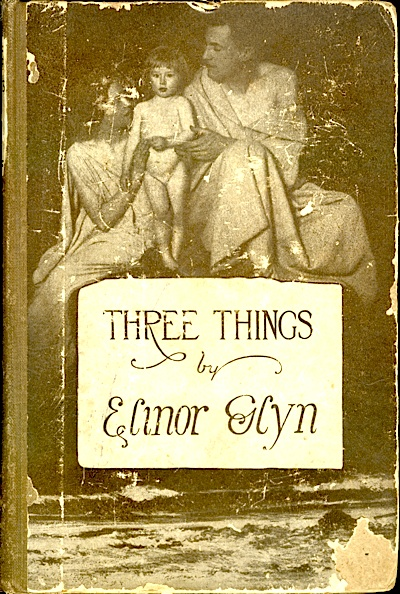
Cover of the 1915 edition of Three Things

Elizabeth series

1. The Visits of Elizabeth (1900)
2. Elizabeth Visits America (1909)

Three Weeks series

1. Three Weeks (1907)
2. One Day (1909) (unauthorized sequel by an anonymous author)
3. High Noon (1910) (unauthorized sequel by an anonymous author)

The Price of Things series

1. The Price of Things (1919), a.k.a. Family
2. Glorious Flames (1932)

Single novels

- The Reflections of Ambrosine (1902), a.k.a. The Seventh Commandment
- The Damsel and the Sage (1903)
- The Vicissitudes of Evangeline (1905), a.k.a. Red Hair
- Beyond the Rocks (1906)
- When the Hour Came (1910), a.k.a. His Hour, a.k.a. When His Hour Came
- The Reason Why (1911)
- Halcyone (1912) a.k.a. Love Itself
- The Sequence (1913) a.k.a. Guinevere's Lover
- The Point of View (1913)
- The Man and the Moment (1914)
- Letters to Caroline (1914) a.k.a. Your Affectionate Godmother
- The Career of Katherine Bush (1916)
- Man and Maid (1922)
- The Great Moment (1923)
- Six Days (1924)
- Love's Blindness (1926)
- Knowing Men (1930)
- The Flirt and the Flapper (1930)
- Love's Hour (1932)
- Sooner or Later (1933)
- Did She? (1934)
- The Third Eye (1940)

Story collections

- The Contrast and Other Stories (1913)
- "It" and Other Stories (1927)
- Saint or Satyr? and Other Stories (1933) as Such Men Are Dangerous

Non-fiction

- The Sayings of Grandmamma and Others (1908)
- Three Things (1915)
- Destruction (1918)
- The Elinor Glyn System of Writing volumes 1,2,3,4 (1922)
- The Philosophy of Love (1923), a.k.a. Love – what I think of It
- Letters from Spain (1924)
- This Passion Called Love (1925)
- The Wrinkle Book, Or, How to Keep Looking Young (1927), a.k.a. Eternal Youth
- The Flirt and the Flapper (1930)
- Romantic Adventure. Being the Autobiography of Elinor Glyn (1936)

== Filmography ==
- Three Weeks, directed by Perry N. Vekroff (1914, based on the novel Three Weeks)
- One Day, directed by Hal Clarendon (1916, based on the novel One Day)
- One Hour, directed by Edwin L. Hollywood and Paul McAllister (1917, sequel to the novel Three Weeks)
- Három het, directed by Márton Garas (Hungary, 1917, based on the novel Three Weeks)
- The Reason Why, directed by Robert G. Vignola (1918, based on the novel The Reason Why)
- The Man and the Moment, directed by Arrigo Bocchi (UK, 1918, based on the novel The Man and the Moment)
- A Sphynx, directed by Béla Balogh (Hungary, 1918, based on the novel When the Hour Came)
- The Career of Katherine Bush, directed by Roy William Neill (1919, based on the novel The Career of Katherine Bush)
- Halcyone, directed by Alfréd Deésy (Hungary, 1919, based on the novel Halcyone)
- Érdekházasság, directed by Antal Forgács (Hungary, 1919, based on the novel The Reason Why)
- Beyond the Rocks, directed by Sam Wood (1922, based on the novel Beyond the Rocks)
- Six Days, directed by Charles Brabin (1923, based on the novel Six Days)
- Three Weeks, directed by Alan Crosland (1924, based on the novel Three Weeks)
- His Hour, directed by King Vidor (1924, based on the novel When the Hour Came)
- Man and Maid, directed by Victor Schertzinger (1925, based on the novel Man and Maid)
- Soul Mates, directed by Jack Conway (1925, based on the novel The Reason Why)
- Love's Blindness, directed by John Francis Dillon (1926, based on the novel Love's Blindness)
- It, directed by Clarence G. Badger (1927, based on the novella It)
- Mad Hour, directed by Joseph Boyle (1928, based on the novel The Man and the Moment)
- Red Hair, directed by Clarence G. Badger (1928, based on the novel The Vicissitudes of Evangeline)
- The Man and the Moment, directed by George Fitzmaurice (1929, based on the novel The Man and the Moment)
- Knowing Men, directed by Elinor Glyn (UK, 1930, based on the novel Knowing Men)
- The Price of Things, directed by Elinor Glyn (UK, 1930, based on the novel The Price of Things)

=== Screenwriter ===
- 1921: The Great Moment (dir. Sam Wood)
- 1922: The World's a Stage (dir. Colin Campbell)
- 1924: How to Educate a Wife (dir. Monta Bell)
- 1925: The Only Thing (dir. Jack Conway)
- 1927: Ritzy (dir. Richard Rosson)
- 1928: Three Weekends (dir. Clarence G. Badger)
- 1930: Such Men Are Dangerous (dir. Kenneth Hawks)

=== Director ===
- Knowing Men (UK, 1930)
- The Price of Things (UK, 1930)
