= Frank Butler (writer) =

American actor

- Frank Butler, next to actress Mary Land, in the 1922 film My American Wife.
- Born: Frank Russell Butler; December 28, 1889; Oxford, Oxfordshire, England
- Died: June 10, 1967 (aged 76); Oceanside, California, US.
- Occupations: Actor, screenwriter
- Years active: 1920–1959
- Spouses: Margaret Annie Dansey Addis (m. 1912, divorced) Helen Lue Huntoon (m. 1921; div. 1926) Ethel Virginia Chapman (m. 1927)

Frank Russell Butler (December 28, 1889 – June 10, 1967) was an English-born American film and theatre actor and screenwriter. He won an Academy Award for Best Original Screenplay in 1944 for Going My Way.

== Early life ==
Butler was born in Oxford, Oxfordshire, England, to parents Frederick Butler and Sarah Ann Hedges.

== Career ==
=== Theatre ===
His theatre career included two appearances (1920s–1930s) in Broadway-theatre productions in New York City.

=== Film work ===
Butler's film career started with silent films in the early 1920s. He appeared in almost fifty films and wrote more than sixty screenplays. This included the 1937 film Champagne Waltz.

Herbert Coleman wrote Butler "was known around Paramount as the Story Doctor. He was one of the studio’s most valuable executives. Although Butler was third in pecking order in the story department, after D. A. Doran and Frank Cleaver, his gifted talents touched almost every screenplay that found its way to his desk. And almost every script did, on direct orders from Barney Balaban, president of Paramount."

== Personal life ==
Butler was married three times: first to Margaret Annie Dansey Addis in 1912, which ended in divorce; then Helen Lue Huntoon in 1921, divorced in 1926; and last Virginia Chapman in 1927. His son, Hugo Butler, also became a Hollywood screenwriter.

=== Awards ===
Butler co-won, with Frank Cavett, the Academy Award for Best Original Screenplay for the film Going My Way (1944). Butler had earlier been nominated for an Academy Award for Best Writing (Original Screenplay) twice in the same year, for Road to Morocco and Wake Island, both released in 1942.

== Partial filmography ==
- Behold My Wife! (1920) (acted)
- The Great Moment (1921) (acted)
- The Sheik (1921) (acted)
- Beyond the Rocks (1922) (acted)
- A Tailor-Made Man (1922) (acted)
- My American Wife (1922) (acted)
- The Tiger's Claw (1923) (acted)
- The Call of the Wild (1923) (acted)
- Satan in Sables (1925) (acted)
- Made for Love (1926) (acted)
- 30 Below Zero (1926)
- The Honorable Mr. Buggs (1927)
- Flying Elephants (1928) (directed)
- The Big Killing (1928)
- Just Married (1928)
- China Bound (1929)
- Untamed (1929)
- Strictly Unconventional (1930)
- Those Three French Girls (1930)
- Remote Control (1930)
- New Moon (1930)
- This Modern Age (1931)
- When a Feller Needs a Friend (1932)
- College Humor (1933)
- Search for Beauty (1934)
- Babes in Toyland (1934)
- Vagabond Lady (1935)
- Coronado (1935)
- Strike Me Pink (1936)
- The Milky Way (1936)
- The Bohemian Girl (1936)
- The Princess Comes Across (1936)
- Champagne Waltz (1937)
- Waikiki Wedding (1937)
- Paris Honeymoon (1939)
- Never Say Die (1939)
- The Star Maker (1939)
- Road to Singapore (1940)
- I Want a Divorce (1940)
- Rangers of Fortune (1940)
- Road to Zanzibar (1941)
- Aloma of the South Seas (1941)
- My Favorite Blonde (1942)
- Beyond the Blue Horizon (1942)
- Wake Island (1942)
- Road to Morocco (1942)
- Hostages (1943)
- Going My Way (1944)
- A Medal for Benny (1945)
- Incendiary Blonde (1945)
- California (1947)
- Welcome Stranger (1947)
- The Perils of Pauline (1947)
- Golden Earrings (1947)
- Whispering Smith (1948)
- Road to Bali (1952)
- Strange Lady in Town (1955)
