= The Great Moment (1921 film) =

American silent drama film

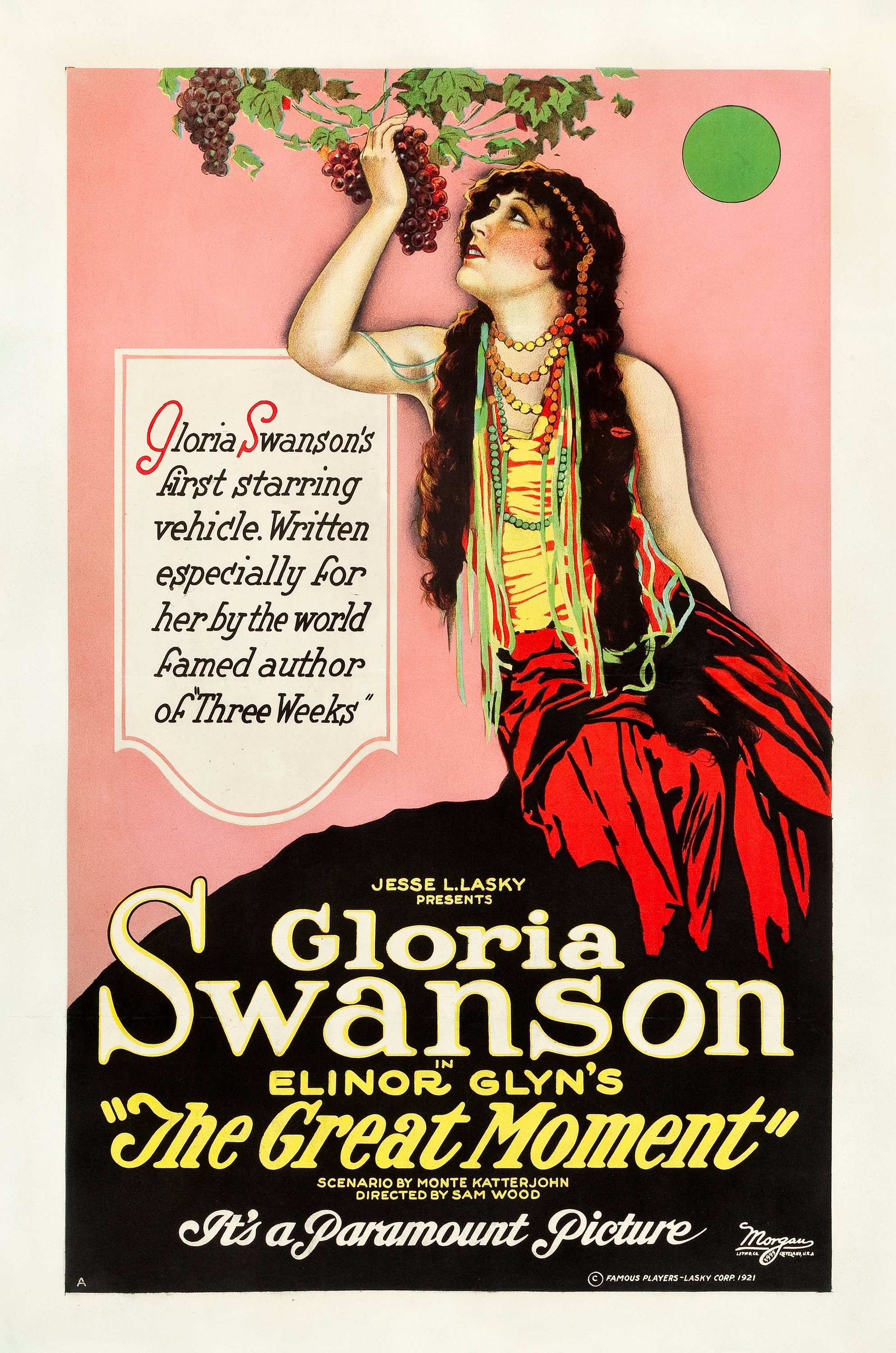
- Theatrical release poster
- Directed by: Sam Wood
- Written by: Monte Katterjohn (scenario)
- Story by: Elinor Glyn
- Produced by: Jesse L. Lasky
- Starring: Gloria Swanson; Alec B. Francis; Milton Sills
- Cinematography: Alfred Gilks
- Distributed by: Paramount Pictures
- Release date: September 4, 1921
- Running time: 70 minutes
- Country: United States
- Language: Silent (English intertitles)

The Great Moment is a 1921 American silent drama film directed by Sam Wood and starring Gloria Swanson, Alec B. Francis, and Milton Sills. The film is now considered lost though a fragment exists and is preserved at the BFI National Archive.

== Plot ==
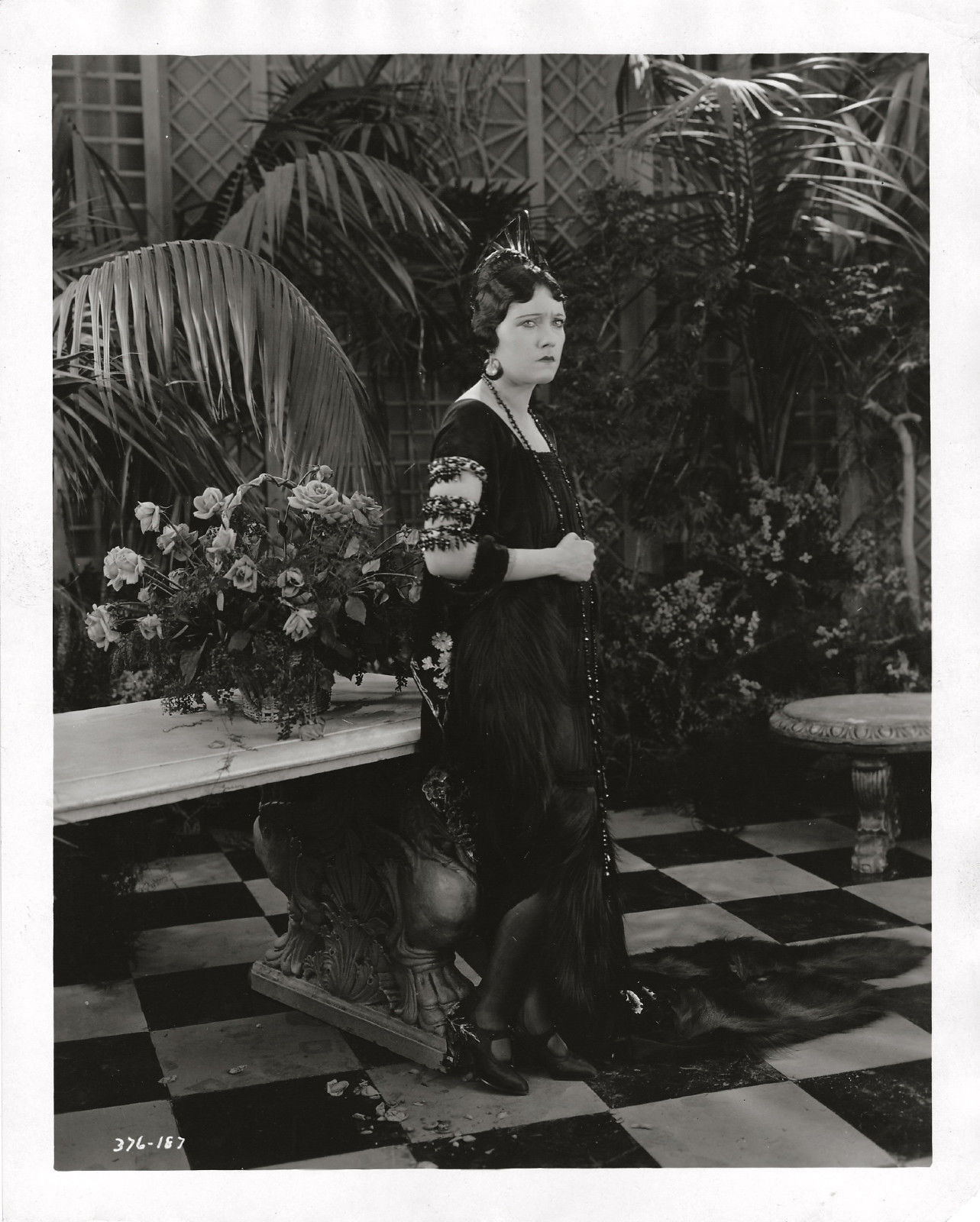
Gloria Swanson in The Great Moment

As described in a film magazine, Sir Edward Pelham, who has married a Russian Gypsy named Nada, fears that his daughter Nadine will follow in her mother's footsteps and arranges a marriage with her cousin Eustace, whom she does not love. Her father takes her and Eustace on a trip to America to look over some mines in Nevada. During the journey she meets Bayard Delaval, a young engineer in her father's employ, and a warm friendship grows between them. While returning with Bayard to the hotel from the mine she is bitten on her breast by a rattlesnake. Bayard uses his pocketknife to open the wound and sucks out the poison. He takes her to his nearby shack and makes her drink some whiskey. Her father finds her with Bayard in his cabin and demands Bayard marry her at once. After the ceremony, Nadine is taken to the hotel and placed under the care of a physician. The father, disregarding all explanations, leaves for home. Recovering from the effects of the liquor, Nadine upbraids Bayard. Believing that Nadine does not love him, Bayard leaves her and prepares to sue for divorce. Sometime later in Washington, Bayard and Nadine meet again on the night of her engagement ball. Nadine has reconciled with her father and has agreed to marry Howard Hopper, a millionaire who is a cad and the talk of Washington society. Her father arrives and seeing Bayard and Nadine together and, told that she loves him, does not stand in the way of their reunion.

== Cast ==
- Gloria Swanson as Nada and Nadine Pelham
- Alec B. Francis as Sir Edward Pelham
- Milton Sills as Bayard Delaval
- F.R. Butler as Eustace
- Raymond Brathwayt as Lord Crombie
- Helen Dunbar as Lady Crombie
- Julia Faye as Sadi Bronson
- Clarence Geldert as Bronson
- Ann Grigg as Blenkensop
- Arthur Stuart Hull as Howard Hopper
