= It (1927 film) =

Film by Clarence G. Badger

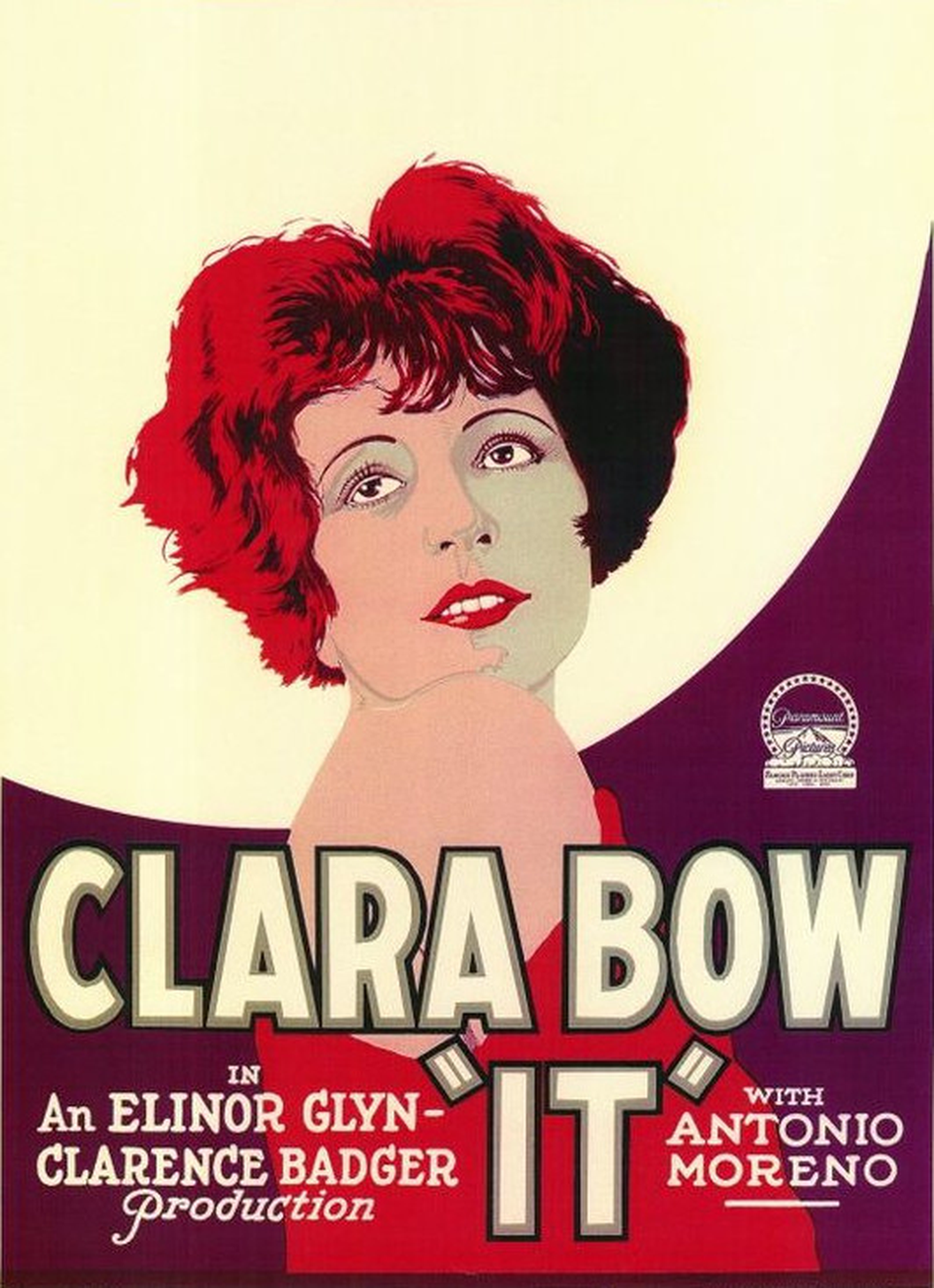
- Theatrical release poster
- Directed by: Clarence G. Badger (Note: Although there are sources giving partial direction credit to Josef von Sternberg, this is doubtful. As per David Stenn, "Josef von Sternberg is often incorrectly credited with directing at least one scene of It." and "Josef von Sternberg is often credited with directing at least one scene of It. He denied this, as do others involved with the movie. (Kevin Brownlow to DS. Also, Priscilla Bonner to DS; DD to DS.)")
- Written by: Elinor Glyn (story and adaptation); George Marion Jr. (titles)
- Screenplay by: Hope Loring; Louis D. Lighton
- Based on: It; 1927 novella by Elinor Glyn
- Produced by: Adolph Zukor; Jesse L. Lasky; B. P. Schulberg
- Starring: Clara Bow; Antonio Moreno; William Austin
- Cinematography: H. Kinley Martin
- Edited by: E. Lloyd Sheldon
- Distributed by: Paramount Pictures
- Release date: February 19, 1927 (United States)
- Running time: 72 minutes
- Country: United States
- Languages: Silent; English intertitles
- Box office: $1 million (U.S. and Canada rentals)

It (1927)

It (stylized in quotation marks) is a 1927 American silent film directed by Clarence G. Badger, and starring Clara Bow. It is based on the serialised novella of the same name, republished in "It" and Other Stories (1927), by Elinor Glyn, who adapted the story and appears in the film as herself.

The film was a box office hit and served as Bow's star vehicle, turning her into one of the most popular actresses of the era. It popularized the concept of the "it girl", with the term "it" defined in the opening as the "quality possessed by some which draws all others with its magnetic force." The film's world premiere was held in Los Angeles on January 14, 1927, followed by a New York showing on February 5, 1927. It was released to the general public on February 19, 1927.

The motion picture was considered lost for many years; however, in the 1960s, a nitrate copy was discovered in Prague. In 2001, It was selected for preservation in the United States National Film Registry by the Library of Congress as being "culturally, historically, or aesthetically significant".

The film's copyright was renewed in 1954, and the film entered the public domain on January 1, 2023.

== Plot ==
Spunky shopgirl Betty Lou Spence has a crush on her handsome employer, Cyrus Waltham Jr., the new manager of and heir to the "world's largest store". However, they belong to different social classes and he is already romantically linked to blonde socialite Adela Van Norman. Cyrus's inept friend Monty notices Betty, and she uses him to get closer to Cyrus.

When Betty finally gets Cyrus's attention, she convinces him to take her on a date to Coney Island, where he is introduced to the proletarian pleasures of roller coasters and hot dogs and has a wonderful time. At the end of the evening, he tries to kiss her. She slaps his face and hurries out of his car and into her flat but then peeks out her window at him as he is leaving.

The next day, meddling welfare workers are trying to take away the baby of Betty's sickly roommate Molly. To protect her friend, Betty bravely claims that the baby is in fact hers. This is overheard by Monty, who tells Cyrus. Although he is in love with her, Cyrus offers her an "arrangement" that includes everything but marriage. Shocked and humiliated, Betty Lou refuses. She soon strives to forget the whole ordeal ever occurred, forgetting Cyrus for the time being. When she learns from Monty about Cyrus's misunderstanding, she fumes and vows to teach her former beau a lesson.

When Cyrus hosts a yachting excursion, Betty Lou makes Monty take her along, masquerading as "Miss Van Cortland". Cyrus at first wants to remove her from the ship, but he cannot long resist Betty Lou's it factor; he eventually corners her and proposes marriage, but she retaliates, telling him that she would "rather marry his office boy". The retort accomplishes her goal, but it breaks her heart. He then learns the truth about the baby and leaves Monty at the yacht's helm to find her. Monty crashes the yacht into a fishing boat, tossing both Betty Lou and Adela into the water. Betty Lou saves Adela, punching her in the face when Adela's panicked flailing threatens to drown them both. At the end of the film, she and Cyrus reconcile on the anchor of the yacht, with the first two letters of the ship's name, Itola, between them. Monty and Adela are upset at losing their friends, but it is implied they pursue a relationship with each other as the film ends.

Publicity photos

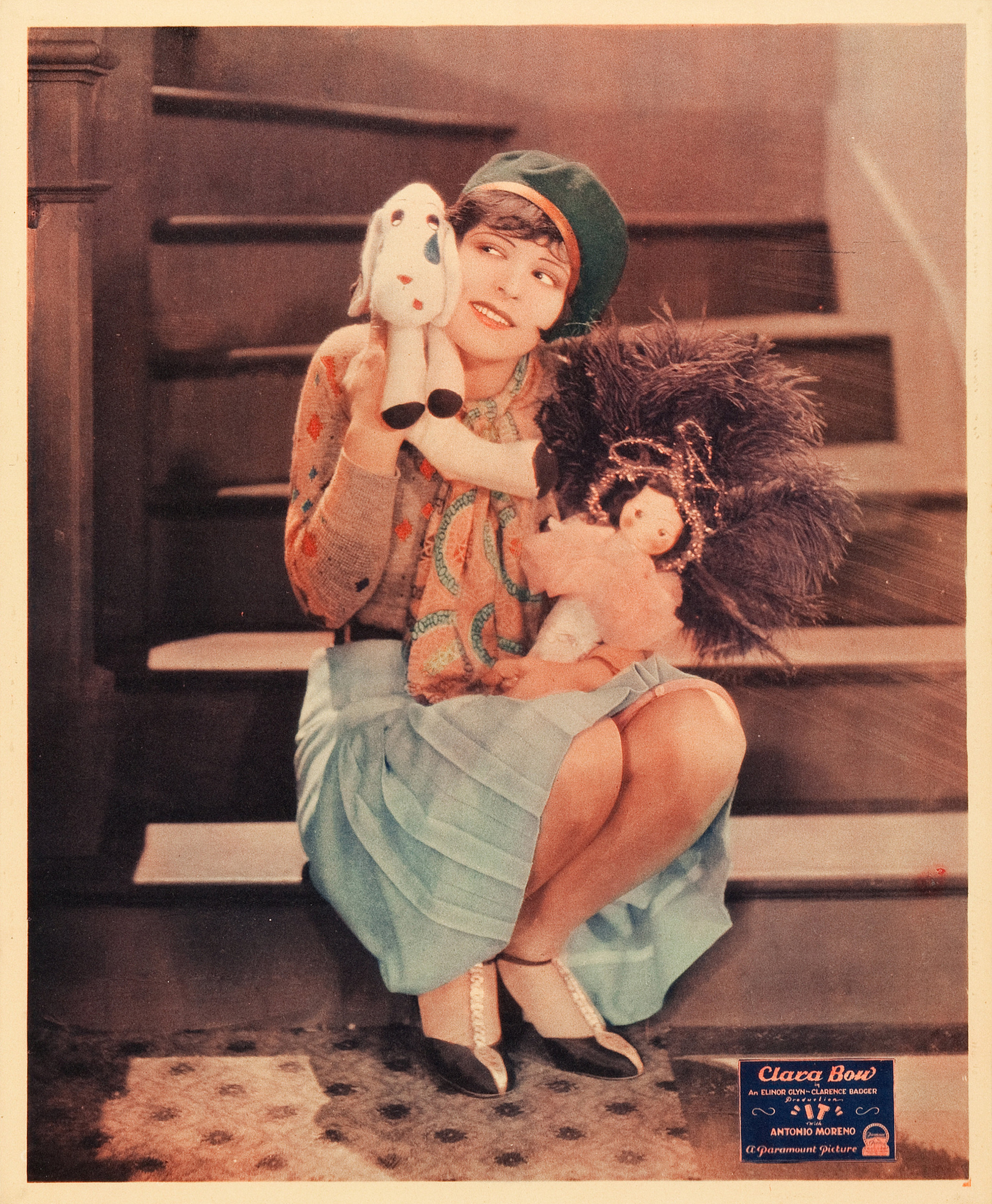
Clara Bow as Betty Lou Spence

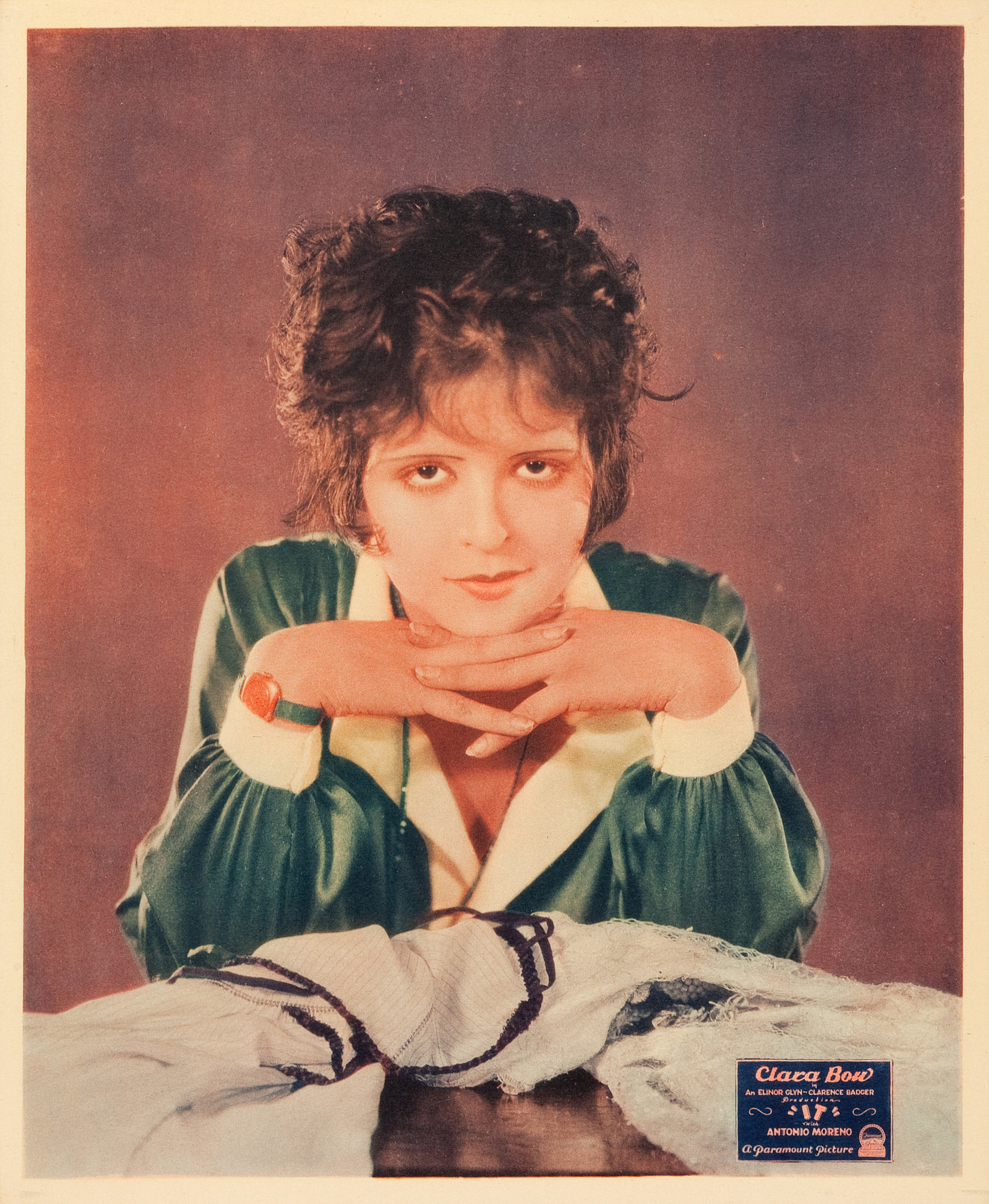
Bow

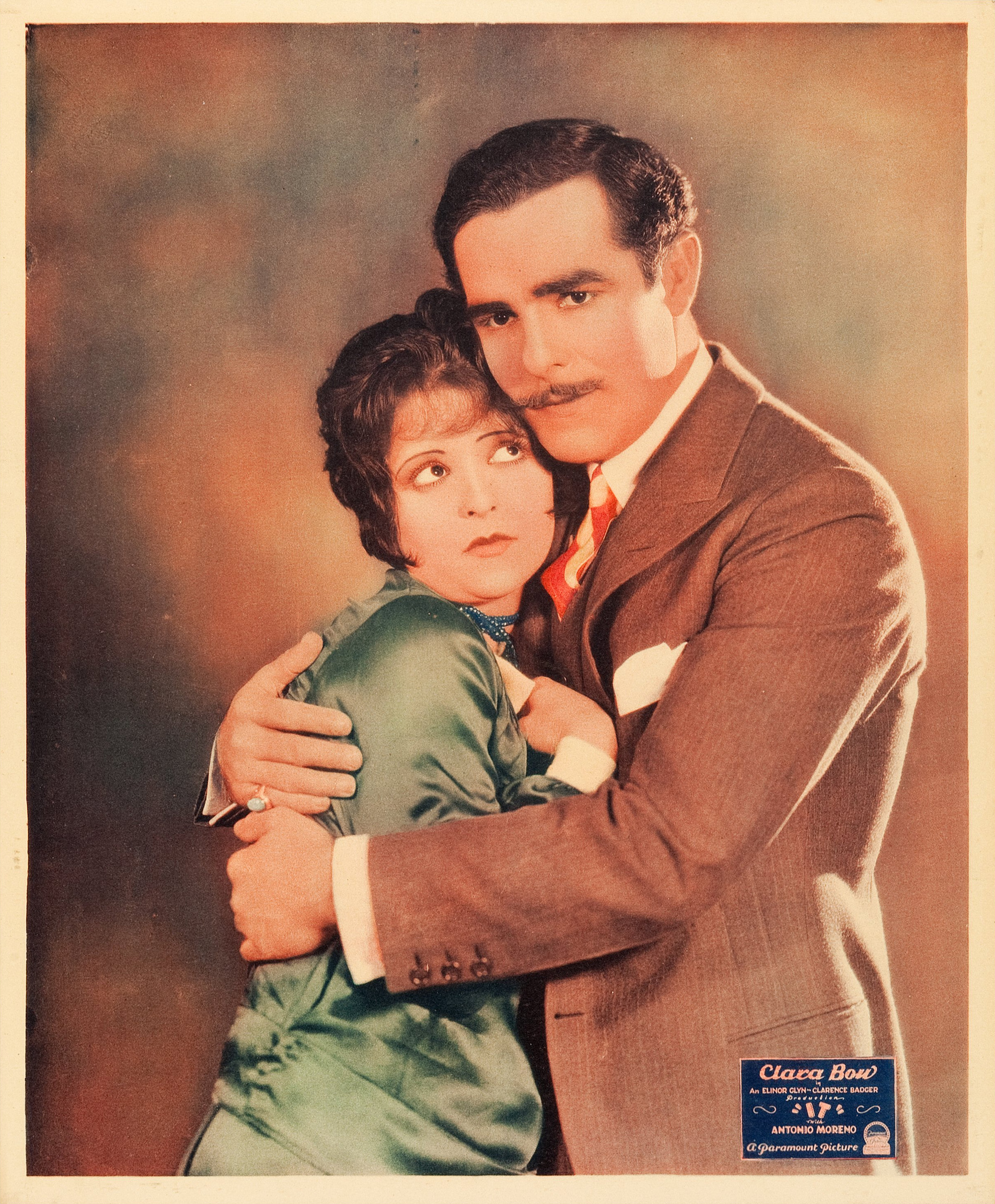
Bow and Antonio Moreno as Cyrus Waltham Jr.

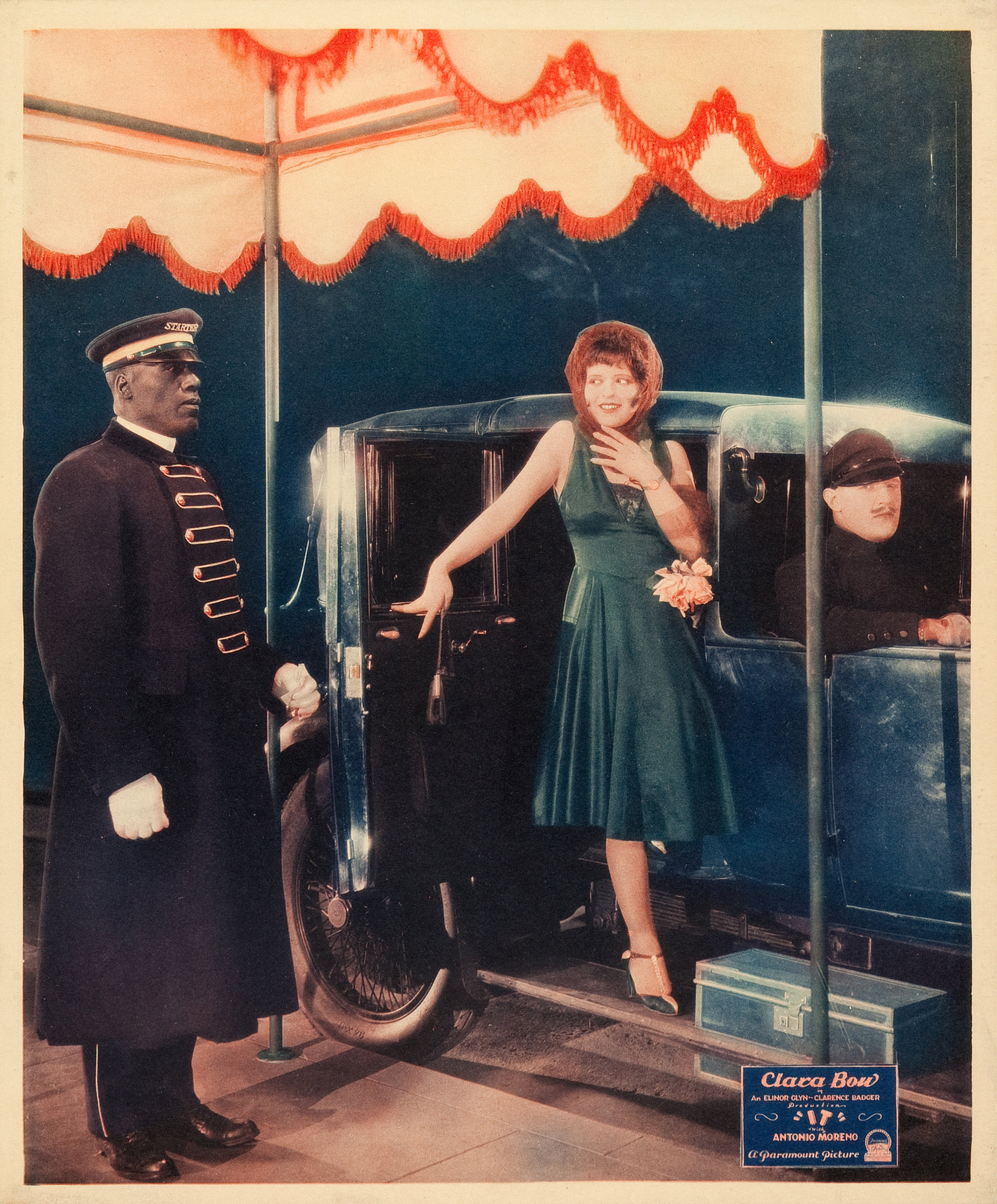
Bow

== Cast ==
- Clara Bow as Betty Lou Spence
- Antonio Moreno as Cyrus T. Waltham
- William Austin as "Monty" Montgomery
- Priscilla Bonner as Molly
- Jacqueline Gadsdon as Adela Van Norman
- Julia Swayne Gordon as Mrs. Van Norman
- Elinor Glyn as Madame Elinor Glyn
- Gary Cooper as Reporter

== The concept of "It" ==
The invention of the concept It is generally attributed to Elinor Glyn, but already in 1904, Rudyard Kipling, in the short story "Mrs. Bathurst" introduced It.

It isn't beauty, so to speak, nor good talk necessarily. It's just 'It'. Some women will stay in a man's memory if they once walk down the street.

In February 1927 Cosmopolitan published a two-part serial story in which Glyn defined It.

That quality possessed by some which draws all others with its magnetic force. With 'It' you win all men if you are a woman and all women if you are a man. 'It' can be a quality of the mind as well as a physical attraction.

== Production ==
Paramount Pictures paid Glyn $50,000 for the concept, gave her a small part in the film as herself, and gave her a "story and adaptation" credit.

Hope Loring, Louis D. Lighton and George Marion Jr. (intertitles) wrote the screenplay and Carl Sandburg noted that Glyn's magazine story was "not at all like the film, not like it in any respect." In the original version of the story, the character with the magnetic personality was a male. Paramount producers suggested the character be female. Also the original female character, Ava Cleveland, was upper class whereas Betty Lou is working class. Nevertheless, Glyn was fully involved in the film adaptation and was very flexible about the transition.

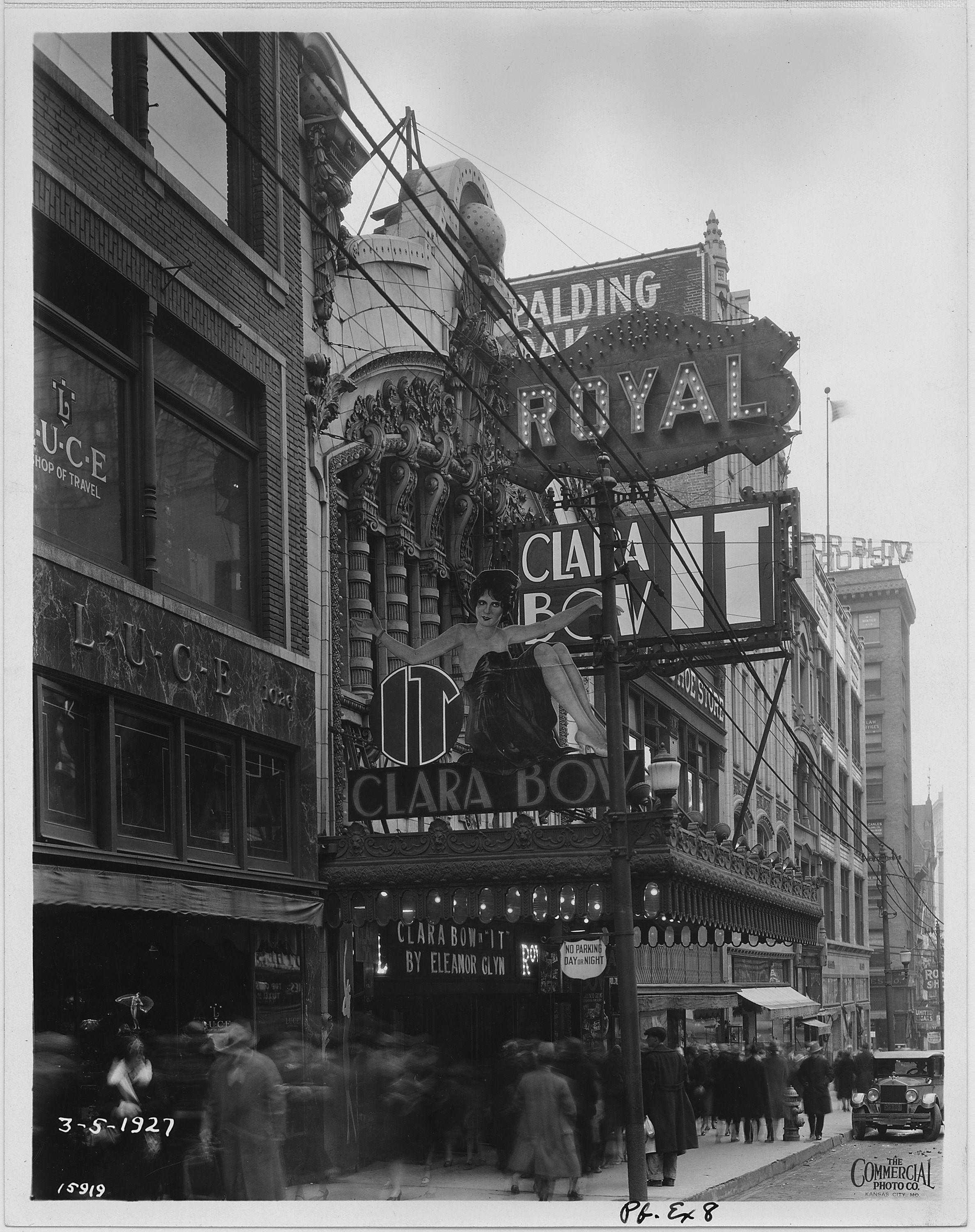
Clara Bow on the marquee of the Theatre Royal in Kansas City showing It

This is one of the first examples of a "concept film", as well as one of the earlier examples of product placement. The concept of "It" is referred to throughout the film, including the scene where Glyn appears as herself and defines "It" for Mr. Waltham. Cosmopolitan magazine is featured prominently in a scene where the character Monty reads Glyn's story and introduces it to the audience.

Stage actress Dorothy Tree made her screen debut in a small, uncredited, part. A young Gary Cooper was cast in a minor role as a newspaper reporter.

== Reception ==
It was a hit with audiences all over the United States, breaking box-office records. Critics praised the film, especially its star, as "a joy to behold". It turned Clara Bow from an up-and-coming movie actress into a film legend as a result of It. She was described as the "Jazz Baby of the Jazz Age". The term "The It girl" has since entered the cultural lexicon.

A scene from the film is included in the 1931 Paramount promotional compilation film The House That Shadows Built.

== See also ==
- Manic Pixie Dream Girl, a 21st-century stock character
