= Three Weeks (1914 film) =

- Directed by: Perry N. Vekroff
- Written by: Perry N. Vekroff
- Produced by: B. S. Moss
- Starring: Madlaine Traverse; George Pearce
- Cinematography: Harold Louis Miller
- Production company: Reliable Feature Film Corp.
- Release date: October 8, 1914
- Running time: 5 reels
- Country: USA
- Language: Silent (English subtitles)

Three Weeks is a 1914 American silent drama film directed and written by Perry N. Vekroff, adapted from the novel of the same name by Elinor Glyn, and produced by Reliable Feature Film Corp.

== Plot ==
The dethroned King Alexis of Veseria is exiled from his kingdom with his motherless son, an infant prince with three moles on his left arm. King Alexis vows to live forever under a false name in obscurity, with only a couple beautiful dresses that suggest their noble origin.

Twenty-two years pass, and the unworthy King Stefan sits upon the Veserian throne alongside Queen Sonia, the patriotic daughter of a neighboring country. They have no heir to tie their countries together, and Sonia grows worried that her homeland will withdraw support if their emperor learns of his drunken behavior.

Eventually he grows unbearable, and heeding the Prime Minister's advice, Sonia journeys with her maid and bodyguard to Lucerne under an assumed name. They arrive at a hotel where Paul Verdyne forces his acquaintance upon Sonia, and falls in love with her. Initially, she is ambivalent to his advances, but she grows fond of him and realizes that she is falling in love with him. Before she leaves for Veseria, her maid, Anna, faints from the heat and is brought to Paul's apartment where she encounters the dresses that she embroidered twenty-two years prior. She forces him to bare his arm and confirms that he is the exiled prince.

Sonia discovers that he is of royal blood and gives in to her love for him, believing that he will give her an heir. They pledge their love for each other and romance ensues, resulting in pregnancy. She is called back to Veseria, where her husband has been paralyzed and has only a short time to live, and he learns of her romance. He kills her, and Sonia's bodyguard kills Alexis in turn.

Years later, Paul is at the cathedral with the child king. When the church is clear, he kneels in front of the altar and prays for his son, with the spirit of Sonia beside him.

== Cast ==
Prologue

- H. J. Smith as Alexis, King of Veseria
- Baby McGrath as Paul, the infant crown prince
- R. J. Barrett as Nicholas, the Usurper
- Joseph Moore as Stefan, son of Nicholas
- T. Curran as General Savoff
- Pauline Seymour as Anna, the nurse

The Drama

- Madeline Traverse as Sonia, Queen of Veseria
- George Pearce as Stefan, King of Veseria
- John Webb Dillon as General Pavlovitch
- Joseph C. Fay as Mahovitch, the Prime Minister
- Arthur Donaldson as Dimitri, Queen's bodyguard
- Pauline Seymour as Queen's companion
- Claude Cooper as Major Vasilieff, Spy
- Mahlon Hamilton as Paul Verdyne

== Production ==
In June 1914, it was announced that production had begun on Three Weeks, and estimated the cost to be $20,000.

== Reception ==
Variety's review was positive, stating that the cast was "adequate," but disliked Mahlon Hamilton's performance due to his "peculiar walk."

Motion Picture News reviewer Peter Milne gave the film a very positive review, saying of the film "never for one moment does the picture lose the inspired interest of the spectator." He praised Madlaine Traverse for her "excellent characterization" and that she "never overdoes a scene."

The New York Clipper described the film as being "one of the best seen in New York in a long time."
