= Ritzy =

1927 film by Richard Rosson

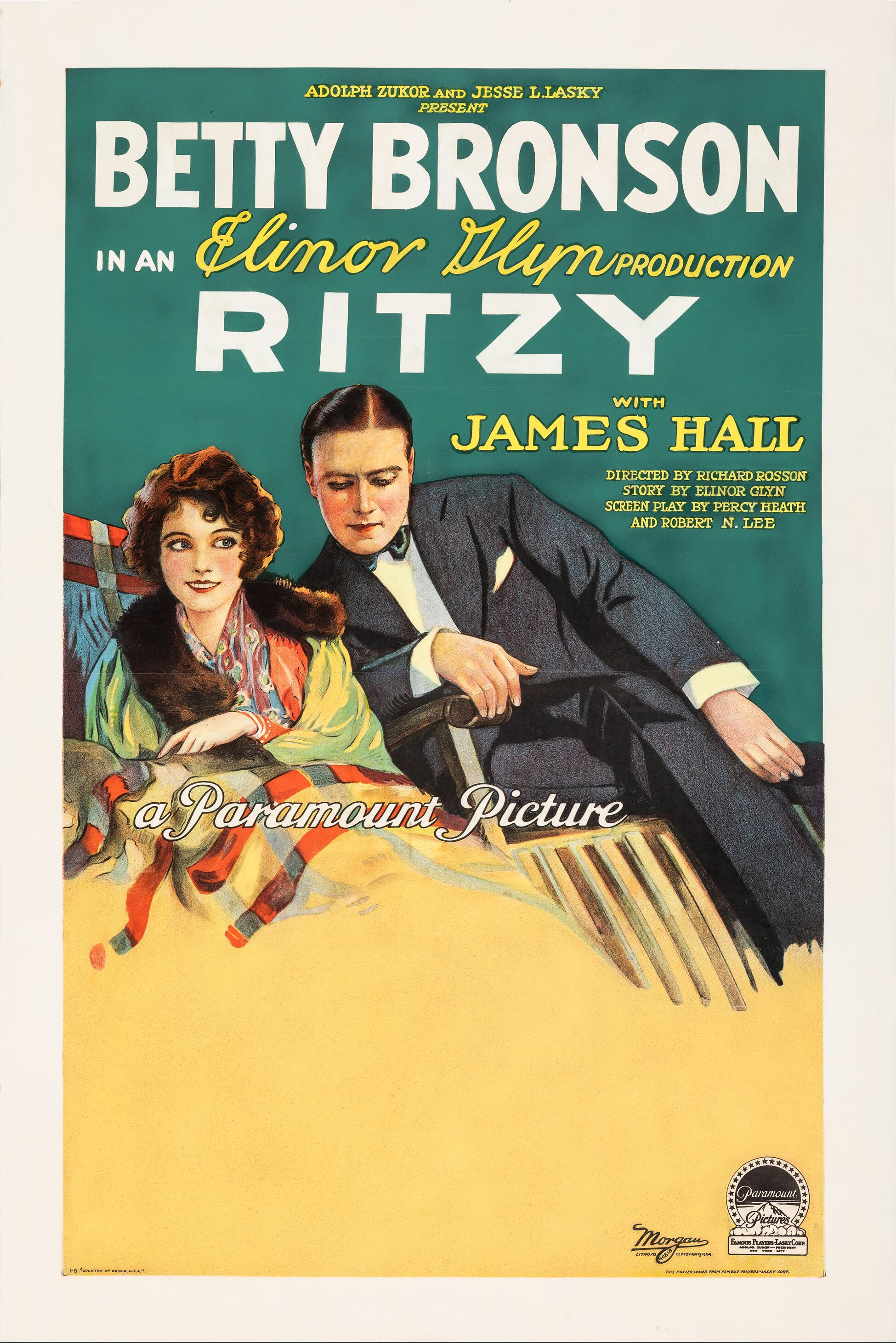
- Theatrical release poster
- Directed by: Richard Rosson
- Screenplay by: Elinor Glyn; Percy Heath; Robert N. Lee; George Marion Jr.
- Produced by: B. P. Schulberg; Jesse L. Lasky; Adolph Zukor
- Starring: Betty Bronson; James Hall; William Austin; Joan Standing; George Nichols; Roscoe Karns
- Cinematography: Charles Lang
- Production company: Famous Players–Lasky Corporation
- Distributed by: Paramount Pictures
- Release date: April 9, 1927
- Running time: 60 minutes
- Country: United States
- Language: English

Ritzy is a lost 1927 American comedy silent film directed by Richard Rosson and written by Elinor Glyn, Percy Heath, Robert N. Lee and George Marion Jr. The film stars Betty Bronson, James Hall, William Austin, Joan Standing, George Nichols and Roscoe Karns. The film was released on April 9, 1927, by Paramount Pictures.

== Cast ==
- Betty Bronson as Ritzy Brown
- James Hall as Harrington Smith, Duke of Westborough
- William Austin as Algy
- Joan Standing as Mary
- George Nichols as Nathan Brown
- Roscoe Karns as Smith's Valet
Lobby cards for the film

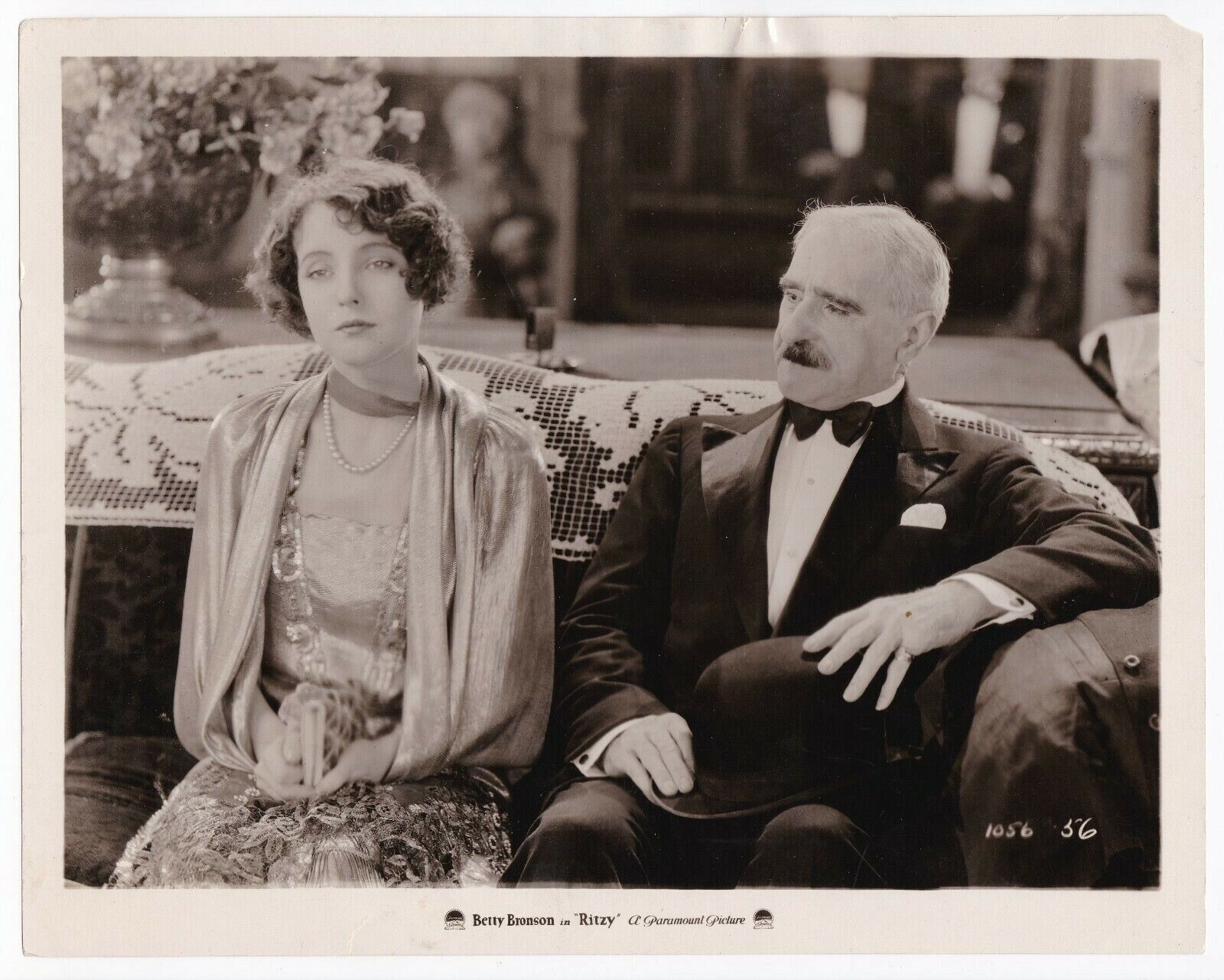

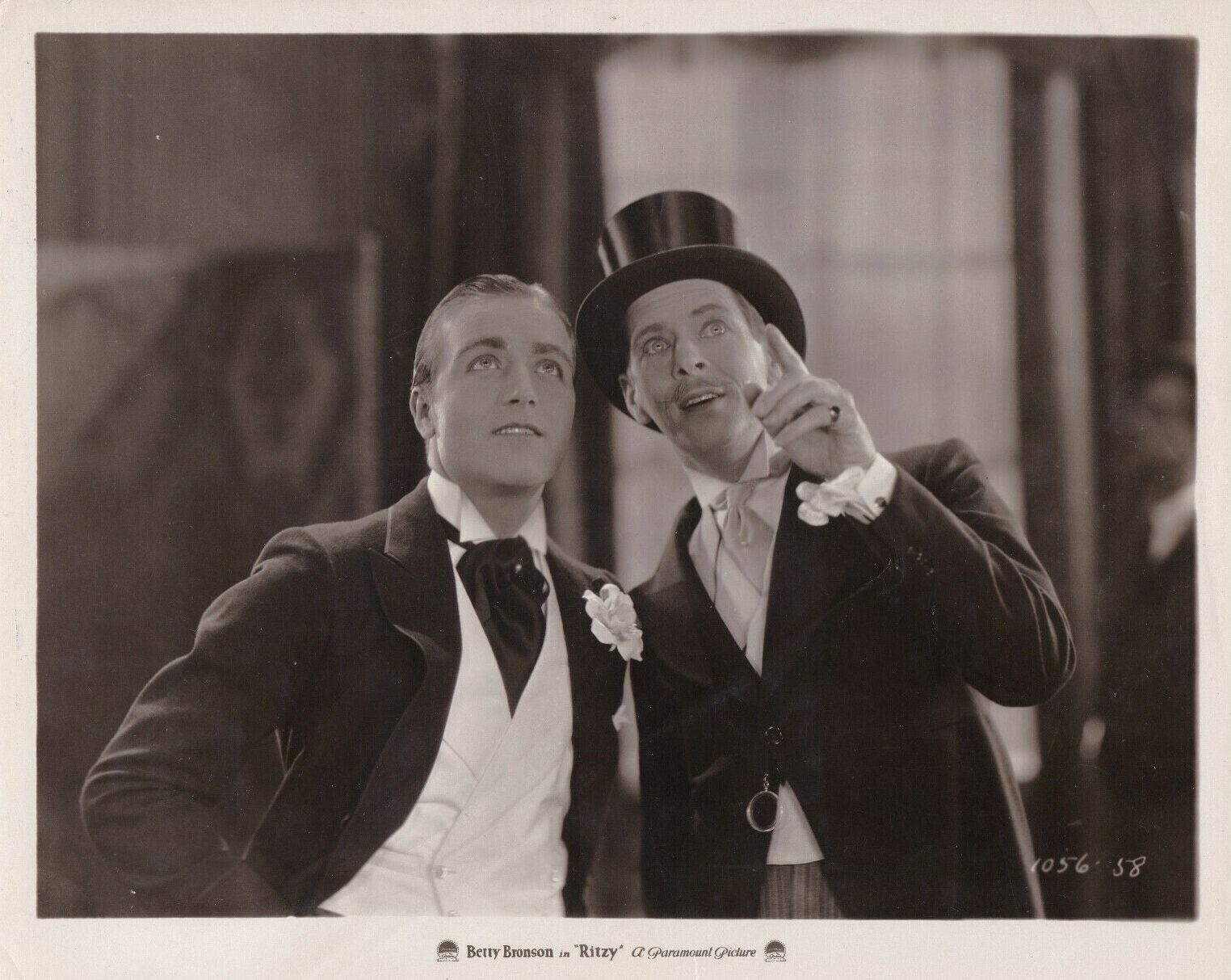

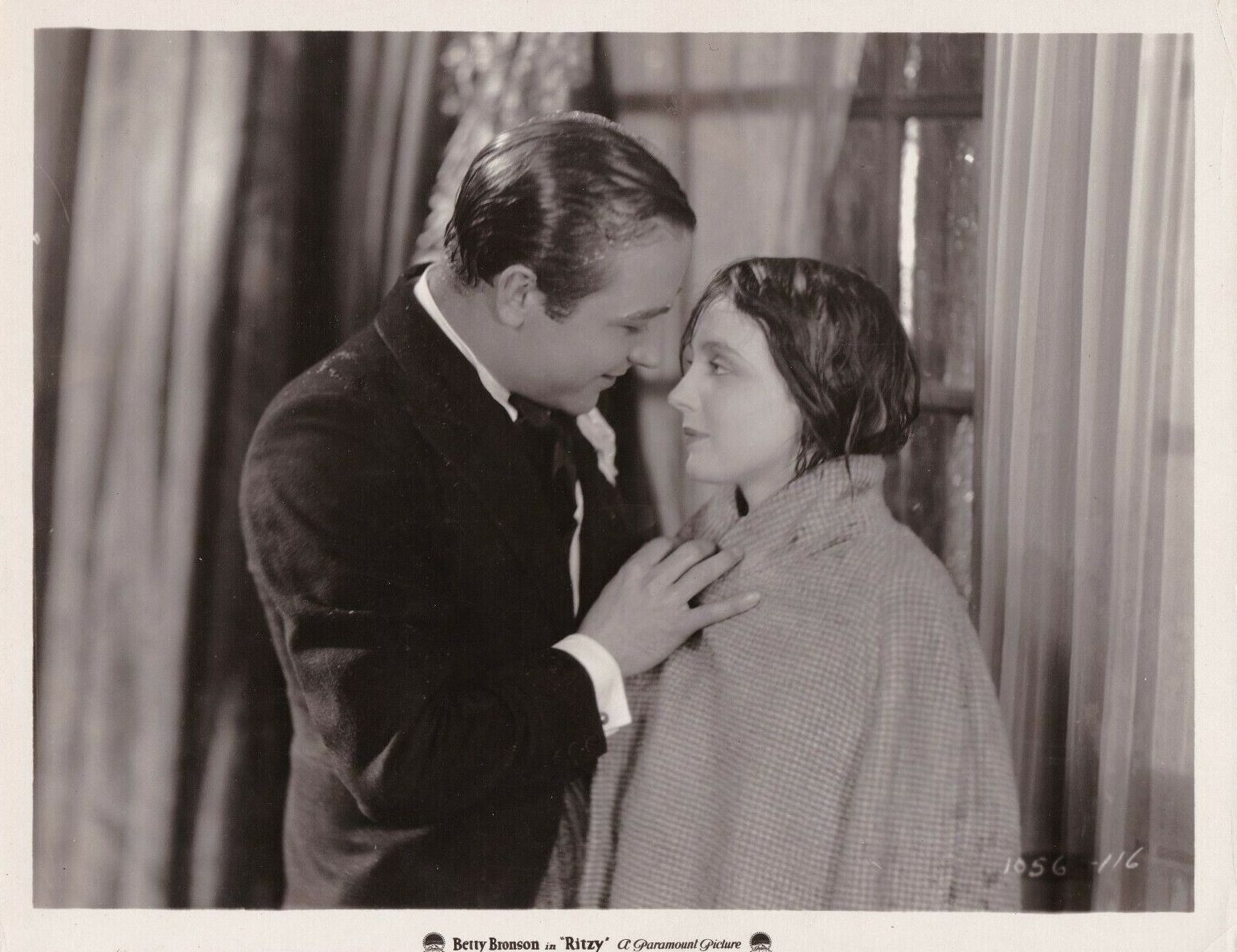
