= Juliet Rhys-Williams =

British writer and politician (1898–1964)

Dame Juliet Rhys-Williams DBE DStJ
- Born: Juliette Evangeline Glyn; 17 December 1898; Epping, Essex, England
- Died: 18 September 1964 (aged 65); Holborn, London, England
- Occupations: Politician, writer
- Spouse: Sir Rhys Rhys-Williams (m. 1921; died 1955)
- Children: 4
- Mother: Elinor Glyn

Dame Juliet Evangeline Rhys-Williams, Lady Rhys-Williams, DBE, DStJ (née Glyn; 17 December 1898 – 18 September 1964) was a British writer and politician who was successively a member of the Liberal National Party, the Liberal Party and the Conservative Party.

== Early life ==
Juliette Evangeline Glyn was the daughter of Clayton Louis Glyn, a barrister, and his wife Elinor Glyn. She was educated in Eastbourne, and joined the Voluntary Aid Detachment aged 15.

She began her career as private secretary to the Director of Training and Staff Duties at the Admiralty in 1918, becoming private secretary to the Parliamentary Secretary, Ministry of Transport, 1919–1920. She was working for Sir Rhys Rhys-Williams, 1st Baronet, and they were married in 1921. Subsequently, she was often known as Lady Williams.

== Political career ==
She contested the 1938 Pontypridd by-election as a Liberal National candidate. Her candidacy attracted popular attention because she decided to stand when her baby daughter was just 8 days old. As a supporter of the National Government she received the formal support of the local Conservative Association. In a two-way contest she polled 40% of the vote. From then on her political activities were in support of the official Liberal Party. In 1943 she became Honorary Secretary of the Women's Liberal Federation. In 1944 she became Chairman of the Publications and Publicity Committee of the Liberal Party, serving for two years. She was a member of the Liberal Party's ruling Council.

Her ideas on income tax reform were published by the Liberal Party. She contested the 1945 general election as the Liberal Party candidate for Ilford North. She resigned after a disagreement on policy matters with her party's leaders.

Lady Rhys-Williams was a member of the Beveridge Committee and unsuccessfully proposed a Basic Income in the form of a negative income tax, as an alternative to the main, insurance based recommendation of the Beveridge Report.

She later joined the Conservative Party, was the secretary (1947–1958) and chair (1958 onwards) of the United Europe Movement and editor of European Review. She was nevertheless against signing the Treaty of Rome and campaigned vigorously against joining the Common Market, which she thought would hand over British sovereignty to Europe and betray the Commonwealth. She also became a prominent member of the right-wing Conservative Monday Club.

== Interests ==
Lady Rhys-Williams was interested in film, and involved in the development of colour film, taking out a patent in 1930, with Sydney George Short.

== Family ==
Sir Rhys and Lady Rhys-Williams had four children; Brandon Rhys-Williams was the second son, and inherited the baronetcy, his elder brother having died in 1943.

== Publications ==
- Doctor Carmichael (1940), London: Herbert Jenkins
- Something to Look Forward to; a Suggestion for a New Social Contract (1943), London: Macdonald
- Family Allowances and Social Security (1944), Liberal Publication Department
- Taxation and Incentive (1953), New York: Oxford University Press
- A New Look at Britain's Economic Policy (1965), Harmondsworth: Penguin
