= Knowing Men =

1930 film

- Sheet music for the film's theme song
- Directed by: Elinor Glyn
- Written by: Edward Knoblock
- Produced by: Elinor Glyn
- Starring: Carl Brisson; Elissa Landi; Helen Haye
- Cinematography: Charles Rosher (In Color)
- Production company: Talkicolor
- Distributed by: United Artists
- Release date: February 1930
- Running time: 95 minutes
- Country: United Kingdom
- Languages: Sound (All-Talking); English

Knowing Men is a 1930 British color sound romantic comedy film directed by Elinor Glyn and starring Carl Brisson, Elissa Landi and Helen Haye. It was written by Edward Koblock based on a novel by Glyn, and made at Elstree Studios. Originally shot using an experimental colour system, it was eventually released in plain black-and-white.

== Cast ==
- Carl Brisson as George Vere
- Elissa Landi as Korah Harley
- Helen Haye as Marquise de Jarmais
- C. M. Hallard as Marquis de Jarnais
- Henry Mollison as Frank Bramber
- Thomas Weguelin as Michelet
- Marjorie Loring as Blanche
- Jeanne de Casalis as Delphine
- David Herbert

== See also ==
- List of early color feature films

== Bibliography ==
- Low, Rachael. Filmmaking in 1930s Britain. George Allen & Unwin, 1985.
- Wood, Linda. British Films, 1927-1939. British Film Institute, 1986.
