= Blanche Sewell =

American film editor (1989–1949)

- Born: Blanche Irene Sewell; October 27, 1898; Lowe Township, Noble County, Oklahoma, USA
- Died: February 2, 1949 (aged 50); Burbank, California, USA
- Education: Hollywood High School
- Occupation: Film editor
- Years active: 1917–1949
- Spouse: Leon Warren Bourgeau (September 23, 1938-February 2, 1949) (her death)
- Children: None

Blanche Irene Sewell (October 27, 1898 – February 2, 1949) was an American film editor. She was best known mainly for her work at Metro-Goldwyn-Mayer studios from 1925 until her death in 1949.

== Early life ==
Sewell was born on October 27, 1898, in Oklahoma. However, she grew up in Idaho, and later moved to Los Angeles.

Sewell was one of, technically, seven children. She had four older brothers, one younger brother, and two younger sisters. Although, one of her younger sisters that was born in 1907 died that same year in infancy.

Her mother died in 1910 after giving birth to her youngest sister, Ida Grace.

Her father was a Methodist minister.

She graduated from Hollywood High School.

== Career ==
At an early age, Sewell turned down acting opportunities to work behind the scenes and ended up working as a negative cutter.

She started working while still in high school in 1917, and worked during her summer vacations.

She then went on to work for Marshall Neilan at First National Pictures as an assistant cutter, working on his 1922 film Minnie.

She also worked as an assistant with Viola Lawrence in 1921, who was considered the first female in film editing.

After her days as an assistant, she became a film editor and worked on several notable films for Metro-Goldwyn-Mayer including The Wizard of Oz, though she did not live to see the film's spectacular success as a television perennial in 1956.

Her editing style was said to have “packed a punch” as she enjoyed editing together action scenes to keep her films interesting, because of this she was in high demand.

She was also consulted by Disney while the original Snow White and the Seven Dwarfs was being edited and helped construct the film.

== Personal life ==
Sewell was married to Leon Warren Bourgeau from September 1938 until her death in February 1949. She and Bourgeau had no children.

She was Walt Disney's sister in law by marriage. Her brother, Glenn Sewell, was married to Hazel Bounds Sewell, the sister of Disney's wife, Lillian. This connection influenced some opportunities she was given as a film editor.

== Death and legacy ==
She died at age 50 on February 2, 1949.

Noted by John Stanley Donaldson, protégé of Herbert Ryman, as having an “intuitive ability for cinematic pacing to strike the proper tempo and temperament.”

She was an influential woman of film during her lifetime.

== Filmography ==
- Dinty (1920)
- Bob Hampton of Placer (1921)
- Bits of Life (1921)
- Minnie (1922)
- Penrod (1922)
- Fools First (1922)
- The Sporting Venus (1925)
- Lights of Old Broadway (1925)
- The Boy Friend (1926)
- Tell It to the Marines (1926)
- Frisco Sally Levy (1927)
- After Midnight (1927)
- Man, Woman and Sin (1927)
- The Cossacks (1928)
- The Flying Fleet (1929)
- The Single Standard (1929)
- Tide of Empire (1929)
- The Trial of Mary Dugan (1929)
- Children of Pleasure (1930)
- The Big House (1930)
- Not So Dumb (1930)
- The Secret 6 (1931)
- Hell Divers (1931)
- Red-Headed Woman (1932)
- Red Dust (1932)
- Grand Hotel (1932)
- The Secret of Madame Blanche (1933)
- Reunion in Vienna (1933)
- Tugboat Annie (1933)
- Beauty for Sale (1933)
- Queen Christina (1933)
- Laughing Boy (1934)
- Treasure Island (1934)
- What Every Woman Knows (1934)
- Naughty Marietta (1935)
- The Flame Within (1935)
- Broadway Melody of 1936 (1935)
- Rose Marie (1936)
- Small Town Girl (1936)
- The Gorgeous Hussy (1936)
- Born to Dance (1936)
- Dangerous Number (1937)
- Broadway Melody of 1938 (1937)
- Rosalie (1937)
- Yellow Jack (1938)
- Listen, Darling (1938)
- The Wizard of Oz (1939)
- Broadway Melody of 1940 (1940)
- Two Girls on Broadway (1940)
- Boom Town (1940)
- Go West (1940)
- Ziegfeld Girl (1941)
- They Met in Bombay (1941)
- Honky Tonk (1941)
- Ship Ahoy (1942)
- Panama Hattie (1942)
- Seven Sweethearts (1942)
- DuBarry Was a Lady (1943)
- Best Foot Forward (1943)
- The Heavenly Body (1944)
- Bathing Beauty (1944)
- The Valley of Decision (1945)
- Easy to Wed (1946)
- It Happened in Brooklyn (1947)
- Fiesta (1947)
- The Pirate (1948)
- Take Me Out to the Ball Game (1949)

== See also ==
- Women in film editing
- Women in film
