= Souls for Sale =

1923 film

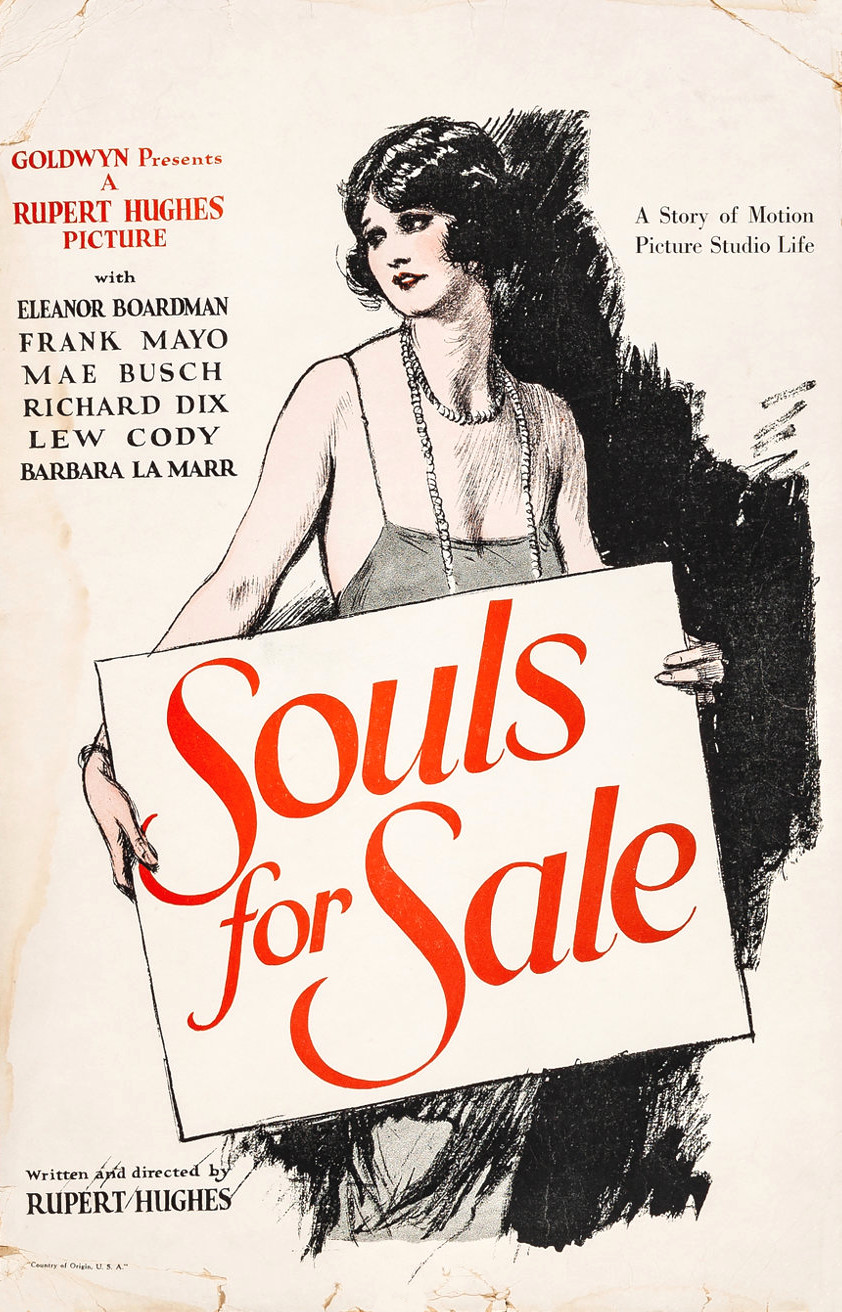
- Original theatrical poster
- Directed by: Rupert Hughes
- Written by: Rupert Hughes (adaptation)
- Based on: Souls for Sale; 1922 novel by Rupert Hughes
- Produced by: Rupert Hughes
- Starring: Eleanor Boardman; Frank Mayo; Mae Busch; Richard Dix; Lew Cody; Barbara La Marr
- Cinematography: John J. Mescall
- Music by: Marcus Sjöwall (2006)
- Production company: Goldwyn Pictures
- Release date: March 27, 1923 (U.S.)
- Running time: 90 minutes
- Country: United States
- Language: Silent (English intertitles)

Souls for Sale is a 1923 American silent comedy drama film written, directed, and produced by Rupert Hughes, based on the novel of the same name by Hughes. The film stars Eleanor Boardman in her first leading role, having won a contract with Goldwyn Pictures through their highly publicized "New Faces of 1922" contest just two years earlier.

The film is notable for its insights into the early film industry. Among the significant cameos in the film are appearances by directors King Vidor, Fred Niblo, Marshall Neilan, Charlie Chaplin, and Erich von Stroheim, as well as a number of actors, producers, and other filmmakers. Souls for Sale includes rare behind-the-scenes footage of Chaplin and von Stroheim directing the films A Woman of Paris and Greed, respectively.

Souls for Sale was previously thought to have been lost until incomplete prints of the film were discovered. The film was later restored and aired on Turner Classic Movies and was released on DVD in June 2009.

Souls for Sale is one of many works from 1923 that entered the public domain in the United States in 2019.

== Plot ==
Souls for Sale (1923)

Remember "Mem" Steddon marries Owen Scudder after a whirlwind courtship. However, on their wedding night, she has a change of heart. When the train taking them to Los Angeles stops for water, she impulsively and secretly gets off in the middle of the desert. Strangely, when Scudder realizes she is gone, he does not have the train stopped.

Mem sets off in search of civilization. Severely dehydrated, she sees an unusual sight: an Arab on a camel. It turns out to be actor Tom Holby; she has stumbled upon a film being shot on location. When she recuperates, she is given a role as an extra. Both Holby and director Frank Claymore are attracted to her. However, when filming ends, she does not follow the troupe back to Hollywood, but rather, gets a job at a desert inn.

Meanwhile, Scudder is recognized and arrested at the train station. He turns out to be a cold-blooded murderer who marries women, insures them, and then kills them for the payoff. He escapes and persuades a gullible Abigail Tweedy to file off his handcuffs. She becomes his next victim, though fortunately for her, he only assaults her and robs her of her savings. He leaves the country and targets Englishwoman "Lady Jane". To his profound embarrassment, she turns out to be the same sort of crook as he; she and her father "Lord Fryingham" rob him, but let him live.

When the inn closes for the season, Mem travels to Hollywood in search of work. Her actress friend from the desert shoot, Leva Lemaire, persuades Claymore to give her a screen test for the only uncast role in his next production: a comic part. Though she fails miserably, Claymore decides to train her anyway. She proves to be talented and steadily gets better and better parts.

Just as Mem is rising to fame, Scudder returns and sneaks into her bedroom. Holby and Claymore have become rivals for Mem's affections. When Scudder sees their warmly-autographed photographs, he flies into a jealous rage. Mem, aware of her husband's past and fearful of a career-ending scandal, offers him money to leave her alone, but he still wants her. Scudder leaves only when she threatens to kill herself. Claymore shows up, but when Scudder overhears the director propose marriage to his protégée, Scudder tries to shoot him. Claymore wrestles away his gun, but lets him go at Mem's urging.

When star Robina Teele is seriously injured by a falling light, Claymore decides to have Mem take her place. Filming continues on an outdoor circus set, complete with a full-scale Big Top tent. In the climax, a lightning storm sets the huge tent on fire in the middle of filming. (Claymore orders his cameramen to keep shooting.) Scudder, who has sneaked into the audience of extras, takes advantage of the panic and confusion to try to kill an unsuspecting Claymore by driving a wind machine (with a deadly propeller) at him. Holby spots Scudder and struggles with him. When Mem stumbles into the machine's path, Scudder rushes to save her and loses his own life. He apologizes before dying, explaining that all his life there was something wrong with him, but he did at least one thing right: they were never legally married after all. Afterward, Mem chooses Claymore over Holby.

== Cast ==
- Eleanor Boardman as Remember "Mem" Steddon
- Lew Cody as Owen Scudder
- Richard Dix as Frank Claymore
- Mae Busch as Robina Teele
- Frank Mayo as Tom Holby
- Barbara La Marr as Leva Lamaire
- Arthur Hoyt as Jimmy Leland
- David Imboden as Caxton
- Roy Atwell as Arthur Tirrey
- Forrest Robinson as Rev. John Steddon, Mem's father
- Edith Yorke as Mrs. Steddon, Mem's mother
- William Orlamond as Lord Fryingham
- Aileen Pringle as Lady Jane
- Snitz Edwards as Komical Kale, the clown
- William Haines as Pinkey, the assistant director
- Eve Southern as Velma Slade
- Dale Fuller as Abigail Tweedy

Cast notes:

- This was the first film in which William Haines was credited as part of the cast.
- Numerous stars of the silent era have cameos in this film. Erich von Stroheim is shown filming a scene from Greed. Charlie Chaplin guides Boardman in a fake scene from A Woman of Paris, which he did actually direct. The making of two other films, The Eternal Three and The Famous Mrs. Fair, is also presented. Other cameos include Hobart Bosworth, Barbara Bedford, Chester Conklin, William H. Crane, Kenneth C. Beaton (K.C.B.), Elliott Dexter, Raymond Griffith, Bessie Love, June Mathis, Marshall Neilan, ZaSu Pitts, John St. Polis, Kathlyn Williams, and Claire Windsor.

== Production ==
Writer/director Rupert Hughes was the brother of Howard Hughes Sr., and he introduced his nephew Howard Hughes Jr. to the world of Hollywood movies.

== Reception ==
On the review aggregator website Rotten Tomatoes, Souls for Sale has a 63% approval rating based on 5 reviews.

Carl Sandburg wrote in a contemporaneous review that it "[Sets] forth an eloquent advocacy of the viewpoint of Hollywood and the heart of moviedom by anyone who believes in it." Roger Ebert of the Chicago-Sun Times added it to his Great Movies list in 2009, writing, "It isn't on any list of great movies I've ever seen, possibly because hardly anyone has seen it for more than 75 years... Filled with actors who were then stars, fast-moving, entertaining, with a spectacular circus action sequence at the climax, it is drama, melodrama, romance and satire all at once--wrapped up in a behind-the-scenes at how a desperate young woman fell into the movie business by accident and became a star.

== Rediscovery ==
Souls for Sale was thought to be lost, until copies began surfacing in various film vaults and private collections in the 1980s and 1990s. In 2005, a partnership between MGM and Turner Classic Movies resulted in a restored print of the film. Marcus Sjöwall, winner of TCM's Young Film Composers Competition, composed a new score for the film. The restored version with the new score premiered on TCM on January 24, 2006.

== Home media ==
In June 2009, the Warner Archive Collection released Souls for Sale on manufactured-on-demand DVD.

== See also ==
- List of United States comedy films
- List of rediscovered films
