= Marion Fairfax =

American actress, playwright and producer (1875–1970)

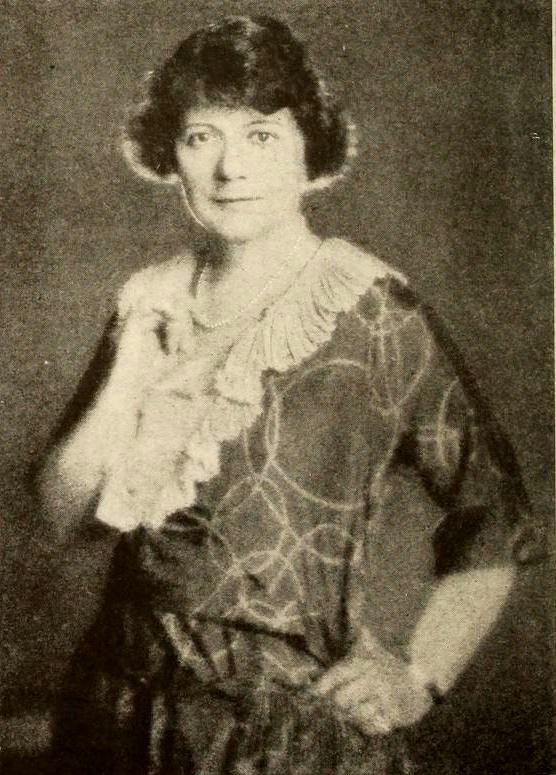
- Fairfax in 1923
- Born: Marion Neiswanger; October 24, 1875; Richmond, Virginia, U.S.
- Died: October 2, 1970 (aged 94); Los Angeles, California, U.S.
- Occupations: Screenwriter; playwright; actress; producer
- Years active: 1901–1926
- Spouse: Tully Marshall (m. 1899; died 1943)

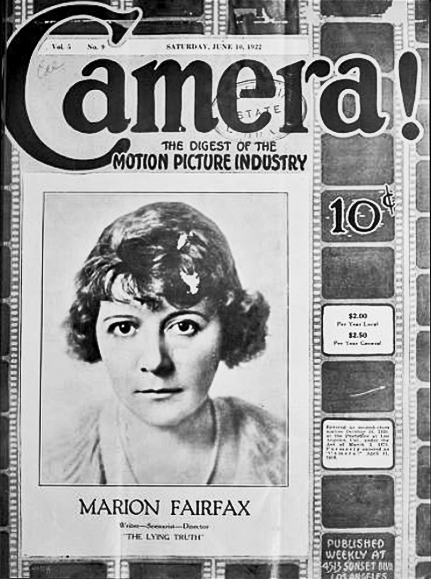
Marion Fairfax on 1922 magazine cover

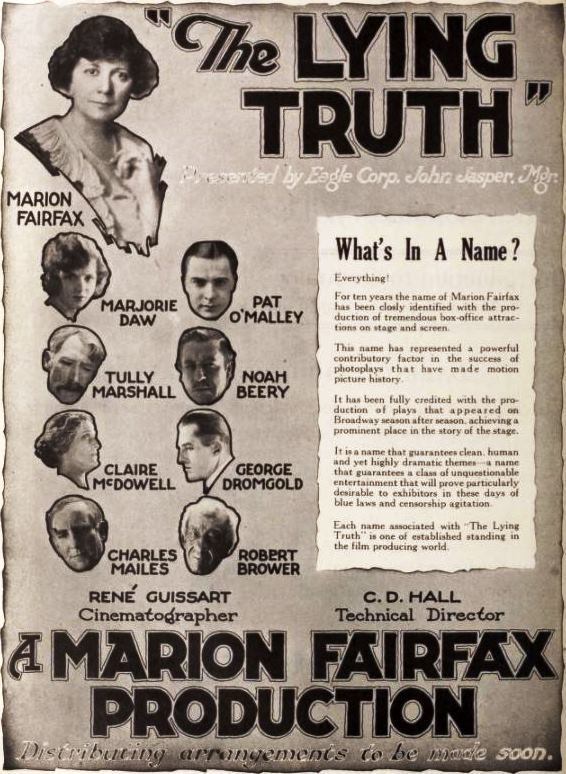
Publicity for The Lying Truth (1922)

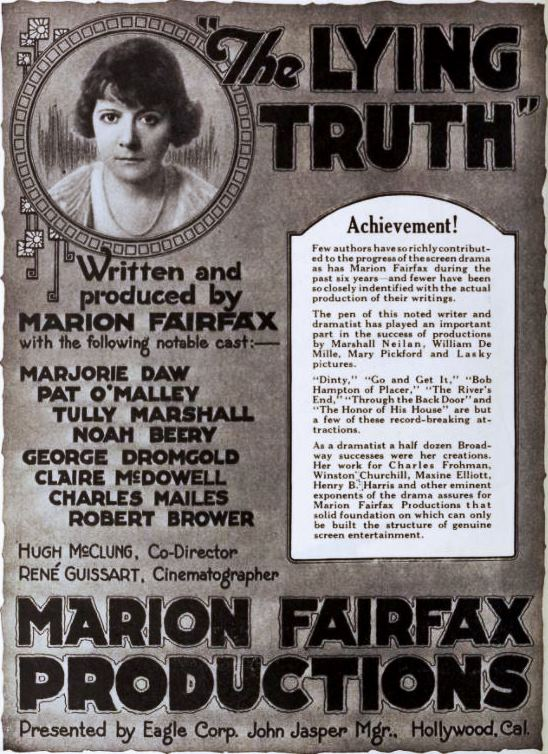
The Lying Truth (1922) publicity

Marion Fairfax (born Marion Neiswanger; October 24, 1875 – October 2, 1970) was an American screenwriter, playwright, actress, and producer.

== Early career ==
Fairfax first started her career as a stage actress. By 1901 she was appearing on Broadway and soon after that her own plays started appearing on Broadway. Before she went into pictures she was known for being one of the most distinguished stage authors in the United States, writing Broadway hits such as The Builders (1907), The Chaperon (1908), The Talker (1912), A Modern Girl (1914), In 1915 The Lasky Feature Play Company entered into a contract with Fairfax. This opportunity gave Fairfax the chance to work under William C. deMille who is known as the author for many successful plays such as "The Warrens of Virginia" and "The Woman." The success of Fairfax comes through wide knowledge of dramatic values, not only from an author's perspective but also from that of the artist.

Fairfax's production career began with the Paramount Company. During her time there she wrote the scripts to multiple successful photoplays such as The Clown, The Honor of His House, The Valley of the Giants, The Westerner, The Sowers, The Immigrant and many more. In October 1920 Fairfax renewed a contract with Marshall Neilan. After building a successful resume with Neilan, which included the production and script writing of films such as Don't ever marry, The Rivers End, Dinty and Go and Get it, Fairfax was in charge of Neilan's next four films. Her first project is based on a Ben Ames Williams magazine story called Not a Drum Was Heard.

== Marion Fairfax Productions ==
After spending her early career with Neilan, Fairfax soon developed her own production company in 1921. At this point in her career Fairfax was known for being a famous playwright and a very successful screenwriter. Many other women have attempted to pursue careers in film at this point but it was Lois Weber and Fairfax proving that women can survive in the film industry. Exhibitors Herald asked Fairfax about the start of her own company and she had this to say: "The formation of Marion Fairfax Productions is not the result of a sudden decision or and overnight idea. It is the realization of a plan that I have studied and worked out for over a year. I believe there is a place for the combination of literary effort and motion picture presentation just as there is a place for the combination of literary achievement and stage presentation." With a new production company at her disposal Fairfax began working on a highly anticipated film called The Lying Truth which starred Marjorie Daw, J. Pat O'Malley, Noah Beery, Sr., and her husband the actor Tully Marshall. Released in July 1922 The Lying Truth was quickly recognized as a masterpiece.

Fairfax's success with her own production company provided her with enough experience and credibility in the film industry to progress even further. In September 1923 she was signed to the writing staff of Associated First National Pictures, Inc. Acquiring Fairfax gave First National Picture a popular writer who at the time was specializing in original stories and adaptions of popular plays. After two years of writing for First National Editorial, Fairfax resigned from her post to enter the production field again. At the time Fairfax was one of the most accomplished playwrights in New York Theater and an author scenarist, editorial and production supervisor of film plays. Her previous experience and success as the head of Marion Fairfax Production made this transition effortless.

== Later career ==
Not long after her separation from First National Picture Inc. Fairfax formed an alliance with Sam E. Rork that would cut the production cost for two producers working together. Ideally the plan would allow both producers to have shared access to technical staff by way of production scheduling. While one producer is cutting a picture and preparing for their next project the other would be utilizing the designated "shooting staff." This dual production plan allows these two independent producers to have access to a permanent technical organization. Without a dual partnership these two producers would have a very hard time trying to afford such an imperative function of film production. In 1926 Fairfax co-produced The Blonde Saint (1926), but this was her final film with Rork. Following an illness, she disappeared from film making but continued to write for periodicals. Fairfax died October 2, 1970.

== Filmography ==
- The Chorus Lady (1915)
- Mr. Grex of Monte Carlo (scenario) (1915)
- The Immigrant (scenario) (1915)
- Tennessee's Pardner (scenario) (1915)
- The Blacklist (1916)
- The Sowers (scenario) (1916)
- The Clown (1916)
- Common Ground (1916)
- Anton the Terrible (scenario) (1916)
- The Chaperon (play) (1916)
- The Primrose Ring (scenario) (1916)
- Freckles (scenario) (1917)
- The Crystal Gazer (scenario) (1917)
- Hashimura Togo (scenario) (1917)
- On the Level (scenario) (1917)
- The Secret Game (scenario) / (screenplay) / (story) (1917)
- The Widow's Might (screenplay) / (story) (1917)
- The Honor of His House (scenario) / (screenplay) / (story) (1918)
- The White Man's Law (scenario) / (story) (1918)
- Less Than Kin (writer) (1918)
- The Mystery Girl (scenario) (1918)
- The Secret Garden (scenario) (1918)
- You Never Saw Such a Girl (scenario) (1919)
- The Roaring Road (scenario) (1919)
- Putting It Over (writer) (1919)
- A Daughter of the Wolf (writer) (1919)
- Love Insurance (scenario) (1919)
- The Valley of the Giants (writer) (1919)
- The River's End (scenario) (1920)
- Don't Ever Marry (1920)
- Go and Get It (1920)
- Dinty (1920)
- The Mad Marriage (1921)
- Bob Hampton of Placer (1921)
- Through the Back Door (1921)
- The Lotus Eater (1921)
- Sherlock Holmes (1922)
- The Lying Truth (screenplay) / (story) (1922)
- Fools First (1922)
- The Snowshoe Trail (1922)
- A Lady of Quality (1924)
- Torment (titles) (1924)
- Lilies of the Field (1924)
- As Man Desires (scenario) (1924)
- The Lost World (screenplay) (1925)
- The Talker (play) / (adaptation) (1925)
- Clothes Make the Pirate (adaptation) / (screenplay) (1925)
- Old Loves and New (adaptation) (1926)
- The Blonde Saint (1926)
