= The Great Love =

The Great Love can refer to the following films:

- The Great Love (1918 film), an American silent film starring Lillian Gish
- The Great Love (1925 film), an American silent film starring Zazu Pitts
- The Great Love (1931 film), an Austrian film directed by Otto Preminger
- The Great Love (1938 film), a Swedish comedy film starring Tutta Rolf
- The Great Love (1942 film), a German film starring Zarah Leander
- The Great Love (1969 film), a French film
