= The Lying Truth =

1922 film

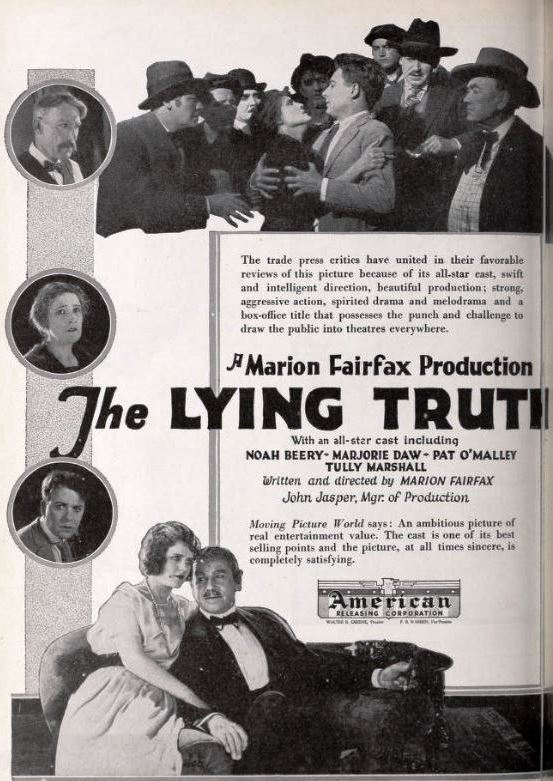
- Directed by: Marion Fairfax
- Written by: Marion Fairfax
- Produced by: Marion Fairfax
- Starring: Noah Beery; Marjorie Daw; Tully Marshall
- Cinematography: René Guissart
- Production companies: Eagle Producing Company; Marion Fairfax Productions
- Distributed by: American Releasing Corporation
- Release date: March 26, 1922
- Running time: 60 minutes
- Country: United States
- Languages: Silent; English intertitles

The Lying Truth is a 1922 American silent drama film written and directed by Marion Fairfax and starring Noah Beery, Marjorie Daw and Tully Marshall. It would be the first and only directorial outing for screenwriter Fairfax.

== Cast ==
- Noah Beery as Lawrence De Muidde
- Marjorie Daw as Sue De Muidde
- Tully Marshall as Horace Todd
- Pat O'Malley as Bill O'Hara
- Charles Hill Mailes as Sam Clairborne Sr
- Claire McDowell as Mrs. Sam Clairborne
- Adele Watson as Ellie Clairborne
- George Dromgold as Sam Clairborne
- Robert Brauer as Mose
- Wade Boteler as Bill O'Hara Sr

== Preservation ==
The Lying Truth is currently presumed lost. In February of 2021, the film was cited by the National Film Preservation Board on their Lost U.S. Silent Feature Films list.

== Bibliography ==
- Connelly, Robert B. The Silents: Silent Feature Films, 1910-36, Volume 40, Issue 2. December Press, 1998.
- Munden, Kenneth White. The American Film Institute Catalog of Motion Pictures Produced in the United States, Part 1. University of California Press, 1997.
