= Raymond Griffith =

American actor (1895–1957)

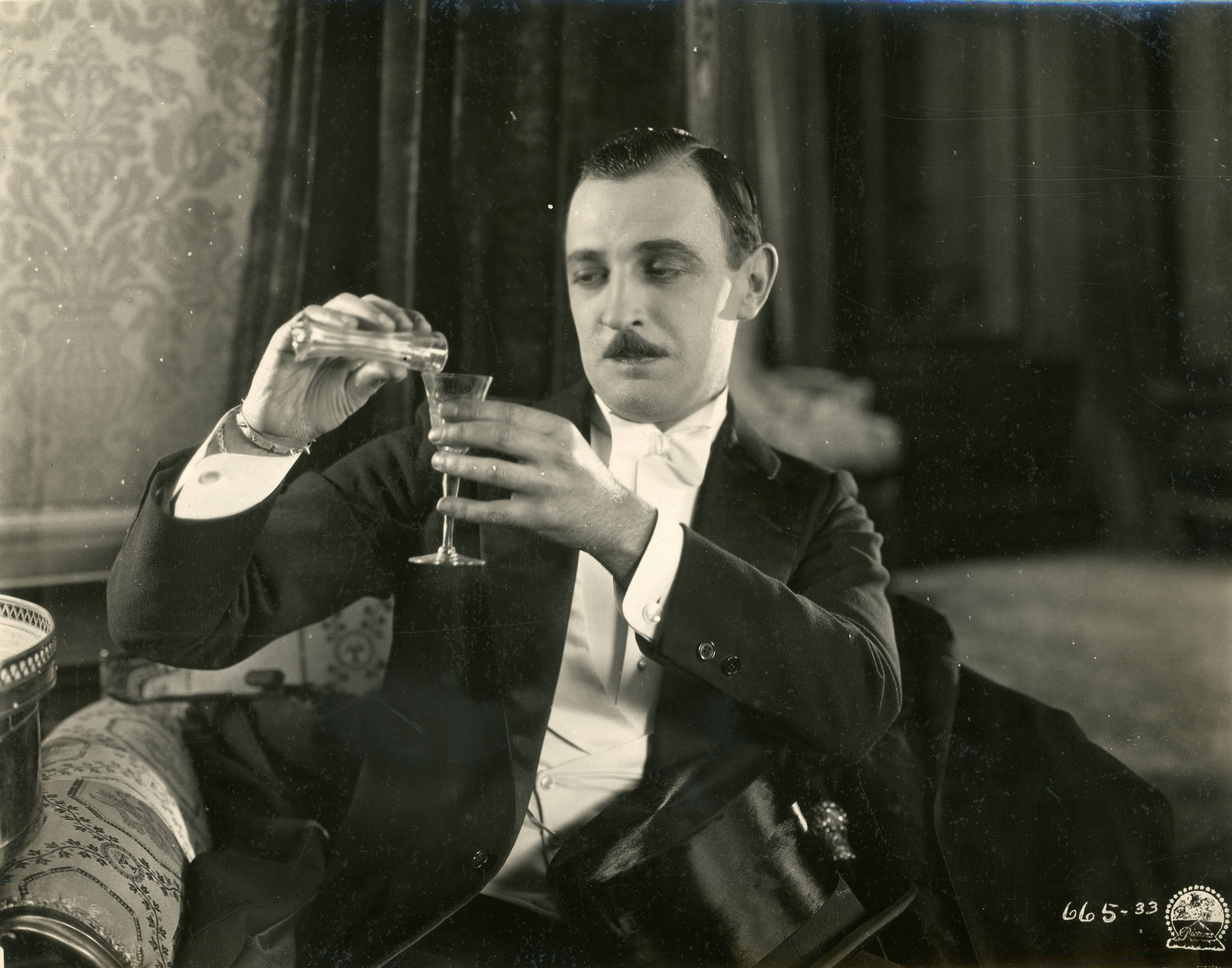
- Griffith in Open All Night (1924)
- Born: January 23, 1895; Boston, Massachusetts, U.S.
- Died: November 25, 1957 (aged 62); Los Angeles, California, U.S.
- Occupation: Actor
- Years active: 1918–1939
- Spouse: Bertha Mann (m. 1928)
- Children: 1 (adopted)

Raymond Griffith (January 23, 1895 – November 25, 1957) was an American silent movie actor and comedian. Later in his career, he worked behind the camera as writer and producer.

== Biography ==
Griffith was born in Boston, Massachusetts. He lost his voice at an early age, causing him to speak for the rest of his life in a hoarse whisper. Griffith claimed that it was the result of his having to scream at the top of his lungs every night in a stage melodrama as a child actor—others have stated that a childhood disease was more likely the cause. Lying about his age, Griffith enlisted in the U.S. Navy at age 15 and served for three years. He was later drafted for service in World War I but was not inducted because of his vocal problems.

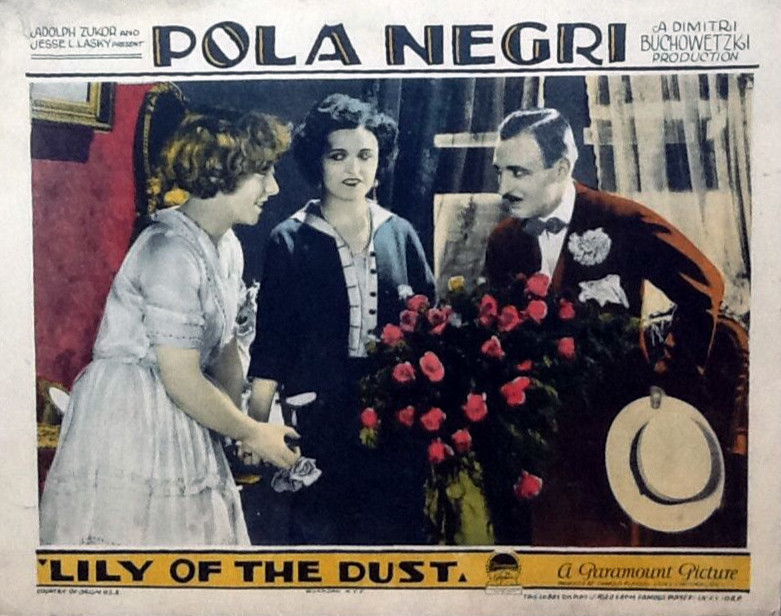
Lobby card with Jeanette Daudet, Pola Negri, and Griffith in Lily of the Dust (1924)

Although a few comedy films of his are considered classics he is almost totally forgotten today. His film debut was for the L-KO Kompany. Many of his starring feature films have long since been lost, but probably the best known of his films today is Hands Up! (1926), a Civil War comedy feature directed by Clarence G. Badger, and co-starring Mack Swain, which was entered into the National Film Registry in 2005. Also considered a classic is Badger's Paths to Paradise, a caper film that is in all circulating prints missing its final reel. Like many silent comedians, he had a traditional costume; his was a top hat, white tie and tails, often augmented by a cape and/or walking stick.

The coming of sound ended Griffith's acting career, but he did have one memorable role in a motion picture before retiring from the screen, playing a French soldier killed by Lew Ayres in the 1930 Lewis Milestone film All Quiet on the Western Front. He then segued into a writing/producing career at Twentieth Century Fox.

As of 1929, Griffith was a Socialist.

Griffith choked to death at the Masquers Club in Los Angeles, California, aged 62, on November 25, 1957.

== Filmography ==
Year	Title	Role	Notes
1918	The Red-Haired Cupid	Albert Jones	Lost film
1919	The Follies Girl	Fredric	
1920	Love, Honor and Behave	Man with Married Girlfriend	Lost film
1920	Down on the Farm		Writer
1922	The Crossroads of New York	Wall Street 'Wolf'	Lost film
1922	Fools First	Tony	Lost film
1922	Minnie	Chewing Gum Salesman	Lost film
1923	Red Lights	Sheridan Scott	Lost film
1923	The Eternal Three	Leonard Foster	
1923	The Day of Faith	Tom Barnett	Lost film
1923	White Tiger	Roy Donovan	
1923	Souls for Sale	Himself	
1924	Poisoned Paradise: The Forbidden Story of Monte Carlo	Martel aka The Rat	Incomplete film, five of seven reels are preserved
1924	The Dawn of a Tomorrow	The Dandy	Lost film
1924	Nellie, the Beautiful Cloak Model	Shorty Burchell	
1924	Changing Husbands	Bob Hamilton	
1924	The Yankee Consul		Writer
1924	Lily of the Dust	Karl Dehnecke	Lost film
1924	Open All Night	Igor	
1925	The Night Club	Robert White	
1925	Miss Bluebeard	The Honorable Bertie Bird	
1925	Forty Winks	Lord Chumley	Lost film
1925	Paths to Paradise	The Dude from Duluth	Incomplete film, final reel is missing
1925	Fine Clothes	Oscar	Lost film
1925	A Regular Fellow	The Prince	Lost film
1925	When Winter Went	Bookworm	
1926	Hands Up!	Jack - a Confederate Spy	
1926	Wet Paint	He	Lost film
1926	You'd Be Surprised	Mr. Green - The Coroner	
1926	The Waiter from the Ritz		
1927	Wedding Bills	Algernon Schuyler Van Twidder	Lost film
1927	Time to Love	Alfred Sava-Goiu	Lost film
1929	Trent's Last Case	Philip Trent	
1930	All Quiet on the Western Front	Gérard Duval	Uncredited, (final film role)
1933	Ladies They Talk About		Producer
1933	Broadway Through a Keyhole		Co-producer
1934	The House of Rothschild		Co-producer
1936	Private Number		Producer
1939	Hotel for Women		Producer
