= Don't Ever Marry =

1920 film directed by Marshall Neilan

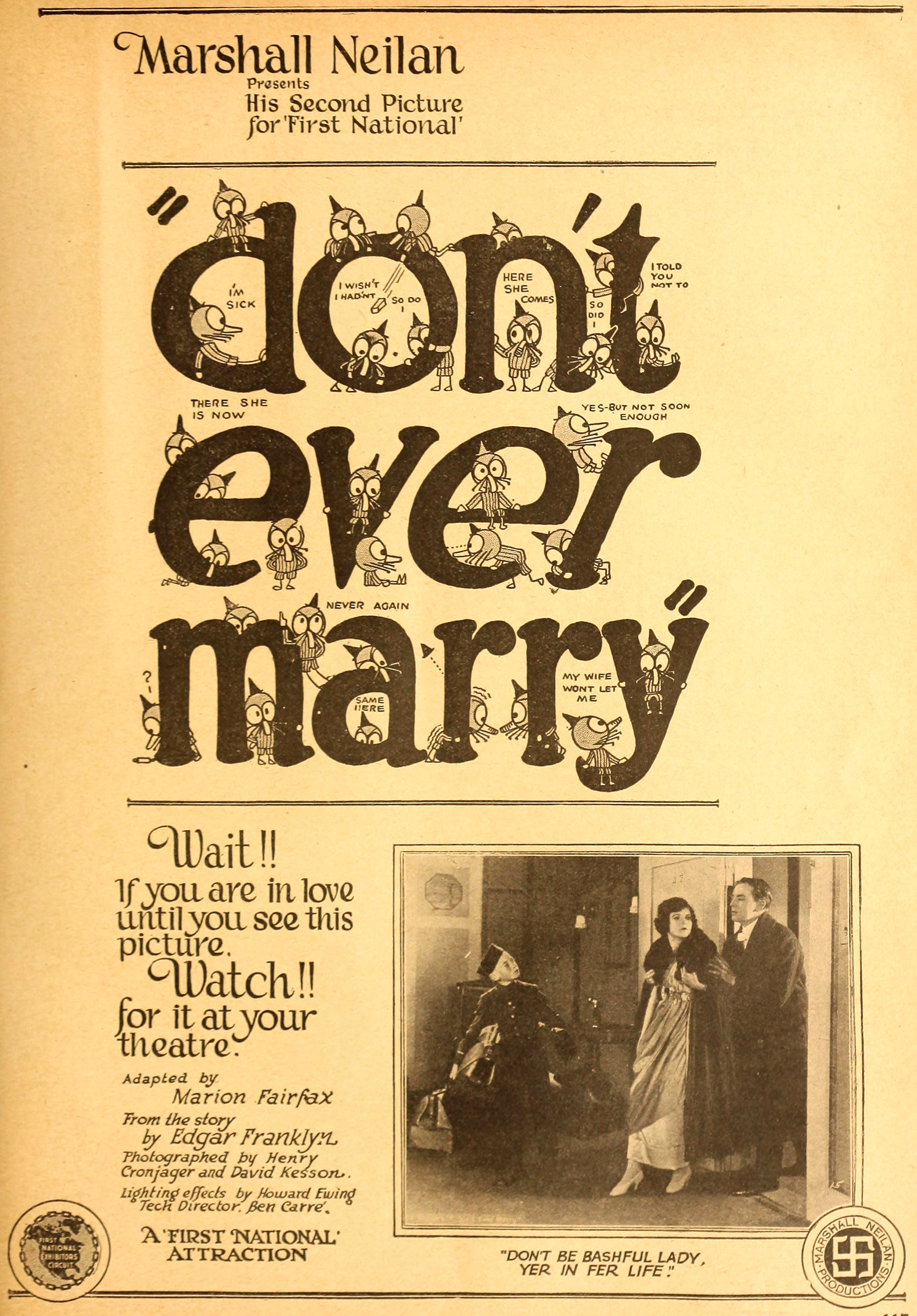
- Directed by: Marshall Neilan; Victor Heerman
- Screenplay by: Marion Fairfax
- Based on: Don't Ever Marry by Edgar Franklin
- Produced by: Marshall Neilan
- Starring: Matt Moore; Marjorie Daw; Thomas Jefferson; Mayme Kelso; Betty Bouton; Christine Mayo
- Cinematography: Henry Cronjager; David Kesson
- Production company: Marshall Neilan Productions
- Distributed by: First National Exhibitors' Circuit
- Release date: April 18, 1920
- Running time: 60 minutes
- Country: United States
- Language: English

Don't Ever Marry is a 1920 American silent comedy film directed by Marshall Neilan and Victor Heerman and written by Marion Fairfax. The film stars Matt Moore, Marjorie Daw, Thomas Jefferson, Mayme Kelso, Betty Bouton and Christine Mayo. The film was released on April 18, 1920, by First National Exhibitors' Circuit.

== Cast ==
- Matt Moore as Joe Benson
- Marjorie Daw as Dorothy Whynn
- Thomas Jefferson as Mr. Dow
- Mayme Kelso as Mrs. Dow
- Betty Bouton as Barbara Dow
- Christine Mayo as Myra Gray
- Herbert Standing as John Sitterly
- David Butler as Bill Fielding
- Wesley Barry as Bellhop
- Tom Wilson as House Detective
