= Hit-The-Trail Holliday =

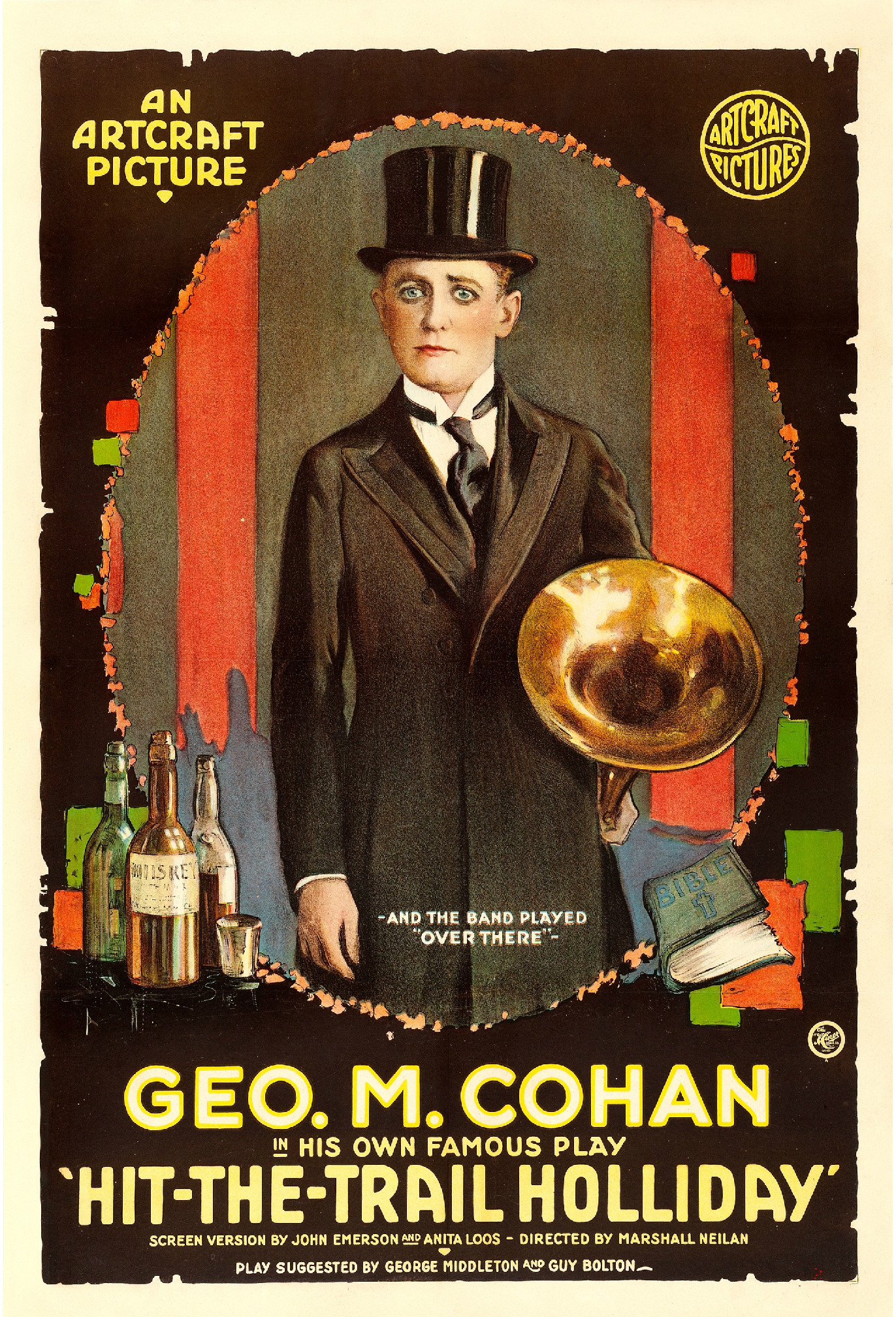
- Film poster
- Directed by: Marshall Neilan
- Written by: John Emerson; Anita Loos
- Based on: Hit-the-Trail-Holiday by George M. Cohan
- Produced by: Adolph Zukor; Jesse Lasky; George M. Cohan
- Starring: George M. Cohan
- Cinematography: Walter Stradling
- Distributed by: Paramount Pictures (as Artcraft Pictures)
- Release date: June 9, 1918
- Running time: 50 minutes
- Country: United States
- Language: Silent (English intertitles)

Hit-The-Trail Holliday is a lost 1918 silent comedy film directed by Marshall Neilan and starring George M. Cohan in filmization based on his 1915 Broadway play, Hit-the-Trail-Holiday (the spelling of the play differs from the film). Cohan wrote the play for his brother-in-law Fred Niblo, who was soon to become a film director. Cohan produced the film in conjunction with Famous Players–Lasky. A film about Prohibition of Alcohol, directed by one of Hollywood's then biggest alcoholics.

== Plot ==
As described in a film magazine, discharged because of his refusal to sell liquor to a minor, bartender Billie Holiday, expert mixer of drinks, seeks employment in St. Johnsburg, a small town dominated by two factions, one a German brewer, the other an American prohibitionist. Pretty Edith Jason strengthens Billy's leanings towards the prohibitionists, and in a rousing address he is successful in making a name for himself. Before long, accompanied by Edith who is now his wife, Billy makes a tour of various cities in an endeavor to wipe out the liquor interests.

== Cast ==
- George M. Cohan as Billie Holiday
- Marguerite Clayton as Edith Jason
- Robert Broderick as Otto Wurst
- Pat O'Malley as Kent B. Wurst
- Russell Bassett as Burr Jason
- Richard Barthelmess as Bobby Jason
- William Walcott as Reverend Holden

== See also ==
- The House That Shadows Built (1931 promotional film by Paramount); a possibility that the unnamed Cohan clip is from Hit-The-Trail Holliday.
- Prohibition in the United States
