= The Vagabond Lover =

1929 film by Marshall Neilan

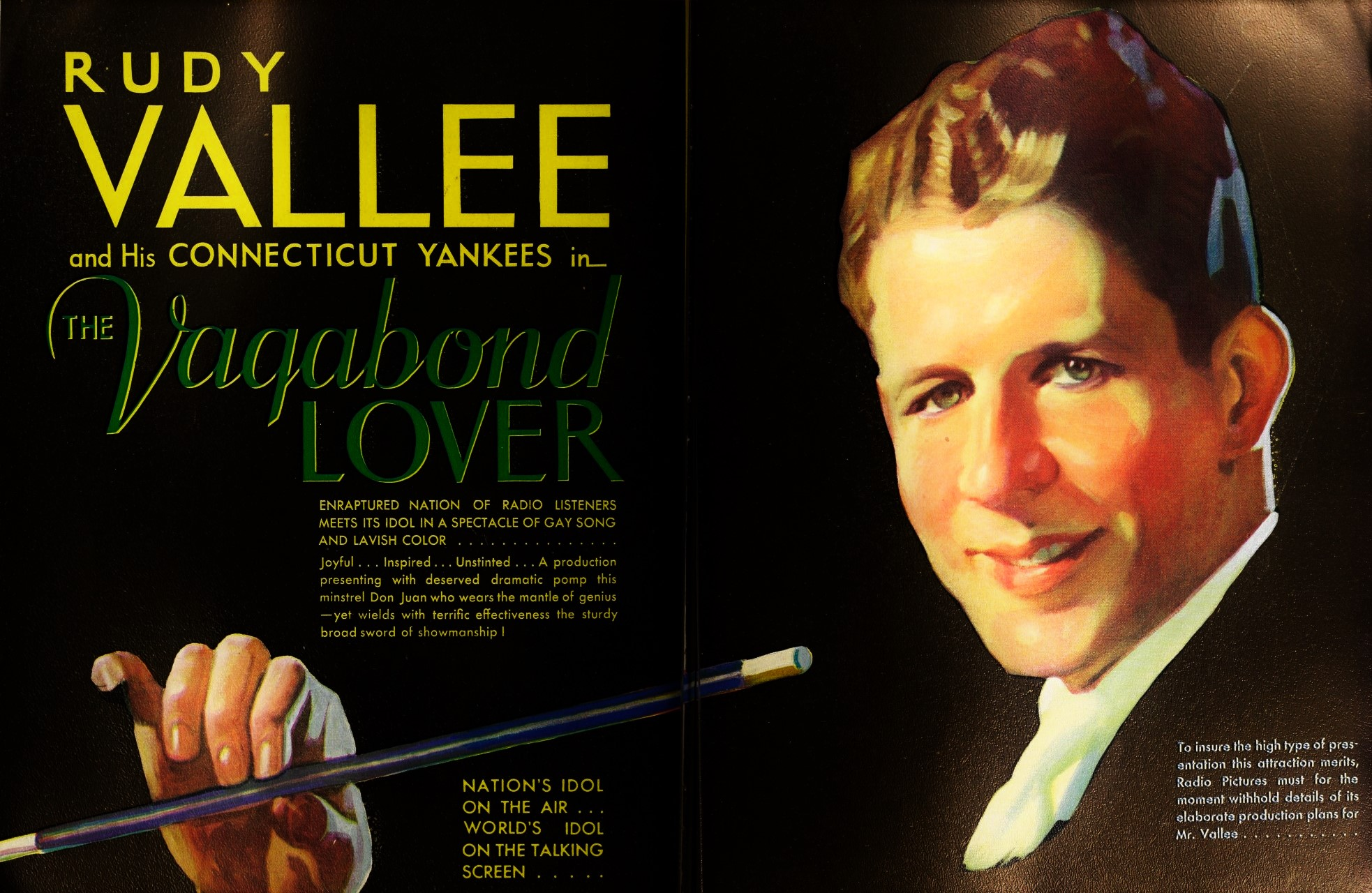
- Advertisement from Motion Picture News
- Directed by: Marshall Neilan
- Written by: James Ashmore Creelman
- Produced by: William LeBaron
- Starring: Rudy Vallee; Sally Blane; Marie Dressler; Charles Sellon
- Cinematography: Leo Tover
- Edited by: Arthur Roberts
- Music by: Victor Baravalle (music director); Harry M. Woods (songwriter)
- Distributed by: RKO Radio Pictures
- Release dates: November 26, 1929 (New York City); December 1, 1929 (United States)
- Running time: 65 minutes
- Country: United States
- Language: English
- Budget: $204,000
- Box office: $756,000

The Vagabond Lover is a 1929 American pre-Code black-and-white musical comedy-drama film about a small-town boy who finds fame and romance when he joins a dance band. The film was directed by Marshall Neilan and is based on the novel of the same name written by James Ashmore Creelman, who also wrote the screenplay. It stars Rudy Vallee, in his first feature film, along with Sally Blane, Marie Dressler and Charles Sellon.

The film premiered in New York City on November 26, 1929, and was released widely on December 1. A DVD version was released on March 29, 2005. The Vagabond Lover is an early example of a vehicle created for a popular music star, in a style echoed by later films such as Jailhouse Rock with Elvis Presley and A Hard Day's Night with the Beatles.

== Plot ==
Rudy Bronson is a senior in a small college in the Midwest who completes a correspondence course in the saxophone given by the nationally known Ted Grant. Bronson and his friends form a band but have difficulty finding work. Believing that Grant will help them land professional jobs, the band heads to his Long Island home. They pester Grant for an interview so relentlessly that Grant and his manager must escape to New York City until Bronson finally relents and returns home.

After Grant has left, his neighbor Mrs. Whitehall grows suspicious of the unknown young men hanging around his house. Thinking that they might be burglars, she calls the police. Whitehall and her niece Jean confront Bronson. Thinking quickly, one of Bronson's friends introduces him as Ted Grant, whom Whitehall has never met. The police are still suspicious, but when Bronson and his band play for them, they believe that he is Grant. Whitehall is so impressed that she hires Bronson's band to play at a charity concert.

As they are waiting for the day of the concert, Bronson and Jean become romantically involved, and the band becomes relatively successful. However, on the night before the charity event, Jean is upset to discover that Bronson has been impersonating Grant. Another socialite reports Bronson to the police, but before he can be arrested, Grant returns and claims credit for discovering Bronson and his band. The band becomes a great success, and Bronson is reconciled with Jean.

== Cast ==
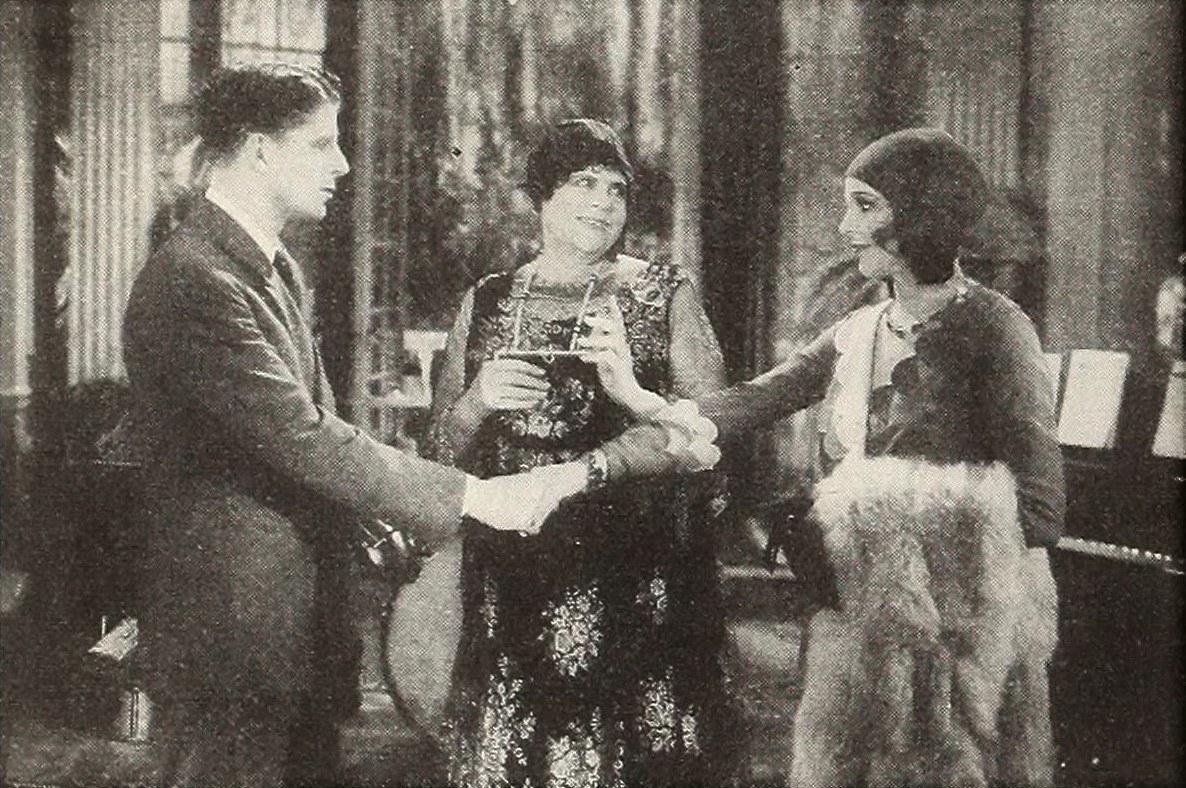
Rudy Vallee, Marie Dressler, and Sally Blane

- Rudy Vallee as Rudy Bronson
- Sally Blane as Jean Whitehall
- Marie Dressler as Mrs. Ethel Bertha Whitehall
- Charles Sellon as Officer George C. Tuttle
- Norman Peck as Swiftie
- Danny O'Shea as Sam
- Edward J. Nugent as Sport (as Eddie Nugent)
- Nella Walker as Mrs. Whittington Todhunter
- Malcolm Waite as Ted Grant
- Alan Roscoe as Grant's Manager
- The Connecticut Yankees as Musical Ensemble

== Soundtrack ==
- "I Love You, Believe Me, I Love You": Music by Ruby Cowan and Phil Boutelje, lyrics by Philip Bartholomae, played by the Connecticut Yankees, sung by Rudy Vallee
- "I'm Just a Vagabond Lover": Written by Rudy Vallee and Leon Zimmerman, sung by Rudy Vallee during the credits, also performed by the dance troupe at the benefit
- "Nobody's Sweetheart Now": Music by Billy Meyers and Elmer Schoebel, lyrics by Gus Kahn and Ernie Erdman, performed by the Connecticut Yankees
- "Georgie Porgie": Written by Billy Mayerl and Gee Paul, sung by a quartet of young orphans at the benefit
- "If You Were the Only Girl (In the World)": Music by Nat Ayer, lyrics by Clifford Grey, played by the Connecticut Yankees, sung by Rudy Vallee
- "Then I'll Be Reminded of You": Music by Ken Smith, lyrics by Edward Heyman, performed by the Connecticut Yankees, sung by Rudy Vallee
- "A Little Kiss Each Morning (A Little Kiss Each Night)": Written by Harry M. Woods, performed by the Connecticut Yankees, sung by Rudy Vallee
- "Sweetheart, We Need Each Other": Music by Harry Tierney, performed by the dance troupe at the benefit

Vallee's band, the Connecticut Yankees, made their film debut in The Vagabond Lover.

== Release ==
Vallee was angry after viewing the film's trailer, which contained the slogan, "Men Hate Him—Women Love Him." However, it was too late into production for it to be changed.

== Reception ==
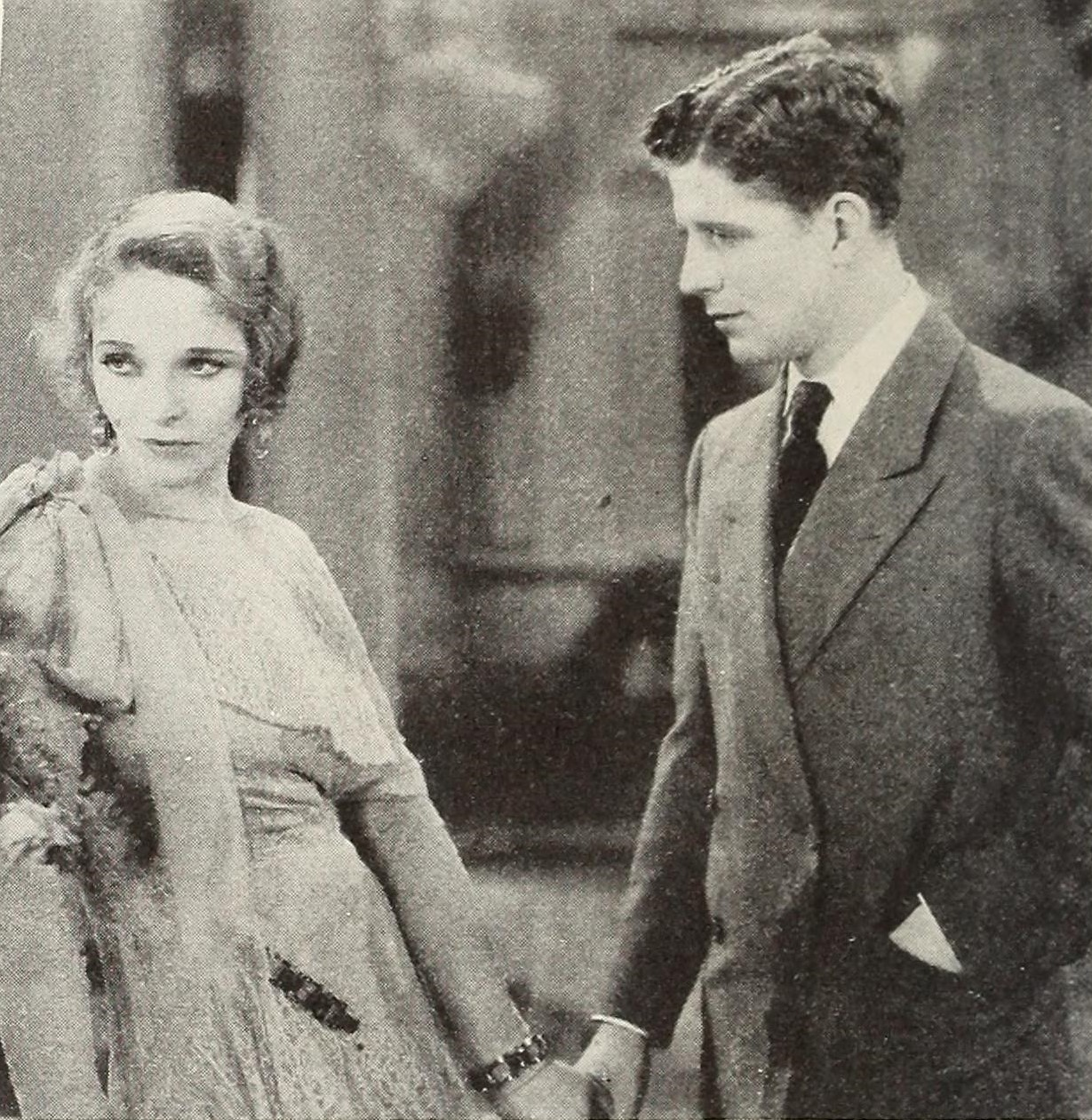
Rudy Vallee and Sally Blane

The film was a box-office success and returned a profit of $335,000. It was one of four top hits for RKO in 1929.

Mordaunt Hall of The New York Times wrote a positive review, noting that film "... relies on fun, tuneful songs and appealing music." He applauded Rudy Vallee's and Marie Dressler's performances, although he did have some negative points regarding the dialogue and was ambivalent regarding some of the acting.

A negative review was published in Motion Picture Magazine: "Once and for all, this movie should refute the theory apparently held by picture producers that a celebrity in any line is good movie material," the reviewer summed up. The reviewer did, however, praise Marie Dressler's performance and wrote in conclusion, "If you like sentimental songs that rhyme 'Moonbeams' with 'June-dreams,' you'll love the ones in 'The Vagabond Lover.'"

In Screenland, Delight Evans wrote: "It's true that the crooning lad of the radio has not quite mastered all of the celluloid technique, but you forget that when he sings," wrote . She concluded, "Marie Dressler romps away with a personal hit in hilarious comedy scenes. But it's Rudy's show, and when he sings you can let the rest of the world go by." The picture was given Screenland's Seal of Approval.

Reviewing the film for The Nation, Alexander Bakshy wrote: "[Rudy Vallée] gives his admirers what they long for—a succession of songs to the accompaniment of a jazz band which makes their hearts melt and fills their beings with a glow of 'romance.'"

Vallée did not like the film. In a 1980 interview he said: "They're still fumigating the theaters where it was shown. Almost ruined me. In fact, I think it's only shown in penitentiaries and comfort stations."

In his book The Speed of Sound: Hollywood and the Talkie Revolution, Scott Eyman wrote: "Neilan's The Vagabond Lover features the adenoidal singing and ungodly dance-band music of Ruby Vallee, who displays the preoccupied concern of a man trying to pass a kidney stone; his acting ability was of the sort usually found only in sixth-grade plays. Vallee makes Crosby look like Cagney and plays the kind of music that Spike Jones mercilessly parodied. It's the film of a director at a total loss; actors stumble over their lines but plow gamely ahead, and Neilan keeps the footage in the film. It might not all be Neilan's fault; the original negative of the film was burned in a studio fire, and the film survives today as reconstructed with outtakes."

== See also ==
- List of early sound feature films (1926–1929)
