= M'Liss (1918 film) =

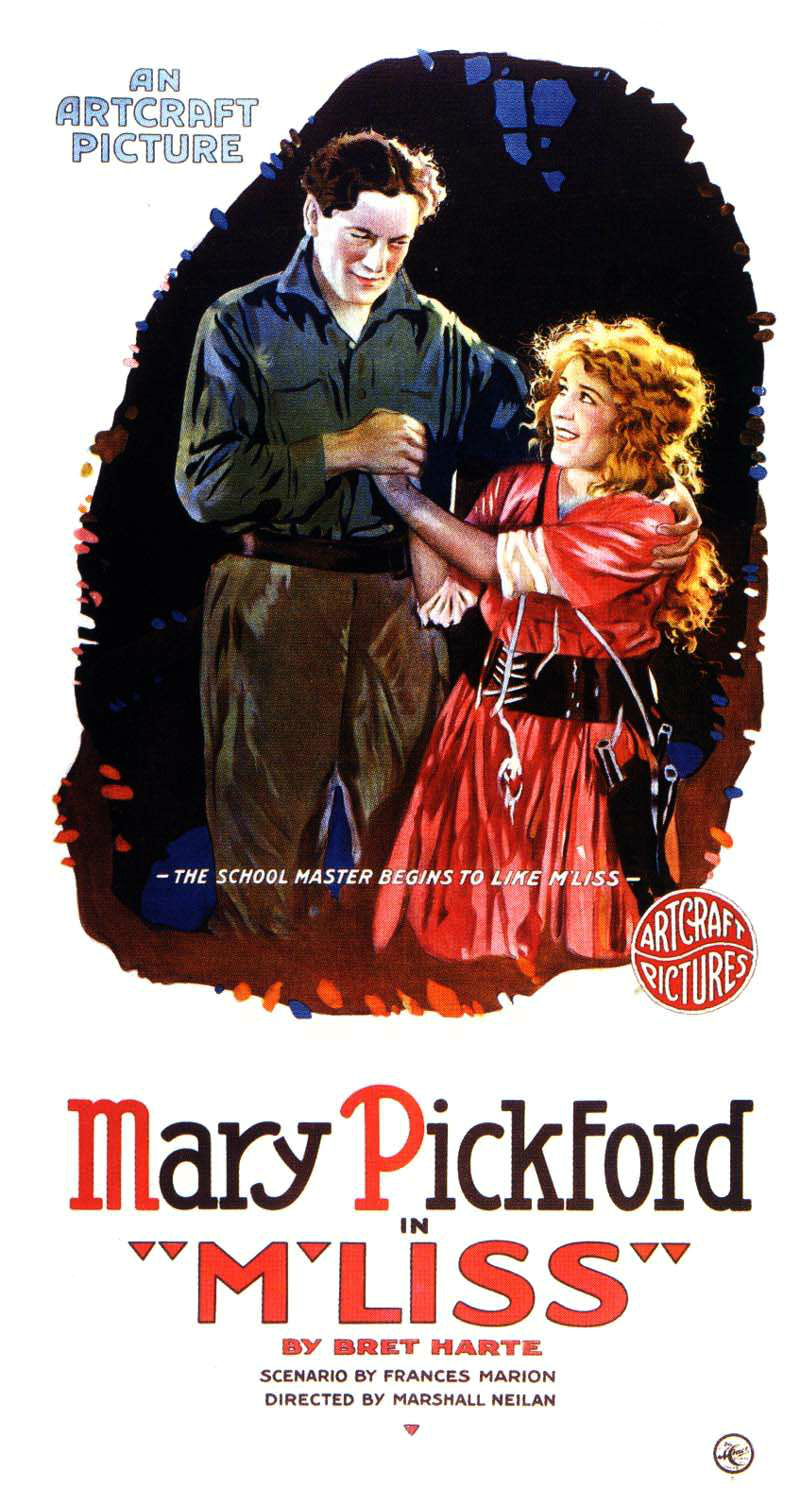
- Film poster
- Directed by: Marshall Neilan; Alfred E. Green (ass't director)
- Written by: Frances Marion
- Story by: Bret Harte
- Based on: M’liss: An Idyll of Red Mountain by Bret Harte
- Starring: Mary Pickford
- Cinematography: Walter Stradling
- Distributed by: Paramount Pictures
- Release date: June 5, 1918
- Running time: 73 minutes; 5 reels
- Country: United States
- Language: Silent (English intertitles)

M'Liss (1918)

M'Liss is a 1918 American silent comedy drama film directed by Marshall Neilan, written by Frances Marion and based on the 1863 novella M’liss: An Idyll of Red Mountain by Bret Harte. The film was made previously in 1915 and was remade again in 1922 as The Girl Who Ran Wild, starring Gladys Walton. Another same-titled remake was released in 1936, starring Anne Shirley.

== Plot ==
The film takes place in the mining town of Red Gulch in the High Sierra. M'Liss is one of the inhabitants whose father "Bummer" lost his fortune in the gold mines. Now his only investment, which pays a dividend, is his chicken Hildegarde. M'Liss regards herself as a crook and robs Yuba Bill's stage coach. Yuba, however, is fascinated by the young lady and does not mind. M'Liss is the only person in Bummer's life as his brother Jonathan, a wealthy pioneer, lives in San Francisco. One day, Jonathan turns his face toward the Sunset Trail. Clara Peterson has been his nurse for over three years and her brother Jim finds out they will receive $500 each for their services after his death. He is outraged they will get only that small amount of money.

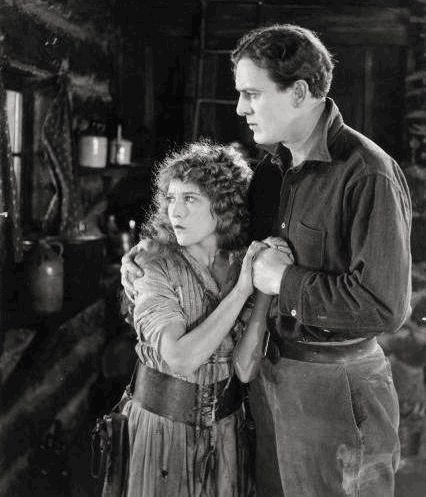
Mary Pickford and Thomas Meighan

Charles Gray is the school teacher who wants M'Liss to go to school as well. M'Liss isn't interested in an education. Charles keeps on pursuing her and she finally decides to go. He demands her to mind her manners when she's at school. She talks back to the boards members and is expelled. Charles, however, is charmed by the brave young girl. That same day, Bummer gets stabbed in the back by an unknown person. The sheriff suspects Charles, since he was the last person to visit Bummer.

When M'Liss is informed, she is crushed. She is invited to visit the murderer in jail and is shocked to find out it's Charles. Three weeks later, a murder trial starts. M'Liss is the only one believing in Charles' innocence. Clara Peterson reaches town to visit Bummer, finding him dead, she declares herself his long lost widow and asserts her claim to the will. M'Liss refuses to believe she is her mother. Finally, Charles is sent to jail for 60 years. M'Liss helps him escape, but the police follow him. M'Liss witnesses them shooting Charles, but does not know they went after the wrong guy and actually shot Jim. Jim and Mexican Joe, with the help of the sheriff, admit they killed Bummer for his will. The fortune now belongs to M’Liss, who reunites with a now free Charles.

== Cast ==
- Mary Pickford as Melissa 'M'liss' Smith
- Theodore Roberts as John Benson "Bummer" Smith
- Thomas Meighan as Charles Gray
- Tully Marshall as Judge Joshua McSnagley
- Charles Ogle as Yuba Bill
- Monte Blue as Mexican Joe Dominguez
- Winifred Greenwood as Clara Peterson
- Helen Kelly as Clytemnestra Veronica McSnagley
- Val Paul as Jim Peterson
- William H. Brown as Sheriff Sandy Waddles
- John Burton as Parson Bean
- Charles A. Post as Butch Saunders
- Guy Oliver as Snakebit Saunders

== Reception ==
Like many American films of the time, M'Liss was subject to cuts by city and state film censorship boards. For example, the Chicago Board of Censors required cuts, in Reel 5, of the intertitle "Say, sheriff, how about a little necktie party" and the scene of the sheriff looking up tree and dropping rope.
