= The Deadly Battle at Hicksville =

1914 film

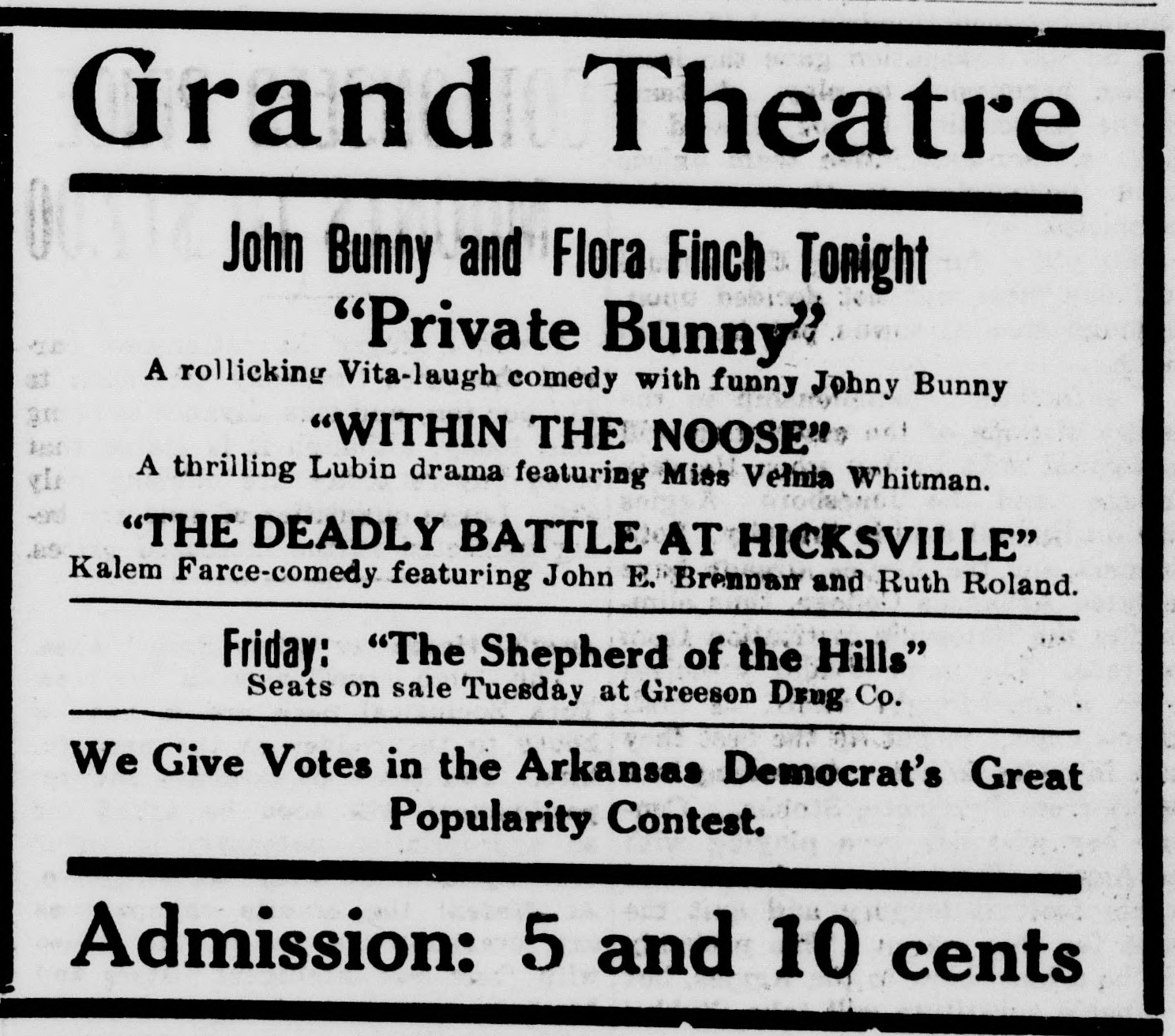
- Newspaper advertisement for The Deadly Battle at Hicksville and several other films
- Directed by: Marshall Neilan
- Story by: Marshall Neilan
- Starring: John E. Brennan; Ruth Roland; Lloyd Hamilton
- Production company: Kalem Company
- Distributed by: General Film Company
- Release date: July 31, 1914
- Running time: 1 reel
- Country: United States
- Languages: Silent film (English intertitles)

The Deadly Battle at Hicksville is a 1914 American silent short comedy film directed by Marshall Neilan and starring John E. Brennan, Ruth Roland, and Lloyd Hamilton. The film was released by General Film Company on July 31, 1914.

== Cast ==
- John E. Brennan as Jim
- Ruth Roland as Dolly - a Southern Belle
- Lloyd Hamilton as Dick - Jim's Rival

== See also ==
- List of American films of 1914
