= The Lotus Eater (film) =

1921 film by Marshall Neilan

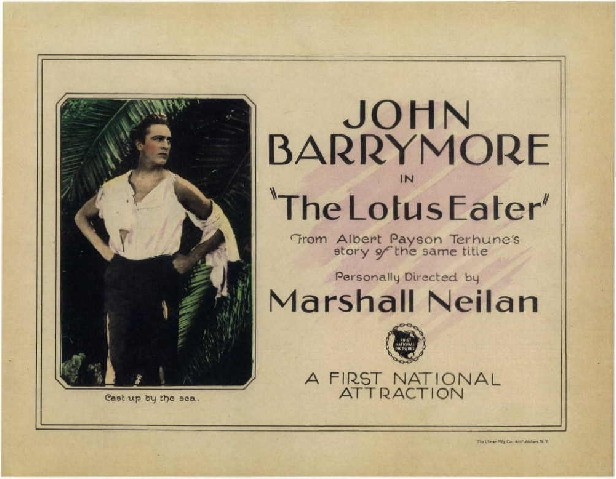
- 1921 lobby card
- Directed by: Marshall Neilan
- Written by: Marion Fairfax (scenario); George Ade (intertitles)
- Story by: Albert Payson Terhune
- Produced by: Marshall Neilan; John McCormick
- Starring: John Barrymore; Colleen Moore; Anna Q. Nilsson
- Cinematography: David Kesson
- Edited by: Daniel J. Gray
- Production company: Marshall Neilan Productions
- Distributed by: Associated First National
- Release date: November 21, 1921 (U.S.)
- Running time: 70 mins.
- Country: United States
- Language: Silent (English intertitles)

The Lotus Eater is a 1921 American silent romantic drama film produced and directed by Marshall Neilan and released through Associated First National. The film stars John Barrymore with Colleen Moore as the female lead. The Lotus Eater is now considered lost.

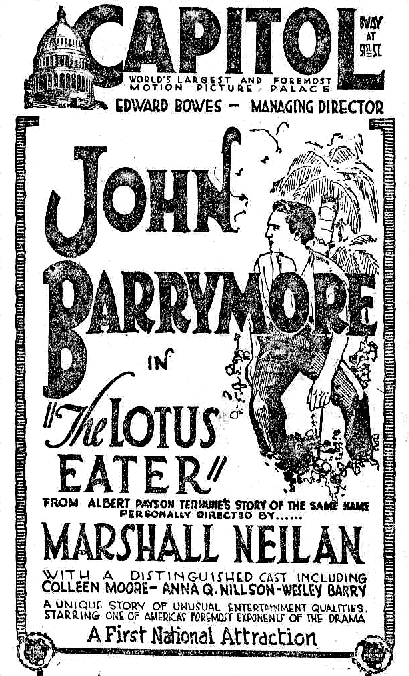
1921 New York City newspaper ad for the film.

== Plot ==
As described in a film magazine, raised aboard a ship, Jacques Leroi has never seen a woman until after the death of his father, a man who had been disappointed in love. As the only heir, the will stipulates that he is to remain on board until he reaches 25 years of age. On his 25th birthday, he arrives in New York City to consult his lawyer, and meets the gold-digging Madge Vance, who is being courted by John Carson. While off the coast of Florida on his yacht with Miss Vance, Jacques has the captain marry them and they go on a long cruise. Upon returning to New York City Jacques discovers that, according to the will, he will not inherit anything until he is 30 years old if he marries in haste. Madge then leaves him. Jacques becomes despondent, and agrees to attempt to cross the Pacific Ocean in a dirigible balloon with the patentee of a new form of gas. The blimp fails to rise above the air currents and he is forced to land on a small island. There he comes upon the strange occupants of the island, people who have been saved from various shipwrecks. They all wear Greek style clothing, eat at restaurants free of charge, and no one works. He falls in love with the native girl Mavis, but confesses that he has a wife and must return to the United States. The islanders loan him a boat, and he soon returns to New York City, where he discovers that Madge has become engaged to John Carson. Jacques and John await for Madge to keep an appointment only to receive word that she has eloped with a third man. Jacques is elated and returns to the island for the company of his beautiful native maiden.

== Cast ==
- John Barrymore as Jacques Leroi
- Colleen Moore as Mavis
- Anna Q. Nilsson as Madge Vance
- Ida Waterman as Mrs. Hastings Vance
- Frank Currier as The Dean
- Wesley Barry as Jocko
- J. Barney Sherry as John Carson
- Dorothy Mackaill

== Production ==
The film was shot in part in Florida, Marshall Neilan and his troupe having chartered a yacht in New York and sailing south.

Returning to New York after Florida, interiors for The Lotus Eater were shot at the old Biograph studio in the Bronx. Portions of the film were completed at Santa Catalina Island, though Barrymore was not there, as he was busy with the play Clair de Lune which had opened on April 18.

== See also ==
- List of lost films
