= The Eternal Three =

1923 film

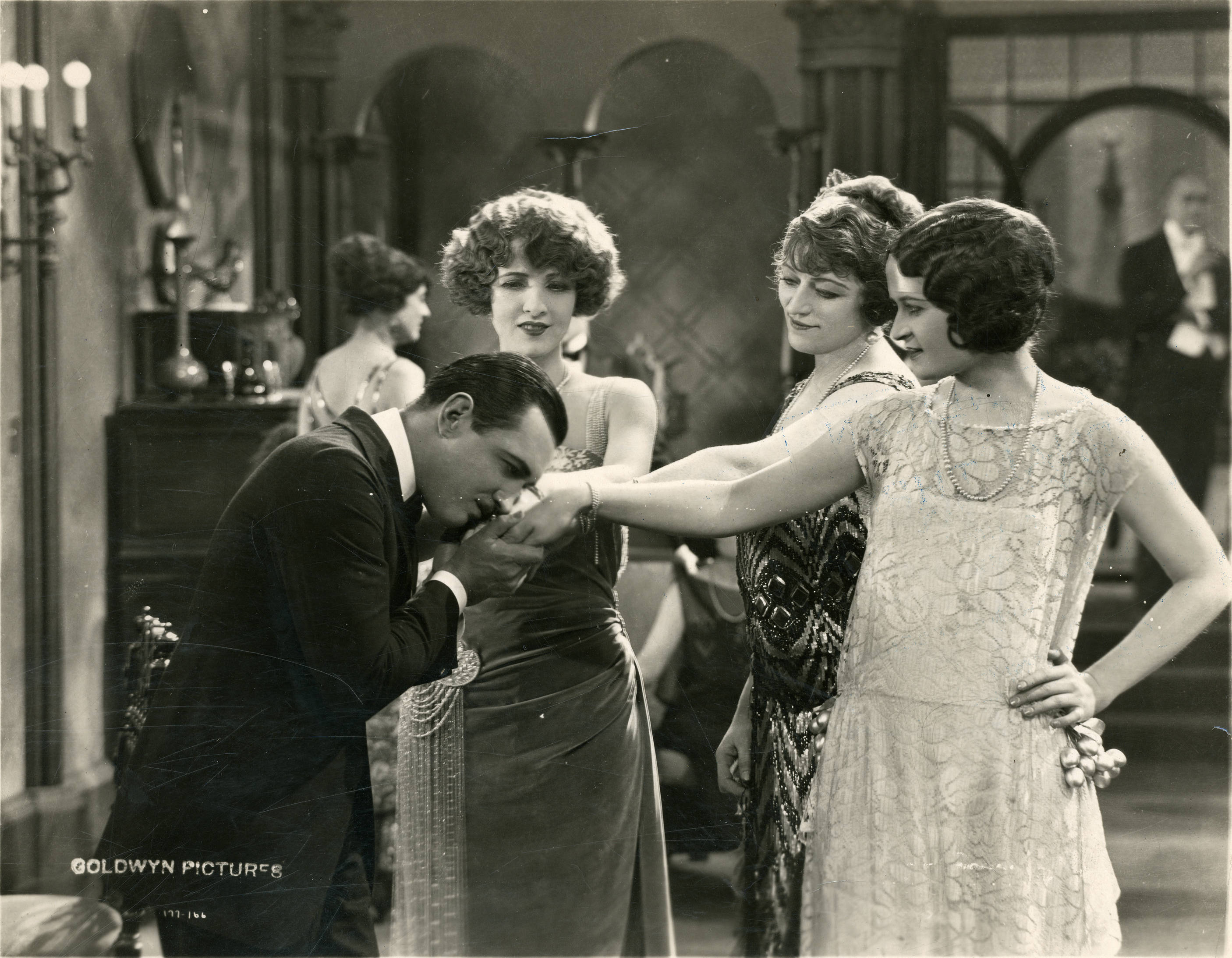
- Film still
- Directed by: Marshall Neilan; Frank Urson
- Written by: Marshall Neilan (story); Carey Wilson (scenario)
- Produced by: Samuel Goldwyn
- Starring: Hobart Bosworth; Claire Windsor; Raymond Griffith; Bessie Love
- Cinematography: David Kesson
- Production company: Goldwyn Pictures
- Distributed by: Goldwyn Pictures
- Release date: September 23, 1923 (U.S.)
- Running time: 7 reels; 6,708 feet
- Country: United States
- Language: Silent (English intertitles)

The Eternal Three is a 1923 American silent drama film produced and distributed by Goldwyn Pictures. It was directed by Marshall Neilan and Frank Urson. Hobart Bosworth, Claire Windsor, and Bessie Love star.

The film was made from a screen story by Neilan and a brief production scene of director Marshall Neilan with stars Raymond Griffith, Hobart Bosworth, and Claire Windsor appears in the restored film Souls for Sale.

== Plot ==
Dr. Frank R. Walters is a prominent brain surgeon whose career drives him to neglect his younger wife and foster son Leonard. Leonard seduces both his father's wife and secretary Hilda. When Leonard is injured in an automobile accident, his father operates on him, but then sends him away to Europe. Dr. Walters is resolved to spend more time with his wife.

== Cast ==
- Hobart Bosworth as Dr. Frank R. Walters
- Claire Windsor as Mrs. Frank R. Walters
- Raymond Griffith as Leonard Foster
- Bessie Love as Hilda Gray
- George Cooper as Bob Gray
- Tom Gallery as Tommy Tucker
- Helen Lynch as Miriam Barnes
- Alec B. Francis as Dr. Steven Browning
- William Orlamond as hacienda owner
- Charles West as butler
- Marion Aye as maid
- William Norris as old roué
- James F. Fulton as governor
- Irene Hunt as governor's wife
- Peaches Jackson as governor's child
- Victory Bateman as Mrs. Tucker
- Billie Bennett as Mrs. Tucker's friend
- Lillian Leighton as housekeeper

== Production ==
The snow scenes were filmed in Bryce Canyon City, Utah, and other scenes were filmed in Mexico City and Chapultepec.

== Reception ==
The film received mixed reviews.

== Preservation status ==
Prints are reportedly held at the EYE Film Institute Netherlands, the Academy Film Archive, and Lobster Films.
