= Bob Hampton of Placer =

1921 film

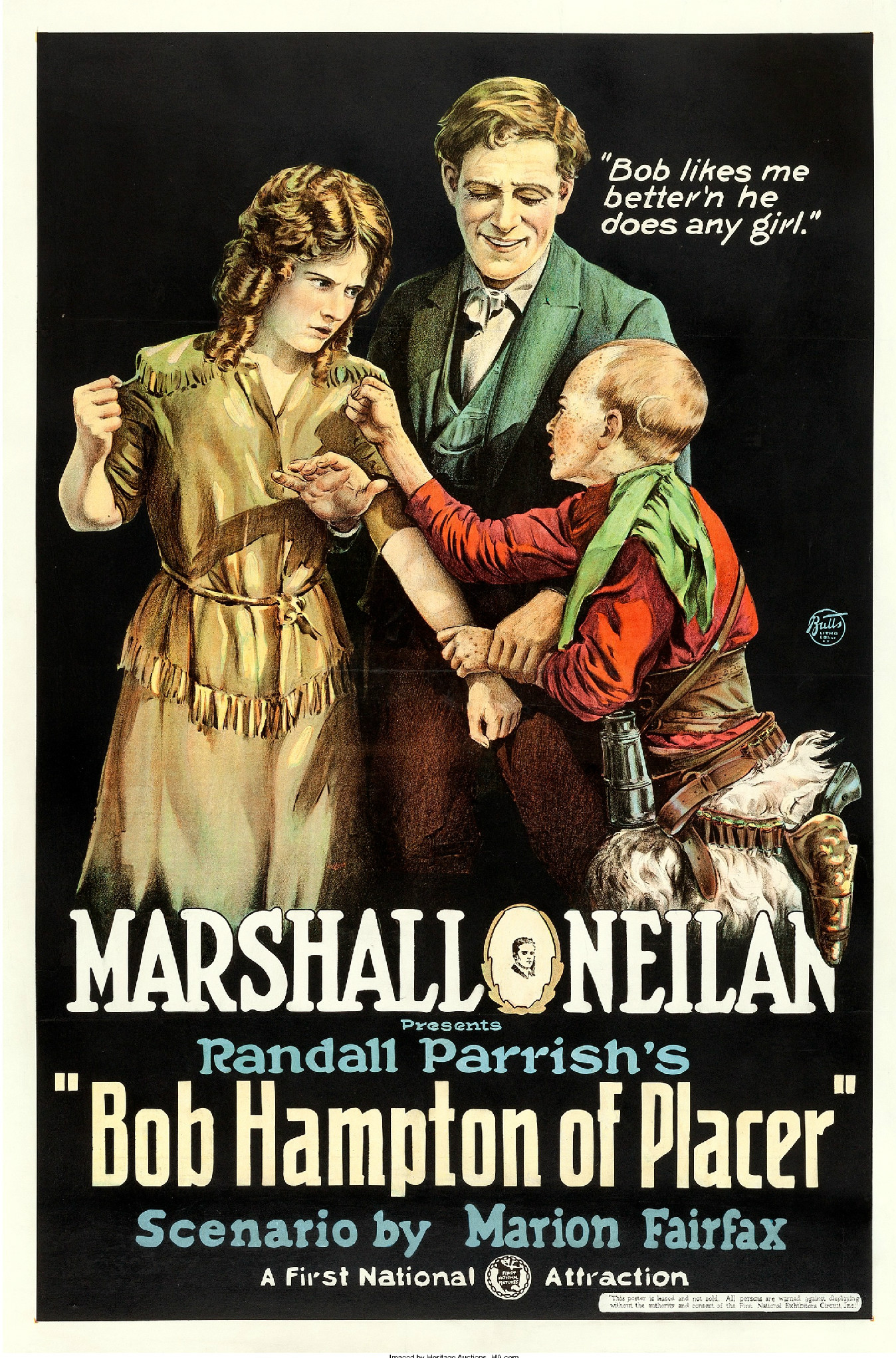
- Theatrical release poster
- Directed by: Marshall Neilan
- Screenplay by: Marion Fairfax
- Based on: Bob Hampton of Placer by Randall Parrish
- Produced by: Marshall Neilan
- Starring: James Kirkwood Sr. Wesley Barry; Marjorie Daw; Pat O'Malley; Noah Beery Sr. Frank Leigh
- Cinematography: Jacques Bizeul; David Kesson
- Production company: Marshall Neilan Productions
- Distributed by: Associated First National Pictures
- Release date: May 1, 1921
- Running time: 70 minutes
- Country: United States
- Language: Silent (English intertitles)

Bob Hampton of Placer is a 1921 American silent drama film directed by Marshall Neilan and written by Marion Fairfax. It is based on the 1910 novel Bob Hampton of Placer by Randall Parrish. The film stars James Kirkwood Sr., Wesley Barry, Marjorie Daw, Pat O'Malley, Noah Beery Sr., and Frank Leigh. The film was released on May 1, 1921, by Associated First National Pictures.

== Cast ==
- James Kirkwood Sr. as Bob Hampton
- Wesley Barry as Dick
- Marjorie Daw as The Kid
- Pat O'Malley as Lt. Brant
- Noah Beery Sr. as Red Slavin
- Frank Leigh as Silent Murphy
- T. D. Crittenden as Gen. Custer
- Tom Gallery as Rev. Wyncoop
- Priscilla Bonner as Schoolteacher
- Charles West as Maj. Brant
- Bert Sprotte as Sheriff
- Carrie Clark Ward as Housekeeper
- Victor Potel as Willie McNeil
- Charles A. Post as Jack Moffet

== Preservation ==
This film is currently lost.
