= Mike (1926 film) =

1926 film by Marshall Neilan

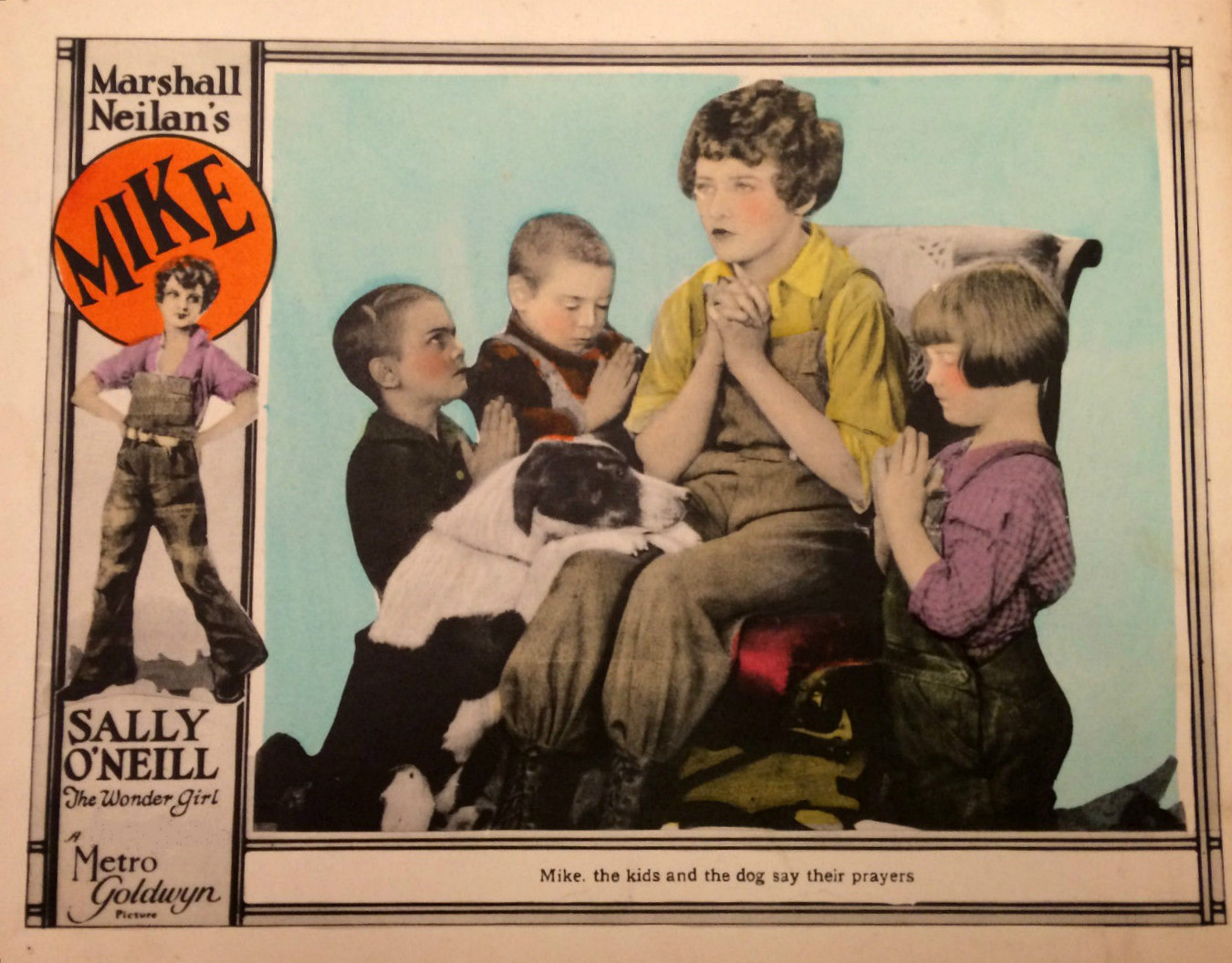
- Lobby card
- Directed by: Marshall Neilan
- Written by: Marion Jackson and Marshall Neilan
- Starring: Sally O'Neil; William Haines
- Cinematography: David Kesson
- Distributed by: Metro-Goldwyn-Mayer
- Release date: April 1926
- Running time: 70 minutes
- Country: United States
- Language: Silent (English intertitles)

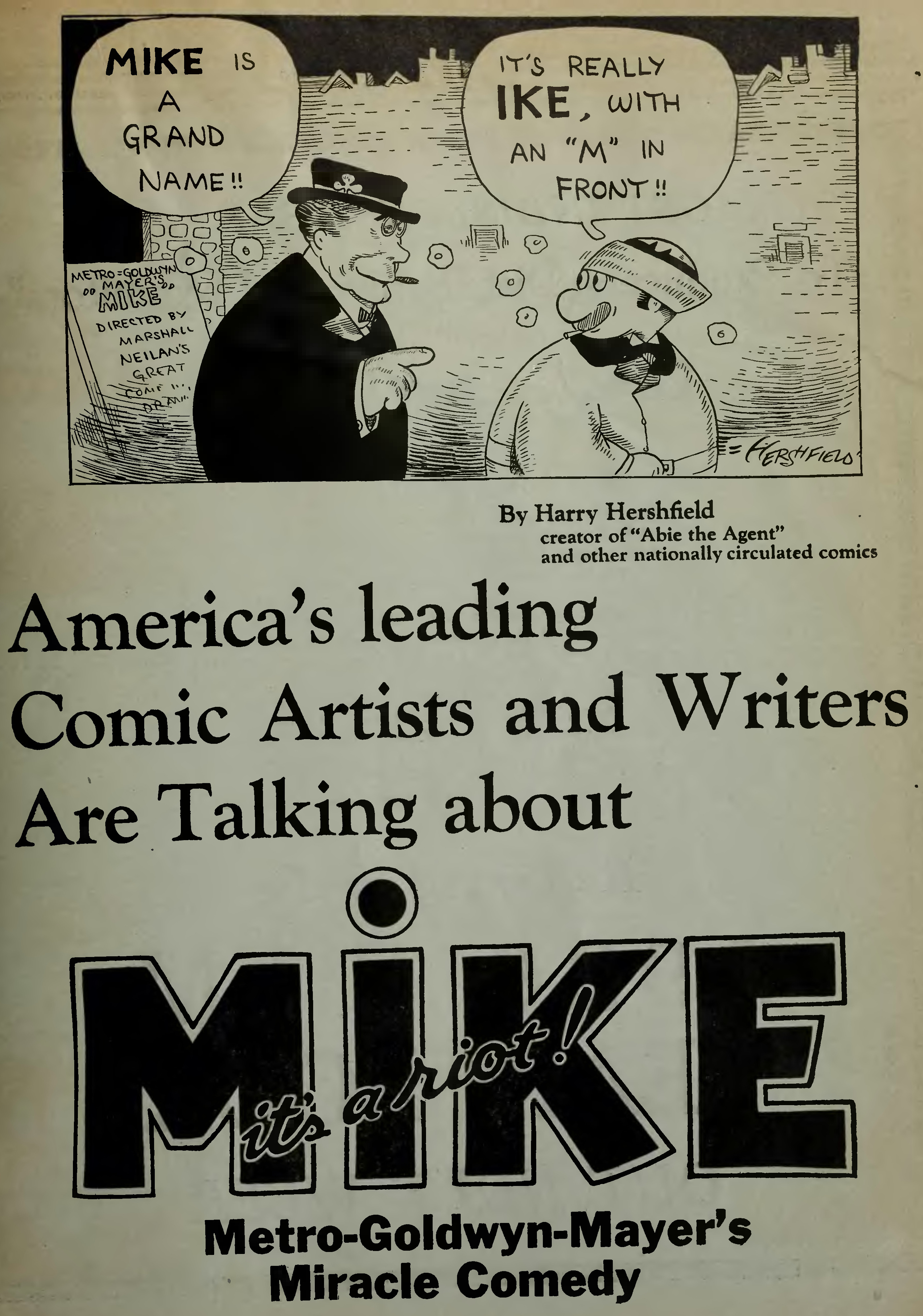
Mike ad in The Film Daily, 1926

Mike is a 1926 American silent comedy drama film directed by Marshall Neilan. The film is a modest production, featuring Sally O'Neil and William Haines.

== Plot ==
As described in a film magazine review, "Mike," a young woman, lives with her two brothers, sister, and father in an old freight car on a railroad siding in the desert. She enlists the aid of a circus manager from a nearby town to cure her father and his pal of drinking. Both swear off alcohol after seeing a vision of colored elephants and other beasts. Mike learns of a plot to hold up the Limited train. She and the children narrowly escape death when their freight car is sent wildly down grade. She tells her sweetheart Harlan, a telegraphist, of the bandits' scheme. The authorities are notified and the outlaws are captured.

== Cast ==
- Sally O'Neil as Mike (credited as Sally O'Neill)
- William Haines as Harlan
- Charles Murray as Father (credited as Charlie Murray)
- Ned Sparks as Slinky
- Ford Sterling as Tad
- Frankie Darro as Boy
- Frank Coghlan Jr. as Boy (credited as Junior Coghlan)
- Muriel Frances Dana as Girl
- Sam De Grasse as Brush

== See also ==
- List of early color feature films
