= Dinty (film) =

1920 film by Marshall Neilan

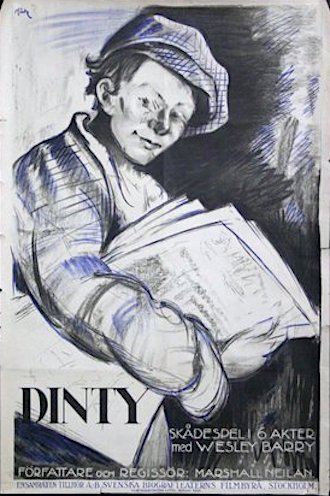
- Theatrical release poster
- Directed by: Marshall Neilan; John McDermott
- Screenplay by: Marion Fairfax
- Story by: Marshall Neilan
- Produced by: Marshall Neilan
- Starring: Wesley Barry
- Cinematography: David Kesson; Foster Leonard; Charles Rosher
- Edited by: Daniel Gray (film ed); Bessie Mason (cutter)
- Production company: Marshall Neilan Productions
- Distributed by: Associated First National Pictures
- Release date: November 29, 1920
- Running time: 73 minutes
- Country: United States
- Language: Silent (English intertitles)

Dinty

Dinty is a 1920 American silent comedy drama film written by Marshall Neilan and John McDermott specifically for Wesley Barry, a young actor known for his freckled complexion. Prominent among the supporting players were Colleen Moore, Marjorie Daw, Pat O'Malley, and Noah Beery.

Together with the African American Aaron Mitchell and the Chinese-American Walter Chung, Barry creates the prototype of the multi-ethnic baby gang which will serve as a model for the successful series of Our Gang (1922–44) and in other feature films like Little Annie Rooney (1925) with Mary Pickford.

The film is extant, archived in the Filmmuseum in Amsterdam.

== Plot ==
In a village in the Irish woods, young Doreen Adair falls in love with a young man, Danny O'Sullivan. One day, Danny receives notice that he is offered a job in America. Before leaving, he marries Doreen. A year later, a son is born, and Doreen decides to follow her husband to America. Upon arriving in San Francisco from Ireland, Doreen discovers through Danny's landlady Mrs. O'Toole that her husband has been killed in a car accident.

To support herself and her infant son Dinty, Doreen labors night shifts as a scrub woman until, at the age of twelve, Dinty becomes the family's breadwinner by selling newspapers, forming his own street gang with other children. Doreen, meanwhile, suffers from tuberculosis and gets weaker by the day.

Meanwhile, in Chinatown, when Judge Whitely imprisons the son of opium smuggler Wong Tai, Wong Tai retaliates by kidnapping the judge's daughter. Dinty, whose work as a newsboy has familiarized him with the Chinese underworld, leads police to Wong Tai's hideout and saves the judge's daughter from a bizarre death by torture. As Dinty's mother has succumbed to tuberculosis, the grateful Judge Whitely adopts Dinty.

== Cast ==
Colleen Moore, as Doreen O'Sullivan, on her way to America with the infant Dinty

Colleen Moore in a still from the film

- Wesley Barry as Dinty O'Sullivan
- Colleen Moore as Doreen O'Sullivan
- Tom Gallery as Danny O'Sullivan
- J. Barney Sherry as Judge Whitely
- Marjorie Daw as Ruth Whitely
- Pat O'Malley as Jack North
- Noah Beery as Wong Tai
- Walter Chung as Sui Lung
- Kate Price as Mrs. O'Toole
- Tom Wilson as Barry Flynn
- Aaron Mitchell as Alexander Horatius Jones
- Young Hipp as Wong Tai's son

== Production ==
In an earlier film, Go and Get It (1920), Barry played a supporting role as a paperboy named "Dinty". Neilan used the character to create a story in a similar vein as a starring vehicle for Barry, who was being groomed by the studio.

Moore, on loan from Christie Film Company, would sign a lucrative contract with Neilan when production for Dinty was completed. Anna May Wong appeared in an uncredited role that also led to more work with Neilan; after Dinty, he created a role for her in Bits of Life for which she earned her first screen credit.

Portions of the film were shot on location in San Francisco including Chinatown and Adolph B. Spreckels' Spreckels Mansion. The end of the film was shot on location on Catalina Island. Sets were designed by Ben Carré.

== Release ==
Released November 29, 1920, Dinty was successful. A booklet on Wesley Barry's life was put out concurrently, part of the movie's promotional strategy. Neilan also used the release of Dinty to debut a campaign to improve the artistic quality of film stills.

Reviews of the film were generally favorable. The Dramatic Mirror called it "a photoplay of remarkable direction, excellent acting ... and perfect photography". The reviewer for Motion Picture News wrote: "There are enough elements in this feature to please every type of picturegoer." Positive reviews appeared in trade papers Variety, Wid's, and the Exhibitors Herald.

Some of the positive reviews were conditional. The Photoplay reviewer commented that Neilan's "human touch ... however obvious and conventional it may become, is usually effective". The New York Times critic noted the "deliberateness" that led to a deficiency in "genuineness", especially in the dramatic and action scenes.
