= The Secret Game =

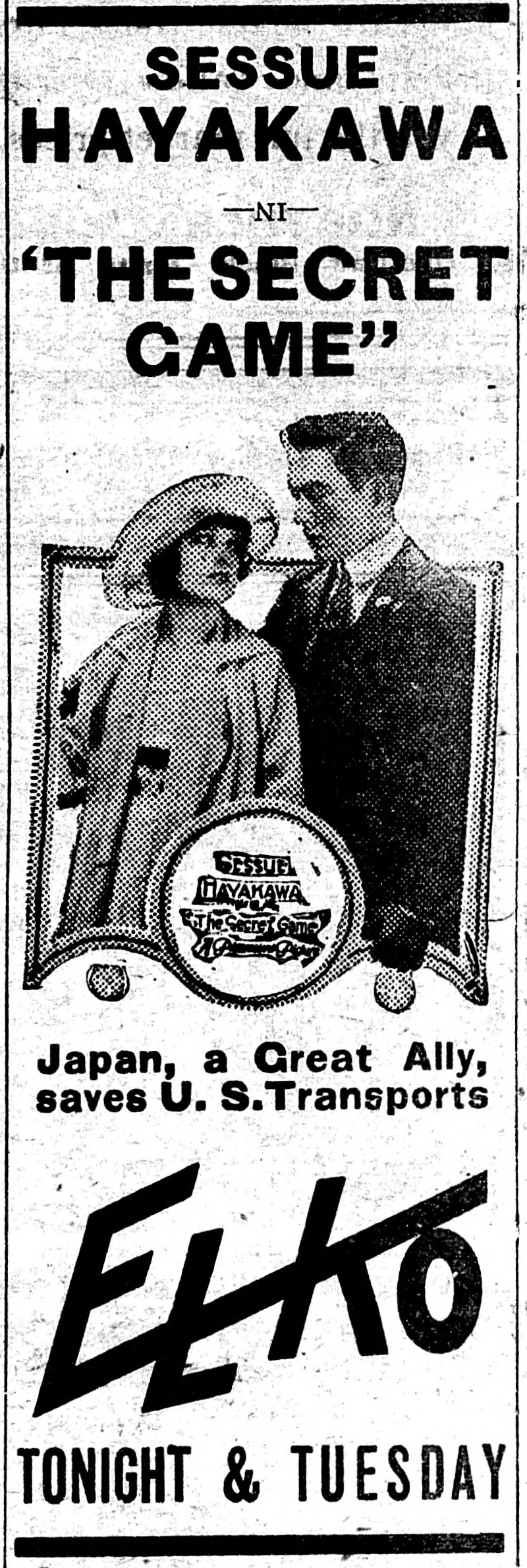
- Newspaper advertisement.
- Directed by: William C. deMille; Harry Haskin (ass't director)
- Written by: Marion Fairfax (story, scenario)
- Produced by: Jesse L. Lasky
- Starring: Sessue Hayakawa
- Cinematography: Charles Rosher
- Distributed by: Paramount Pictures
- Release date: December 3, 1917
- Running time: 5 reels
- Country: United States
- Language: Silent (English intertitles)

The Secret Game is a surviving 1917 American silent drama film produced by Jesse L. Lasky and released through Paramount Pictures. It was directed by William C. deMille and starred Sessue Hayakawa. It survives complete at the Library of Congress and was released on DVD.

== Plot ==
The Secret Game (1917)

As described in a film magazine, Kitty Little, a German spy under the direction of Dr. Ebell Smith, is employed by Major John Northfield. The spies are anxious to obtain information on the sailing dates of transport ships. Nara-Nara, a clever Japanese spy, is on the trail of the German spies and suspects Northfield of dishonesty. However, a letter makes him suspect Kitty, whom he has grown to love. Northfield, who also loves Kitty and also suspects her, as a test gives her a blank letter which he tells her to mail as it contains transport sailing dates. Kitty takes the letter to Smith. Nara-Nara follows and in a struggle kills Smith. He then endeavors to force Kitty to go away with him, but she reminds him of his ambition to keep his sword clean and he leaves her. While going to examine the body of Smith, Nara-Nara is killed by one of Smith's accomplices. Northfield comes to Kitty, who is in receipt of a letter from her brother in the German trenches that states he is to be shot for shielding women and children. Kitty becomes a true American and the fiancé of Northfield.

== Cast ==
- Sessue Hayakawa as Nara-Nara
- Jack Holt as Major John Northfield
- Florence Vidor as Kitty Little
- Mayme Kelso as Miss Loring
- Raymond Hatton as 'Mrs. Harris'
- Charles Ogle as Dr. Ebell Smith
