= Minnie (film) =

1922 film by Marshall Neilan

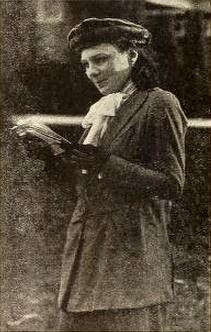
- Still with Leatrice Joy
- Directed by: Marshall Neilan; Frank Urson
- Written by: Marshall Neilan (scenario); Frances Marion (titles)
- Story by: George Patullo
- Produced by: Marshall Neilan
- Starring: Leatrice Joy
- Cinematography: David Kesson; Karl Struss
- Edited by: Daniel J. Gray
- Distributed by: Associated First National
- Release date: December 1, 1922 (United States)
- Running time: 70 minutes
- Country: United States
- Language: Silent (English intertitles)

Minnie is a 1922 American silent comedy film starring Leatrice Joy and co-directed by Marshall Neilan and Frank Urson. Neilan also wrote and produced the film which was released by Associated First National Pictures (later First National Pictures). It is not known whether the film currently survives, which suggests that it is a lost film.

== Plot ==
As described in a film publication, Minnie, the homeliest girl in town, is devoted to her father, a discouraged inventor who has been working on a wireless device. Subject to the sneers of her neighbors, Minnie "invents" a lover and sends herself letters and flowers. Her stepsister suspects the truth and threatens to expose her. Desperate, she claims an unidentified body at the morgue and tells a reporter that this is her lover, unaware that the body is that of a Chinese man. The absent-minded reporter sees her heart and forgets about the big story. After further disappointments in the invention, Minnie's stepmother decides to leave her father. Her father then has a success and becomes rich. At a celebration, the stepsister and townspeople are surprised when a new couple appear, which turn out to be the former reporter and his lovely wife Minnie.

== Cast ==
- Leatrice Joy as Minnie
- Matt Moore as Newspaperman
- George Barnum as Minnie's Father
- Josephine Crowell as Stepmother
- Helen Lynch as Stepsister
- Raymond Griffith as Chewing Gum Salesman
- Richard Wayne as Young Doctor
- Tom Wilson as Boardinghouse Janitor
- George Dromgold as Local Cut-Up
