= The Great Love (1925 film) =

1925 film

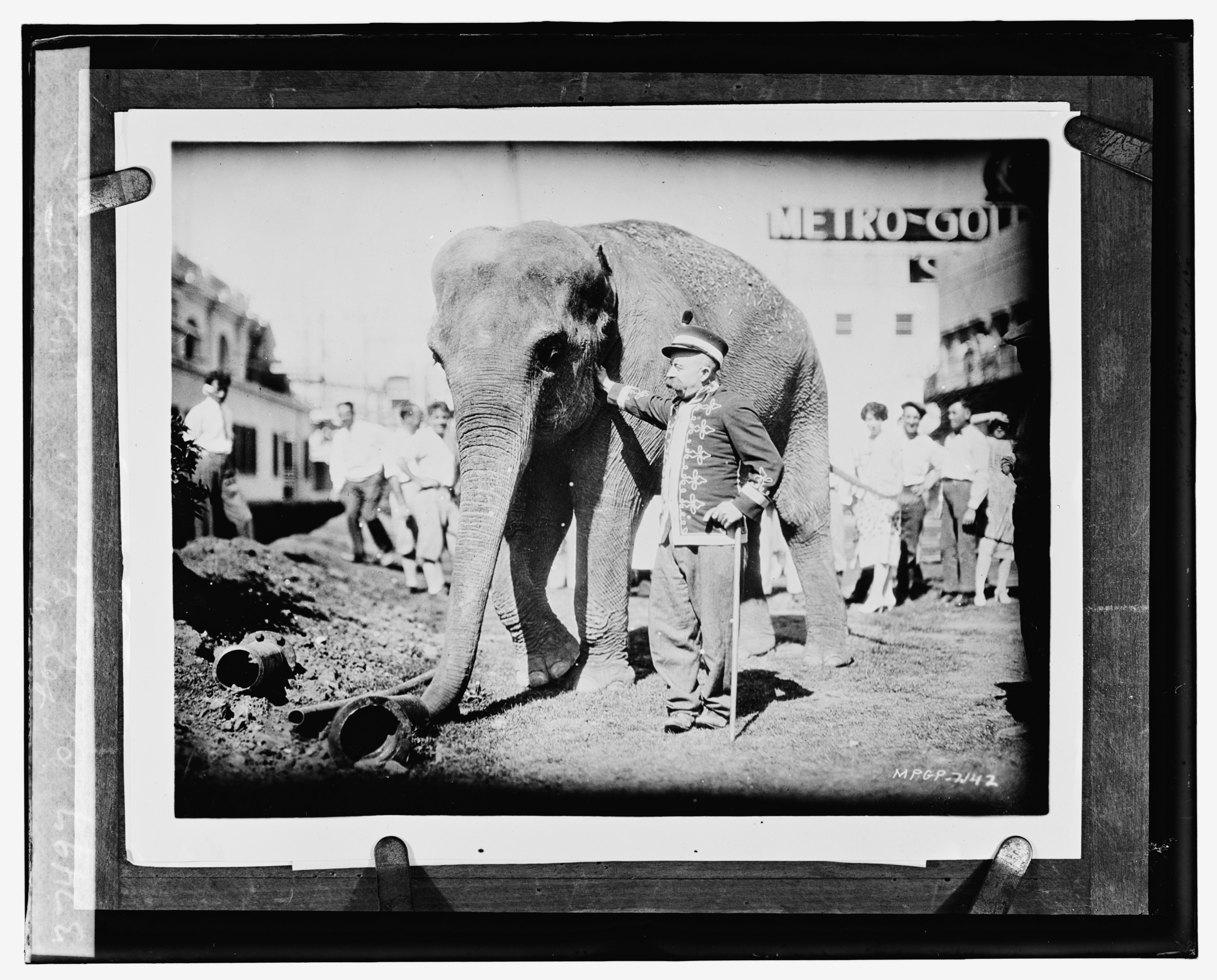
- Still with Chester Conklin and Norma the elephant
- Directed by: Marshall Neilan
- Written by: Benjamin Glazer and Marshall Neilan
- Starring: Robert Agnew; Viola Dana; ZaSu Pitts
- Distributed by: Metro-Goldwyn-Mayer
- Release date: December 27, 1925
- Running time: 1 hour
- Country: United States
- Language: Silent (English intertitles)

The Great Love is a lost 1925 American silent comedy film directed by Marshall Neilan based upon his own story, scripted by Benjamin Glazer. The film stars Robert Agnew, Viola Dana, and ZaSu Pitts.

== Plot ==
As described in a film magazine review, Dr. Lawrence Tibbits, a struggling young doctor in a rural community, gets a big fee for curing Norma, a circus elephant who was injured in a fire. Later Norma causes him considerable trouble, as she constantly breaks loose and seeks her benefactor, destroying property en route. Tibbits' rival for the love of Minette Bunker kidnaps the latter. Tibbits goes to her rescue, aided by Norma and an army of Boy Scouts. When his automobile runs out of fuel, Tibbits rides Nora to the shack where Minette is being held. Minette is saved and all ends happily.

== Cast ==
- Robert Agnew as Dr. Lawrence Tibbits
- Viola Dana as Minette Bunker
- Frank Currier as Mr. Bunker
- ZaSu Pitts as Nancy
- Chester Conklin as Perkins
- Frank Coghlan, Jr. as Patrick (credited as Junior Coughlan)
- Malcolm Waite as Tom Watson

== Preservation ==
With no prints of The Great Love located in any film archives, it is a lost film.
