= Go and Get It =

1920 film by Marshall Neilan

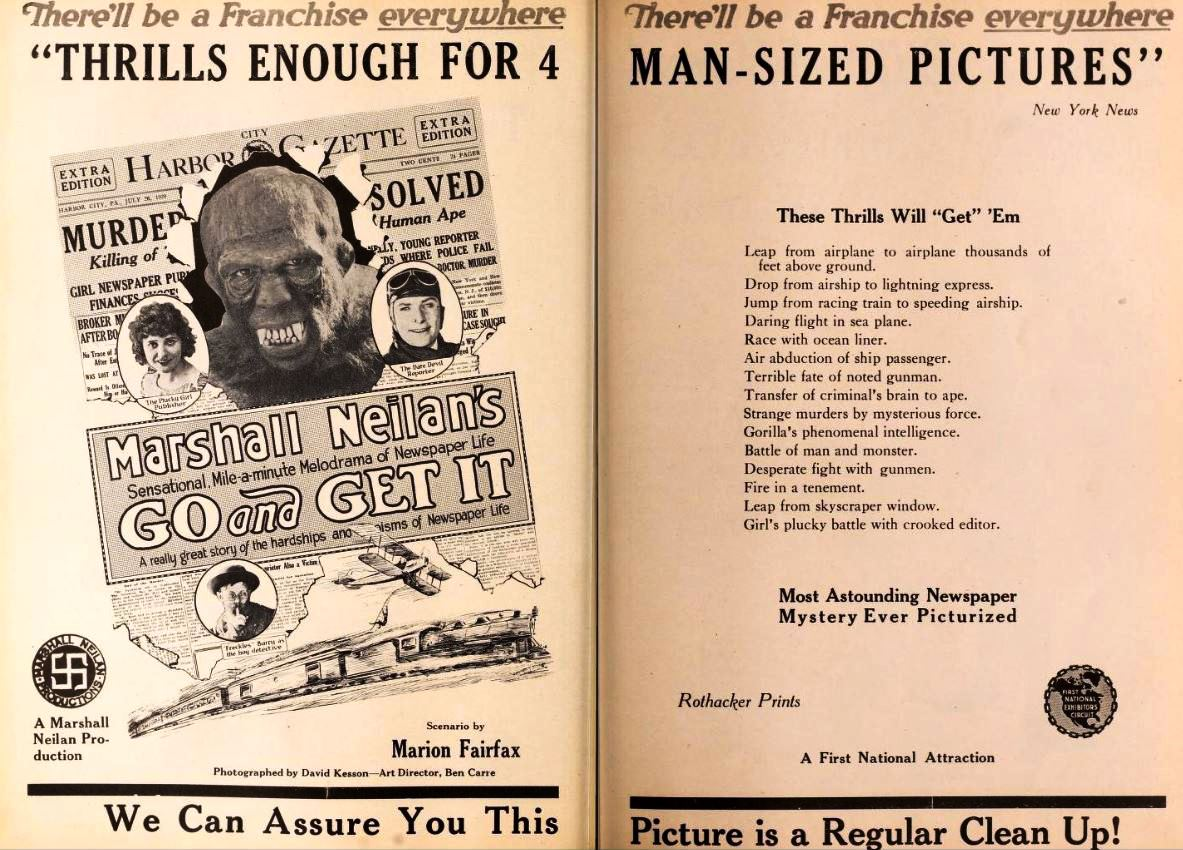
- Advertising for Go and Get It on pages 22 and 23 of the Exhibitors Herald (August 1920).
- Directed by: Marshall Neilan; Henry Roberts Symonds
- Written by: Marion Fairfax
- Produced by: Marshall Neilan
- Starring: Pat O'Malley; Wesley Barry; Agnes Ayres
- Cinematography: David J. Kesson
- Production company: Marshall Neilan Productions
- Distributed by: First National Exhibitors' Circuit
- Release date: July 18, 1920
- Running time: 70 minutes
- Country: United States
- Languages: Silent film (English intertitles)

Go and Get It is a 1920 American silent comedy-drama mystery film directed by Marshall Neilan and Henry Roberts Symonds and written by Marion Fairfax. The film stars Pat O'Malley, Wesley Barry, Noah Beery Sr. and Agnes Ayres. The cinematographer was David Kesson. The film was released on July 18, 1920 by First National Exhibitors' Circuit.

Actor Bull Montana (a former professional wrestler) played Ferry, the Ape Creature, in the film. He later went on to play the ape-man in the 1925 Willis H. O'Brien classic The Lost World, which was also written by Marion Fairfax and starred Noah Beery's actor brother Wallace Beery.

The film has a plot about brain transplants. A scientist transplanted the brain of a criminal into the body of a gorilla. The gorilla went on a killing spree against the criminal's enemies. A female newspaper owner decides to investigate the case.

== Plot ==
Helen Allen inherits her deceased father's newspaper, but someone is trying to sabotage the business. She gets a job at the company under a false name, so that she can detect exactly who is trying to ruin her. She winds up instead investigating a number of gruesome murders with the help of a reporter named Kirk Connelly.

One of the victims was a scientist named Dr. Ord. Helen learns that Dr. Ord had been involved in an experiment in which he transplanted the brain of a criminal into the body of a gorilla. The beast turned on him and then went on a killing spree, hunting down and murdering all of his old enemies. In the end, Helen also finds out who it was who was trying to ruin her newspaper.

== Cast ==
- Pat O'Malley as Kirk Connelly
- Wesley Barry as Dinty
- Agnes Ayres as Helen Allen
- J. Barney Sherry as 'Shut the Door' Gordon
- Charles Hill Mailes as J.L. Rich
- Noah Beery Sr. as Dr. Ord
- Bull Montana as Ferry the ape creature
- Walter Long as Jim Hogan
- Lydia Yeamans Titus as Lilly Doody
- George Dromgold as Thomas Hickson
- Edward Cooper as W.W. Crocker
- Charles West as Slim Hogan
- Ring Lardner
- Irvin S. Cobb
- Arthur Brisbane

== Preservation ==
The film was considered a lost film for decades. A print was discovered at the Cineteca Italiana film archive in Italy.
