= Fools First =

1922 film directed by Marshall Neilan

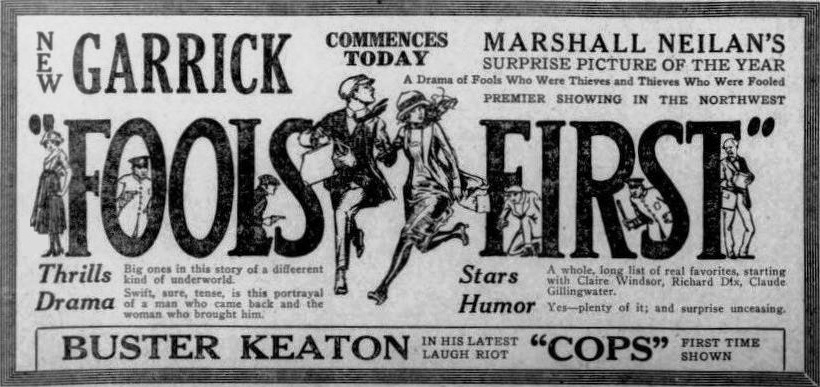
- Newspaper advertisement
- Directed by: Marshall Neilan
- Screenplay by: Marion Fairfax; Hugh Wiley
- Based on: Fool's First by Hugh MacNair Kahler
- Starring: Richard Dix; Claire Windsor; Claude Gillingwater; Raymond Griffith; George Siegmann; Helen Lynch
- Cinematography: David Kesson; Karl Struss
- Edited by: Daniel J. Gray
- Production company: Marshall Neilan Productions
- Distributed by: Associated First National Pictures
- Release date: May 27, 1922
- Running time: 60 minutes
- Country: United States
- Language: Silent (English intertitles)

Fools First is a 1922 American crime film directed by Marshall Neilan and written by Marion Fairfax and Hugh Wiley. The film stars Richard Dix, Claire Windsor, Claude Gillingwater, Raymond Griffith, George Siegmann, and Helen Lynch. The film was released on May 27, 1922, by Associated First National Pictures.

== Plot ==
As described in a film magazine, Tommy Frazer is part of a gang of crooks led by Tony the Wop and Kelley's Cafe is their hangout. One night gang member Skinny is killed by a member of a rival gang, and police officers, hearing the shooting, come to the flat. The police find Skinny sitting at a table, apparently playing cards, so they leave, not noticing that a gang member was behind Spider and holding the cards. To get even, the gang gets 'Blondie' Clark to coax The Kid from the rival gang to their rooms, and Tony stabs him and disposes of the body.

Tommy is caught in a forgery and is sent up to prison for three years. Ann Whittaker, a fellow worker, nods farewell as he is led away. When Tommy is released he goes to a distant town and, using phony letters of recommendation furnished by Ann, he gets a job at a bank. Soon he is in love with Ann. When a large sum is delivered to the bank, he grows restless and decides to steal it. Having been entrusted with the time lock of the bank, he takes the package of money.

The old gang, hearing of the money, comes to town. Tommy changes his mind about the crime, and, while returning the package of money to the vault, he is set upon by the gang and robbed. He goes to bank president Denton Drew to confess his part in the transaction, but is relieved to learn that the package did not contain any money, the banker having taken it home. Ann then declares her love for Tommy, providing a happy ending.

== Cast ==
- Richard Dix as Tommy Frazer
- Claire Windsor as Ann Whittaker
- Claude Gillingwater as Denton Drew
- Raymond Griffith as Tony
- George Siegmann as Spud Miller
- Helen Lynch as 'Blondie' Clark
- Shannon Day as 'Cutie' Williams
- George Dromgold as Skinny, the Hick
- Leo White as Geffy, the Dope
- Robert Brower as Butler
- Baby Peggy as Little Girl
