= Pat O'Malley (actor) =

American stage and film actor (1890–1966)

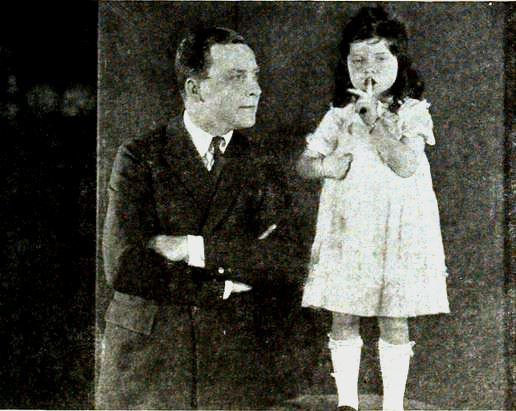
- O'Malley and daughter Eileen, 1922
- Born: Patrick Henry O'Malley Jr. September 3, 1890; Forest City, Pennsylvania, U.S.
- Died: May 21, 1966 (aged 75); Van Nuys, California, U.S.
- Resting place: San Fernando Mission Cemetery, Mission Hills, California, U.S.
- Occupation: Actor
- Years active: 1908–1964
- Spouse: Lillian Wilkes
- Children: 3, including Kathleen O'Malley

Pat O'Malley (September 3, 1890 – May 21, 1966) was an American vaudeville and stage performer prior to starting a prolific film career at the age of sixteen. He later had a career in television.

== Career ==
O'Malley was born as Patrick Henry O'Malley Jr. in Forest City, Pennsylvania. He had circus experience by the time he discovered an interest in motion pictures. His screen career dates from the days of Kalem and Edison Studios. From 1918 to 1927 he appeared in scores of silent films as both a leading man and a character actor i.e.: The Heart of Humanity, My Wild Irish Rose, The Virginian and in the adaptation of bestseller Brothers Under the Skin.

O'Malley saw his career decline with the advent of sound. He was quickly relegated to supporting parts, and appeared in some four-hundred films in bit parts and supporting roles. He guest-starred in the early musical series Faye Emerson's Wonderful Town on CBS. O'Malley remained on call into the early 1960s for such TV shows as The Twilight Zone and such films as Days of Wine and Roses.

== Family ==
In 1915, O'Malley married actress Lillian Wilkes (died December 15, 1976). The couple had three children: Sheila, Eileen, and Kathleen, an actress. O'Malley had a brother, Charles O'Malley (1897-1958), who was an actor and assistant director.

== Death ==
O'Malley died of a heart attack in 1966 at the age of 75; his interment was at San Fernando Mission Cemetery.

== Partial filmography ==
- The Love That Lives (1916) as Jimmy
- Hit-The-Trail Holliday (1918) as Kent B. Wurst
- The Prussian Cur (1918) as Jimmie O'Grady
- The Red Glove (1919) as Kern Thodes
- Go and Get It (1920) as Kirk Connelly
- Dinty (1920) as Jack North
- The Prospector's Vengeance (Short) (1920) as Joe
- The Breath of the Gods (1920) as T. Caraway Dodge
- Brothers Under the Skin (1922) as Newton Craddock
- A Game Chicken (1922) as Rush Thompson
- The Virginian (1923) as Steve
- Brass (1923) as Harry Baldwin
- The Mine with the Iron Door (1924) as Hugh Edwards
- The Beauty Prize (1924) as George Brady
- Happiness (1924) as Fermoy MacDonough
- Bread (1924) as Roy Beardsley
- The Fighting American (1924) as Bill Pendleton
- Proud Flesh (1925) as Pat O'Malley
- The White Desert (1925) as Barry
- The Teaser (1925) as James McDonald
- Spangles (1926) as Dick Hale aka Dick Radley
- Pleasure Before Business (1927) as Dr. Burke
- The Man I Love (1929) as D.J. McCarthy
- The Fall Guy (1930) as Charles Newton
- The Fighting Marshal (1931) as Deputy Ed Myers
- High Speed (1932) as Paul Whipple
- The Shadow of the Eagle (1932) as Ames
- Those We Love (1932) as Daley
- Frisco Jenny (1932) as O'Hoolihan
- The Whirlwind (1933) as Pat Patrick
- The Fighting Marines (1935) as Captain Grayson
- Men of the Hour (1935) as Police Captain
- Hollywood Boulevard (1936) as Pago Pago Patron
- The Roaring Twenties (1939) as Jailer (uncredited)
- Law of the Range (1941) as Mr. Howard
- The Wild One (1953) as Sawyer (uncredited)
- Alfred Hitchcock Presents (1959) (Season 4 Episode 28: "The Impossible Dream") as Wardrobe Attendant
