= Marshall Neilan =

American actor (1891–1958)

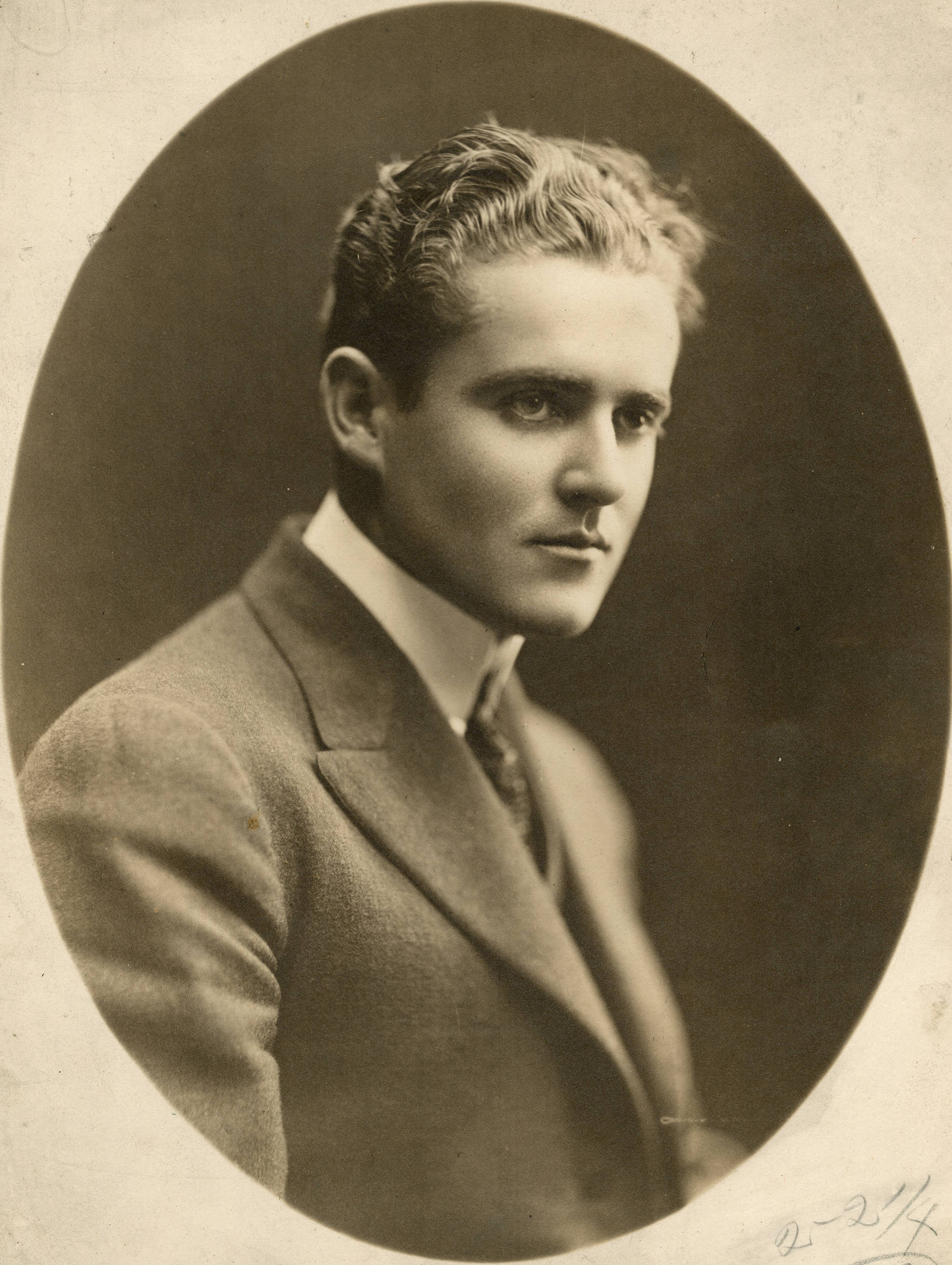
- Neilan in 1913
- Born: Marshall Ambrose Neilan; April 11, 1891; San Bernardino, California, U.S.
- Died: October 27, 1958 (aged 67); Los Angeles, California, U.S.
- Resting place: Angelus-Rosedale Cemetery
- Other name: Mickey Neilan
- Occupations: Actor; director; producer; screenwriter
- Years active: 1912–1957
- Spouses: Gertrude Bambrick (m. 1913; div. 1921) Blanche Sweet (m. 1922; div. 1929)
- Children: 1 son (w/ Bambrick)

Marshall Ambrose "Mickey" Neilan (April 11, 1891 – October 27, 1958; also credited Marshall Neilon) was an American actor, director, producer, and screenwriter, whose work in films began in the early silent era.

== Early life ==
Born in San Bernardino, California, Neilan was known by most as "Mickey." Following the death of his father, the eleven-year-old Mickey Neilan had to give up on school to work at whatever he could find in order to help support his mother. As a teenager, he began acting in bit parts in live theatre, and in 1910 he got a job as chauffeur, driving Biograph Studios executives around Los Angeles to determine the suitability of the West Coast as a place for a permanent studio.

== Career ==
Neilan made his film debut as part of the acting cast on the American Film Manufacturing Company Western The Stranger at Coyote (1912). Hired by Kalem Studios for their Western film production facility in Santa Monica, Neilan was first cast opposite Ruth Roland. Described as confident, but egotistical at times, Neilan's talent saw him directing films within a year of joining Kalem. After acting in more than seventy silent film shorts for Kalem and directing more than thirty others, Neilan was hired by the Selig Polyscope Company then Bison Motion Pictures and Famous Players–Lasky Corporation. In 1915, Neilan was one of the founding members of the Motion Picture Directors Association along with directors such as Cecil B. DeMille, Allan Dwan, and William Desmond Taylor.

At the end of 1916, Neilan was hired by Mary Pickford Films where he directed Pickford in several productions including Rebecca of Sunnybrook Farm and The Little Princess in 1917, plus Stella Maris in 1918, Amarilly of Clothes-Line Alley, M'Liss in 1918, and Daddy-Long-Legs in 1919.

Having all but given up acting, Neilan's directing successes led to him creating his own production company and between 1920 and 1926, Marshall Neilan Productions made eleven feature-length films almost all of which were distributed through First National Pictures. He received critical acclaim for directing and producing such films as Bits of Life and The Lotus Eater. In 1929, he was hired by RKO Radio Pictures; although he reputedly had difficulty adapting to directing the new talkies, that year he successfully directed Rudy Vallee and Marie Dressler in the "all-talking" The Vagabond Lover. Contrary to the legend that the film was a commercial and critical failure (except for Dressler's highly praised performance), the film was a hit, making a profit of $335,000, and was one of four top hits for RKO in 1929.

Early in his career Neilan had done as most others in the pioneering days of film and helped out in many areas of filmmaking through performing, directing, and writing. A talented screenwriter, in 1927 he wrote the original story for the Howard Hughes film, Hell's Angels. Initially, he had also been hired as the film's director, back when it was still a silent, but Hughes' overbearing style forced him to drop out, and he was replaced a few weeks into production by a more pliable director, Edmund Goulding; due to massive reshoots (as well as the recasting of the lead role with Jean Harlow), none of the footage Neilan shot made it into the final film. He was then hired by Hal Roach Studios, for whom he directed a few films in 1930, and he made his final directorial effort in 1937. Having battled alcoholism for a large part of his adult life, twenty years after he made his last film, Neilan returned to acting on the screen in a small role portraying an aging and less than enlightened United States Senator in the Elia Kazan film, A Face in the Crowd.

In 1955, Neilan was awarded The George Eastman Award, given by George Eastman House for distinguished contribution to the art of film.

In recognition of his contribution to the motion picture industry, in 1940 the Directors Guild of America conferred on him an "Honorary Life Member Award." He later received a star on the Hollywood Walk of Fame at 6233 Hollywood Blvd.

== Personal life and death ==
Marshall Neilan married actress Gertrude Bambrick in 1913 with whom he had a son, Marshall Neilan Jr, their only child. A year after he and Bambrick divorced in 1921, Neilan married actress Blanche Sweet, whom he directed on several occasions. They too divorced in 1929.

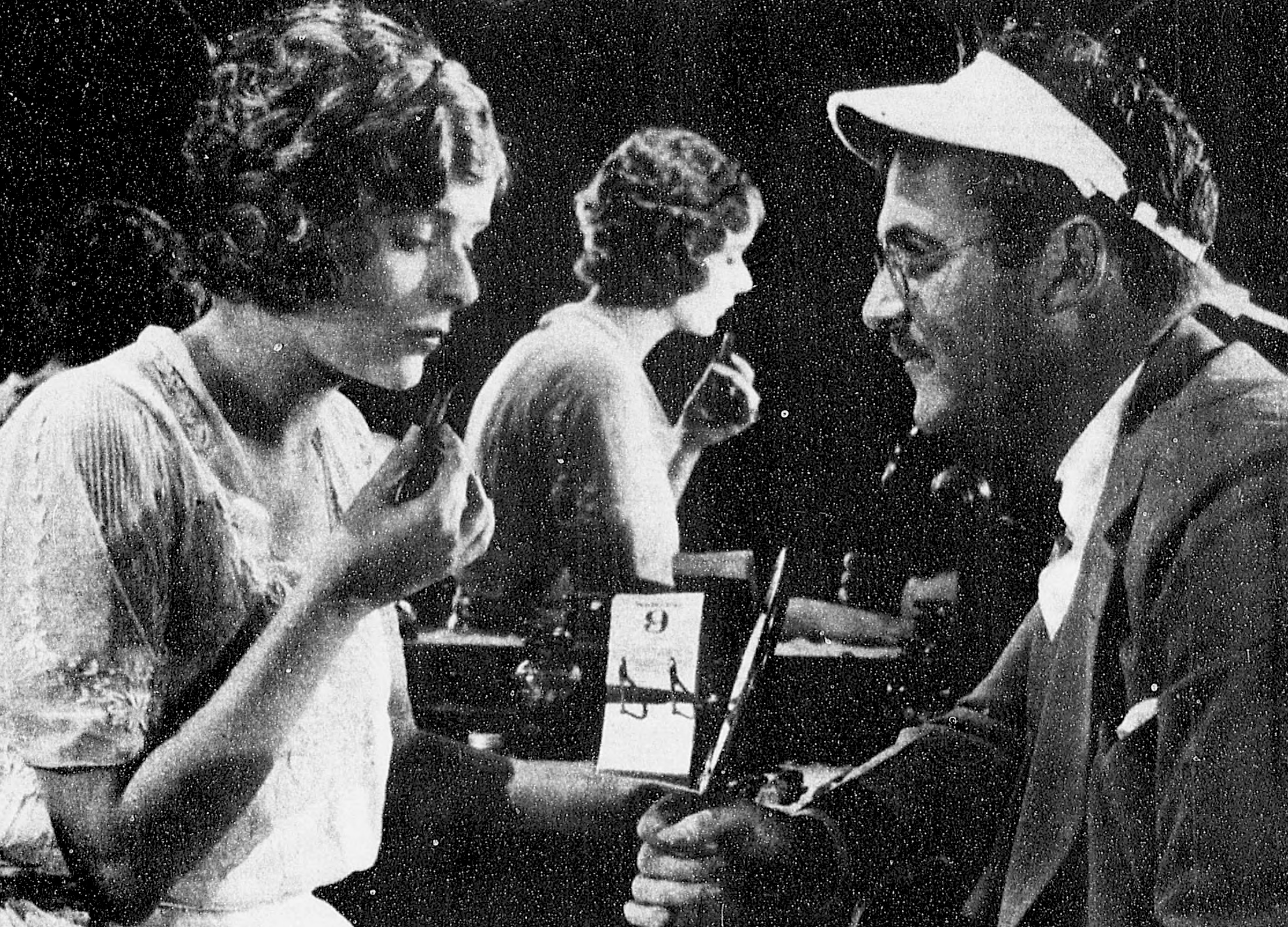
Neilan with Blanche Sweet in 1922, the year they married

Neilan died in Los Angeles in 1958 of throat cancer. He is interred there in Angelus-Rosedale Cemetery.

== Selected filmography ==
- Ranch Girls on a Rampage (1912, Short) - The Police Officer
- The Wooers of Mountain Kate (1912, Short)
- Fatty's Busy Day (1913, Short) - Minor Role
- The Wall of Money (1913, Short) - Neilan - Idea Man
- The Sheriff of Stone Gulch (1913, Short) - Black McCarty
- The House of Discord (1913, Short) - The Daughter's Sweetheart
- Judith of Bethulia (1914) - Minor Role (uncredited)
- Ham the Iceman (1914, Short) - Dick - Alice's Sweetheart
- Put Me Off at Wayville (1915, Short) - Billy - a Friend
- The Country Boy (1915) - Tom Wilson
- The Love Route (1915)
- The Commanding Officer (1915) - Capt. Waring
- May Blossom (1915) - Richard Ashcroft
- Little Pal (1915) - Minor Role (uncredited)
- Rags (1915) - Keith Duncan
- A Girl of Yesterday (1915) - Stanley Hudson
- Madame Butterfly (1915) - Lt. Pinkerton
- Mice and Men (1916) - Captain George Lovell
- The Cycle of Fate (1916) - Doctor Burton
- The Prince Chap (1916) - William Peyton
- The Crisis (1916) - Clarence Colfax
- Calamity Anne, Guardian (1916)
- Daddy-Long-Legs (1919) - Jimmie Mc Bride
- Broadway Gold (1923) - The Driver
- Hollywood Boulevard (1936) - Cinegrill Customer (uncredited)
- A Star is Born (1937) - Bert (uncredited)
- A Face in the Crowd (1957) - Sen. Worthington Fuller (final film role)

=== Director ===
- The American Princess (1913)
- Rube, the Interloper (1914)
- The Deadly Battle at Hicksville (1914)
- The Chronicles of Bloom Center (1915)
- The Prince Chap (1916)
- Freckles (1917)
- Rebecca of Sunnybrook Farm (1917)
- A Little Princess (1917)
- Stella Maris (1918)
- Amarilly of Clothes-Line Alley (1918)
- M'Liss (1918)
- Hit-The-Trail Holliday (1918)
- Heart of the Wilds (1918)
- Out of a Clear Sky (1918)
- Her Kingdom of Dreams (1919)
- The Unpardonable Sin (1919)
- Daddy-Long-Legs (1919)
- Go and Get It (1920)
- Don't Ever Marry (1920)
- Bits of Life (1921)
- Bob Hampton of Placer (1921)
- The Lotus Eater (1921)
- Fools First (1922)
- Minnie (1923)
- The Eternal Three (1923)
- Dorothy Vernon of Haddon Hall (1924)
- Tess of the d'Urbervilles (1924)
- The Great Love (1925)
- The Sporting Venus (1925)
- Mike (1926)
- Diplomacy (1926)
- Wild Oats Lane (1926)
- Her Wild Oat (1927)
- Venus of Venice (1927)
- Three-Ring Marriage (1928)
- Taxi 13 (1928)
- His Last Haul (1928)
- Take Me Home (1928)
- The Vagabond Lover (1929)
- Black Waters (1929)
- The Awful Truth (1929)
- Tanned Legs (1929)
- Sweethearts on Parade (1930)
- Social Register (1933)
- Chloe, Love Is Calling You (1934)
- This Is the Life (1935)
- Sing While You're Able (1937)
- Swing It, Professor (1937)
- Thanks for Listening (1937)

=== Producer ===
- The River's End (1920)
- Don't Ever Marry (1920)
- Go and Get It (1920)
- Dinty (1920)
- Bob Hampton of Placer (1921)
- Bits of Life (1921)
- The Lotus Eater (1921)
- Penrod (1922)
- Fools First (1922)
- The Strangers' Banquet (1922)
- Wild Oats Lane (1926)
- Everybody's Acting (1926)
- Social Register (1934)

=== Writer ===
- Saved from Court Martial (1912)
- The Reformation of Dad (Story, 1913)
- The Wall of Money (1913)
- Si's Wonderful Mineral Spring (1914)
- The Deadly Battle at Hicksville (Story; 1914)
- Ham the Iceman (Story, 1914)
- The Winning Whiskers (Story, 1914)
- The Reformation of Ham (1914)
- Ham at the Garbage Gentleman's Ball (1915)
- The Come Back of Percy (Scenario, 1915)
- The Cycle of Fate (1916)
- The Country That God Forgot (Story, 1916)
- A Strange Adventure (Story, 1917)
- Dinty (1920)
- Bits of Life (1921)
- Minnie (1922)
- The Strangers' Banquet (1922)
- The Eternal Three (1923)
- The Great Love (1925)
- Mike (1926)
- Hell's Angels (Story, 1930)
- Chloe, Love Is Calling You (Story and screenplay, 1934)
- The Adventures of Tom Sawyer (Uncredited, 1938)
