= Red viper (disambiguation) =

Red viper or the red viper may refer to:

- Agkistrodon contortrix mokasen, a subspecies of snake
- The Red Viper, 1919 silent film
- "the Red Viper", a nickname for the character Oberyn Martell
