= Return to Babylon =

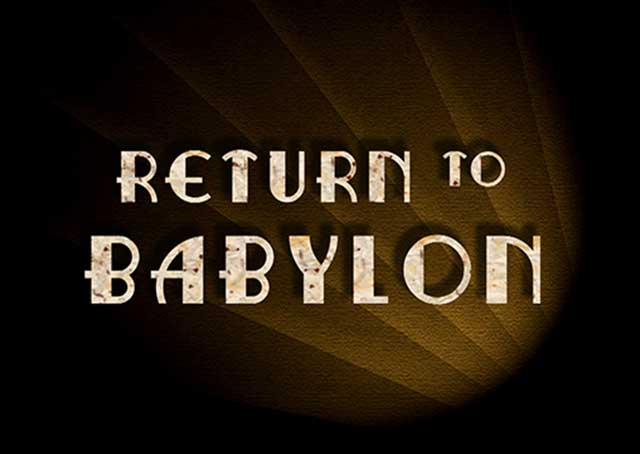
- Directed by: Alex Monty Canawati
- Written by: Alex Monty Canawati; Bruce Pitzer; Stanley Sheff
- Produced by: María Conchita Alonso; Stanley Sheff
- Starring: Jennifer Tilly; María Conchita Alonso; Debi Mazar; Ione Skye; Laura Harring; Tippi Hedren
- Cinematography: Scott Dale; Cricket Peters
- Edited by: Stanley Sheff
- Release dates: 11 August 2013 (United States); 16 January 2019 (World Internet Release)
- Running time: 75 minutes
- Country: United States
- Language: English

Return to Babylon is a 2013 black-and-white silent film about the silent film era. It was directed by Alex Monty Canawati. It stars an ensemble cast of Jennifer Tilly, María Conchita Alonso, Ione Skye, Debi Mazar, Laura Harring, and Tippi Hedren.

== Premise ==
Photographed with a hand-cranked camera and scored with music of the roaring twenties, this silent film strings together the lives of the most famous and infamous stars of the 1920s, including Rudolph Valentino, Gloria Swanson, Clara Bow, Lupe Vélez, Fatty Arbuckle, and William Desmond Taylor.

== Cast ==
- Jennifer Tilly as Clara Bow
- María Conchita Alonso as Lupe Vélez
- Ione Skye as Virginia Rappe
- Debi Mazar as Gloria Swanson
- Tippi Hedren as Mrs. Peabody
- Rolonda Watts as Josephine Baker
- Laura Harring as Alla Nazimova
- Morganne Picard as Mabel Normand
- Brett Ashy as Fatty Arbuckle
- Paul Kent as Mack Sennett
- Michael Goldman as Adolph Zukor
- Stephen Saux as Mr. Producer
- Marina Bakica as Alma Rubens
- Jack Atlantis as William Desmond Taylor
- Wendy Caron as Barbara La Marr
- Phillip Bloch as Ramon Novarro
- Robert Sherman as Erich von Stroheim
- Devora Lillian as Mary Miles Minter
- Maxwell DeMille as Douglas Fairbanks
- Alex Monty Canawati as Rudolph Valentino
- Adnan Taletovich as John Gilbert
- Jennifer Seifert as Pola Negri

== Background ==
Return to Babylon features locations in and around Hollywood, California, including the original home of Rudolph Valentino, Falcon Lair, as well as the Norma Talmadge estate, the Canfield-Moreno Estate, and the Magic Castle in the Hollywood Hills.

The feature was shot using 19 rolls of 16mm film supposedly found sitting on a sidewalk on Hollywood Boulevard in Hollywood, California.

== Reports of paranormal activity ==
The film's marketing played up the notion that the film was haunted. Media releases and interviews stated that the actors faces can be seen "morphing" into grotesque shapes in certain shots. There were reports of actors having elongated and webbed fingers, full bodied apparitions, seeing the faces of dead actors (such as Lon Chaney) manifest in shots, and shadows resembling demons or skeletons. Many of the cast and crew had confirmed many of these reports and stated they experienced odd events during production, with Jennifer Tilly in particular describing feeling "watched" and "touched" by unseen forces during filming.

== Release ==
The film was released on 11 August 2013 in the United States. It was released on 15 January 2019 on YouTube after years of not finding home video distribution.
