= While Paris Sleeps =

While Paris Sleeps may refer to:

- While Paris Sleeps (1923 film), an American silent drama film
- While Paris Sleeps (1932 film), an American pre-Code drama film

== See also ==
- The Crazy Ray, originally titled Paris Qui Dort (literally "Paris which sleeps"), a 1924 French science fiction comedy silent film
