= Gentleman's Fate =

1931 film

- Theatrical release poster
- Directed by: Mervyn LeRoy
- Screenplay by: Leonard Praskins
- Based on: A Gentleman's Fate; 1931 story in Household by Ursula Parrott
- Starring: John Gilbert; Louis Wolheim; Leila Hyams; Anita Page; Marie Prevost
- Cinematography: Merritt B. Gerstad
- Edited by: William S. Gray
- Production company: Metro-Goldwyn-Mayer
- Distributed by: Metro-Goldwyn-Mayer
- Release date: March 7, 1931
- Running time: 90 minutes
- Country: United States
- Language: English

Gentleman's Fate is a 1931 American pre-Code drama film directed by Mervyn LeRoy and written by Leonard Praskins. The film stars John Gilbert, Louis Wolheim, Leila Hyams, Anita Page, and Marie Prevost. The film was released on March 7, 1931, by Metro-Goldwyn-Mayer, just seventeen days after Wolheim's untimely death.

== Plot ==
Jack Thomas has grown up in the belief that he was an orphan. His guardian tells him that he has an elder brother in New Jersey named Frank Tomasulo, and a dying father, Francesco, both of whom are in the bootlegging business during the prohibition era.

On his deathbed, Francesco gives Jack an emerald necklace. Jack gives it to his fiancée, Marjorie Channing, but it turns out to have been stolen. Frank does not want his father's name to be dishonored, so he forces Jack to falsely admit to having stolen the necklace. Marjorie breaks off the engagement and travels to England.

After a brief spell in jail and Francesco's death, Jack realizes he can never resume his place in polite society and, with Frank's encouragement, decides to join the family business. During the attempted hijacking of the gang's booze by the Florio mob, he kills Dante, Florio's brother-in-law, saving Frank's life.

Several months later, Jack returns to Jersey after having hidden out in Canada. Frank is throwing a "peace banquet" to show Florio who's the boss, especially by fixing up Jack with Ruth, Florio's old girlfriend. Florio agrees to work with Frank's mob, splitting things 50-50, as long as he can kill the man who shot Dante. Jack enters the party, and Florio instantly recognizes him as the shooter, throwing out insinuations at both him and Ruth.

Jack throws a punch at Florio and the gangs draw their guns, but the violence is cut short as cops raid the joint. Jack tells Frank that, with Marjorie due to return from abroad, he wants to quit the racket and get back together with her, but Frank shows him a newspaper story telling of her marriage. After drinking an entire bottle of whiskey, the drunken Jack marries Ruth.

In revenge, Florio makes plans to kill Jack and Ruth as they're about to leave for their honeymoon. A waiter tips off Frank's men, but Florio anticipates the betrayal and shoots the waiter, revealing his plan to commit the murders immediately. Mabel, a moll in Frank's gang, sees Florio and his men approach Ruth's apartment, realizes what's happening, and alerts Frank.

Jack arrives at Ruth's apartment and kills Florio's girlfriend. Florio, hearing the gunshots, draws his gun, but Ruth shoots him in the back. The wounded Florio turns, and Jack finishes the job just as Frank enters. Jack, having been shot himself, falls, mortally wounded.

In Ruth's bedroom, Jack is lying in bed and a doctor tells Frank it's curtains for Jack. Jack tells his brother to get out of the racket, and as he dies, tells Frank to take care of his wife.

== Cast ==
- John Gilbert as Giacomo Tomasulo / Jack Thomas
- Louis Wolheim as Frank Tomasulo
- Leila Hyams as Marjorie Channing
- Anita Page as Ruth Corrigan
- Marie Prevost as Mabel
- John Miljan as Florio
- George Cooper as Mike
- Ferike Boros as Angela
- Ralph Ince as Dante
- Frank Reicher as Papa Francesco Tomasulo
- Paul Porcasi as Papa Mario Giovanni
- Tenen Holtz as Tony
