= Shame (1921 film) =

1921 film by Emmett J. Flynn

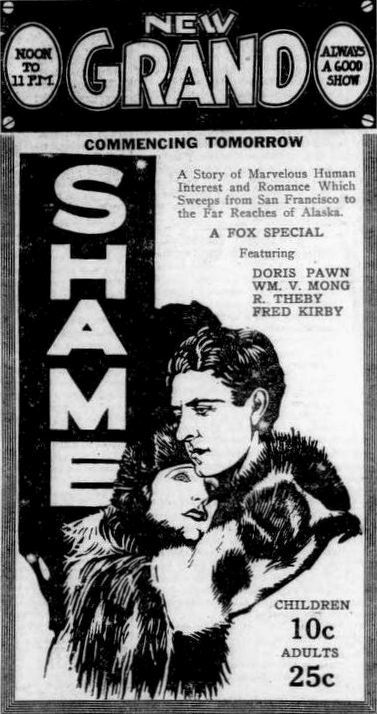
- Newspaper advertisement
- Directed by: Emmett J. Flynn
- Written by: Emmett J. Flynn; Bernard McConville
- Based on: Clung by Max Brand
- Starring: John Gilbert
- Cinematography: Lucien N. Andriot
- Distributed by: Fox Film Corporation
- Release date: July 31, 1921 (USA)
- Running time: 9 reels
- Country: United States
- Language: Silent (English intertitles)

Shame is a 1921 American silent drama film directed by Emmett J. Flynn. It is based on the story Clung by Max Brand, which appeared in the magazine All Story Weekly (10 Apr - 15 May 1920 edition). The film was distributed and produced by Fox Film Corporation. It is presumed to be a lost film.

== Plot ==
William Fielding, a missionary in China, loses his wife after she gives birth to a son named David. He then marries a Chinese woman named Lotus Blossom, who treats the child as if it were her own. A trader named Foo Chang is madly in love with the woman. Believing the child to be hers, he kills William and brands David. Lotus Blossom commits suicide as a result. However, Li Clung, aware of the child's true parentage, takes David to the home of his wealthy grandfather in San Francisco. There, the boy befriends Li Clung and later inherits his grandfather's business and the Fielding estate when he becomes older.

David marries an American woman named Winifred Wellington. Following David's marriage, however, Foo Chang appears. He is now the head of an opium ring and tries to bribe David to help him bring a cargo of opium into the city. When David refuses, Foo Chang tells David that he is half-Chinese. Although he has no proof other than the brand on David's arm, that is enough to convince David. He goes to pieces and flees with his infant son to Alaska.

Winifred goes to Li Clung, who kills Foo Chang and also promises to take her to David but not telling her about her husband's true ethnicity. Li Clung only reveals the truth when Winifred is reunited with her husband. The family returns to San Francisco to live happily ever after.

== Cast ==
- John Gilbert as William Fielding / David Field
- Michael D. Moore as David, age 5 (credited as Mickey Moore)
- Frankie Lee as David, age 10
- George Siegmann as Foo Chang
- William V. Mong as Li Clung
- George Nichols as Jonathan Fielding
- Anna May Wong as Lotus Blossom
- Rosemary Theby as The Weaver of Dreams
- Doris Pawn as Winifred Wellington
- David Kirby as 'Once-over' Jake (credited as 'Red' Kirby)

== Censorship ==
Before Shame could be exhibited in Kansas, the Kansas Board of Review required the elimination of several scenes related to branding David, use of opium, and putting a diaper on a baby.
