= The Love Gambler =

1922 film

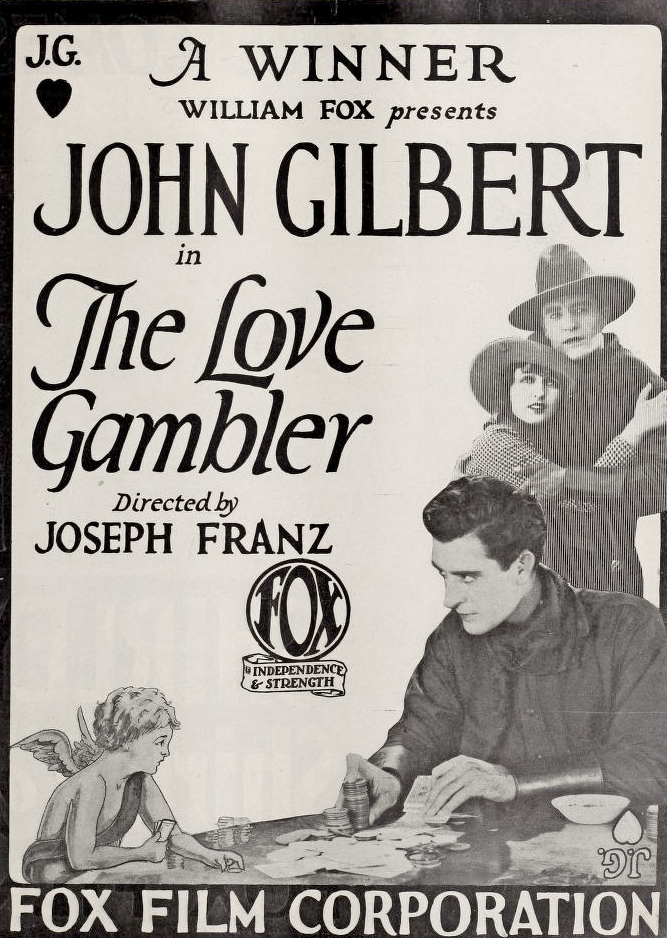
- Directed by: Joseph Franz
- Screenplay by: Jules Furthman
- Based on: Where the Heart Lies; 1922 story in Success (magazine) by Lillian Bennett-Thompson; George Hubbard
- Produced by: William Fox
- Starring: John Gilbert; Carmel Myers; Bruce Gordon; C.E. Anderson; W. E. Lawrence; James Gordon
- Cinematography: Joseph August
- Production company: Fox Film Corporation
- Distributed by: Fox Film Corporation
- Release date: November 12, 1922
- Running time: 50 minutes
- Country: United States
- Languages: Silent; English intertitles

The Love Gambler is a 1922 American silent Western film directed by Joseph Franz and written by Jules Furthman. The film stars John Gilbert, Carmel Myers, Bruce Gordon, C.E. Anderson, W. E. Lawrence and James Gordon. The film was released on November 12, 1922, by Fox Film Corporation.

== Cast ==
- John Gilbert as Dick Manners
- Carmel Myers as Jean McClelland
- Bruce Gordon as Joe McClelland
- C.E. Anderson as Curt Evans
- W. E. Lawrence as Tom Gould
- James Gordon as Colonel Angus McClelland
- Mrs Cohen as Mrs McClelland
- Barbara Tennant as Kate
- Edward Cecil as Cameo Colby
- Doreen Turner as Ricardo

== Preservation ==
With no prints of The Love Gambler located in any film archives, it is considered a lost film.
