= Slander the Woman =

1923 film

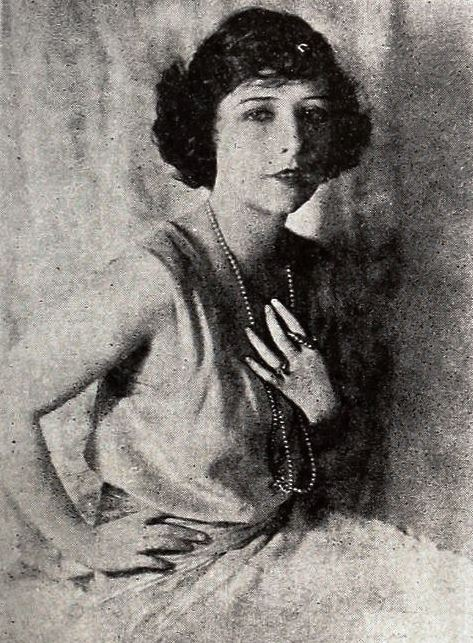
- Film still
- Directed by: Allen Holubar
- Screenplay by: Violet Clark
- Based on: The White Frontier by Jeffrey Deprend
- Produced by: Allen Holubar
- Starring: Dorothy Phillips; Lewis Dayton; Robert Anderson; Mayme Kelso
- Cinematography: Byron Haskin
- Edited by: Frank Lawrence
- Production company: Allen Holubar Pictures
- Distributed by: Associated First National Pictures
- Release date: April 16, 1923
- Running time: 70 minutes
- Country: United States
- Language: Silent (English intertitles)

Slander the Woman is a 1923 American drama film directed by Allen Holubar and written by Violet Clark. The film stars Dorothy Phillips, Lewis Dayton, Robert Anderson, Mayme Kelso, George Siegmann, and Ynez Seabury. The film was released on April 16, 1923, by Associated First National Pictures.

== Plot ==
As described in a film magazine, Yvonne Desmarest, an attractive young society leader from Montreal, is annoyed by the attentions of Monsieur Redoux. She is named "the other woman" by the stern young judge Duroacher following the shooting of Redoux by his jealous wife. Branded a social outcast, Yvonne determines to seek refuge and takes her maid to a cabin in the north woods which formerly was a hunting camp of her father's. There they meet the trapper Emile, who becomes their protector. She has numerous adventures with other strange fugitives. The Judge, once he realizes the injustice he has done to Yvonne, goes north, gets wounded, ignored, rebuffed, and then finally loved by the young woman who once had sworn to hate him.

== Cast ==
- Dorothy Phillips as Yvonne Desmarest
- Lewis Dayton as Monsieur Duroacher
- Robert Anderson as Dr. Emile Molleur
- Mayme Kelso as Nanette
- George Siegmann as Scarborough
- Ynez Seabury as Indian Girl
- Herbert Fortier as Father Machette
- Gino Corrado as Tetreau
- William Orlamond as The Stranger
- Robert Schable as Monsieur Redoux
- Rosemary Theby as Madame Redoux
- Irene Haisman as Marie Desplanes
- Cyril Chadwick as Monsieur Lemond
