= When a Girl Loves (1924 film) =

1924 silent film

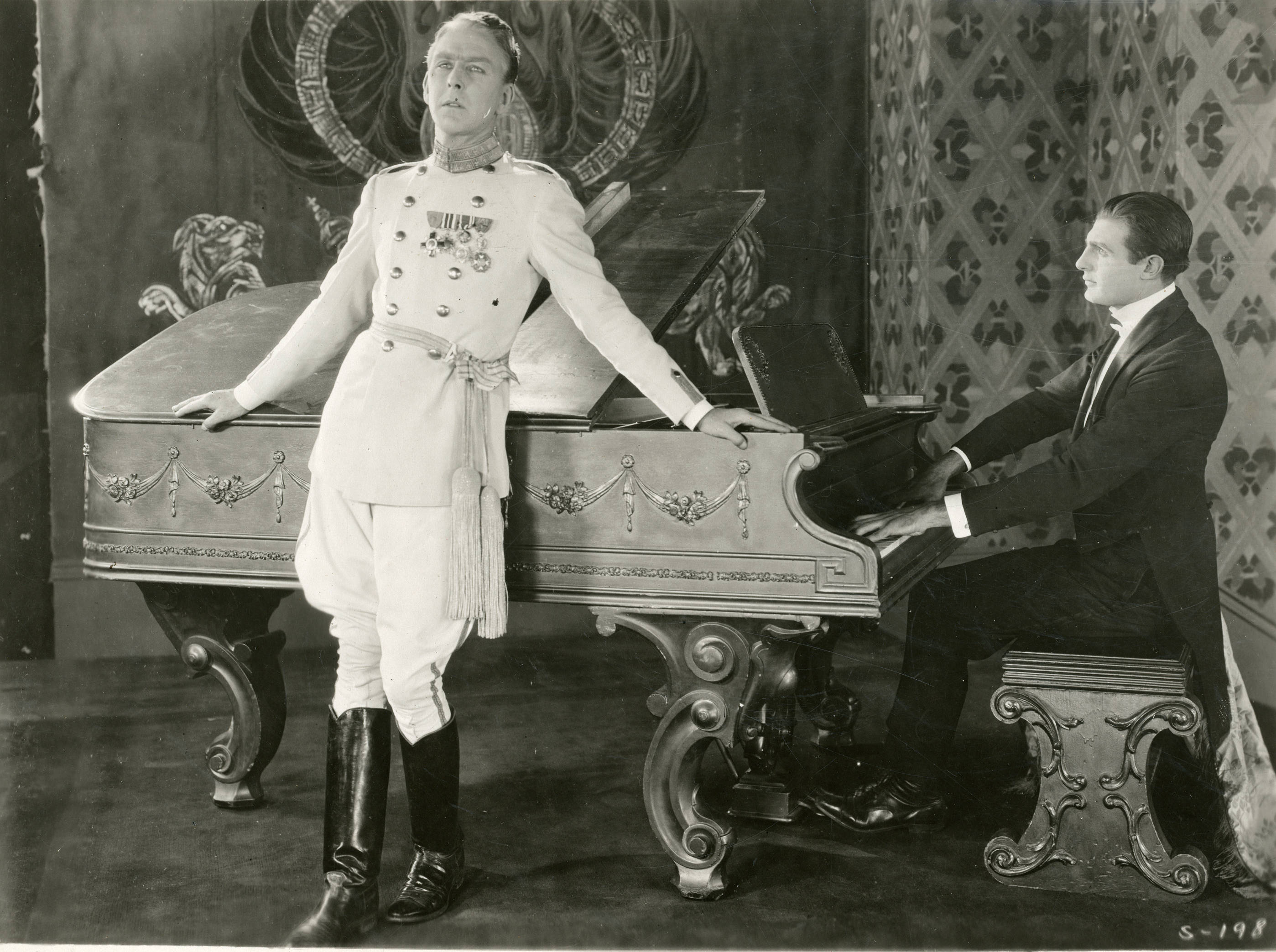
- Directed by: Victor Halperin
- Written by: Victor Halperin
- Produced by: Victor Halperin
- Starring: Agnes Ayres; Percy Marmont; Robert McKim
- Cinematography: Alvin Wyckoff
- Production company: Victor Halperin Productions
- Distributed by: Associated Exhibitors
- Release date: April 20, 1924
- Running time: 60 minutes
- Country: United States
- Language: Silent (English intertitles)

When a Girl Loves is a 1924 American silent drama film directed by Victor Halperin and starring Agnes Ayres, Percy Marmont, and Robert McKim.

== Plot ==
As described in a film magazine review, the Russian Revolution reduces the Boroff family to poverty. Sasha Boroff, in love with Count Michael, is saved from a forced marriage to Rogojin by the latter's sudden death. The Boroff's immigrate to the United States, where Sasha agrees to wed the wealthy Dr. Godfrey Luke. At a concert she recognizes Michael when she hears him sing, he having been reported dead. However, he is married. A love affair between Dr. Luke and Michael's wife results in a shooting affray between the ex-Count and Luke. They miss each other, but Sasha is wounded in the arm. The shock leaves Michael prostrated. He is restored to health by Sasha's dwarf friend, Grishka, who has discovered a cure with radio-vibration. In a vague ending, although Michael has been brought back to life by the radio invention of Grishka, and Sasha inconvenienced by a bullet wound in the arm, he is still united to an utterly superfluous wife, and Sasha remains the spouse of Dr. Luke.

== Cast ==
- Agnes Ayres as Sasha Boroff
- Percy Marmont as Count Michael
- Robert McKim as Dr. Godfrey Luke
- Kathlyn Williams as Helen, Michael's Wife
- John George as Grishka
- Mary Alden as The Czarina
- George Siegmann as Rogojin
- Ynez Seabury as Fania
- William Orlamond as Alexis
- Rosa Rosanova as Ferdova
- Leo White as Yussoff

== Preservation ==
Unlike the 1919 film of the same title, this film survives in a foreign archive, Cineteca Italiana (Milan).

== Bibliography ==
- Munden, Kenneth White. The American Film Institute Catalog of Motion Pictures Produced in the United States, Part 1. University of California Press, 1997.
