= The Exiles (1923 film) =

1923 film by Edmund Mortimer

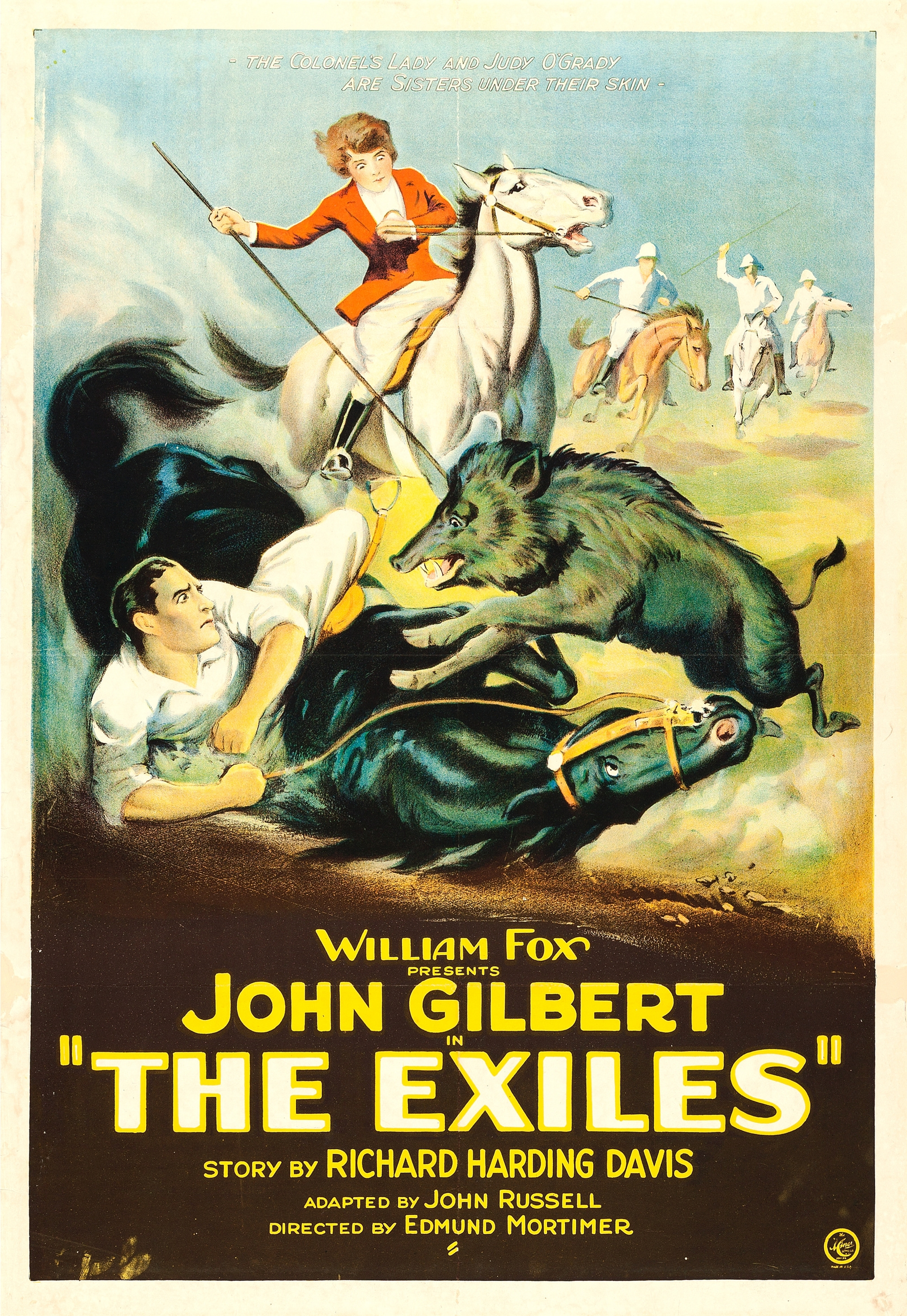
- Theatrical release poster
- Directed by: Edmund Mortimer
- Screenplay by: Frederick J. Jackson; John Russell
- Based on: The Exiles, and Other Stories; 1894 novel by Richard Harding Davis
- Produced by: William Fox
- Starring: John Gilbert; Betty Bouton; John Webb Dillion; Margaret Fielding; Fred Warren
- Production company: Fox Film Corporation
- Distributed by: Fox Film Corporation
- Release date: October 14, 1923
- Running time: 50 minutes
- Country: United States
- Language: Silent (English intertitles)

The Exiles is a 1923 American adventure film directed by Edmund Mortimer and written by Frederick J. Jackson and John Russell. It is based on the 1894 novel The Exiles by Richard Harding Davis. The film stars John Gilbert, Betty Bouton, John Webb Dillion, Margaret Fielding and Fred Warren. The film was released on October 14, 1923, by Fox Film Corporation.

In the film, a female murder suspect flees to Algiers, where she joins other self-exiled Americans. The prosecuting attorney follows her all the way to North Africa, and kidnaps her.

== Plot ==
As described in a film magazine review, a man is shot in his office. Alice Carroll is arrested and charged with the murder. She escapes and goes to Algiers, where she stays at a notorious gambling resort in the company of fugitives known as "The Exiles."

Henry Holcombe, the prosecuting attorney, discovers that Alice is innocent. He follows her to North Africa. When she refuses to return to the United States, Henry kidnaps her. They fall in love and she becomes his wife.

== Cast ==
- John Gilbert as Henry Holcombe
- Betty Bouton as Alice Carroll
- John Webb Dillion as Wilhelm von Linke
- Margaret Fielding as Rose Ainsmith
- Fred Warren as Dr. Randolph

== Preservation ==
With no prints of The Exiles located in any film archives, it is considered a lost film.
