= The Wife of the Centaur =

1924 film directed by King Vidor

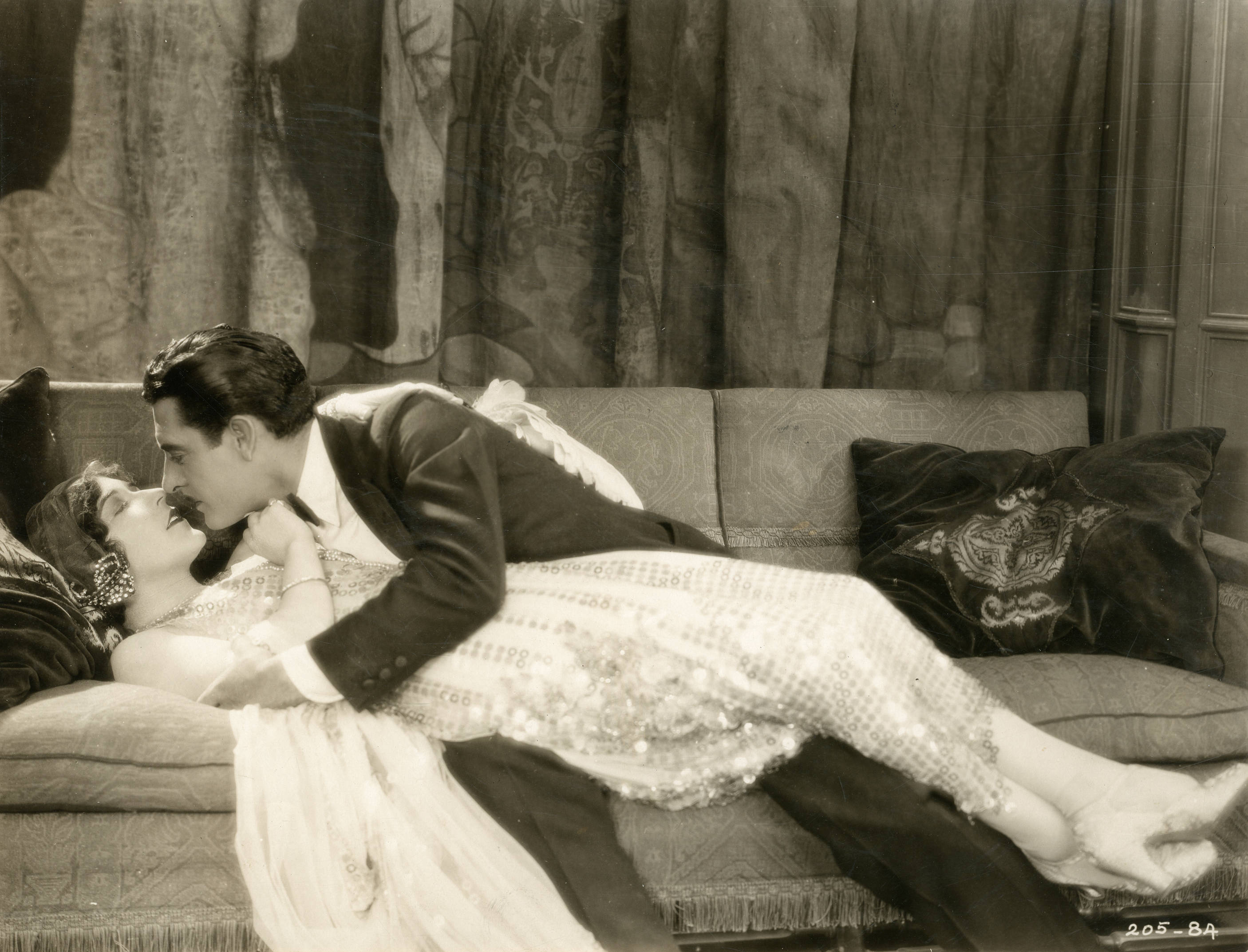
- Still with John Gilbert and Aileen Pringle
- Directed by: King Vidor
- Written by: Douglas Z. Doty
- Based on: The Wife of the Centaur by Cyril Hume
- Starring: Eleanor Boardman; John Gilbert; Aileen Pringle
- Cinematography: John Arnold
- Edited by: Hugh Wynn
- Distributed by: Metro-Goldwyn-Mayer
- Release date: December 1, 1924
- Running time: 81 minutes
- Country: United States
- Language: Silent (English intertitles)

The Wife of the Centaur is a 1924 American silent drama film directed by King Vidor, and released by Metro-Goldwyn-Mayer shortly after it formed from a merger of Metro Pictures, Goldwyn Pictures, and Mayer Pictures in April 1924. Metro had acquired the movie rights to Cyril Hume's debut novel Wife of a Centaur (Doran, 1923) in November. A novelist imagines that he has been reincarnated as a creature from Greek mythology and becomes entangled in a love triangle.

== Plot ==
As described in a review in a film magazine, author and poet Jeffrey Dwyer has a conflicted nature, at times he has high ideals but he also feels strongly the appeal of the purely sensual. He is strongly attracted to Joan Converse, who drops her flapper nature when she falls in love with him, but he neglects her when he meets the flashing, dashing Inez Martin, a worldly woman with strong sex appeal. Inez finally throws him over and marries Harry Todd, but the marriage is a failure. Jeffrey, returning to his senses after a period of debauchery and wild jazz parties, marries Joan. They go to a lodge in the mountains and are happy until Inez, seeking to win him, takes a house nearby. For months he fights the infatuation, but one night writes a letter to Joan and goes to Inez. However, his better nature makes him realize himself as he really is, and he returns to Joan, who understands and forgives him.

== Cast ==
- Eleanor Boardman as Joan Converse
- John Gilbert as Jeffrey Dwyer
- Aileen Pringle as Inez Martin
- Kate Lester as Mrs. Converse
- William Haines as Edward Converse
- Kate Price as Mattie
- Jacqueline Gadsden as Hope Larrimore
- Bruce Covington as Mr. Larrimore
- Philo McCullough as Harry Todd
- Lincoln Stedman as Chuck
- William Orlamond as Uncle Roger
- Marion Davies as Cameo in chorus line
- Betty Francisco

== Preservation ==
With no prints of The Wife of the Centaur (1924) located in any film archives, it is a lost film. A few seconds of Boardman from this film is included (from around 3:07 to 3:10) in Twenty Years After (1944), a promotional short made by MGM to celebrate its 20th anniversary.

== Sources ==
- Durgnat, Raymond and Simmon, Scott (1988). King Vidor, American. University of California Press, Berkeley. ISBN 0-520-05798-8
