= A California Romance =

1922 film

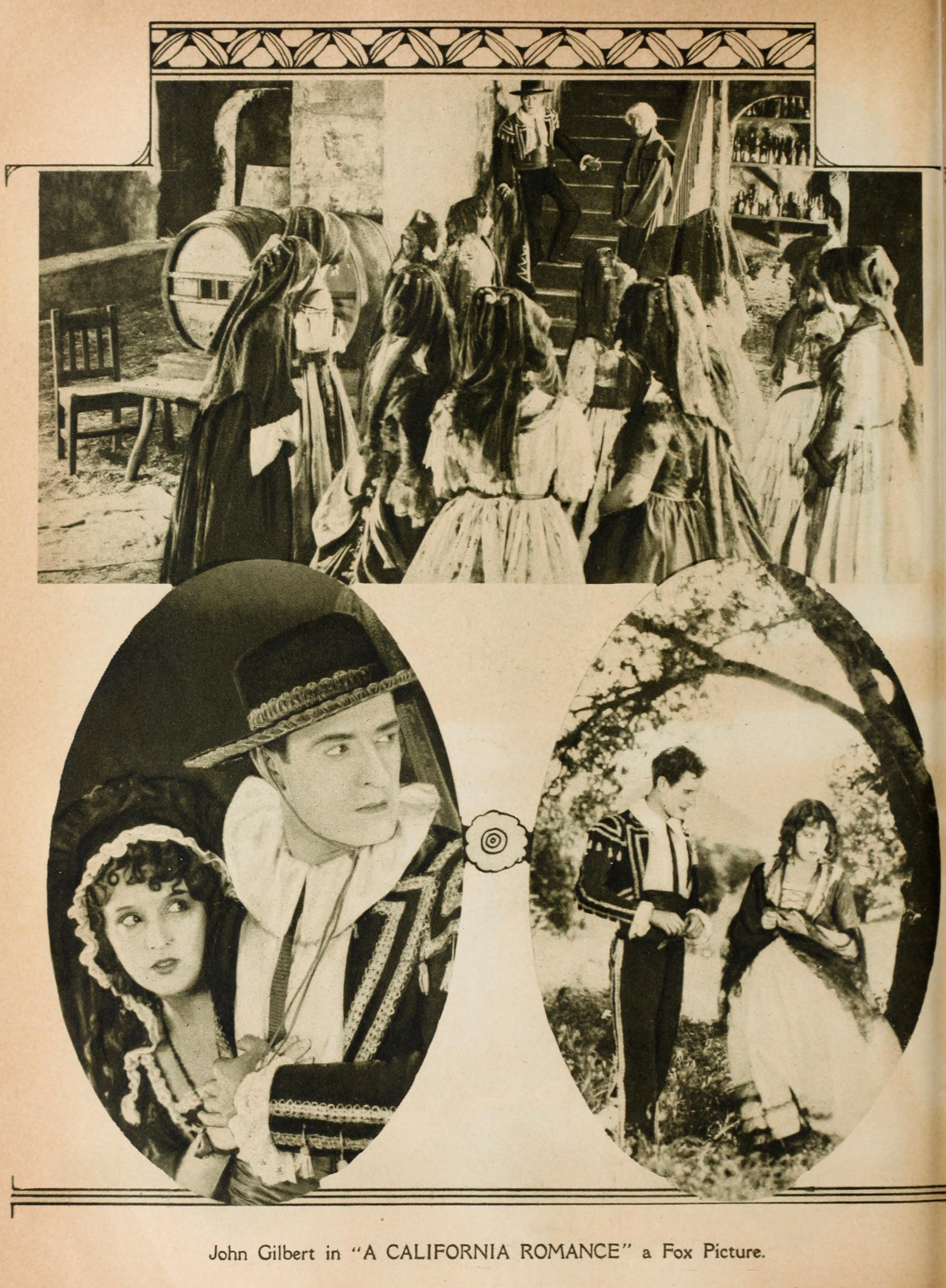
- John Gilbert in publicity stills
- Directed by: Jerome Storm
- Screenplay by: Charles E. Banks
- Story by: Jules Furthman
- Starring: John Gilbert; Estelle Taylor; George Siegmann; Jack McDonald; C.E. Anderson
- Cinematography: Joseph August
- Production company: Fox Film Corporation
- Distributed by: Fox Film Corporation
- Release date: December 24, 1922
- Running time: 50 minutes
- Country: United States
- Language: English

A California Romance is a 1922 American silent comedy film directed by Jerome Storm and written by Charles E. Banks. The film stars John Gilbert, Estelle Taylor, George Siegmann, Jack McDonald and C.E. Anderson. The film was released on December 24, 1922, by Fox Film Corporation.

== Cast ==
- John Gilbert as Don Patricio Fernando
- Estelle Taylor as Donna Dolores
- George Siegmann as Don Juan Diego
- Jack McDonald as Don Manuel Casca
- C.E. Anderson as Steve

== Preservation ==
With no prints of A California Romance located in any film archives, it is considered a lost film.
