= Madness of Youth =

1923 film directed by Jerome Storm

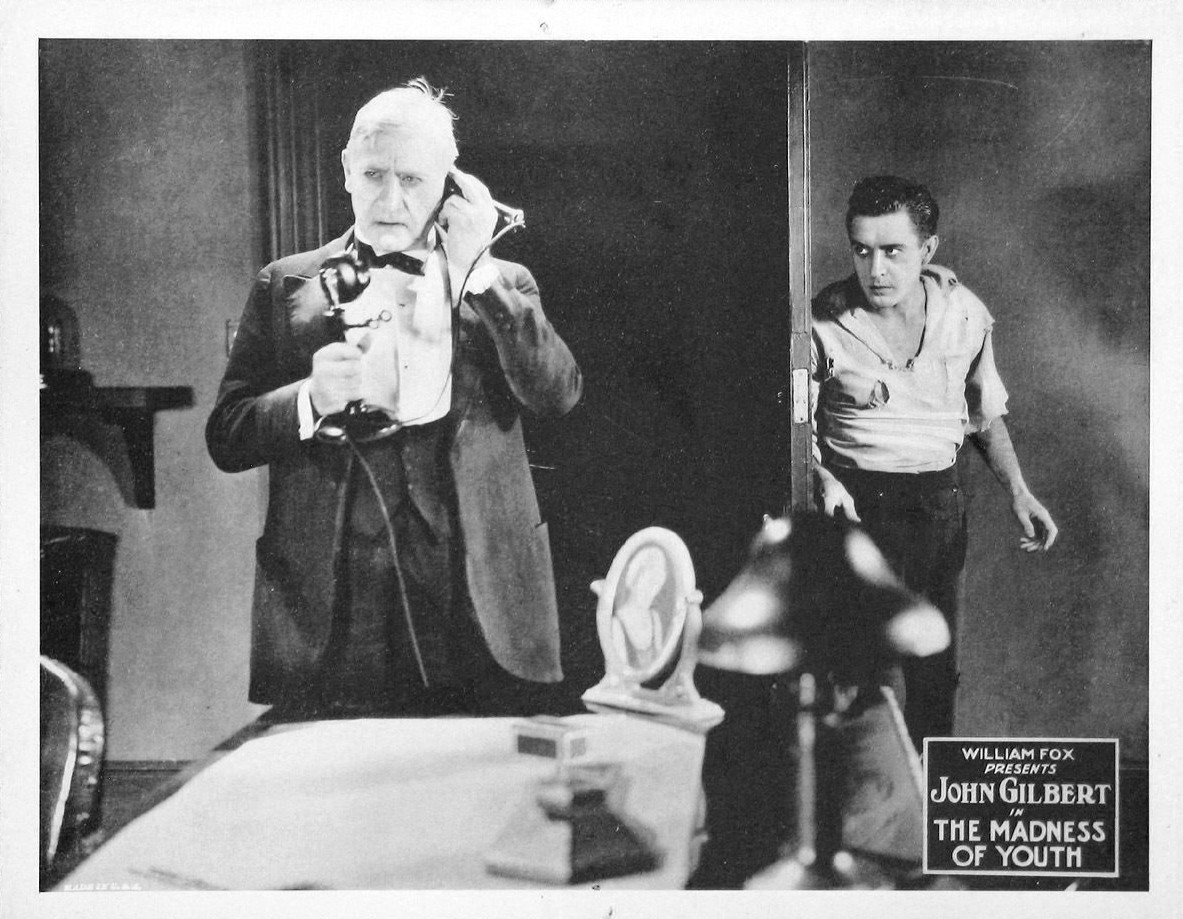
- Wilton Taylor and John Gilbert
- Directed by: Jerome Storm
- Written by: Joseph F. Poland; George F. Worts
- Produced by: William Fox
- Starring: John Gilbert; Billie Dove; George K. Arthur
- Cinematography: Joseph H. August
- Production company: Fox Film Corporation
- Distributed by: Fox Film Corporation
- Release date: April 8, 1923
- Running time: 50 minutes
- Country: United States
- Languages: Silent; English intertitles

Madness of Youth is a lost 1923 American silent drama film directed by Jerome Storm and starring John Gilbert, Billie Dove and George K. Arthur.

== Cast ==
- John Gilbert as Jaca Javalie
- Billie Dove as Nanette Banning
- D.R.O. Hatswell as Peter Reynolds
- George K. Arthur as Ted Banning
- Wilton Taylor as Theodore P. Banning
- Ruth Boyd as Madame Jeanne Banning
- Luke Lucas as Mason
- Julanne Johnston as The Dancer

== Bibliography ==
- Munden, Kenneth White. The American Film Institute Catalog of Motion Pictures Produced in the United States, Part 1. University of California Press, 1997.
