= William Orlamond =

Danish-American actor (1867–1957)

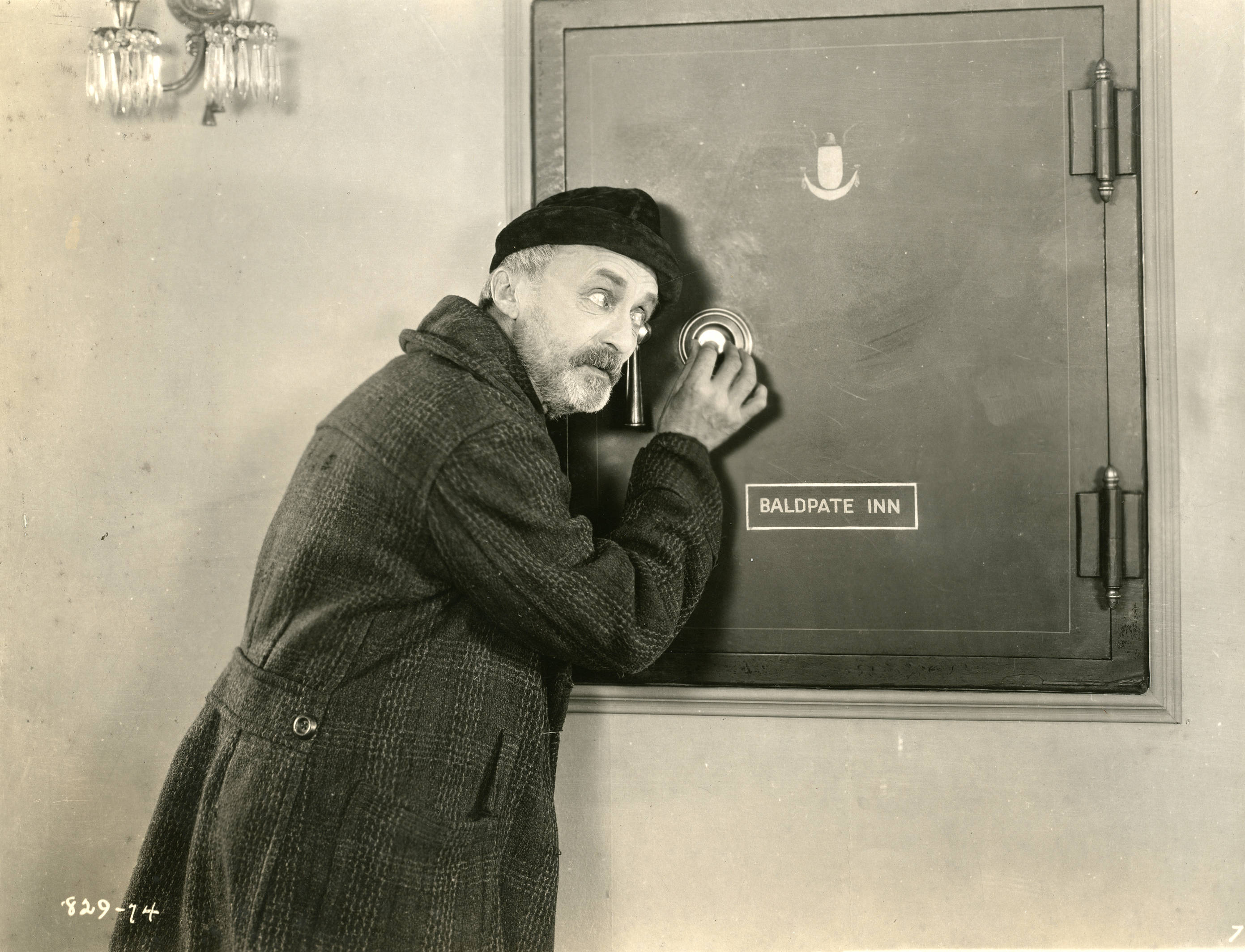
- William Orlamond as the Hermit in the lost film Seven Keys to Baldpate (1925)
- Born: William Anderson Orlamond; 1 August 1867; Copenhagen, Denmark
- Died: 23 April 1957 (aged 89); Los Angeles, California, U.S.
- Occupation: Actor
- Years active: 1912–1938

William Anderson Orlamond (1 August 1867 – 23 April 1957) was a Danish-American film actor. Orlamond appeared in more than 80 films between 1912 and 1938.

Orlamond delivered his finest performance in director Victor Sjöström’s masterpiece The Wind (1928) in the supporting role of “Sourdough.”

== Early life ==
Little is known about Orlamond's antecedents except that he was born in Copenhagen, Denmark, into a family of itinerant actors. He and his brother, Fritz, were included in the traveling acts virtually from infancy. When in his early 20s, he was supporting himself in Germany as a “dialect comedian.”

== Film career ==
The date of Orlamond's emigration to the United States is unclear, but by 1912 he was in Philadelphia, Pennsylvania working in one-reelers for Siegmund Lubin and appearing in Pathé and Edison Studios production shorts.

While under contract to Louis B. Meyer's Metro Pictures, Orlamond proved to be an able actor in supporting roles, both dramatic and comedic. He gave solid performances as Rudolph Valentino's father with Alla Nazimova in Camille (1921) and as Mosely, a textile baron in Nellie, the Beautiful Cloak Model (1924) starring Claire Windsor.

Orlamond provided a measure of levity to the over-wrought romance Flesh and the Devil (1926) as the inept but well-meaning Uncle Kutowski. In the film, which starred Greta Garbo and John Gilbert, Orlamond's brief appearance "receives one of the few laughs in the entire nine reels of nostril-flaring passion," according to film historian Hans J. Wollstein. The picture was exceptionally profitable to the newly amalgamated MGM.

Orlamond's "tour-de-force" performance as Sourdough in Victor Sjostrom's The Wind was the high water mark of his career. The "uncouth" Sourdough is among several characters who vie for the favor of Lillian Gish in her ingénue role as Letty. Wollstein reports that Orlamond "stole every scene he was in".

== Later life ==
With the advent of “talkies”, Orlamond's movie offers declined. His Danish accent, though largely anglicized, was contrary to his screen persona he had crafted in the silent era which represented strictly American social types. In 1931, he was cast as the Oklahoma homesteader "Grat Gotch" in Cimmaron, an uncredited role. His final film, Sworn Enemy (1936), was a minor role.

William Orlamond died April 23, 1957, at the age of 90.

== Partial filmography ==
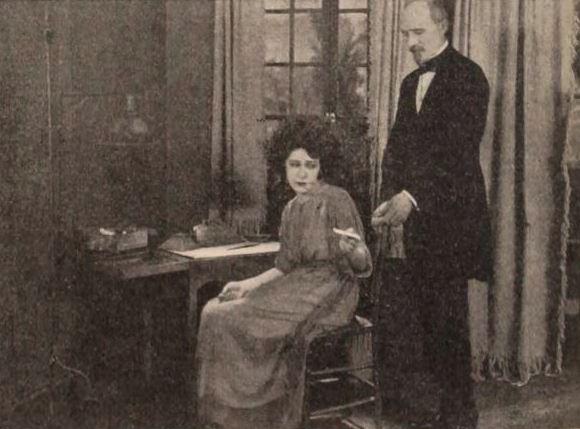
Alla Nazimova and William Orlamond in Camille (1921)

- A Rogue's Romance (1919)
- Elmo the Mighty (1919)
- Stronger Than Death (1920)
- Vanishing Trails (1920)
- Madame Peacock (1920)
- Camille (1921)
- Doubling for Romeo (1921)
- Beating the Game (1921)
- The Sin Flood (1922)
- All the Brothers Were Valiant (1923)
- Souls for Sale (1923)
- Slander the Woman (1923)
- The Eternal Three (1923)
- Slave of Desire (1923)
- The Eagle's Feather (1923)
- Look Your Best (1923)
- The Narrow Street (1924)
- Name the Man (1924)
- Nellie, the Beautiful Cloak Model (1924)
- The White Moth (1924)
- When a Girl Loves (1924)
- The Wife of the Centaur (1924)
- The Dixie Handicap (1924)
- Boys Will Be Joys (1925)
- Seven Keys to Baldpate (1925)
- Good Cheer (1926)
- That's My Baby (1926)
- Baby Clothes (1926)
- Up in Mabel's Room (1926)
- Mantrap (1926)
- Bromo and Juliet (1926)
- Kid Boots (1926)
- A Texas Steer (1927)
- See You in Jail (1927)
- Getting Gertie's Garter (1927)
- The Taxi Dancer (1927)
- The Red Mill (1927)
- Rose-Marie (1928)
- While the City Sleeps (1928)
- The Wind (1928)
- The Awakening (1928)
- Give and Take (1928)
- The Girl from Woolworth's (1929)
- Words and Music (1929)
- House of Horror (1929)
- The Way of All Men (1930)
- Are These Our Children (1931)
