= The Devil Dodger =

1917 film

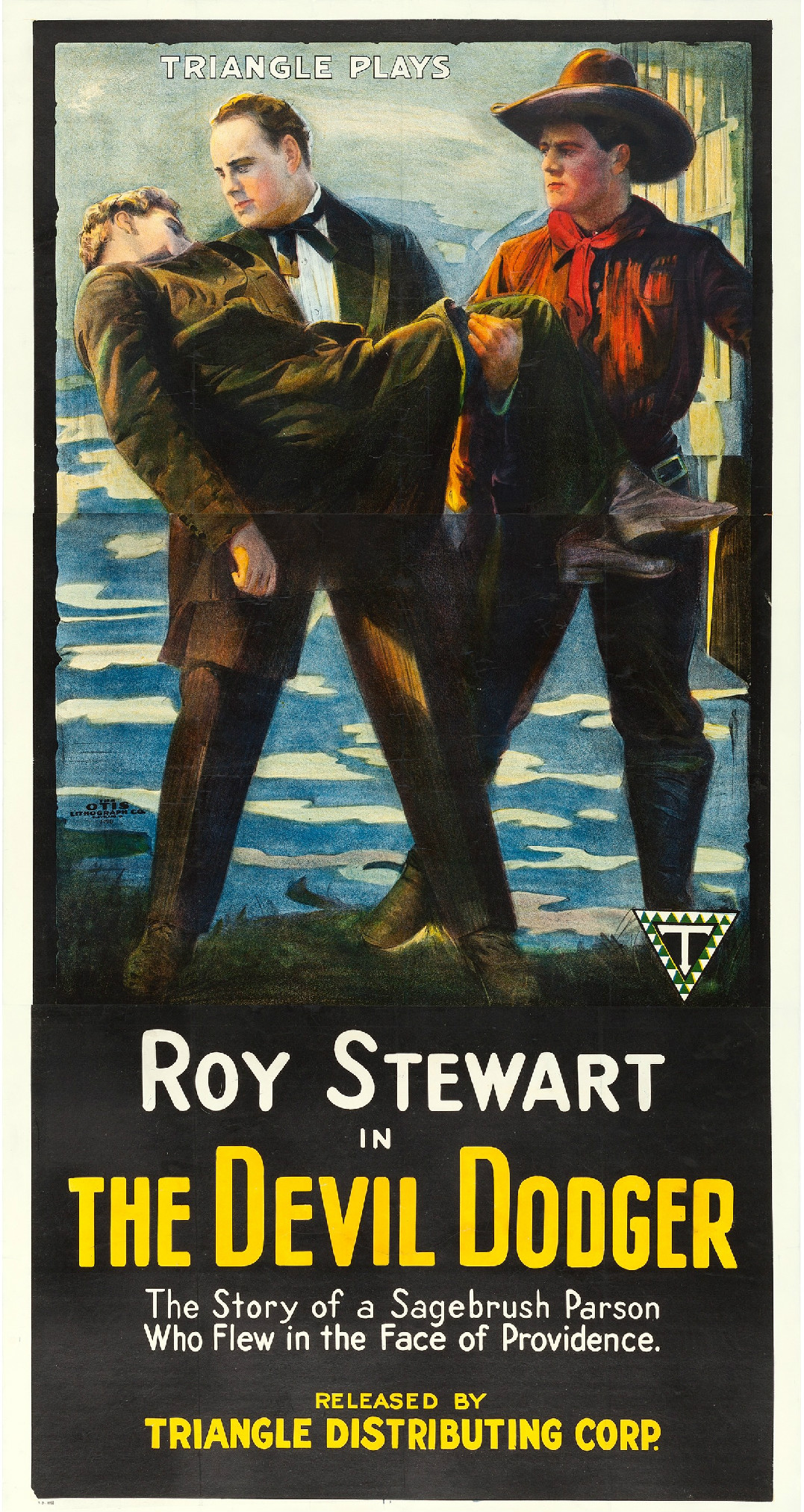
- poster
- Directed by: Clifford Smith
- Written by: J. G. Hawks
- Starring: Roy Stewart
- Production company: Triangle Film Corporation
- Distributed by: Triangle Film Company
- Release date: September 23, 1917
- Running time: 50 minutes
- Country: United States
- Languages: Silent; English intertitles

The Devil Dodger is a lost 1917 American silent Western film directed by Clifford Smith and starring Roy Stewart. It was produced and released by Triangle Film Corporation.

== Cast ==
- Roy Stewart as Silent Scott
- John Gilbert as Roger Ingraham (* Jack Gilbert)
- Carlyn Wagner as Fluffy
- John Lince as Ricketts
- Anna Dodge as Mrs. Ricketts
- George Willis as Bowie
- Belle Bennett as uncredited
- Josie Sedgwick as uncredited
