= John Gilbert (actor) =

American actor and film director (1897–1936)

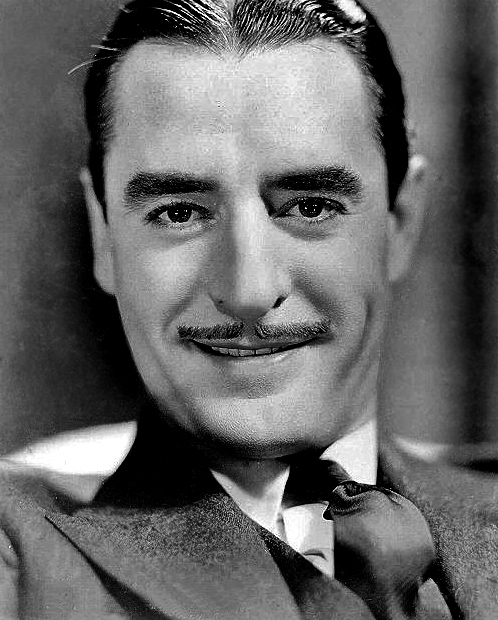
- Gilbert in 1931
- Born: John Cecil Pringle; July 10, 1897; Logan, Utah, U.S.
- Died: January 9, 1936 (aged 38); Los Angeles, California, U.S.
- Resting place: Forest Lawn Memorial Park, Glendale, California, U.S.
- Other name: Jack Gilbert
- Education: Hitchcock Military Academy
- Occupations: Actor; director; screenwriter
- Years active: 1914–1934
- Spouses: Olivia Burwell (m. 1918; div. 1921) Leatrice Joy (m. 1922; div. 1925) Ina Claire (m. 1929; div. 1931) Virginia Bruce (m. 1932; div. 1934)
- Children: 2

John Gilbert (born John Cecil Pringle; July 10, 1897 – January 9, 1936) was an American actor, screenwriter and director. He rose to fame during the silent era and became a popular leading man known as "The Great Lover". His breakthrough came in 1925 with his starring roles in The Merry Widow and The Big Parade. At the height of his career, Gilbert rivaled Rudolph Valentino as a box office draw.

Gilbert's career declined precipitously when silent pictures gave way to talkies, persistently attributed to his "squeaky voice". This has been called into question in later years, with his lower-class diction in speaking roles and personally-motivated studio interference providing alternative explanations. Gilbert is often cited as a high-profile example of an actor who was unsuccessful in making the transition to sound films.

== Early life and stage work ==
Born John Cecil Pringle in Logan, Utah, to stock-company actor parents, John George Pringle (1865–1929) and Ida Adair Apperly Gilbert (1877–1913), he struggled through a childhood of abuse and neglect, with his family moving frequently and young "Jack" having to attend assorted schools throughout the United States. When his family finally settled in California, he attended Hitchcock Military Academy in San Rafael. After he left school, Gilbert worked as a rubber goods salesman in San Francisco, then performed with the Baker Stock Company in Portland, Oregon, in 1914. He subsequently found work the following year as a stage manager in another stock company in Spokane, Washington, but he soon lost that job when the company went out of business.

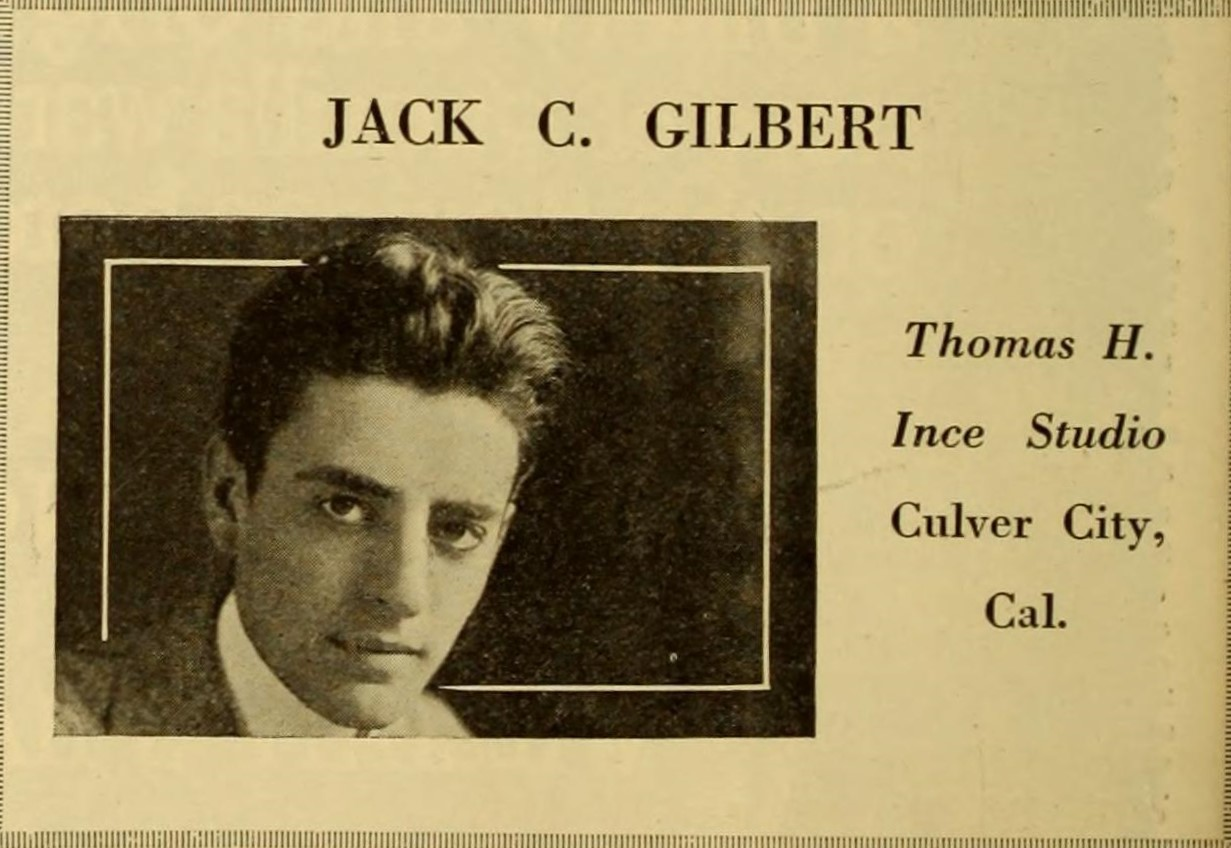
Promotion of Ince's rising "juvenile" star in studio directory, 1916

== Film career ==
After losing his stage job in 1915, Gilbert decided to try screen acting, and quickly gained work as a film extra through Herschell Mayall. Gilbert first appeared in The Mother Instinct (1915), a short directed by Wilfred Lucas. He then found work as an extra with the Thomas Ince Studios in productions such as The Coward (1915), Aloha Oe (1915), Civilization (1915), The Last Act (1916), and William Hart's Hell's Hinges (1916).

=== Kay-Bee Company ===
During his initial years in films, Gilbert also performed in releases by Kay-Bee Company such as Matrimony (1915), The Corner (1915), Eye of the Night (1916), and Bullets and Brown Eyes (1916). His first major costarring role was as Willie Hudson in The Apostle of Vengeance, also with William S. Hart. Viewed by studio executives as a promising but still "juvenile" actor at this stage of his career, Gilbert's contract salary was $40 a week ($1,183 today), fairly ample pay for most American workers in the early 1900s. Gilbert continued to get more substantial parts at Kay-Bee, which billed him as "Jack Gilbert" in The Aryan (1916), The Phantom (1916), Shell 43 (1916), The Sin Ye Do (1917), The Weaker Sex (1917), and The Bride of Hate (1917). His first true leading role was in Princess of the Dark (1917) with Enid Bennett, but the film was not a big success and he went back to supporting roles in The Dark Road (1917), Happiness (1917), The Millionaire Vagrant (1917), and The Hater of Men (1917).

=== Triangle Films and other studios ===
Gilbert went over to Triangle Films where he was in The Mother Instinct (1917), Golden Rule Kate (1917), The Devil Dodger (1917) (second billed), Up or Down? (1917), and Nancy Comes Home (1918). For Paralta Plays, Gilbert did Shackled (1918), One Dollar Bid (1918), and Wedlock (1918) and More Trouble (1918) for Anderson, but the company went bankrupt. He also was cast in Doing Their Bit (1918) at Fox and then returned to Triangle for The Mask (1918). Gilbert also did Three X Gordon (1918) for Jesse Hampton, The Dawn of Understanding (1918), The White Heather (1919) for Maurice Tourneur, The Busher (1919) for Thomas Ince, The Man Beneath for Haworth, A Little Brother of the Rich (1919) for Universal, The Red Viper (1919) for Tyrad, For a Woman's Honor (1919) for Jess Hampton, Widow by Proxy (1919) for Paramount, Heart o' the Hills (1919) for Mary Pickford, and Should a Woman Tell? (1919) for Screen Classics.

=== Actor, screenwriter and director for Tourneur ===
Maurice Tourneur signed him to a contract to both write and act in films. Gilbert performed in and co-wrote The White Circle (1920), The Great Redeemer (1921), and Deep Waters (1921). As a writer only, he worked on The Bait (1921), which starred and was produced by Hope Hampton. For Hampton, Gilbert wrote and directed as well, but he did not appear in Love's Penalty (1921).

=== Fox and stardom ===
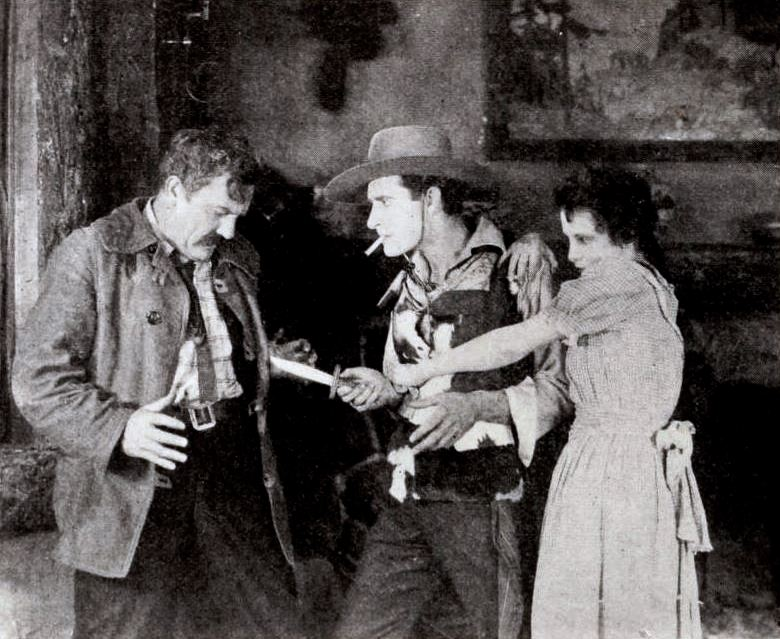
Gilbert (center) with Barbara Bedford and unidentified actor in Gleam O'Dawn (1922)

In 1921, Gilbert signed a three-year contract with Fox Film Corporation, which subsequently cast him in romantic leading roles and promoted him now as "John Gilbert". The actor's first starring part for the studio was in Shame (1921). He followed it with leading roles in Arabian Love (1922), Gleam O'Dawn (1922), The Yellow Stain (1922), Honor First (1922), Monte Cristo (1922), Calvert's Valley (1922), The Love Gambler (1922), and A California Romance (1922). Many of the scenarios for these films were written by Jules Furthman.

Gilbert returned temporarily to Tourneur to costar with Lon Chaney in While Paris Sleeps (1923). Back at Fox, he starred in Truxton King (1923), Madness of Youth (1923), St. Elmo (1923), and The Exiles (1923). The same year he starred in Cameo Kirby (1923), directed by John Ford, co starring Jean Arthur. He went into The Wolf Man (1923) with Norma Shearer, not a horror film, but the story of a man who believes he murdered his fiancée's brother while drunk. Gilbert also performed in his last films for Fox in 1924, including Just Off Broadway, A Man's Mate, The Lone Chance, and Romance Ranch.

=== Metro-Goldwyn-Mayer ===
Under the auspices of movie producer Irving Thalberg, Gilbert obtained a release from his Fox contract and moved to MGM, where he became a full-fledged star cast in major productions. First starring in His Hour (1924) directed by King Vidor and written by Elinor Glyn his film career entered its ascendancy. He followed this success with He Who Gets Slapped (1924) co-starring Chaney and Shearer and directed by Victor Sjöström; The Snob (1924) with Shearer; The Wife of the Centaur (1924) for Vidor.

The next year, Gilbert would star in two of MGM's most critically acclaimed and popular film productions of the silent era: Erich von Stroheim's The Merry Widow and King Vidor's The Big Parade.

==== The Merry Widow (1925) ====
Gilbert was assigned to star in Erich von Stroheim's The Merry Widow by Irving Thalberg, over the objections of the Austrian-American director. Von Stroheim expressed his displeasure bluntly to his leading man: "Gilbert, I am forced to use you in my picture. I do not want you, but the decision was not in my hands. I assure you I will do everything in my power to make you comfortable." Gilbert, mortified, soon stalked off the set in a rage, tearing off his costume. Von Stroheim followed him to his dressing room and apologized. The two agreed to share a drink. Then Gilbert apologized and they had another drink. The tempest subsided and was resolved amicably. According to Gilbert, the contretemps served to "cement a relationship which for my part will never end."

The public adulation that Gilbert experienced with his growing celebrity astounded him: "Everywhere I hear whispers and gasps in acknowledgment of my presence...[t]he whole thing became too fantastic for me to comprehend. Acting, the very thing I had been fighting and ridiculing for seven years, had brought me success, riches and renown. I was a great motion picture artist. Well, I'll be damned!"

==== The Big Parade (1925) ====
Gilbert was next cast by Thalberg to star in King Vidor's war-romance The Big Parade (1925), which became the second-highest grossing silent film and the most profitable film of the silent era. Gilbert's "inspired performance" as an American doughboy in France during World War I was the high point of his acting career. He fully immersed himself in the role of Jim Apperson, a Southern gentleman who, with two working class comrades, experiences the horrors of trench warfare. Gilbert declared: "No love has ever enthralled me as did the making of this picture...All that has followed is balderdash." Gilbert "gave a performance that ranks as one of the finest of the entire silent period"; according to Vidor, he "never had dirty fingernails before, and he’d never done a part without makeup before. Then he found that he liked it."

The following year, Vidor reunited Gilbert with two of his co-stars from that picture, Renée Adorée and Karl Dane, for the film La Bohème (1926) which also starred Lillian Gish. He then did another with Vidor, Bardelys the Magnificent (1926).

=== Greta Garbo ===
In 1926, Gilbert made Flesh and the Devil, his first film with Greta Garbo. Gilbert first encountered Garbo on the set during filming of the railway station scene, and the chemistry between the two was evidently instantaneous. Director Clarence Brown remarked approvingly that he "had a love affair going for me that you couldn't beat, any way you tried." Garbo and Gilbert soon began a highly publicized romance, much to the delight of their fans and to MGM.

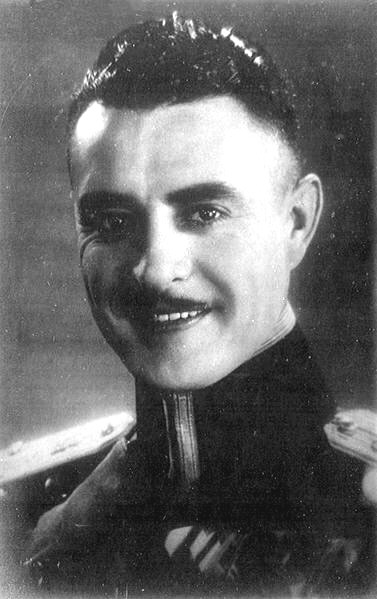
Publicity photo for Love (1927)

He made The Show (1927) with Adoree for Tod Browning then did Twelve Miles Out (1927) with Joan Crawford and Man, Woman and Sin (1927) with Jeanne Eagels.

Gilbert was reunited with Garbo in a modern adaptation of Tolstoy's 19th-century novel, Anna Karenina. The title was changed to Love (1927) to capitalize on the real life love affair of the stars and advertised by MGM as "Garbo and Gilbert in Love."

Though officially directed by Edmund Goulding, Gilbert, though uncredited, was responsible for directing the love scenes involving Garbo. He was perhaps the only person in the industry whose "artistic judgment" she fully respected. As such, MGM approved of this arrangement. Garbo "looked for approval from Gilbert after every scene. If he failed to nod, Garbo refused to continue, so MGM found it simpler to let Gilbert direct...over half the production."

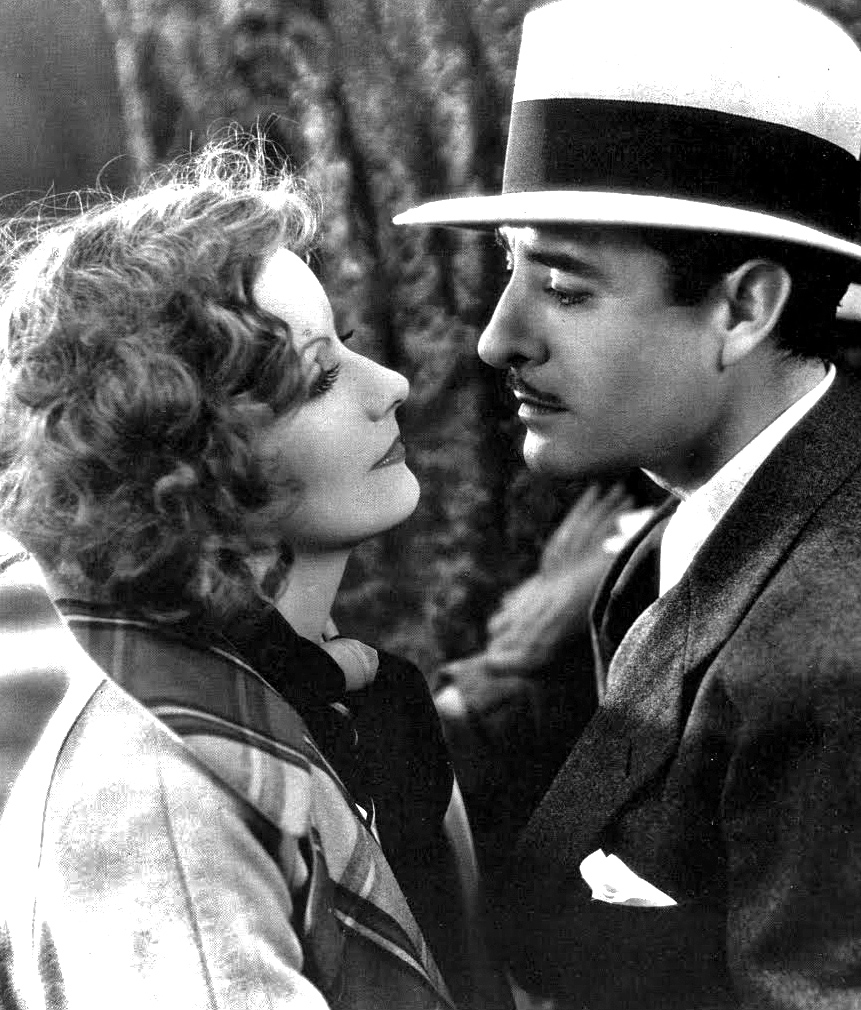
Gilbert with Garbo in A Woman of Affairs (1928)

Gilbert made The Cossacks (1928) with Adoree; Four Walls (1928) with Crawford; Show People (1928) with Marion Davies for Vidor, in which Gilbert only had a cameo; and The Masks of the Devil (1928) for Victor Sjöström.

Gilbert and Garbo were teamed for a third time in A Woman of Affairs (1928). His last silent film was Desert Nights (1929).

=== Sound era ===
With the coming of sound, Gilbert's vocal talents made a good first impression, although the studio had failed to conduct a voice test. The conventional wisdom of the day dictated that actors in the new talkies should emulate the "pear-shaped tones" of stage acting. Gilbert's strict adherence to that method produced an affected delivery that made audiences giggle, rather than any particularity in Gilbert's natural speech.

Gilbert signed an immensely lucrative multi-picture contract with MGM in 1928 that totaled $1,500,000. The terms of the agreement positioned MGM executives Irving Thalberg and Nicholas Schenck, both sympathetic to the star, to supervise his career. According to Kevin Brownlow, the contract was designed to protect Gilbert from studio head Louis B. Mayer, who Schenck was himself in a feud with, but instead drew Mayer's ire. Gilbert frequently clashed with Mayer over creative, social and financial matters. A confrontation between the two men, which became physical, occurred at the planned double-wedding of Garbo and Gilbert and director King Vidor and actress Eleanor Boardman. Mayer reportedly made a crude remark to Gilbert about Garbo, and Gilbert reacted by knocking Mayer to the floor with his fist. While that story has been disputed or dismissed as hearsay by some historians, Vidor's bride, Eleanor Boardman, insisted that she personally witnessed the altercation.

In the all-star musical comedy The Hollywood Revue of 1929 (1929), Gilbert and Norma Shearer played the balcony scene from Shakespeare's Romeo and Juliet, first as written, then followed with a slang rendition of the scene. The comic effect served to mitigate any negative reaction to Gilbert's initial delivery.

==== His Glorious Night ====
Audiences awaited further romantic roles from Gilbert on the talking screen. The next vehicle was the Ruritanian romance His Glorious Night (1929), directed by Lionel Barrymore. According to reviewers, audiences laughed nervously at Gilbert's performance. The offense was not Gilbert's voice, but the awkward scenario along with the overly ardent love scenes. In one, Gilbert keeps kissing his leading lady, (Catherine Dale Owen), while saying "I love you" over and over again. The scene was parodied in the MGM musical Singin' in the Rain (1952), in which a preview of the fictional The Dueling Cavalier flops disastrously, and again in Babylon (2022).

Director King Vidor speculated that, had he lived, the late Rudolph Valentino, Gilbert's main rival for romantic leads in the silent era, probably would have suffered the same fate in the talkie era. It was Gilbert's inept phrasing, his "dreadful enunciation" and the "inane" script as the genuine sources of his poor performance, that drew "titters" from audiences.

==== "Squeaky voice" myth ====
The persistent myth that John Gilbert had a "squeaky voice" that doomed his career in sound films, first emerged from his 1929 performance in His Glorious Night. According to Brownlow, Gilbert "experienced a humiliating plunge from popularity". He reports that Gilbert's sound recordings for His Glorious Night were marred by his "dreadful enunciation" of his lines, a matter of that could have been corrected with elocution coaching and a better script, and not his natural voice which "was quite low". Brownlow also asserts that "the quality of [Gilbert's voice]...compared well with that of co-star Conrad Nagel, regarded as having one of the best voices for sound."

Meanwhile, Gilbert's relationship with MGM deteriorated. He was "subjected to one poor picture after another" and suffered "attempts at [his] humiliation, aimed at forcing him to quit" so as to breach his lucrative contract. It was even rumored that Louis B. Mayer ordered Gilbert's voice to be gelded, by manipulating the sound track, to give it a higher, less masculine pitch. Later, after analyzing the film's sound track, Brownlow found that the timbre and frequency of Gilbert's speaking scenes in His Glorious Night were no different than in his subsequent talkies. From that analysis, Brownlow also reported that Gilbert's voice, overall, was "quite low". With regard to the alleged manipulation of Gilbert's footage by Mayer or by anyone else, television technicians in the 1960s determined that the actor's voice was consistent with those of other performers on the same print, casting doubt that any targeted "sabotaging" of Gilbert's voice had occurred.

Film critic John Baxter described Gilbert as having "a light speaking voice", a minor defect that both MGM and the star "magnified into an obsession." Despite any conflicting opinions or myths surrounding the actor's voice, Mayer's lingering resentment and hostility toward Gilbert remained apparent, especially after MGM's star signed a new contract for six pictures at $250,000 each. Those ill feelings fueled additional speculation that Mayer deliberately assigned Gilbert bad scripts and ineffective directors in an effort to void the contract.

=== Decline ===
Metro-Goldwyn-Mayer cast Gilbert in a film adaptation of The Living Corpse by Tolstoy re-titled as Redemption (1929). The bleak atmosphere and maudlin dialogue presaged the disaster looming in the star's personal life and career. Gilbert's confident screen presence had vanished, while his use of the exaggerated stage diction that elicited laughs from the audience persisted.

MGM put him in a more rugged film, Way for a Sailor (1930) with Wallace Beery. He followed it with Gentleman's Fate (1931). Gilbert became increasingly depressed by progressively inferior films and idle stretches between productions. Despite efforts by studio executives at MGM to cancel his contract, Gilbert refused to walk out on his MGM contract despite "harassment" and being "no longer on speaking terms with Louis B, Mayer". Gilbert was "subjected to one poor picture after another" and suffered "attempts at [his] humiliation, aimed at forcing him to quit" so as to breach his lucrative contract.

Gilbert's fortunes were temporarily restored when MGM's production chief Irving Thalberg gave him two projects that were character studies, giving Gilbert an excellent showcase for his versatility. The Phantom of Paris (1931), originally intended for Lon Chaney (who died from cancer in 1930), cast Gilbert as a debonair magician and showman who is falsely accused of murder and uses his mastery of disguise to unmask the real killer.

Downstairs (1932) was based on Gilbert's original story, with the actor playing against type as a scheming, blackmailing chauffeur. The films were well received by critics and fans but failed to revive his career. In between, he appeared in West of Broadway (1931). Shortly after making Downstairs, he married co-star Virginia Bruce; the couple divorced in 1934.

Gilbert fulfilled his contract with MGM with a perfunctory "B" picture – Fast Workers (1933) directed by Browning. He left the studio in 1933, terminating his $10,000 a week contract.

Exhausted and demoralized by his humiliations at MGM and his declining success at the box office, Gilbert began to drink heavily, contributing to his declining physical and mental health.

=== Queen Christina (1933) ===
Gilbert announced his retirement from acting and was working at Fox as an "honorary" director when, in August 1933, he announced he had signed a seven-year contract with MGM at $75–100,000 a picture. The reason was Greta Garbo insisted that Gilbert return to MGM to play her leading man in Queen Christina (1933), directed by Rouben Mamoulian. Garbo was top-billed, with Gilbert's name beneath the title. Queen Christina, though a critical success, did not revive Gilbert's poor self-image or his career. Garbo was reported to have dropped the young Laurence Olivier scheduled to play the part, but Mamoulian recalled that Olivier's screen tests had already eliminated him from consideration.

== Comeback ==
In 1934 Harry Cohn, head of then low-budgeted Columbia Pictures, gave Gilbert what would be his final chance for a comeback in The Captain Hates the Sea. Cohn was always on the alert for current stars who had been dropped by other studios, so that he could sign them for their name value. He also wanted to show, as author Bob Thomas noted, that he could succeed with an MGM castoff: "Never was Cohn more satisfied than when he could score some such victory over M-G-M." Director Lewis Milestone guided Gilbert through a screen test, which impressed both Milestone and Cohn. Cohn told Gilbert, "If you keep your nose clean on this picture, I'll see that you get work. I'll go to bat for you with every producer in town." Gilbert's conduct was exemplary for two weeks, until self-doubts came to the surface, resulting in drunken episodes and ulcer flare-ups. Gilbert's resolve was further weakened by other cast members (Victor McLaglen, Walter Connolly, Walter Catlett, and Leon Errol) plying Gilbert with cocktails and encouraging his alcoholism. "It's too goddam bad," muttered Cohn, "but if a man wants to go to hell I can't stop him." Gilbert completed the film, giving a capable performance as "a dissipated, bitter [and] cynical" playwright, but it failed to revive his career. It was his last film.

Biographer Kevin Brownlow's eulogy to John Gilbert considers the destruction of both the man and his career:

The career of John Gilbert indicates that the star, and the person playing the star, were regarded by producers as separate entities, subject to totally different attitudes. Gilbert, as an ordinary human being, had no legal right to the stardom that was the sole property of the studio. When Gilbert, as an employee, tried to seize control of the future of Gilbert the star, the studios decided to save their investment from falling into the hands of rivals, [so] they had to wreck their property. Other properties – books, films, sets – could be destroyed with impunity. But the destruction of a star carried with it the destruction of a person…it seems somewhat abhorrent that it took such tragedies as that of John Gilbert to bring us our entertainment

== Personal life ==
Gilbert was married four times. His first marriage, on August 26, 1918, was to Olivia Burwell, a native of Mississippi whom Gilbert had met after her family moved to California. They separated the following year and Burwell returned to Mississippi for a while. She filed for divorce in Los Angeles in 1921.

In February 1921, Gilbert announced his engagement to actress Leatrice Joy. They married in Tijuana in November 1921. As Gilbert had failed to secure a divorce from his first wife and the legality of Gilbert and Joy's Mexican marriage was questionable, the couple separated and had the marriage annulled to avoid a scandal. They remarried March 3, 1922. The marriage was tumultuous, and Joy filed for legal separation in June 1923 when she claimed Gilbert slapped her face after a night of heavy drinking. They reconciled several months later. In August 1924, Joy, who was pregnant with the couple's daughter, filed for divorce. Joy later said she left Gilbert after discovering he was having an affair with actress Laurette Taylor. Joy also claimed Gilbert had affairs with Barbara La Marr (with whom he had a romance before his marriage to Joy), Lila Lee and Bebe Daniels. Gilbert and Joy had a daughter, Leatrice Gilbert (later Fountain; September 4, 1924 – January 20, 2015). Joy was granted a divorce in May 1925.

In 1929, Gilbert eloped with actress Ina Claire to Las Vegas. They separated in February 1931 and divorced six months later. Gilbert's fourth and final marriage was on August 10, 1932, to actress Virginia Bruce, who had recently costarred with him on the MGM film Downstairs. The entertainment trade paper The Film Daily reported that their "quick" wedding was held in Gilbert's dressing room on the MGM lot while Bruce was working on another studio production, Kongo. Among the people attending the small ceremony were the head of MGM production Irving Thalberg, who served as Gilbert's best man; screenwriter Donald Ogden Stewart, whose wife Beatrice acted as Bruce's matron of honor; MGM art director and set designer Cedric Gibbons; and his wife, actress Dolores del Río. Bruce retired briefly from acting following the birth of their daughter Susan Ann; however, she resumed her career after her divorce from Gilbert in May 1934.

Before his death, Gilbert dated actress Marlene Dietrich from 1935 until his death in 1936 as well as Greta Garbo from 1926 to 1927. When he died, he had recently been slated to play a prominent supporting role in Dietrich's film Desire.

== Death ==
By 1934, alcoholism had severely damaged Gilbert's health. He suffered a serious heart attack in December 1935, which left him in even worse condition. A second heart attack on January 9, 1936, at his Bel Air home, was fatal.

A private funeral was held on January 11 at the B.E. Mortuary in Beverly Hills. Among the mourners were Gilbert's two ex-wives, Leatrice Joy and Virginia Bruce, his two daughters, and stars Marlene Dietrich, Gary Cooper, Myrna Loy, and Raquel Torres.

Gilbert was cremated and his ashes were interred at Forest Lawn Memorial Park, Glendale in Glendale, California.

Gilbert left the bulk of his estate, valued at $363,494 (equivalent to $8.43 million in 2025), to his last ex-wife Virginia Bruce and their daughter, Susan Ann. He left $10,000 to his elder daughter Leatrice, and other amounts to friends, relatives and his servants.

For his contribution to the motion picture industry, Gilbert has a star on the Hollywood Walk of Fame at 1755 Vine Street. In 1994, he was honored with his image on a United States postage stamp designed by caricaturist Al Hirschfeld.

== Filmography ==
Year	Films	Role	Notes
1915	The Coward	Minor role	Uncredited
1915	Matrimony	Extra	Lost film Uncredited
1915	Aloha Oe	Extra	Lost film Uncredited
1916	The Corner	Extra	Lost film Uncredited
1916	Bullets and Brown Eyes		Lost film
1916	The Last Act	Extra	Lost film Uncredited
1916	Hell's Hinges	Rowdy townsman	Uncredited
1916	The Aryan	Extra	Uncredited
1916	Civilization	Extra	Uncredited
1916	The Apostle of Vengeance	Willie Hudson	Lost film
1916	The Phantom	Bertie Bereton	Lost film
1916	Eye of the Night		Uncredited
1916	Shell 43	English Spy	Lost film
1916	The Sin Ye Do	Jimmy	Lost film
1917	The Weaker Sex		Lost film
1917	The Bride of Hate	Dr. Duprez's Son	Lost film
1917	Princess of the Dark	"Crip" Halloran	Lost film
1917	The Dark Road	Cedric Constable	Lost film
1917	Happiness	Richard Forrester	Credited as Jack Gilbert
1917	The Millionaire Vagrant	James Cricket	
1917	The Hater of Men	Billy Williams	
1917	The Mother Instinct	Jean Coutierre	Lost film
1917	Golden Rule Kate	The Heller	
1917	The Devil Dodger	Roger Ingraham	Lost film
1917	Up or Down?	Allan Corey	Lost film
1918	Nancy Comes Home	Phil Ballou	Lost film Credited as Jack Gilbert
1918	Shackled	James Ashley	Lost film Credited as Jack Gilbert
1918	More Trouble	Harvey Deering	Lost film Credited as Jack Gilbert
1918	One Dollar Bid		Lost film Credited as Jack Gilbert
1918	Wedlock	Granger Hollister	Lost film Credited as Jack Gilbert
1918	Doing Their Bit		Lost film Credited as Jack Gilbert
1918	The Mask	Billy Taylor	Lost film Credited as Jack Gilbert
1918	Three X Gordon	Archie	Lost film Credited as Jack Gilbert
1918	The Dawn of Understanding	Ira Beasly	Lost film Credited as Jack Gilbert
1919	The White Heather	Dick Beach	Credited as Jack Gilbert
1919	The Busher	Jim Blair	Credited as Jack Gilbert
1919	The Man Beneath	James Bassett	Credited as Jack Gilbert
1919	A Little Brother of the Rich	Carl Wilmerding	Lost film
1919	The Red Viper	Dick Grant	Lost film Credited as Jack Gilbert
1919	For a Woman's Honor	Dick Rutherford	Lost film
1919	Widow by Proxy	Jack Pennington	Lost film Credited as Jack Gilbert
1919	Heart o' the Hills	Gray Pendleton	Credited as Jack Gilbert
1919	Should a Woman Tell?	The Villain	Credited as Jack Gilbert
1920	The White Circle	Frank Cassilis	Lost film Credited as Jack Gilbert; Writer
1920	The Great Redeemer	Undetermined role	Lost film Uncredited; Adaptation
1920	Deep Waters	Bill Lacey	Lost film Credited as Jack Gilbert; Writer
1921	The Servant in the House	Percival	Lost film Credited as Jack Gilbert
1921	The Bait	–	Lost film Writer
1921	Love's Penalty	–	Lost film Writer, director, editor
1921	Shame	William Fielding/David Field	Lost film
1921	Ladies Must Live	The Gardener	Lost film Credited as Jack Gilbert
1922	Gleam O'Dawn	Gleam O'Dawn	Lost film
1922	Arabian Love	Norman Stone	Lost film
1922	The Yellow Stain	Donald Keith	Lost film
1922	Honor First	Jacques Dubois/Honoré Duboois	Lost film
1922	Monte Cristo	Edmond Dantes, Count of Monte Cristo	
1922	Calvert's Valley	Page Emlyn	Lost film Credited as Jack Gilbert
1922	The Love Gambler	Dick Manners	Lost film
1922	A California Romance	Don Patricio Fernando	Lost film
1923	While Paris Sleeps	Dennis O'Keefe	Lost film
1923	Truxton King	Truxton King	Lost film
1923	Madness of Youth	Jaca Javalie	Lost film
1923	St. Elmo	St. Elmo Thornton	Lost film
1923	The Exiles	Henry Holcombe	Lost film
1924	Just Off Broadway	Stephen Moore	Lost film
1924	The Wolf Man	Gerald Stanley	Lost film
1924	A Man's Mate	Paul	Lost film
1924	The Lone Chance	Jack Saunders	Lost film
1924	Romance Ranch	Carlos Brent	Lost film
1924	His Hour	Gritzko	
1924	Married Flirts	Guest at party	Cameo appearance Lost film
1924	He Who Gets Slapped	Bezano	
1924	The Snob	Eugene Curry	Lost film
1924	The Wife of the Centaur	Jeffrey Dwyer	Lost film
1925	The Merry Widow	Prince Danilo Petrovich	
1925	The Big Parade	James Apperson	
1925	Ben-Hur: A Tale of the Christ	Crowd extra in chariot race	Uncredited
1926	La Bohème	Rodolphe	
1926	Bardelys the Magnificent	Bardelys	
1926	Flesh and the Devil	Leo von Harden	
1927	The Show	Cock Robin	
1927	Twelve Miles Out	Jerry Fay	
1927	Man, Woman and Sin	Albert Whitcomb	
1927	Love	Captain Count Alexei Vronsky	Director (uncredited)
1928	The Cossacks	Lukashka	
1928	Four Walls	Benny Horowitz	Lost film
1928	Show People	Himself	Cameo appearance Uncredited
1928	The Masks of the Devil	Baron Reiner	Lost film
1928	A Woman of Affairs	Neville "Nevs" Holderness	
1929	Desert Nights	Hugh Rand	Last silent film
1929	His Glorious Night	Captain Kovacs	Sound film debut
1929	The Hollywood Revue of 1929	Himself	
1930	Redemption	Fedya	
1930	Way for a Sailor	Jack	
1931	Gentleman's Fate	Giacomo Tomasulo/Jack Thomas	
1931	The Phantom of Paris	Chéri-Bibi	
1931	West of Broadway	Jerry Seevers	
1932	Downstairs	Karl Schneider	Story
1933	Fast Workers	Gunner Smith	
1933	Queen Christina	Antonio	
1934	The Captain Hates the Sea	Steve Bramley	

== Fictional portrayals ==
Gilbert has been portrayed in several films. Barry Bostwick appeared as the actor in the television film The Silent Lovers first shown in 1980. He has also been portrayed by his grandson, John Fountain, in Sunset (1988), Christopher Renstrom in La Divina (1989), and Adnan Taletovich in Return to Babylon (2012). Gilbert was the inspiration behind the character of George Valentin, played by Jean Dujardin in The Artist (2011), and Jack Conrad, played by Brad Pitt in Babylon (2022).

== Sources ==
- Baxter, John. 1970. Hollywood in the Thirties. International Film Guide Series. Paperback Library, New York. LOC Card Number 68–24003.
- Baxter, John. 1976. King Vidor. Simon & Schuster, Inc. Monarch Film Studies. LOC Card Number 75–23544.
- Brownlow, Kevin and Kobal, John. 1979. Hollywood: The Pioneers. Alfred A. Knopf Inc. A Borzoi Book, New York. ISBN 0-394-50851-3
- Koszarski, Richard. 1983. The Man You Loved to Hate: Erich von Stroheim and Hollywood. Oxford University Press. ISBN 0-19-503239-X
- Laurier, Joanne. 2011. The Artist: An amiable gimmick. The World Socialist Web Site. Retrieved May 26, 2020. https://www.wsws.org/en/articles/2012/01/arti-j07.html
- Phillips, Richard. 2009. Several movies well worth revisiting: Sydney Film Festival 2009. World Socialist Web Site. Retrieved May 24, 2020.https://www.wsws.or g/en/articles/2009/07/sff5-j17.html
- Reinhardt, Bernd. 2020. Rediscovering Hallelujah (1929), director King Vidor's sensitive film with all-black cast: 70th Berlin International Film Festival. World Socialist Web Site. Retrieved May 24, 2020. https://www.wsws.org/en/articles/2020/04/07/ber2-a07.html
