= While Paris Sleeps (1923 film) =

1923 film by Maurice Tourneur

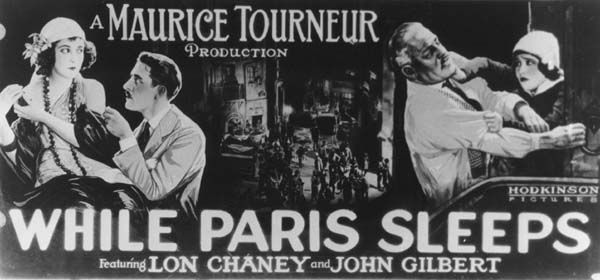
- Poster
- Directed by: Maurice Tourneur
- Written by: Wyndham Gittens
- Based on: The Glory of Love by Leslie Beresford
- Produced by: Maurice Tourneur
- Starring: Lon Chaney; John Gilbert; Mildred Manning; Hardee Kirkland
- Cinematography: René Guissart
- Distributed by: W. W. Hodkinson Corporation
- Release date: January 21, 1923
- Running time: 54 minutes (6 reels)
- Country: United States
- Language: Silent (English intertitles)

While Paris Sleeps, aka The Glory of Love, is a 1923 American silent drama film based on the novel The Glory of Love by Leslie Beresford (a.k.a. "Pan"), directed by Maurice Tourneur, and starring Lon Chaney and John Gilbert. Whoever wrote the screenplay adaptation went uncredited, but some sources claim it was Wyndham Gittens. Special effects were by Floyd Mueller.

The film was actually made in 1920 under the title The Glory of Love, but for some unknown reason, it was only released in 1923, with the title inexplicably changed to While Paris Sleeps. It is likely the film's gruesome content may have caused its release to be held up for so long. The film was apparently never copyrighted properly. Tourneur may have bought the picture outright from whoever owned it and released it himself in 1923 under the new title.

The film is now believed to be lost. A still exists showing Chaney in the role of the sculptor Henri Santodos, and online is shown the poster.

== Plot ==
Henri Santados is an insane sculptor living in Paris and working in a wax museum owned by Father Marionette. Santados is in love with his model, Bebe Larvache, who cares nothing for him. When Bebe meets a wealthy American, Dennis O'Keefe, they fall in love. A jealous Santados teams up with Father Marionette and together they plot to get rid of O'Keefe.

Meanwhile, O'Keefe's father, who strenuously objects to the relationship, convinces Bebe to stay away from his son for his own good. She asks his permission to spend one final night with Dennis at the Mardi Gras Festival. O'Keefe goes to pick Ms. Larvache up at the studio but Santados maneuvers her into a compromising position to make O'Keefe believe that she is cheating on him.

As the heartbroken O'Keefe leaves, he is kidnapped by Father Marionette, who tortures him in a back room of the wax museum. Marionette calls Santados, and Bebe hears O'Keefe moaning in pain on the phone. A friend of O'Keefe's, Georges Morier, manages to rescue him in time and rush him to the hospital. Santados is killed during the rescue and the lovers are reunited. O'Keefe's father finally consents to the marriage.

== Cast ==
- Lon Chaney as Santados, the mad sculptor
- Jack F. MacDonald as Father Marionette
- Mildred Manning as Bebe Larvache
- John Gilbert as Dennis O'Keefe
- Hardee Kirkland as Dennis's father
- J. Farrell MacDonald as George Morier
- Fred Gamble as visitor at House of Horrors

== Production ==
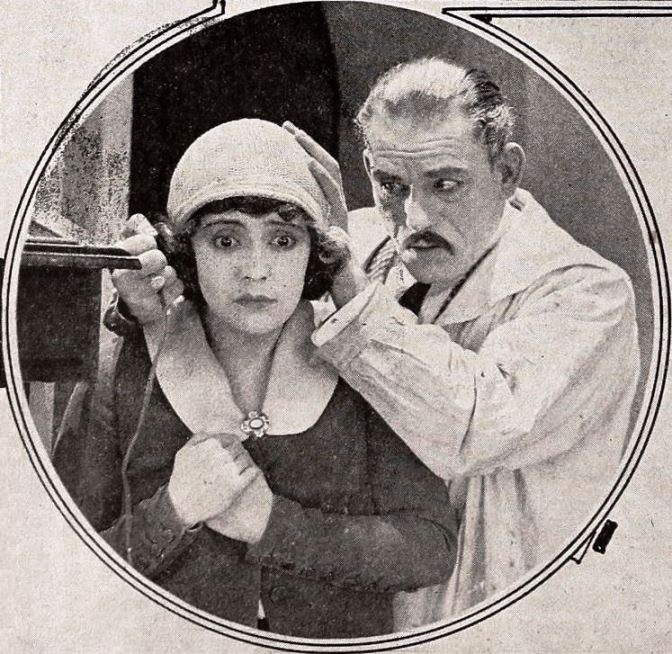
Mildred Manning and Lon Chaney in the film

Tourneur shot the film in 1920 under the title The Glory of Love, but perhaps due to its gruesome nature, he was not able to get it released for three years. In 1923, the W. W. Hodkinson Corporation distributed the film theatrically after changing the title to While Paris Sleeps. They probably wanted to distribute it since the star of the film, Lon Chaney, had managed to achieve great notoriety in Hollywood during the preceding three years, starring in films such as A Blind Bargain, Outside the Law and The Penalty. Critics commented that the film "has all the appearances of a picture that might have been made three or four years ago", and they were right. Even the running time is shorter than Chaney's other 1923 films.

Lon Chaney reunited with John Gilbert in 1924 in He Who Gets Slapped, and director Tod Browning later cast John Gilbert in his 1927 film The Show. Gilbert later became engaged to Greta Garbo, and drifted off into a string of big budget Hollywood romantic drama films, before dying in 1936 from heart failure.

== Critical comments ==
"It's hard to believe Maurice Tourneur directed this film. Lon Chaney is miscast." - Photoplay

"The settings are worthy of note, but settings do not make a picture any more than the proverbial swallow makes a summer. The French atmosphere plus the Chamber of Horrors background might appeal to a certain type of picture-goer.... The reproductions of the French Latin Quarter are correct to the smallest detail." - Harrison's Reports

"The story is somewhat gruesome and exaggerated, although similar ideas have been used before in successful dramas. There are no doubt a considerable number of patrons who are fascinated by a strain of morbidity. For this class, the picture will provide thrilling entertainment." - Moving Picture World

"This feature looks as though it was an old boy that had been lying around for some little time, finally patched up and released to salvage whatever could be got from it. It has all the appearances of a picture that might have been made three or four years ago...Lon Chaney plays the heavy and from the role it is quite evident it must have been shot long before the day he started starring. But Chaney is better in this picture than he has been in some of his more recent efforts." - Variety

"It is quite apparent that Tourneur made this picture before Chaney came to the fore as a "man of a thousand faces" - Film Daily
