= Twelve Miles Out =

1927 film

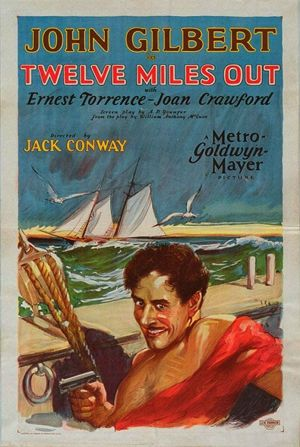
- Theatrical release poster
- Directed by: Jack Conway
- Written by: Scenario: A. P. Younger; Titles: Joseph Farnham
- Based on: Twelve Miles Out; 1925 play by William Anthony McGuire
- Produced by: Irving Thalberg
- Starring: John Gilbert; Joan Crawford; Ernest Torrence; Eileen Percy
- Cinematography: Ira H. Morgan
- Edited by: Basil Wrangell
- Distributed by: Metro-Goldwyn-Mayer
- Release date: July 9, 1927
- Running time: 85 minutes
- Country: United States
- Languages: Silent (English intertitles)

Twelve Miles Out is a 1927 American silent drama film directed by Jack Conway and starring John Gilbert and Joan Crawford. It is based on the 1925 Broadway play Twelve Miles Out by William Anthony McGuire. A print of this film exists.

== Plot ==
Jerry Fay is a bootlegger who expropriates the home of society girl, Jane, for his illicit activities. While as his captor, Jane slowly begins to fall for Jerry.

== Cast ==
- John Gilbert as Jerry Fay
- Ernest Torrence as Red McCue
- Joan Crawford as Jane
- Eileen Percy as Maizie
- Paulette Duval as Trini
- Dorothy Sebastian as Chiquita
- Gwen Lee as Hulda
- Edward Earle as John Burton
- Bert Roach as Luke
