= Downstairs (film) =

1932 film

- Paul Lukas, Virginia Bruce and John Gilbert
- Directed by: Monta Bell
- Screenplay by: Lenore J. Coffee; Melville Baker
- Story by: John Gilbert
- Produced by: Monta Bell
- Starring: John Gilbert; Paul Lukas; Virginia Bruce
- Cinematography: Harold Rosson
- Edited by: Conrad A. Nervig
- Distributed by: Metro-Goldwyn-Mayer
- Release date: August 6, 1932
- Running time: 77 minutes
- Country: United States
- Language: English

Downstairs is a 1932 American pre-Code drama film. It stars John Gilbert as a charming but self-serving chauffeur who wreaks havoc on his new employer's household, romancing and fleecing the women on the staff, and blackmailing the employer's wife. Gilbert had written the story in 1928 for a proposed silent film that was never produced.

Producer Irving Thalberg revived the project in 1932 as a special Gilbert production. The actor was so jubilant about the opportunity that he sold his original story to Metro-Goldwyn-Mayer for only one dollar.

== Plot ==
The film opens with Baron Von Burgen's head butler Albert marrying the young housemaid, Anna, on the Baron's Austrian estate. During the ceremony, newly hired chauffeur Karl Schneider arrives and soon finds an old acquaintance—a former lover—Countess De Marnac, who appears displeased with Karl mixing with her elite friends. That night, when François, one of the butlers, gets too drunk to work, Albert is summoned to take over his shift. Anna, now unaccompanied, is visited by Karl, who wins over her sympathy by telling her about his unfortunate childhood.

One day, Karl drives Baroness Eloise to Vienna for shopping purposes. She has him drop her off at her town apartment which she keeps for her visits from her boyfriend. When they return home, Eloise claims that they were in an accident, but Albert does not believe her. He asks Karl about it, and brushes off Karl's attempt to tell the truth but instead reminding him to remain loyal to their employers. He reminds him of his social position and warns him never to interfere with the upper-class people.

Even though Karl agrees with Albert's advice, he jumps his chances to seduce Anna, who he soon concludes is very naive and easy to manipulate. He tries to kiss her, but she slaps him and warns him never to try again. As Albert returns to the room, Karl decides to leave to avoid a remorseful situation, and he goes to his room, where the cook Sophie is waiting for him. After a brief flirtation, she spends the night.

The next day, Karl insults Sophie and lies about being the illegitimate son of royalty in order to extort money from her. He next uses a jewel he has found from Eloise the day before in the car to gain respect from Anna, though she is disgusted by what he has done to Sophie and rejects it. He pins the jewel on her crucifix necklace anyway, and Eloise soon recognizes it as her own. When she accuses Anna of stealing, Karl comes to the rescue, claiming the jewel to be his own, winning back Anna's sympathy.

Eloise recognizes this as blackmail because Karl knows she has a lover she meets at the apartment. Eloise later discusses the matter with the Baron, and Albert overhears her saying that Karl and Anna are involved in an affair. Eloise, who is excited about the scandal, arranges for them to have some privacy together on a fishing trip, but at the last minute, the Baron demands that Albert come along. Albert then confronts Karl, warning him to stay away from Anna.

Karl and Anna stay behind, and he again jumps his chances by taking her to a pub. They grow close until she finds out that he has arranged a room for the two to stay in. Disgusted at his intentions, she leaves. Karl follows her to her room and claims that he only lied to and deceived her because he is very much in love with her. Vulnerable to his words, Anna becomes worried when he announces that he will leave the mansion. Karl notices this and kisses her passionately as a goodbye. They end up spending the night together.

As soon as Albert returns from the trip, he fires Karl for a plausible reason and then unleashes his frustration on Anna by criticizing her appearance. Anna, in tears, blames him for having driven her to seek affection with another man. Karl, meanwhile, blackmails the baroness into reinstalling him as a chauffeur. Albert feels humiliated and tells Eloise that he will resign. Eloise tries to stop him and, in tears, admits to being blackmailed. Albert advises her to go to the police, but she tells him she can't, because her affair with him cannot go public. Albert, who sympathizes with her, agrees to stay and plans to destroy Karl. That night, Sophie, unhappy, offers Karl all her savings in order to realize her dream of running away with him and opening their own shop.

The next morning, Karl, with Sophie's savings, packs his bags to leave for Paris and begs Anna to join him. Anna refuses, telling him that she is still in love with Albert. Anna tries to escape from him with Sophie's money but they end up knocking over a large rack of wine bottles, attracting attention from the Baron. The Baron thinks they are fighting over the wine and orders them to apologize to each other. As soon as the Baron leaves, Albert pretends to reconcile with Karl, offers some wine, then tells Karl to get out of their lives. They get into another fight when Karl refuses. Anna, afraid that one might kill the other, calls the Baron and Albert makes Karl confess about his many deceptions. The Baron orders Karl to leave, and congratulates Albert for his courage and loyalty. Karl leaves the scene, ready to scheme his way into another upper-class woman's life.

== Cast ==
- John Gilbert as Karl Schneider, the chauffeur
- Paul Lukas as Albert, the Baron's butler
- Virginia Bruce as Anna, Albert's wife
- Hedda Hopper as Countess De Marnac
- Reginald Owen as Baron "Nicky" Von Burgen
- Olga Baclanova as Baroness Eloise Von Burgen
- Bodil Rosing as Sophie, the Cook
- Otto Hoffman as Otto, the Wine Cellar Caretaker
- Lucien Littlefield as Francois, a Drunken Servant
