= George Siegmann =

American actor (1882-1928)

George A. Siegmann
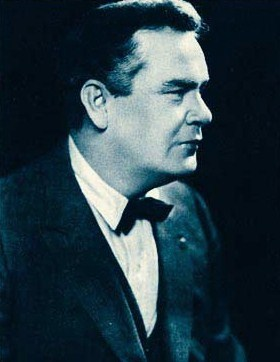
- Siegmann in 1924
- Born: George A. Siegmann; February 8, 1882; New York City, New York, U.S.
- Died: June 22, 1928 (aged 46); Hollywood, Los Angeles, California, U.S.
- Resting place: Calvary Cemetery
- Other names: George Seigmann
- Occupations: Actor, film director
- Years active: 1909–1928
- Spouse(s): Marguerite H. Webb (m. 1917, divorced) Maude Darby (m. 1927)

George A. Siegmann (also credited as George Seigmann; February 8, 1882 – June 22, 1928) was an American actor and film director in the silent film era. His work includes roles in notable productions such as The Birth of a Nation (1915), Intolerance (1916), The Three Musketeers (1921), Oliver Twist (1922), The Cat and the Canary (1927), and The Man Who Laughs (1928).

== Early life and career ==
Born in New York City in 1882, Siegmann is listed as having been in over 100 films. His more notable roles include Silas Lynch in D.W. Griffith's The Birth of a Nation (1915), Cyrus the Great in Intolerance (1916), Porthos in The Three Musketeers (1921), Bill Sikes in Oliver Twist (1922), the guard in the 1927 film The Cat and the Canary, and Dr. Hardquanonne in The Man Who Laughs, which was completed in 1927 but released in 1928. In 1919, Siegmann served as a director for Universal Pictures' production of the five-reel horror film The Trembling Hour starring Kenneth Harlan and Helen Eddy.

== Personal life and death ==
Siegmann's career almost ended early, in 1915, when he was seriously injured while riding as a passenger in a car driven by fellow film actor and director Tod Browning. Browning collided at full speed with a "street work car loaded with iron rails", reportedly due to his not seeing that work vehicle's "rear lamp". Another actor, Elmer Booth, was a passenger as well in Browning's car. Booth died instantly, and Siegmann suffered four broken ribs, a deeply lacerated thigh, and internal injuries. Browning was badly injured too, including a shattered right leg and the loss of his front teeth.

Siegmann married at least twice. In 1917 he married 22-year-old Marguerite Webb, a native of Michigan. The length of their union is undetermined, although it presumably ended by divorce prior to his marriage to Maud Darby in 1927. That second marriage proved to be a relatively brief one, for the following year George, at age 46, died of pernicious anemia.

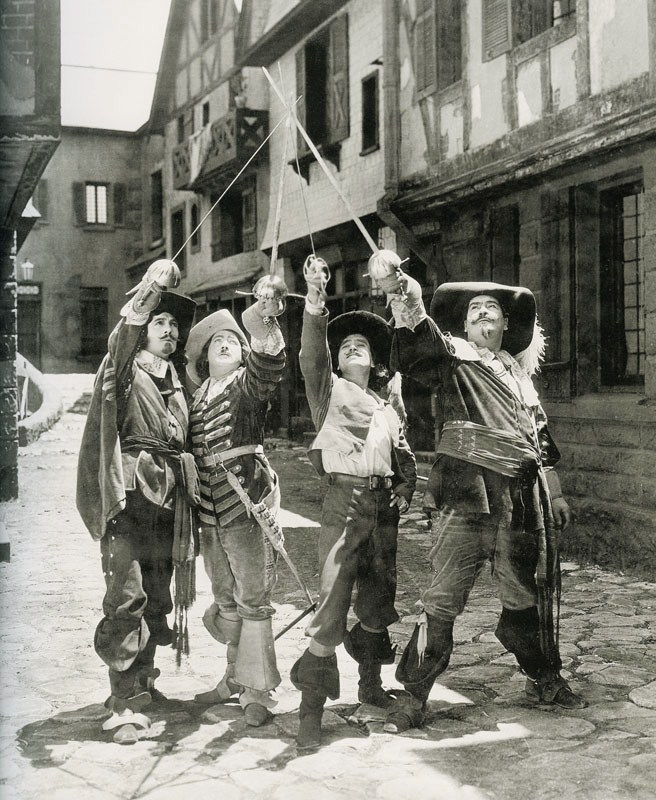
Léon Bary, Eugene Pallette, Douglas Fairbanks, and George Siegmann in The Three Musketeers (1921)

== Filmography ==
- The Hessian Renegades (1909, Short) - Hessian (film debut)
- A Flash of Light (1910, Short) - Wedding Guest
- The Green-Eyed Devil (1914, Short)
- Brute Force (1914, Short)
- Home, Sweet Home (1914)
- The Lover's Gift (1914, Short) - Sheriff Reed
- The Angel of Contention (1914, Short) - Sheriff Magoon
- The Avenging Conscience (1914) - The Italian
- The Birth of a Nation (1915) - Silas Lynch - Mulatto Lieut. Governor
- A Yankee from the West (1915) - Sheriff Dick
- Intolerance (1916) - Cyrus (uncredited)
- Should She Obey? (1917) - Allegorical Types
- Grafters (1917) - The Menace
- The Little Yank (1917)
- Mother Love and the Law (1917) - William Bernard
- Hearts of the World (1918) - Von Strohm
- The Great Love (1918) - Mr. Seymour
- The Hawk's Trail (1919) - Quang Goo Hai
- The Spitfire of Seville (1919)
- The Trembling Hour (1919)
- The Untamed (1920) - Jim Silent
- Little Miss Rebellion (1920) - Col. Moro
- The Big Punch (1921) - Flash McGraw
- Partners of Fate (1921) - Purser
- A Connecticut Yankee in King Arthur's Court (1921) - Sir Sagramore
- The Queen of Sheba (1921) - King Armud of Sheba
- Desperate Trails (1921) - Sheriff Price
- Shame (1921) - Foo Chang
- The Three Musketeers (1921) - Porthos
- Silent Years (1921) - Pierre Gavot
- The Truthful Liar (1922) - Mark Potts
- Fools First (1922) - Spud Miller
- Monte Cristo (1922) - Luigi Vampa
- Oliver Twist (1922) - Bill Sikes
- Hungry Hearts (1922) - Rosenblatt
- A California Romance (1922) - Don Juan Diego
- Lost and Found on a South Sea Island (1923) - Faulke
- Slander the Woman (1923) - Scarborough
- Stepping Fast (1923) - 'Red' Pollock
- Merry-Go-Round (1923) - Schani Huber
- Scaramouche (1923) - Danton
- Hell's Hole (1923) - Conductor
- The Eagle's Feather (1923) - Van Brewen
- Jealous Husbands (1923) - 'Red' Lynch
- Anna Christie (1923) - Anna's Uncle
- Enemies of Children (1923)
- The Man Life Passed By (1923) - Crogan
- On Time (1924) - Wang Wu
- Singer Jim McKee (1924) - 'Brute' Bernstein
- Stolen Secrets (1924) - Nat Fox
- The Shooting of Dan McGrew (1924) - Jake Hubbel
- When a Girl Loves (1924) - Rogojin
- The Right of the Strongest (1924) - 'Trav' Williams
- The Guilty One (1924) - Captain
- Revelation (1924) - Hofer
- Janice Meredith (1924) - Colonel Rahl
- Manhattan (1924) - Bud McGinnis
- A Sainted Devil (1924) - El Tigre
- Recompense (1925) - Stenhouse
- Zander the Great (1925) - Black Bart
- Never the Twain Shall Meet (1925) - James Muggridge
- Pursued (1925) - John Grant
- Manhattan Madness (1925) - Dr. Harlan
- The Caretaker's Daughter (1925, Short) - The Gunman - Prospective Car Buyer
- The Red Kimono (1925) - Mr. Mack
- The Sporting Life (1925) - Limehouse Dan Crippen
- The Phantom Express (1925) - Rufus Hardy
- The Palace of Pleasure (1926) - Caesar
- The Midnight Sun (1926) - Ivan Kusmin - Banker
- My Old Dutch (1926) - Workhouse Superintendent
- Born to the West (1926) - Jesse Fillmore
- The Carnival Girl (1926) - Sigmund
- Poker Faces (1926) - George Dixon
- The Old Soak (1926) - Al
- Hotel Imperial (1927) - Gen. Juschkiewitsch
- The Red Mill (1927) - Willen
- The King of Kings (1927) - Barabbas
- The Cat and the Canary (1927) - The Guard
- Love Me and the World Is Mine (1927) - Porter
- Uncle Tom's Cabin (1927) - Simon Legree
- The Thirteenth Juror (1927) - The Politician, George Quinn
- Stop That Man! (1928) - 'Butch' Barker
- The Man Who Laughs (1928) - Dr. Hardquanonne (final film)
