= Little Miss Rebellion =

1920 film by George Fawcett

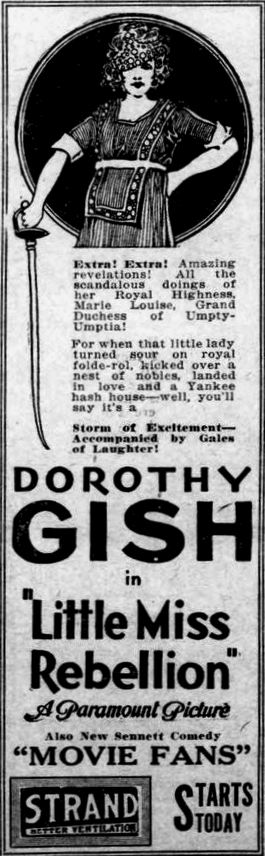
- Newspaper ad
- Directed by: George Fawcett
- Screenplay by: Harry Carr; Wells Hastings
- Starring: Dorothy Gish; Ralph Graves; George Siegmann; Riley Hatch; Marie Burke
- Cinematography: Walter Hill
- Production companies: New Art Film Company; Famous Players–Lasky Corporation
- Distributed by: Paramount Pictures
- Release date: September 19, 1920
- Running time: 50 minutes
- Country: United States
- Language: Silent (English intertitles)

Little Miss Rebellion is a 1920 American silent comedy drama film directed by George Fawcett and written by Harry Carr and Wells Hastings. The film stars Dorothy Gish, Ralph Graves, George Siegmann, Riley Hatch, and Marie Burke. The film was released on September 19, 1920, by Paramount Pictures. It is not known whether the film currently survives.

== Plot ==
As described in a film magazine, the young Grand Duchess Marie Louise of Molvenia, weary of life among the aristocracy, eagerly welcomes the relief that comes with the acquaintance of American soldiers that camp near her castle. She singles out Sergeant Richard Ellis for her attentions, and he is supremely happy in his love for her until her identity is revealed. Before he can readjust their friendship, his troops leave for home and he bids her goodbye. Then comes the Bolshevik revolution that dethrones her and makes her flee with trusted servant Stephen to America. Turning flapjacks in a restaurant window, she finds Richard again. However, Bolsheviks track her down, desiring the crown jewels she brought with her, but are bested by Richard and Stephen. With this victory comes word from abroad that her throne once again awaits her.

== Cast ==
- Dorothy Gish as Grand Duchess Marie Louise
- Ralph Graves as Sgt. Richard Ellis
- George Siegmann as Col. Moro
- Riley Hatch as Stephen
- Marie Burke as Lady-in-Waiting
