= The Eagle's Feather =

1923 film

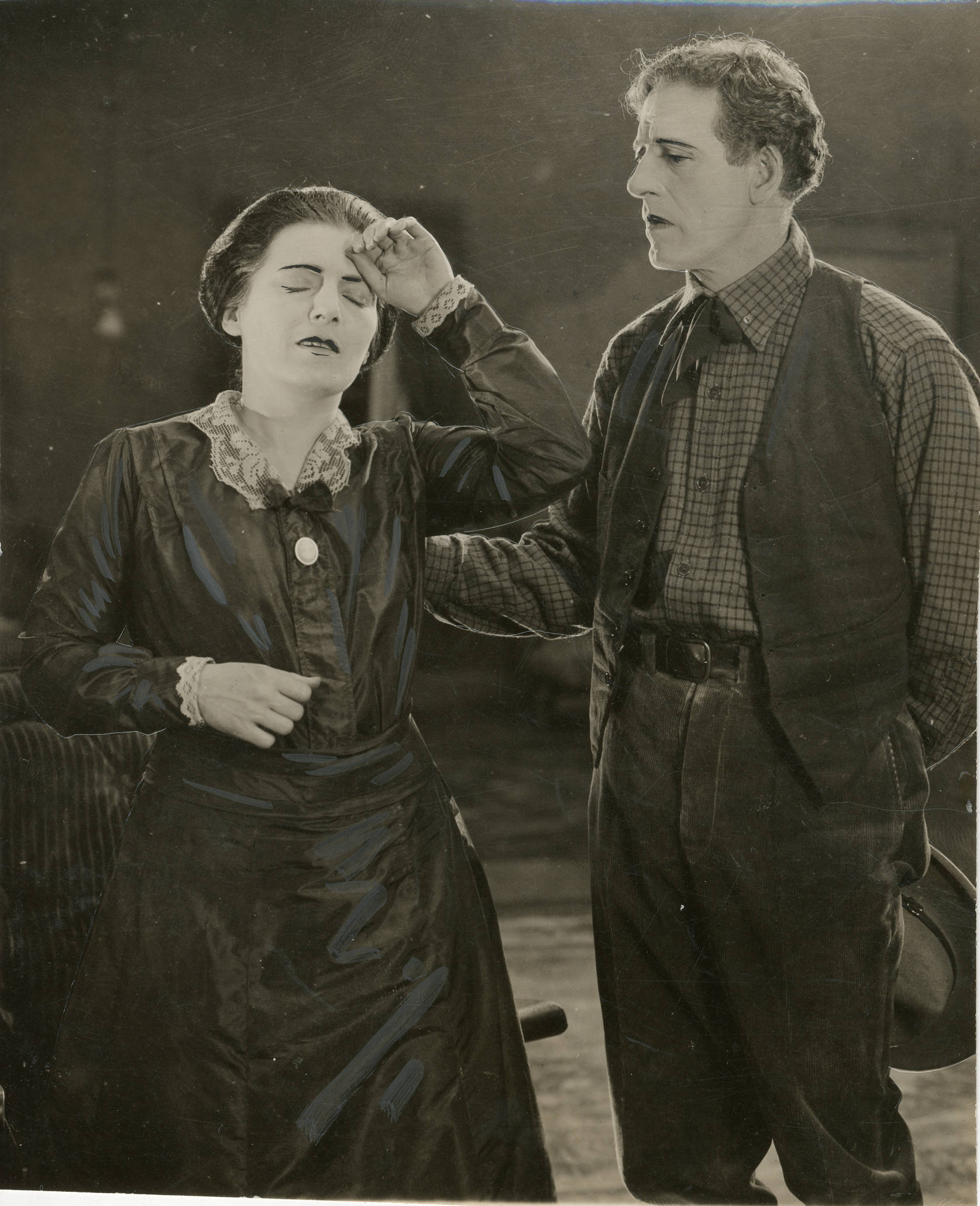
- Film still
- Directed by: Edward Sloman
- Written by: Winifred Dunn
- Story by: Katharine Newlin Burt
- Starring: James Kirkwood; Mary Alden
- Cinematography: Allen M. Davey; A.G. Heimerl; Reginald Lyons
- Production company: Metro Pictures
- Distributed by: Metro Pictures
- Release date: October 15, 1923
- Running time: 7 reels
- Country: United States
- Languages: Silent; English intertitles

The Eagle's Feather is a 1923 American silent Western film directed by Edward Sloman and starring James Kirkwood and Mary Alden. It was produced and distributed by Metro Pictures.

== Cast ==
- Mary Alden as Delia Jamiesoon
- James Kirkwood as John Trent
- Lester Cuneo as Jeff Carey
- Elinor Fair as Martha
- George Siegmann as Van Brewen
- Crauford Kent as Count De Longe
- John Elliott as Parson Winger
- Charles McHugh as The Irishman
- William Orlamond as The Swede
- James Wang as Wing Ling
- Rosemary Theby as Mrs. Trent

== Preservation status ==
A copy of The Eagle's Feather is held in the Gosfilmofond archive.
