= The Red Viper =

1919 American silent drama film

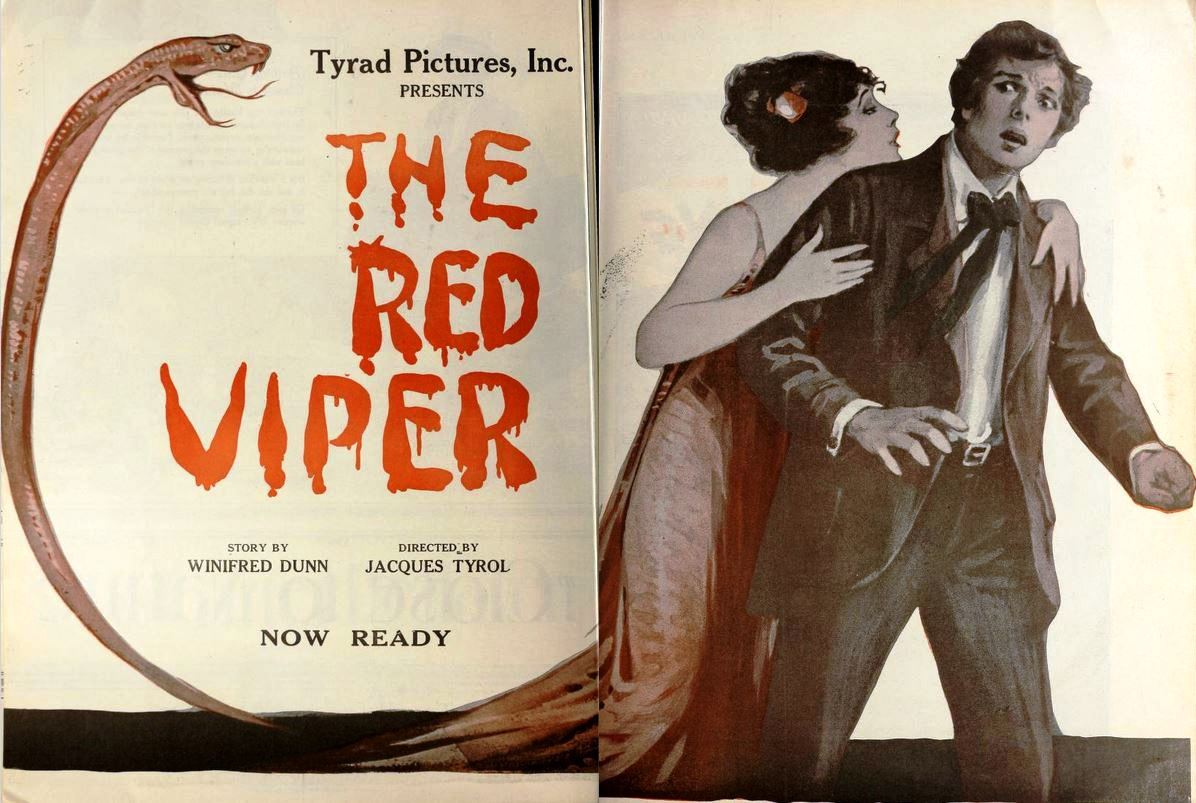
- An advertisement for The Red Viper from Motion Picture News
- Directed by: Jacques Tyrol
- Written by: Winifred Dunn
- Produced by: Jacques Tyrol
- Cinematography: Edward Wynard
- Distributed by: Tyrad Pictures, Inc. and State Rights
- Release date: September 7, 1919
- Country: United States

The Red Viper is a 1919 American silent film drama. It is anti-Communist themed and was produced during the red scare.

== Plot ==
David Belkov, a newsboy born to immigrant parents living on New York's East Side, admires the late Theodore Roosevelt. However, after witnessing a poor family being evicted, he becomes involved with the Hogan Street anarchist group, whose members include his father's friends and his sweetheart, Yolanda Kosloff. The group plans to assassinate Judge Norton, who had previously sentenced one of their comrades to death in the electric chair. Inspired by the courage of twelve-year-old Mary Hogan, who sings patriotic songs to drown out the anarchists' speeches, David prints leaflets opposing their ideas. When Mary is killed while trying to stop the plot, David is captured and severely beaten. Government agents posing as converts eventually break up the group. David then rushes to Norton's home, where Yolanda is attending a celebration, and prevents her from dropping a bomb. The anarchist leader shoots David, but Yolanda realizes her mistake and nurses him back to health.

== Production ==
The film's director and producer was Jacques Tyrol, the writer was Winifred Dunn, and the cinematographer was Edward Wynard.

The film was produced by Tyrad Pictures, Inc. The film was distributed by Tyrad Pictures, Inc. and State Rights.

The film was released on September 7, 1919.

The film was an anti-communist film, made during the First Red Scare.

== Cast ==
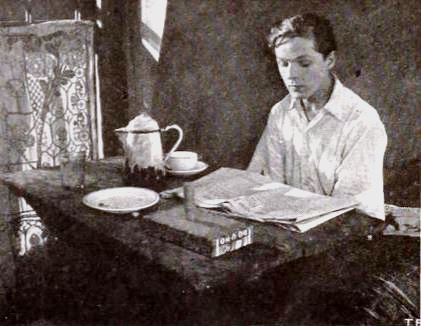
A still from The Red Viper featuring Gareth Hughes

- Gareth Hughes as David Belkov
- Ruth Stonehouse as Mary Hogan
- Jack Gilbert as Dick Grant
- Irma Harrison as Yolanda Kosloff
- R. H. Fitzsimmons as Charles Smith
- Alberta Lee as Mrs. Hogan
- Alfred Hollingsworth as Pat Hogan

== Preservation ==
In February of 2021, The Red Viper was cited by the National Film Preservation Board on their Lost U.S. Silent Feature Films list and is therefore presumed lost.
