= He Who Gets Slapped (film) =

1924 film

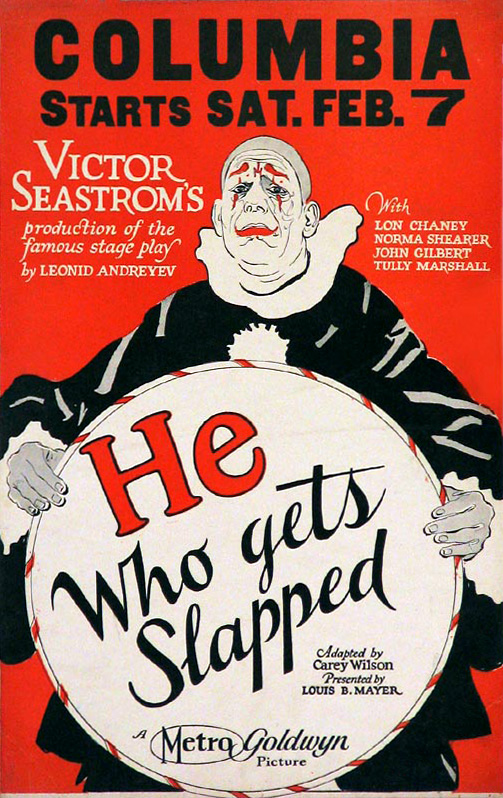
- Theatrical release poster
- Directed by: Victor Seastrom
- Screenplay by: Victor Seastrom; Carey Wilson
- Based on: He Who Gets Slapped; 1914 play by Leonid Andreyev
- Produced by: Victor Seastrom; Irving Thalberg (uncredited)
- Starring: Lon Chaney; Norma Shearer; John Gilbert
- Cinematography: Milton Moore
- Edited by: Hugh Wynn
- Music by: William Axt
- Production company: Metro-Goldwyn-Mayer
- Distributed by: Metro-Goldwyn Distributing Corporation
- Release date: November 9, 1924 (United States); (premiere)
- Running time: 72 minutes (7 reels)
- Country: United States
- Languages: Silent film; English intertitles
- Budget: $172,000
- Box office: $881,000

He Who Gets Slapped is a 1924 American silent psychological thriller tragedy film starring Lon Chaney, Norma Shearer, and John Gilbert, and directed by Victor Sjöström (credited as Victor Seastrom). The film was written by Sjöström and Carey Wilson, based on the Russian play He Who Gets Slapped (Тот, кто получает пощёчины; Tot, kto polučájet poščóčiny) by playwright Leonid Andreyev, which was completed by Andreyev in August 1915, two months before its world premiere at the Moscow Art Theatre on October 27, 1915. A critically successful Broadway production, using an English language translation of the original Russian by Gregory Zilboorg, was staged in 1922, premiering at the Garrick Theatre on January 9, 1922, with Richard Bennett playing the "HE" role on stage. The Russian original was made into a Russian movie in 1916.

He Who Gets Slapped was the first film produced entirely by the newly formed Metro-Goldwyn-Mayer. It was not, however, MGM's first released movie, as the film was held until the Christmas season when higher attendance was expected. The movie was highly profitable and critically hailed. It was also the first film to feature a lion as the mascot for MGM. Created by Howard Dietz, the lion logo was first used for the Goldwyn Pictures Corporation film Polly of the Circus and passed on to MGM when Goldwyn merged with two other companies to form MGM. Coincidentally, a real lion plays a key plot point in the Chaney film's plotline.

The film was important in the careers of Chaney, Shearer, Gilbert, and Sjöström. Inspired by Chaney's performance, Sjöström called him "the finest actor in the history of the screen or the stage". George Davis, a popular European clown, coached Chaney in his clown role. The circus sequences took two weeks to film on the studio's largest stage. Stills exist showing details of Chaney's makeup as both Paul Beaumont and "HE".

In 2017, the film was selected for preservation in the United States National Film Registry by the Library of Congress as being "culturally, historically, or aesthetically significant". The film entered the public domain on January 1, 2020 (along with all American films from 1924) as dictated by U.S. copyright law.

== Plot ==
He Who Gets Slapped (1924)

Paul Beaumont is a scientist who labored for years alone to prove his radical theories on the origin of mankind. Baron Regnard becomes his patron, enabling him to do research while living in his mansion. One day, Beaumont announces to his beloved wife Marie and the Baron that he has proved all his theories and is ready to present them before the Academy of the Sciences. He leaves the arrangements to the Baron. However, after Beaumont goes to sleep, Marie steals his key, opens the safe containing his papers, and gives them to the Baron.

On the appointed day, Beaumont travels to the Academy with the Baron. He is aghast when the Baron, instead of introducing him, takes credit for Beaumont's work himself. After he recovers from the shock, Beaumont confronts him in front of everyone, but the Baron tells them that Beaumont is merely his assistant and slaps him. All of the academicians laugh at his humiliation. Beaumont later seeks comfort from his wife, but Marie brazenly admits that she and the Baron are having an affair and calls him a clown. Beaumont leaves them.

Five years pass by. Beaumont is now a clown calling himself "HE who gets slapped", the star attraction of a small circus near Paris. His act consists of his getting slapped every evening by other clowns, and includes HE pretending to present in front of the Academy of the Sciences.

Another of the performers is Bezano, a daredevil horseback rider. Consuelo, the daughter of the impoverished Count Mancini, applies to join his act. Bezano falls in love with Consuelo, as does HE. Consuelo's father, however, is planning to restore the family's fortunes by marrying her to the wealthy Baron Regnard.

One night, during HE's performance, he spots the Baron in the audience and becomes enraged. The Baron then goes backstage and begins flirting with Consuelo, which she does not like. The next day, the Baron sends Consuelo jewelry, but she rejects it.

When her father leaves for a meeting with the Baron, Bezano takes Consuelo out to the countryside for a romantic meeting, where they declare their love for each other. Meanwhile, Count Mancini convinces the reluctant Baron that the only way he can have Consuelo is by marrying her. The Baron agrees, and discards the heartbroken Marie, leaving her with a check.

Later, HE admits to Consuelo he, too, is in love with her. She thinks he is kidding and laughingly slaps him. They are interrupted by the Baron and the Count, who inform Consuelo she will marry the Baron after the evening performance. When HE tries to interfere, he is locked in an adjoining room, where an angry lion is kept in a cage. He moves the cage so that, when he carefully opens it, only the door to the next room prevents the lion from escaping. HE re-enters the other room through the only other entrance (making sure to lock it behind him) and reveals his identity to the Baron. HE threatens the Baron, but the Count stabs him with a sword.

The Baron and the Count try to leave but, finding the main entrance locked, open the side door, releasing the lion. The animal kills the Count, then the Baron. However, the lion tamer shows up and saves HE from the same fate. HE goes on stage and collapses. Assuring Consuelo that he is happy and that she will be free to lead her own life, HE dies in her arms.

== Cast ==
- Lon Chaney as Paul Beaumont, aka HE
- Norma Shearer as Consuelo
- John Gilbert as Bezano
- Tully Marshall as Count Mancini
- Marc McDermott as Baron Regnard
- Ford Sterling as Tricaud
- Harvey Clark as Briquet
- Paulette Duval as Zinida
- Ruth King as Marie Beaumont
- Clyde Cook as A Clown
- Brandon Hurst as A Clown (uncredited)
- George Davis as A Clown
- Edward Arnold as Extra (uncredited)
- Bartine Burkett as Bareback Rider (uncredited)
- Carrie Daumery as Extra (uncredited)
- Erik Stocklassa as Ringmaster (uncredited)
- Joseph Hazelton as a Professor in the Audience
- George Marion as a Laughing Professor
- Scotty Mattraw as Violinist
- Harvey Clark as Briquet
- Pierre Watkin as Spectator at Circus

== Alternate soundtrack ==
The film was given a newly composed score by Will Gregory from the band Goldfrapp for use at live concert screenings of the film, initially in the Colston Hall in Bristol, UK on December 1, 2007. The score was later broadcast on BBC Radio 3 in February 2008 with linking narration by actor Samuel West to relay to listeners the plot of the film. The Alloy Orchestra has also composed a score for the film.

== Alleged Lugosi appearance ==
For years, it was thought that Bela Lugosi had played an uncredited bit part in this film, but this was never confirmed. The rumor originated from the discovery of a still from the film found in Lugosi's scrapbook posthumously, showing an unidentified clown speaking to Lon Chaney in one scene. People close to Lugosi thought it was evidence that Lugosi had appeared in the film, but film historians all agree that it is very unlikely as Lugosi was either in Chicago or New York City at the time this film was made in Hollywood.

== Release ==
The film took in $881,000, and made a profit of $349,000. He Who Gets Slapped was released on DVD by Warner Home Video on November 30, 1999. Warner has re-released the film several times as a part of its 6-disc Warner Archive Collection, first on November 22, 2011 and later on June 23, 2015.

== Critical reception ==
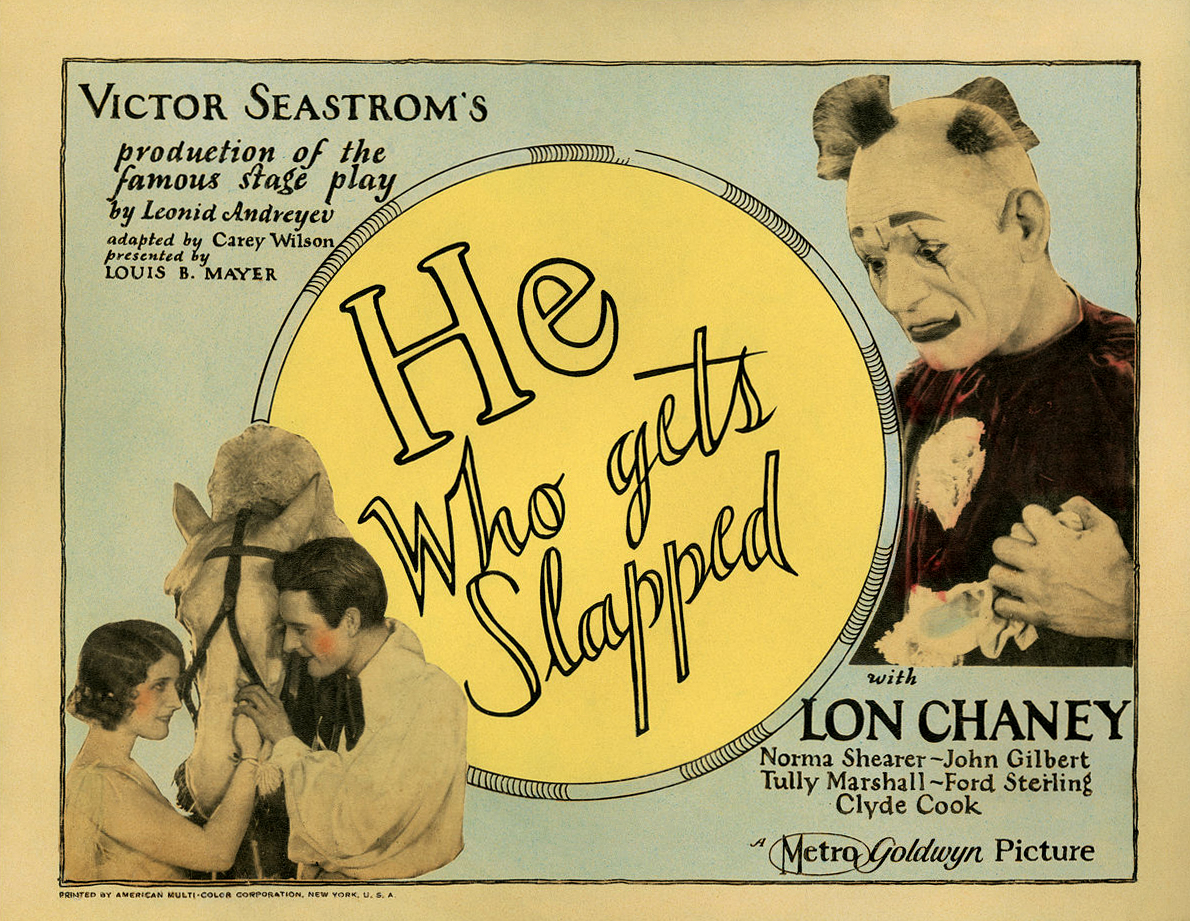
Lobby card from the film

He Who Gets Slapped received mostly positive reviews from critics upon its release, with many praising the film and Chaney's performance. In his 1924 review of the film for New York Times, Mordaunt Hall praised the film's direction, performances, and story, calling it' "the finest production we have yet seen". In 2010, author and film critic Leonard Maltin gave the film three out of a possible four stars, calling it "a Pagliacci–type vehicle for Chaney". In 2012, Allmovie's Hans J. Wollstein praised Chaney's and McDermott's performances, though he said that Sjöström "got entirely carried away" when the director called Chaney "the finest actor in the history of films and the stage".

"At the Capitol this week there is a picture which defies one to write about it without indulging in superlatives. It is a shadow drama so beautifully told, so flawlessly directed that we imagine that it will be held up as a model by all producers. Throughout its length there is not an instant of ennui, not a second one wants to lose...Never in his efforts before the camera has Mr. Chaney delivered such a marvelous performance as he does as this character. He is restrained in his acting, never overdoing the sentimental situations, and is guarded in his make-up...For dramatic value and a faultless adaptation of the play, this is the finest production we have yet seen." ---The New York Times

While reviews did not universally designate the film as "the perfect motion picture," contemporary critics regarded it as high-quality entertainment. Reviewers praised its acting, direction, and cinematography, singling out Lon Chaney's performance as "He" for its psychological depth and as a high point in his career, according to Variety.

"Lon Chaney does the best work of his career. Here his performance has breadth, force and imagination." ---Photoplay

"(Chaney's) makeup is, as usual, perfect and he gives you a magnificent performance, full of pathos that brings a gulp to your throat" ---Movie Weekly

"Never before have I seen Mr. Lon Chaney perform so faithfully and so knowingly as he does in this part of the tragic clown. Both as the scientist and later as the circus clown, he is shown to be abundantly equipped with those essential gifts which make for compelling characterization before the camera....(With all the film's) fineness, I am inclined to think that Mr. Lon Chaney is the real triumph" ---New York World

== Legacy ==
In 2024, a 4K restoration of the film was carried out by Blackhawk Films. A Blu-ray version released in 2025.

== See also ==
- List of American films of 1924
