= Adnan Taletovich =

Bosnian model, photographer and fashion designer

- Adnan Taletović
- Born: Adnan Taletović; 15 December 1966 (age 59); Brčko, SR Bosnia and Herzegovina, SFR Yugoslavia
- Occupations: Model; actor; designer; photographer
- Years active: 1990–present

Adnan Taletovich (Croatian: Taletović; born 15 December 1966) is a Bosnian male model, photographer and fashion designer of his own clothing label, Adventuryx.

He was born in the Bosnian town of Brčko into a Bosniak family, to parents Vezir and Ešefa. He grew up, was educated and started modeling in the Croatian city of Rijeka.

Taletovich came into prominence during the early 1990s and was photographed by fashion photographers such as Mario Testino, Karl Lagerfeld, Albert Watson and Arthur Elgort. He appeared in several magazines, automobile commercials, advertising campaigns for luxury fashion houses and fragrance brands like Paco Rabanne and Lacoste.

Notably, fashion designer and photographer Karl Lagerfeld used Taletovich as a model for some of his work in the 1990s, particularly from 1992 to 1997. In 2015, Lagerfeld cast Taletovich in Chanel's film Reincarnation, portraying the night porter in a fantasy scene.
