= Mrs. Leffingwell's Boots =

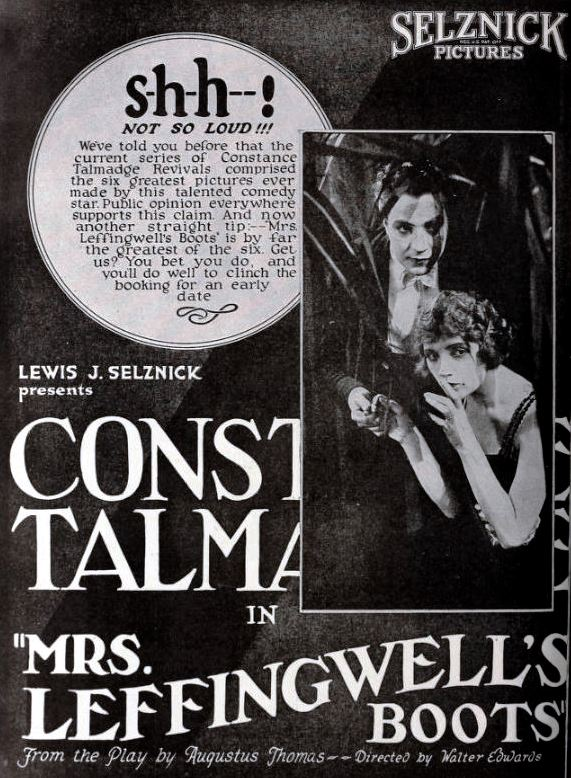
- Directed by: Walter Edwards
- Written by: Edith M. Kennedy; Augustus Thomas (play)
- Produced by: Lewis J. Selznick
- Starring: Constance Talmadge; Harrison Ford; George Fisher
- Cinematography: James Van Trees
- Production company: Select Pictures
- Distributed by: Select Pictures
- Release date: October 13, 1918
- Running time: 50 minutes
- Country: United States
- Languages: Silent; English intertitles

Mrs. Leffingwell's Boots is a 1918 American silent comedy film directed by Walter Edwards and starring Constance Talmadge, Harrison Ford and George Fisher.

The film was the fourth collaboration between stars Ford and Talmadge with director Edwards. Their previous films were A Pair of Silk Stockings (1918), Sauce for the Goose (1918), and A Lady's Name (1918).

== Cast ==
- Constance Talmadge as Mrs. Leffingwell
- Harrison Ford as Mr. Leffingwell
- George Fisher as Walter Huntley
- Vera Doria as Mrs. Tom Brown
- Fred Goodwins as Aleck Brown
- Mercedes Temple as Wilhelmina
- Herbert Prior as Mr. Tom Brown
- Julia Faye as Mabel Brown

== Preservation ==
Mrs. Leffingwell's Boots is currently presumed lost. In February of 2021, the film was cited by the National Film Preservation Board on their Lost U.S. Silent Feature Films list.

== Bibliography ==
- Goble, Alan. The Complete Index to Literary Sources in Film. Walter de Gruyter, 1999.
