= Good Night, Paul =

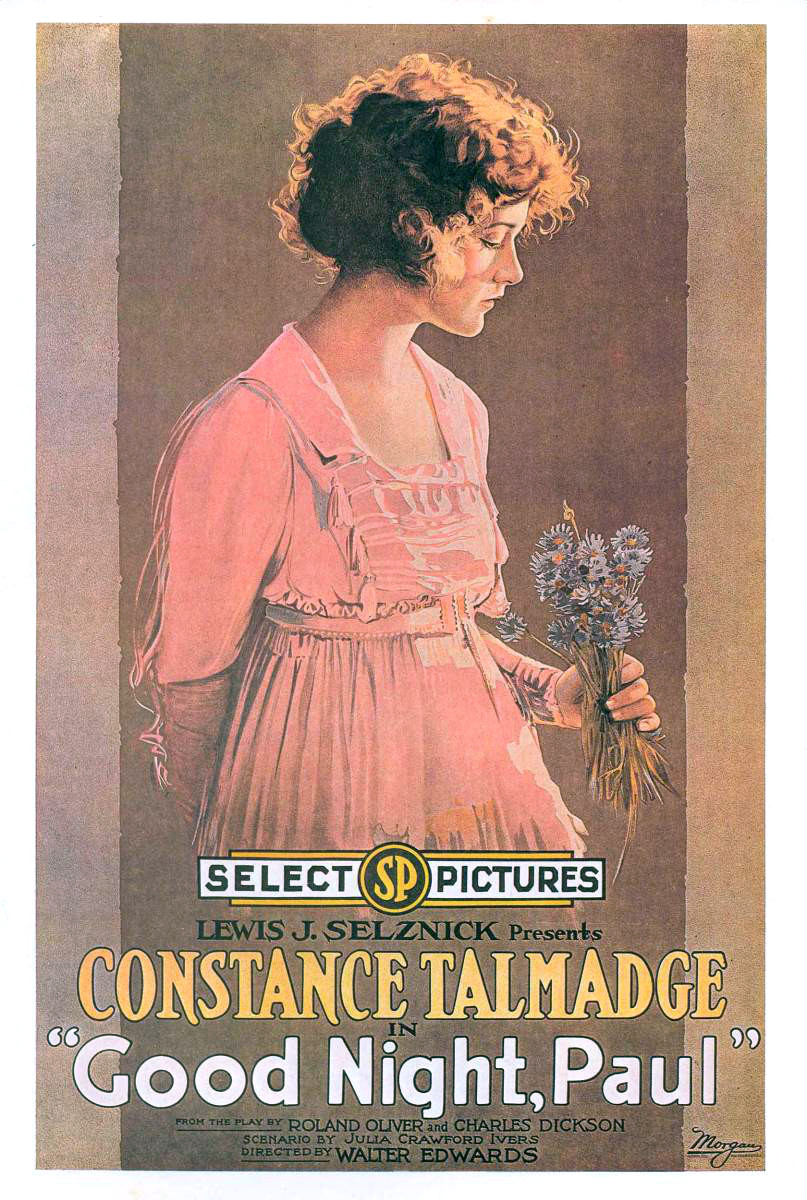
- Film poster
- Directed by: Walter Edwards
- Written by: Charles Dickson (story); Roland Oliver (story); Julia Crawford Ivers (adaptation)
- Produced by: Lewis J. Selznick
- Starring: Harrison Ford; Constance Talmadge; Norman Kerry
- Cinematography: James Van Trees
- Music by: Harry B. Olsen
- Distributed by: Select Pictures
- Release date: June 20, 1918
- Running time: Five reels
- Country: United States
- Language: Silent (English intertitles)

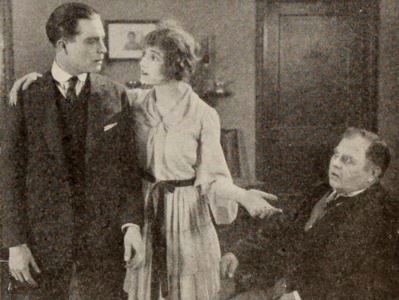
Harrison Ford, Constance Talmadge, and John Steppling

Good Night, Paul is a 1918 American silent comedy romance film directed by Walter Edwards. It was based on a successful stage play with book and lyrics by Roland Oliver and Charles Dickson and music by Harry B. Olsen. The film was produced by Lewis J. Selznick's Select Pictures Corporation.

The film a farce that entails a wife willing to pose as a wife of her husband's business partner as a scheme to hoodwink the business partner's uncle out of money. But the uncle's overextended visit forces schemers to keep up the charade leading to comical situations.

This film is extant in a European archive, Filmoteca Española, Madrid.

== Plot ==
As described in a film magazine, Richard (Kerry) and Paul (Ford), two business partners, are about to shipwreck on the financial rocks when Richard reminds Paul that his uncle could help them out as Paul is his heir. Uncle Batiste (Steppling) is at that time on the way to New York City as he is dangerously ill and desires to see Paul. Batiste is a bachelor and wants to see Paul a happy benedict. When he arrives he tells Paul that if he were married that he would be happy to provide all the money needed for the business. Richard's bride (Talmadge) has a bright idea and decides to make the uncle believe that she is Paul's wife instead of Richard's. She locks Richard in the bathroom while she goes into the parlor to hoodwink the uncle. Paul is speechless over the situation but his need for money persuades him to be a party to the deception, given that it will only be necessary to do this for a few hours. However, the uncle is so happy with the bride that he decides to stay for a month, and returns with his trained nurse, who turns out to be Paul's boyhood sweetheart, the girl he has never been able to forget. After several complications, only a confession can clear the trouble.

== Cast ==
- Constance Talmadge as Mrs. Richard Landers
- Harrison Ford as Paul Boudeaux
- Norman Kerry as Richard Landers
- Beatrice Van as Rose Hartley
- John Steppling as Batiste Boudeaux
- Rosita Marstini as Madame Julie
- Zasu Pitts

== Reception ==
Like many American films of the time, Good Night, Paul was subject to cuts by city and state film censorship boards. For example, the Chicago Board of Censors cut, in Reel 3, young woman in diaphanous nightgown and scene of same with group and the intertitle "What could Richard think? What could any loving husband think?"
