= Vera Doria =

Australian actress and opera singer

- Born: Veronica Fosbery Eyton; 20 March 1882; Tasmania, Australia
- Died: 22 June 1957 (aged 65); Los Angeles, California, USA
- Occupation(s): Actress, opera singer
- Spouse(s): Juan de la Cruz (m. 1908–??); John Snodgrass (m. 1921–??); Harold Wavell (m. 1924–1932)
- Relatives: Alice Eyton (sister); Charles Eyton (brother)

Vera Doria (born Veronica Eyton) was an Australian actress and opera singer active in Hollywood during the silent era.

== Biography ==
One of five children, Eyton was born in Tasmania, Australia, to New Zealanders journalist Robert Henry Eyton (–1885) and Eleanor Maud Eyton (née Fosbery).

She began singing opera in her native Australia as a young woman and toured Europe in the early 1910s. In December 1899, a Sydney's Masonic Lodge, she gave a pleasing rendition of the 'Convent' aria from Daughter of the Regiment. In a complimentary concert in March 1901 at Sydney's Centenary Hall, before departing for London, she gave two selections, 'O, Divine Redeemer' and from Rossini's Semiramide, 'Bel Raggio'. In March 1902 she was playing Princess Ivy of 'The invisible prince' at the Edinburgh Theatre Royal. By early 1903 she was involved in London pantomimes.

By December 1903 Eyton was noted, as Vera Nightingale, as party to a successful divorce petition on the grounds of adultery by Lillian Sophia Mackenzie-Fairfax against her husband John Mackenzie Fairfax. That couple had married in June 1898, but alleged the husband met Eyton in Sydney in January 1902 before all three persons returned to London.

Eventually followed her older siblings, Alice Eyton (a screenwriter) and Charles Eyton (a film producer) to Los Angeles in 1915 seeking a career as an actress. At the time, she was married to fellow opera singer Juan de la Cruz.

She appears to have retired from acting in the late 1910s to focus on her singing career. She eventually moved to Shanghai, where she met and married her second and third husbands, John Snodgrass and Harold Wavell. after she returned, she became a children's author.

She died on 22 June 1957.

== Selected filmography ==
- The Veiled Adventure (1919)
- Life's a Funny Proposition (1919)
- A Lady's Name (1918)
- Women's Weapons (1918)
- Mrs. Leffingwell's Boots (1918)
- Salome (1918)
- Sauce for the Goose (1918)
- A Pair of Silk Stockings (1918)
- The Madcap (1916)
- The Majesty of the Law (1915)
