= The Gypsy Trail =

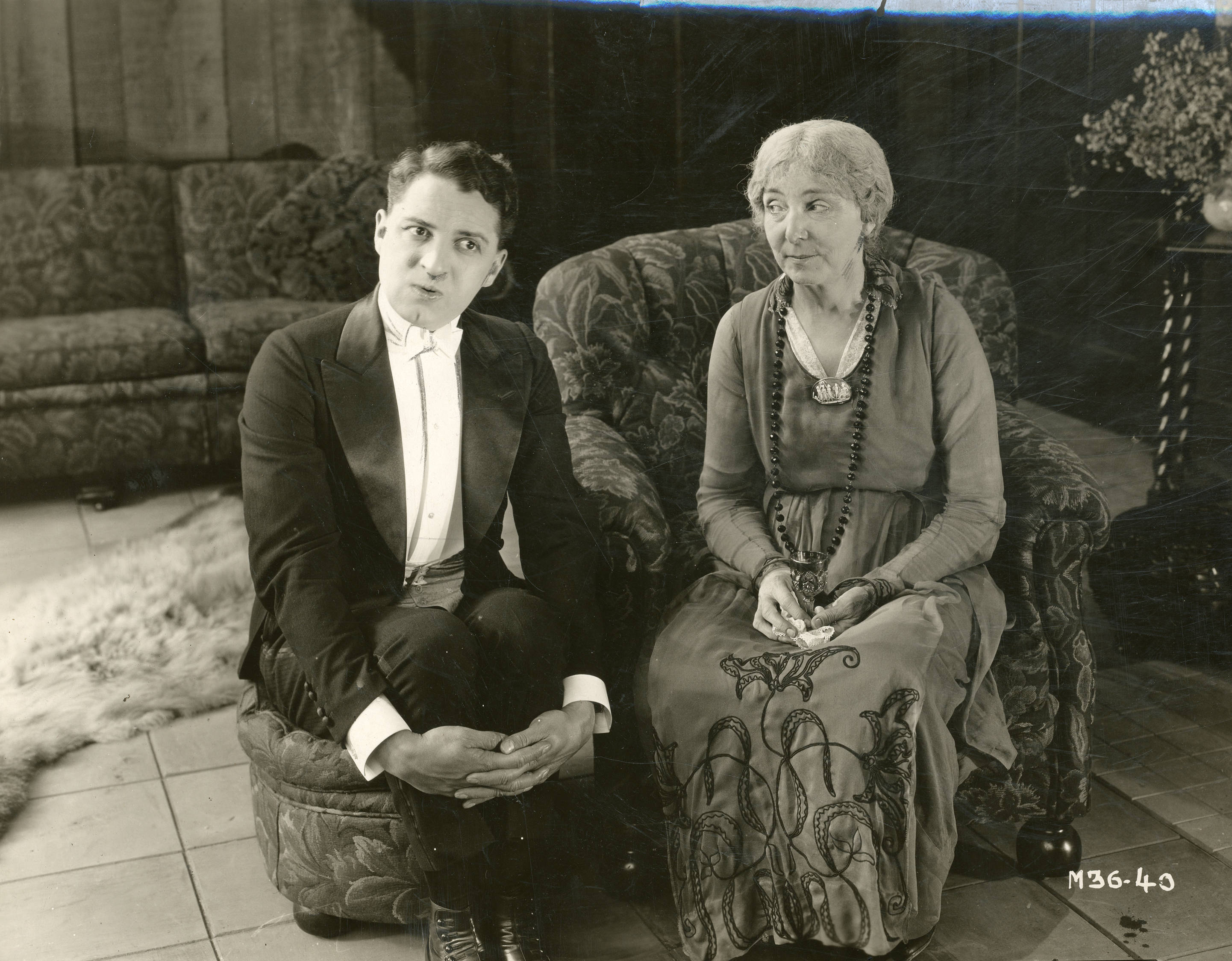
- Still with Bryant Washburn and Edyth Chapman
- Directed by: Walter Edwards
- Screenplay by: Robert Housum; Julia Crawford Ivers
- Produced by: Jesse L. Lasky
- Starring: Bryant Washburn; Wanda Hawley; Casson Ferguson; Clarence Geldart; Georgie Stone; Edythe Chapman
- Cinematography: James Van Trees
- Production company: Famous Players–Lasky Corporation
- Distributed by: Paramount Pictures
- Release date: November 17, 1918
- Running time: 50 minutes
- Country: United States
- Language: Silent (English intertitles)

The Gypsy Trail is a 1918 American silent comedy film directed by Walter Edwards and written by Robert Housum and Julia Crawford Ivers. The film stars Bryant Washburn, Wanda Hawley, Casson Ferguson, Clarence Geldart, Georgie Stone, and Edythe Chapman. The film was released on November 17, 1918, by Paramount Pictures.

== Plot ==
As described in a film magazine, Edward Andrews worships the romance-loving Frances Raymond, the daughter of wealthy parents, but she always turns down his proposals. Finally, she hints that she may be won over using caveman tactics. Edward hires a reporter, Michael Rudder, to kidnap Frances and take her to his country home, where he has installed his grandmother to act as a chaperon. Frances is won over by the ardent lovemaking of the reporter and when she suggests that they get married at once, the poor reporter runs away. Frances is now inconsolable, and Edward very obligingly goes in search of the wooer. When they return, the reporter reveals that he is wealthy and has a title and estate in England, but Frances decides in favor of the conventional Edward.

== Cast ==
- Bryant Washburn as Edward Andrews
- Wanda Hawley as Frances Raymond
- Casson Ferguson as Michael Rudder
- Clarence Geldart as Frank Raymond
- Georgie Stone as John Raymond
- Edythe Chapman as Grandma

== Preservation ==
With no copies of The Gypsy Trail located in any film archives, it is a lost film.
