= Girls (1919 film) =

1919 film by Walter Edwards

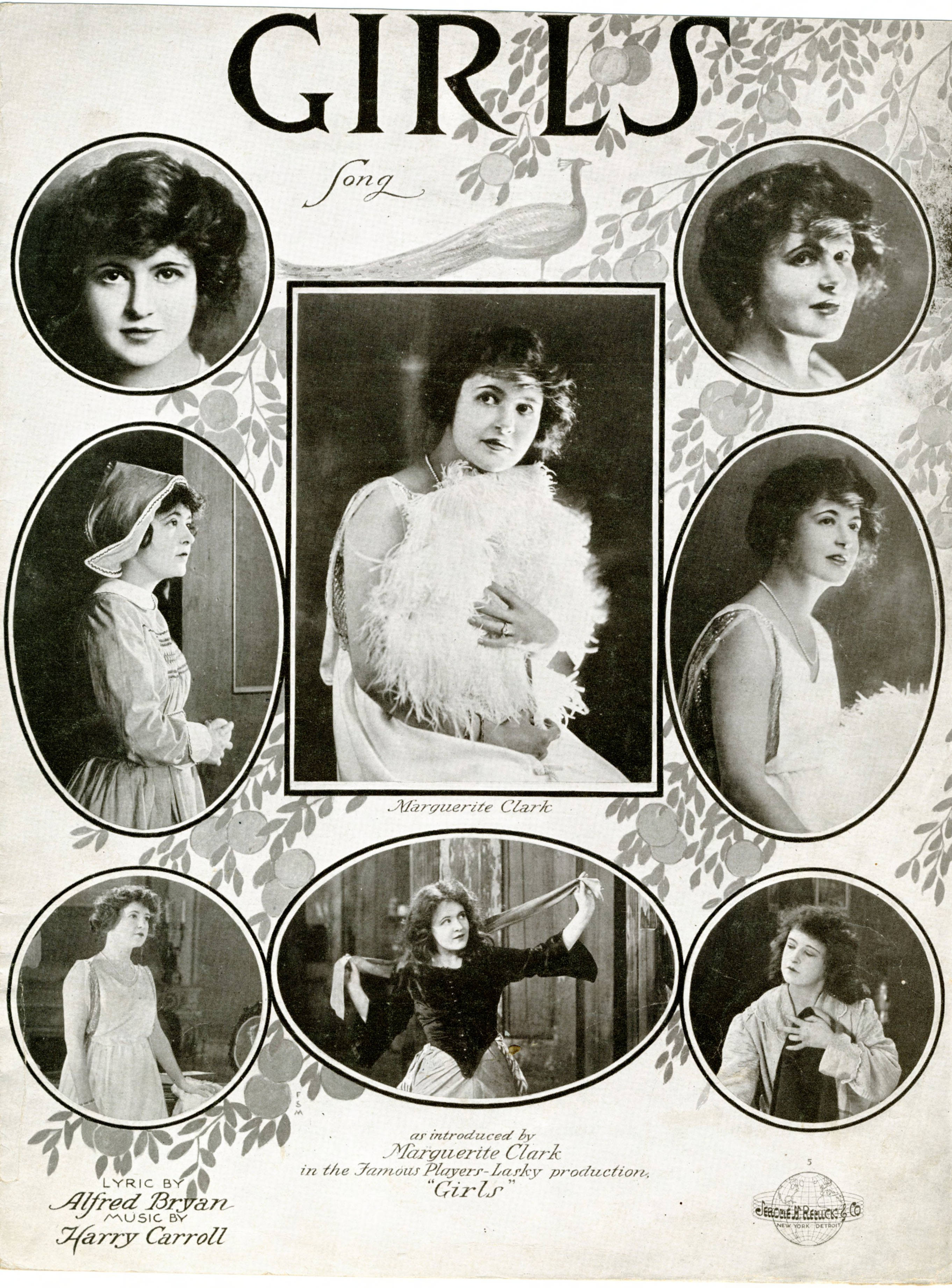
- Random stills from film included on a 1919 sheet-music cover.
- Directed by: Walter Edwards
- Written by: Clara Beranger (scenario); Alice Eyton (scenario)
- Based on: Girls by Clyde Fitch
- Cinematography: Hal Young; James Van Trees
- Production company: Famous Players–Lasky
- Distributed by: Paramount Pictures
- Release date: June 29, 1919
- Running time: 50 minutes
- Country: United States
- Language: Silent (English intertitles)

Girls is a 1919 American silent romantic comedy directed by Walter Edwards and starring Marguerite Clark. It is based on the 1909 Broadway play of the same name by Clyde Fitch starring Florence Reed in the part Clark plays in this film.

== Plot ==
As described in a film magazine, Pamela Gordon forms a man-haters club with her roommates Violet and Kate. Edgar Holt, victim of a flirtatious married woman, takes refuge from an irate husband in the young woman's room just as the man-haters are going to bed. He is impressed with Pamela and pockets an advertisement for a position that he finds. Pamela is indignant and he escapes to another room. Later, Pamela, Holt and Wilbur Searles are present at the mountain home of a wealthy friend. Holt intercedes when Searles tries to make love to Pamela. While there, the pair are given a chance to become better acquainted, but Pamela is still haughty towards Holt and all men in general. Holt tells his law partner George H. Sprague to answer Pamela's advertisement, and she is immediately given a position. Violet is also hired as a stenographer and, weakening on the man hating idea, falls in love with the head clerk. Sprague makes unwelcome advances on Pamela and she leaves, taking Violet with her. Meanwhile, Kate, the other member of the league, has secretly married her theatrical manager. Holt rents a room next to Pamela's to more easily court her. Violet announces her engagement and Kate then tells of her marriage. Holt knocks on the door but Pamela will not let him in. He goes around to a window, and, when he almost falls, Pamela drags him in with her arms around his neck. He puts his arms around her and she is compelled to admit that she loves him.

== Cast ==
- Marguerite Clark as Pamela Gordon
- Mary Warren as Violet
- Helene Chadwick as Kate West
- Harrison Ford as Edgar Holt
- Lee Hill as Frank Loot
- Thomas Persse as George H. Sprague
- Tom Ricketts as Mr. Dennett
- Clarissa Selwynne as Mrs. Dennett
- Arthur Edmund Carewe as Wilbur Searles
- Virginia Foltz as Lucille
- Myrtle Rishell as Nina Levering

== Preservation ==
With no prints of Girls located in any film archives, it is considered a lost film.
