= Romance and Arabella =

1919 American film directed by Walter Edwards

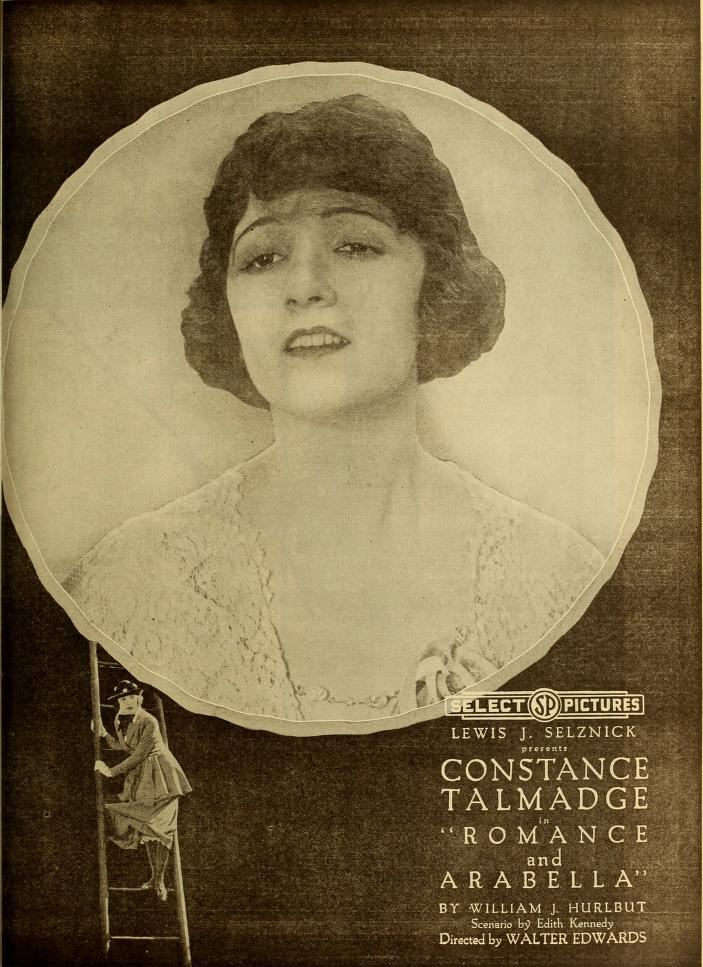
- Advertisement
- Directed by: Walter Edwards
- Written by: Edith Kennedy
- Based on: Romance and Arabella by William Hurlbut
- Produced by: Lewis J. Selznick
- Starring: Constance Talmadge; Harrison Ford; Monte Blue
- Cinematography: James Van Trees
- Production company: Selznick Pictures
- Distributed by: Select Pictures
- Release date: February 15, 1919
- Running time: 50 minutes
- Country: United States
- Language: Silent (English intertitles)

Romance and Arabella is a 1919 American silent romantic comedy film directed by Walter Edwards and starring Constance Talmadge, Harrison Ford, and Monte Blue.

== Plot ==
As described in a film magazine review, Arabella Cadenhouse is a very young widow and seeks thrills in her next match. She is loved by Bill, a long-time sweetheart, but decides that life with him would be too placid. Each man she meets attracts her anew. She finally decides on a noted doctor, but when he appears one-half hour late she becomes infuriated and refuses to marry him, and continues the wedding with Bill instead.

== Cast ==
- Constance Talmadge as Arabella Cadenhouse
- Harrison Ford as Bill
- Gertrude Claire as Aunt Effie
- Monte Blue as Harry Atteridge
- Arthur Edmund Carewe as Claude Estabrook
- Antrim Short as Peter Harper
- James Neill as Dr. Henry

== Bibliography ==
- Goble, Alan. The Complete Index to Literary Sources in Film. Walter de Gruyter, 1999.
