= The Veiled Adventure =

1919 film by Walter Edwards

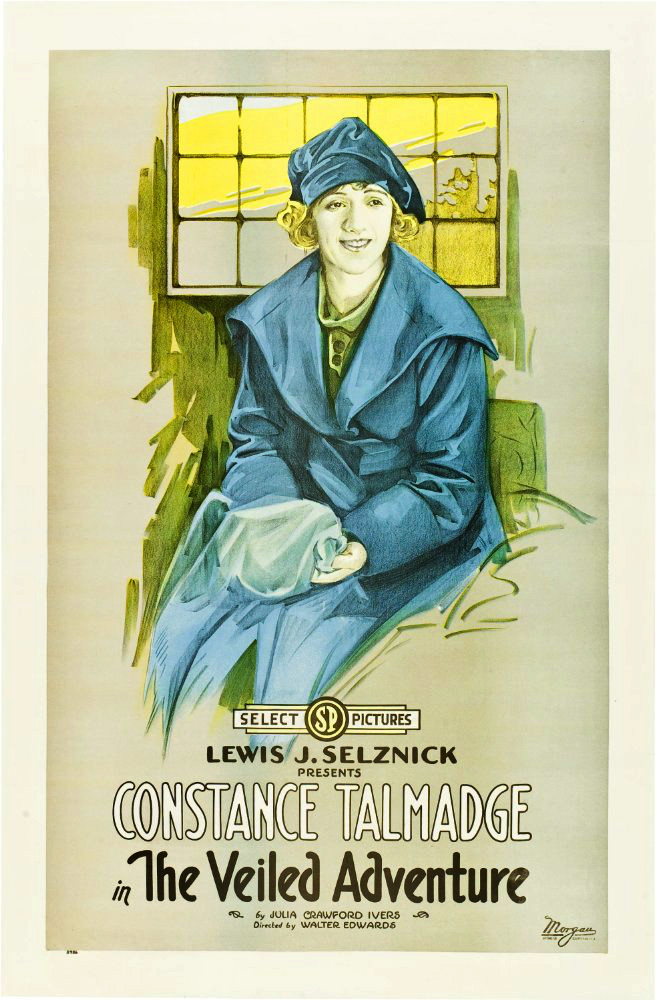
- Theatrical release poster
- Directed by: Walter Edwards
- Written by: Julia Crawford Ivers
- Produced by: Lewis J. Selznick
- Starring: Constance Talmadge; Harrison Ford; Stanhope Wheatcroft
- Cinematography: James Van Trees
- Production company: Selznick Pictures
- Distributed by: Select Pictures
- Release date: July 6, 1919
- Running time: 50 minutes
- Country: United States
- Language: Silent (English intertitles)

The Veiled Adventure is a 1919 American silent comedy film directed by Walter Edwards and starring Harrison Ford, Constance Talmadge, and Stanhope Wheatcroft.

== Plot ==
As described in a film magazine review, after she finds out that her fiancé has been faithless, Geraldine Barker, for a lark, decides to test the code of principles of her brother's friend Richard Annesly. He says that he would hate a woman who lies or steals and would never elope with one. Through a well laid out plot Geraldine arranges for Richard to find her stealing, lies to him, and finally gets him to propose an elopement with her. However, it all turns out all right as the two find that they really love each other and get married.

== Cast ==
- Harrison Ford as Richard Annesly
- Constance Talmadge as Geraldine Barker
- Stanhope Wheatcroft as Reginald Crocker
- Vera Doria as Mrs. Montrose
- Rosita Marstini as Mlle. Hortense
- T.D. Crittenden as Mr. Barker
- A. Edward Sutherland as Fred Barker
- Margaret Loomis as Diana Barker
- Vera Sisson as Eve Gardiner

== Bibliography ==
- Jeanine Basinger. Silent Stars. Wesleyan University Press, 2000. ISBN 0-8195-6451-6
