= Harrison Ford (silent film actor) =

American actor (1884–1957)

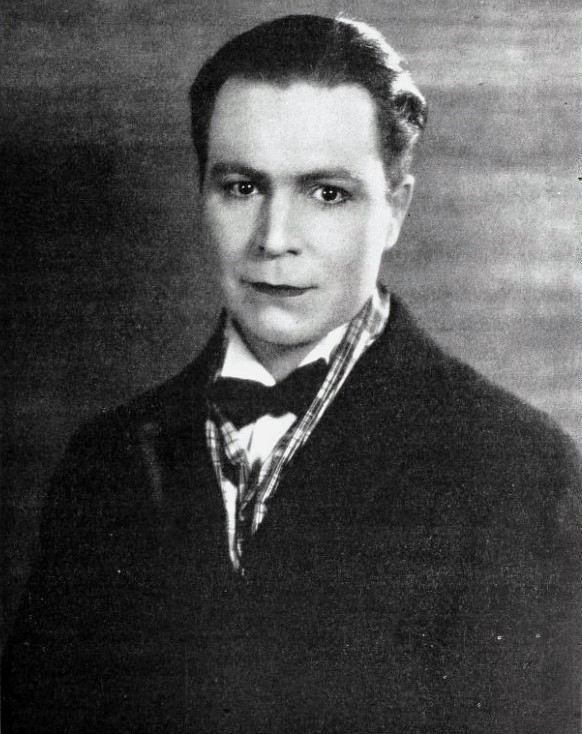
- Ford in 1925
- Born: March 16, 1884; Kansas City, Missouri, U.S.
- Died: December 2, 1957 (aged 73); Woodland Hills, Los Angeles, California, U.S.
- Occupation: Actor
- Years active: 1904–1932
- Spouse: Beatrice Prentice (m. 1909)

Harrison Ford (March 16, 1884 – December 2, 1957) was an early 20th-century American actor. He was a leading Broadway theater performer and a star of the silent film era.

== Career ==
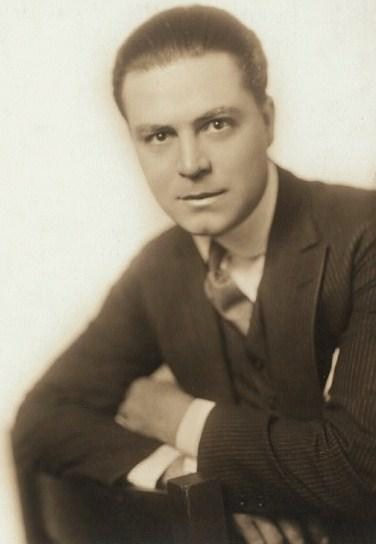
Ford, c. 1915

Ford was born in Kansas City, Missouri, the son of Anna and Walter. He began his acting career on the stage, and made his Broadway debut in 1904 in Richard Harding Davis's Ranson's Folly. He went on to appear in productions of William C. deMille's Strongheart; Glorious Betsy by Rida Johnson Young (the production lasted only 24 performances but the play was later adapted for an Oscar-nominated film of the same name); Bayard Veiller's The Fight (which quickly closed); Edgar Wallace's The Switchboard; Edward Locke's The Bubble; and Edgar Selwyn's Rolling Stones.

In 1915, Ford turned to film and moved to Hollywood. He became a leading man opposite stars such as Constance Talmadge, Norma Talmadge, Marie Prevost, Marion Davies, Marguerite De La Motte and Clara Bow. Ford's film career ended with the advent of talkies. His final film, and only talkie, Love in High Gear, was released in 1932. He returned to acting in the theatre, and also directed productions at the Little Theater of the Verdugos in Glendale, California. During World War II, he toured with the United Service Organizations (USO).

== Personal life ==
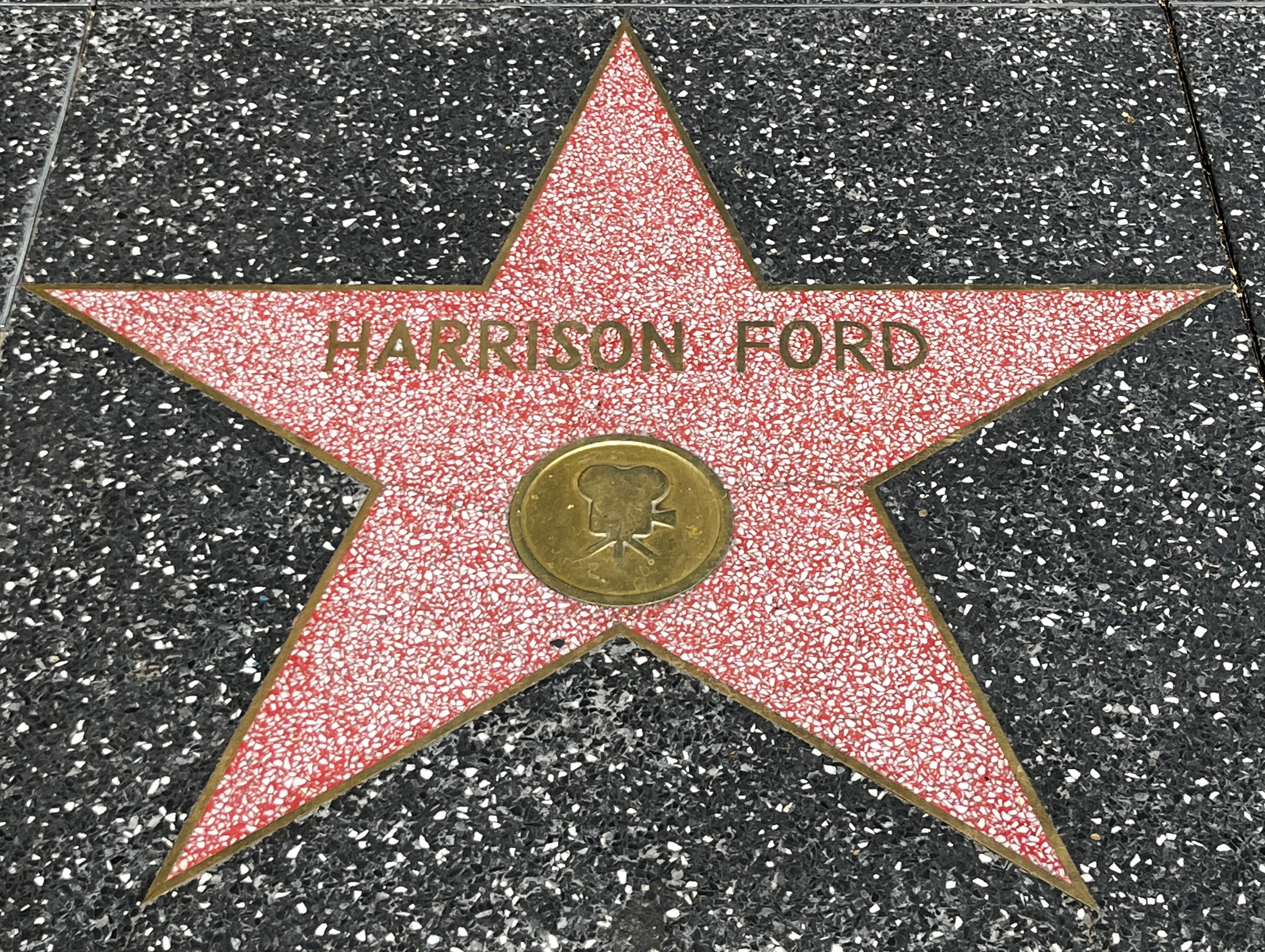
Star on the Hollywood Walk of Fame, 6665 Hollywood Blvd.

Ford married New York stage actress Beatrice Prentice (1884–1977), in Rochester, New York on March 29, 1909.

On September 13, 1951, he was struck by a car while out walking and severely injured. He never recovered, and spent the rest of his life at the Motion Picture & Television Country House and Hospital in Woodland Hills, California, and died there on December 2, 1957, at the age of 73. He was buried in the Forest Lawn Memorial Park Cemetery in Glendale.

For his contribution to the motion picture industry, Harrison Ford has a star on the Hollywood Walk of Fame in front of the Musso & Frank Grill at 6665 Hollywood Boulevard.

Ford has no known relation to the later film actor of the same name.

== Filmography ==
Year	Title	Role	Notes
1915	Excuse Me	Lt. Harry Mallory	
1916	Anton the Terrible	David Burkin	Alternative title: The Austrian Spy; Lost film, a fragment remains
1917	The Mysterious Mrs. M	Raymond Van Seer	Alternative title: The Mysterious Mrs. Musslewhite; Incomplete film, the Library of Congress has reels 1 and 2
1917	The Tides of Barnegat	Sidney Gray	Lost film
1917	On the Level	Joe Blanchard	Lost film
1917	A Roadside Impresario	Craig Winton	Lost film
1917	The Crystal Gazer	Dick Alden	Lost film
1917	The Sunset Trail	Kirk Levington	
1917	Molly Entangled	Barney Malone	Lost film
1918	Good Night, Paul	Paul Boudeaux	
1918	A Petticoat Pilot	Crawford Smith	Lost film
1918	Unclaimed Goods	Danny Donegan	Lost film
1918	Viviette	Austin Ware	Lost film
1918	A Pair of Silk Stockings	Sam Thornhill	
1918	Sauce for the Goose	John Constable	Lost film
1918	The Cruise of the Make-Believes	Gilbert Byfield	Lost film
1918	Such a Little Pirate	Rory O'Malley	Lost film
1918	Mrs. Leffingwell's Boots	Mr. Leffingwell	Lost film
1918	A Lady's Name	Noel Corcoran	Incomplete film, 4 of 5 reels survive
1919	Who Cares?	Martin Grey	Lost film
1919	You Never Saw Such a Girl	Eric Burgess	Lost film
1919	Girls	Edgar Holt	Lost film
1919	Experimental Marriage	Foxcroft Grey	Lost film
1919	The Veiled Adventure	Richard Annesly	
1919	The Lottery Man	Foxhall Peyton	Lost film
1919	Happiness a la Mode	Richard Townsend	Lost film
1919	The Third Kiss	Oliver Cloyne	Lost film
1919	Romance and Arabella	Bill	Lost film
1919	Hawthorne of the U.S.A.	Rodney Blake	
1920	Easy to Get	Bob Morehouse	Lost film
1920	A Lady in Love	Brent	Lost film
1920	Food for Scandal	Watt Dinwiile	
1920	Oh, Lady, Lady	Hale Underwood	Lost film
1920	Miss Hobbs	Wolff Kingsearl	
1920	Young Mrs. Winthrop	Douglas Winthrop	Lost film
1920	Her Beloved Villain	Martinot	Lost film
1921	The Passion Flower	Norbert	
1921	Wedding Bells	Reginald Carter	Lost film
1921	A Heart to Let	Burton Forbes	Lost film
1921	The Wonderful Thing	Donald Mannerby	
1921	Love's Redemption	Clifford Standish	Lost film
1922	Foolish Wives	Rude Soldier/Armless Soldier	Uncredited
1922	Smilin' Through	Kenneth Wayne/Jeremiah Wayne	
1922	When Love Comes	Peter Jamison	Lost film
1922	Find the Woman	Philip Vandevent	Incomplete film
1922	The Old Homestead	Reuben Whitcomb	
1922	Her Gilded Cage	Lawrence Pell	Lost film
1922	Shadows	John Malden	With Lon Chaney
1922	The Primitive Lover	Hector Tomley	
1923	Vanity Fair	George Osborne	Lost film
1923	Maytime	Richard Wayne	Incomplete film, 4 of 7 reels survive
1923	Little Old New York	John O'Day	
1923	Bright Lights of Broadway	Thomas Drake	
1924	The Average Woman	Jimmy Munroe	
1924	A Fool's Awakening	John Briggs	
1924	Three Miles Out	John Locke	
1924	The Price of a Party	Robert Casson	Incomplete film
1924	Janice Meredith	Charles Fownes	
1925	The Mad Marriage	Walter Butler	Lost film
1925	Proud Flesh	Don Jaime	
1925	Lovers in Quarantine	Anthony Blunt	
1925	That Royle Girl	Fred Ketlar	Lost film
1925	The Marriage Whirl	Tom Carrol	Lost film
1925	The Wheel	Ted Morton	Lost film
1925	Zander the Great	Dan Murchinson	
1926	The Song and Dance Man	Joseph Murdock	Incomplete film, first two reels are missing
1926	Up in Mabel's Room	Garry Ainsworth	
1926	Hell's Four Hundred	John North	Lost film
1926	Almost a Lady	William Duke	
1926	Sandy	Ramon Worth	
1926	The Nervous Wreck	Henry Williams	
1927	The Night Bride	Stanley Warrington	Lost film
1927	The Rejuvenation of Aunt Mary	Jack Watkins	Lost film
1927	The Girl in the Pullman	Dr. Donald A. Burton	
1927	No Control	John Douglas Jr	
1927	Rubber Tires	Bill James	
1928	Golf Widows	Charles Bateman	
1928	Let 'Er Go Gallegher	Henry Clay Callahan	
1928	The Rush Hour	Dan Morley	
1928	A Woman Against the World	Schuyler Van Loan	Lost film
1928	A Blonde for a Night	Bob Webster	
1928	Just Married	Jack Stanley	Lost film
1928	Three Weekends	Turner	Lost film, fragments exist
1929	The Flattering Word	Eugene Tesh	Short film
1929	Her Husband's Women	The Philandering Portrait Painter	Short film
1932	Love in High Gear	Donald Ransome	

== Bibliography ==
- Golden, Eve (2001). Golden Images: 41 Essays On Silent Film Stars. McFarland. ISBN 0-7864-0834-0.
