= Who Cares? (1919 film) =

1919 Silent film by Walter Edwards

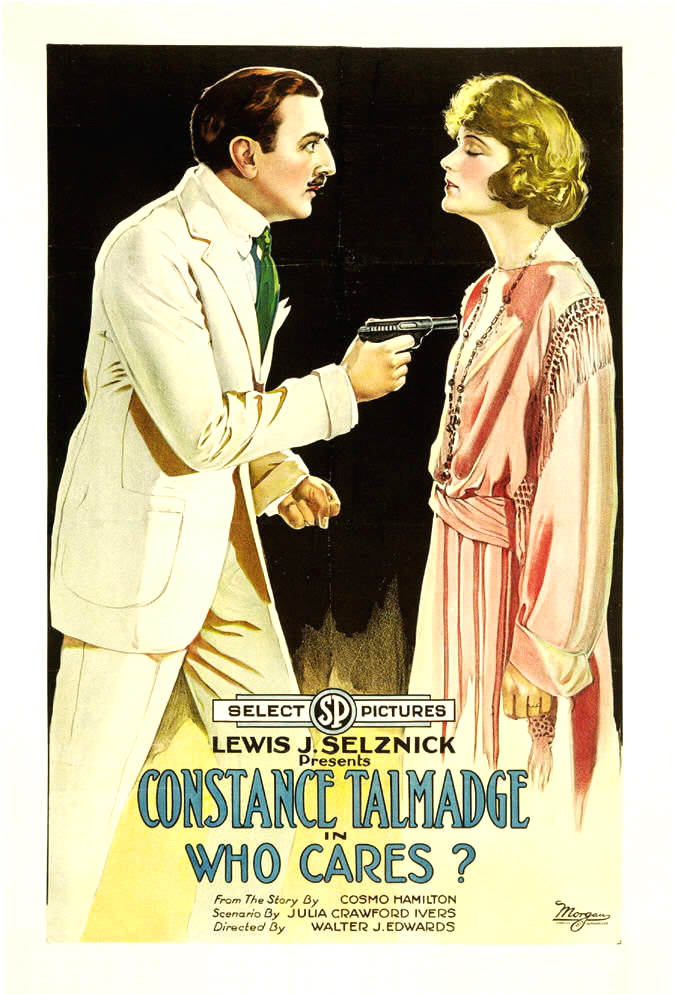
- Film poster
- Directed by: Walter Edwards
- Written by: Cosmo Hamilton (novel: Who Cares?); Julia Crawford Ivers (scenario)
- Produced by: Lewis J. Selznick
- Starring: Constance Talmadge; Harrison Ford
- Cinematography: James Van Trees
- Production company: Selznick Pictures
- Distributed by: Select Pictures Corporation
- Release date: January 25, 1919
- Running time: 50 minutes
- Country: United States
- Language: Silent (English intertitles)

Who Cares? is a lost 1919 American silent film comedy starring Constance Talmadge and Harrison Ford. The director was Walter Edwards who usually worked with Marguerite Clark. Julia Crawford Ivers wrote the scenario based on the 1919 Cosmo Hamilton novel, and her son James Van Trees was the film's cinematographer.

It was filmed again in 1925 by upstart studio Columbia Pictures as Who Cares.

== Plot ==
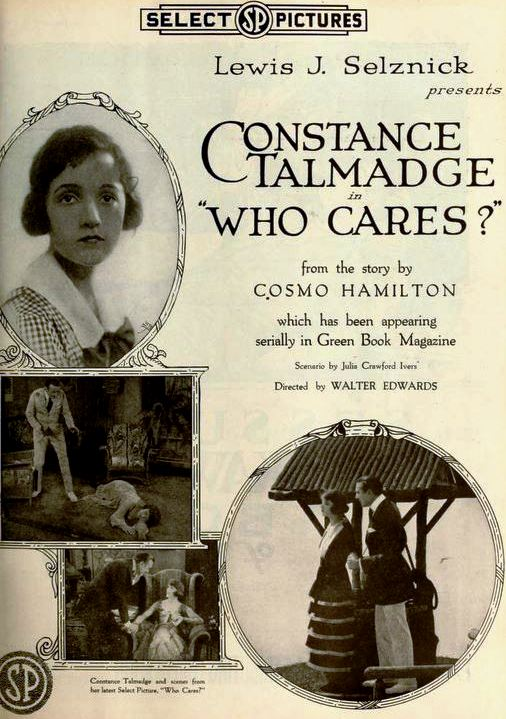
Ad for the film

As described in a film magazine, Joan Ludlow (Talmadge) is living with her grandparents, a grouchy old couple, when a young man, Martin Grey (Ford), moves next door. After the grandparents discover that they have been having secretly meetings for happy and harmless fun, Joan receives such a scolding that she goes over to Martin's and asks him to take her to her friend Alice Palgrave (Randolph), who lives in the city. Upon arrival at the Palgrave residence they discover Alice is not there, and Martin offers to marry Joan to resolve the situation. Pleased with the arrangement, Joan accepts, and after the ceremony they live in Martin's city residence, where he continues to respect her extreme innocence and maidenly existence.

Martin spends time at the club while Joan is free to attend several wild parties and conducts what she supposes is an innocent flirtation with Alice's husband, Gilbert (MacDonald). Toodles (Anderson), a chorus girl from the club, tempts Martin on his yacht, but he knows how to resist her. However, when Joan discovers that Toodles is visiting her husband at the country home, she flirts harder with Gilbert Palgrave. Gilbert, who is suffering from a medical condition ("brain fever"), gets Joan alone one night in a seaside cottage, and threatens to shoot himself unless she consents to his desires. Martin arrives in time to save the day, with Joan discovering her love for Martin and Martin taking her back as his wife.

== Cast ==
- Constance Talmadge - Joan Ludlow
- Harrison Ford - Martin Grey
- Donald MacDonald - Gilbert Palgrave
- California Truman - Mrs. Ludlow
- Spottiswoode Aitken - Mr. Ludlow
- Beverly Randolph - Alice Palgrave
- Claire Anderson - Toodles
- Gerard Alexander - Mrs. Hosack
- J. Morris Foster - Howard Oldershaw
- J. Park Jones - Harry Oldershaw
- Dorothy Hagan - Irene (*billed Dorothy Hagar)
- Tom Bates - Butler
