= Widow by Proxy =

1919 film by Walter Edwards

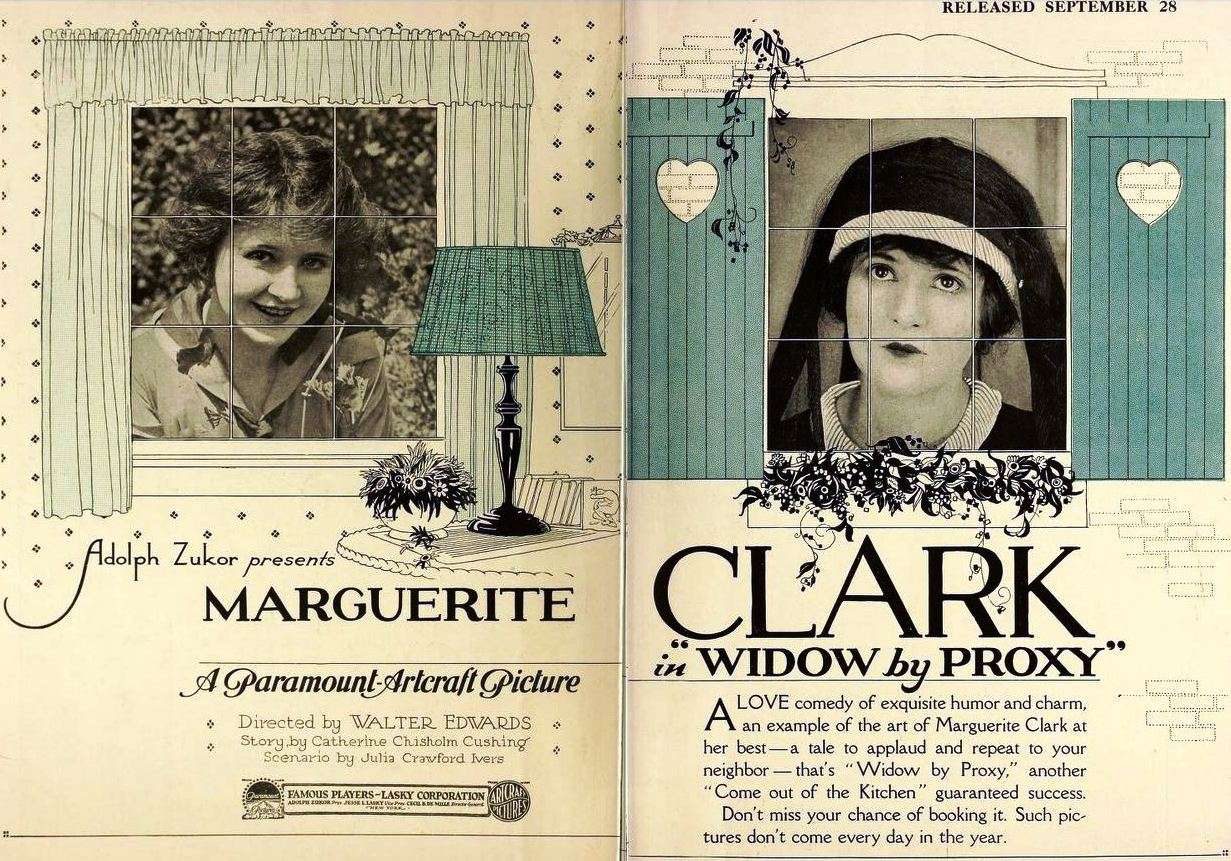
- Period advertisement
- Directed by: Walter Edwards; Fred Robinson ( assistant director)
- Written by: Julia Crawford Ivers (scenario)
- Based on: Widow by Proxy by Catherine Chisholm Cushing
- Produced by: Adolph Zukor; Jesse Lasky
- Starring: Marguerite Clark
- Cinematography: Hal Young; James Van Trees
- Distributed by: Paramount Pictures
- Release date: September 28, 1919
- Running time: 50 minutes; 5 reels
- Country: United States
- Language: Silent

Widow by Proxy is a 1919 American silent romantic comedy film produced by Famous Players–Lasky and distributed by Paramount Pictures. It is based on a 1913 Broadway play by Catherine Chisholm Cushing that starred May Irwin. Julia Crawford Ivers provided the scenario and her son James Van Trees was one of the cinematographers. It is not known whether the film currently survives.

== Cast ==
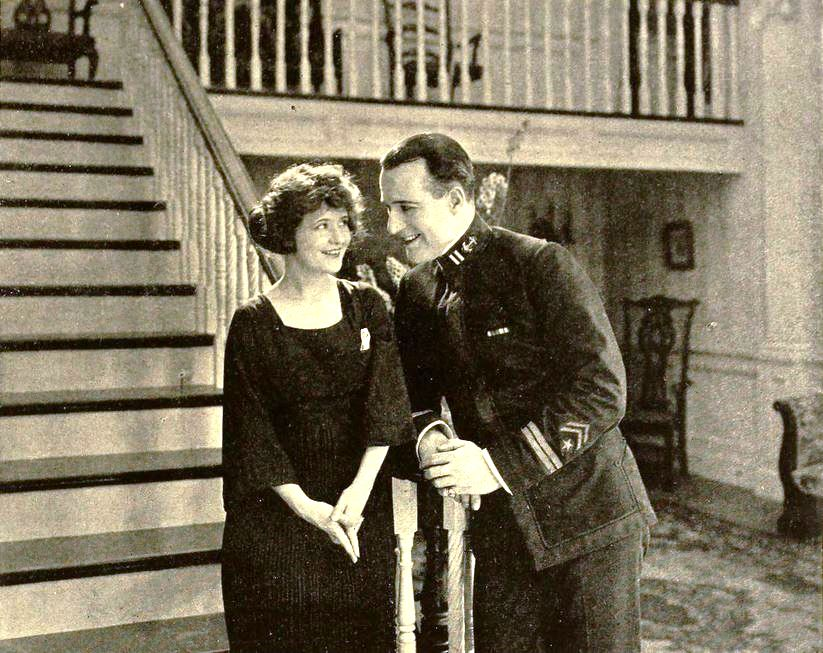
Production still for Widow by Proxy (1919)

- Marguerite Clark as Gloria Grey
- Agnes Vernon as Dolores Pennington (credited as Brownie Vernon)
- Gertrude Norman as Sophronia Pennington
- Gertrude Claire as Angelica Pennington
- Nigel Barrie as Lt. Steven Pennington
- John Gilbert as Jack Pennington (credited as Jack Gilbert)
- Al W. Filson as Alexander P. Galloway (credited as A.W. Filson)
- Rosita Marstini as Madame Gilligan
