= The Girl in the Pullman =

1927 film by Erle C. Kenton

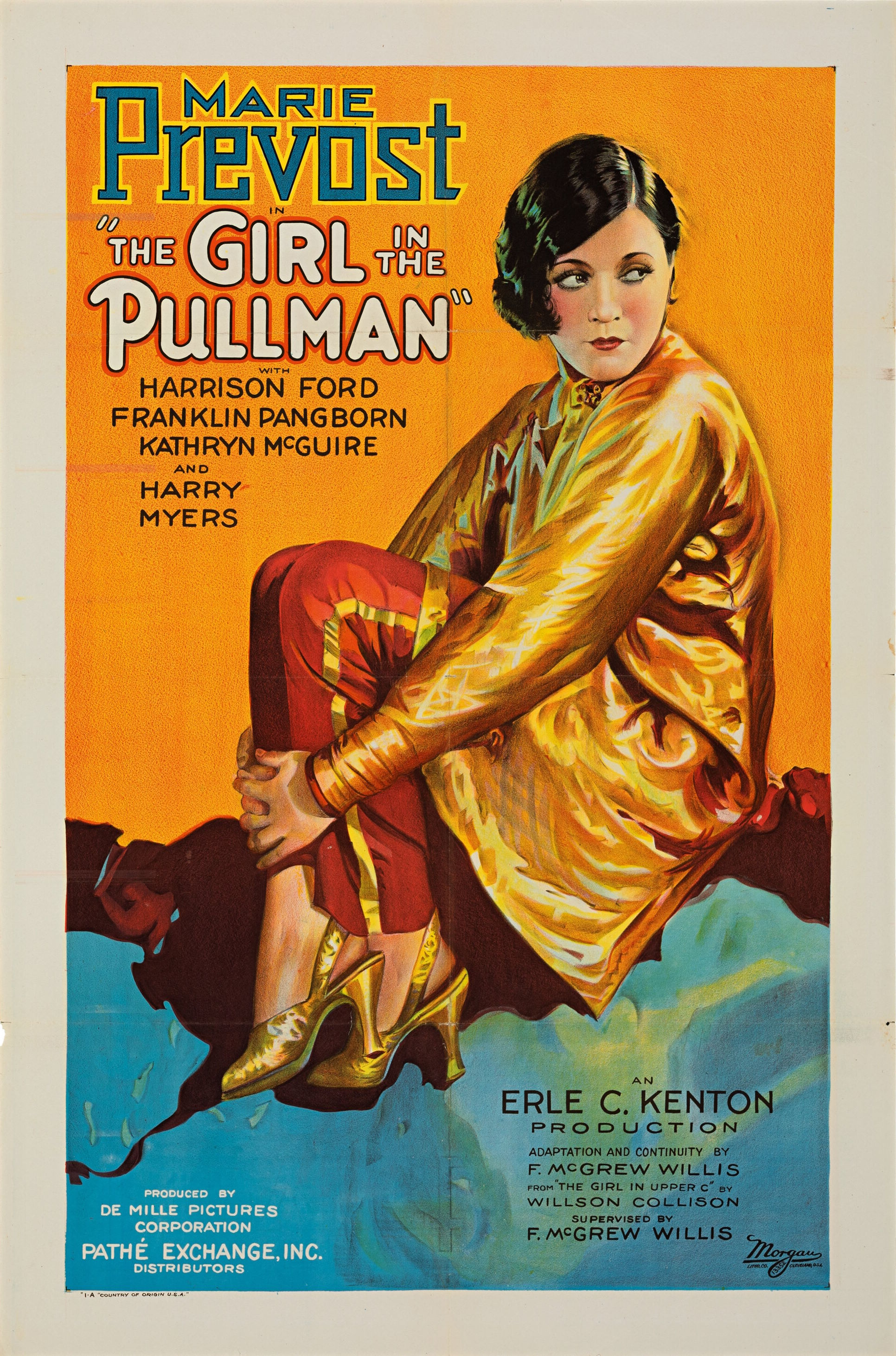
- Theatrical release poster
- Directed by: Erle C. Kenton
- Written by: F. McGrew Willis
- Based on: "The Girl in Upper C" by Wilson Collison
- Starring: Marie Prevost; Harrison Ford; Franklin Pangborn
- Cinematography: Dewey Wrigley
- Edited by: James B. Morley
- Production company: DeMille Pictures Corporation
- Distributed by: Pathé Exchange
- Release date: October 31, 1927
- Running time: 60 minutes
- Country: United States
- Language: Silent (English intertitles)

The Girl in the Pullman is a 1927 American silent comedy film directed by Erle C. Kenton and starring Marie Prevost, Harrison Ford, and Franklin Pangborn.

== Cast ==
- Marie Prevost as Irene Burton
- Harrison Ford as Dr. Donald A. Burton
- Franklin Pangborn as Hector Brooks
- Kathryn McGuire as Dollie Jones
- Ethel Wales as Mrs. Jones
- Harry Myers as Jimmy Mason
- Heinie Conklin as Old Black Joe
- William Irving as Oscar McGuff

== Preservation status ==
Prints of The Girl in the Pullman are held in the French archive Centre national du cinéma et de l'image animée in Fort de Bois-d'Arcy and the UCLA Film & Television Archive.

== Bibliography ==
- Munden, Kenneth White. The American Film Institute Catalog of Motion Pictures Produced in the United States, Part 1. University of California Press, 1997.
