= The Shuttle (film) =

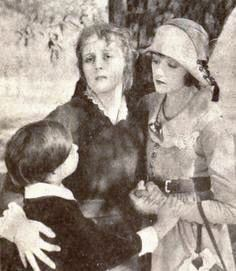
- Directed by: Rollin S. Sturgeon
- Written by: Frances Hodgson Burnett (novel); Margaret Turnbull; Harvey F. Thew
- Produced by: Lewis J. Selznick
- Starring: Constance Talmadge; Alan Roscoe; Edith Johnson
- Cinematography: James Van Trees
- Production company: Select Pictures
- Distributed by: Select Pictures
- Release date: February 16, 1918
- Running time: 50 minutes
- Country: United States
- Languages: Silent; English intertitles

The Shuttle is a 1918 American silent romance film directed by Rollin S. Sturgeon and starring Constance Talmadge, Alan Roscoe and Edith Johnson. The film is an adaptation of the novel of the same title by Frances Hodgson Burnett. It concerns two American sisters, one of whom is married into an English family.

== Cast ==
- Constance Talmadge as Bettina Vandepoel
- Alan Roscoe as Lord Mount Dunstan
- Edith Johnson as Rosalie Vanderpoel
- Edwin B. Tilton as Reuben Vanderpoel
- Helen Dunbar as Mrs. Vanderpoel
- George A. McDaniel as Sir Nigel Anstruthers
- Thomas Persse as Penzance
- Edward Peil Sr. as Ughtred Anstruthers
- Casson Ferguson as G. Selden

== Bibliography ==
- Jeanine Basinger. Silent Stars. Wesleyan University Press, 2000.
