= Wedding Bells (1921 film) =

1921 film

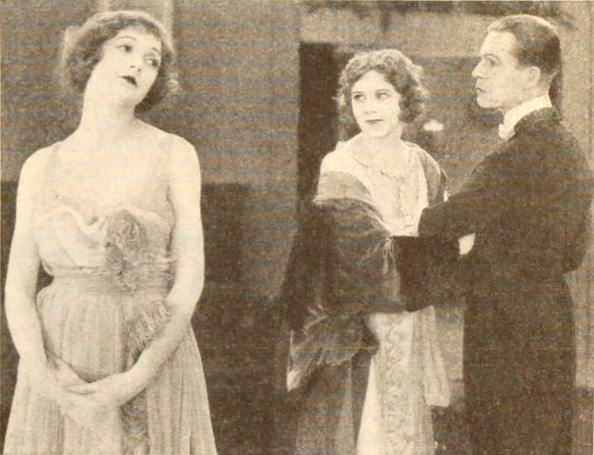
- Film still
- Directed by: Chester Withey
- Written by: Zelda Crosby
- Based on: Wedding Bells; 1919 play by Edward Salisbury Field
- Produced by: Joseph M. Schenck
- Starring: Constance Talmadge; Harrison Ford
- Cinematography: Oliver T. Marsh
- Production company: Constance Talmadge Film Company
- Distributed by: Associated First National Pictures
- Release date: June 17, 1921
- Running time: 60 minutes
- Country: United States
- Language: Silent (English intertitles)

Wedding Bells is a lost 1921 American silent romantic-comedy film directed by Chester Withey and starring Constance Talmadge and Harrison Ford.

== Plot ==
As described in a film magazine, Rosalie Wayne meets Reginald Carter after he introduces himself while chasing her dog with one of his oxfords, and she marries him in haste. Reggie comes down with the measles following a quarrel over her bobbed hair, not knowing he is ill she leaves for Reno and then Europe. After a year's absence and having secured her divorce, she meets Reggie again and finds him engaged to another. Jealousy arouses her to break up the match, but the wedding is progressing before she devises a means of doing so. Reggie, however, is satisfied and glad to be reunited with his Rosalie despite her sharp tongue and unusual method of winning his love.

== Cast ==
- Constance Talmadge as Rosalie Wayne
- Harrison Ford as Reginald Carter
- Emily Chichester as Marcia Hunter
- Ida Darling as Mme. Hunter
- James Harrison as Douglas Ordway
- William Roselle as Spencer Wells
- Polly Bailey as Hooper (credited as Polly Van)
- Dallas Welford as Jackson
- Frank Honda as Fuzisaki
