= Charles Eyton =

American film producer

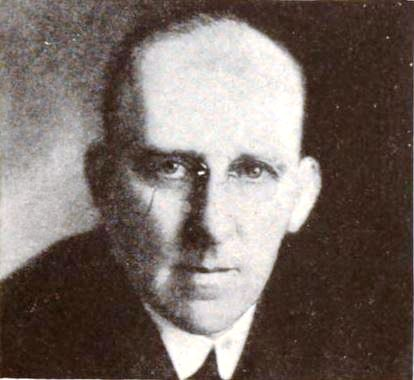
- Eyton in 1921
- Born: 24 June 1871; Parnell, Auckland, New Zealand
- Died: 2 July 1941 (aged 70); Hollywood, California, US
- Occupation: Producer
- Spouse(s): Anna S. Cole (m.1900–div.1901); Bessie Eyton (m.1908–div.1915); Kathlyn Williams (m.1916–div.1931)
- Relatives: Alice Eyton (sister); Vera Doria (sister)

Charles Eyton (24 June 1871 – 2 July 1941) was an actor-producer who became general manager of Famous Players–Lasky Corporation (a Paramount Pictures subsidiary) during the silent film era.

== Personal life ==
The second of five children, Charles F. Eyton was the son of journalist Robert Henry Eyton (–1885) and Eleanor Maud Eyton (née Fosbery), and born in Parnell, Auckland, New Zealand. His sisters were singer/actress Vera Doria, and writer Alice Eyton, who died of burns in 1929 after her masquerade costume was accidentally set alight.

In 1900 Charles Eyton married Anna S. Cole. They were divorced in May 1901.

On 3 September 1908, Charles Eyton married actress Bessie Harrison, who would henceforth use the professional name Bessie Eyton. They were divorced on 16 March 1915.

He became a United States citizen in December 1915.

On 2 June 1916, Charles Eyton married actress Kathlyn Williams. It was her third marriage. They were divorced in 1931 on the grounds of incompatibility, with Williams not seeking any payments from Eyton.

He died of pneumonia in Hollywood on 2 July 1941.

== Career ==
=== Wrestling ===
After establishing his reputation as a lightweight wrestler, standing 5 feet 9 inches (1.75 m) and weighing 9 stone 3 pounds (59 kg; 129 lb), in 1889 Eyton sailed from Australia to the United States, where he participated in a series of wrestling matches.

In 1900, he came to Los Angeles and became assistant manager of the Burbank Theater and an officer of the Los Angeles Athletic Club. He also worked as a boxing referee for over a decade, and was featured on a cigarette sports trading card in 1910. The championship bouts refereed by Charles Eyton included:

| Year | Class | Boxers |
|---|---|---|
| 1906 | heavyweight | Tommy Burns vs. Marvin Hart |
| 1911 | lightweight | Ad Wolgast vs. George Memsic |
| 1912 | featherweight | Johnny Kilbane vs. Abe Attell |
| 1913 | heavyweight | Jess Willard vs. John "Bull" Young (fatal fight) |

=== Motion pictures ===
Eyton formed the Real Art Picture Corporation in 1908.

In 1914, Frank Garbutt created the Oliver Morosco Photoplay Company, named after Oliver Morosco. Charles Eyton was appointed to supervise the company's productions and also the productions of Bosworth, Inc., which were produced in the same studio at 201 N. Occidental, in Los Angeles. Bosworth, Inc. soon folded and was replaced by Pallas Pictures. In 1916, Morosco and Pallas became part of Famous Players–Lasky, and Charles Eyton remained manager of the Morosco studio. In 1919, Eyton became manager of the larger Famous Players–Lasky studio at Sunset and Vine in Hollywood.

In 1925, he was appointed to be in charge of Paramount productions abroad. Adolph Zukor announced the special production unit would include a production of D. W. Griffith's adaption of Marie Corelli's novel, The Sorrows of Satan; with Eyton described as having been in charge of the Paramount studio and was 'voted unqualifiedly the most popular man in the entire motion picture colony'.

He resigned from Paramount in 1926.

== William Taylor's murder ==
On 1 February 1922, Charles Eyton was one of the first people to arrive on the scene of the murder of film director William Desmond Taylor (1872–1922), and was said to have been the person to have discovered that Taylor was shot when he attempted to raise the body. Eyton was interviewed by police, ostensibly in relation to means of locating the deceased's missing butler, and Eyton denied knowing about letters apparently missing from Taylor's house. There were a number of possible suspects and it remains a cold case today.
