= The Edge of the Abyss =

1915 film by Walter Edwards

- Directed by: Walter Edwards
- Written by: C. Gardner Sullivan
- Produced by: Kay-Bee Productions
- Starring: Mary Boland; Robert McKim
- Cinematography: Devereaux Jennings (*as J.D. Jennings) (fr)
- Music by: Joseph Nurnberger; Victor Schertzinger
- Distributed by: Triangle Film Corporation
- Release dates: December 26, 1915; 1919 (rereleased as On the Edge of the Abyss)
- Running time: 5 reels
- Country: USA
- Language: Silent...English titles

The Edge of the Abyss is a lost 1915 silent drama film directed by Walter Edwards and distributed by Triangle Film Corporation. It stars Mary Boland, then a stage comedic actress, in her film debut. Thomas H. Ince, one of the three key founders of Triangle, served as supervisor on the picture.

== Cast ==
- Mary Boland - Alma Clayton
- Robert McKim - Neil Webster
- Frank R. Mills - Wayne Burroughs (*this Frank Mills born 1870 died 1921)
- Willard Mack - Jim Sims
