= A Lady's Name =

1918 American comedy-drama film directed by Walter Edwards

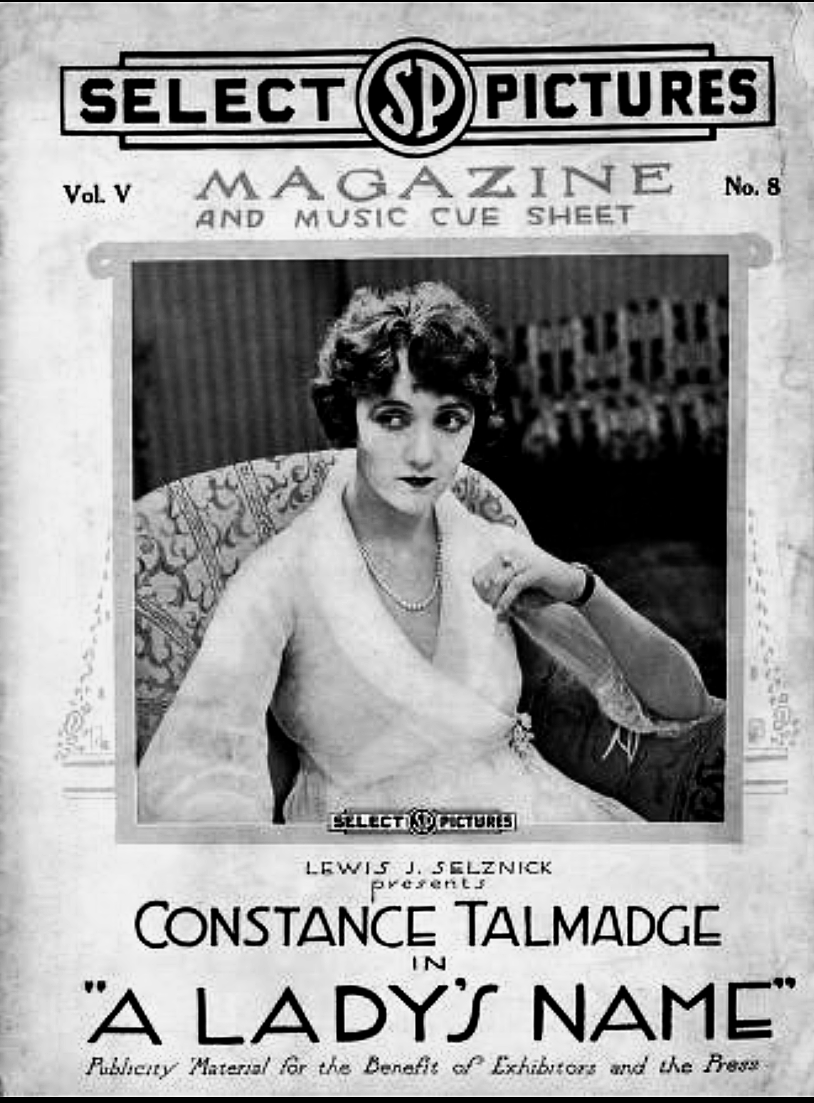
- Magazine ad
- Directed by: Walter Edwards
- Written by: Cyril Harcourt (Play); Julia Ivers (Adaptation)
- Produced by: Select Pictures Corporation
- Starring: Constance Talmadge; Harrison Ford; Emory Johnson
- Cinematography: James Van Trees
- Distributed by: Select Pictures Corporation
- Release date: March 1918
- Running time: 5 reels
- Country: USA
- Language: Silent (English intertitles

A Lady's Name is a 1918 American silent drama-comedy film directed by Walter Edwards. The film stars Constance Talmadge, Harrison Ford and Emory Johnson. The film was released on December 10, 1918, by Select Pictures.

== Background ==
A Lady's Name is a screen version of a play written for the stage by Cyril Harcourt. His play was adapted for the screen by Julia Crawford Ivers.

== Plot ==
Novelist Mabel Vere (Constance Talmadge) is engaged to Gerald Wantage (Emory Johnson). Mabel is also writing a new book. She needs ideas for her new book. She hatches a plan to advertise for a husband and see if the candidates provide the literary inspiration she needs. Gerald is a "stuffed Shirt" who angrily objects to her plan. She proceeds anyway.

It is decided that Mabel's roommate, Maud Bray (Vera Doria), will screen all responders and frighten away the less desirable suitors. This allows Mabel to respond to the more interesting letters. Shortly, Mabel becomes embroiled in a number of adventures.

One of her applicants is a butler. He is employed by Noel Corcoran (Harrison Ford). As it turns out, Noel has also answered the ad. Noel informs Mabel that Gerald has bet the other members of his club that she will stop answering letters.

Mabel is furious. She starts responding to several particularly lurid letters. Gerald promptly breaks off their engagement. Meanwhile, Noel, who is rich, has fallen in love with Mabel. Noel gets down on his knee and proposes. Mabel accepts his proposal.

== Cast ==
Actor	Role
Constance Talmadge	Mabel Vere
Harrison Ford	Noel Corcoran
Emory Johnson	Gerald Wantage
Vera Doria	Maud Bray
Jim Farley	Flood
Fred Huntley	Adams
John Steppling	Bird
Truman Van Dyke	Bentley
Lillian Leighton	Mrs. Haines
ZaSu Pitts	Emily
Emily Gerdes	Margaret

== Preservation status ==
According to the Library of Congress website, 4 out of 5 reels of this film survive. The archived copy of this film is stored at New York's Museum of Modern Art.

== Gallery ==
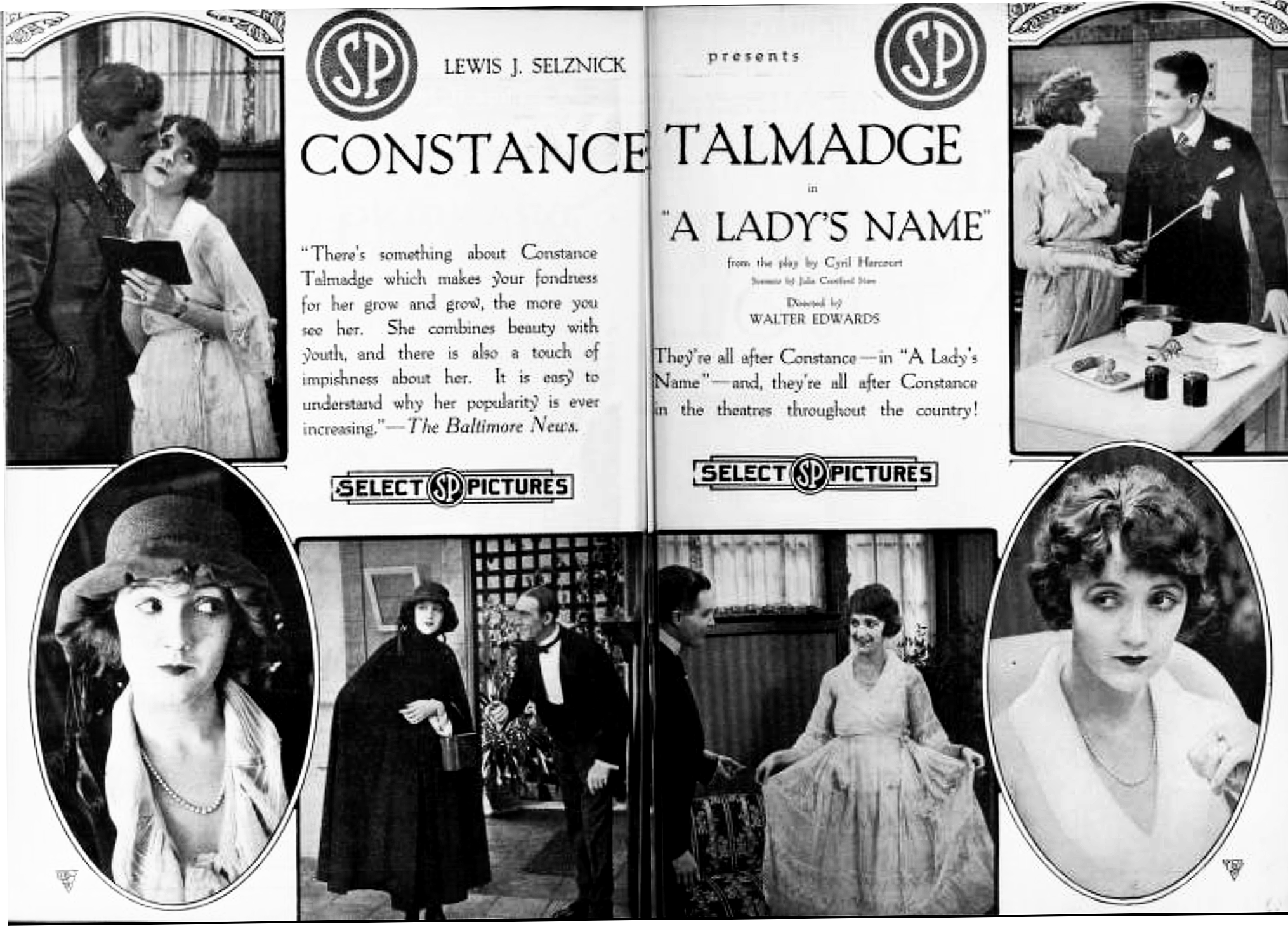
Magazine ad for the movie

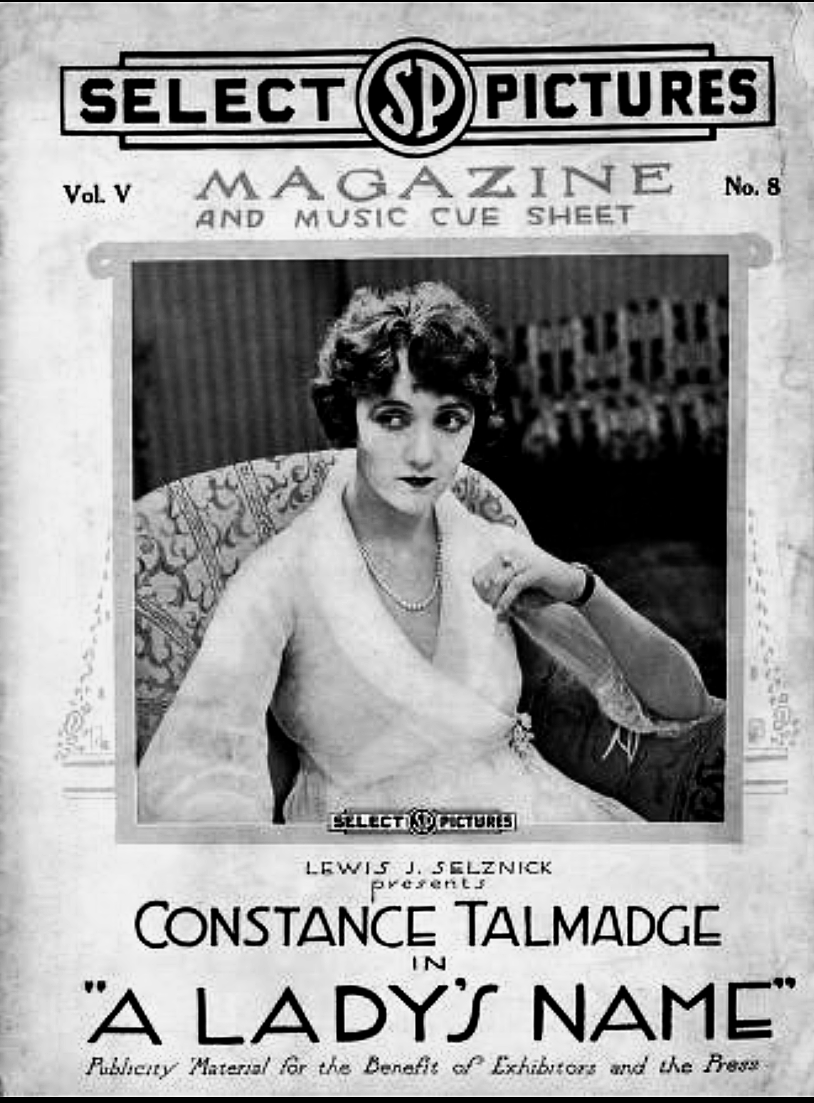
Magazine ad for the movie

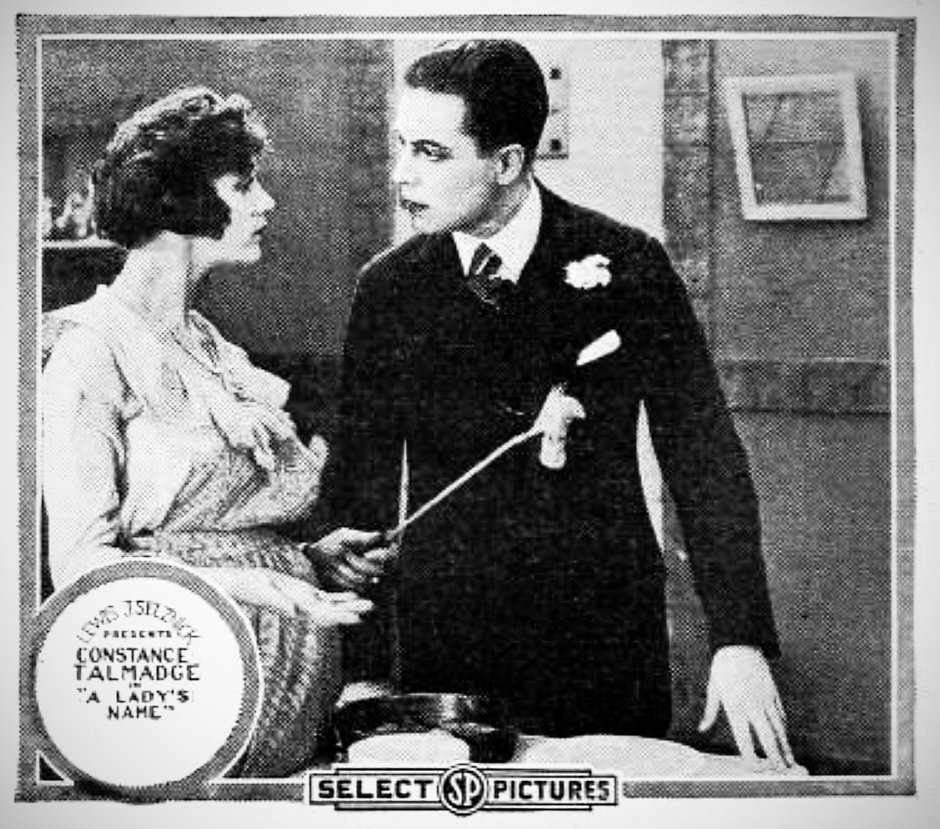
Still from the movie

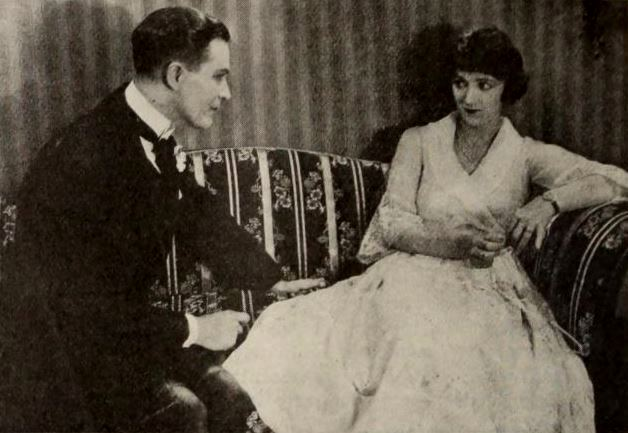
Still from the movie

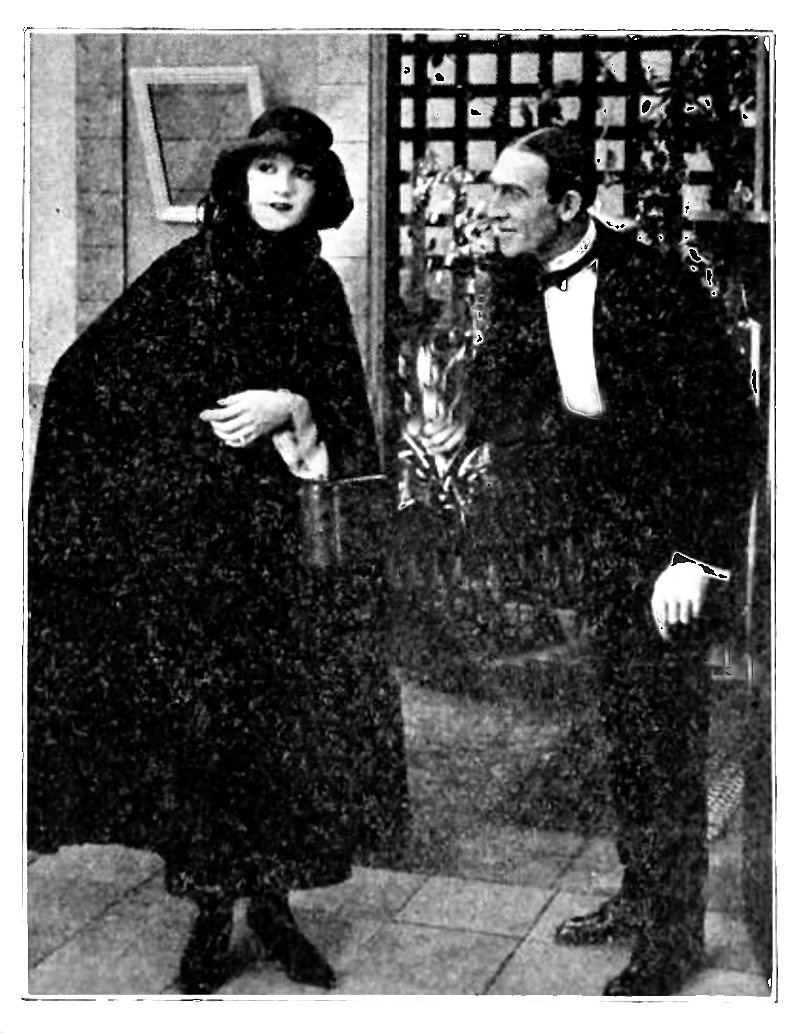
Still from the movie

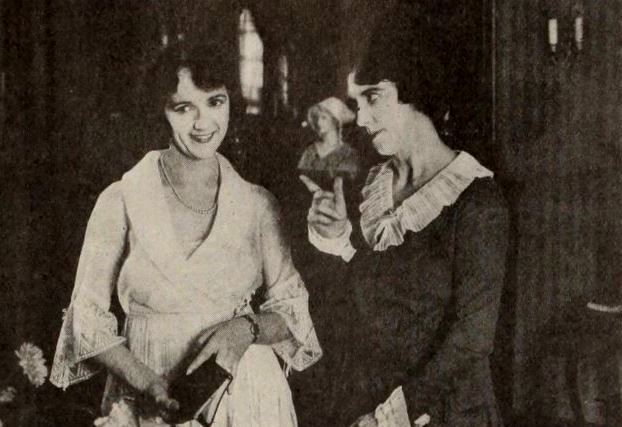
Still from the movie
