= Experimental Marriage =

1919 American silent romantic comedy film directed by Robert G. Vignola

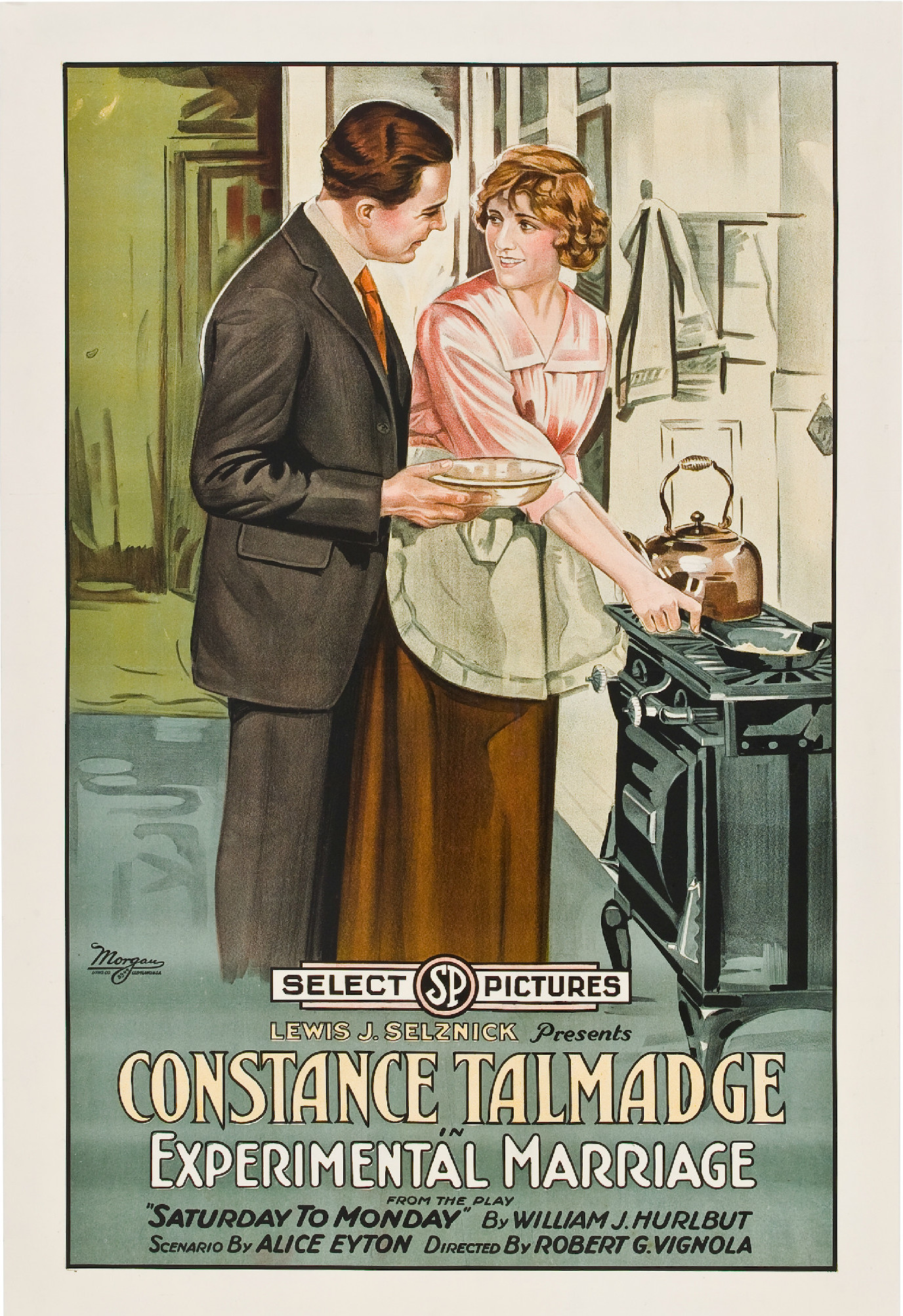
- Poster
- Directed by: Robert G. Vignola
- Written by: Alice Eyton
- Based on: Saturday to Monday by William Hurlbut
- Produced by: Lewis J. Selznick
- Starring: Constance Talmadge; Harrison Ford; Walter Hiers
- Cinematography: Frank E. Garbutt
- Production company: Selznick Pictures
- Distributed by: Select Pictures
- Release date: March 10, 1919
- Running time: 50 minutes
- Country: United States
- Language: Silent

Experimental Marriage is a 1919 American silent film in the romantic comedy directed by Robert G. Vignola and starring Constance Talmadge, Harrison Ford, and Walter Hiers.

== Cast ==
- Constance Talmadge as Suzanne Ercoll
- Harrison Ford as Foxcroft Grey
- Walter Hiers as Charlie Hamilton
- Vera Sisson as Do Harrington
- Edythe Chapman as Mrs. Ercoll
- Raymond Hatton as Arthur Barnard
- Mayme Kelso as Mrs. Entwhisle
- James Gordon as Callahan

== Bibliography ==
- Langman, Larry. American Film Cycles: The Silent Era. Greenwood Publishing, 1998.
