= Easy to Get =

1920 film by Walter Edwards

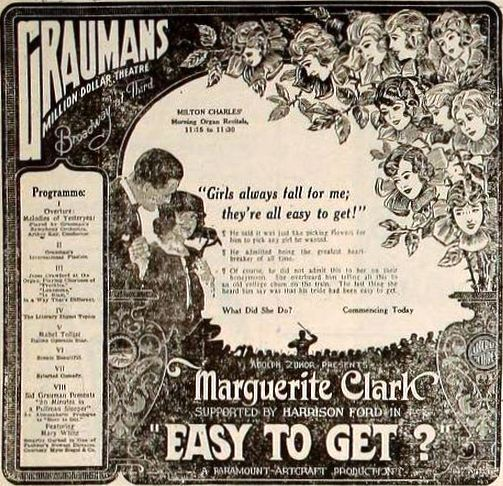
- Ad for film
- Directed by: Walter Edwards
- Written by: Julia Crawford Ivers; Mann Page (story)
- Produced by: Adolph Zukor; Jesse Lasky
- Starring: Marguerite Clark; Harrison Ford
- Cinematography: Hal Young
- Distributed by: Paramount Pictures
- Release date: March 28, 1920
- Running time: 50 minutes; 5 reels
- Country: United States
- Language: Silent (English intertitles)

Easy to Get is a lost 1920 American silent comedy film starring Marguerite Clark and Harrison Ford. It was produced by Famous Players–Lasky and released through Paramount Pictures.

Easy to Get was filmed at Loon Lake, Adirondack Mountains.

== Plot ==
As described in a film magazine, Milly and Bob Morehouse board the train for their honeymoon immediately after the wedding ceremony. Bob meets an old friend in the smoking car. The old friend makes several well meant but poorly timed remarks concerning Bob's early successes with the fair sex which are overheard by the bride. Milly promptly drops off the train at a country crossroad and makes her way with difficulty and divers adventures to a nearby summer resort. Bob follows frantically, having numerous adventures of his own, until they reconcile and a happy ending results.

== Cast ==
- Marguerite Clark as Milly Morehouse
- Harrison Ford as Bob Morehouse
- Rod La Rocque as Dick Elliott (credited as Rodney LaRocque)
- Helen Greene as Pauline Reid
- Herbert Barrington as Talbot Chase
- Kid Broad as Thaddeus Burr
- H. Van Beusen as Jim Tucker
- Julia Hurley as Marm Tucker
- Walter Jones as Sheriff Len Philips
