= The Primitive Lover =

1922 film

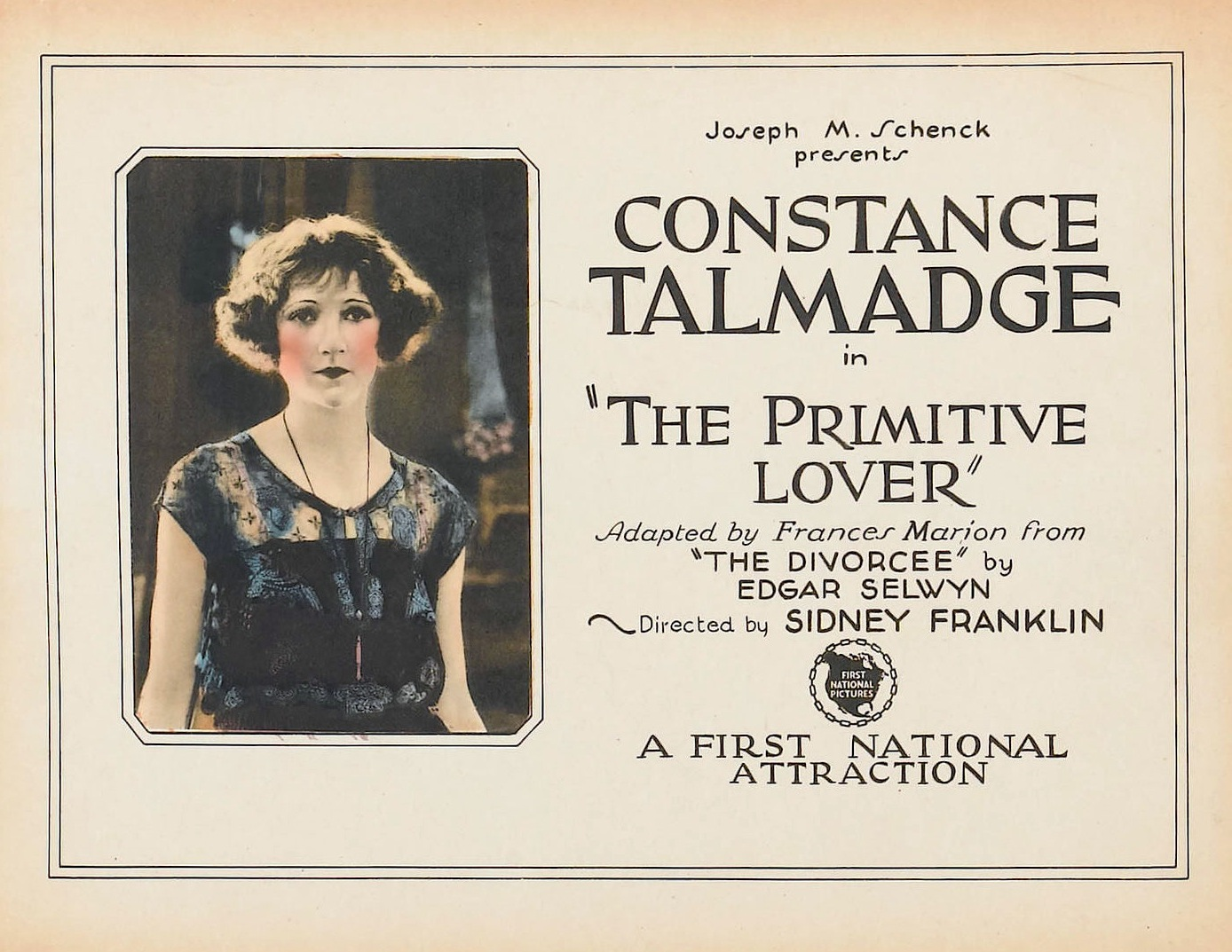
- Lobby card
- Directed by: Sidney Franklin
- Written by: Frances Marion (scenario)
- Based on: The Divorcee by Edgar Selwyn
- Produced by: Constance Talmadge
- Starring: Constance Talmadge; Harrison Ford
- Cinematography: David Abel
- Distributed by: Associated First National
- Release date: May 1, 1922
- Running time: 68 minutes; 7 reels
- Country: United States
- Language: Silent (English intertitles)

The Primitive Lover is a 1922 American silent drama film produced by and starring Constance Talmadge and distributed by Associated First National (later First National Pictures). Sidney A. Franklin served as the director of the movie and Frances Marion wrote the scenario based on a play, The Divorcee, by Edgar Selwyn. This film survives and has been released on DVD.

== Plot ==
The Primitive Lover (1922)

As described in a film magazine, Phyllis Tomley, a romance-stricken young woman, has grown tired of her prosaic, practical husband Hector and mourns the loss of the popular author Donald Wales, who supposedly died in South America.

Wales returns and rushes to Phyllis' arms, not knowing she has married Hector. Wales accuses Hector of taking advantage of his absence, and Phyllis rushes to get a divorce in Nevada. Hector follows and becomes acquainted with an attractive grass widow. Reading Wales' book The Primitive Lover, Hector decides to put its methods into practice. He kidnaps Phyllis and Wales and in a cabin in the mountains Phyllis sees how helpless Wales is.

From a Native American guide, Hector learns how to subdue an unruly wife, and he tries it on Phyllis with complete success. She apparently likes the rough treatment, and is happier still when the Nevada judge denies her requested divorce.

== Cast ==
- Constance Talmadge as Phyllis Tomley
- Harrison Ford as Hector Tomley
- Kenneth Harlan as Donald Wales
- Joe Roberts as 'Roaring' Bill Rivers
- Charles Pina as Indian Herder
- Chief John Big Tree as Indian Chief
- Mathilde Brundage as Mrs. Graham (credited as Mathilda Brundage)
- George C. Pearce as Judge Henseedsd
- Clyde Benson as Attorney
