= Happiness a la Mode =

1919 film by Walter Edwards

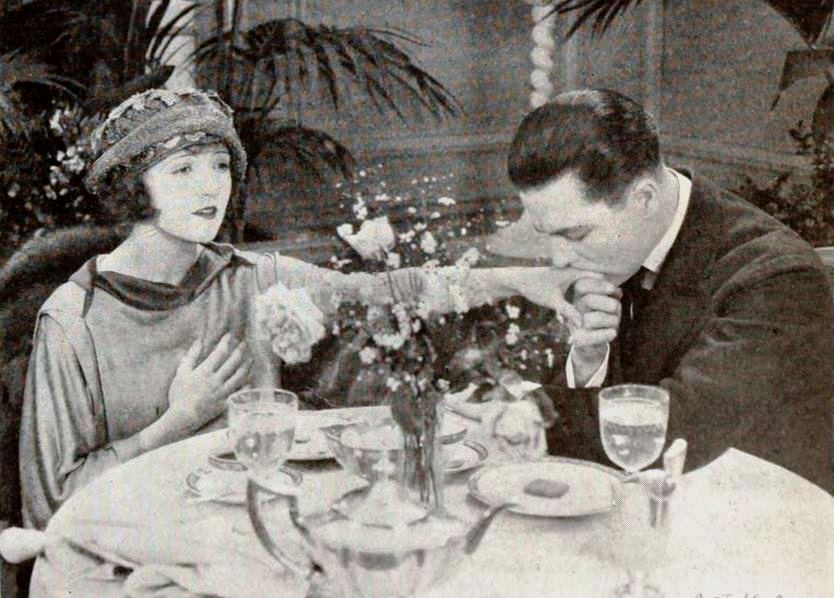
- Still with Constance Talmadge and Harrison Ford
- Directed by: Walter Edwards
- Written by: Alice Eyton; Edwina LeVin
- Produced by: Lewis J. Selznick
- Starring: Constance Talmadge; Harrison Ford
- Cinematography: James Van Trees
- Production company: Selznick Pictures
- Distributed by: Select Pictures
- Release date: June 15, 1919
- Running time: 50 minutes
- Country: United States
- Language: Silent (English intertitles)

Happiness a la Mode is a 1919 American silent romantic comedy film directed by Walter Edwards and starring Harrison Ford and Constance Talmadge.

== Plot ==
As described in a film magazine review, young husband Richard Townsend finds that he is tired of his wife Barbara and has become infatuated with another woman. Barbara consents to give him a divorce and then determines to win him back within the three months that must elapse prior to the final decree of divorce. By clever ruses she manages to accomplish her purpose and the conclusion finds the pair happily married.

== Cast ==
- Constance Talmadge as Barbara Townsend
- Harrison Ford as Richard Townsend
- Betty Schade as Dorothy Mitchell
- Myrtle Rishell as Eileen
- Paul Weigel as Attorney Logan
- Thomas Persse as Thompson
- Al Fremont as Greenburg

== Bibliography ==
- Jeanine Basinger. Silent Stars. Wesleyan University Press, 2000.
