= Constance Talmadge =

American actress (1898–1973)

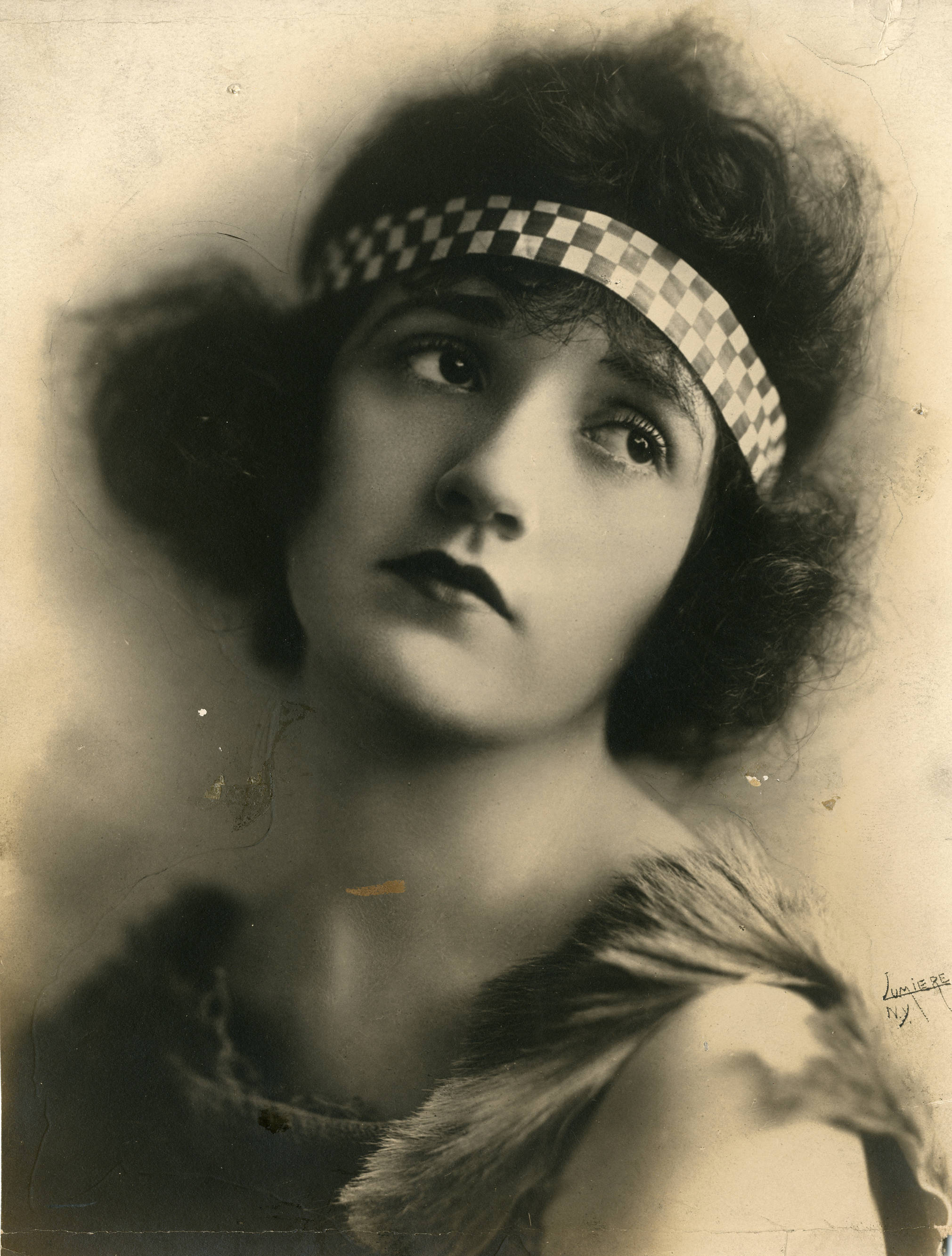
- Talmadge in 1919
- Born: Constance Alice Talmadge; April 19, 1898; Brooklyn, New York, U.S.
- Died: November 23, 1973 (aged 75); Los Angeles, California, U.S.
- Resting place: Hollywood Forever Cemetery
- Occupation: Actress
- Years active: 1914–1929
- Spouses: John Pialoglou (m. 1920; div. 1922) Alastair Mackintosh (m. 1926; div. 1927) Townsend Netcher (m. 1929; div. 1939) Walter Michael Giblin (m. 1939; died 1964)
- Relatives: Natalie Talmadge (sister); Norma Talmadge (sister)

Constance Alice Talmadge (April 19, 1898 – November 23, 1973) was an American silent film star. She was the sister of actresses Norma and Natalie Talmadge.

== Early life ==
Talmadge was born on April 19, 1898, in Brooklyn, New York, to poor parents, Margaret L. "Peg" and Frederick O. Talmadge. Her father was an alcoholic, and left them when she was still very young. Her mother made a living by doing laundry. When a friend recommended Talmadge's mother use older sister Norma as a model for title slides in flickers, which were shown in early nickelodeons, Peg decided to do so. This led all three sisters into acting careers.

== Career ==
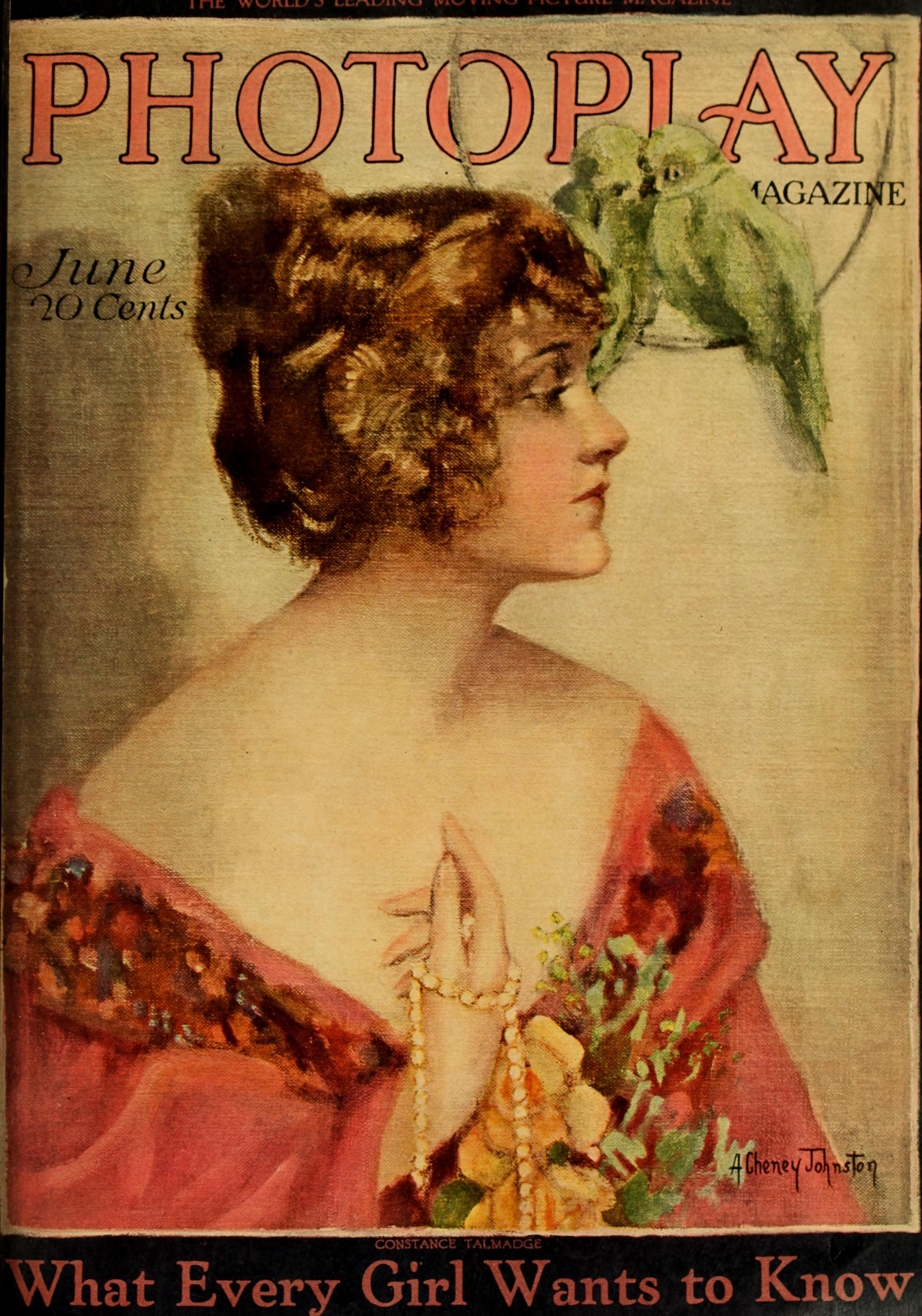
On the cover of Photoplay magazine, 1919

She began making films in 1914, in a Vitagraph comedy short, In Bridal Attire (1914). Her first major role was as the Mountain Girl and Marguerite de Navarre in D. W. Griffith's Intolerance (1916).

Griffith re-edited Intolerance repeatedly after its initial release, and even shot new scenes long after it was in distribution. Grace Kingsley found Talmadge in her dressing room at the Fine Arts Studio, in Los Angeles, in the midst of making up for some new shots.

"Did you really drive those galloping brutes of horses?" asked Kingsley.

"Indeed I did," said Talmadge. "Two women sat behind me at the Auditorium the other night. They said, 'Of course she never really drove those horses herself. Somebody doubled for her.' Know what I did? I turned around and told them, 'I wish I could show you my knees, all black and blue even yet from being cracked up against the dashboard of that chariot!'"

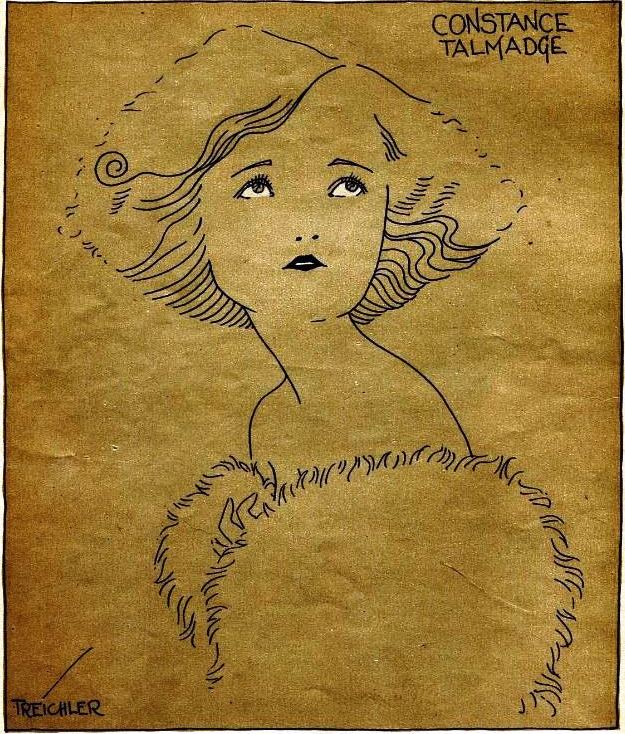
Drawing of actress Constance Talmadge by Treichler, page 40 of the December 1921 Screenland.

So popular was Talmadge's portrayal of the tomboyish Mountain Girl, Griffith released in 1919 the Babylonian sequence from Intolerance as a new, separate film called The Fall of Babylon. He refilmed her death scene to allow for a happy ending.

Her friend Anita Loos, who wrote many screenplays for her, appreciated her "humour and her irresponsible way of life". Over the course of her career, Talmadge appeared in more than 80 films, often in comedies such as A Pair of Silk Stockings (1918), Happiness a la Mode (1919), Romance and Arabella (1919), Wedding Bells (1921), and The Primitive Lover (1922).

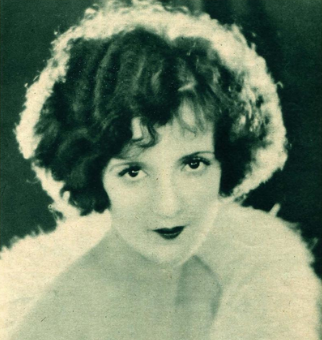
Constance Talmadge (1923)

Talmadge, along with her sisters, was heavily billed during her early career. According to her 1923 Blue Book of the Screen biography, she was "5'5" tall, 120 lbs, with blonde hair and brown eyes, ... an outdoor girl who loved activities."

When Talmadge was asked by a writer for Green Book magazine what sort of stories she wanted to do in 1920, she said:

Although no less than sixty manuscripts are submitted to me every week, it is exceedingly difficult to get exactly the kind of comedy I especially want. I want comedies of manners, comedies that are funny because they delight one’s sense of what is ridiculously human in the way of little everyday commonplace foibles and frailties – subtle comedies, not comedies of the slap stick variety.

I enjoy making people laugh. Secondly, because this type of work comes easiest and most naturally to me, I am not a highly emotional type. My sister could cry real tears over two sofa cushions stuffed into a long dress and white lace cap, to look like a dead baby, and she would do it so convincingly that 900 persons out front would weep with her. That is real art, but my kind of talent would lead me to bounce that padded baby up and down on my knee with absurd grimaces that would make the same 900 roar with laughter.

With the advent of talkies in 1929, Talmadge left Hollywood. Her sister Norma did make a handful of appearances in talking films, but for the most part the three sisters retired all together, investing in real estate and other business ventures. Only a few of her films survive today.

== Personal life ==
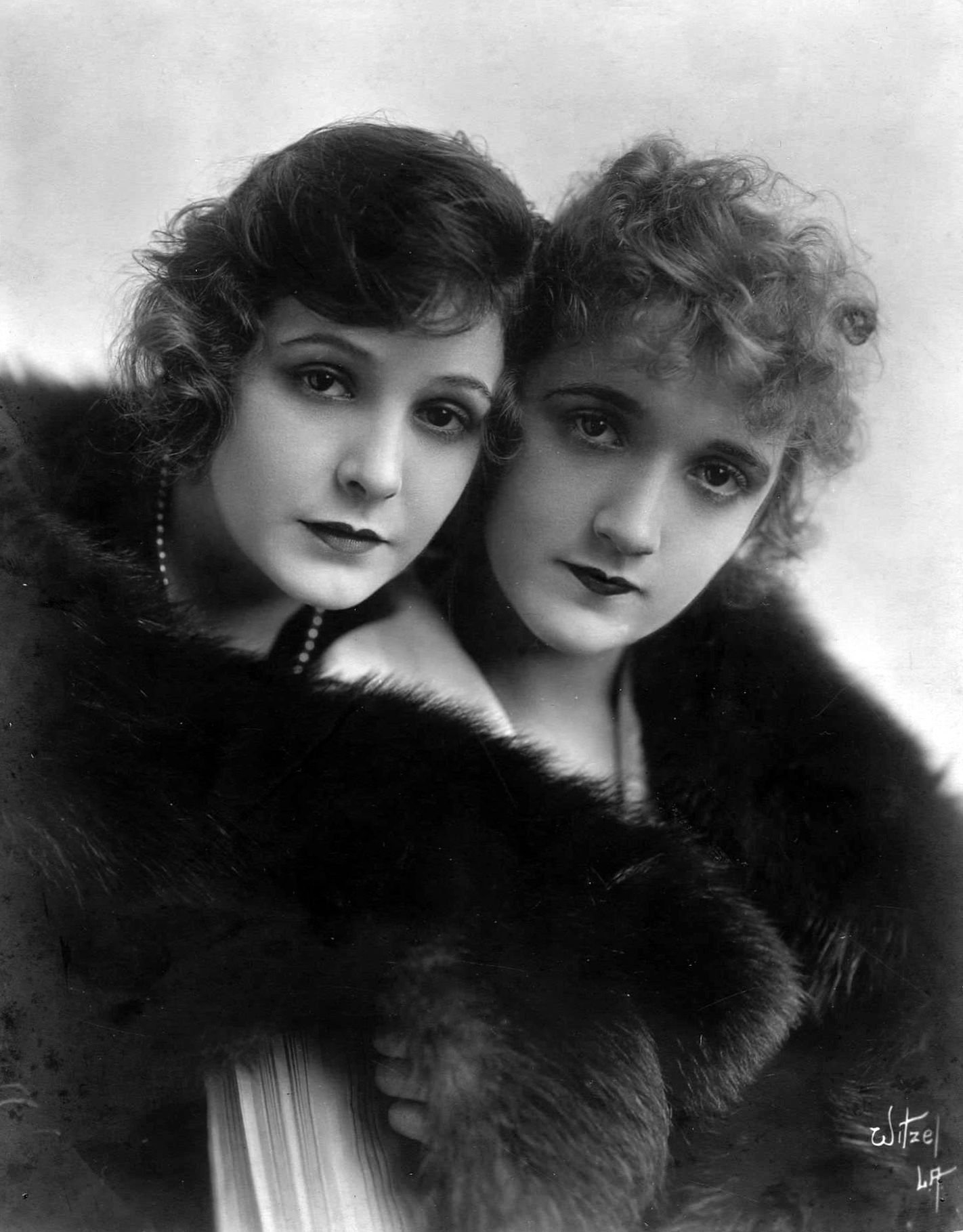
Norma and Constance Talmadge

She was married four times; all the unions were childless:

- Her first marriage, to John Pialoglou (1893–1959), a Greek tobacco importer, occurred in 1920 at a double wedding with Dorothy Gish and James Rennie; she divorced Pialoglou two years later. Her marriage to him, a Greek subject, caused her to lose her natural-born U.S. citizenship; following her divorce, she had to apply for U.S. naturalization.
- She married Scottish soldier Alastair William Mackintosh (grandfather of author Edward St Aubyn) in February 1926, divorcing him in 1927 on grounds of adultery.
- She married Townsend Netcher in May 1929, divorcing in 1939.
- She married Walter Michael Giblin in 1939. This marriage lasted until his death on May 1, 1964.

Talmadge's mother fostered the belief she might one day return to films. "Success and fame cast a spell that can never been quite shaken off", her mother said in her autobiography. "A woman, because of her love, may say, and in the fervor of the moment believe, that she is ready to give up her chosen work. But there is sure to come a time when keen longing and strong regret for her lost career dominate over the more placid contentments of love and marriage. Then unhappiness and friction ensue."

She died of pneumonia. Along with her sister Norma, Mary Pickford, and Douglas Fairbanks, Talmadge inaugurated the tradition of placing her footprints in concrete outside Grauman's Chinese Theatre. She left a trail of five footprints in her slab.

Her star on the Hollywood Walk of Fame is at 6300 Hollywood Blvd.

== Filmography ==
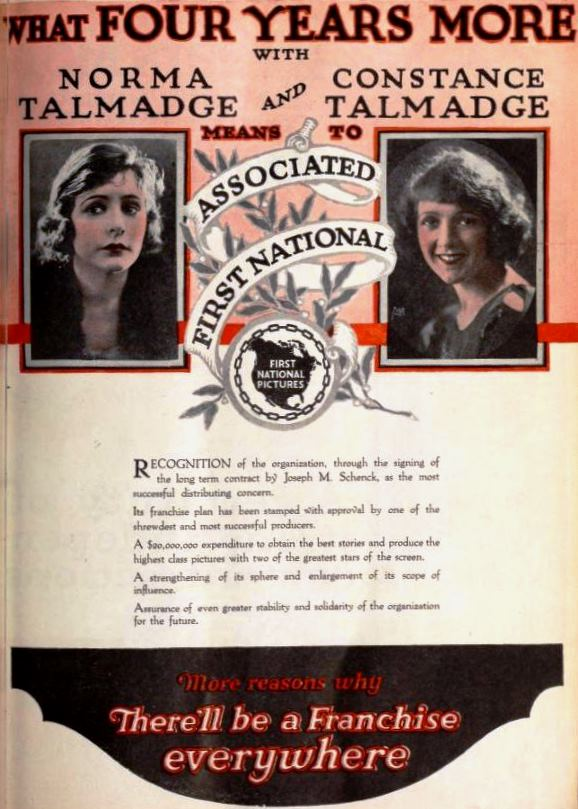
Advertisement promoting films with Norma Talmadge and Constance Talmadge, on page 9 of the December 25, 1920 Exhibitors Herald.

Short Subject
Year	Film	Role	Notes	Status
1914	Buddy's First Call	Grace Forster		
1914	The Maid from Sweden	Marie Cook		
1914	Our Fairy Play	Helen Payne - the Actress		
1914	The Moonstone of Fez	Winifred Osborne		
1914	Uncle Bill	Gladys		
1914	Buddy's Downfall	Lily - the City Flirt		
1914	The Mysterious Lodger	Lucy Lane		
1914	Father's Timepiece	Marjorie Stillwell		
1914	The Peacemaker	Kitty Grey		
1914	The Evolution of Percival	Mildred		
1914	In Bridal Attire	Mary		
1914	Fixing Their Dads	Florence		
1914	The Egyptian Mummy	Florence Hicks		
1914	Forcing Dad's Consent	Connie Boggs		
1915	In the Latin Quarter	Manon		Incomplete
1915	Billy's Wager	Connie		
1915	The Green Cat	Constance		
1915	The Young Man Who 'Figgered	Nan Tubbs		
1915	Burglarious Billy	Nellie		
1915	A Study in Tramps	Mary Stretch		
1915	The Master of His House	Mrs. Greene		
1915	The Lady of Shalott	Minor Role		
1915	The Boarding House Feud	Connie Drexel		
1915	The Vanishing Vault	Connie		
1915	Spades Are Trumps	Ella Cunningham		
1915	Bertie's Stratagem	Letty Grey		
1915	Insuring Cutey	Cutey's Bride		
1915	Billy the Bear Tamer	Constance		
1915	A Keyboard Strategy	Mrs. Walter Gibson		
1915	Can You Beat It?	Dill - Pike's Wife		
1915	Beached and Bleached			
1915	The Little Puritan	Corinne		
1916	The She-Devil			
1916	The Matrimaniac	Marna Lewis		Extant
Film
Year	Title	Role	Notes	Status
1915	Captivating Mary Carstairs	Bit Part	Uncredited	
1915	Georgia Pearce			
1916	The Missing Links	Laura Haskins		Lost
1916	Intolerance	Marguerite de Navarre / The Mountain Girl		Extant
1916	The Microscope Mystery	Jessie Barton		
1917	A Girl of the Timber Claims	Jessie West		
1917	Betsy's Burglar	Betsy Harlow		Lost
1917	The Lesson	Helen Drayton		
1917	Scandal	Beatrix Vanderdyke		
1917	The Honeymoon	Helen Drayton		Lost
1918	The Studio Girl	Celia Laird		
1918	The Shuttle	Bettina Vandepoel		
1918	Up the Road with Sallie	Sallie Waters		Extant
1918	Good Night, Paul	Mrs. Richard		Extant
1918	A Pair of Silk Stockings	Mrs. Molly Thornhill		Extant
1918	Sauce for the Goose	Kitty Constable		Unknown
1918	Mrs. Leffingwell's Boots	Mrs. Leffingwell		Unknown
1918	A Lady's Name	Mabel Vere		Incomplete
1919	Who Cares?	Joan Ludlow		Lost
1919	Romance and Arabella	Arabella Cadenhouse		Lost
1919	Experimental Marriage	Suzanne Ercoll		Unknown
1919	The Veiled Adventure	Geraldine Barker		Extant
1919	Happiness a la Mode	Barbara Townsend		Unknown
1919	A Temperamental Wife	Billie Billings		Extant
1919	A Virtuous Vamp	Gwendolyn Armitage / Nellie Jones	Also produced	Extant
1920	Two Weeks	Lillums Blair		Extant
1920	In Search of a Sinner	Georgianna Chadbourne		Unknown
1920	The Love Expert	Babs	Also produced	Extant
1920	The Perfect Woman	Mary Blake		Extant
1920	Good References	Mary Wayne		Extant
1920	Dangerous Business	Nancy Flavelle		Lost
1921	Mama's Affair	Eve Orrin		Extant
1921	Lessons in Love	Leila Calthorpe		Extant
1921	Wedding Bells	Rosalie Wayne		Lost
1921	Woman's Place	Josephine Gerson		Extant
1922	Polly of the Follies	Polly Meacham	Also produced	Lost
1922	The Primitive Lover	Phyllis Tomley	Also produced	Extant
1922	East Is West	Ming Toy	Also produced	Extant
1923	Dulcy	Dulcy		Lost
1923	The Dangerous Maid	Barbara Winslow		Extant
1924	The Goldfish	Jennie Wetherby		Incomplete
1924	Her Night of Romance	Dorothy Adams	Also produced	Extant
1924	In Hollywood with Potash and Perlmutter	Herself		Lost
1925	Learning to Love	Patricia Stanhope		Incomplete
1925	Seven Chances	Girl in Car	Uncredited	Extant
1925	Her Sister from Paris	Helen Weyringer / La Perry		Extant
1926	The Duchess of Buffalo	Marian Duncan	Also produced	Extant
1927	Venus of Venice	Carlotta	Also produced	Incomplete
1927	Breakfast at Sunrise	Madeleine	Also produced	Extant
1929	Venus	Princess Beatrice Doriani		Unknown
