= Sauce for the Goose =

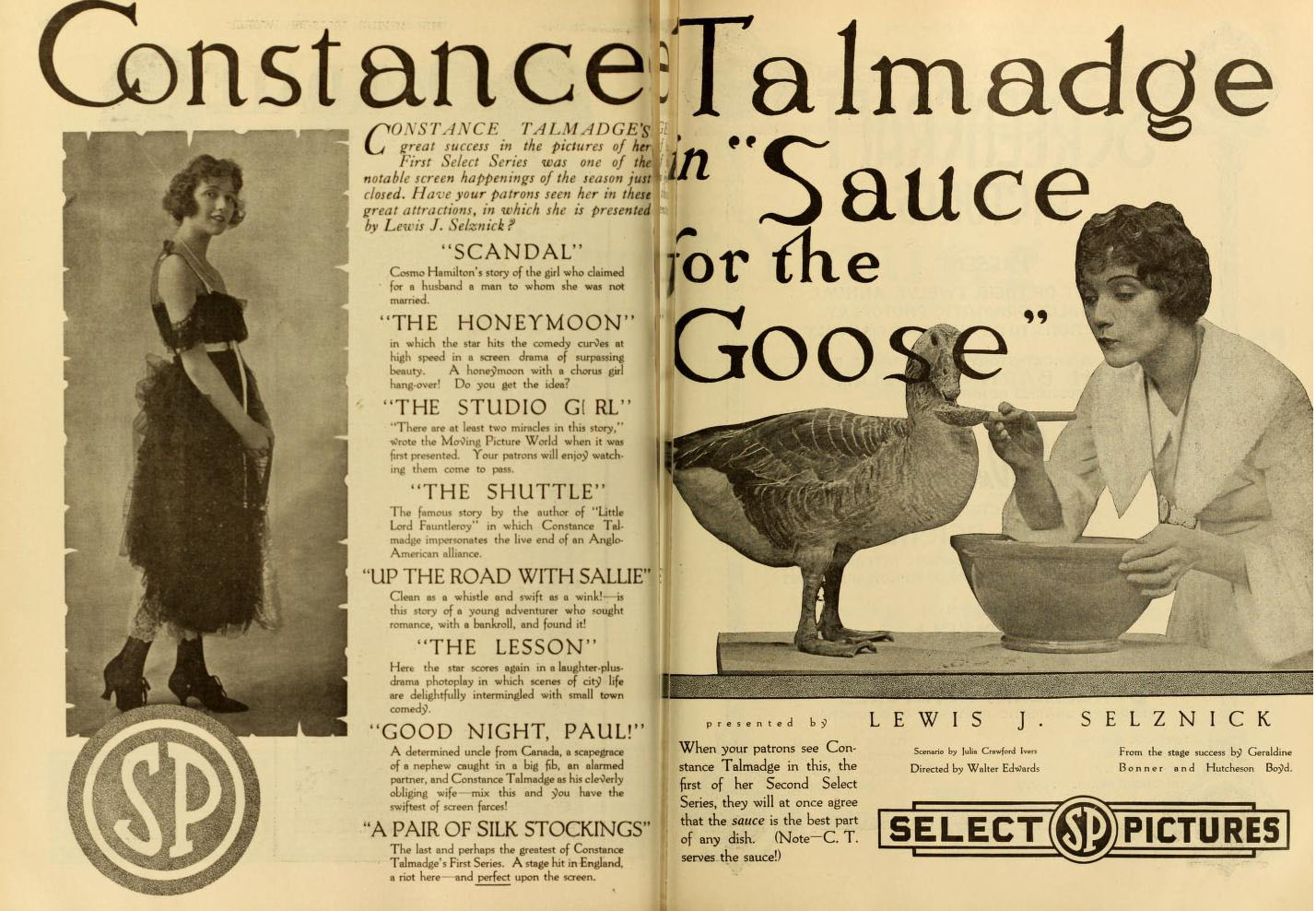
- Directed by: Walter Edwards
- Written by: Julia Crawford Ivers
- Based on: Sauce for the Goose by Geraldine Bonner and Hutcheson Boyd
- Produced by: Lewis J. Selznick
- Starring: Constance Talmadge; Harrison Ford; Vera Doria
- Cinematography: James Van Trees
- Production company: Select Pictures
- Distributed by: Select Pictures
- Release date: August 10, 1918
- Running time: 50 minutes
- Country: United States
- Languages: Silent; English intertitles

Sauce for the Goose is a 1918 American silent comedy film directed by Walter Edwards and starring Constance Talmadge, Harrison Ford, and Vera Doria.

== Cast ==
- Constance Talmadge as Kitty Constable
- Harrison Ford as John Constable
- Vera Doria as Mrs. Margaret Alloway
- Harland Tucker as Harry Travers
- Edna Mae Cooper as Mrs. Edith Darch
- Louis Willoughby as Teddy Sylvester
- Jane Keckley as Maid

== Bibliography ==
- Jeanine Basinger. Silent Stars. Wesleyan University Press, 2000.
