= A Pair of Silk Stockings (film) =

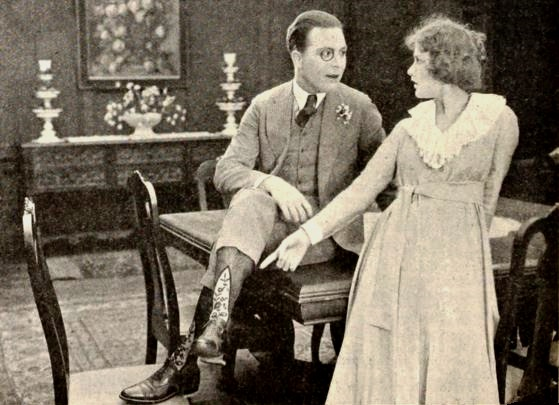
- Film still
- Directed by: Walter Edwards
- Written by: Edith Kennedy (scenario)
- Based on: A Pair of Silk Stockings by Cyril Harcourt
- Produced by: Lewis J. Selznick
- Starring: Constance Talmadge; Harrison Ford
- Cinematography: James Van Trees
- Distributed by: Select Pictures
- Release date: July 20, 1918
- Running time: 60 minutes; 5 reels
- Country: United States
- Language: Silent (English intertitles)

A Pair of Silk Stockings is a 1918 American silent marital comedy film starring Constance Talmadge and Harrison Ford. It was directed by Walter Edwards and produced and distributed by Select Pictures. The film is based on a 1914 Broadway play of the same name, and not related to the Kate Chopin short story "A Pair of Silk Stockings".

== Plot ==
As described in a film magazine, Molly Thornhill and her husband Sam disagree about automobiles and almost everything else. She buys a roadster while he prefers a touring car, and to retaliate he buys a cloak for an actress and leaves the bill where Molly finds it. She gets a divorce and later they are both guests at a house party. Sam hides in her room so that he can explain things to her, but is mistaken for a burglar by the young man of the house and is bound and gagged with silk stockings by the man and Molly. Sam escapes while they are attempting to explain their presence together, and because they cannot produce the burglar Molly is asked to leave. She refuses until a burglar has been found. Sam is discovered wearing the silk stockings and Molly's reputation is saved when Sam confesses his part in the midnight escapade.

== Cast ==
- Constance Talmadge as Mrs. Molly Thornhill
- Harrison Ford as Sam Thornhill
- Wanda Hawley as Pamela Bristowe
- Vera Doria as Irene Maitland
- Florence Carpenter as Maudie Plantaganet
- Thomas Persse as Sir John Gower
- Louis Willoughby as Captain Jack Bagnal
- Helen Haskell as Angela
- Larry Steers as McIntyre (billed as L. W. Steers)
- Robert Gordon as Brook
- Sylvia Ashton as Lady Gower
