= Walter Edwards (director) =

American director, screenwriter and actor

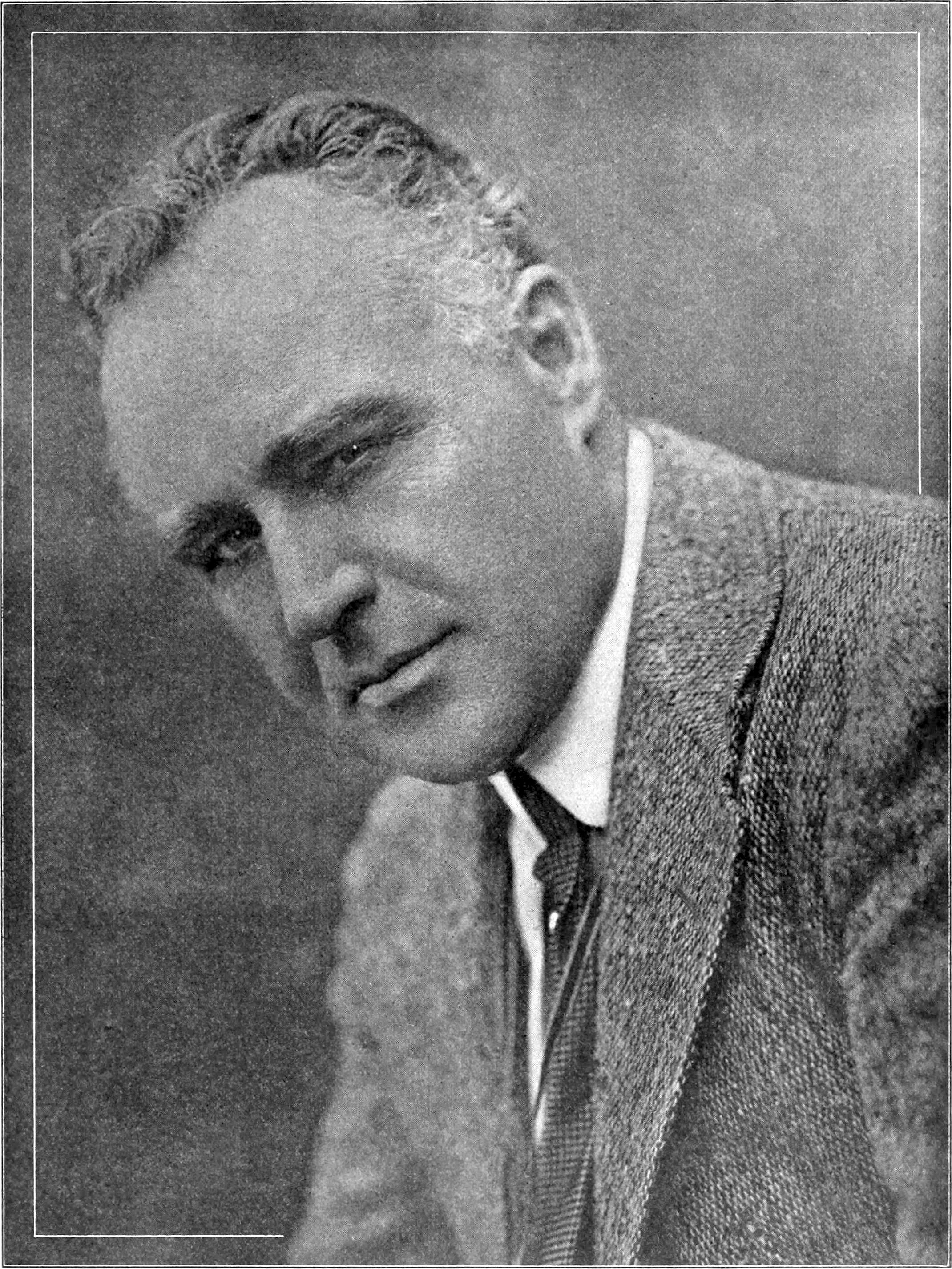
- Walter Edwards (1917)
- Born: January 8, 1870; Michigan
- Died: April 12, 1920 (aged 50); Honolulu
- Occupations: Director, Screenwriter, Actor

Walter Edwards (January 8, 1870 – April 12, 1920), was an American director, screenwriter and actor. He directed 46 films during his career.

Edwards initially worked at the Elitch Theatre as a director in 1896, but he later returned for multiple seasons as an actor in the summer stock cast. "In 1896, Mrs. Elitch signed J. H. Huntley to direct a resident stock company... After six weeks of melodrama, however, and a few unsatisfactory notices, the organization of the company was changed. Huntley, who was not very popular with audiences or with newspaper reviewers, was replaced by Walter Edwards." On July 12, 1896, Edwards started as director and his first play was J. K. Tillotson's A Gilded Crime. The newspaper review stated: "Walter Edwards' presence has strengthened the company materially..."

Between 1897 and 1908 Edwards was a regular of the Elitch Theatre summer stock cast. Commenting on his leading roles in 1898, Mary Elitch remembered, "Walter Edwards headed a very strong company when the 1898 season opened with Mrs. Frances Hodgson Burnett's Esmeralda. His leading lady was Margaret Dibdin." Later, in 1912, Edwards returned to the Elitch Theatre and was the lead in The Deep Purple by Wilson Mizner and Paul Armstrong.

== Selected filmography ==
- The Harvest of Sin (1913)
- The Edge of the Abyss (1915)
- The Bride of Hate (1917)
- The Last of the Ingrams (1917)
- Love or Justice (1917)
- Idolators (1917)
- The Fuel of Life (1917)
- Time Locks and Diamonds (1917)
- Paddy O'Hara (1917)
- Mrs. Leffingwell's Boots (1918)
- A Pair of Silk Stockings (1918)
- A Lady's Name (1918)
- Sauce for the Goose (1918)
- The Man from Funeral Range (1918)
- The Gypsy Trail (1918)
- Who Cares? (1919)
- Girls (1919)
- The Veiled Adventure (1919)
- Romance and Arabella (1919)
- Widow by Proxy (1919)
- Happiness a la Mode (1919)
- A Girl Named Mary (1919)
- All of a Sudden Peggy (1920)
- Young Mrs. Winthrop (1920)
- Easy to Get (1920)
- A Lady in Love (1920)
