= James Van Trees =

American cinematographer

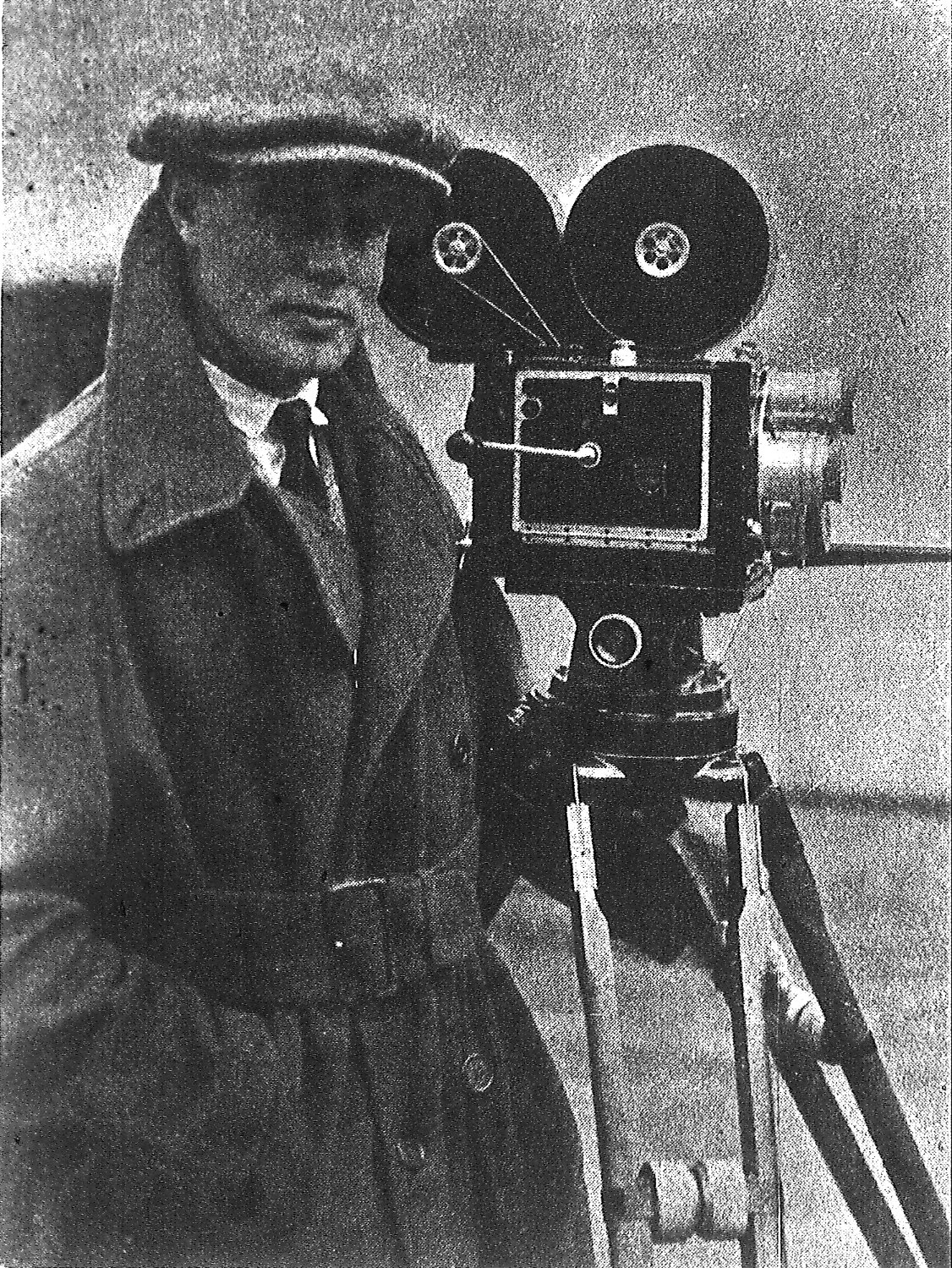
- Born: August 13, 1890
- Died: April 11, 1973 (aged 82); Los Angeles, California
- Occupation: Cinematographer
- Years active: 1915–1973
- Parent: Julia Crawford Ivers (mother)

James Crawford Van Trees (August 13, 1890 – April 11, 1973) was an American cinematographer in Hollywood whose career spanned the silent and sound eras.

== Biography ==
His father was Franklin S. Van Trees (1866-1914), a society architect, best known for his mansions in the Pacific Heights area of San Francisco, such as the Baron Edward S. Rothschild house on Jackson Street. His mother was silent era scriptwriter Julia Crawford Ivers. Mother and son worked together on a few films more than likely becoming the first mother and son to direct and film productions.

Van Trees was the President of the American Society of Cinematographers (ASC) during 1923–1924. His son James Van Trees, Jr. was a cameraman and worked for Metro-Goldwyn-Mayer with his father.

== Partial filmography ==
- The Wild Olive (1915)
- The Code of Marcia Gray (1916)
- David Garrick (1916)
- The Shuttle (1918)
- Sauce for the Goose (1918)
- Mrs. Leffingwell's Boots (1918)
- Widow by Proxy (1919)
- Happiness a la Mode (1919)
- The Thirteenth Commandment (1920)
- Judy of Rogue's Harbor (1920)
- Jenny Be Good (1920)
- The Furnace (1920)
- Sacred and Profane Love (1921)
- Wealth (1921)
- The Young Rajah (1922)
- The White Flower (1923)
- Lilies of the Field (1924)
- Single Wives (1924)
- Fifth Avenue (1926)
- The Prince of Pilsen (1926)
- Don Juan's Three Nights (1926)
- Midnight Lovers (1926)
- The Prince of Headwaiters (1927)
- The Noose (1928)
- Sinner's Parade (1928)
- The Whip (1928)
- The Lone Wolf's Daughter (1929)
- So Long Letty (1929)
- The Sacred Flame (1929)
- The Green Goddess (1930)
- The Man from Blankley's (1930)
- Viennese Nights (1930)
- Star Witness (1931)
- The Heart of New York (1932)
- Heroes for Sale (1933)
- Midnight Mary (1933)
- Baby Face (1933)
- The Girl from 10th Avenue (1935)
- The Bishop Misbehaves (1935)
- Shanghai (1935)
- Palm Springs (1936)
- Her Master's Voice (1936)
- The Gorilla Man (1943)
- Nine Girls (1944)
