= Anna Sergejeva =

Ukrainian-Estonian actress (born 1986)

- Sergejeva at the President of Estonia's Independence Restoration Day reception in 2026
- Born: 13 January 1986 (age 40); Kyiv, Ukrainian SSR, Soviet Union
- Occupation: Actress
- Years active: 2011–present

Anna Sergejeva (born 13 January 1986) is a Ukrainian-born Estonian actress. She has been a member of the company of Tallinn's Südalinna Theatre (formerly the Russian Theatre of Estonia) since 2015.

== Early life and education ==
Sergejeva was born in Kyiv and moved with her family to Estonia when she was two months old.

She graduated from Tallinn Läänemere Gymnasium in 2005 and received a master's degree from the Kyiv National I. K. Karpenko-Kary Theatre, Cinema and Television University in 2012.

== Career ==
From 2011 to 2015, Sergejeva worked at the Pechersk New Theatre in Kyiv. In 2015, she joined the Russian Theatre of Estonia in Tallinn, later renamed Südalinna Theatre.

Her stage roles in Tallinn have included Cecily Cardew in Oscar Wilde's The Importance of Being Earnest (2016), Katerina Ivanovna Marmeladova in an adaptation of Fyodor Dostoevsky's Crime and Punishment (2017), Annette Reille in Yasmina Reza's God of Carnage (2018), Mrs Pearce in My Fair Lady (2020), Margarita in an adaptation of Mikhail Bulgakov's The Master and Margarita (2021), and Manilova in an adaptation of Nikolai Gogol's Dead Souls (2022).

Sergejeva has also appeared in Estonian film and television. She played Galina in Moonika Siimets's 2018 film The Little Comrade and appeared in René Vilbre's 2021 film Eesti matus (Estonian Funeral).

In 2019, she joined the long-running Eesti Televisioon (ETV) television series Õnne 13, playing Maria. She later appeared in the bilingual ETV+ television series Vaga vesi (2021) as a French teacher.

== Selected filmography ==
Year	Title	Role	Notes
2016–2018	Kättemaksukontor	Alina Tepko / Emma Haalen	Television series (six episodes)
2018	The Little Comrade	Galina	Film
2019–present	Õnne 13	Maria	Television series
2021	Eesti matus (Estonian Funeral)	Tiina	Film
2021	Vaga vesi	French teacher	Television series

== Personal life ==
Sergejeva was in a long-term relationship with actor Viktor Marvin after the two met when they both applied to drama school in Kyiv. They were later married for ten years. The couple has two daughters. Sergejeva and Marvin separated in 2024 and divorced in 2025.
