= Laughing at Danger =

Laughing at Danger may refer to:

- Laughing at Danger (1940 film), an American crime film
- Laughing at Danger (1924 film), an American silent action film
