= Geraldine Bonner =

American author

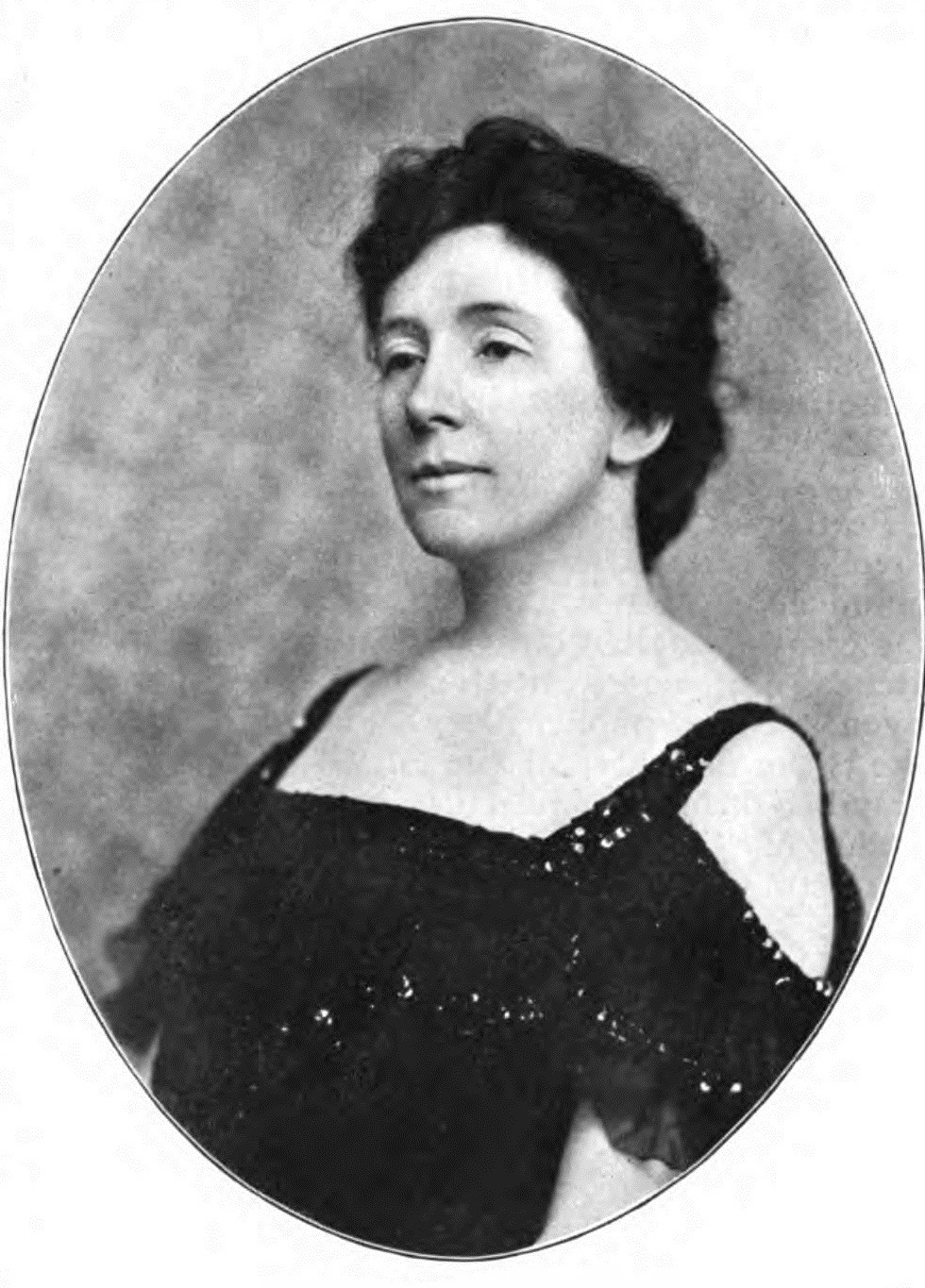
- Geraldine Bonner
- Born: 1870; Staten Island, New York, United States
- Died: June 17, 1930 (aged 59–60); New York, New York, United States
- Occupations: journalist, novelist, playwright

Geraldine Bonner (1870– June 17, 1930) was an American journalist, short story writer, novelist, and playwright. Her fiction included mysteries and stories of working women, San Francisco society, and the mining West. Contemporary bibliographic sources identified Hard Pan as a pseudonym that Bonner sometimes used.

== Early life and education ==
Geraldine Bonner was born in 1870 on Staten Island, New York, to John and Mary (Sewell) Bonner, who were of Moravian heritage. John Bonner was an editor at the New York Times and Harper's Weekly.

At the age of 10, Bonner's parents took her west. They lived in Kansas City and then spent two years in mining camps in Colorado where her father worked as a prospector. According to Bonner, her father felt that schools stifled creativity so he did not allow her to attend. Instead, he personally supervised her education. In 1883, the family moved to San Francisco and John Bonner became editor of a local newspaper called The Argonaut.

When she was 16, Bonner published a story called In Favilla: A Phantasmagoria in the May 1886 issue of the Overland Monthly magazine. An early work of science fiction, In Favilla is an apocalyptic vision of earth after it is hit by a comet. Bonner took her inspiration for the story from Robert Duncan Milne’s Into the Sun, which she had read years earlier.

== Career ==
In 1887, at the age of 17, Bonner began writing for The Argonaut. She served as drama critic and later foreign correspondent for the paper for the next several years. She also wrote for another San Francisco newspaper called The Wave. A contemporary source called The Wave the "Cradle of the Modern Californianistic School of Fiction." In addition to Bonner, the newspaper published writers such as Gelett Burgess, Frank Norris, Juliet Wilbor Tompkins, Hubert Henry Davies, Will Irwin, and James Hopper. Bonner's short stories also appeared in magazines during this time. Harper's Weekly and Harper's Monthly published In the Haworth (1890) and A Royal Marriage (1894). Other magazines where her stories appeared include Collier's Weekly and Lippincott's.

=== Novels ===
Bonner published her first novel in 1900. Called Hard-Pan: A Story of Bonanza Fortunes, the book was advertised as a satire of San Francisco high society. San Francisco served as the setting for several of her next novels. Tomorrow's Tangle (1903), The Pioneer: A Tale of Two States (1905), Rich Men's Children (1906), and Treasure and Trouble Therewith: A Novel of California (1917) all highlighted the city. Treasure and Trouble Therewith is also notable for featuring Fong, a Chinese character who assumes a detective role, using a network of Chinese informants to help solve the central mystery.

Her serial The Girl at Central: Her Own Story of the Great Hesketh Mystery was published in the Ladies' Home Journal (1914-15). The mystery, later released as a book, was an example of Bonner's working-girl fiction. The story followed a plucky telephone operator as she helps solve a high-society mystery.

=== Plays ===
Bonner and Elmer Blaney Harris frequented the artists' colony that had been established in Monterey and Carmel-by-the-Sea. In 1908, they co-wrote the play Sham. Sham was performed at Wallack's Theatre in New York in 1909 and had a run of 65 performances. The play was a romantic comedy, and a contemporary review observed that the plot showed little innovation but the dialogue was clever. In 1921, Sham was made into a silent movie.

Bonner next collaborated with playwright and author Hutcheson Boyd to write Sauce for the Goose in 1909. A comedy about a love triangle, contemporary reviews found the plot uninspired but the dialogue witty. It opened at New York's newly established Playhouse Theatre in 1911. In 1912, Bonner collaborated with Boyd again on Making a Man of Him. Another comedy, the plot focused on a sister's devotion to her brother although he had betrayed her trust. Bonner and Boyd teamed up a third time to write the 1914 play Lady Eileen. This script won a $1,000 prize offered by Oliver Morosco for the best play written by American authors. In addition, Bonner and Boyd receved a bonus of $1,000 plus $1,500 in advance royalties for American and foreign rights to the play.

== Death ==
Bonner died on June 17, 1930, in New York City. She is buried in the Moravian Cemetery on Staten Island, New York.

== Selected works ==
=== Novels ===
- Hard-Pan: A Story of Bonanza Fortunes (1900)
- Tomorrow's Tangle (1903)
- The Pioneer: A Tale of Two States (1905)
- The Castlecourt Diamond Case (1906)
- Rich Men's Children (1906)
- The Emigrant Trail (1910)
- The Book of Evelyn (1913)
- The Girl at Central (1915)
- The Black Eagle Mystery (1916)
- Treasure and Trouble Therewith: A Tale of California (1917)
- Miss Maitland, Private Secretary (1919)
- The Leading Lady (1926)
- Taken at the Flood: A Story in Four Parts (1927)

=== Plays ===
- Sham (1908)
- Sauce for the Goose (1909)
- Making a Man of Him (1912)
- Lady Eileen (1914)
