= Misbehaving Ladies =

1931 film

- Directed by: William Beaudine
- Written by: Julien Josephson
- Based on: Once There Was a Princess by Juliet Wilbor Tompkins
- Starring: Lila Lee; Ben Lyon; Louise Fazenda; Lucien Littlefield
- Cinematography: John F. Seitz
- Edited by: Terry O. Morse
- Music by: Cecil Copping (uncredited); Erno Rapee; Leo Forbstein
- Production company: Warner Bros. Pictures
- Distributed by: Warner Bros. Pictures
- Release date: April 18, 1931
- Running time: 65 minutes
- Country: United States
- Language: English

Misbehaving Ladies (also known as The Queen of Main Street) is a 1931 American Pre-Code comedy film directed by William Beaudine and starring Lila Lee, Ben Lyon and Louise Fazenda. It is based on the 1926 short story Once There Was a Princess by Juliet Wilbor Tompkins.

== Cast ==
- Lila Lee as Princess Ellen
- Ben Lyon as Phil Hunter
- Louise Fazenda as Aunt Kate Boyd
- Lucien Littlefield as Uncle Joe Boyd
- Julia Swayne Gordon as Princess Delatorre
- Emily Fitzroy as Meta Oliver
- Martha Mattox as Mrs. Twitchell
- Virginia Grey as Hazel Boyd
- Oscar Apfel as Mayor Twitchell

== Preservation status ==
The film is preserved in the Library of Congress collection.
