= Piccadilly Jim (2004 film) =

- Directed by: John McKay
- Screenplay by: Julian Fellowes
- Based on: Piccadilly Jim; 1917 novel by P. G. Wodehouse
- Starring: Sam Rockwell; Frances O'Connor
- Cinematography: Andrew Dunn
- Edited by: David Freeman
- Music by: Adrian Johnston
- Production companies: Myriad Pictures; Isle of Man Film; Mission Pictures
- Distributed by: Myriad Pictures
- Release date: November 2004
- Running time: 97 minutes
- Country: United Kingdom
- Language: English

Piccadilly Jim is a romantic comedy film directed by John McKay, starring Sam Rockwell and Frances O'Connor. It is based on the 1917 comic novel Piccadilly Jim by P. G. Wodehouse. The film was shot in 2004, shown at the 2005 Tribeca Film Festival, and released in the UK in 2006. The novel on which the film was based was also adapted into a 1919 film and a 1936 film.

== Cast ==
- Sam Rockwell as Jim Crocker
- Frances O'Connor as Ann Chester
- Tom Wilkinson as Bingley Crocker
- Brenda Blethyn as Nesta Pett
- Hugh Bonneville as Lord Wisbeach
- Allison Janney as Eugenia Crocker
- Austin Pendleton as Peter Pett
- Tom Hollander as Willie Partridge
- Geoffrey Palmer as Bayliss
- Pam Ferris as Miss Trimble
- Rupert Simonian as Ogden Ford
- Sia as New York Bar Singer

== Production ==
Kirk D'Amico, Marion Pilowsky, and Steve Christian were executive producers. Peter Czernin, Graham Broadbent, and Andrew Hauptman were producers. The director was John McKay and the screenwriter was Julian Fellowes.

== Reception ==
Ronnie Scheib, Variety: "Piccadilly Jim is a dizzy drawing room comedy with as many madcap entrances and exits as a French bedroom farce. Costumed and festooned to a faretheewell, [it] lavishes more attention on its eclectic mix of decor than its uneven ensemble of actors. … Production designer Amanda McArthur’s and costume designer Ralph Hole’s innovative meld of ’30s, ’50s and ’70s styles gives [the film] a jazzy freewheeling feel, further enhanced by Adrian Johnston’s era-sampling score. But in his haste to liberate his period reconstruction from any “Masterpiece Theatre”-type historical handcuffs, helmer John McKay also frees it from the discipline of pinpoint comic timing and the exercise of spirited, lively exchange."

Chris Barsanti, Contactmusic.com: "A rather hysterical oddity that can't decide what era it's set in or what mood to play, Piccadilly Jim just chucks it all at the screen and hopes that some wit will come through and generate some laughs. … Careening from full-throttle farce to light-hearted badinage to earnest romance, there's no unified tone, and with the addition of pointless anachronisms (although the general look is the 1930s, there are some additions like modern automobiles and torch singers belting out new wave tunes) it just seems like a big old mess. In the midst of all this atonal turmoil, a good number of cast members are doing their game best to have a good time, and it shows."

John Ralske, AllMovie: "Rockwell can't always save a film, but he's always fun to watch, and for the most part, Piccadilly Jim is engaging when he's onscreen. Director John McKay tries to capture a kind of anarchic spirit that he finds in P.G. Wodehouse's work, as opposed to sticking strictly to the text, so anachronisms abound, most notably in the set design, the music, and the mismatched style of the performances. … McKay is aiming for something freewheeling and loose-limbed, but Piccadilly Jim never quite comes together. It's mildly entertaining -- cute even -- but it's also kind of a mess."

Brian Taves, in his book P. G. Wodehouse and Hollywood, was critical of the film. Taves argued that, in attempting to modernize the story, the film lost much of the subtle, light-hearted humour that was present in Wodehouse's original novel and its 1936 film adaptation. Taves noted as an example that, whereas Jim's insouciance is shown in the 1936 film when the butler Bayliss finds Jim asleep after a late night with his feet on the pillow where his head should be, the 2004 film has Bayliss find Jim in bed with three scantily clad women. Taves further argued that the film presented Jim as a true wastrel and womanizer who is incapable of remorse, whereas Jim is a more remorseful and sympathetic character in the original novel. Taves also felt that the use of songs, costumes, and automobiles from various time periods created a lack of internal coherence. However, Taves was more positive about the portrayals of some of the film's supporting characters, particularly of Tom Wilkinson's portrayal of Bingley Crocker.
