= Night Patrol =

Night Patrol may refer to:

- Night Patrol (1984 film), a comedy film directed by Jackie Kong
- Night Patrol (2025 film), a horror-thriller film directed by Ryan Prows

== See also ==
- The Night Patrol, a silent crime film directed by Noel M. Smith
