= Little Comrade =

1919 film by Chester Withey

- Directed by: Chester Withey
- Screenplay by: Alice Eyton; Juliet Wilbor Tompkins
- Produced by: Jesse L. Lasky
- Starring: Vivian Martin; Niles Welch; Gertrude Claire; Richard Henry Cummings; Larry Steers; Elinor Hancock
- Cinematography: Frank E. Garbutt
- Production company: Famous Players–Lasky Corporation
- Distributed by: Paramount Pictures
- Release date: March 30, 1919
- Running time: 50 minutes
- Country: United States
- Language: Silent (English intertitles)

Little Comrade is a lost 1919 American silent comedy film directed by Chester Withey and written by Alice Eyton and Juliet Wilbor Tompkins. The film stars Vivian Martin, Niles Welch, Gertrude Claire, Richard Henry Cummings, Larry Steers, and Elinor Hancock. The film was released on March 30, 1919, by Paramount Pictures.

== Plot ==
As described in a film magazine, Genevieve Rutherford Hale, pampered daughter of wealthy parents, decides to become a farmerette to help win the war. She arrives at the Hubbard farm in her limousine and goes to work with a group of other young women. Bob Hubbard, the youngest son of farmer Hubbard, falls in love with Genevieve, and when he enters an army training camp life becomes so distasteful that he goes AWOL and returns home. Genevieve persuades him to return to camp, but they are discovered together and the elder Hubbard sends the young woman away. Bob obtains a leave of absence and goes home to explain things to explain things to his father, and Genevieve's name is cleared in the eyes of the farmer and farmerettes. Bob becomes a good soldier and determines to marry Genevieve when the war is over.

== Cast ==
- Vivian Martin as Genevieve Rutherford Hale
- Niles Welch as Bobbie Hubbard
- Gertrude Claire as Mrs. Hubbard
- Richard Henry Cummings as Mr. Hubbard
- Larry Steers as Lieutenant Richard Hubbard
- Elinor Hancock as Mrs. Hale
- Nancy Chase as Isabel Hale
- Pearl Lovici as Bertha Bicknell
