= Richard Talmadge =

German–American actor (1892–1981)

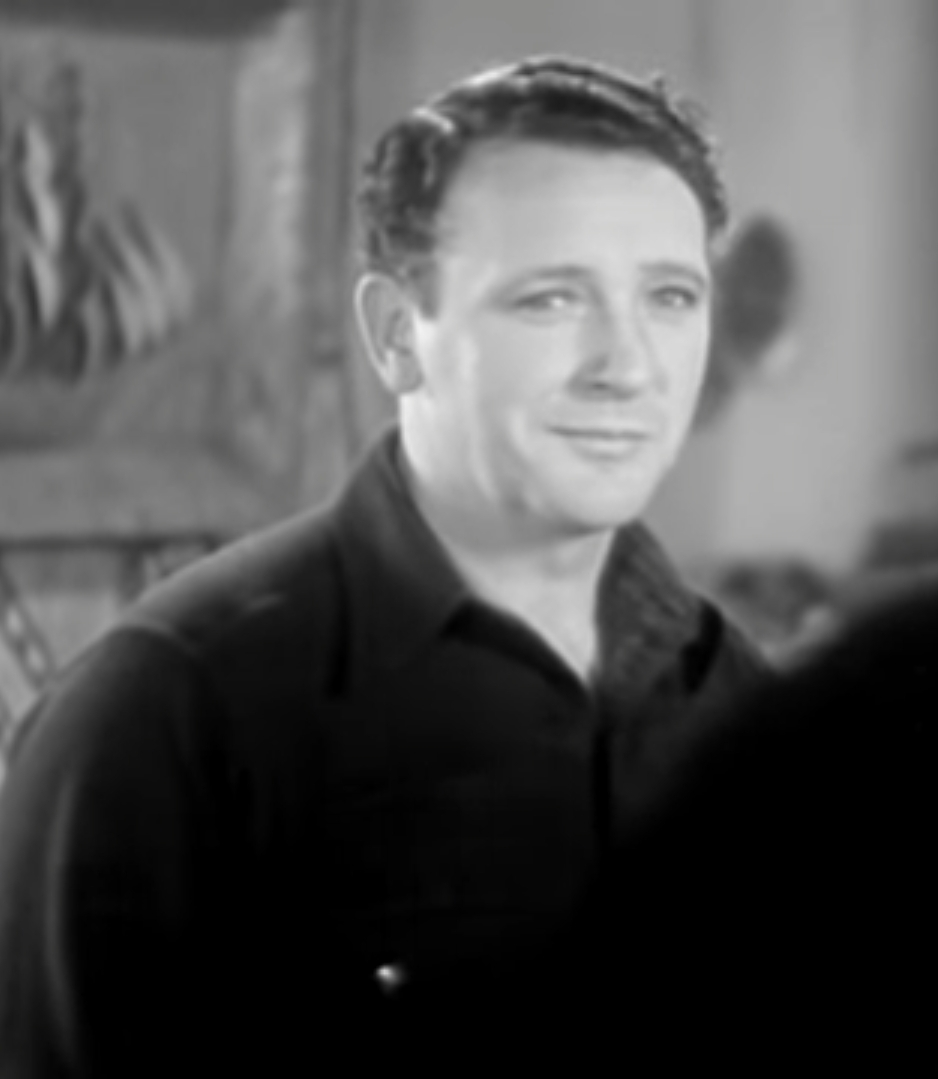
- Talmadge in The Live Wire (1935)
- Born: Sylvester Alphonse Metz; 3 December 1892; Munich, German Empire
- Died: 25 January 1981 (aged 88); Carmel, California, U.S.
- Resting place: Inglewood Park Cemetery
- Other names: Sylvester Metzetti; Ricardo Metzetti; Sylvester Ricardo Metzetti; Richard Metzetti Talmadge
- Occupations: Actor; stuntman; film director
- Years active: 1910–1967
- Spouse(s): Madeleine Francis Allen (m. 1917; div. 19??) Suzanne Avery (m. 1961)
- Children: 1 (stepdaughter)

Richard Talmadge (born Sylvester Alphonse Metz; 3 December 1892 – 25 January 1981) also known as Sylvester Metzetti, Ricardo Metzetti, or Sylvester Ricardo Metzetti, was a German-born American actor, stuntman and film director.

== Early life ==
Born in Germany in 1892, Talmadge arrived in Hollywood in 1910 and began his career as a stuntman (including a stint with Douglas Fairbanks) before becoming an actor himself. He began starring in silent action pictures in 1921, and began producing his own vehicles in 1923. His last silent feature, The Poor Millionaire (1930), was the very last silent production filmed in Hollywood (except for two Charlie Chaplin silent features that were released well after the advent of sound).

== Career ==
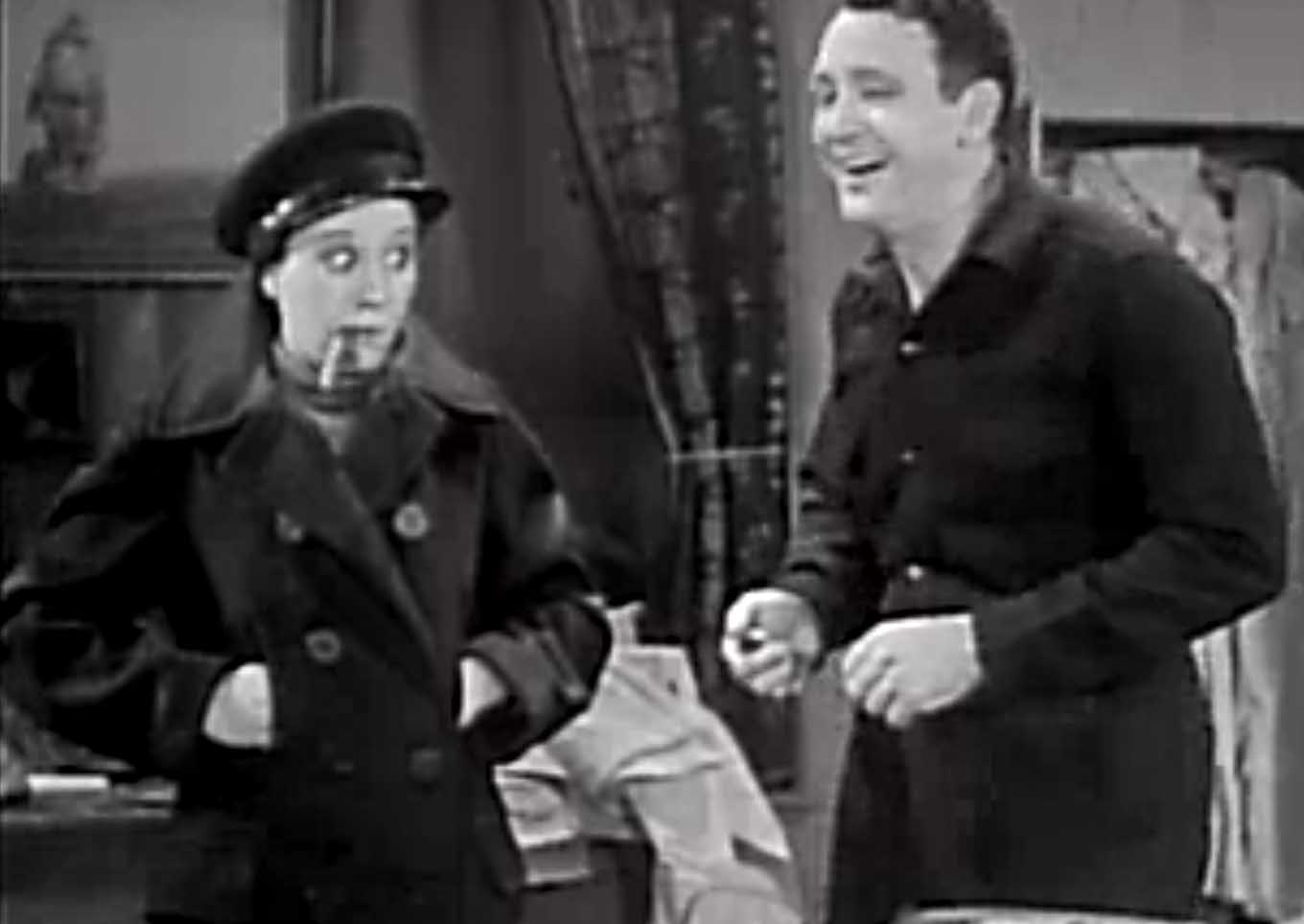
Alberta Vaughn and Talmadge share a cigar in The Live Wire, 1935

Richard Talmadge spoke fluent English, but with a German accent that became obvious when talkies arrived. Still acting as his own producer, he began starring in lower-budgeted features. His accent didn't matter much in these pictures, which had Talmadge in almost constant motion, doing spectacular stunts throughout the films. During the Depression he gave up his production company and signed with a major studio, Universal Pictures, where he starred in the 12-chapter serial Pirate Treasure (1934). Independent producers Bernard B. Ray and Harry S. Webb then signed Talmadge for a series of action features, with titles emphasizing Talmadge's breakneck speed: Never Too Late, Step on It, The Live Wire, etc. These were his last starring efforts.

Talmadge then began working behind the cameras as assistant director, stunt coordinator, and director. His later work included How the West Was Won, The Greatest Story Ever Told and Casino Royale.

== Personal life ==
He was the stepfather of American polo pioneer Sue Sally Hale. His brothers, Otto and Victor Metzetti, both had success as stunt performers, and were members of the vaudeville troupe the Flying Metzettis, (or the Five Metzettis) who were the first to perform the quadruple back somersault in 1917, at Barnum and Bailey's, with Richard as voltiguer. The family was close, with brothers Otto, Victor, and Leon working on the Richard Talmadge productions of the 1930s.

== Death ==
Talmadge died of cancer at the age of 88 on 25 January 1981, in Carmel, California. He is interred at Inglewood Park Cemetery, his grave marked with the name "Richard Metzetti Talmadge".

== Selected filmography ==
- Taking Chances (1922)
- The Unknown (1922)
- The Cub Reporter (1922)
- Wildcat Jordan (1922)
- Lucky Dan (1922)
- Danger Ahead (1923)
- Let's Go (1923)
- On Time (1924)
- American Manners (1924)
- Stepping Lively (1924)
- Laughing at Danger (1924)
- In Fast Company (1924)
- The Prince of Pep (1925)
- The Fighting Demon (1925)
- Youth and Adventure (1925)
- Tearing Through (1925)
- The Wall Street Whiz (1925)
- Jimmie's Millions (1925)
- The Mysterious Stranger (1925)
- The Blue Streak (1926)
- The Better Man (1926)
- Doubling with Danger (1926)
- The Night Patrol (1926)
- The Merry Cavalier (1926)
- The Cavalier (1928)
- The Bachelor's Club (1929)
- Sonny Boy (1929)
- The Poor Millionaire (1930, his last silent feature)
- Yankee Don (1931, his first sound feature)
- Scareheads (1931)
- Speed Madness (1932)
- Get That Girl (1932)
- Pirate Treasure (1934, serial)
- The Fighting Pilot (1935)
- Now or Never (1935)
- The Live Wire (1935)
- Never Too Late (1935)
- Step on It (1936)
- The Speed Reporter (1936)
- Black Eagle (1948)
- Fortunes of Captain Blood (1950)
- Border Outlaws (1950) (director)
- Project Moonbase (1953) (director)
- I Killed Wild Bill Hickok (1956) (director)
- Casino Royale (1967) (director) (uncredited)
