= Jack Stevens (cinematographer) =

American cinematographer (1903–61)

- Born: November 2, 1903; Oakland, California, United States
- Died: June 17, 1961 (aged 57); Los Angeles, California, United States
- Occupation: Cinematographer
- Years active: 1921–1938 (film)
- Father: Landers Stevens
- Relatives: George Stevens (brother)

Jack Stevens (1903–1961) was an American cinematographer active during the silent and early sound era. He worked on several Laurel and Hardy films for Hal Roach Studios. His father was actor Landers Stevens. He was the elder brother of the director George Stevens.

== Selected filmography ==
- Mine to Keep (1923)
- Other Men's Daughters (1923)
- American Manners (1924)
- The Law Forbids (1924)
- Stepping Lively (1924)
- The Fighting Demon (1925)
- The Isle of Hope (1925)
- The Broadway Gallant (1926)
- The Night Patrol (1926)
- The Merry Cavalier (1926)
- The Better Man (1926)
- The Blue Streak (1926)
- The Cavalier (1928)
- Another Fine Mess (1930)
- Beau Hunks (1931)
- Pardon Us (1931)
- Our Wife (1931)
- Chickens Come Home (1931)
- Speed Madness (1932)
- Get That Girl (1932)
- On Your Guard (1933)
- The Cuckoo Clock (1938)

== Bibliography ==
- Bliss, Michael. Laurel and Hardy's Comic Catastrophes: Laughter and Darkness in the Features and Short Films. Rowman & Littlefield, 2017.
- Slide, Anthony. She Could Be Chaplin!: The Comedic Brilliance of Alice Howell. University Press of Mississippi, 2016.
