= The Snob (1921 film) =

1921 film directed by Sam Wood

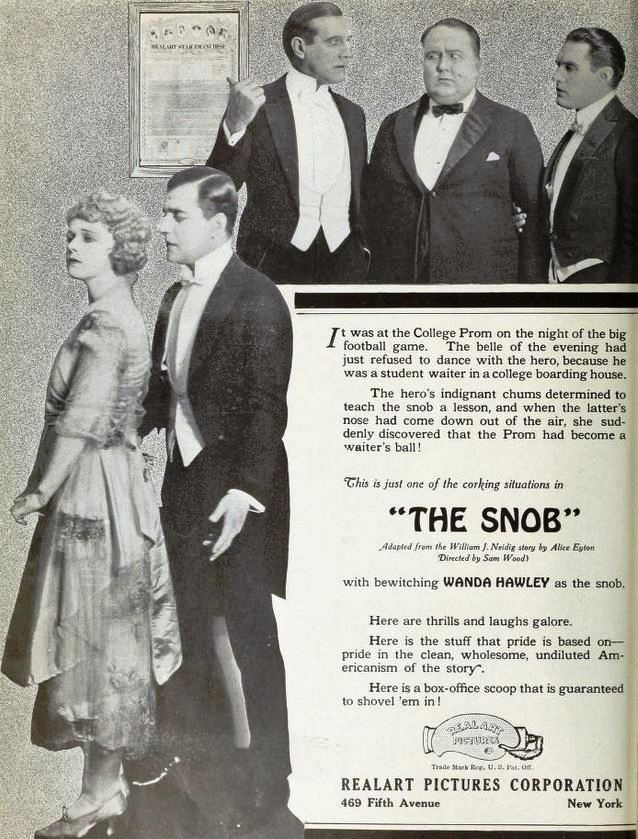
- Advertisement
- Directed by: Sam Wood
- Screenplay by: Alice Eyton
- Based on: The Snob by William J. Neidig
- Starring: Wanda Hawley; Edwin Stevens; Walter Hiers; Sylvia Ashton; W. E. Lawrence; Julia Faye
- Cinematography: Alfred Gilks
- Production company: Realart Pictures Corporation
- Distributed by: Realart Pictures Corporation
- Release date: January 1921
- Running time: 50 minutes
- Country: United States
- Language: Silent (English intertitles)

The Snob is a lost 1921 American silent comedy film directed by Sam Wood, written by Alice Eyton, and starring Wanda Hawley, Edwin Stevens, Walter Hiers, Sylvia Ashton, W. E. Lawrence, and Julia Faye. It was released in January 1921, by Realart Pictures Corporation.

== Cast ==
- Wanda Hawley as Kathryn Haynes
- Edwin Stevens as Jim Haynes
- Walter Hiers as Pud Welland
- Sylvia Ashton as Mrs. Haynes
- W. E. Lawrence as Capt. William Putnam
- Julia Faye as Betty Welland
- Richard Wayne as 'Pep' Kennedy
- Josephine Crowell
- Althea Worthley
