= A Broadway Saint =

1919 film

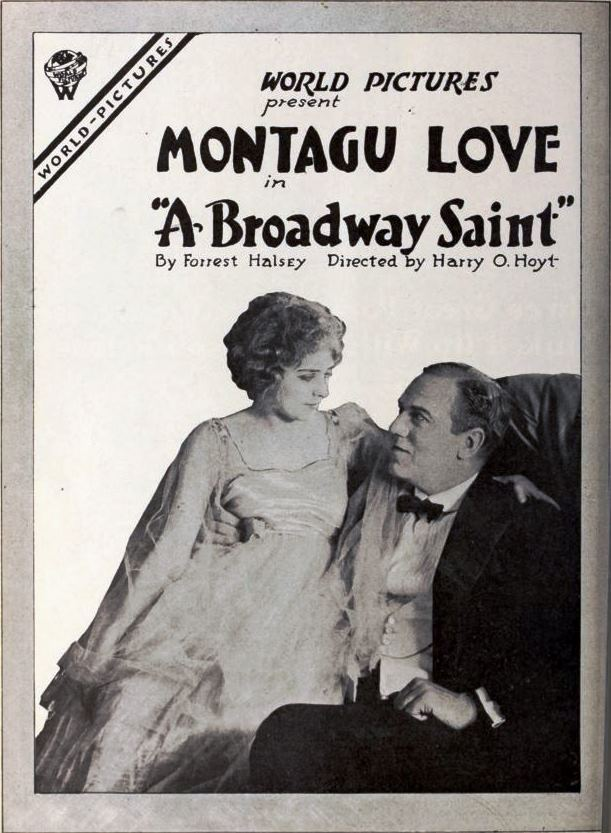
- Directed by: Harry O. Hoyt
- Written by: Forrest Halsey; Giles Warren
- Starring: Montagu Love; George Bunny; Helen Weir
- Cinematography: Ned Van Buren
- Production company: World Film
- Distributed by: World Film
- Release date: July 21, 1921
- Running time: 50 minutes
- Country: United States
- Languages: Silent; English intertitles

A Broadway Saint is a lost 1919 American silent comedy film directed by Harry O. Hoyt and starring Montagu Love, George Bunny and Helen Weir.

== Cast ==
- Montagu Love as Dick Vernon
- George Bunny as Uncle Galt
- Helen Weir as Mazie Chateaux
- Emile La Croix as Professor Lackland
- Augusta Burmeister as Mrs. Unger
- Emily Fitzroy as Martha Galt
- Annie Laurie Spence asLucilla Galt
- Mrs. Stuart Robson as Madam Chateaux
- Edward Arnold as Mr. Frewen
- Sally Crute as Mrs. Frewen
- Estelle Taylor as The Parisian

== Preservation ==
With no holdings located in archives, A Broadway Saint is considered a lost film.

== Bibliography ==
- Katchmer, George A. Eighty Silent Film Stars: Biographies and Filmographies of the Obscure to the Well Known. McFarland, 1991.
