= Piccadilly Jim (1919 film) =

1919 film

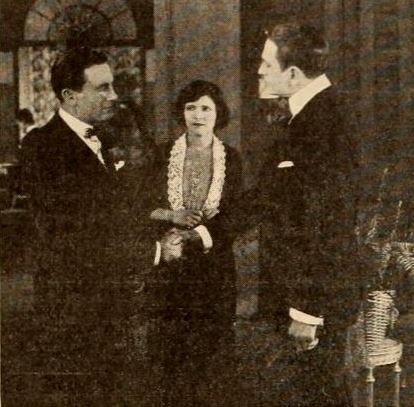
- A scene from the film
- Directed by: Wesley Ruggles
- Based on: Piccadilly Jim; 1917 novel by P. G. Wodehouse
- Produced by: Selznick Pictures Corporation
- Starring: Owen Moore; Zena Keefe; George Bunny
- Cinematography: George Peters
- Production company: Selznick Pictures
- Distributed by: Select Pictures Corp.
- Release date: December 1919
- Running time: 5 reels
- Country: United States
- Language: Silent (English intertitles)

Piccadilly Jim is a silent romantic comedy film released in 1919. The cast includes Owen Moore, Zena Keefe, and George Bunny. It is based on the 1917 novel Piccadilly Jim by P. G. Wodehouse. Wesley Ruggles directed. It was filmed in New York City and produced by Selznick Pictures Corporation. Two other films based on the same novel were also released, 1936 film and a 2004 film.

== Cast ==
- Owen Moore as James Crocker, also known as Piccadilly Jim
- Zena Keefe as Ann Chester
- George Bunny as Mr. Bingley Crocker
- William T. Hays as Peter Pett
- Dora Mills Adams as Mrs. Peter Pett
- Alfred Hickman as Lord Wisebeach
- Reginald Sheffield as Ogden Pett
