= John McKay (director) =

Scottish film and television director (born 1965)

John McKay (born 1965) is a Scottish film and television director. His initial career was as a playwright, before he began his film career by directing the short films Doom and Gloom (1996) and Wet and Dry (1997).

== Career ==
McKay's short films brought him some notable early acclaim: Wet and Dry was nominated in the "Best Short Fiction" category at the Molodist International Film Festival in Kyiv in 1997, Doom and Gloom won a "Special Mention" in the "Youth on Youth Award" category at the 1998 Locarno International Film Festival, and the "Best European Short Film" prize at the 1999 Brussels International Film Festival.

After working on the television series Psychos for Kudos and Channel 4 in 1999, he directed his first full-length feature film, Crush, starring Andie MacDowell, Imelda Staunton, Anna Chancellor, and Kenny Doughty for which he also wrote the screenplay. Released in 2001, the film was originally to have been titled The Sad Fuckers Club, but this was changed after resistance from the producers and distributors and uneasiness on the part of test audiences. Crush met with a generally negative critical reaction, and a second feature that McKay had written and was planning to direct, the World War II-set Knickers, never saw production.

Following Crush McKay returned to television, in 2003 directing "The Miller's Tale" and "The Sea Captain's Tale" for BBC One's updated versions of Chaucer's The Canterbury Tales, where the events of the stories were transposed to contemporary settings. "The Miller's Tale", which opened the series, proved to be a particular success, with an audience of 7.6 million viewers and a mixed but generally favourable critical reaction. In 2004, McKay returned to the cinema with his second full-length feature, directing Academy Award-winning screenwriter Julian Fellowes's adaptation of P. G. Wodehouse's novel Piccadilly Jim.

He continued to direct for television, in 2006 helming the third and fourth instalments of the time travel/police drama series Life on Mars. Life on Mars gained particular critical and popular acclaim, with reviewer Nancy Banks-Smith of The Guardian describing McKay's second episode, the series' fourth, as "an inspired take on the usual formula of Gruff Copper of the old school." Later that same year he directed the opening two episodes of the channel's new Robin Hood series.

In 2007, McKay directed Reichenbach Falls, a 75-minute one-off drama for digital television channel BBC Four, adapted by James Mavor from a short story by Ian Rankin. Another one-off drama for BBC Four, We'll Take Manhattan, about the relationship between model Jean Shrimpton and photographer David Bailey, was broadcast in January 2012. McKay both wrote and directed We'll Take Manhattan. His third full-length feature film, Not Another Happy Ending, from a script by David Solomons, was released in 2013.

== Personal life ==
McKay is married, with children.
