= The Cancelled Debt =

1927 film directed by Phil Rosen

- Directed by: Phil Rosen
- Written by: Frances Guihan
- Starring: Rex Lease; Charlotte Stevens; Florence Turner
- Cinematography: Herbert Kirkpatrick
- Production company: Banner Productions
- Distributed by: Sterling Pictures
- Release date: September 1, 1927 (US)
- Running time: 58 minutes
- Country: United States
- Language: English

The Cancelled Debt is a 1927 American silent melodrama film, directed by Phil Rosen. It stars Rex Lease, Charlotte Stevens, and Florence Turner, and was released on September 1, 1927.

== Plot ==
June Butler is given a speeding ticket by motorcycle policeman Patrick Burke. Later, when Burke foils a robbery attempt by Jimmy Martin at the Butler residence, June, still peeved by the ticket, lies and says that Jimmy is not a burglar but her boyfriend. She gets him a job in her father's company, after she finds out he needed money to support his wife and child. June receives another ticket from Burke, this time for parking next to a fire hydrant, and her annoyance level is raised to the point that she has her father use his influence to get Burke demoted. However, after he saves June from a mugging, and later saves her and Jimmy from being attacked by Jimmy's former gang, he gets back into her good graces and the two eventually end up as a couple.

== Cast ==
- Rex Lease as Patrick Burke
- Charlotte Stevens as June Butler
- Florence Turner as Mrs. Burke
- Billy Sullivan as Jimmy Martin
- James Gordon as Mr. Butler
- Ethel Grey Terry as Mrs. Martin

== Production ==
In February 1927, The Cancelled Debt was on Sterling Pictures' production schedule for the year. The film went into production in early August, the last of 18 films on Sterling's schedule. The film was released on September 1.

== Reception ==
Moving Picture World said, "There have been many pictures made glorifying the police officer, some of which have been rather good and others rather terrible", but felt that this film, "with a little pruning here and there will provide satisfactory entertainment."
