= George Bunny =

American actor

- Born: July 13, 1867; New York City, United States
- Died: April 16, 1952 (aged 84); Hollywood, California, United States
- Years active: 1915–1951
- Relatives: John Bunny (brother)

George Bunny (July 13, 1867 – April 16, 1952) was an American actor.

== Biography ==
The brother of actor John Bunny, he began his career during the silent era and benefited from the name recognition of his famous brother—according to the film scholar Anthony Slide, his "silent career was based on exploitation of the family name". Of a similarly heavy build, he appeared in sixty-six films between 1915 and 1951. The Moving Picture World declared, "No one who remembers the inimitable John Bunny and the peculiar style that so endeared him to comedy lovers the world over can fail to see in George Bunny almost an exact counterpart of his famous brother." Regarding his role in Friend Husband (1918), the magazine said, "[George] Bunny was engaged for the part because he resembled the dead comedian John Bunny both facially and in his ability to make big comedy capital out of a not unusual situation." The magazine had earlier praised his performance in the movie, saying, "George Bunny ... plays a lovable role in support of Madge Kennedy and promises many moments of quiet fun." After sound was introduced to films, Bunny moved on to mostly bit parts. He was born in New York City, New York, and died in Hollywood, California, from a heart attack.

== Selected filmography ==
- The Heart of Romance (1918)
- Friend Husband (1918)
- A Broadway Saint (1919)
- Piccadilly Jim (1919)
- 'If Only' Jim (1920)
- Danger Ahead (1921)
- The Super-Sex (1922)
- The Lost World (1925)
- Enticement (1925)
- Lights of Old Broadway (1925)
- Thrilling Youth (1926)
- The Roaring Road (1926)
- The Tender Hour (1927)
- Heroes in Blue (1927)
- The Love Mart (1927)
- Laddie Be Good (1928)
- The Man and the Moment (1929)
- The Locked Door (1929)
- Wild Horse (1931)
