= Louisiana (1919 film) =

1919 film by Robert G. Vignola

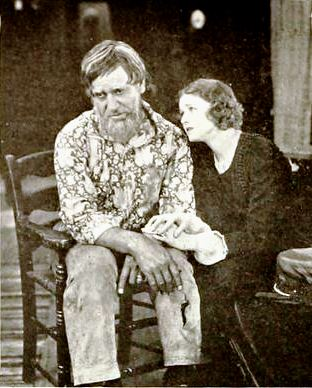
- Still with Noah Beery and Vivian Martin
- Directed by: Robert G. Vignola
- Screenplay by: Frances Hodgson Burnett; Alice Eyton
- Produced by: Jesse L. Lasky
- Starring: Vivian Martin; Robert Ellis; Noah Beery, Sr. Arthur Allardt; Lillian West; Lillian Leighton
- Cinematography: Frank E. Garbutt
- Production company: Famous Players–Lasky Corporation
- Distributed by: Paramount Pictures
- Release date: July 20, 1919
- Running time: 50 minutes
- Country: United States
- Language: Silent (English intertitles)

Louisiana is a lost 1919 American silent comedy film directed by Robert G. Vignola and written by Frances Hodgson Burnett and Alice Eyton. The film stars Vivian Martin, Robert Ellis, Noah Beery, Sr., Arthur Allardt, Lillian West and Lillian Leighton. The film was released on July 20, 1919, by Paramount Pictures.

== Plot ==
It is a comedic love story.

== Cast ==
- Vivian Martin as Louisiana Rogers
- Robert Ellis as Laurence Ferol
- Noah Beery, Sr. as Lem Rogers
- Arthur Allardt as Cass Floyd
- Lillian West as Olivia Ferol
- Lillian Leighton as Aunt Cassandry
