= American Manners =

1924 film by James W. Horne

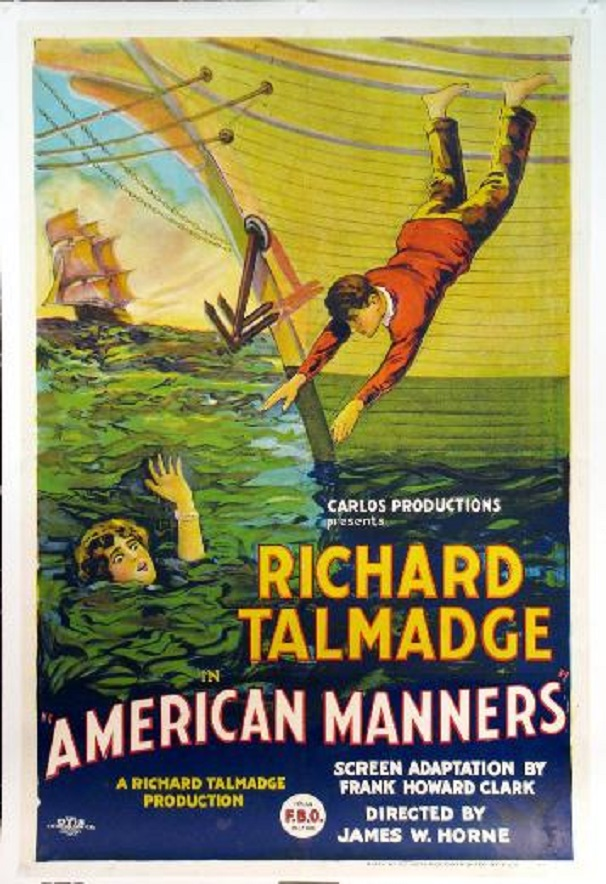
- Directed by: James W. Horne
- Written by: Frank Howard Clark; Joseph Farnham (intertitles)
- Produced by: Richard Talmadge Productions; A. Carlos
- Starring: Richard Talmadge
- Cinematography: William Marshall; Jack Stevens
- Production company: Truart Film Corporation
- Distributed by: Film Booking Offices of America
- Release date: August 24, 1924
- Running time: 6 reels
- Country: United States
- Languages: Silent; English intertitles

American Manners is a 1924 American silent drama film directed by James W. Horne. It was produced by Richard Talmadge, who also stars, and was distributed by FBO.

Preserved in the Library of Congress.

== Cast ==
- Richard Talmadge as Roy Thomas
- Mark Fenton as Dan Thomas
- Lee Shumway as Clyde Harven
- Helen Lynch as Gloria Winthrop
- Arthur Millett as Conway
- William H. Turner as Jonas Winthrop
- Pat Harmon as Mike Barclay
- George Warde as Bud (a waif)
