= The Gentle Cyclone =

1926 film

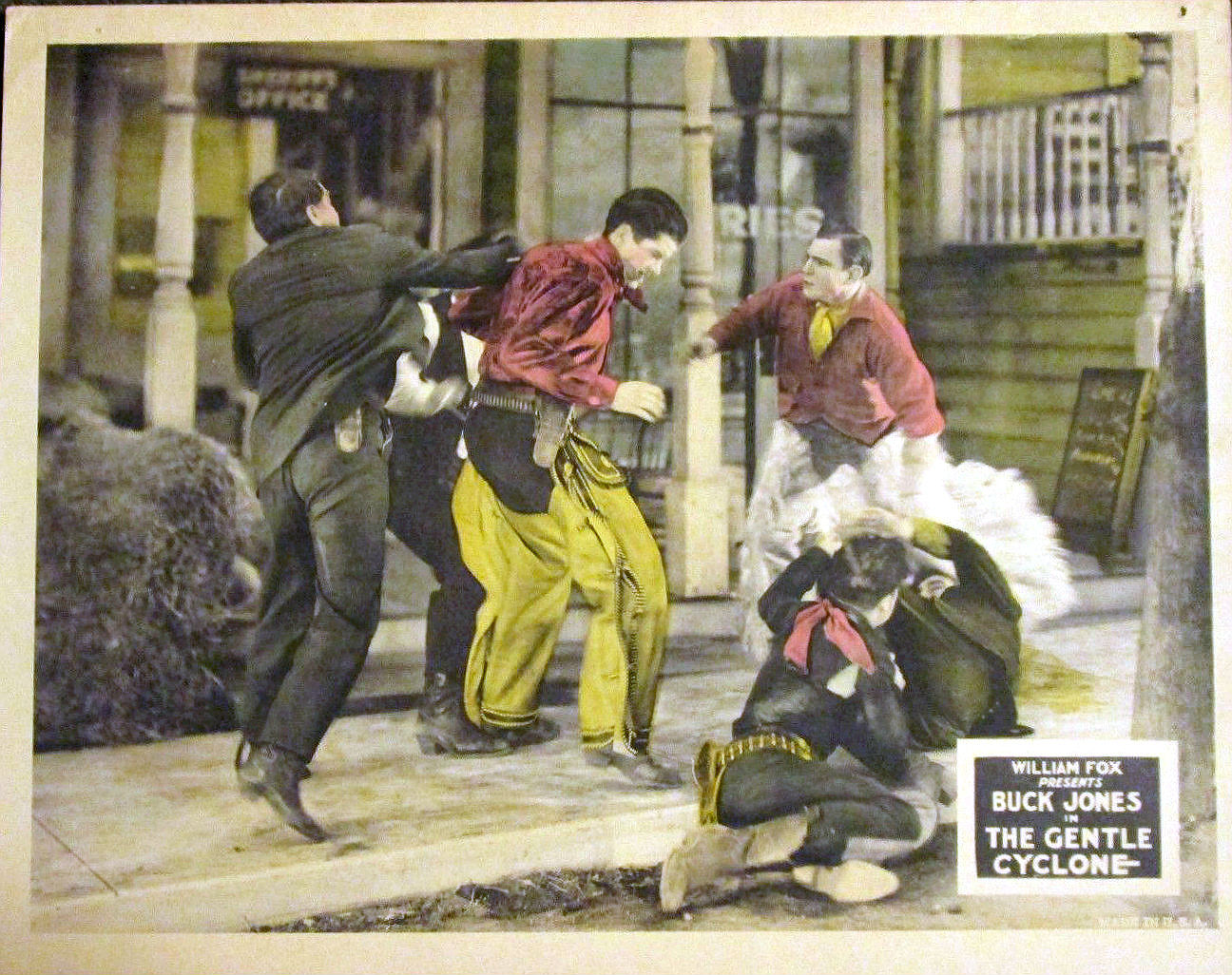
- Lobby card
- Directed by: W.S. Van Dyke
- Written by: Frank R. Buckley; Thomas Dixon Jr.
- Starring: Oliver Hardy
- Cinematography: Chester A. Lyons; Reginald Lyons
- Distributed by: Fox Film Corporation
- Release date: June 27, 1926
- Running time: 5 reels
- Country: United States
- Languages: Silent; English intertitles

The Gentle Cyclone is a 1926 American silent Western comedy film directed by W. S. Van Dyke and starring Buck Jones featuring Oliver Hardy. It was produced and released by the Fox Film Corporation. Even though a 38-second movie trailer has survived, The Gentle Cyclone is now a lost film.

== Cast ==
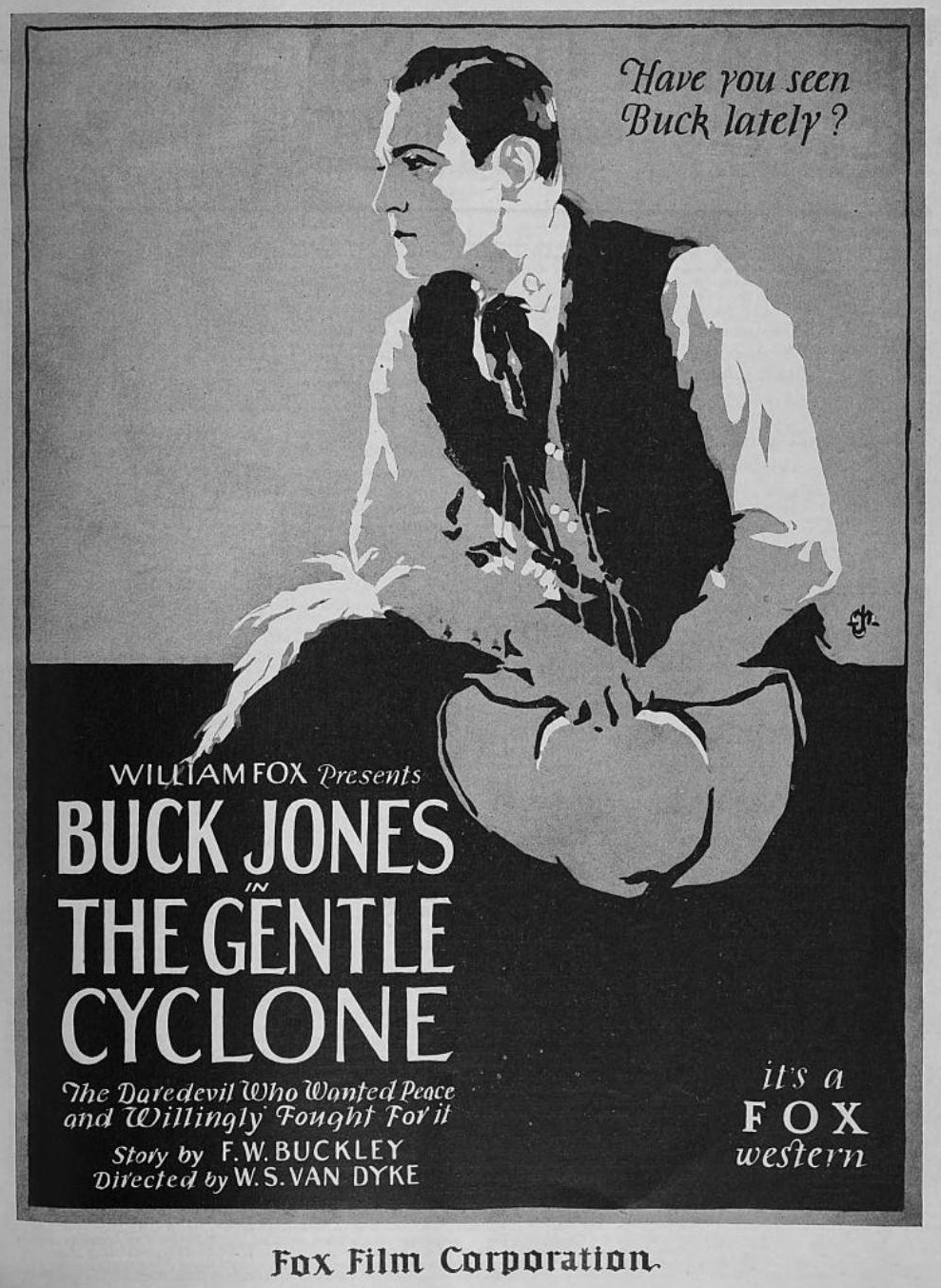
Magazine ad

- Buck Jones as Absolem Wales
- Rose Blossom as June Prowitt
- Will Walling as Marshall Senior
- Reed Howes as Marshall Junior
- Stanton Heck as Wilkes Senior
- Grant Withers as Wilkes Junior
- Kathleen Myers as Mary Wilkes
- Jay Hunt as Judge Summerfield
- Oliver Hardy as Sheriff Bill

== See also ==
- List of American films of 1926
- Oliver Hardy filmography
