= The Bride of the Colorado =

1928 film by Elmer Clifton

- Directed by: Elmer Clifton
- Screenplay by: John Farrow
- Starring: John Boles; Rose Blossom
- Cinematography: Hendrik Sartov; Carl Webster
- Production company: DeMille Pictures Corporation
- Distributed by: Pathé Exchange
- Release date: 1928
- Running time: 5 or 6 reels?
- Country: United States
- Language: Silent (English intertitles)

The Bride of the Colorado is a 1928 American silent romantic drama film directed by Elmer Clifton starring John Boles and Rose Blossom.

== Plot ==
Although the film was intended to be a drama with romantic interest during a transit of the Colorado River, a short film review in Photoplay magazine stated that the spectacle of the Colorado River with its rapids and the Grand Canyon where the lead of the picture, with the characters and plot "absolutely incidental" to the background scenery.

== Cast ==
- John Boles as John Barrows
- Rose Blossom as Mary Jenkins (credited as Donal Blossom)
- William Irving as Fritz Mueller
- Henry Sedley as Regan
- Carl Stockdale as Old Man Jenkins
- Richard Alexander as Dirk
- Mae Busch (uncredited)

== Production ==
Filming occurred on the Colorado River within the Grand Canyon National Park using six boats. According to testimony in a lawsuit, Boles was paid $600 per week, Blossom $150 per week, Irving $300 per week, Sedley and Stockdale $225 per week, and Alexander $125 per week.

According to the IMDb, a copyright was never issued for this film.
