= Catch-As-Catch-Can (1927 film) =

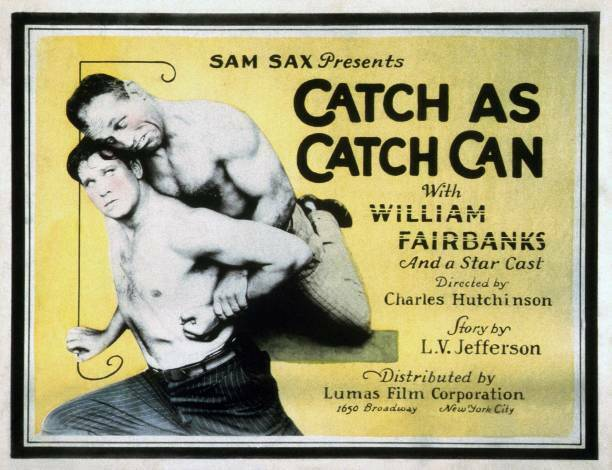
- Directed by: Charles Hutchison
- Written by: L.V. Jefferson
- Produced by: Samuel Bischoff; Samuel Sax
- Starring: William Fairbanks; Rose Blossom; Walter Shumway
- Cinematography: James S. Brown Jr.
- Production company: Gotham Pictures
- Distributed by: Lumas Film Corporation
- Release date: June 1, 1927
- Running time: 50 minutes
- Country: United States
- Languages: Silent; English intertitles

Catch-As-Catch-Can is a 1927 American silent sports crime film directed by Charles Hutchison and starring William Fairbanks, Rose Blossom and Walter Shumway

== Cast ==
- William Fairbanks as Reed Powers
- Jack Blossom as George Bascom
- Rose Blossom as Lucille Bascom
- Larry Shannon as Phil Bascom
- Walter Shumway as Ward Hastings
- George Kotsonaros as Butch
- Georgie Chapman as Slippery Schnitzel

== Bibliography ==
- Hal Erickson. Baseball in the Movies: A Comprehensive Reference, 1915-1991. McFarland, 1992.
