= Charlotte Stevens =

American film actress (1902-1942)

- Born: August 25, 1902; Chicago, Illinois, United States
- Died: January 15, 1942 (aged 39); Los Angeles, California, United States
- Occupation: Actress
- Years active: 1914–1928 (film)

Amelia Charlotte Stevens (1902–1942) was an American film actress of the silent era playing a mixture of lead and supporting roles.

Stevens was a native of Galesburg, Illinois. Her career in entertainment began when she won a Christie contract in a beauty contest in Chicago. She acted in films for 1 1/2 years and then acted on stage. In her later years she became a writer.

Stevens died in a Los Angeles hospital on January 15, 1942. She was cremated.

== Selected filmography ==
- Mine to Keep (1923)
- The Tornado (1924)
- The Mirage (1924)
- One Law for the Woman (1924)
- Riders Up (1924)
- Flying Hoofs (1925)
- With Kit Carson Over the Great Divide (1925)
- The Merry Cavalier (1926)
- The Heart of a Coward (1926)
- King of the Pack (1926)
- The Cancelled Debt (1927)
- The Coward (1927)
- Thunder Riders (1928)

== Bibliography ==
- Munden, Kenneth White. The American Film Institute Catalog of Motion Pictures Produced in the United States, Part 1. University of California Press, 1997.
