= Stepping Lively =

1924 film directed by James W. Horne

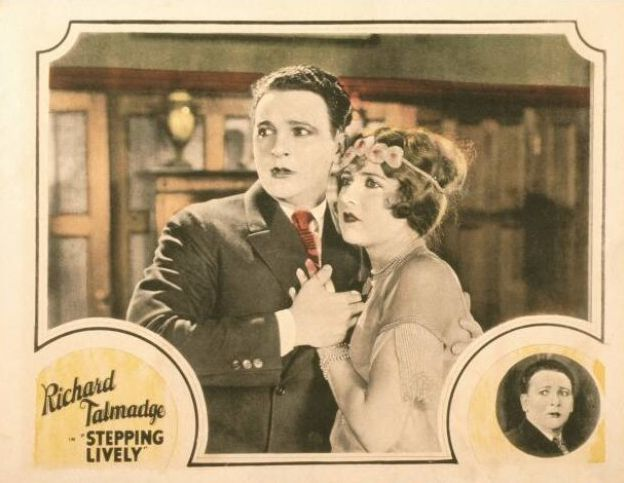
- Directed by: James W. Horne
- Written by: Frank Howard Clark
- Starring: Richard Talmadge; Mildred Harris; Norval MacGregor
- Cinematography: William Marshall; Jack Stevens
- Production companies: Carlos Productions; Truart Film Corporation
- Distributed by: Film Booking Offices of America
- Release date: September 28, 1924
- Running time: 60 minutes
- Country: United States
- Languages: Silent; English intertitles

Stepping Lively is a 1924 American silent action film directed by James W. Horne and starring Richard Talmadge, Mildred Harris and Norval MacGregor.

== Cast ==
- Richard Talmadge as Dave Allen
- Mildred Harris as Evelyn Pendroy
- Norval MacGregor as James Pendroy
- Brinsley Shaw as Robbins
- Fred Kelsey as Detective Artemus Doolittle
- Mario Carillo as Josef Le Baron
- William Clifford as Black Mike
- John Webb Dillion as Detective Dan Carter
- Victor Metzetti as Chicago Red

== Preservation ==
Formerly lost, the film exists in a French archive, Archives du Film du CNC (Bois d'Arcy).

== Bibliography ==
- Munden, Kenneth White. The American Film Institute Catalog of Motion Pictures Produced in the United States, Part 1. University of California Press, 1997.
