= The Tornado (1924 film) =

1924 silent film

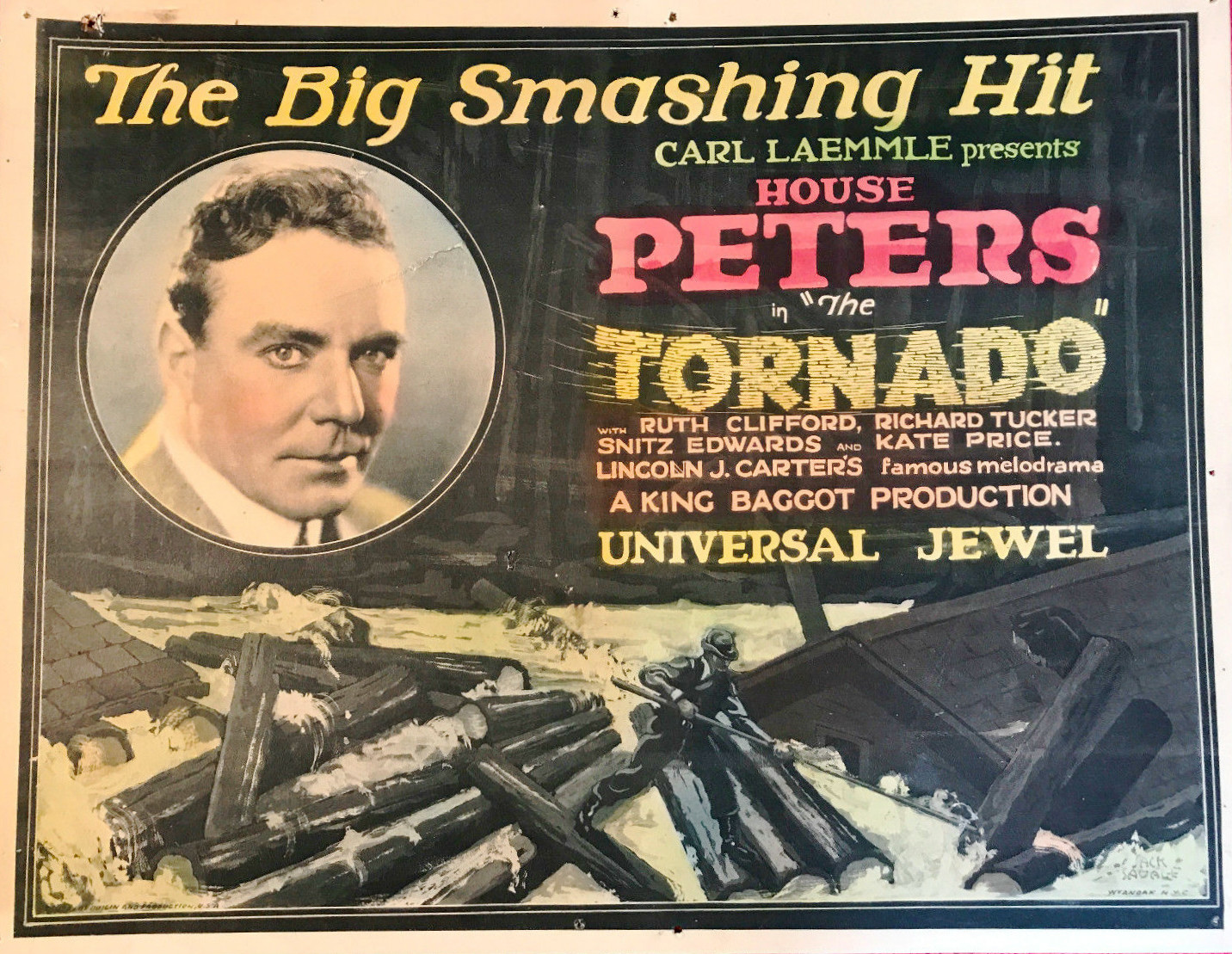
- Lobby card
- Directed by: King Baggot
- Written by: Grant Carpenter
- Based on: The Tornado by Lincoln J. Carter
- Produced by: Carl Laemmle
- Starring: House Peters; Ruth Clifford; Richard Tucker
- Cinematography: John Stumar
- Production company: Universal Pictures
- Distributed by: Universal Pictures
- Release date: December 14, 1924
- Running time: 70 minutes
- Country: United States
- Language: Silent (English intertitles)

The Tornado is a 1924 American silent drama film directed by King Baggot and starring House Peters, Ruth Clifford, and Richard Tucker.

== Plot ==
As described in a review in a film magazine, grim and severe, but with a kindly heart, the boss of the lumber camp (Peters) was known as Tornado. Returning to his shack in the village, he sees Ruth Travers (Clifford), the girl he has come to the wilderness to forget, and her husband Ross (Tucker). Ruth sends word by her husband that she must see Tornado, but the husband lies to keep them apart. Tornado, learning the couple are unhappy, reaches the hotel in time to prevent Ruth from being beaten by her husband, and tells her the story of his perfidy, how he left Tornado to die in France, lied about him, and finally won Ruth. The Travers' start to leave on an early train, but a cyclone comes up. The storm causes a log jam, and flood waters damage houses in the camp. Tornado manages to break the log jam and save the town, but the logs pile against the bridge and destroy it as the train is going over. Tornado saves Ruth and goes back for her husband, but it is too late to save him.

== Cast ==
- House Peters as Tornado
- Ruth Clifford as Ruth Travers
- Richard Tucker as Ross Travers
- Snitz Edwards as Pewee
- Dick Sutherland as Gorilla
- Jack Morgan as Hurricane
- Kate Price as Emily
- Charlotte Stevens as Molly Jones
- Fred Gamble as Pa Jones
- Carolyn Irwin as Ma Jones
- Jim Welch as Drunk

== Preservation ==
A complete print of The Tornado is held by the EYE Film Institute Netherlands.

== Bibliography ==
- Munden, Kenneth White. The American Film Institute Catalog of Motion Pictures Produced in the United States, Part 1. University of California Press, 1997.
