= Riders Up =

1924 film

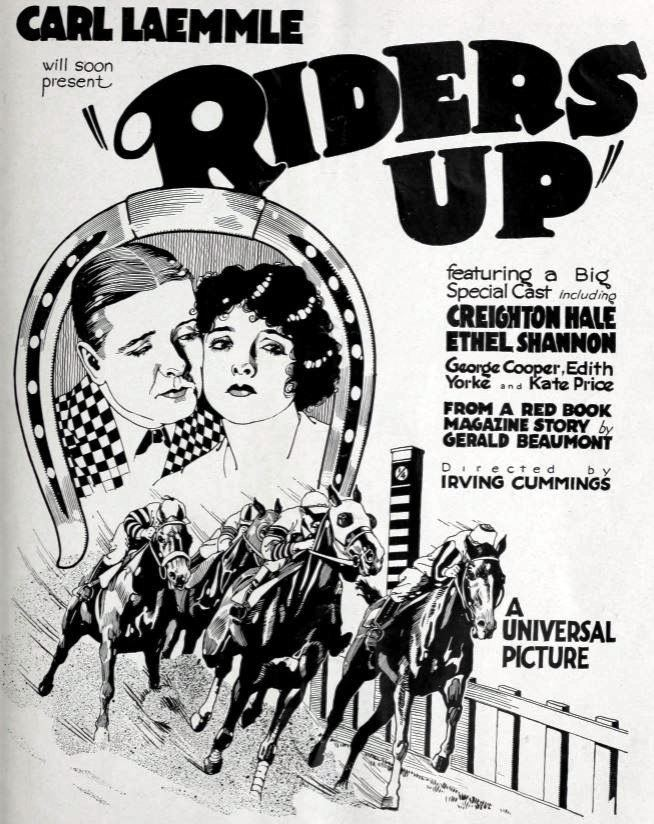
- Advertisement
- Directed by: Irving Cummings
- Written by: Monte Brice
- Produced by: Carl Laemmle
- Starring: Creighton Hale; George Cooper; Kate Price
- Cinematography: Ben F. Reynolds
- Production company: Universal Pictures
- Distributed by: Universal Pictures
- Release date: May 5, 1924
- Running time: 50 minutes
- Country: United States
- Language: Silent (English intertitles)

Riders Up is a 1924 American silent drama film directed by Irving Cummings and starring Creighton Hale, George Cooper, and Kate Price.

== Plot ==
As described in a film magazine review, Johnny is a racehorse track tout, but has concealed this fact from his respectable New England family. Norah Ryan, the daughter of the woman who runs the boarding house where he stays, is his sweetheart. He makes a big winning by gambling on a long shot racehorse at the track in Tijuana and determines to take a long-threatened visit home. However, having taken his aged friend Jeff to the track, and persuaded him that the horse Wildflower, upon whom Jeff has staked all his savings, has won, Johnny sacrifices his winnings to make good on the statement. When things look most gloomy, Norah's mother intervenes and enables Johnny to take the young woman home as his wife.

== Cast ==
- Creighton Hale as Johnny, aka Information Kid
- George Cooper as Henry, the Rat
- Kate Price as Mrs. Ryan
- Robert Brower as General Jeff
- Ethel Shannon as Norah Ryan, The Fiddlin' Doll
- Edith Yorke as Johnny's mother
- Charlotte Stevens as Johnny's sister
- Harry Tracy as Cross-eyed Negro
- Hank Mann as Boarder

== Bibliography ==
- Connelly, Robert B. The Silents: Silent Feature Films, 1910-36, Volume 40, Issue 2. December Press, 1998.
- Munden, Kenneth White. The American Film Institute Catalog of Motion Pictures Produced in the United States, Part 1. University of California Press, 1997.
