= Norval MacGregor =

American actor

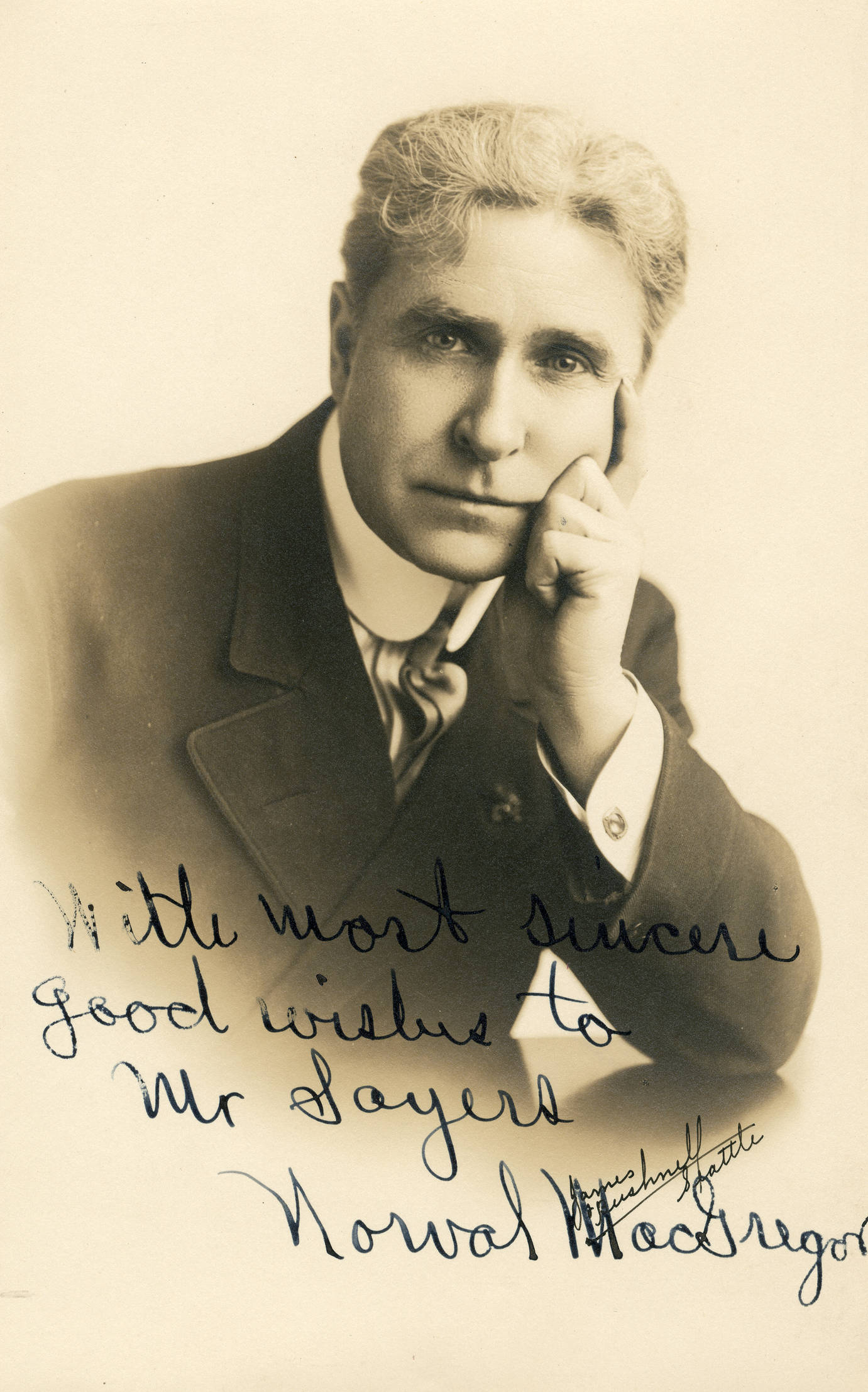

Norval MacGregor (April 3, 1862 – November 21, 1933) was an American producer, director, and actor in silent films and theater. He directed some 88 films, acted in 13, and produced many others.

He was a native of River Falls, Wisconsin.

He was on officer of the Motion Picture Directors Association, served as its treasurer, and in 1919 was on the reception committee for the Motion Picture Directors ball.

The University of Washington Libraries have a photo of him.

== Selected filmography ==
=== Producer ===
- Jimmmie the Porter (1914) by Edwin Ray Coffin
- The Jungle Samaritan (1914)
- Low Financier (1914)
- Newsboy Tenor (1914)
- Harbor of Love (1914)
- Muff (1914)
- Oh! Look Who's Here! (1914)
- Tonsorial Leopard Tamer (1914)
- You Can Never Tell (1914)
- At the Transfer Corner (1914)
- Cupid Turns the Tables (1914)
- Mysterious Black Box (1914)
- No Wedding Bells for Her (1914)
- Surprise Party (1914)

=== Director ===
- One Hundred Years of Mormonism (1913)
- The Awful Adventures of An Aviator (1915)
- Colorado (1915 film)
- Baseball at Mudville (1917)
- Children of Banishment (1919)

=== Actor ===
- The Spoilers (1914)
- The White Scar (1915) as Mackintosh
- The Spirit of '76 (1917)
- The Light of Victory (1919)
- The Mutiny of the Elsinore (1920) as Captain Nathaniel Somers
- A Motion to Adjourn (1921) as Doc Bleeker
- Chain Lightning (1922) as Major Lee Pomeroy
- Courtship of Miles Standish (1923) as William Bradford
- The Face on the Bar-Room Floor (1923)
- Stepping Lively (1924) as James Pendroy
- The Bowery Bishop (1924) as Mr. Kindly
- Phantom Justice (1924) as Wolfe
