= Piccadilly Jim (1936 film) =

1936 film by Robert Zigler Leonard

- Theatrical release lobby card
- Directed by: Robert Z. Leonard
- Written by: Charles Brackett; Edwin H. Knopf
- Based on: Piccadilly Jim; 1917 novel by P. G. Wodehouse
- Produced by: Robert Z. Leonard; Harry Rapf
- Starring: Robert Montgomery; Frank Morgan; Madge Evans; Billie Burke; Cora Witherspoon
- Cinematography: Joseph Ruttenberg
- Edited by: William S. Gray
- Music by: Score: William Axt; Songs: Walter Donaldson (music); Harold Adamson (lyrics)
- Production company: Metro-Goldwyn-Mayer
- Distributed by: Loew's Inc.
- Release date: August 14, 1936
- Running time: 95 minutes
- Country: United States
- Language: English
- Budget: $466,000
- Box office: $1,272,000

Piccadilly Jim is a 1936 American romantic comedy film directed by Robert Z. Leonard and starring Robert Montgomery, Frank Morgan, Madge Evans and Billie Burke. The film is based on the 1917 novel Piccadilly Jim written by P. G. Wodehouse. The first film version of the 1917 novel was Piccadilly Jim (1919) starring Owen Moore and Zena Keefe. A 2004 remake was Piccadilly Jim starring Sam Rockwell and Frances O'Connor.

== Plot ==
In London, American caricaturist Jim Crocker (Robert Montgomery) is a popular man-about-town, known by his pen name 'Piccadilly Jim'. He supports his father James (Frank Morgan), an out-of-work actor with a great admiration for Shakespeare, but also with an inability to remember lines from the Bard's work. Most characters in the film describe James as a ham. Jim lives with his impeccable valet, Bayliss (Eric Blore). Jim is happy when he finds out that his father is to be engaged to Eugenia Willis (Billie Burke), until Eugenia's overbearing married sister, Nesta Pett (Cora Witherspoon), refuses to give permission for the marriage because she has doubts about James' sincerity and financial background. One morning, James tries to introduce the Petts to his son, whom he describes as an artist; but Jim, who has stayed out all night drinking, comes staggering in to find that Nesta Pett has discovered that the "artist" is a caricaturist, which does not impress her.

Meanwhile, Jim meets Nesta Pett's niece, Ann Chester (Madge Evans), in a nightclub and falls in love with her. Ann is engaged to Lord Frederick 'Freddie' Priory (Ralph Forbes) and, therefore, keeps her distance from Jim, despite his several attempts to get to know her better and to woo her. To worsen matters, Jim finds out he is fired because he missed numerous deadlines, and the Petts take Eugenia and Ann with them to the French Riviera for a month, leaving James sad and Jim, who is clueless about Ann's family connection, wondering where she has disappeared to. Jim then develops a comic strip based on the Petts, mainly Nesta, her husband Herbert (Grant Mitchell), and her son Ogden (Tommy Bupp); and it is a huge hit in England. The strip is titled "From Rags to Riches" and features the Richswitch Family. The strip is an instant success, making Jim financially secure: he uses his new wealth to hire a team of detectives to find Ann.

When the Petts return to England, they are recognized as the people from the drawings and are soon the joke of the town, which infuriates them and Ann. Jim, upon learning Ann is the niece of the Petts, hides his identity and poses as the son of his valet Bayliss. He finagles a way to spend a few hours with Ann before her family flees England for the United States, and he works out a way to cross to New York City on the same ship as Ann and Lord Priory. Before leaving England, he tries to cancel the comic strip but learns he doesn't own the rights to it. He also learns that the strip has been picked up by newspapers in the States.

Even though Jim makes the Richwitch Family characters more benevolent, Ann is furious when she finds out that 'Bayliss' son' is actually Piccadilly Jim. The Petts are, on the other hand, enjoying their popularity and welcome Jim. Meanwhile, James poses as the Danish Count Olav Osric to impress the family as Eugenia's lover. Meanwhile, Bayliss suspects that Ann's fiancé Freddie is not a descendant of the wealthy Priory family as he insists, so Jim tries to discredit Freddie. At a party, he announces that he will "unmask the imposter." James – as count Osric – feels this is addressed to him, so he reveals his true identity and is immediately rejected by the Petts.

When he finds out that Freddie is not the liar Bayliss claimed he was, Jim decides to give up his hope of winning Ann's heart and to return to London. On the ship, when Bayliss encourages him not to give up, Jim realizes Bayliss is right and runs for shore, leaping onto the lowering gangplank, where he bumps into Ann, who by then also realized that she is in love with him. In the end, they kiss.

== Cast ==
- Robert Montgomery as James 'Piccadilly Jim' Crocker Jr.
- Frank Morgan as James Crocker/Count Olav Osric
- Madge Evans as Ann Chester
- Eric Blore as Bayliss
- Billie Burke as Eugenia Willis
- Robert Benchley as Bill Macon
- Ralph Forbes as Lord Frederick 'Freddie' Priory
- Cora Witherspoon as Nesta Pett
- Tommy Bupp as Ogden Pett
- Aileen Pringle as Paducah Pomeroy
- Grant Mitchell as Herbert Pett
- E. E. Clive as Editor
- Billy Bevan as Taxi Driver
- Grayce Hampton

== Production ==
David O. Selznick was initially set to produce the Metro-Goldwyn-Mayer musical adaptation of Piccadilly Jim, and in late 1934, Robert Montgomery was assigned to be directed by J. Walter Ruben. Robert Benchley was hired to write the original screenplay, but Selznick replaced him with Rowland Lee in October 1934. The production was shelved for numerous months, until it was put on the schedule again in August 1935.

In preparation, Montgomery visited the original location of the story to "catch the true spirit" and visited "tailor after tailor" for Piccadilly clothes, to wear in the film. Casting and crew assignings resumed until May 1936.

== Reception ==
Piccadilly Jim opened to positive reviews, and the film became a moderate success, but soon descended into obscurity due to MGM's refusal to promote the film.

== Box office ==
The film grossed a total (domestic and foreign) of $1,272,000: $769,000 from the US and Canada and $503,000 elsewhere. It made a profit of $375,000.
