= Whispering Smith Rides =

1927 film

- Directed by: Ray Taylor
- Written by: Arthur Henry Gooden (screenplay); Frank H. Spearman (novel)
- Starring: Wallace MacDonald; Rose Blossom
- Distributed by: Universal Pictures
- Release date: June 6, 1927
- Country: United States
- Languages: Silent; English intertitles

Whispering Smith Rides is a 1927 American silent Western film serial directed by Ray Taylor. The screenplay was written by Arthur Henry Gooden, based on a novel by Frank H. Spearman. The film is considered to be lost, but a trailer is held for this serial at the Library of Congress.

== Cast ==
- Wallace MacDonald as Whispering Smith
- Rose Blossom
- J. P. McGowan
- Clark Comstock
- Henry Hebert
- Merrill McCormick (as W.M. McCormick)
- Harry Todd
- Willie Fung
- Frank Ellis

== Chapter titles ==
1. Lawless Men
2. Caught in the Crash
3. Trapped
4. The Ambush
5. Railroad Gold
6. The Interrupted Wedding
7. A Coward of Conscience
8. The Bandit’s Bargain
9. The Trail of Sacrifice
10. A Call of the Hear

_{Source:}

== See also ==
- List of film serials
- List of film serials by studio
