= White Flannels =

1927 film

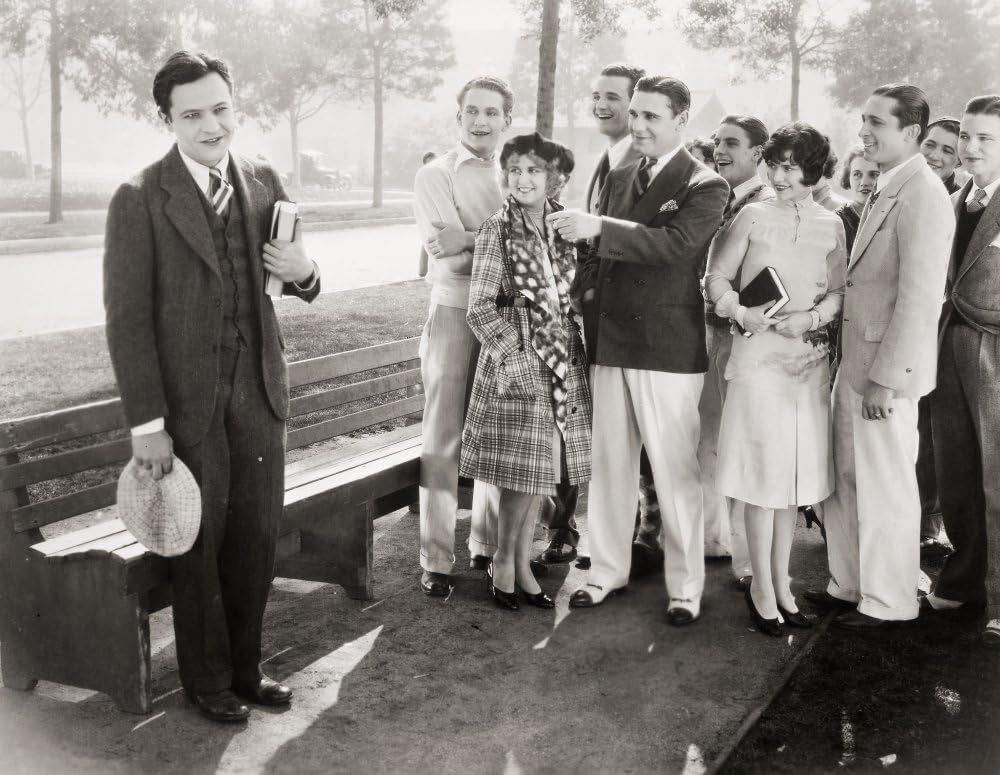
- Scene from the film
- Directed by: Lloyd Bacon
- Screenplay by: C. Graham Baker
- Based on: White Flannels by Lucian Cary
- Starring: Louise Dresser; Jason Robards Sr. Virginia Brown Faire; Warner Richmond; George Nichols; Brooks Benedict
- Cinematography: Edwin B. DuPar
- Production company: Warner Bros.
- Distributed by: Warner Bros.
- Release date: March 19, 1927
- Running time: 70 minutes
- Country: United States
- Language: English

White Flannels is a lost 1927 American drama film directed by Lloyd Bacon and starring Louise Dresser, Jason Robards Sr., Virginia Brown Faire, Warner Richmond, George Nichols and Brooks Benedict. It was written by C. Graham Baker. The film was released by Warner Bros. on March 19, 1927.

== Cast ==
- Louise Dresser as Mrs. Jacob Politz
- Jason Robards Sr. as Frank Politz
- Virginia Brown Faire as Anne
- Warner Richmond as Ed
- George Nichols as Jacob Politz
- Brooks Benedict as Paul
- Rose Blossom as Berenice Nolden
- Rosemary Cooper as Paul's Sister
