= Laddie Be Good =

1928 film

- Directed by: Bennett Cohen
- Written by: Bill Cody; L. V. Jefferson; Delos Sutherland
- Produced by: Bill Cody
- Starring: Bill Cody; Rose Blossom; George Bunny
- Edited by: Fred Burnworth
- Production company: Bill Cody Productions
- Distributed by: Pathé Exchange
- Release date: January 1, 1928
- Country: United States
- Languages: Silent; English intertitles

Laddie Be Good is a 1928 American silent comedy Western film directed by Bennett Cohen and starring Bill Cody, Rose Blossom and George Bunny.

== Cast ==
- Bill Cody as himself
- Rose Blossom as Ruth Jones
- George Bunny as Pierpont Jones
- Henry Hebert as John Norton
- Fred Gamble as Henry Cody
