= Mine to Keep =

1923 film

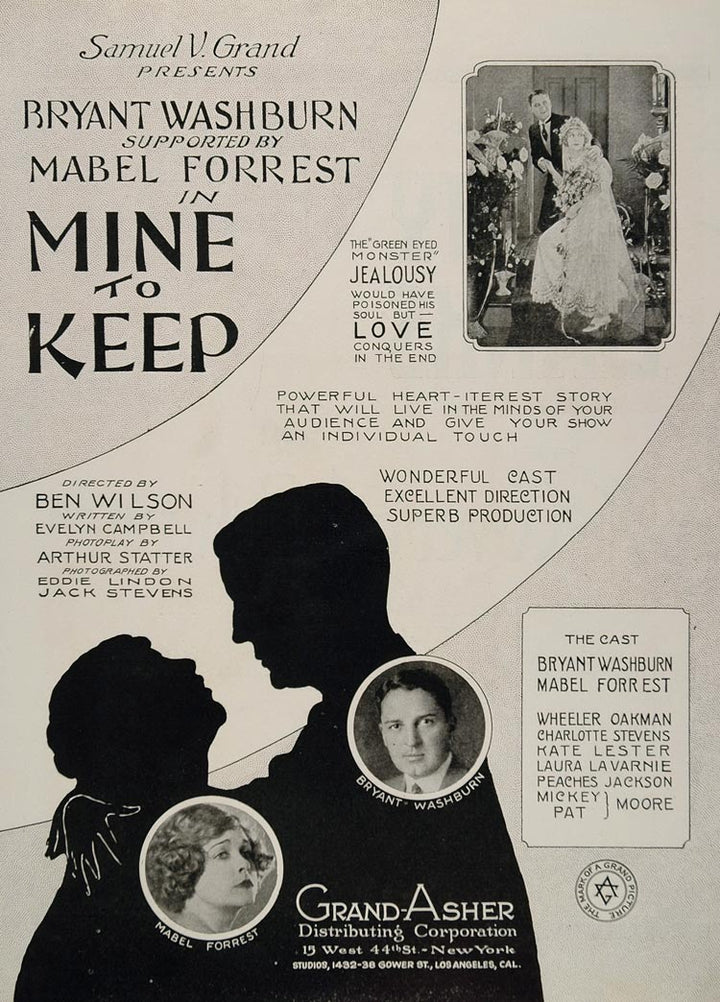
- Directed by: Ben F. Wilson
- Written by: Evelyn Campbell; Arthur F. Statter
- Produced by: Ben F. Wilson; Ben F. Wilson
- Starring: Bryant Washburn; Charlotte Stevens; Wheeler Oakman
- Cinematography: Edward Linden; Jack Stevens
- Production company: Bryant Washburn Productions
- Distributed by: Grand Asher Distributing Corporation
- Release date: August 20, 1923
- Running time: 60 minutes
- Country: United States
- Languages: Silent; English intertitles

Mine to Keep is a 1923 American silent drama film directed by Ben F. Wilson and starring Bryant Washburn, Charlotte Stevens and Wheeler Oakman.

== Plot ==
A newly married couple both suspect the other of infidelity. They separate and she goes to nurse the injured dancer she believes her husband had an affair with. Ultimately all turns out well and the couple reconcile.

== Cast ==
- Bryant Washburn as Victor Olney
- Mabel Forrest as Constance Rives
- Wheeler Oakman as Clint Mowbray
- Charlotte Stevens as Carmen Joy
- Laura La Varnie as Mrs. Joy
- Peaches Jackson as Joy child
- Michael D. Moore as Joy child
- Pat Moore as Joy child
- Francis Ford as Jack Deering
- Harry Dunkinson as Sewell
- Charles Mason as Pelton
- Edith Stayart as Mrs. Deering

== Bibliography ==
- Connelly, Robert B. The Silents: Silent Feature Films, 1910-36, Volume 40, Issue 2. December Press, 1998.
- Munden, Kenneth White. The American Film Institute Catalog of Motion Pictures Produced in the United States, Part 1. University of California Press, 1997.
