= Sue Sally Hale =

American polo player (1937–2003)

Personal information
- Born: Susan Sally Hale; 23 August 1937 Los Angeles, California, U.S.
- Died: 29 April 2003 (aged 65) Coachella, California, U.S.
- Occupation(s): Polo player, coach, trainer
- Spouse: Alex Hale (m. 1957; div. 1976)
- Children: 5
- Website: sshale.com

Sue Sally Hale (23 August 1937 – 29 April 2003) was an American polo player, coach and trainer who became the first woman admitted to the United States Polo Association (USPA) in 1972.

== Early life ==
Hale was born in Los Angeles to screenwriter Grover Jones and ballerina Susan Avery. Her father died when she was a child, and her mother later married actor and stuntman Richard Talmadge. She began riding horses at an early age and developed an interest in polo as a young girl watching matches near her home. Because official tournaments excluded women Hale competed for nearly two decades disguised as a man. She played matches using the name "A. Jones," using makeup and clothing to disguise her gender.

== Polo career ==
Hale repeatedly sought admission to the USPA and succeeded in 1972, becoming its first female member. She later trained numerous players and ponies in California and Texas and was named one of the "20 legends of the game" by Polo magazine. Hale also coached teams at Cal Poly San Luis Obispo and the Marine Corps Air Station El Toro. In 1990 she won the inaugural United States Women's Open with her daughters Sunny and Stormie Hale and French player Caroline Anier.

== Later life and death ==
Hale continued to promote women’s polo and organized tournaments nationwide. She died aged 65 of a ruptured aorta at her ranch in Coachella, California. She was survived by her children, including Sunset "Sunny" Hale (1968-2017), who became a leading women's polo player in her own right.
