= Frank H. Spearman =

American novelist (1859–1937)

Frank Hamilton Spearman
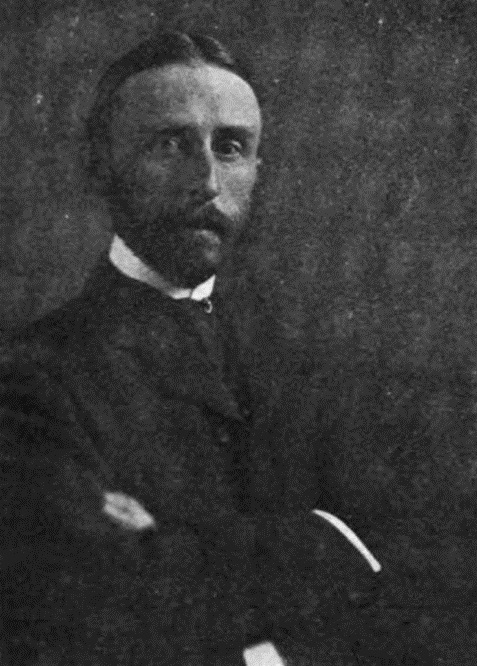
- Frank H. Spearman
- Born: 6 September 1859; Buffalo, New York
- Died: 29 December 1937 (aged 78); Hollywood, Los Angeles
- Resting place: Calvary Cemetery (Los Angeles)
- Citizenship: American
- Occupation: novelist
- Spouse: Eugenie Amelia Spearman née Lonergan (1884–1937)
- Children: Frank Spearman Jr., Thomas Clarke, Thomas Lonergan, Eugene Lonergan, Arthur Dunning, Elaine Emiline
- Writing career
- Language: English
- Genre: Western fiction
- Notable awards: Laetare Medal
- Website: frankhspearman.wordpress.com

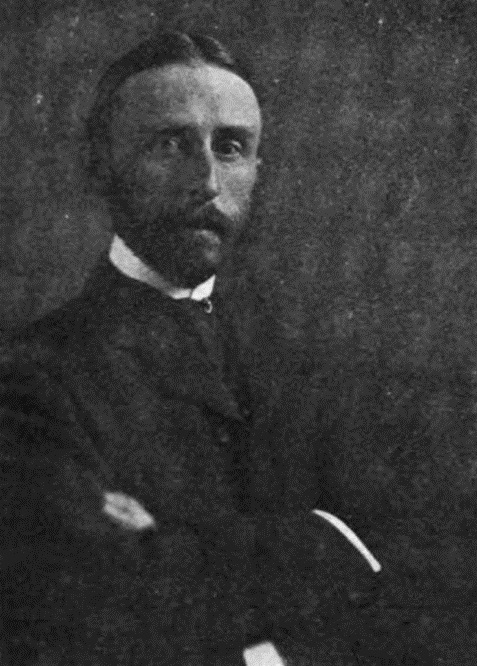
Frank H. Spearman

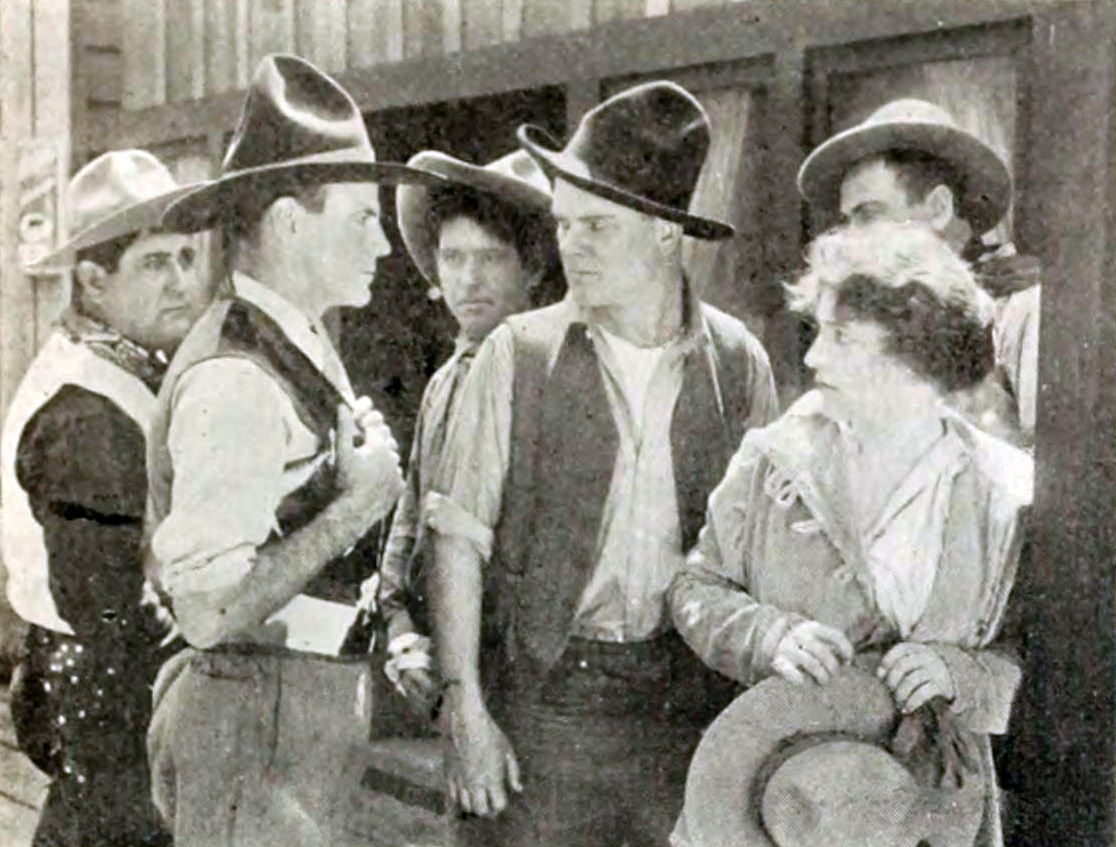
Whispering Smith (1916 film)

Frank Hamilton Spearman (September 6, 1859 – December 29, 1937) was an American writer.

== Career overview ==
Spearman was known for his books in the Western fiction genre and especially for his fiction and non-fiction works on the topic of railroads. The books were illustrated by leading artists, such as N. C. Wyeth for Whispering Smith.

Although he wrote prolifically about railroads, his actual career was that of a bank president in McCook, Nebraska, and did not himself work for a railroad. Spearman was also a devout Roman Catholic convert and held political views best described as proto-Libertarian, both of which beliefs are also reflected in his novels.

His western novel Whispering Smith—the title character of which was modeled on real-life Union Pacific Railroad detectives Timothy Keliher and Joe Lefors (though the name of the titular hero was apparently derived from another UPRR policeman, James L. "Whispering" Smith)—was made into a movie on eight separate occasions, four silent films in 1916, 1917, 1926, and 1927, with later versions in 1930, 1935, 1948, and 1952. There was also a TV series in 1961.

Most of his novels have been reprinted frequently. For example, The Paper Tiger press brought out reprints in 1996, complete with the original illustrations.

== Bibliography ==
- The Nerve of Foley (1900)
- Held for Orders (1901)
- Doctor Bryson (1902)
- The Daughter of a Magnate (1903), ISBN 1-889439-01-0
- The Close of the Day (1904)
- The Strategy of Great Railroads (1904)
- Whispering Smith (1906), ISBN 1-889439-02-9
- Robert Kimberly (1911)
- The Mountain Divide (1912)
- Merrilie Dawes (1913)
- Nan of Music Mountain (1916), ISBN 1-889439-03-7
- Laramie Holds the Range (1921)
- The Marriage Verdict (1923)
- Selwood of Sleepy Cat (1924)
- Your Son's Education (1925)
- Flambeau Jim (1927)
- Spanish Lover (1930)
- Hell's Desert (1932)
- Gunlock Ranch (1935)
- Carmen Of The Rancho (1937)
