= A Girl Named Mary =

1919 film by Walter Edwards

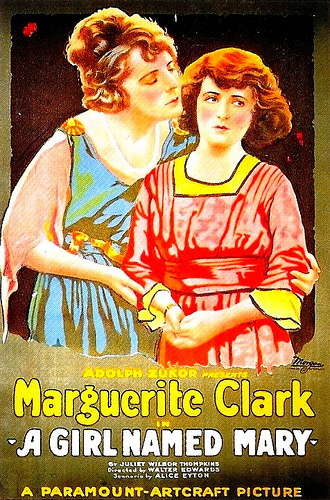
- Film Poster
- Directed by: Walter Edwards
- Written by: Alice Eyton (scenario)
- Based on: A Girl Named Mary by Juliet Wilbor Tompkins
- Starring: Marguerite Clark
- Cinematography: William Marshall
- Production company: Famous Players–Lasky
- Distributed by: Paramount Pictures/Artcraft
- Release date: December 21, 1919
- Running time: 50 minutes
- Country: United States
- Language: Silent (English intertitles)

A Girl Named Mary is a 1919 American silent romantic drama film produced by Famous Players–Lasky and distributed by Paramount Pictures. Directed by Walter Edwards, the film is based on the novel of the same name by Juliet Wilbor Tompkins and stars Marguerite Clark. The film is now presumed to be lost.

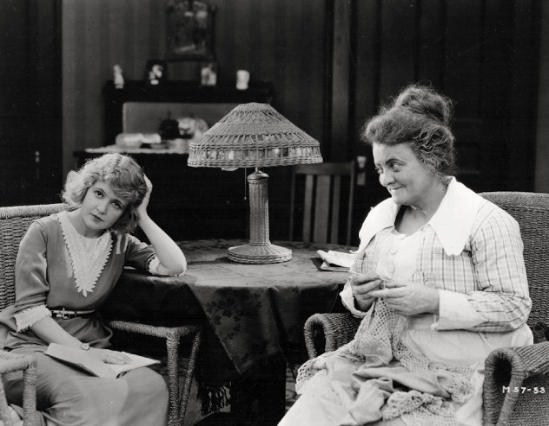
Marguerite Clark and Aggie Herring.

== Plot ==
As described in a film magazine, the widow Marisse Jaffrey has searched the country over for her daughter Mary, who was taken from her when an infant. She becomes interested in Mary Healey, a stenographer, and investigates her home conditions. She meets Mrs. Healey, who believes Mary is her niece, although she has raised Mary to believe she is her daughter. When it is revealed that Mary is the missing daughter, complications arise from her unwillingness to leave the woman she believes is her mother. However, in the end satisfactory arrangements are made for the happiness of all.

== Cast ==
- Marguerite Clark as Mary Healey
- Kathlyn Williams as Mrs. Jaffrey
- Wallace MacDonald as Henry Martin
- Aggie Herring as Mrs. Healey
- Charles Clary as Hugh Le Baron
- Lillian Leighton as Hannah
- Pauline Pulliam as May Laguna
- A. Edward Sutherland as Mr. Peavy
- Helene Sullivan as Mona Molloy
