= Alice Eyton =

New Zealand screenwriter (1874–1929)

- Born: Alice Rose Eyton; 8 June 1874; Hokitika, New Zealand
- Died: 3 November 1929 (aged 55); Pasadena, California, US
- Occupation(s): Screenwriter, novelist, playwright
- Spouse: Robert von Saxmar
- Relatives: Charles Eyton (brother); Kathlyn Williams (sister-in-law); Vera Doria (sister)

Alice Eyton (8 June 1874 – 3 November 1929), sometimes credited under her married name Alice von Saxmar, was a New Zealand–born journalist, screenwriter, playwright, and novelist active in Hollywood between 1918 and 1922.

== Biography ==
=== Origins ===
The third of five children, Eyton was born in Hokitika, South Island, New Zealand, to journalist Robert Henry Eyton (–1885) and Eleanor Maud Eyton (née Fosbery). Eyton's father died when she was young. Her brother, Charles Eyton, became a prominent actor and producer in Hollywood; her sister, Vera, become an American actress.

By 1900, Eyton had already had a number of short stories published in New Zealand and Australia, under such titles as 'Behind the hills', 'Queen Empress and the cotter's wife', 'Down by the sea wall', 'Woman in the clutches of the law: At the gaols', and 'The girl he left behind him: An incident of the Transvaal war'.

In January 1901, along with many of the Sydney Bohemian set such as sculptor Nelson Illingworth, writer Louise Mack, and poet Banjo Paterson, she attended the farewell dinner of Scottish-Australian poet and bush balladeer Will H. Ogilvie (1869–1963). Following her own testimonial dinner, in February 1902, Eyton travelled to London on board P&O's RMS Arcadia.

=== Hollywood career ===
She moved to Hollywood, California, by 1905, where she continued her literary efforts. By April 1909, Eyton's first play, based on Victor Cherbuliez's 1877 novel Samuel Brohl et cie, was accepted for production in New York City.

She married fellow writer Robert von Saxmar around 1920 in Los Angeles, where she found work as a stenographer at Paramount. After working her way up the ranks, she earned a spot on the studio's writing staff; her first known credit was on 1918's A Girl Named Mary. She wrote over a dozen scripts in the ensuing five years. By June 1921 she was listed as a writer for the Realart company.

=== Death ===
Eyton died of burns sustained when her Halloween costume caught fire at a party being held in Pasadena, California. The party was being held in a cabin in Arroyo Seco, where she was temporarily residing while working on a novel; a lit match or cigarette somehow landed on Eyton's cotton snow maiden costume, which quickly went up in flames. She was rushed to the nearby Pasadena Hospital, but her burns were fatal.

== Selected filmography ==
- Tillie (1922)
- Two Weeks with Pay (1921)
- The Snob (1921)
- Her Beloved Villain (1920)
- A Full House (1920)
- A Lady in Love (1920)
- The Thirteenth Commandment (1920)
- Luck in Pawn (1919)
- Louisiana (1919)
- Girls (1919)
- Happiness a la Mode (1919)
- Little Comrade (1919)
- Experimental Marriage (1919)
- A Girl Named Mary (1918)
