= The Merry Cavalier =

1926 silent film

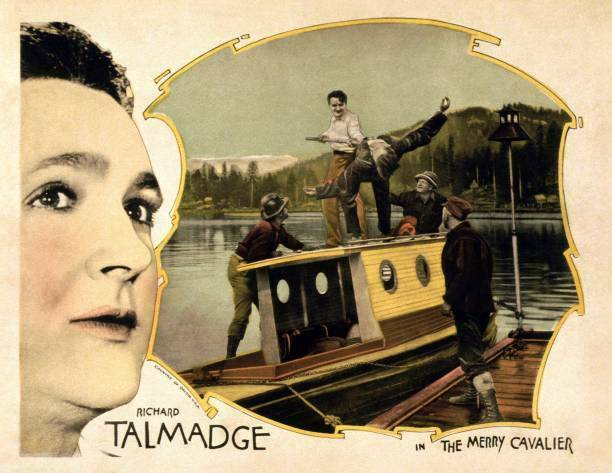
- Directed by: Noel M. Smith
- Written by: Grover Jones
- Starring: Richard Talmadge; Charlotte Stevens; William H. Tooker
- Cinematography: Jack Stevens
- Production companies: Richard Talmadge Productions; Truart Film Corporation
- Distributed by: Film Booking Offices of America; Ideal Films (UK)
- Release date: August 29, 1926
- Running time: 50 minutes
- Country: United States
- Languages: Silent; English intertitles

The Merry Cavalier is a 1926 American silent drama film directed by Noel M. Smith and starring Richard Talmadge, Charlotte Stevens and William H. Tooker.

== Cast ==
- Richard Talmadge as Dick Hemper
- Charlotte Stevens as Nan Cosgrove
- William H. Tooker as Dave Hemper
- Joseph Harrington as Luke Cosgrove
- Broderick O'Farrell as Physician
- Jack Richardson as Mel Bronson

== Bibliography ==
- Munden, Kenneth White. The American Film Institute Catalog of Motion Pictures Produced in the United States, Part 1. University of California Press, 1997.
