= Rose Blossom =

American actress (1905–1984)

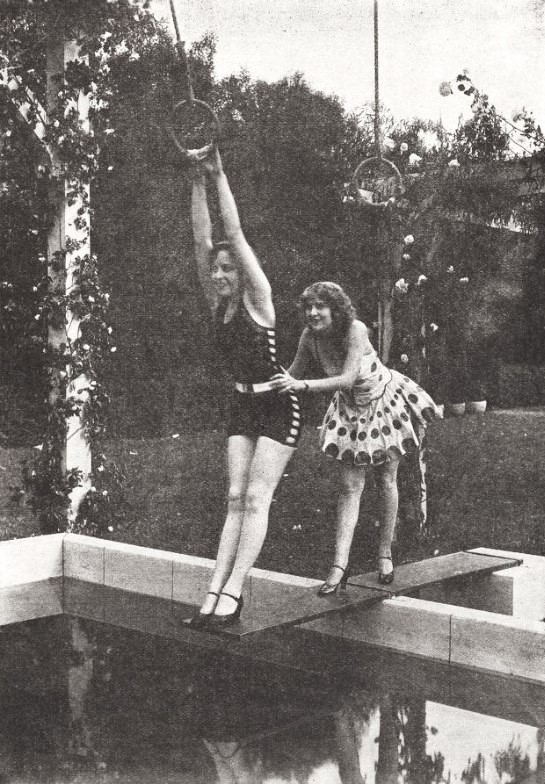
- Lola Todd and Rose Blossom in 1926
- Born: Blossom Breneman; March 14, 1905; St. Louis, Missouri, U.S.
- Died: October, 1984 (age 79); Phoenix, Arizona, U.S.
- Education: Washington University in St. Louis
- Occupation: Actress
- Spouse: William Medart (div.)

Rose Blossom (born Blossom Breneman, and sometimes credited as Donal Blossom) was an American actress active during Hollywood's silent film era. She was a contract player at MGM, and she often appeared as a cowgirl. She was the leading lady in the Buck Jones film The Gentle Cyclone. She was noted for her short stature and slight build.

== Biography ==
Blossom was born in St. Louis, Missouri, and was the daughter of Edward Breneman and Bessie Parker. She graduated from Kirkwood High School at the age of 16 in 1922, and studied art for two years at Washington University in St. Louis before she moved to New York City to pursue a career as an actress. After appearing in several films shot in New York in 1925, she moved to Hollywood and appeared in a string of films, sometimes as the leading lady.

On October 10, 1928, she married golfer and restaurateur William Sherman Medart, and they had a child together, although they separated soon afterward. They later reconciled, going into business together and gaining fame for their St. Louis hamburger stand, The Cottage, by the early 1930s, and later a restaurant called Bill Medart's. The secret to their reconciliation: She agreed to give up acting, and he agreed to give up golf. The couple had three children before the marriage ended when Medart died in a fall from a hotel window in Paris. His death was ruled a suicide by a coroner.

== Filmography ==
- I'll Tell the World (1925) (uncredited)
- The Fool (1925)
- The Night Patrol (1926)
- The Gentle Cyclone (1926)
- Speed Cop (1926)
- Desert Greed (1926)
- White Flannels (1927)
- Lure of the Night Club (1927)
- Catch-As-Catch-Can (1927)
- Whispering Smith Rides (1927) (serial)
- Laddie Be Good (1928)
- The Bride of the Colorado (1928)
