= William Marshall (cinematographer) =

American cinematographer (1885–1943)

- Born: January 16, 1885; Ottoman Empire
- Died: April 25, 1943 (aged 58); Los Angeles, California, U.S.
- Other names: William C. Marshall; Wm. Marshall
- Occupation: Cinematographer
- Years active: 1916–1930

William C. Marshall (January 16, 1885 – April 25, 1943) was an Ottoman Empire-born American cinematographer. His career began in 1916 and ended in 1930. He served as cinematographer on the starring vehicles for such stars as Annette Kellerman, Marguerite Clark, Billie Burke, Elsie Ferguson, Wallace Reid, Rudolph Valentino, and Clara Bow. He died in Los Angeles in 1943 at age 58.

== Selected filmography ==
- Under Cover (1916)
- Daughter of the Gods (1916)
- The Fortunes of Fifi (1917)
- Shirley Kaye (1917)
- The Little Boy Scout (1917)
- Arms and the Girl (1917)
- The Danger Mark (1918)
- On the Quiet (1918)
- In Pursuit of Polly (1918)
- Little Miss Hoover (1918)
- The Whirlpool (1918)
- Secret Service (1919)
- Hawthorne of the U.S.A. (1919)
- A Girl Named Mary (1919)
- A Lady in Love (1920)
- Sweet Lavender (1920)
- Eyes of the Heart (1920)
- A Wise Fool (1921)
- The Sheik (1921)
- Moran of the Lady Letty (1922)
- The Ghost Breaker (1922)
- Lights Out (1923)
- Itching Palms (1923)
- On Time (1924)
- Stepping Lively (1924)
- Laughing at Danger (1924)
- American Manners (1924)
- In Fast Company (1924)
- The Prince of Pep (1925)
- The Wall Street Whiz (1925)
- Youth and Adventure (1925)
- Jimmie's Millions (1925)
- Tearing Through (1925)
- Flaming Waters (1925)
- Stranded in Paris (1926)
- Wedding Bills (1927)
- Hula (1927)
- Senorita (1927)
- Fools for Luck (1928)
- Hot News (1928)
- Temptation (1930)
