= The Prince of Pep =

1925 film by Jack Nelson

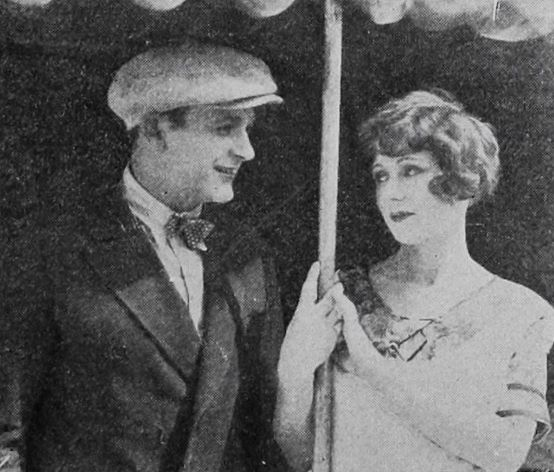
- Still with Talmadge and Luxford
- Directed by: Jack Nelson
- Written by: James Bell Smith (screen story, scenario)
- Produced by: A. Carlos
- Starring: Richard Talmadge
- Cinematography: William Marshall; Jack Stevens
- Edited by: Doane Harrison
- Production company: Truart Film Corporation
- Distributed by: Film Booking Offices of America
- Release date: December 20, 1925
- Running time: 5 reels
- Country: United States
- Language: Silent (English intertitles)

The Prince of Pep is a 1925 American silent romantic drama film directed by Jack Nelson and starring Richard Talmadge.

== Plot ==
As described in a film magazine review, a young doctor is struck on the head by his secretary and the injury causes him to forget his identity. He lives as a wharf tramp until he meets the daughter of another doctor and helps her and her father minister to the poor. Later he is struck on the head again and becomes aware of his identity. He also wins the affection of the young woman.

== Cast ==
- Richard Talmadge as Dr. James Leland
- Nola Luxford as Marion Nord
- Joseph Harrington as Dr. Nord
- Carol Wines as Ruth Wheeler
- Brinsley Shaw as Hugh Powell
- Victor Dillingham as Buck Sanders
- Arthur Conrad (actor) as Eddie-the-Stiff
- Marcella Daly as The Maid

== Preservation ==
Prints of The Prince of Pep are held by the Library of Congress, Cinematheque Royale de Belgique, and Academy Film Archive.
