= Arthur Conrad =

American actor

- Occupations: Actor; writer
- Known for: movie acting

Arthur Conrad was an American actor, known for The Night Patrol (1926) as "Terry the Rat," and The Prince of Pep (1925) as "Eddie-the-Sniff."

In the early 1900s, he was known for playing in comedy. He was described as an "excellent eccentric comedian" and a "remarkable dancer."

In August, 1925, Conrad was part of a cast in a play in New York.
