= A Lady in Love =

1920 film by Walter Edwards

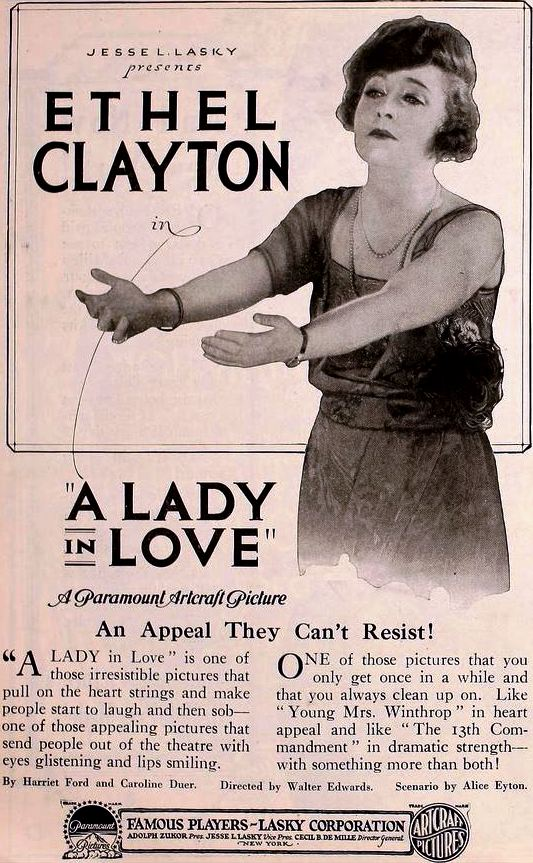
- Ad for film
- Directed by: Walter Edwards
- Screenplay by: Alice Eyton
- Based on: A Lady in Love by Harriet Ford and Caroline Duer
- Produced by: Jesse L. Lasky
- Starring: Ethel Clayton; Harrison Ford; Boyd Irwin; Clarence Geldart; Elsa Lorimer; Ernest Joy
- Cinematography: William Marshall
- Production companies: Artcraft Pictures Corporation; Famous Players–Lasky Corporation
- Distributed by: Paramount Pictures
- Release date: May 30, 1920
- Running time: 50 minutes
- Country: United States
- Language: Silent (English intertitles)

A Lady in Love is a 1920 American silent drama film directed by Walter Edwards and written by Alice Eyton based upon a play of the same name by Harriet Ford and Caroline Duer. The film stars Ethel Clayton, Harrison Ford, Boyd Irwin, Clarence Geldart, Elsa Lorimer, and Ernest Joy. The film was released on May 30, 1920, by Paramount Pictures. It is not known whether the film currently survives.

== Plot ==
As described in a film magazine, Barbara elopes from covenant school with Barton Sedgewick, the rascally younger brother of her guardian George Sedgewick. She soon discovers that Barton has another wife and child living. He also fears arrest for some frauds in which he was involved and flees the country. Barbara goes to live with George and his wife Clara. The latter has a secret admirer in Gilbert Rhodes, who is also a secret partner in Barton's crooked schemes. Barbara finds herself in love with a fine upstanding lawyer named Brent. When Barbara learns that Clara is planning to run away with Gilbert, she follows the woman to Rhodes' rooms and discovers Barton hiding there. She obtains evidence freeing herself from the marriage vows, which paves the future with happiness for her and Brent.

== Cast ==
- Ethel Clayton as Barbara Martin
- Harrison Ford as Brent
- Boyd Irwin as Barton Sedgewick
- Clarence Geldart as George Sedgewick
- Elsa Lorimer as Clara Sedgewick
- Ernest Joy as Gilbert Rhodes
- Ernee Goodleigh as Anna
- Frances Raymond as Mrs. Sedgewick
