= The Night Patrol =

1926 American silent crime film

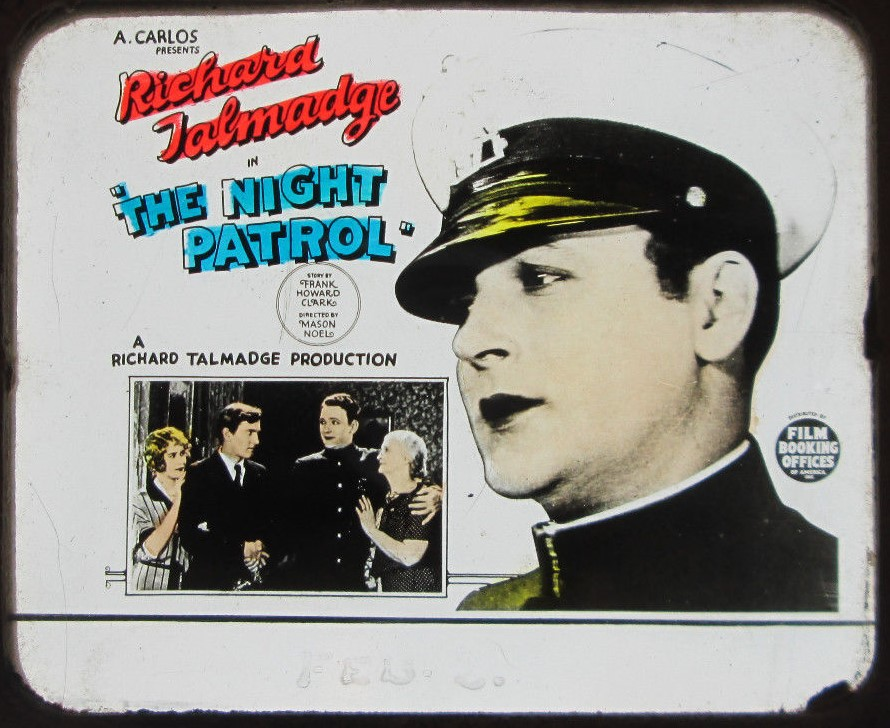
- Directed by: Noel M. Smith
- Written by: Frank Howard Clark
- Produced by: Richard Talmadge
- Starring: Richard Talmadge; Rose Blossom; Mary Carr
- Cinematography: Charles Lang; Jack Stevens
- Edited by: Doane Harrison
- Production companies: Carlos Productions; Truart Film Corporation
- Distributed by: Film Booking Offices of America
- Release date: March 14, 1926
- Running time: 60 minutes
- Country: United States
- Languages: Silent; English intertitles

The Night Patrol is a 1926 American silent crime film directed by Noel M. Smith and starring Richard Talmadge, Rose Blossom, and Mary Carr.

== Plot ==
As described in a film magazine review, Tom Collins, a Los Angeles policeman, in love with Louise Hollister, is compelled to arrest her brother Roy on a charge of killing police officer Britt. Louise turns against him. At his trial Roy is condemned to death for the killing. Tom runs down the actual guilty man and frustrates an attempt to rob banker John Pendleton's home. A storm breaks down telegraphic communication, and Tom makes a desperate ride to save Roy on the eve of his scheduled execution. He succeeds, and is promoted and wins back the affection of Louise.

== Cast ==
- Richard Talmadge as Tom Collins
- Rose Blossom as Louise Hollister
- Mary Carr as Mrs. Collins
- Gardner James as Roy Hollister
- Josef Swickard as John Pendleton
- Grace Darmond as Goldie Ferguson
- Victor Dillingham as Chuck Wolcott
- Arthur Conrad (actor) as Terry the Rat

== Preservation ==
A 35 mm copy of The Night Patrol is held by George Eastman House.

== Bibliography ==
- Brent E. Walker. Mack Sennett’s Fun Factory: A History and Filmography of His Studio and His Keystone and Mack Sennett Comedies, with Biographies of Players and Personnel. McFarland, 2013. ISBN 978-0786477111
