= Südalinna Theatre =

Theatre in Tallinn, Estonia

Coordinates: 59°25′56″N 24°44′41″E

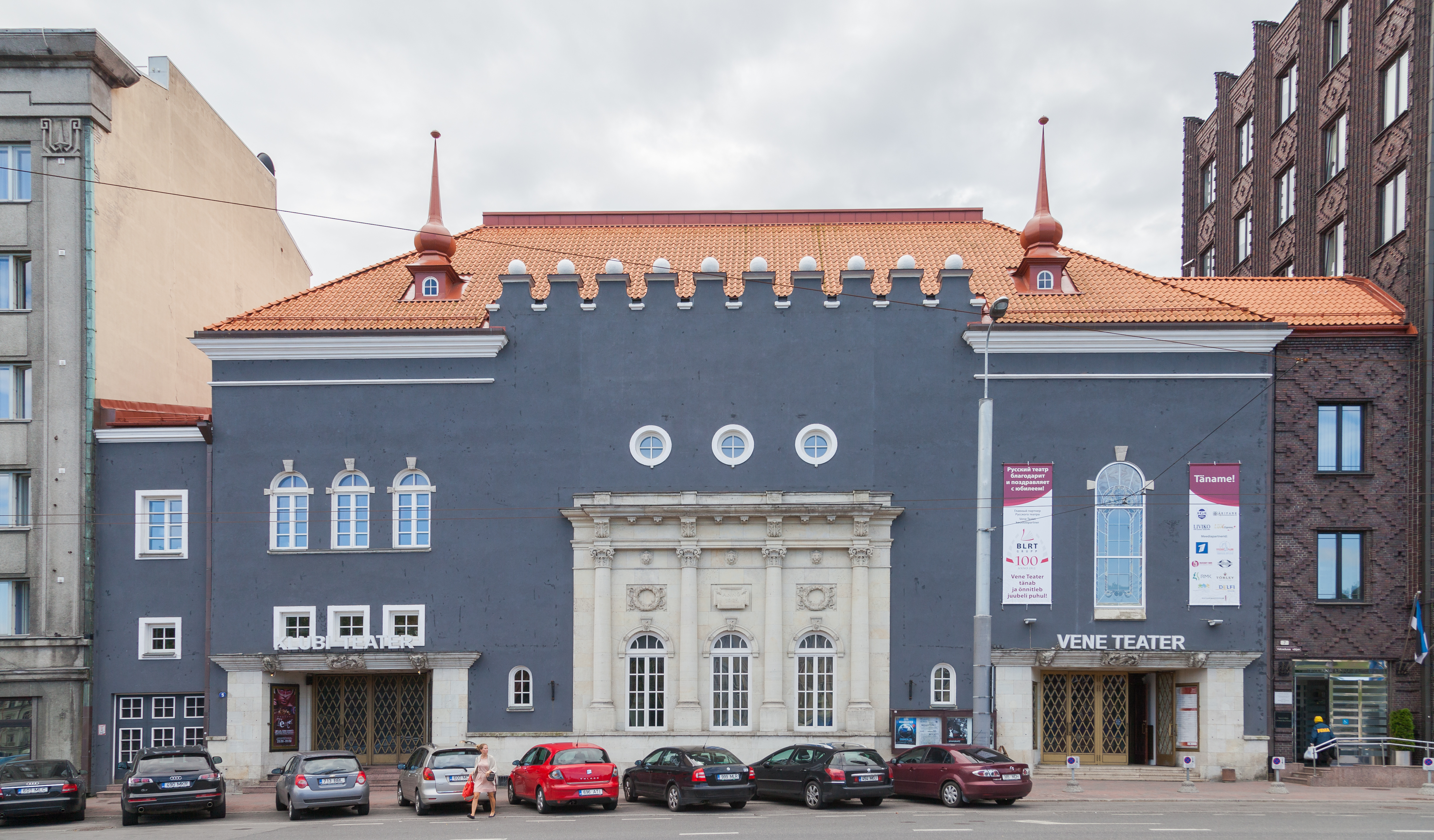
The former Russian Theatre in Tallinn

Südalinna Theatre, formerly the Russian Theatre (Russian: Русский театр Эстонии, Estonian: Vene Teater) is a Russian-language theatre in Tallinn, Estonia. It is housed in a building that was originally built as a cinema in 1926 and is in Art Deco style.

A small Russian theatre community has existed in Tallinn since the late 19th century; it grew following the Russian Revolution when Russian actors settled in Estonia as refugees. A permanent Russian-language theatre was not set up in the city until 1948, however. During the Soviet occupation of Estonia, it was one of several Russian-language theatres of the Soviet Union and also toured around the whole country. Since Estonia re-gained its independence, the theatre has focused more on a local audience.

The Russian theatre has put up both Russian-language classical plays by e.g. Anton Chekhov and Alexander Griboyedov as well as translations of plays from other languages, including Estonian plays in cooperation with Estonian-language directors.

From 1930, until its closure in 2005, a restaurant and casino named the Astoria (originally the "Dancing-Palace Gloria") existed in the building's basement.

The theatre was renamed as Südalinna Teater ("city centre theatre") in September 2025.

== See also ==
- German Theatre in Tallinn
