= Piccadilly Jim =

1917 novel by P. G. Wodehouse

- First UK edition
- Author: P. G. Wodehouse
- Language: English
- Publisher: Dodd, Mead and Company (US); Herbert Jenkins (UK)
- Publication date: 24 February 1917 (US); May 1918 (UK)
- Publication place: United States
- Media type: Print

Piccadilly Jim is a novel by P. G. Wodehouse, first published in the United States on 24 February 1917 by Dodd, Mead and Company, New York, and in the United Kingdom in May 1918 by Herbert Jenkins, London. The story had previously appeared in the US in the Saturday Evening Post between 16 September and 11 November 1916.

The novel features Ogden Ford and his mother Nesta, both previously encountered in The Little Nugget (1913). Nesta has remarried the diffident, baseball-loving millionaire Mr Peter Pett, and Ogden remains spoilt and obnoxious. The story takes its title from the charismatic character of James "Jimmy" Crocker, Nesta's nephew and a reforming playboy. 'Jim' is called upon to assist in the kidnapping of Ogden, amongst much confusion involving imposters, crooks, detectives, butlers, aunts etc. – all in the name of romance.

== Plot ==
Financier Peter Pett lives in a New York mansion with his formidable wife, crime novelist Nesta Ford Pett, his step-son, the stout and ill-behaved fourteen-year-old Ogden Ford, and his niece, the strong-willed Ann Chester. Mr Pett sees an article in the New York Sunday Chronicle about Mrs Pett's 21-year-old nephew, James Braithwaite Crocker, a wild young man called "Piccadilly Jim" who is currently in London but used to work for the Chronicle. Mrs Pett decides the family will go to London to bring Jimmy back and keep him under control in New York. Ann does not like Jimmy, because five years prior, Ann wrote a book of poetry and Jimmy interviewed her about it for the Chronicle, but made a joke of her poems and the interview in his article. Ogden behaves rudely to Mr Pett and Jerry Mitchell, Mr Pett's fitness trainer. Ann suggests to Jerry that they kidnap Ogden and send him to the pet hospital run by Mitchell's friend Smithers, who cures sick dogs with a regimen of a healthy diet and exercise. She believes the same treatment would reform Ogden.

In London, Nesta's sister Eugenia, who inherited a fortune from her first husband, and Eugenia's husband Bingley Crocker, who was a penniless actor before marrying Eugenia, reside at their fashionable residence, Drexdale House. Jimmy Crocker is Bingley's son and Eugenia's step-son. Nesta claims Eugenia married beneath her, so Eugenia wants to have Bingley made a lord. Bingley would rather return to America to see baseball games, but Eugenia does not want Bingley to leave England until he has been made a peer. Bingley commits a gaffe by opening the front door for the Pett family, instead of waiting for the butler Bayliss to do so, and covers this up by pretending to be the butler. He and Mr Pett bond over their love of baseball, and Pett says he would gladly hire him. Nesta argues that Jimmy should be sent to New York, though Eugenia dismisses the idea.

Jimmy wakes with a hangover, and learns from Bayliss about a newspaper report which shows that Jimmy got into a fight with an influential young man, Lord Percy Whipple. This will delay Eugenia's goal of making Bingley a lord, which upsets Bingley. This makes Jimmy feel guilty about his behaviour. Jimmy decides to go to America to save his father any more trouble, and explains this to him in a letter. He sees the beautiful Ann Chester, who is returning to America along with her family. They do not recognize each other. She clearly dislikes Jimmy Crocker, so he pretends to be Algernon Bayliss, son of the butler Bayliss.

Back in New York, Nesta Pett hosts a party, where Jimmy's friend Lord Wisbeach is present, as well as the Pett family's new butler, Skinner, who is actually Bingley Crocker. Lord Wisbeach warns Mrs Pett to safeguard the explosive powder called Partridgite invented by her nephew Willie Partridge. Mitchell is pushed too far by Ogden and hits him, and Nesta Pett fires Mitchell. Jimmy volunteers to take Mitchell's place in Ann's kidnapping scheme for her, and is welcomed into the Pett household under his real name, though he still pretends he is not Jimmy to Ann. He plays along with his father being the butler, and also pretends to recognize Lord Wisbeach, though he realizes the man is an imposter. After Jimmy learns that the imposter, alias Gentleman Jack, is after the Patridgite, the so-called Lord Wisbeach tells Mrs Pett that Jimmy and Skinner are imposters. Mrs Pett hires a tough detective, Miss Trimble.

Ogden makes a deal with Jimmy to be kidnapped and receive half the ransom. Jimmy remembers he mocked Ann's poetry, and keeps his identity secret. He confesses his love for her, but she has agreed to marry Lord Wisbeach. Bingley tells Jimmy he came to New York because of his homesickness and Jimmy's letter, and left a note for Eugenia saying it was for a vacation. Jimmy discovers Lord Wisbeach stealing the Partridgite. The thief sets off the powder, but it does nothing, and he flees. Miss Trimble asks questions, and Jimmy reveals the whole truth to everyone. The kidnapping plan fails, though Mr Pett insists to Mrs Pett that Ogden be sent to a boarding school. Eugenia Crocker appears and says that Bingley will soon be made a lord, since Lord Percy Whipple respects Jimmy. Jimmy stays in New York to work for Mr Pett. Ann agrees to bury the past and marry Jimmy.

== Publication history ==
The early US edition of Piccadilly Jim included a frontispiece and seven inserted illustrations drawn by May Wilson Preston, who had illustrated the story in the Saturday Evening Post. Wodehouse dedicated the US edition of the novel to his step-daughter Leonora: "To my step-daughter Lenora [sic], conservatively speaking the most wonderful child on earth".

The UK edition was the first novel written by Wodehouse to be published by Herbert Jenkins. The book was also the first of Wodehouse's novels to be translated into a foreign language, Swedish. Published in 1920 in Stockholm, it was translated into Swedish by Hanny Flygare.

An excerpt from the novel was included in the 1977 anthology Benny Green's The Cricket Addict's Archive, along with an excerpt from another Wodehouse novel, Psmith in the City.

== Adaptations ==
The novel was adapted as a play in 1918 by Guy Bolton.

Piccadilly Jim has been adapted as a film three times. In the 1919 film, Jimmy Crocker was played by Owen Moore. In the 1936 film, he was played by Robert Montgomery. In the 2004 film, he was played by Sam Rockwell.
