= Laughing at Danger (1924 film) =

1924 film

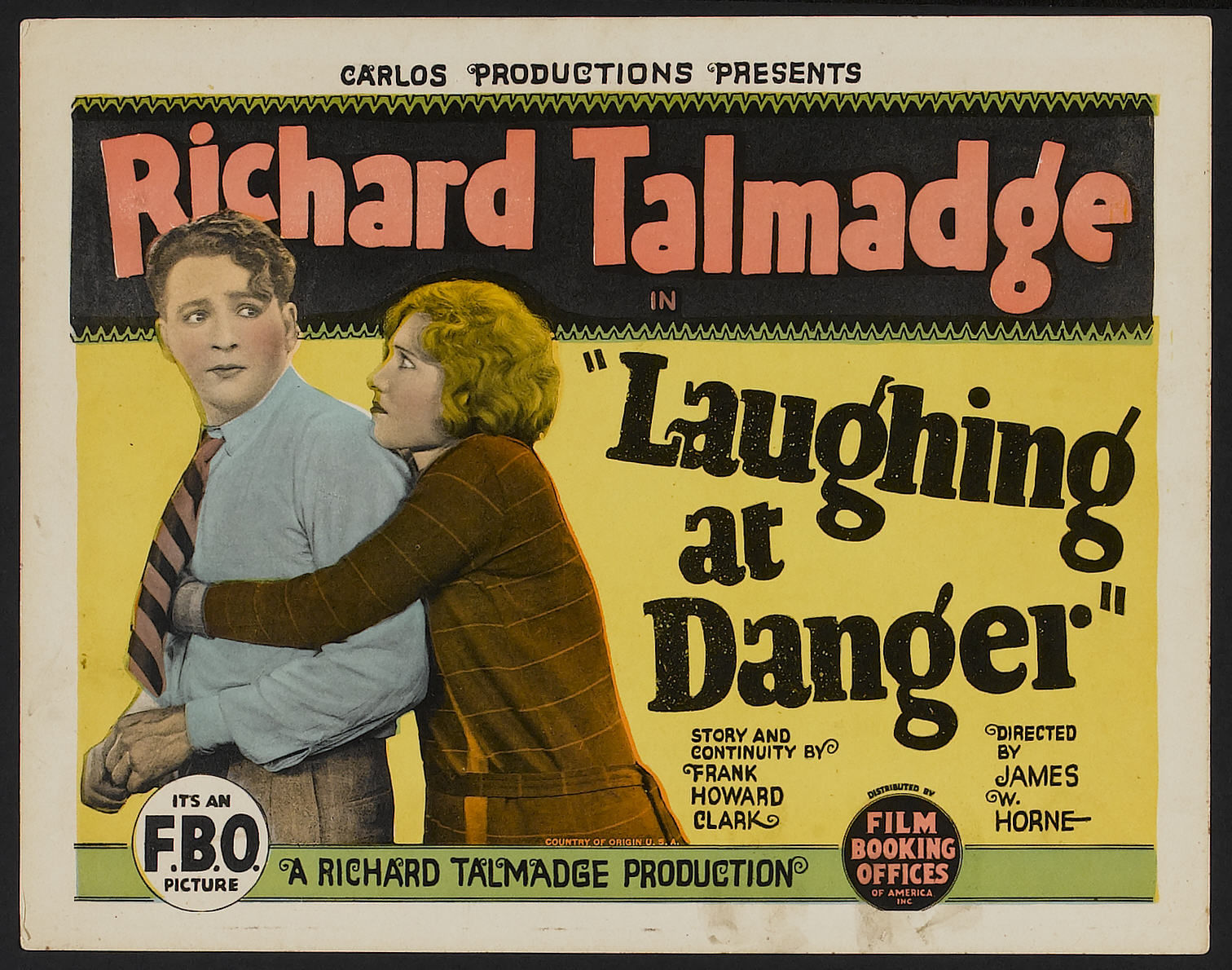
- Lobby card
- Directed by: James W. Horne
- Written by: Frank Howard Clark
- Starring: Richard Talmadge; Joseph W. Girard; Eva Novak
- Cinematography: William Marshall
- Production companies: Carlos Productions; Truart Film Corporation
- Distributed by: Film Booking Offices of America
- Release date: November 23, 1924
- Running time: 54 minutes
- Country: United States
- Language: Silent (English intertitles)

Laughing at Danger is a 1924 American silent action film directed by James W. Horne and starring Richard Talmadge, Joseph W. Girard, and Eva Novak.

== Plot ==
As described in a review in a film magazine, a love affair makes Alan Remington (Talmadge) dissatisfied with life. Trying to lift his son out of despondency, his father Cyrus (Girard) devises various means of excitement. Crooks seek to steal a death ray machine which the elder Remington is sponsoring and circumstance involves Alan in the subsequent excitement. Thinking it is only a trick of his father's, he takes danger lightly. The inventor Professor Leo Hollister (Harrington) and his daughter Carolyn (Novak) are captured and, with the machine, imprisoned in a hut on a lonely hill. Alan goes to the rescue. Naval vessels are warned that the desperadoes intend to blow them up with the death ray and turn their guns on the hut and destroy it. Alan leaps to safety in the nick of time.

== Cast ==
- Richard Talmadge as Alan Remington
- Joseph W. Girard as Cyrus Remington
- Joseph Harrington as Professor Leo Hollister
- Eva Novak as Carolyn Hollister
- Stanhope Wheatcroft as Darwin Kershaw
- Bull Montana as Killer Murphy

== Preservation ==
Prints of Laughing at Danger are held in the collections of the Gosfilmofond in Moscow and the UCLA Film & Television Archive.

== Bibliography ==
- Munden, Kenneth White. The American Film Institute Catalog of Motion Pictures Produced in the United States, Part 1. University of California Press, 1997.
