= Juliet Wilbor Tompkins =

American writer and magazine editor (1871–1956)

Juliet Wilbor Tompkins (May 13, 1871 – January 29, 1956) was an American writer and editor.

Juliet Wilbor Tompkins was born on May 13, 1871, in Oakland, California, to Sarah (Haight) and Edward Tompkins. She received an AB from Vassar College in 1891.

Tompkins was an associate editor at Munsey's Magazine from 1897 to 1901. Around 1898, Frank Munsey appointed her the editor of Puritan, another of his magazines; she remained editor until 1901. She also edited a magazine called The Wave.

She published 14 novels and many short stories. According to Richard Ohmann, Tompkins's story "On the Way North", published in Munsey's in 1895, exemplifies the perspective of the professional–managerial class. A review in the Brooklyn Eagle called the novel Open House (1909), about a psychiatrist who runs a facility to which he invites "derelicts", a "very laughable, perverse book". The film A Girl Named Mary (1919) was based on Tompkins's 1918 novel of the same name.

Tompkins married Emery Pottle either in 1897 or on November 22, 1904, and filed for divorce on March 24, 1905. She died on January 29, 1956, in New York City.

== Publications ==
- Dr. Ellen (1908)
- Open House (1909)
- Mothers and Fathers (1910)
- The Top of the Morning (1910)
- Pleasures and Palaces: Being the Home-Making Adventures of Marie Rose (1912)
- Ever After (1913)
- Diantha (1915)
- The Seed of the Righteous (1916)
- At the Sign of the Oldest House (1917)
- A Girl Named Mary (1918)
- The Starting (1919)
- Joanna Builds a Nest (1920)
- A Line a Day (1923)
- The Millionaire (1930)
