= Marry the Girl (1928 film) =

1928 film by Phil Rosen

- Directed by: Phil Rosen
- Screenplay by: Frances Guihan (screenplay); Wyndham Gittens (story)
- Produced by: Joe Rock
- Starring: Barbara Bedford; Robert Ellis; DeWitt Jennings
- Cinematography: Herbert Kirkpatrick
- Edited by: Leotta Whytock
- Distributed by: Sterling Pictures
- Release date: March 1, 1928 (USA)

Marry the Girl (released in Europe as The House of Deceit) is a 1928 American silent drama film directed by Phil Rosen. The 56-minute film was written by Wyndham Gittens and Frances Guihan, shot by cinematographer Herbert Kirkpatrick and was produced by Sterling Pictures.

== Cast ==
- Barbara Bedford as Elinor
- Robert Ellis as Harry Wayland
- DeWitt Jennings as Martin Wayland
- Freddie Burke Frederick as Sonny
- Florence Turner as Miss Lawson
- Paul Weigel as The Butler
- Alan Roscoe as Cliff Lawson
