= One Touch of Nature =

One Touch of Nature may refer to:

- One Touch of Nature (1909 film)
- One Touch of Nature (1917 film)

== See also ==
- Nature's Touch
