= Stranded (1927 film) =

1927 film

- Directed by: Phil Rosen
- Screenplay by: Frances Guihan; Wyndham Gittens
- Story by: Anita Loos
- Produced by: Joe Rock
- Starring: Shirley Mason; William Collier Jr. John Miljan
- Cinematography: Herbert Kirkpatrick
- Edited by: Leotta Whytock
- Production company: Sterling Pictures
- Release date: August 15, 1927 (US)
- Running time: 6 reels
- Country: United States
- Language: English

Stranded is a 1927 American silent romance film, directed by Phil Rosen. It stars Shirley Mason, William Collier Jr., and John Miljan, and was released on August 15, 1927.

== Cast list ==
- Shirley Mason as Sally Simpson
- William Collier Jr. as Johnny Nash
- John Miljan as Grant Payne
- Florence Turner as Mrs. Simpson
- Gale Henry as Lucille Lareaux
- Shannon Day as Betty
- Lucy Beaumont as Grandmother
- Rosa Gore as Landlady

== Preservation status ==
- This film survives in the Library of Congress collection.

Edward Lorusso produced a restored version of the film for video with a new music score by David Drazin. (see IMDb external link)
