= Martha M. Stanley =

American playwright

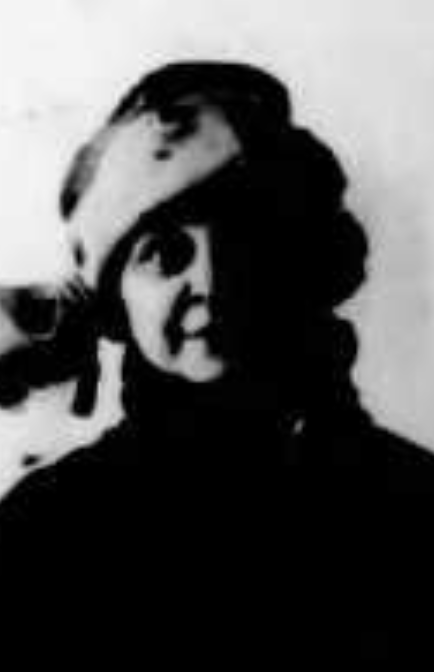
- Martha M. Stanley, from her 1922 passport application
- Born: Martha Norwood Burgess; November 20, 1867; Harwich, Massachusetts, U.S.
- Died: January 15, 1950 (age 82); Los Angeles, California, U.S.
- Occupations: Writer, playwright

Martha Melean Stanley, née Martha Norwood Burgess (November 20, 1867 – January 15, 1950), also known as Martha Norwood Stanley, was an American playwright from Massachusetts. She wrote fiction and stage dramas, and collaborated with playwright Adelaide Matthews to create several successful comedies in the 1920s. Some of her works have been adapted to film.

== Early life ==
Martha "Mattie" Burgess was born in Harwich, Massachusetts, the daughter of Stephen Burgess and Lydia Sears Foster Burgess. Both of her parents were also born in Harwich. Her father was a sea captain. She married Canadian-born printer John R. Stanley in 1894.

== Career ==
She wrote short fiction for magazines, and a novel, before she wrote her first play with her "girlhood friend", Adelaide Matthews.

She moved to Los Angeles. Her husband died in 1937.

== Reviews ==
Stanley and Matthews's first show, Nightie Night, was a hit in New York, so much that there were questions about whether two new playwrights were the actual authors, or whether their names were a pseudonym for an established playwright such as Jane Cowl or Jane Murfin. However, "the reason for its superior workmanship was the fact that they had studied their art from the ground up and spent a great many years in perfecting their technique," explained a newspaper reviewer in 1920. In 1921 The New York Times profiled Stanley and Matthews under the headline "Two Sudden Playwrights."

The Los Angeles Herald called Nightie Night "a merry, giggle-ful little play" that handles romantic farce with "tact" instead of vulgarity. The New York Times called their 1921 show The Teaser an "ingenious comedy".

== Death and burial ==
She died in 1950 at the age of 82. Both of the Stanleys' graves are in Forest Lawn Memorial Park, in Glendale, California.

== Works ==
=== Non-fiction ===
- "'Took the Cake': 'Sweet Charity' Made Sweeter" (1894, Boston Post)

=== Fiction ===
- The Souls of Men (1913, novel, illustrated by Joseph Cummings Chase)
- "In the Discard" (1915, short story) Argosy Volume 79 Issue 4
- "Times Have Changed" (1915, short story), Young's

=== Plays ===
- Nighty Night (September 9, 1919 – January 17, 1920)
- Scrambled Wives (August 5, 1920 – September 1920)
- The Teaser (1921)
- The House of Chance (1921)
- The House in the Woods (1921), along with Adelaide Matthews
- Long Live the Queen (1921), along with Adelaide Matthews
- My Son (September 17, 1924 – May 1925)
- New Houses (1925)
- Puppy Love (January 27, 1926 – May 1926)
- The Wasp's Nest (October 25, 1927 – November 1927)
- Carnival of Lies (1927)
- Let and Sub-Let (May 19, 1930 – June 1930)
- The First Mrs. Chiverick

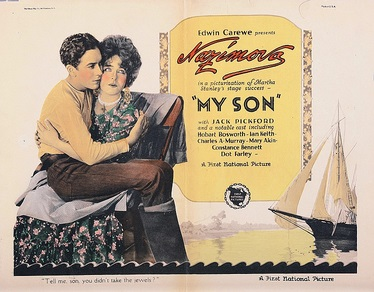
Lobby card for My Son

== Filmography ==
- Scrambled Wives (1921) based on the play The First Mrs. Chiverick by Adelaide Matthews and Martha M. Stanley
- My Son (1925)
- The Teaser (1925)
