= Irene Pavloska =

American opera singer

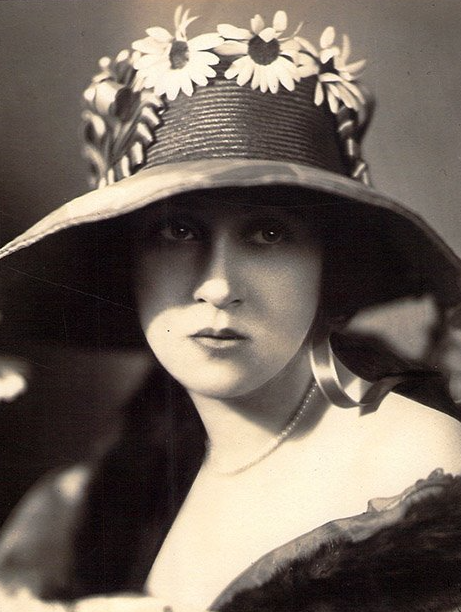
- Born: Irene Levi; February 17, 1889; Saint-Jean, Quebec, Canada
- Died: February 12, 1962 (aged 72); Chicago, Illinois, United States
- Burial place: Spanish and Portuguese Congregation Cemetery, Montreal
- Organizations: Chicago Civic Opera Company; Sherwood School of Music
- Spouse: Abraham Sherwin (m. 1909; div. 1911) Arthur Edmund Carewe (m. 1915; div. 1921) Dr. Maurice Mesirow (m. 1928; died 1960)
- Musical career
- Origin: Montreal, Quebec
- Occupation: Operatic mezzo-soprano
- Label: Brunswick Records

Irene Levi Mesirow (February 17, 1889 – February 12, 1962), known professionally as Irene Pavloska, was a Canadian mezzo-soprano and composer.

== Biography ==
Irene Pavloska was born to affluent Jewish parents Pauline (née Saxe) and David Levi in Saint-Jean, Quebec, and raised in Montreal. She was educated at Dunham Ladies' College in nearby Dunham, the High School of Montreal, and at a boarding school in Frankfurt. She later studied under Edmond Duvernoy at the Conservatoire de Paris.

She first performed with the Montreal Opera Company under the stage name Olga Pawloska in the 1911–12 season, and took on the name Irene Pavloska before touring as Juliska in Sári in the 1914–15 season in New York.

Intermittently between 1915 and 1934 she was associated with the Chicago Civic Opera Company, beginning with her debut as Musetta in La bohème, alongside Nellie Melba as Mimì. Her other notable roles with the Company include Suzuki in Madama Butterfly, Olga Sukarev in Fedora, Stephano in Roméo et Juliette, Meg Page in Falstaff, and Princess Clarice in the premiere of The Love of Three Oranges. Outside of Chicago, she notably played in The Firefly in Los Angeles (1921), and sang the title role in the Canadian debut of Rose-Marie at the Royal Alexandra Theatre in Toronto (1925).

She died while waiting for a train at Chicago Union Station on February 12, 1962, at the age of 72.

== Personal life ==
Pavloska married New York furrier Abraham Sherwin (né Sheverenski) in March 1909; the two divorced in January 1911. Her second marriage was to Armenian-American silent film actor Arthur Edmund Carewe, whom she married in February 1915. Plans for her and Carewe to co-star in a series of films were apparently cut short by their divorce in 1921.

Pavloska's romantic affair with her personal physician, Dr. Maurice Elias Mesirow, was the subject of significant media attention. They married on December 29, 1928, within a day of his divorce from his previous wife.

== Honours ==
Pavloska was an honorary member of the Chicago chapter of Sigma Alpha Iota. She was inducted into the Canadian Opera Hall of Fame in 1991.
