= The Rescuing Angel =

1919 film by Walter Edwards

- Directed by: Walter Edwards
- Screenplay by: Edith Kennedy; Clare Kummer
- Starring: Shirley Mason; Forrest Stanley; Arthur Edmund Carewe; John Steppling; Carol Edwards; James Neill
- Cinematography: James Van Trees
- Production company: Famous Players–Lasky Corporation
- Distributed by: Paramount Pictures
- Release date: April 6, 1919
- Running time: 50 minutes
- Country: United States
- Language: English

The Rescuing Angel is a 1919 American comedy silent film directed by Walter Edwards and written by Edith Kennedy and Clare Kummer. The film stars Shirley Mason, Forrest Stanley, Arthur Edmund Carewe, John Steppling, Carol Edwards and James Neill. The film was released on April 6, 1919, by Paramount Pictures.

== Plot ==
As described in a film magazine, Angela Deming, a daughter of wealth who seeks to postpone love indefinitely, is sought in marriage by Joseph Whitely, capitalist, Eliot Slade, idle rich, and William Hanley, just a boy. She keeps them all at bay until she accidentally learns that her father is facing bankruptcy. Without his knowledge she marries Whitely at once, realizing after the ceremony that she loves him. Hanley, believing himself justified, tells Whitely that she married him for his money. Whitely denounces her and they part. But after Whitely quickly learns the truth and seeks to find his lost bride. Angela applies for a divorce and accepts Slade's proposal as effective as soon as the divorce is granted. A rumored accident involving Whitely brings Angela back to a realization of her love. When the two finally locate each other both are ready for a reconciliation.

== Cast ==
- Shirley Mason as Angela Deming
- Forrest Stanley as Joseph Whitely
- Arthur Edmund Carewe as Eliot Slade
- John Steppling as Uncle George Deming
- Carol Edwards as Aunt Deming
- James Neill as John Calhoun Deming
- Edythe Chapman as Mrs. Deming
- T. D. Crittenden as Attorney Collins
- J. Park Jones as William Hanley
