= The Talker =

1925 film

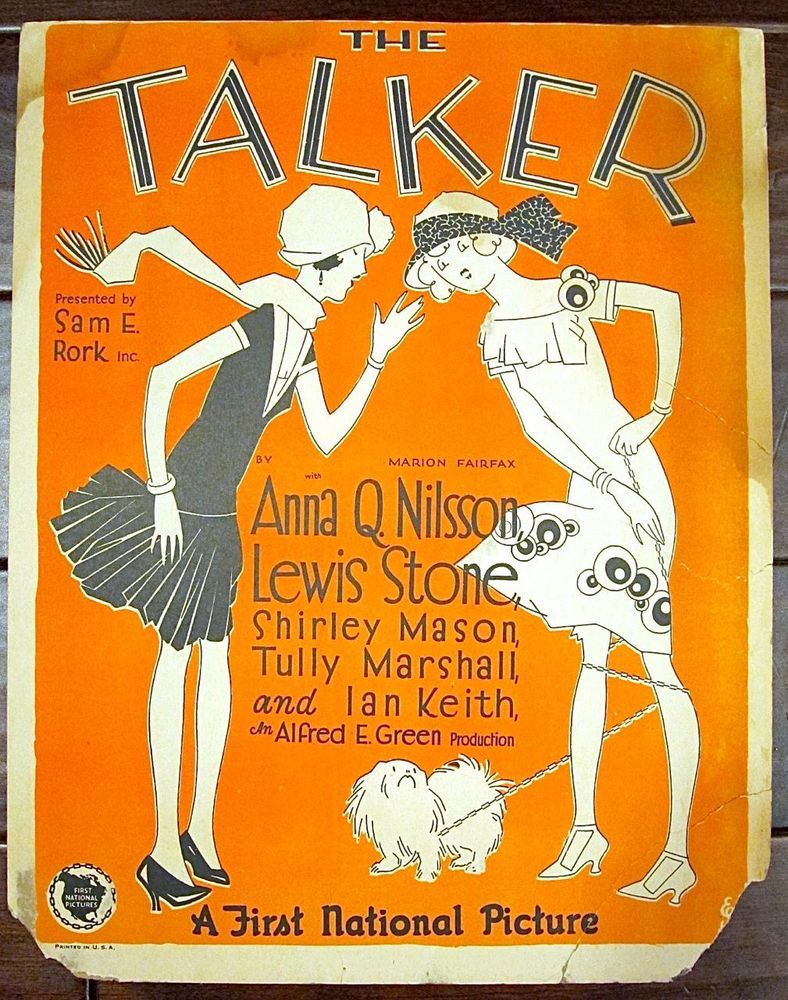
- Poster
- Directed by: Alfred E. Green
- Based on: The Talker by Marion Fairfax
- Starring: Anna Q. Nilsson; Lewis Stone; Shirley Mason
- Cinematography: Arthur Edeson
- Edited by: LeRoy Stone
- Production company: First National Pictures
- Distributed by: First National Pictures
- Release date: May 11, 1925
- Running time: 80 minutes
- Country: United States
- Languages: Silent; English intertitles

The Talker is a 1925 American silent drama film directed by Alfred E. Green and starring Anna Q. Nilsson, Lewis Stone, and Shirley Mason.

== Plot ==
As described in a film magazine review, Kate Lennox, dissatisfied with the suburban home she and her husband have purchased, makes the first payment on an automobile. Her husband, not knowing of it, when he gets a raise to his salary puts all his money towards paying for the home. Kate advocates in print that each woman should have three husbands, one to provide, one to entertain, and one to run the house. In reality, she is unable to yield to the kiss of another man. Her husband's sister Ruth, taking the writing for gospel, runs away with a married man who is short on his accounts. The Lenoxes part because of this, but are later reconciled. Ruth returns after a year to find her lover still waiting for her.

== Cast ==
- Anna Q. Nilsson as Kate Lennox
- Lewis Stone as Harry Lennox
- Shirley Mason as Ruth Lennox
- Ian Keith as Ned Hollister
- Tully Marshall as Henry Fells
- Barbara Bedford as Barbara Farley
- Harold Goodwin as Lonnie Whinston
- Gertrude Short as Maud Fells
- Lydia Yeamans Titus as Mrs. Fells
- Cecille Evans as Stenographer
- Charles West as Detective

== Preservation ==
In February of 2021, The Talker was cited by the National Film Preservation Board on their Lost U.S. Silent Feature Films list and is therefore presumed lost.

== Bibliography ==
- Monaco, James. The Encyclopedia of Film. Perigee Books, 1991.
