= Edward H. Griffith =

American film director, screenwriter, and producer

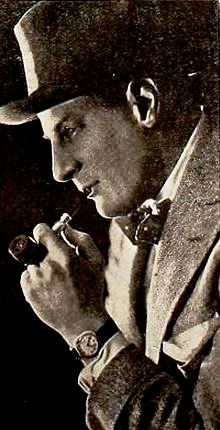
- Griffith in 1920
- Born: August 23, 1888; Bloomington, Illinois, United States
- Died: March 3, 1975 (aged 86); South Laguna, California, United States
- Other name: Eddie
- Occupations: Director, writer, producer
- Years active: 1916–1946 (film)

Edward H. Griffith (August 23, 1888 – March 3, 1975) (also known as E H Griffith, Lieut. Edward H. Griffith, Edward Griffith, F. H. Griffith and E. H. Griffith) was an American motion picture director, screenwriter, and producer.

== Biography ==
Born in 1888 in Bloomington, Illinois, Griffith directed 61 films from 1917 to 1946. In 1917 he directed In Love's Laboratory, a short for Thomas A. Edison, Inc.'s Conquest Pictures division about a man inventing safety matches and finding his relationship match. He directed Madeleine Carroll and Fred MacMurray in several films including Honeymoon in Bali (1939), Café Society (1939), Virginia (1941) and One Night in Lisbon (1941).

== Personal life ==
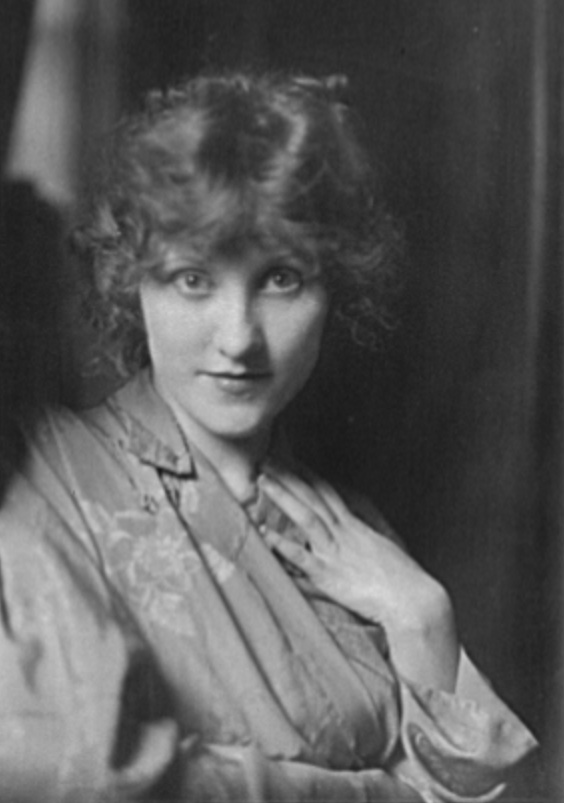
America Chedister in 1921

Griffith discovered the future actress America Chedister (1895–1975) while she was working as a showgirl and married her. They remained together until their deaths, having lived for several decades in Three Arch Bay, Laguna Beach.

Griffith died on March 3, 1975, at the age of 86. Chedister survived him by only a few months.

== Filmography ==
=== Director ===
- The Law of the North (1917)
- Billy and the Big Stick (1917)
- Barnaby Lee (1917)
- The Awakening of Ruth (1917)
- One Touch of Nature (1917)
- Your Obedient Servant (1917)
- The End of the Road (1919)
- Babs (1920)
- The Garter Girl (1920)
- The Vice of Fools (1920)
- If Women Only Knew (1921)
- The Land of Hope (1921)
- Dawn of the East (1921)
- Scrambled Wives (1921)
- Free Air (1922)
- Unseeing Eyes (1923)
- The Go-Getter (1923)
- Week End Husbands (1924)
- Another Scandal (1924)
- Bad Company (1925)
- Headlines (1925)
- White Mice (1926)
- Atta Boy (1926)
- Alias the Lone Wolf (1927)
- The Opening Night (1927)
- Afraid to Love (1927)
- The Price of Honor (1927)
- Captain Swagger (1928)
- The Shady Lady (1928)
- Love Over Night (1928)
- Hold 'Em Yale (1928)
- Paris Bound (1929)
- Rich People (1929)
- Holiday (1930)
- Beyond Victory (1931)
- Rebound (1931)
- The Animal Kingdom (1932)
- Lady with a Past (1932)
- Another Language (1933)
- Biography of a Bachelor Girl (1935), also producer
- No More Ladies (1935), also producer
- Next Time We Love (1936)
- Ladies in Love (1936)
- Cafe Metropole (1937)
- I'll Take Romance (1937)
- Honeymoon in Bali (1939)
- Cafe Society (1939)
- Safari (1940)
- Virginia (1941)
- Bahama Passage (1941)
- One Night in Lisbon (1941)
- Young and Willing (1943)
- The Sky's the Limit (1943)
- Perilous Holiday (1946)

=== Writer ===
- The Resurrection of Dan Packard (1916)
- The Last Sentence (1917)
- The Law of the North (1917)
- The End of the Road (1919)
- The Sea Raiders (1922)
- Alias the Lone Wolf (1927)
- The Opening Night (1927)
- The Shady Lady (1928)
- The Animal Kingdom (1932)
- Virginia (1941)
