= America Chedister =

American actress (1895–1975)

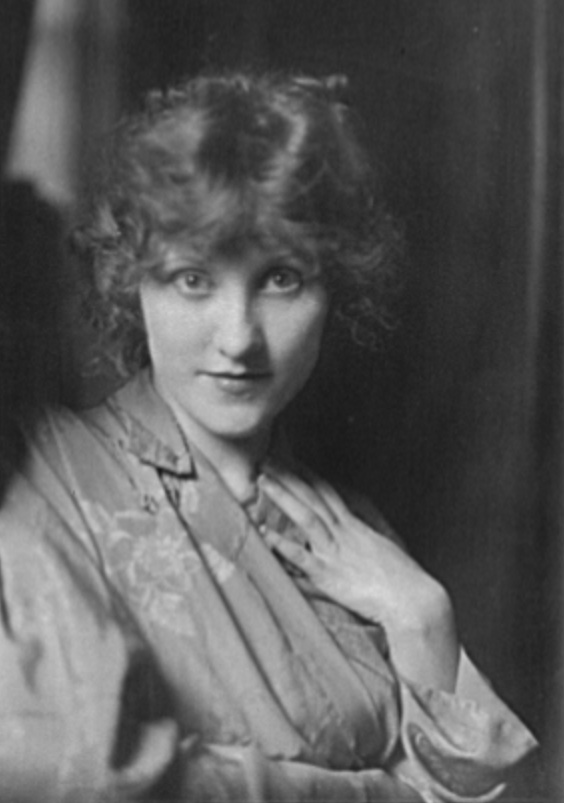
- Portrait photograph by Arnold Genthe, 1921
- Born: America Cooney; October 21, 1895; St. Clair Township, Iowa, U.S.
- Died: November 1, 1975 (aged 80); Laguna Beach, California, U.S.
- Resting place: Forest Lawn Memorial Park, Glendale.
- Other names: America Griffith
- Occupation: Actress
- Years active: 1915–1926
- Spouse: Edward H. Griffith (1920–1975)

America Chedister (October 21, 1895 – November 1, 1975), maiden name America Cooney, was an American actress and singer in musical theatre.

Born in St. Clair Township, Benton County, Iowa, Chedister was the daughter of Thomas Cooney and his wife Frances McFadden. Her stage name came from her maternal grandmother, America Susannah Chidester. She was discovered by Edward H. Griffith while working as a showgirl, and they married.

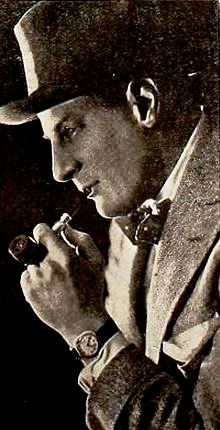
Edward H. Griffith in 1920

Chedister's film career ran between 1921 and 1926. In 1922 she appeared in The Sea Riders, a moving picture written and directed by her husband, set in a Cape Breton fishing village.

In 1923 at the Globe Theatre on Broadway, she originated the part of Mrs. DePuyster Fish in the musical comedy Jack and Jill.

In 1929, Edward Griffith bought a one-acre plot in a new area of Laguna Beach, California, called Three Arch Bay, and by 1932 had built one of the first houses there as a beach getaway. Called "The Lugger", the building included porthole windows and stairs salvaged from ships. The Map Room came from a ship called the Mary Dollar, and the Griffiths built a lighthouse between the house and the sea, as well as two separate guesthouses. The property was used for entertaining many guests, who included Lionel Barrymore and Claudette Colbert, and in retirement the Griffiths lived there until their deaths. The property is now listed on the National Register of Historic Places.

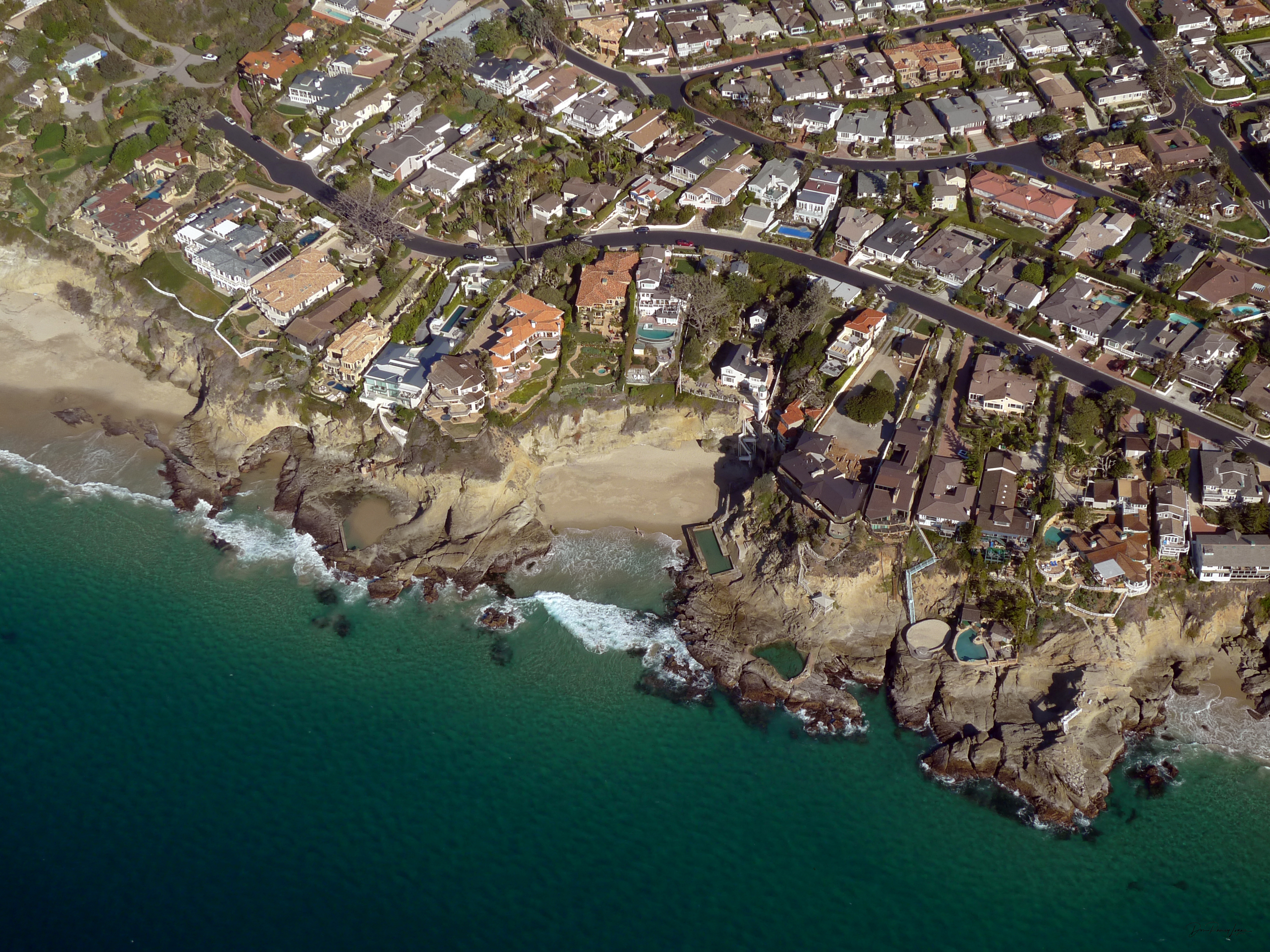
Three Arch Bay, center, with "The Lugger" nearest the cliff edge

Chedister died at Laguna Beach in November 1975 and was buried in the Forest Lawn Memorial Park, Glendale. In her will, she left money to the recently created Laguna Beach library, which was used to build a picture book room.

A portrait of Chedister by Arnold Genthe dating from November 1921 is in the Library of Congress.

== Films ==
- Dawn of the East (1921) as Mariya
- Scrambled Wives (1921) as Mrs. Halsey
- A Stage Romance (1922) as Lady Anne Boyle
- Enemies of Women (1923) as French Beauty
- Atta Boy (1926) as Fashionable Woman
