= My Son (1925 film) =

1925 film by Edwin Carewe

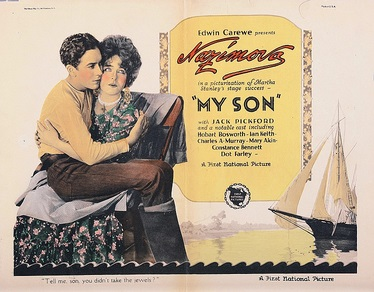
- Lobby card
- Directed by: Edwin Carewe
- Written by: Finis Fox
- Based on: My Son by Martha M. Stanley
- Produced by: Edwin Carewe; First National Pictures
- Starring: Alla Nazimova; Jack Pickford
- Cinematography: L. William O'Connell
- Distributed by: First National Pictures
- Release date: April 19, 1925
- Running time: 70 minutes
- Country: United States
- Language: Silent (English intertitles)

My Son is a 1925 American silent drama film directed by Edwin Carewe and starring Alla Nazimova. Carewe produced with First National who distributed the film.

== Plot ==
As described in a film magazine review, Tony, beloved son of Portuguese mother Anna Silva, allows his head to be turned in the summer resort colony by Betty Smith, daughter of a former neighbor now grown wealthy. She shows him how to become a popular dancing instructor. Afraid of losing her, he steals to keep up appearances. The theft is traced to him, but out of respect for his mother, the sheriff gives him a chance. In this crisis, the mother shows her strength and has him kidnapped and shanghaied for a two years' trip around the world. On board the ship is the young woman the mother wants him to marry.

== Cast ==
- Alla Nazimova as Anna Silva
- Jack Pickford as Tony
- Hobart Bosworth as Sheriff Ellery Parker
- Ian Keith as Felipe Vargas
- Mary Akin as Rosa Pina
- Charles Murray as Captain Joe Barnby
- Constance Bennett as Betty Smith
- Dot Farley as Hattie Smith
- Billy Butts as Freckled Face Boy (uncredited)

== Preservation ==
With no prints of My Son located in any film archives, it is a lost film. In February of 2021, the film was cited by the National Film Preservation Board on their Lost U.S. Silent Feature Films list.
