= Irving Briskin =

American film producer (1903–81)

- Photo by Los Angeles Times
- Born: February 28, 1903; New York City, U.S.
- Died: May 29, 1981 (aged 78); Los Angeles, California, U.S.
- Occupation: Film producer
- Years active: 1931–1945
- Spouse: Jean Bressler
- Children: 2

Irving Briskin (February 28, 1903 – May 29, 1981), was an American film producer of more than 200 films during the 1930s and 1940s. He was the brother of Samuel J. Briskin and Murray Briskin, both also film producers.

== Career ==
Briskin's film career began in 1923 as an auditor for Banner Productions, in New York City. In 1925, he moved to the Henry Ginsburg Distributing Corp. In 1926 he joined Sterling Pictures. In July 1927, when the studio got rid of their foreign broker system and implemented their own foreign sales, Briskin was put in charge, becoming head of their foreign department. That year he negotiated a major sales agreement with Cinematografica Astrea in Barcelona, Spain for distributing all of Sterling's product in Spain and Portugal, as well as six of its films in Italy. And later that same year he negotiated the sale of all 18 Sterling pictures in Hungary. In August 1928, he was named vice president of Sterling and given control over all of the company's operations. By September 1928, Briskin had his own company, Briskin Pictures Corp., headquartered in New York City.

In April 1931, Briskin became president of the newly formed Meteor Pictures, in New York. The new company had been formed from the former Briskin Distributing Company, which Briskin began in the late 1920s. In 1932 he moved over to Columbia Pictures, where the first film he produced was Fighting for Justice, starring Tim McCoy. He was put in charge of all films starring McCoy, and spearheaded the transition of McCoy from Westerns to other types of films. In 1936, Columbia renewed his contract. Briskin's contract to run his own production unit at Columbia was renewed in 1942, and again for three years in 1944. 1945 saw Briskin become the executive assistant to Harry Cohn at Columbia. In 1951, Briskin re-signed a seven-year contract with Columbia, to continue on as vice-president of the studio. In 1952, Briskin announced that he had signed a deal with Ford Motors for Columbia to produce 39 half-hour films to be shown on television.

In 1956, Briskin began his own production company, Briskin Productions, to release television material through Screen Gems, Columbia's television subsidiary. At the same time, he continued as V.P. at Columbia, and was put in charge of all production at Screen Gems. In doing so, Briskin resigned from his duties as the studio manager for Columbia's film division, to focus on television production. In April 1956, Briskin initiated a series of writing scholarships to encourage young talent. This was the first time in history this had been done. Six schools were to participate, with the first three selected being Fordham University, University of Chicago, and Iowa State University. In May 1946 he hired Mickey Rooney to produce a new series, Calamity Jane, although the show never seems to have been aired. Later in 1956, Briskin negotiated with Sam Cohn for a $1 million budget for television production for Screen Gems. His production produced several series for Screen Gems for the 1957 season, including Casey Jones. Also in 1956, Briskin set up a $2.5 million fund to entice independent producers to create product to be distributed through Screen Gems. The caveat was that the production either had to have a star attached, or be a very "powerful idea". Briskin said, "there are many producers seeking not only financing, but affiliation with an organization which can give their potential programs everything needed from production facilities to distribution and sales."

One of the productions Briskin was in charge of was Playhouse 90, which was broadcast on CBS-TV. By August 1957, Briskin had turned Screen Gems into the leading producer of content for television in Hollywood. One of the projects which Briskin created, but was never released was a television series based on The Secret Life of Walter Mitty, which he created a pilot for, but the three networks passed on due to it being "too adult for popular appeal". In 1959 Briskin was promoted at Columbia, and left the Screen Gems subsidiary, where he was replaced by William Dozier. In 1962, Briskin resigned from Columbia Pictures. However, he came back as an independent producer late in the year. In November, he joined with Debbie Reynolds and formed Harmon Enterprises. Reynolds was the president, with Briskin serving as vice-president. The company was to shoot on MGM lot.

== Personal life ==
In October 1940, Briskin purchased the Pepper Lane Farm, one of the oldest residences in southern California, dating from the 1850s. The farm was the estate of Alan O. Stearns and was located in Reseda, California, and consisted of seven acres. Briskin sold the estate for $65,000 in 1946 to a non-profit group, Field Photo Homes, Inc., who intended to develop the property into a memorial for the 13 men of the O.S.S.' Field Photo Unit during World War II. The purchase price had been donated by John Ford. The memorial ranch opened in July 1946.

His son, Frederick Briskin, was an assistant director at Columbia, and he also had a daughter, Joyce.

He was elected the head of Temple Israel of Hollywood twice, in 1947 and 1950. In 1950, he served as one of the pallbearers at the funeral of Al Jolson. In June 1955, he suffered a heart attack and was hospitalized at Cedars of Lebanon Hospital. He was also a pall-bearer for Harry Cohn in 1958. Briskin was one of the founding members of the Friar's Club of California.

In 1961, Briskin purchased a 2.5 percent share of the Riviera Hotel in Las Vegas, Nevada for $62,500. In December 1962, Briskin sold his 2.5 percent interest back to hotel corporation, for exactly what he paid for it the year before.

Briskin died on May 29, 1981.
