= Undressed (film) =

1928 film by Phil Rosen

- Directed by: Phil Rosen
- Written by: John Leeds (story); Frances Guihan; Terrence Daugherty (titles)
- Produced by: Sterling Pictures
- Starring: David Torrence; Hedda Hopper
- Cinematography: Hernert Kirkpatrick
- Distributed by: Sterling Pictures
- Release date: July 18, 1928
- Running time: 6 reels
- Country: United States
- Language: Silent (English intertitles)

Undressed is a lost 1928 American silent drama film directed by Phil Rosen and starring David Torrence, Hedda Hopper, and Virginia Brown Faire. It was produced and released by independent studio Sterling Pictures.

== Cast ==
- David Torrence as Martin Stanley
- Hedda Hopper as Mrs. Stanley
- Virginia Brown Faire as Diana Stanley
- Buddy Messinger as Bobby Arnold
- Bryant Washburn as Paul Howard
- Virginia Vance as Marjorie Stanley
