= A Million for Love =

1928 silent film

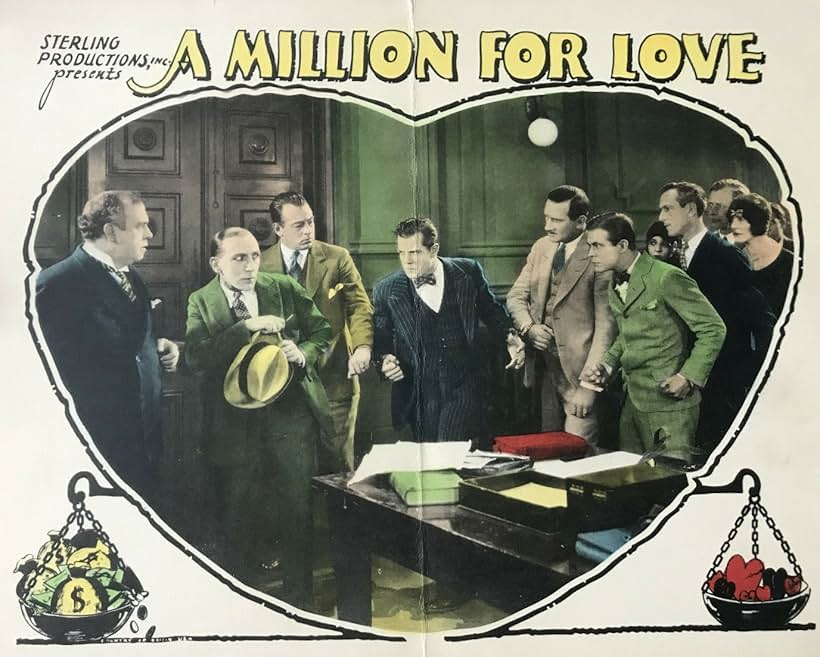
- Directed by: Robert F. Hill
- Written by: Peggy Gaddis; Frances Guihan
- Starring: Reed Howes; Josephine Dunn; Lee Shumway
- Cinematography: Herbert Kirkpatrick
- Edited by: Leotta Whytock
- Production company: Sterling Pictures
- Distributed by: Sterling Pictures
- Release date: April 15, 1928
- Running time: 58 minutes
- Country: United States
- Languages: Silent; English intertitles

A Million for Love is a 1928 American silent crime drama film directed by Robert F. Hill and starring Reed Howes, Josephine Dunn, and Lee Shumway.

== Cast ==
- Reed Howes as Danny Eagan
- Josephine Dunn as Mary Norfleet
- Lee Shumway as D.A. Norfleet
- Mary Carr as Mrs. Eagan
- Lewis Sargent as Jimmy Eagan
- Jack Rich as Slim
- Frank Baker as Pete
- Alfred Fisher as Judge

== Bibliography ==
- Munden, Kenneth White. The American Film Institute Catalog of Motion Pictures Produced in the United States, Part 1. University of California Press, 1997.
