= Dark Skies (1929 film) =

- Directed by: Harry S. Webb
- Written by: Jack Natteford
- Starring: Shirley Mason; Wallace MacDonald; William V. Mong
- Cinematography: Harry M. Fowler; Ray Ries
- Music by: Lee Zahler
- Production company: Biltmore Productions
- Distributed by: Capitol Film Exchange
- Release date: December 10, 1929
- Running time: 68 minutes
- Country: United States
- Language: English

Dark Skies is a 1929 American pre-Code crime drama film directed by Harry S. Webb and starring Shirley Mason, Wallace MacDonald and William V. Mong. Made by the Poverty Row studio Biltmore Productions it was an early low-budget talkie, set in a California coastal community. It featured the hit song "Juanita".

== Cast ==
- Shirley Mason as Juanita Morgan
- Wallace MacDonald as Captain Pedro Real
- William V. Mong as Mr. Morgan
- Tom O'Brien as Pete
- Josef Swickard as Señor Moreno
- Larry Steers as Captain Nelson
- Tom Wilson as Mike

== See also ==
- List of early sound feature films (1926–1929)

== Bibliography ==
- Michael R. Pitts. Poverty Row Studios, 1929–1940: An Illustrated History of 55 Independent Film Companies, with a Filmography for Each. McFarland & Company, 2005.
