= Grant Whytock =

American film producer

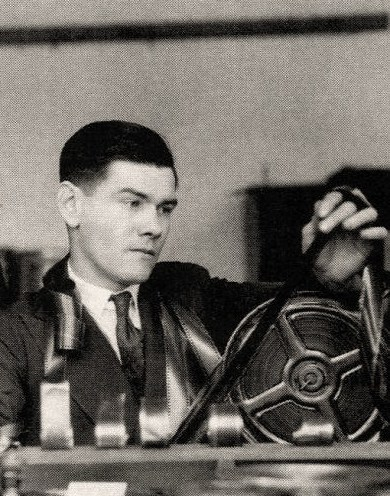
- Whytock, c. 1925
- Born: Grant Alexander Whytock; June 18, 1894; Salt Lake City, Utah, U.S.
- Died: October 11, 1981 (aged 87); Los Angeles, California, U.S.
- Occupation: Film editor
- Years active: 1917–1967 (film)
- Spouse: Leotta Wotton (m. 1918; died 1972)
- Family: Ora Carew (sister)

Grant Alexander Whytock (June 18, 1894 – November 10, 1981) was an American film editor and producer who worked on more than 80 films.

== Film editing ==
Whytock entered the American film industry with Universal Pictures around 1916. His first film credit was on Allen Holubar's Sirens of the Sea (1917). He was not credited for editing Erich Von Stroheim's Blind Husbands (1919), The Devil's Pass Key (1920), and the 18-reel version of Greed (1924).

He edited several films for Rex Ingram, notably Hearts Are Trumps (1920), The Four Horsemen of the Apocalypse (1921), and The Prisoner of Zenda (1922). Whytock edited films for Samuel Goldwyn, such as The Night of Love (1927), The Devil to Pay! (1930), and The Unholy Garden (1931). Whytock began his lengthy permanent collaboration with producer Edward Small in 1933 as editor for I Cover the Waterfront.

== Producer ==
In 1940, Whytock was credited as an associate producer on Small's production of Kit Carson, with the editing of the film credited to his son-in-law, Fred R. Feitshans Jr. (father of film producer Buzz Feitshans).

Whytock was credited as producer of Small's The Return of Monte Cristo (1946), The Black Arrow (1948), Walk a Crooked Mile (1948), and The Steel Lady (1953). With Small's Monkey on My Back (1957), Whytock began editing a number of Robert E. Kent's film productions.

In 1964, Whytock backed financially by Edward Small. created Admiral Pictures that produced Diary of a Madman (1963) and four Westerns starring Audie Murphy. Whytock's final film credits were as an associate producer and supervising film editor of The Wicked Dreams of Paula Schultz (1968) and as supervising film editor of The Christine Jorgensen Story (1970), both Edward Small Productions.

== Personal life ==
In 1918, Grant married fellow film editor Leotta Whytock. She died on October 13, 1972.
