= The Opening Night =

1927 film

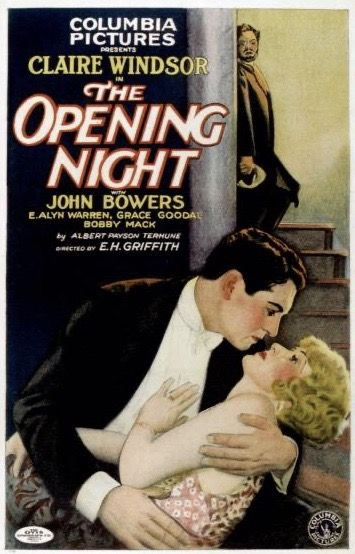
- Directed by: Edward H. Griffith
- Written by: Albert Payson Terhune; Edward H. Griffith
- Produced by: Harry Cohn
- Starring: Claire Windsor; John Bowers; E. Alyn Warren
- Cinematography: Ray June
- Production company: Columbia Pictures
- Distributed by: Columbia Pictures
- Release date: November 14, 1927
- Running time: 55 minutes
- Country: United States
- Languages: Silent; English intertitles

The Opening Night is a 1927 American silent drama film directed by Edward H. Griffith and starring Claire Windsor, John Bowers and E. Alyn Warren.

== Cast ==
- Claire Windsor as Carol Chandler
- John Bowers as Jimmy Keane
- E. Alyn Warren as Robert Chandler
- Grace Goodall as Gertrude Ames
- Bobbie Mack as Aaron Hinkle
- William Welsh as Fisherman

== Preservation and status ==
Complete copies of the film are held at the Library of Congress and the UCLA Film & Television Archive.
