= The Flying Marine =

1929 film directed by Albert S. Rogell

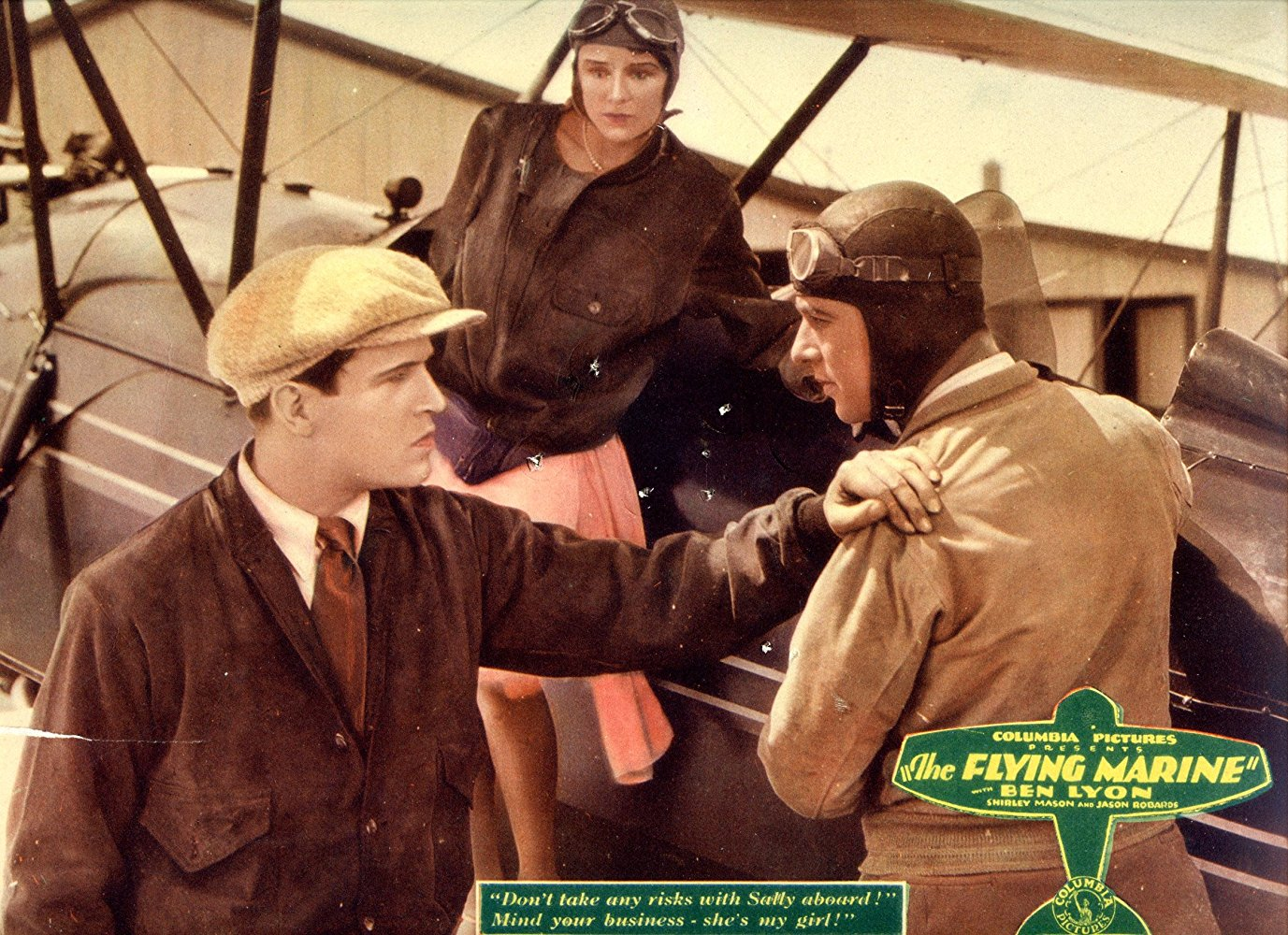
- Lobby card
- Directed by: Albert S. Rogell
- Written by: Jack Natteford (original story); Weldon Melick (titles)
- Produced by: Harry Cohn
- Starring: Ben Lyon; Shirley Mason; Jason Robards Sr.
- Cinematography: Ted Tetzlaff; Joseph Walker
- Edited by: William Hamilton
- Production company: Columbia Pictures
- Distributed by: Columbia Pictures
- Release date: June 5, 1929
- Running time: 65 minutes
- Country: United States
- Languages: Sound (Part-Talkie); English Intertitles

The Flying Marine is a 1929 American sound part-talkie action film directed by Albert S. Rogell and starring Ben Lyon, Shirley Mason and Jason Robards Sr. In addition to sequences with audible dialogue or talking sequences, the film features a synchronized musical score and sound effects along with English intertitles. The soundtrack was recorded using the Western Electric sound-on-film system. (Note: The Flying Marine appeared as Hollywood was transitioning to filming with sound.)

The film centers around a tale of brothers romancing the same girl.

== Plot ==
Mitch Moran (Jason Robards Sr.), a hardworking commercial pilot who runs his own small airport, receives a telegram: his younger brother Steve (Ben Lyon) has been honorably discharged from the Marines and is returning home after four years away. Mitch shares the news with Sally (Shirley Mason), the childhood friend he loves deeply but has not yet found the courage to propose to. Sally, delighted by Steve's return, organizes a homecoming party.

At the gathering, Steve—now a dashing young aviator—is instantly captivated by the radiant young woman before him, not recognizing her as the freckle-faced girl he once teased. When Sally reveals her identity, Steve sweeps her into his arms and kisses her impulsively. Mitch, who had hoped to propose that very night, watches with a sinking heart as Steve drives Sally home.

The following day, Steve takes Sally on a joyride in Mitch's plane, ignoring his brother's instructions to return quickly. He lands in an orchard and sweeps Sally off her feet with his daring charm and passionate declarations. Though she is dazzled by his bravado, in her heart Sally still feels a steadier love for Mitch. Meanwhile, back at the airport, Mitch anxiously waits for Steve's return, losing valuable business as customers drift away.

On their way back, Steve performs a series of reckless aerial stunts, thrilling Sally but horrifying Mitch, who fears for her safety. A film director on the ground, impressed by the performance, hires Steve to perform stunt flying for the movies.

That night, Steve proudly announces his engagement to Sally. Mitch, stricken, swallows his disappointment and congratulates them, though Sally sees the heartbreak in his eyes. Later, she notices him turning over his mother's engagement ring—the heirloom he had intended for her—and begins to question her true feelings.

When Steve presents Sally with the same heirloom ring, he admits he wants to hold onto it for sentimental reasons. But soon Sally learns the truth: Steve has pawned the ring after losing money at the racetrack. His carefree attitude toward responsibility and her future begins to trouble her deeply.

Mitch quietly redeems the ring from the pawnshop and returns it to Sally. During their heartfelt conversation, Sally realizes at last that her feelings for Mitch are far deeper than the fleeting infatuation she had with Steve. Together, she and Mitch resolve to speak honestly to Steve and ask him to release her from the engagement.

Before they can act, Steve takes to the skies again, performing dangerous stunt work for the film crew. In the glare of the Kleig lights, a strut on his plane snaps. The aircraft spirals out of control and crashes. Steve survives, but the accident leaves him gravely injured and deaf, with doctors warning that his life may hang in the balance.

Fearing the truth would kill his spirit, Mitch and Sally agree to maintain the fiction of their engagement. Sally devotes herself to Steve's recovery, playing the role of a loving fiancée while she and Mitch suppress their true feelings.

Steve's condition improves slowly, though doctors warn that only an operation might fully restore him. To raise money for the surgery, Mitch agrees to take Steve's place performing dangerous stunts, despite never having been a stunt pilot himself.

On the field, Steve notices Sally clinging desperately to Mitch, begging him not to risk his life. Believing her still devoted to him, Steve says nothing, but he begins to suspect the truth.

By chance, his hearing returns as two severed nerves mend. He overhears Mitch and Sally discussing their impossible situation—their love, their sacrifice, and their intention to wait until Steve is well. At first furious, Steve softens when he learns that Mitch intends to risk his life stunt-flying to pay for his operation.

Determined to save his brother, Steve secretly takes control of the plane during the performance, revealing himself to Mitch only once they are airborne. Together they share a moment of reconciliation before Mitch jumps with his parachute—only to have it snag on the plane's wing.

Realizing that unless he acts, Mitch will be dragged to his death, Steve crawls out onto the wing mid-flight. He frees the parachute, saving Mitch, but loses his grip on the control stick. The plane plunges to the ground and crashes.

Mitch lands safely, rushing with Sally to Steve's side. Mortally injured, Steve comforts them both, telling them he knows of their love and that his greatest happiness is to see them united. He dies with a smile, the reckless boy who, in his final act, proved himself a man.

== Cast ==
- Ben Lyon as Steve Moran
- Shirley Mason as Sally
- Jason Robards Sr. as Mitch Moran

== Production ==
Aviation film historian Stephen Pendo, in Aviation in the Cinema (1985) characterized The Flying Marine as a typical early "talkie" with a heavy reliance on dialogue, with as much as 70 percent of the film taken up by conversations.

== Reception ==
Aviation film historian James M. Farmer in Celluloid Wings: The Impact of Movies on Aviation (1984), had a similar reaction, saying that The Flying Marine was "... long on talk. Short on air action, save the concluding sequence and earlier air crash."

In a modern review in the TV Guide, The Flying Marine rated only one star out of five. The review stated: "Only the capable performances by the cast and some nifty airplane sequences keep this tepid tale of brothers romancing the same girl from being a total bore. ...Could have been better had more effort been applied to action sequences instead of the dull dramatics."

== See also ==
- List of early sound feature films (1926–1929)
