= The Shady Lady =

1928 film

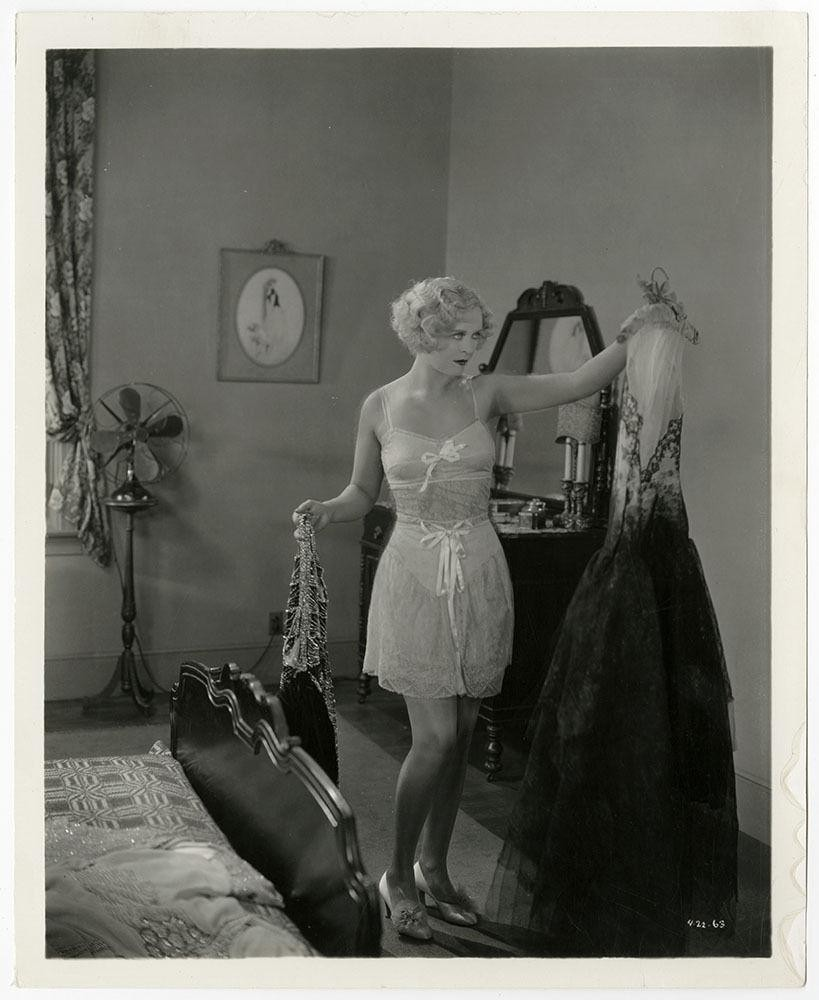
- Directed by: Edward H. Griffith
- Written by: Garrett Graham; Edward H. Griffith; Jack Jungmeyer; Jack Jungmeyer; Leonard Praskins; Richard L. Thorpe
- Produced by: Ralph Block
- Starring: Phyllis Haver; Robert Armstrong; Louis Wolheim
- Cinematography: John J. Mescall
- Edited by: Doane Harrison
- Production company: Pathé Exchange
- Distributed by: Pathé Exchange
- Release date: December 16, 1928
- Running time: 60 minutes
- Country: United States
- Languages: Sound (Part-talkie); English Intertitles

The Shady Lady is a 1928 sound part-talkie American drama film directed by Edward H. Griffith and starring Phyllis Haver, Robert Armstrong and Louis Wolheim. Although the film featured a few sequences with audible dialogue, the majority of the film had a synchronized musical score with sound effects. The film was released in both the sound-on-disc and sound-on-film format.

== Plot ==
Fleeing a murder scandal in New York in which she was wrongfully implicated, Lola Mantell escapes to the sultry streets of Havana, Cuba, where American outcasts and criminals drift beneath the tropical gaiety. Cloaked in mystery and tinged by rumor, she becomes known among the city’s smart set only as “The Shady Lady,” keeping aloof from the gambling houses and glittering clubs frequented by American expatriates.

Lola's cover is nearly shattered when Professor Holbrook, a brutish and sharp-eyed former New York gangster now operating a lavish casino, recognizes her one fateful evening. Holbrook, unaware that she was innocent of the New York crime, blackmails her into seducing a man who has become his biggest obstacle—Monte Blake, a cool and daring American soldier-of-fortune who has been systematically hijacking Holbrook’s illicit gun shipments.

Blake, for all his charm, is a formidable foe, and Holbrook sees Lola’s beauty and presumed criminal instincts as the perfect lure. Forced into the scheme, Lola reluctantly approaches Blake, determined to save herself by betraying another.

But as she spends time with the sardonic adventurer, Lola finds herself drawn to him—and ultimately falls deeply in love. When the moment comes to deliver Blake to Holbrook, her conscience overwhelms her. She confesses everything. To her astonishment, Blake remains calm. He already knew her identity and mission but had fallen for her regardless. Her honesty seals their bond.

Intertwined with this dangerous game is Jimmie Haley, a young and idealistic New York reporter assigned to expose American-led gunrunning in Cuba. It is Haley who first points Blake toward the mysterious "Shady Lady," unaware of the trap that is forming. Haley, still green but good-hearted, pieces together Lola’s past but—moved by her sorrow and courage—chooses not to expose her, even if it means losing his scoop. In an act of gallant sacrifice, he mails her a telegram clearing her name, just before he heads to Holbrook’s hacienda to investigate the smuggling ring.

Unaware of the deadly danger awaiting him, Haley walks directly into a trap. When Lola realizes what he’s done, and that Holbrook may kill the boy, she and Blake race to the rescue. Pretending she’s delivering Blake as promised, Lola confronts Holbrook. With bluff and bravery, she tricks the gang into revealing Haley’s whereabouts—badly beaten and locked in a closet.

Holbrook, in a violent fury, declares that all three of them—Lola, Blake, and Haley—are going “for a ride.” But just then, the telephone rings. The call is from the Havana newspaper editor. Lola had wisely tipped him off before coming. Haley is allowed to speak and warns that if they do not return immediately, the police will descend on Holbrook’s operation.

Cornered, Holbrook concedes defeat with a grim smile. The trio—Lola, Blake, and Haley—flee the hacienda and make for the midnight steamer to New York. For Lola, the ordeal has led not only to her redemption but to love and a future she never thought possible.

== Cast ==
- Phyllis Haver as Lola Mantell
- Robert Armstrong as Blake
- Louis Wolheim as Professor Holbrook
- Russell Gleason as Haley
- Jim Farley
- Joyzelle Joyner

== Music ==
The film featured a theme song entitled "Shady Lady" which was composed by Howard E. Johnson, Francis Gromon, Jack Grun and Josiah Zuro.

== Critical reception ==
A review in Harrison's Reports said that the film was a good story, keeping the viewer's interest throughout, with "pretty tense suspense" in its second half. It added, "The manner by which the different threads of the story are interwoven in the closing scenes is intelligent, and satisfies the discriminating spectator." The review praised Haver, Armstrong, and Wolheim for their work.

== See also ==
- List of early sound feature films (1926–1929)

== Bibliography ==
- Quinlan, David. The Illustrated Guide to Film Directors. Batsford, 1983.
