= The Teaser =

1925 film directed by William A. Seiter

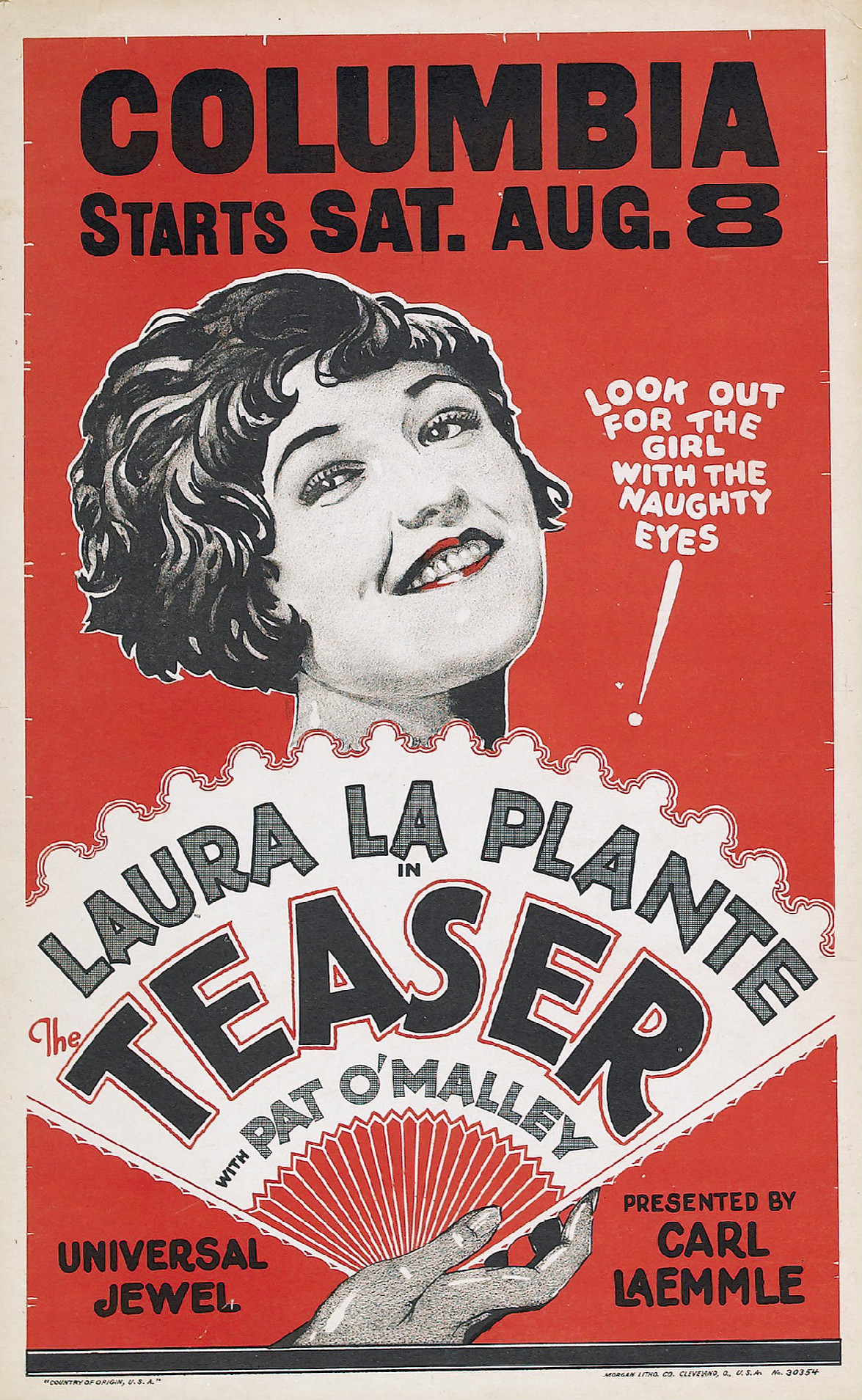
- 1925 window card
- Directed by: William A. Seiter
- Written by: Edward T. Lowe Jr. Jack Wagner; Lewis Milestone (adaptation)
- Based on: The Teaser by Adelaide Matthews and Martha M. Stanley
- Produced by: Carl Laemmle
- Starring: Laura La Plante; Pat O'Malley; Hedda Hopper; Walter McGrail
- Cinematography: George Barnes
- Production company: Universal Pictures
- Distributed by: Universal Pictures
- Release date: May 24, 1925
- Running time: 70 minutes
- Country: United States
- Language: Silent (English intertitles)

The Teaser is a lost 1925 American silent romantic comedy drama film written by Lewis Milestone, Edward T. Lowe Jr., and Jack Wagner based upon the play of the same name by Adelaide Matthews and Martha M. Stanley. The film was directed by William A. Seiter for Universal Pictures, and stars Laura La Plante, Pat O'Malley, Hedda Hopper, and Walter McGrail.

== Plot ==
Ann Barton, a girl from a once-wealthy family, must make a living by clerking in a cigar store. There she meets and falls in love with James McDonald, a cigar salesman. She is then adopted by Margaret Wyndham, her rich and aristocratic aunt, who disapproves of James due to his crude manners. Wishing to break up the two, Aunt Margaret sends Ann away to finishing school. In response, Ann acts out publicly and embarrasses her aunt. In the meantime, James learns how to be a proper gentleman and wins her back through having learned good manners and a more dignified bearing.

== Cast ==
- Laura La Plante as Ann Barton
- Pat O'Malley as James McDonald
- Hedda Hopper as Margaret Wyndham
- Walter McGrail as Roderick Caswell
- Byron Munson as Perry Grayle
- Vivien Oakland as Lois Caswell
- Wyndham Standing as Jeffry Loring
- Margaret Quimby as Janet Comstock
- Frank Finch Smiles as Jenkins
- Janet Gaynor (uncredited)

== Reception ==
The New York Times felt there was no need to be overly enthusiastic about the films's plot or character portrayals: "it contains a silly, soulless lot of characters and a weird idea of drama." When they expanded on Pat O'Malley's character of the cigar salesman, they granted that while it would be reasonable for a salesman to be willing to push his wares, they questioned the script having his character be so naive as to press the issue when he is at the home of his girlfriend's benefactors attempting to impress them and win her heart, by writing "one does not expect James MacDonald to be such an utter fool as to stick cigars under the noses of guests in a pretentious mansion at a time he hoped to wage war on the heart of the pretty Ann Barton." And in speaking toward Laura La Plante's character, who is scripted as being "a sly little minx, who believes in uttering untruths when they help her out of a difficulty, even if they do reflect on other persons", they offered that "Miss La Plante is not particularly effective in this picture." They concluded "The story is a pathetic little thing which is not apt to interest many persons." Time Magazine offered that "The extraordinarily blonde Laura La Plante occupies herself genially enough in the title part."

== Preservation ==
With no holdings located in archives, The Teaser is considered a lost film.
