= Shirley Mason (actress) =

American actress (1901–1979)

- Photograph of Mason taken in the 1920's
- Born: Leonie Flugrath; June 6, 1901; Brooklyn, New York, U.S.
- Died: July 27, 1979 (aged 78); Los Angeles, California, U.S.
- Resting place: Westwood Memorial Park
- Occupation: Actress
- Years active: 1910–1929
- Spouse(s): Bernard Durning; Sidney Lanfield
- Relatives: Edna Flugrath (sister); Viola Dana (sister)

Shirley Mason (born Leonie Flugrath; June 6, 1901 – July 27, 1979) was an American actress of the silent era.

== Biography ==
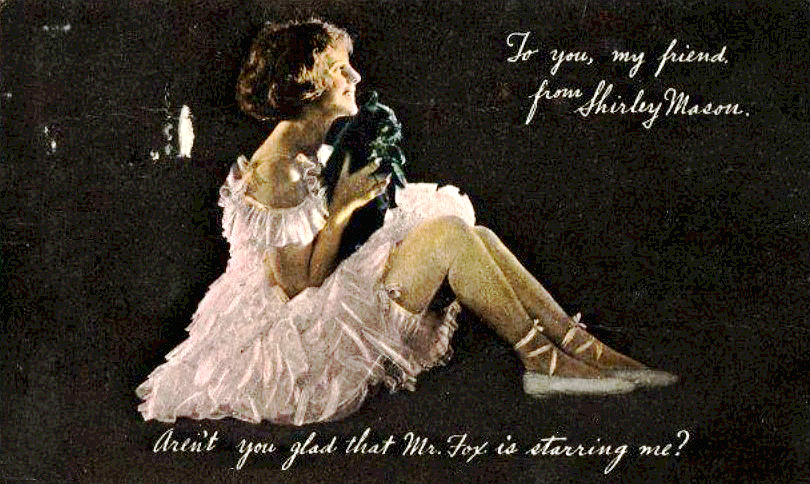
Promotional postcard mailed for Mason's 1920 film Molly and I

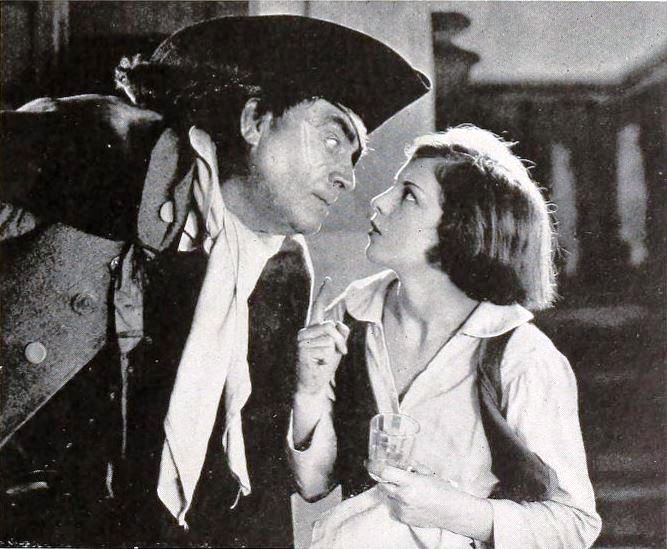
Charles Stanton Ogle (the first screen Frankenstein monster) as Long John Silver and Shirley Mason as Jim Hawkins in Treasure Island (1920)

Mason was born in 1901 in Brooklyn, New York, to Emil and Mary (née Dubois) Flugrath. She and her two sisters Edna and Virginia became actresses at the insistence of their mother, who had first enrolled them in dance classes at a very young age. The sisters spent much of their childhood touring with companies at Coney Island, Elks Clubs and other venues.

Mason, and her sister Virginia (changed professionally to Viola Dana), made their film debuts at the ages of 10 and 13, respectively, in the film A Christmas Carol (1910). Mason's next film was 1911's The Threshold of Life (1911).

As a child actress, Mason was not in high demand. It was not until 1915 that she played her role in Vanity Fair. She acted for Edison studios in 1916, starring in The Littlest Magdalene. In 1917, her career saw a major advance as she was cast in 13 films that year alone, and was given the title role in the film The Awakening of Ruth. Mason continued a vibrant acting career through the 1920s, landing several major roles. In the 1929 film, The Flying Marine, she appeared in her final role (along with her sister Viola,) capping her career at 109 films between the years of 1910 and 1929.

All three Flugrath sisters were hired by Edison Studios. It was here that she became Shirley Mason, a name selected for her for her role in the film series Seven Deadly Sins (1917). Viola met her husband, John Collins, at Edison, and the young director and actress became a successful husband-wife team. Edna also met her future husband, Harold Shaw, at the Edison Studios. When he went to the UK in 1913 to direct at the London Film Company, Edna accompanied him; however, they did not marry until 1917 when they were producing films in South Africa. Shirley had appeared in several films and had met her future husband, Bernard Durning. Durning was a fellow actor and also director, and although eight years her senior, the two were married when Mason was only 16 years old. Mason and Durning enjoyed a very happy marriage, with Durning directing films back East, and Shirley acting in them. All was well until 1923 when Bernard contracted typhoid fever and died, leaving 22-year-old Shirley a widow. Mason remarried in 1927 to director Sidney Lanfield. The two remained married until Lanfield died of a heart attack in 1972.

On July 27, 1979, Mason died of cancer at age 78 in Los Angeles.

== Filmography ==
- A Christmas Carol (1910, short)
- A Fresh Air Romance (1912, short)
- Vanity Fair (1915)
- Cy Whittaker's Ward (1917)
- The Seventh Sin (1917)
- The Light in Darkness (1917)
- The Little Chevalier (1917)
- The Lady of the Photograph (1917)
- The Tell-Tale Step (1917)
- The Apple Tree Girl (1917)Survives
- Where Love Is (1917)
- The Law of the North (1917)
- The Awakening of Ruth (1917)Survives
- Pride (1917)
- Wrath (1917)
- Come on In (1918)
- Good-Bye, Bill (1918)
- The Winning Girl (1919)
- The Rescuing Angel (1919)
- The Final Close-Up (1919)
- The Unwritten Code (1919)
- Putting It Over (1919)
- Secret Service (1919)
- Her Elephant Man (1920)
- Treasure Island (1920)Lost
- Merely Mary Ann (1920)
- Molly and I (1920)
- Love's Harvest (1920)
- The Little Wanderer (1920)
- The Girl of My Heart (1920)
- Flame of Youth (1920)
- Wing Toy (1921)
- The Lamplighter (1921)
- The Mother Heart (1921)
- Lovetime (1921)
- Ever Since Eve (1921)
- Jackie (1921)
- Queenie (1921)
- Little Miss Smiles (1922)
- Pawn Ticket 210 (1922)
- Lights of the Desert (1922)
- The Ragged Heiress (1922)
- Shirley of the Circus (1922)
- Very Truly Yours (1922)
- The New Teacher (1922)
- Youth Must Have Love (1922)
- South Sea Love (1923)
- Lovebound (1923)
- The Eleventh Hour (1923)
- Love Letters (1924)
- Curlytop (1924)
- The Star Dust Trail (1924)
- Great Diamond Mystery (1924)
- That French Lady (1924)
- My Husband's Wives (1924)
- What Fools Men (1925)
- Lord Jim (1925)Survives
- The Talker (1925)
- The Scarlet Honeymoon (1925)
- Scandal Proof (1925)
- Desert Gold (1926)
- Don Juan's Three Nights (1926)Survives
- Sin Cargo (1926)
- Sweet Rosie O'Grady (1926)
- Rose of the Tenements (1926)
- Let It Rain (1927)
- Sally in Our Alley (1927)Lost
- Stranded (1927)
- The Wreck (1927)
- Rich Men's Sons (1927)
- The Wife's Relations (1928)
- So This Is Love? (1928)
- Vultures of the Sea (1928)
- Runaway Girls (1928)
- Dark Skies (1929)
- Anne Against the World (1929)
- The Flying Marine (1929)
- The Show of Shows (1929)Survives
