= Adolph Klauber =

American drama critic and theatrical producer

Adolph Klauber (April 29, 1879 − December 7, 1933) was an American drama critic and theatrical producer. He was born in Louisville, Kentucky, to Edward and Caroline Brahms Klauber. He left Louisville after high school to attend the University of Virginia, after which he moved to New York and took a position with the Empire Theatre Company. In 1900 he began working as a reporter for the New York Commercial Advertiser. From there he moved to the New-York Tribune, and thence to The New York Times, where he became drama critic in 1906, a post he held for twelve years. It was during this time that he married the actress and playwright Jane Cowl. He then began working with Archibald and Edgar Selwyn, two of the founders of Goldwyn Pictures, later to become part of MGM, and worked for a while there as a casting director.

== Productions ==
Klauber later became a producer. The list of plays he produced includes:

- 1919: Nightie Night
- 1920: Scrambled Wives; The Emperor Jones; and Diff'rent
- 1921: Like a King
- 1922: The Charlatan

With Jane Cowl he also worked on the following productions:

- 1923: Lilac Time; and Smilin' Through

With the Selwyns he produced:

- 1923: Romeo and Juliet; and Pelléas and Mélisande
- 1924: Antony and Cleopatra
- 1925: The Depths
- 1928: Diversion

== Death ==
Klauber died on December 7, 1933, in Louisville, Kentucky.
