= Dawn of the East =

1921 film

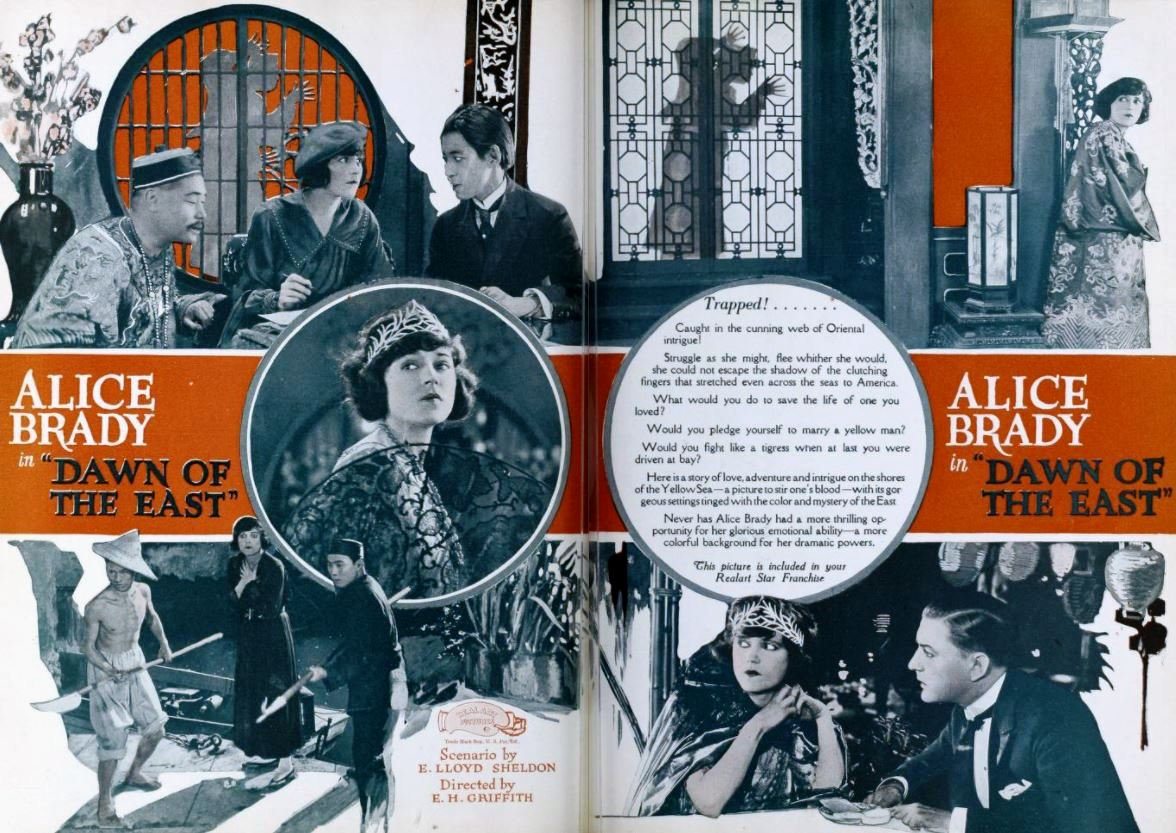
- Advertisement
- Directed by: Edward H. Griffith
- Screenplay by: E. Lloyd Sheldon
- Starring: Alice Brady; Kenneth Harlan; Michio Itō; America Chedister; Betty Carpenter; Harriet Ross
- Cinematography: Gilbert Warrenton
- Production company: Realart Pictures Corporation
- Distributed by: Paramount Pictures
- Release date: October 1921
- Running time: 50 minutes
- Country: United States
- Language: Silent (English intertitles)

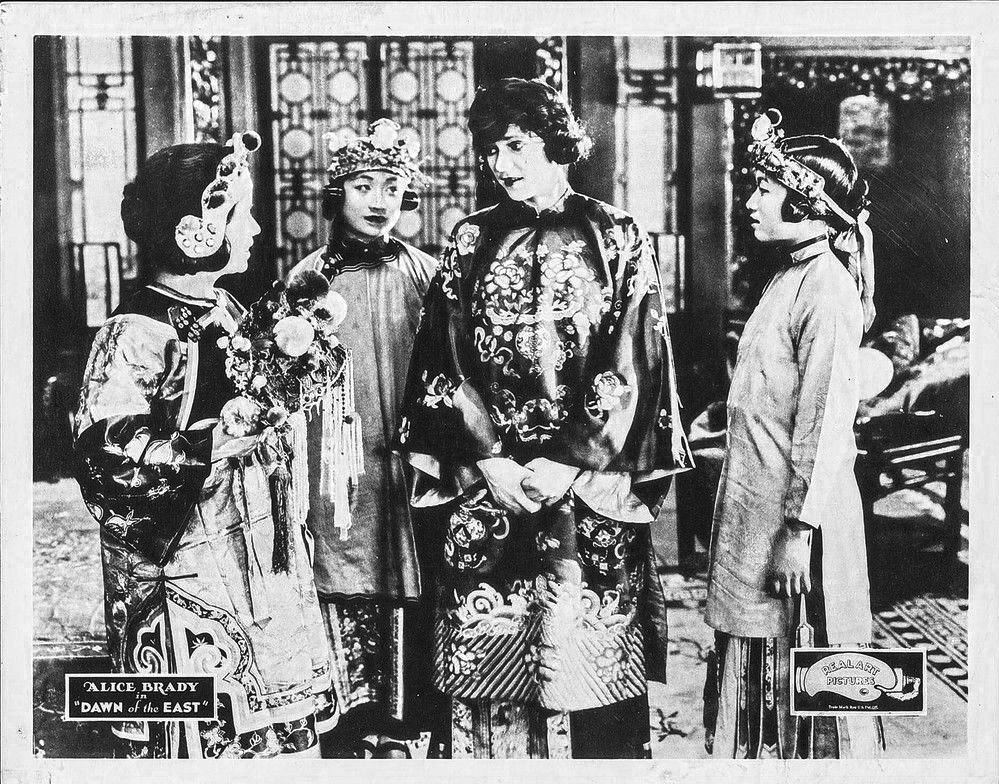
Lobby card

Dawn of the East is a lost 1921 American silent drama film directed by Edward H. Griffith and written by E. Lloyd Sheldon. The film stars Alice Brady, Kenneth Harlan, Michio Itō, America Chedister, Betty Carpenter, and Harriet Ross. The film was released in October 1921, by Paramount Pictures.

== Plot ==
As described in a film magazine, Russian Countess Natalya is stranded in Peking, China, and is forced to dance in a public hall to support an invalid sister. She is lured into marriage to a Chinese man through political intrigue, but escapes as she believes the ceremony was not completed and goes to America, where she becomes engaged to an American diplomat. Her persecutors follow her, but she outwits them in a happy ending.

== Cast ==
- Alice Brady as Countess Natalya
- Kenneth Harlan as Roger Strong
- Michio Itō as Sotan
- America Chedister as Mariya
- Betty Carpenter as Sonya
- Harriet Ross as Mrs. Strong
- Sam Kim as Wu Ting
- Frank Honda as Liang
- H. Takemi as Kwan
- Patricio Reyes as Chang
