= Adelaide Matthews =

American playwright (1876–1958)

Adelaide Matthews (1876-1958) was a playwright in the United States. Some of her works were adapted to film. She was born in Kenduskeag, Maine. She wrote plays with Martha M. Stanley and with Anne Nichols.

== Plays ==
- His Hearts Desire (1916), along with Anne Nichols.
- Nightie Night (1919), along with Martha M. Stanley. Originally titled Oh How Could You.
- Scrambled Wives (1920), along with Martha M. Stanley

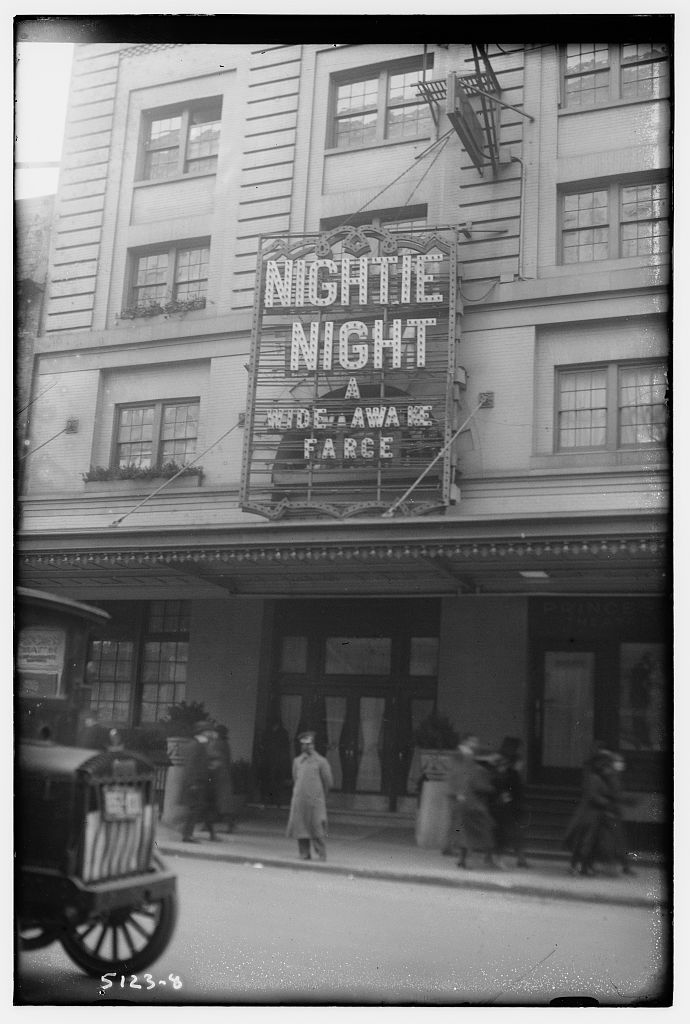
Marquee for a showing of Nightie Night in 1919

- Just Married (1921), along with Anne Nichols
- The Teaser (1921), along with Martha Stanley
- Puppy Love (1926), with Martha Stanley
- The Wasp's Nest (1927) and published in 1929
- First Night Out
- Nearly Married (1929), with Anne Nichols
- The First Mrs. Chiverick; a comedy in 3 acts by Adelaide Matthews and Martha Stanley. New York, London, (1930)

== Filmography ==
- Scrambled Wives (1921)
- The Teaser (1925)
- Just Married (1928)
