= Burning Up Broadway =

1928 film directed by Phil Rosen

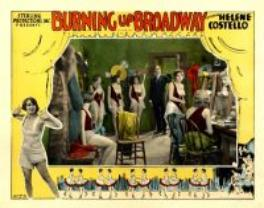
- Poster for the film
- Directed by: Phil Rosen
- Screenplay by: Frances Guihan
- Story by: Norman Houston
- Produced by: Joe Rock
- Starring: Helene Costello; Robert Frazer; Sam Hardy
- Cinematography: Herbert Kirkpatrick
- Edited by: Leotta Whytock
- Music by: Michael Hoffman
- Production company: Sterling Pictures
- Release date: February 1928 (US)
- Running time: 6 reels
- Country: United States
- Language: English

Burning Up Broadway is a 1928 American silent drama film, directed by Phil Rosen. It stars Helene Costello, Robert Frazer, and Sam Hardy, and was released February 1928.

== Plot ==
Spike and Nick own a speakeasy in New York, where the chief chorus girl is Floss. When native New Yorker Harry Wells is visited by his friend from out west, Bob Travers, he takes Bob to the club. At the club, Travers becomes entranced with Floss, which becomes an issue with Spike, who is also romantically interested in her. Travers goes back to the club the following night, where he runs into Wells. Trying to find out more about Floss, Travers discovers that not only do Spike and Nick own the club, but they are also bootleggers. When he is discovered snooping, Spike and Nick knock Travers out, then take Floss with them as they go to receive their next shipment of bootleg liquor. Wells discovers Travers and revives him, revealing that he is in fact a revenue agent. He and Travers join Wells other agents and track Nick and Spike to the shipment drop-off point, where they rescue Floss, who is revealed as another revenue agent working undercover, and arrest Nick and Spike. Travers and Floss are free to continue their romance.

== Cast list ==
- Helene Costello as Floss
- Robert Frazer as Bob Travers
- Sam Hardy as Spike
- Ernest Hilliard as Harry Wells
- Max Asher as Nick
- Jack Rich as Slim

== Production ==
In early August 1927, it was announced that Burning Up Broadway would be one of eight features on Sterling Picture's 1927-28 schedule. Frances Guihan and Norman Houston had finished the screenplay in November 1927, and production on the film was scheduled to start filming on November 21, with Joe Rock as producer. In the beginning December Helene Costello was tagged as the female lead in the film. At the same time it was made known that Robert Frazer, Ernest Hilliard, and William Davidson would be in the supporting cast. The picture was scheduled to be released in January 1928. In mid-December Davidson was replaced by Sam Hardy for the male lead. Filming on the picture was completed by the end of December.

== Reception ==
The Film Daily gave the film a positive review, giving good grades on Phil Rosen's direction and Helene Costello's performance. They also enjoyed the mystery and suspense of the story. However, they were less than impressed with the cinematography, calling it "fair". Variety also gave the picture a positive review, calling it "A speedy entertaining production making up in action what it lacks in polish".
