= Nightie Night (play) =

1919 play by Martha M. Stanley and Adelaide Matthews

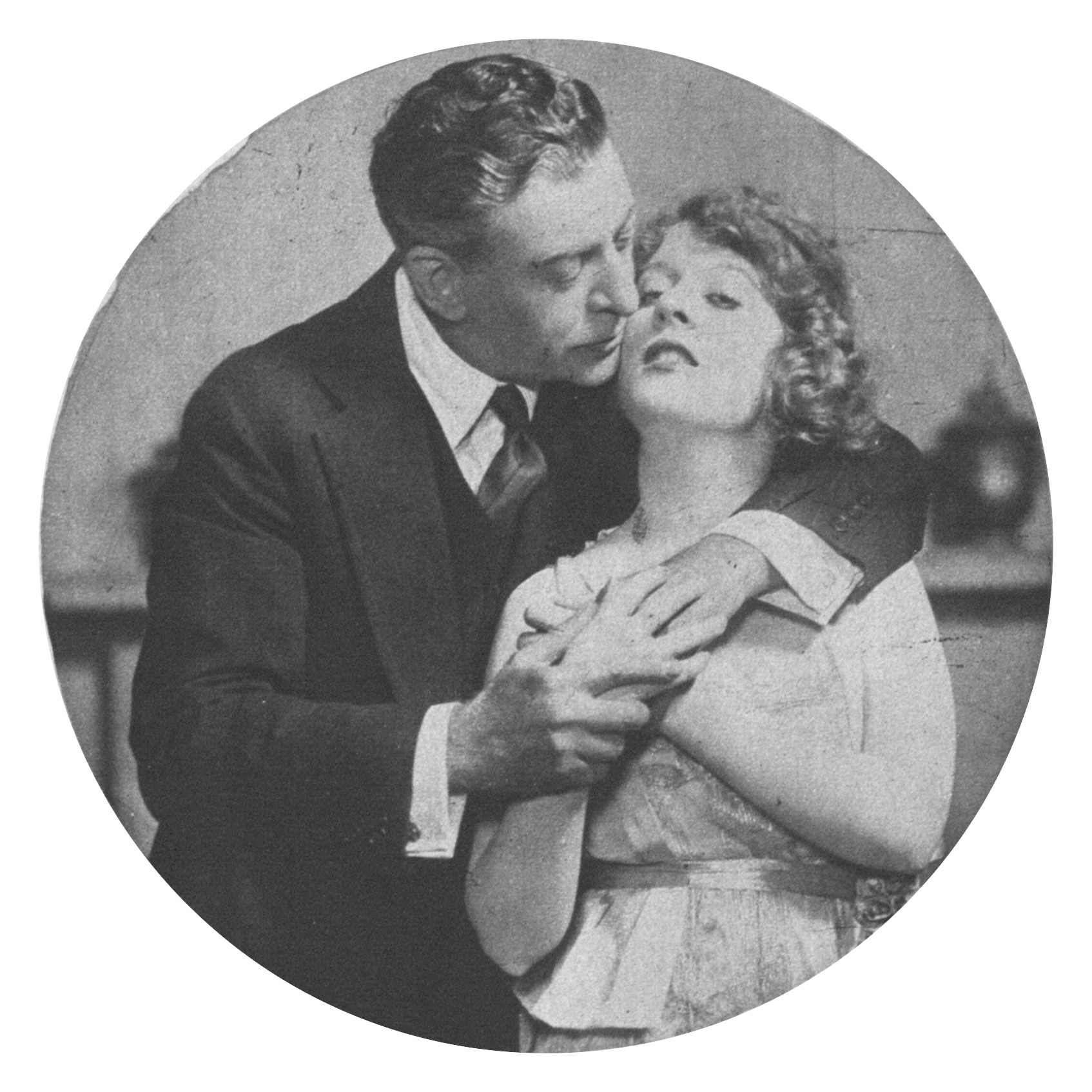
- Francis Byrne and Dorothy Mortimer in Nightie Night
- Original title: Oh How Could You
- Original language: English
- Written by: Martha M. Stanley and Adelaide Matthews
- First publication: 1929
- Subject: Newlyweds and nearly marrieds
- Genre: Farce
- Setting: A Pullman car; the Moffats' apartment

Premiere
- Date: September 9, 1919
- Place: Princess Theatre
- Directed by: Priestly Morrison
- Original run: 154 performances

Nightie Night is a play by Martha M. Stanley and Adelaide Matthews, originally titled Oh How Could You. A farce in three acts and a prologue with three settings, it has eight principal characters. The action of the play takes place over 24 hours. The story concerns a newlywed theatrical type caught up in a series of misunderstandings and mistaken intentions. According to reviewer Alexander Woollcott, the title had nothing to do with the play's storyline.

The play was first produced by Adolph Klauber and staged by Priestly Morrison. Nightie Night had early tryouts in Spring 1919, before being recast during the Summer. It had a week of tryouts in New Jersey during late July and early August 1919, but its Broadway premiere was delayed to early September 1919 due to the Actors' Equity strike. Nightie Night ran through January 1920, for 154 performances.

== Characters ==
Characters are listed in order of appearance within their scope..

Lead

- Billy Moffat is 28, married for one year, is a stage producer and a popular guy.
- Mollie Moffat is Billy's young wife, jealous of all the actresses with whom he has worked.

Supporting

- Trixie Lorraine is 25, Billy's old flame, a smartly dressed stage actress, now a widow with a baby.
- Ernestine Dare is 25, a divorcée, Billy's catty, interfering sister.
- Philip Burton is 18, Mollie's younger brother, who mistakenly sublets their apartment to Trixie.
- Jimmie Blythe is hot-tempered and humorless, who has married and left Trixie in three hours.

Featured

- Dr. Bentley is married, an older physician who lives in the same apartment house and loves bridge.
- Norah is the Moffat's housekeeper.

Bit players

- Porter, Waiter

== Synopsis ==
Prologue (A Pullman car traveling to New York from Washington, D. C. Noon.) Trixie and Billy are on the same train; him returning from a tryout to his wife of one year, and she going to a new acting job on Broadway. Trixie teases Billy about throwing her over for his new wife. She then confesses her impulsive second marriage to Jimmie Blythe, and of his abandonment of her when he discovers she was married before. Billy agrees that Jimmie is a hothead, his temperament not improved by long years making his fortune in South America. Trixie wheedles Billy into promising to tell Jimmie that she is a stage actress with a baby, which she also neglected to reveal before the ceremony. She then passes her broken bracelet, Jimmie's wedding present, to Billy, so he can have it fixed. Unknown to them, Ernestine has witnessed this last exchange. (Two-minute Curtain)

A trifle more space than was employed to print the Peace Treaty in this newspaper would be needed to give a coherent and detailed account of the plot of Nightie Night.... – Alexander Woollcott

Act I (Living room of the Moffat's apartment. That evening.)

Act II (Same as Act I. The next morning.)

Act III (The Moffat's kitchen. The next second.)

== Original production ==
=== Background ===
The two playwrights, Martha M. Stanley and Adelaide Matthews, had grown up together in Harwich, Massachusetts. Stanley became a writer while Matthews went on the stage, touring with Fiske O'Hara. Also in O'Hara's company was Anne Nichols. Matthews and Nichols co-wrote a play titled His Heart's Desire, which Augustus Pitou, O'Hara's producer, bought for him in June 1916. After leaving O'Hara's company, Matthews ran into Martha Stanley again in September 1916, when she was cast for The Mockery, which Stanley had written. They decided to collaborate on a play, producing Oh How Could You in early 1919, which was retitled Nightie Night by March 1919 when newspapers first reported Adolph Klauber was going to produce it.

Nightie Night was originally cast with Francis Byrne and Ione Bright as the Moffats, Malcolm Duncan as Jimmie Blythe, Marie Chambers as Ernestine, Jessie Busley as Trixie, Burford Hampton as Philip, Stanley Stanton as Dr. Bentley, and Suzanne Morgan as Norah. Edward Dresser played the Porter and Officer McKenna, a minor role that was dropped during tryouts. The production had a three-day tryout at the Playhouse in Wilmington, Delaware, starting April 14, 1919. The local reviewer said the play had no real climax, but was well received by the audience despite a lack of "spontaneity" in the acting. Nightie Night was next performed at the Shubert Garrick Theatre in Washington, D. C., starting April 20, 1919. One local critic dispelled any notion that it was "a naughty show" by stating it could have performed without controversy by the students at a female seminary. They also slighted the setting, and hoped the play might be more worthy of the price charged after the tryout stage.

=== Cast ===
Cast for the New Jersey tryouts and the Broadway run. Production was shut down by strike from August 7 through September 6, 1919.
Role	Actor	Dates	Notes and sources
Billy Moffat	Francis Byrne	Jul 28, 1919 - Jan 17, 1920	Byrne at 55 was far older than the character's age of 28. (Note: Byrne died a few years later of a heart attack while at the Players Club.)
Mollie Moffat	Dorothy Mortimer	Jul 28, 1919 - Jan 17, 1920	
Trixie Lorraine	Jane Warrington	Jul 28, 1919 - Jul 30, 1920	
Trixie Lorraine	Suzanna Willa	Jul 31, 1919 - Jan 17, 1920	
Ernestine Dare	Marie Chambers	Jul 28, 1919 - Jan 17, 1920	
Philip Burton	Frank Morgan	Jul 28, 1919 - Aug 02, 1919	Morgan was very active in the Actors' Equity strike, which may have cost him this role.
Philip Burton	Grant Mills	Sep 09, 1919 - Jan 17, 1920	Alexander Woollcott said Grant Mills "name sounds as if he were a village in Oneida County, New York". (Note: Despite Woollcott's jab, this was the actor's real middle and family name, having dropped his first name of Frank for stage billing.)
Jimmie Blythe	Malcolm Duncan	Jul 28, 1919 - Jan 17, 1920	
Dr. Bentley	Cyril Raymond	Jul 28, 1919 - Jan 17, 1920	Should not be confused with the much younger British actor Cyril Raymond.
Norah	Amy Ongley	Jul 28, 1919 - Aug 02, 1920	
Norah	Ruby Craven	Sep 09, 1919 - Jan 17, 1920	

=== Tryouts ===
After some recasting, Nightie Night had its next tryout in Long Branch, New Jersey, at the Broadway Theatre there, for three nights starting July 28, 1919. The local critic was positive about the acting of the two leads and reported the audience's satisfaction with the play. The production then moved to the Savoy Theatre in Asbury Park, New Jersey, for another three-night tryout starting July 31, 1919. The local reviewer called it "an adorably silly young bride play" that the audience interrupted with constant laughter.

=== Actors' Equity strike ===
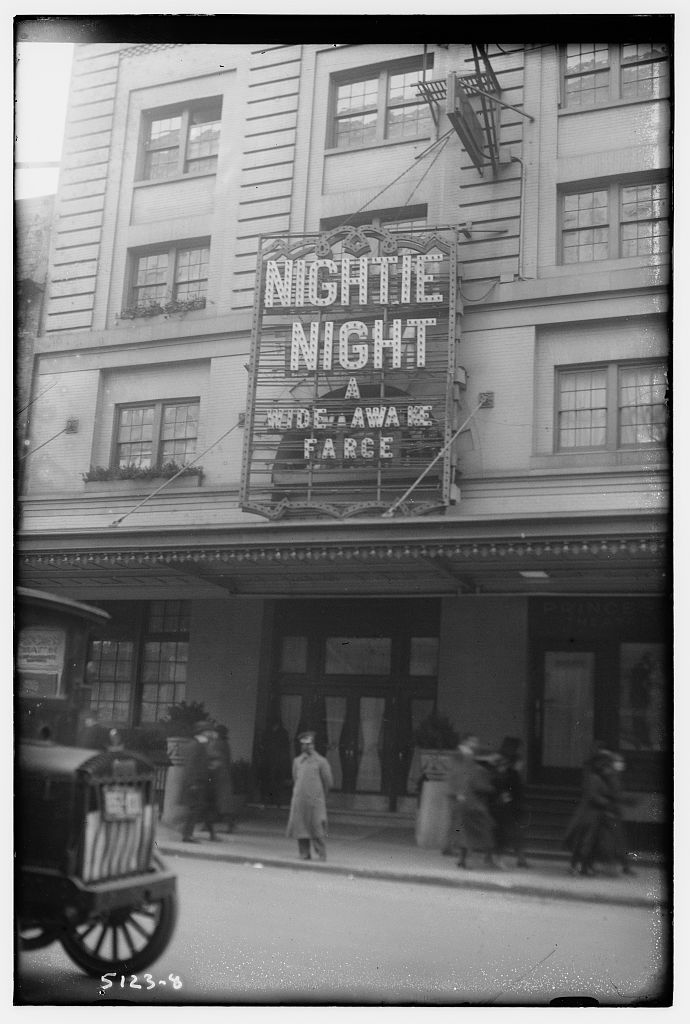

Originally scheduled to premiere at the Princess Theatre on Thursday, August 7, 1919, the production could not take place due to the launching of the Actors' Equity strike on that date. While audiences at other theatres lined up at the box office for refunds, the first night attendees at the Princess were told their tickets would be honored for the future premiere of Nightie Night.

=== Broadway premiere and reception ===
Nightie Night finally had its Broadway premiere at the Princess Theatre on Tuesday, September 9, 1919. The reviewer for The Sun noted this was Adolph Klauber's long-awaited debut as a producer, having previously been an actor and drama critic, who had also managed the acting career of his wife Jane Cowl. Heywood Broun pronounced it a workmanlike farce for which he gave credit to playwrights Martha M. Stanley and Adelaide Matthews, and to excellent acting. Alexander Woollcott wrote of Nightie Night that "It begins boldly with a quite brazenly impossible situation, keeps going at a furious rate by dint of many doors and lies, and stops at 11 o'clock, because it is time for the audience to go home".

=== Broadway closing ===
Nightie Night closed at the Princess Theatre on Saturday, January 17, 1920, after 154 performances. (Note: Burns Mantle has mistakenly given the play's name as Nighty-Night when providing this statistic.)

== Bibliography ==
- Martha Stanley and Adelaide Matthews. Nightie Night: A Farce in a Prologue and Three Acts. Samuel French, 1929.
