= Arthur Edmund Carewe =

American actor

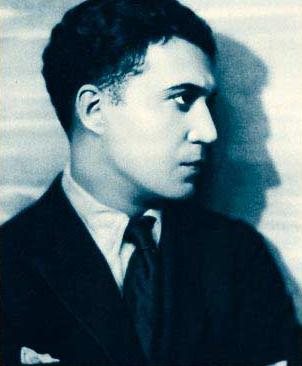
- Carewe publicity photo in Stars of the Photoplay (1922)
- Born: Hovsep Hovsepian; December 30, 1884; Trabzon, Ottoman Empire
- Died: April 22, 1937 (aged 52); Santa Monica, California, U.S.
- Other name: Arthur Edmund Carew
- Education: American Academy of Dramatic Arts
- Occupation: Actor
- Years active: 1919–1936
- Spouse: Irene Pavloska (m. 1915; div. 1921)

Arthur Edmund Carewe (December 30, 1884 – April 22, 1937), born Hovsep Hovsepian (Armenian: Հովսեփ Հովսեփյան), was an Armenian-American stage and film actor of the silent and early sound film era.

== Early life ==
He was born on December 30, 1884 to a prosperous Armenian family in Trabzon (Trebizond), Ottoman Empire (present-day Turkey). His father, Garo, was engaged in the banking business and carried some influence from his positions in the national legislature and board of education. His father died in 1892, and the Hamidian massacres forced the Hovsepian family to emigrate. Carewe emigrated to the United States on August 7, 1896, arriving in New York Harbor on the Augusta Victoria, having departed from Cherbourg. He was accompanied by his elder brother, Ardasches. Another elder brother, Garo Armen, had preceded them, and their mother arrived the following year.

He attended Cushing Academy in Ashburnham, Massachusetts, after which he studied painting and sculpture. At the turn of the century, he and his elder brother Garo ran a rug and furnishings business in New York City. He decided upon a stage career and attended the American Academy of Dramatic Arts in New York City, graduating in March 1904 with the David Belasco Gold Medal for Dramatic Ability.

== Career ==
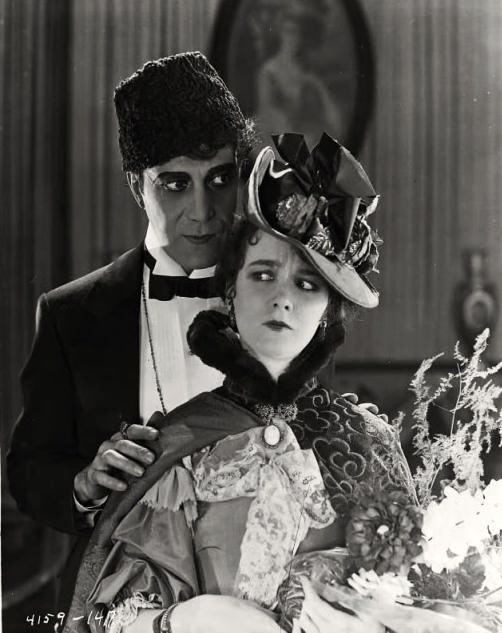
Arthur Edmund Carewe & Mary Philbin in The Phantom of the Opera (1925)

By 1910, he had assumed the stage name of "Arthur Carew" and earned attention in national newspapers under the name Joseph Hosepian for a suspected fake suicide attempt over the actress/dancer Nance Gwynne. He relocated to Chicago sometime before 1915 and operated another furnishing goods business until he moved to Hollywood in 1919. His debut role was in the Constance Talmadge comedy Romance and Arabella. He became a naturalized citizen June 28, 1918.

During his time in the motion picture industry, Carewe became a well-respected character actor and would perform in several classic literary screen adaptations, including The Phantom of the Opera (1925), The Cat and the Canary and Uncle Tom's Cabin (1927), specializing as shady, neurotic, wild-eyed characters, which he seemed to revel in playing. He also continued to perform sporadically in regional theaters, essaying in 1921 the role of Prinzivalle in Monna Vanna by Maurice Maeterlinck. In 1926, he wrote two screenplays for First National that were never produced. In 1928, he traveled to Europe, but a proposal to perform a self-penned screenplay for Universum Film AG was never realized.

He was for a time considered for, and later turned down, the role of Count Dracula in the 1931 film, which would eventually go to Bela Lugosi. Carewe appeared in fifty films over the course of his career, mostly during the silent film era.

== Personal life ==
Carewe married the soprano Irene Pavloska (née Irene Levi) on February 17, 1915, in Chicago. They divorced in 1921.

== Later years and death ==
Shortly after the release of his final film, Charlie Chan's Secret, in 1936, Carewe suffered a stroke. On April 22, 1937, he was found dead in his car in the parking lot of a Santa Monica beach motel, apparently from a self-inflicted gunshot wound to the head.

== Filmography ==
Year	Title	Role	Notes
1919	Venus in the East	Middy Knox	Lost film
1919	Romance and Arabella	Claude Estabrook	Lost film
1919	Daughter of Mine	Joseph Rayberg / Baron Landsandhome	Lost film
1919	The Rescuing Angel	Eliot Slade	Lost film
1919	Girls	Wilbur Searles	Lost film
1919	The World and Its Woman	Count Alix Voronassof	Lost film
1919	Dangerous Waters	Victor DeLara	Lost film
1919	Bonnie Bonnie Lassie	Archibald Loveday	Lost film
1920	Rio Grande	Don Jose Alvarado	Lost film
1920	Children of Destiny	Count Di Varesi	Lost film
1920	The Breath of the Gods	Prince Hagane	Lost film
1920	The Palace of Darkened Windows	The Rajah	Lost film
1920	Burning Daylight	Arthur Howison	
1921	The Mad Marriage	Christiansen	Lost film
1921	The Easy Road	Heminway	Lost film
1921	Sham	Bolton	Lost film
1921	Bar Nothing	Stinson	Lost film
1921	Her Mad Bargain	Grant Lewis	Lost film
1922	The Prodigal Judge	Col. Fentress	Lost film
1922	My Old Kentucky Home	'Con' Arnold	Lost film
1922	His Wife's Husband	John Brainerd	Lost film
1922	The Ghost Breaker	Duke d'Alba	Lost film
1923	Refuge	Prince Ferdinand	Lost film
1923	Daddy	Paul Savelli	Lost film
1923	Trilby	Svengali	Lost film
1923	The Ten Commandments	Israelite Slave	Uncredited
1923	The Song of Love	Ramlika	
1924	Sandra	Henri La Flamme	Lost film
1924	The Price of a Party	Kenneth Bellwood	Incomplete film
1925	The Boomerang	Poulet	
1925	The Phantom of the Opera	Ledoux	
1925	A Lover's Oath	Prince Yussuf	Lost film
1925	The Only Thing	Gigberto	Alternative title: Four Flaming Days
1926	Torrent	Salvatti	
1926	Volcano!	Maurice Séquineau	
1926	Diplomacy	Count Orloff	
1926	The Silent Lover	Captain Herault	
1927	The Claw	Major Anthony Kinsella	
1927	The Cat and the Canary	Harry	
1927	A Man's Past	Lieutenant Destin	Lost film
1927	Uncle Tom's Cabin	George Harris	
1930	The Matrimonial Bed	Dr. Fried (credits) / Dr. Beaudine (in film)	
1930	Sweet Kitty Bellairs	Capt. Spicer	
1931	Captain Applejack	Ivan Borolsky, aka Jim	
1931	God's Gift to Women	Dr. Louis Dumont	
1931	The Gay Diplomat	Suave Man	
1932	Doctor X	Dr. Rowitz	
1933	Mystery of the Wax Museum	Sparrow - Professor Darcy	
1935	Thunder in the Night	Professor Omega	
1936	Charlie Chan's Secret	Professor Bowen	(final film role)
