= The Law of the North (1917 film) =

1917 silent film

- Directed by: Burton George; Edward H. Griffith
- Written by: Edward H. Griffith
- Starring: Shirley Mason; Pat O'Malley; Richard Tucker
- Cinematography: Charles E. Gilson
- Production company: Edison Studios
- Distributed by: K-E-S-E Service
- Release date: April 2, 1917
- Running time: 50 minutes
- Country: United States
- Languages: Silent; English intertitles

The Law of the North is a 1917 American silent adventure film directed by Burton George and Edward H. Griffith and starring Shirley Mason, Pat O'Malley and Richard Tucker.

== Cast ==
- Shirley Mason as Edith Graham
- Pat O'Malley as Cpl. John Emerson
- Richard Tucker as The Rt. Hon. Reginald Annesley
- Charles Sutton as Lt. Robert Graham
- Sally Crute as Marie Beaubin
- Fred Jones as Pierre Beaubin
- Robert Kegerreis as Ba'Tiste

== Bibliography ==
- Brégent-Heald, Dominique. Borderland Films: American Cinema, Mexico, and Canada During the Progressive Era. University of Nebraska Press, 2015.
