= Sterling Pictures =

American film company

Sterling Pictures was a film company headed by Henry Ginsberg during the silent film era. Phil Rosen directed many of Sterling's films. H. R. Ebenstein was the manager of sales. In July 1927, when the studio got rid of their foreign broker system and implemented their own foreign sales, Irving Briskin was put in charge, becoming head of their foreign department. In August 1928, Briskin was named vice president of Sterling and given control over all of the company's operations. Arthur F. Beck was the company's president. He married actress and screenwriter Leah Baird.

== Filmography ==
- A Woman's Heart (1926)
- Devil's Dice (1926)
- Unknown Treasures (1926)
- Men of the Night (1926)
- Closed Gates (1927)
- The Cruel Truth (1927)
- Tongues of Scandal (1927)
- She's My Baby (1927)
- Face Value (1927)
- In the First Degree (1927)
- Pretty Clothes (1927)
- Wolves of the Air (1927)
- Red Signals (1927)
- The Cancelled Debt (1927)
- Stranded (1927)
- Marry the Girl (1928)
- Undressed (1928)
- A Million for Love (1928)
- Outcast Souls (1928)
- Burning Up Broadway (1928)
