= Enemies of Women =

1923 film by Alan Crosland

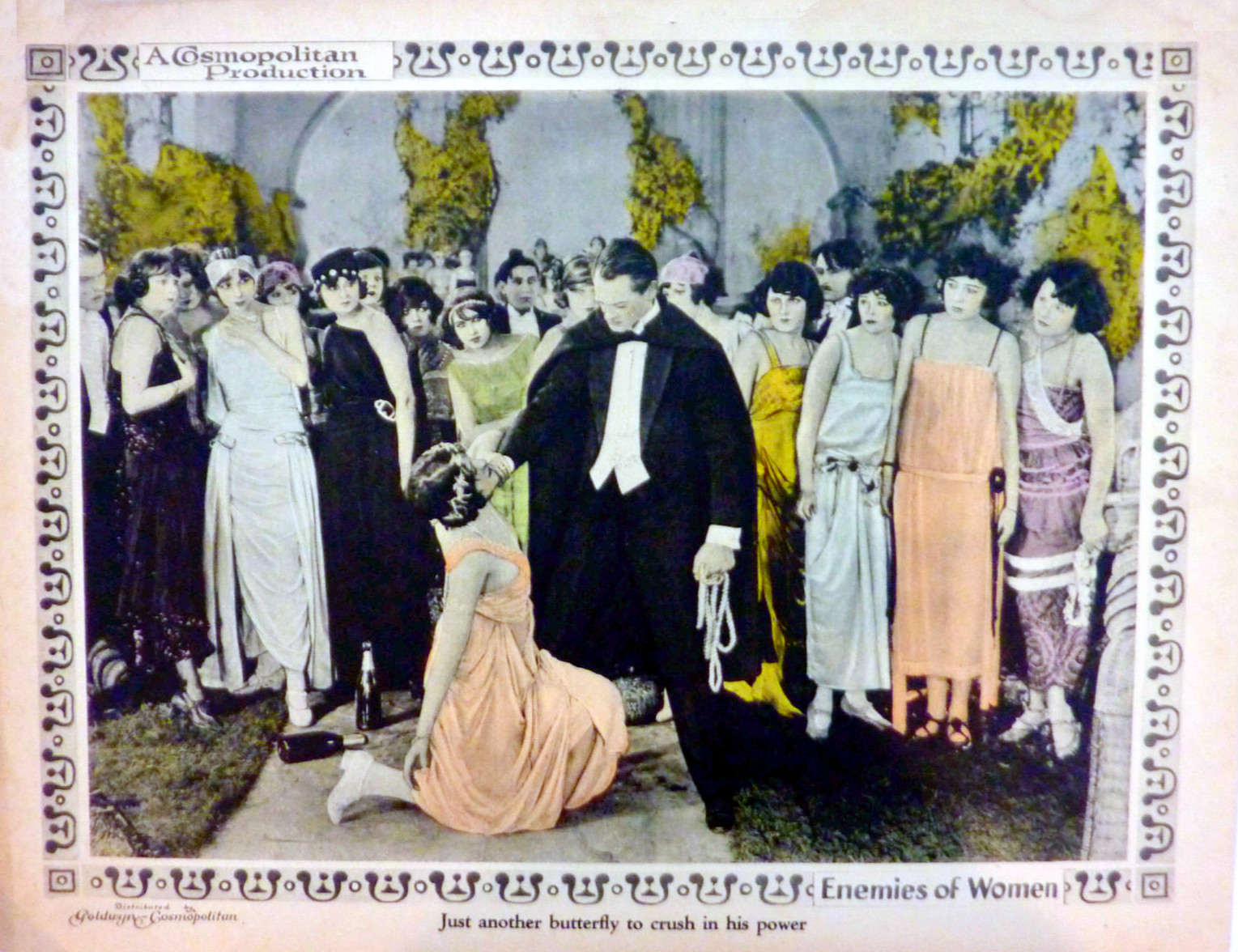
- Lobby card
- Directed by: Alan Crosland
- Written by: John Lynch (scenario)
- Based on: Enemies of Women by Vicente Blasco Ibanez
- Produced by: Cosmopolitan Productions
- Starring: Alma Rubens; Lionel Barrymore; Pedro de Cordoba
- Cinematography: Ira H. Morgan
- Music by: William Frederick Peters
- Production company: Cosmopolitan Productions
- Distributed by: Goldwyn Pictures
- Release date: April 15, 1923
- Running time: 105 minutes
- Country: United States
- Language: Silent (English intertitles)

the film incomplete

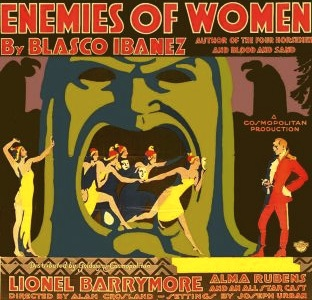
film poster.

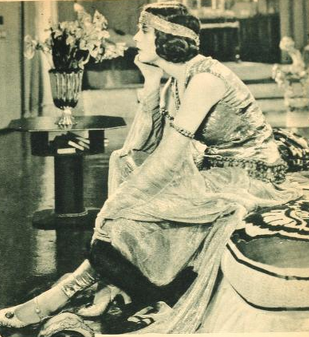
Alma Rubens, in Enemies of Women

Enemies of Women is a 1923 American silent romantic drama film directed by Alan Crosland and starring Lionel Barrymore, Alma Rubens, Gladys Hulette, Pedro de Cordoba, and Paul Panzer. The film was produced by William Randolph Hearst through his Cosmopolitan Productions. Pre-fame actresses Clara Bow and Margaret Dumont have uncredited bit roles.

The film is based on the novel of the same title by Vicente Blasco Ibáñez.

== Plot ==
As described in a film magazine review, Alicia, an adventuress, has occasion to befriend a Russian prince with whom she flees to France. They are happily living together when the Prince sees her with her young son and, knowing nothing of his existence, mistakes him for a youthful lover and quits her. He and several friends form a club known as the "Enemies of Women" and plan to have nothing more to do with them. However, circumstances finally reunite Alicia and the prince and they find happiness together.

== Cast ==
- Lionel Barrymore as Prince Michael Lubimoff
- Alma Rubens as Alicia
- Pedro de Cordoba as Atilio Castro
- Gareth Hughes as Spadoni
- Gladys Hulette as Vittoria
- William H. Thompson as Colonel Marcos
- William Collier, Jr. as Gaston
- Mario Majeroni as Duke DeDelille
- Betty Bouton as Alicia's maid
- Jeanne Brindeau as Madame Spadoni
- Ivan Linow as Terrorist
- Paul Panzer as Cossack
- Louis Wolheim as Undetermined Secondary Role (scenes deleted)
- Evelyn Arnold as Dancer (uncredited)
- Maxina Arnold as Dancer (uncredited)
- Constance Berry as Polish Beauty (uncredited)
- Arline Booth as Swedish Beauty (uncredited)
- Clara Bow as Girl Dancing on Table (uncredited)
- America Chedister as French Beauty (uncredited)
- Claire de Lorez as Anna (uncredited)
- Dorothy Dinsmore as Dancer (uncredited)
- Margaret Dumont as French Beauty (uncredited)
- Annette Earle as French Beauty (uncredited)
- Lou Gorey as French Beauty (uncredited)
- Hannelore as Dance Specialty (uncredited)
- Salzedo Harpists as Harp Ensemble (uncredited)
- Beatrice Keen as Dancer (uncredited)
- Joan Le Monte as Jewish Beauty (uncredited)
- Mary Mackintosh as Dancer (uncredited)
- Adolph Milar as Terrorist (uncredited)
- Marion Moorehouse as French Beauty (uncredited)
- Polly Nally as Sweden (uncredited)
- Mademoiselle Narcita as Hindu Beauty (uncredited)
- Mae Opreska as Russian Beauty (uncredited)
- Peggy Raymond as Dancer (uncredited)
- Jessie Reed as Dancer (uncredited)
- Addie Rolf as France (uncredited)
- Nellie Savage as Dancer (uncredited)
- Marie Shelton as Sweden (uncredited)
- Helen Stewart as French Beauty (uncredited)
- Vivian Vernon as Spain (uncredited)
- Virginia Whitehead as Dancer (uncredited)
- Helen Lee Worthing as Norwegian Beauty (uncredited)

== Production ==
Exteriors of the film were shot on location in Monte Carlo, Paris, and Nice. The rest of the film was shot at Cosmopolitan's production facility in Harlem.

== Preservation ==
A print of the film at the Library of Congress is believed to be incomplete, missing reels 3 and 9 of 11 total.

== See also ==
- List of partially lost films
- Lionel Barrymore filmography
