= St. Clair Township, Benton County, Iowa =

Township in Iowa, US

Saint Clair Township
- Township
- Location in Benton County
- Coordinates: 41°54′22″N 92°00′26″W
- Country: United States
- State: Iowa
- County: Benton

Area
  - Total: 35.82 sq mi (92.78 km^{2})
  - Land: 35.82 sq mi (92.78 km^{2})
  - Water: 0 sq mi (0 km^{2}) 0%
- Elevation: 840 ft (256 m)

Population (2000)
  - Total: 461
  - Density: 13/sq mi (5/km^{2})
- Time zone: UTC-6 (CST)
  - Summer (DST): UTC-5 (CDT)
- ZIP codes: 52209, 52301, 52354
- GNIS feature ID: 0468653

Saint Clair Township is one of twenty townships in Benton County, Iowa, United States. As of the 2000 census, its population was 461.

== Geography ==
According to the United States Census Bureau, Saint Clair Township covers an area of 35.82 square miles (92.78 square kilometers).

=== Adjacent townships ===
- Eldorado Township (north)
- Fremont Township (northeast)
- Florence Township (east)
- Lenox Township, Iowa County (southeast)
- Washington Township, Iowa County (south)
- Marengo Township, Iowa County (southwest)
- Leroy Township (west)
- Union Township (northwest)

== School districts ==
- Benton Community School District

== Political districts ==
- Iowa's 1st congressional district
- State House District 75
- State Senate District 38

== Notable people ==
- America Chedister (1895–1975), maiden name Cooney, actress and singer
