= Just Married (1928 film) =

1928 film

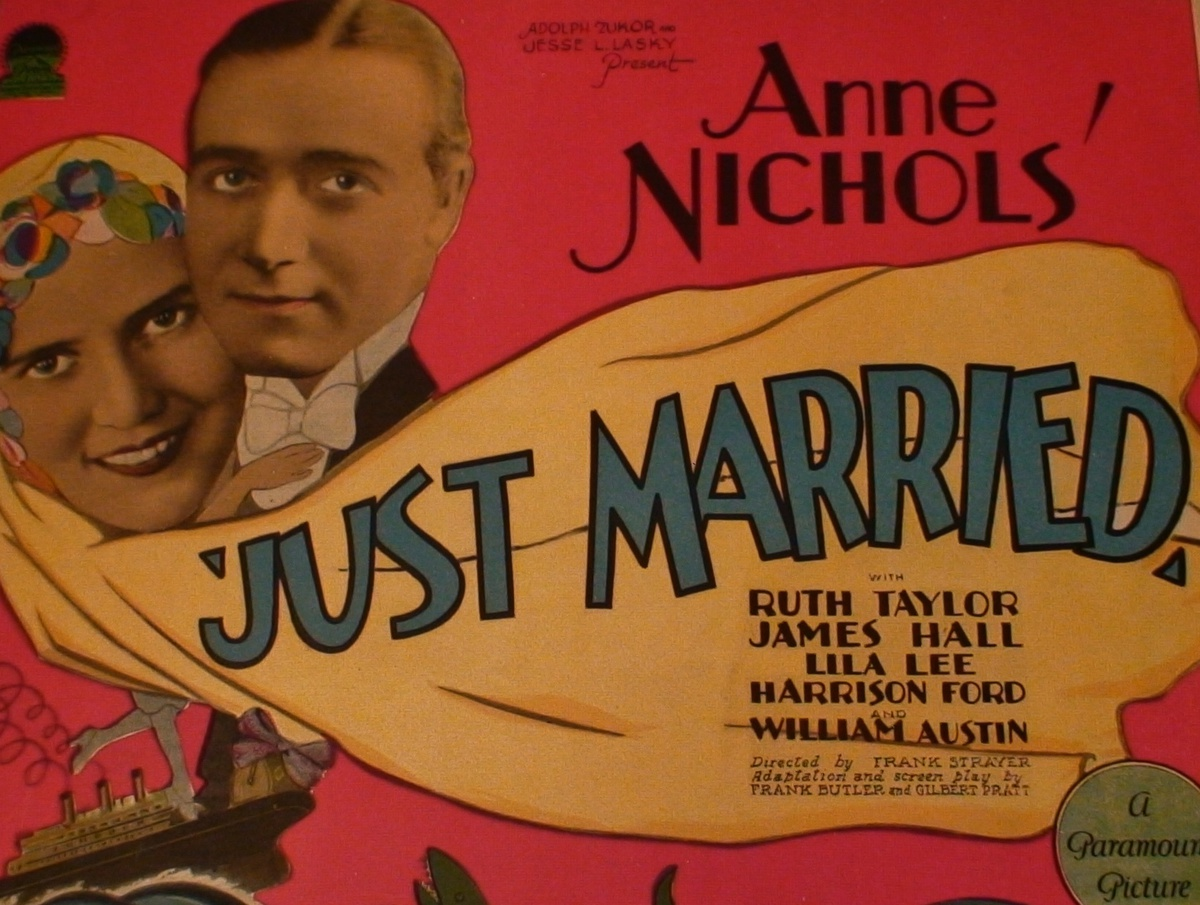
- Directed by: Frank R. Strayer
- Screenplay by: Frank Butler; George Marion Jr. Adelaide Matthews (play); Anne Nichols (play); Gilbert Pratt
- Produced by: Jesse L. Lasky; Adolph Zukor
- Starring: James Hall; Ruth Taylor; Harrison Ford; William Austin; Ivy Harris; Tom Ricketts; Maude Turner Gordon
- Cinematography: Edward Cronjager
- Edited by: William Shea; B. F. Zeidman
- Production company: Paramount Pictures
- Distributed by: Paramount Pictures
- Release date: August 18, 1928
- Running time: 63 minutes
- Country: United States
- Language: English

Just Married is a lost 1928 American comedy silent film directed by Frank R. Strayer and written by Frank Butler, George Marion Jr., and Gilbert Pratt. The film stars James Hall, Ruth Taylor, Harrison Ford, William Austin, Ivy Harris, Tom Ricketts and Maude Turner Gordon. The film was released on August 18, 1928, by Paramount Pictures. The film adapts the play of the same name by Adelaide Matthews and Anne Nichols.

== Plot ==
After many ridiculous moments, a young girl marries her former acquaintance, not her fiancée.

== Cast ==
- James Hall as Bob Adams
- Ruth Taylor as Roberta
- Harrison Ford as Jack Stanley
- William Austin as Percy Jones
- Ivy Harris as Mrs. Jack Stanley
- Tom Ricketts as Makepeace Witter
- Maude Turner Gordon as Mrs. Witter
- Lila Lee as Victoire
- Arthur Hoyt as Steward
- Wade Boteler as Purser
- Mario Carillo as Magnoir
