= The Awakening of Ruth =

1917 silent film

- Directed by: Edward H. Griffith
- Written by: Lucien Hubbard
- Starring: Shirley Mason; George J. Forth; Donald Hall
- Cinematography: Fred S. Brace
- Production companies: Perfection Pictures; Edison Studios
- Distributed by: George Kleine System
- Release date: September 17, 1917
- Running time: 50 minutes
- Country: United States
- Languages: Silent; English intertitles

The Awakening of Ruth is a 1917 American silent drama film directed by Edward H. Griffith and starring Shirley Mason, George J. Forth and Donald Hall.

Edward Lorusso produced the film for video in 2023 with a score by David Drazin.

== Plot ==
Ruth Hoagland lives on an island near Massachusetts, with only her father for company. Her father, Reuben, is a fisherman who spends his time searching for buried treasure. One day, Ruth meets a yachtsman named Bob Winthrop, who is vacationing on the island. Bob and Ruth fall in love, but Bob has to return to his home in New York. After a year, Bob has forgotten Ruth. Then, Ruth finds two chests in a cave. She also finds her father, unconscious from a fall from a cliff. Ruth goes to Massachusetts for help, finding Reverend Josiah Arbuthnot and Dr. William Strong. Upon their return, they find Ruth's father dead. Dr. Strong offers to marry Ruth, but she refuses, still waiting for Bob's return. She divides the chests with Dr. Strong and Reverend Arbuthnot. Dr. Strong, after discovering that the chests only have damp gunpowder, withdraws his savings. He gives the money to Ruth, telling her he got it from selling the items in the chests. He tells her to go to New York and develop her voice. After learning that Bob moved on, Ruth goes back to the island to get ready for Broadway. While back on the island, Ruth discovers the sacrifice Dr. Strong made.

== Cast ==
- Shirley Mason as Ruth Hoagland
- George J. Forth as Bob Winthrop
- Joseph Burke as Reuben Hoagland
- William T. Hayes as Reverend Josiah Arbuthnot
- Donald Hall as Dr. William Strong
- Sally Crute as Fay Harrington
- Jessie Stevens as Mrs. Greer
- Edward Elkas as Joseph Ulrich
- David Davies as Henri Ressori
- Carolyn Lee as Rosaline Fothergill

== Bibliography ==
- Matheson, Sue. The John Ford Encyclopedia. Rowman & Littlefield, 2019.
