= One Touch of Nature (1917 film) =

1917 silent film

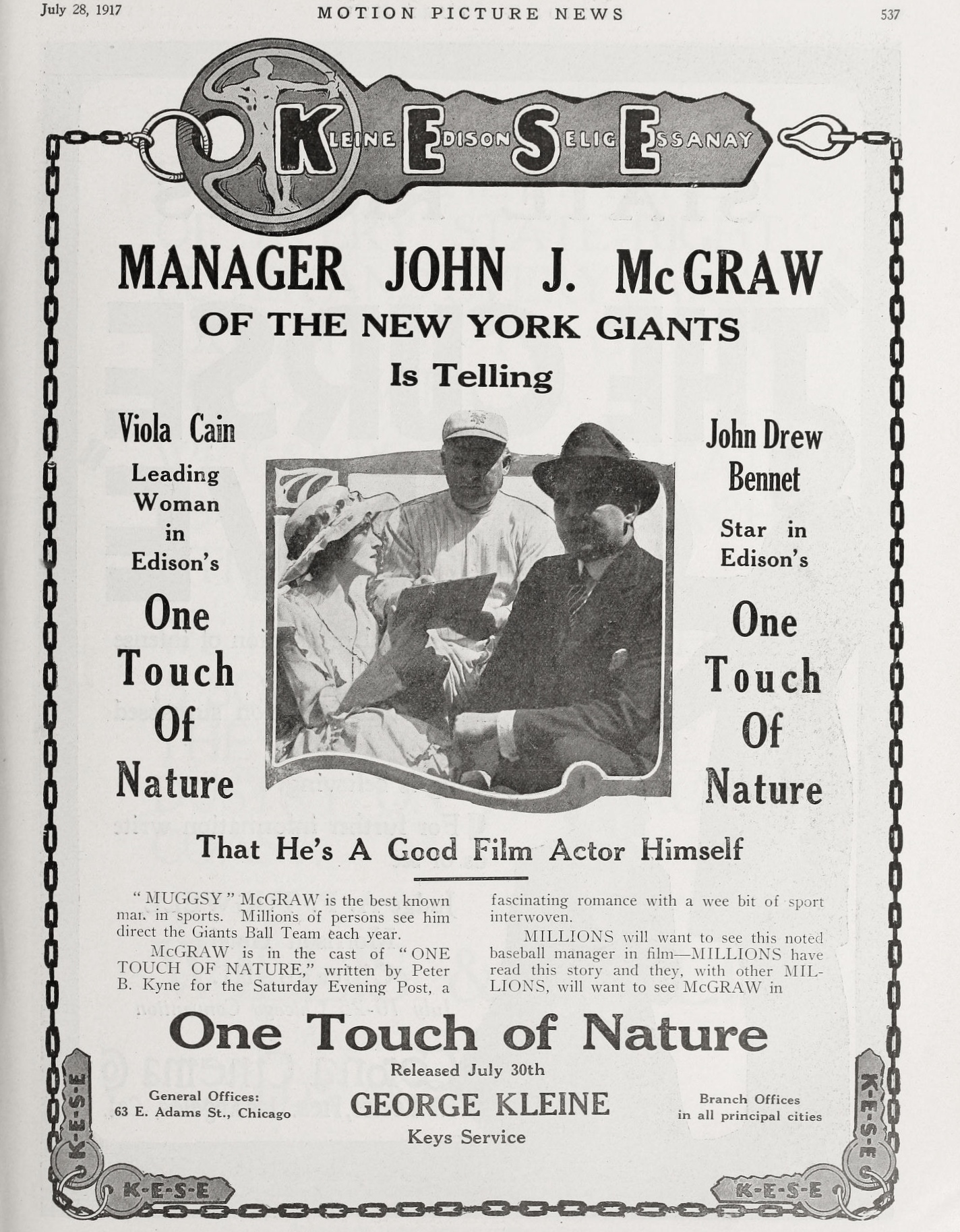
- Directed by: Edward H. Griffith
- Written by: Peter B. Kyne
- Produced by: George Kleine
- Cinematography: Charles E. Gilson
- Production company: Edison Studios
- Distributed by: K-E-S-E Service
- Release date: July 30, 1917
- Running time: 50 minutes
- Country: United States
- Languages: Silent; English intertitles

One Touch of Nature is a 1917 American silent comedy film directed by Edward H. Griffith and starring John Drew Bennett, Viola Cain and Edward O'Connor.

== Cast ==
- John Drew Bennett as William Vandervoort Cosgrove
- Viola Cain as Madame de Montignon
- Edward O'Connor as Shamus O'Brien
- John Henry as Old Man Cosgrove
- Helen Strickland as Mrs. Cosgrove
- John J. McGraw as Self

== Bibliography ==
- Robert B. Connelly. The Silents: Silent Feature Films, 1910-36, Volume 40, Issue 2. December Press, 1998.
