= Scrambled Wives =

1921 film by Edward H. Griffith

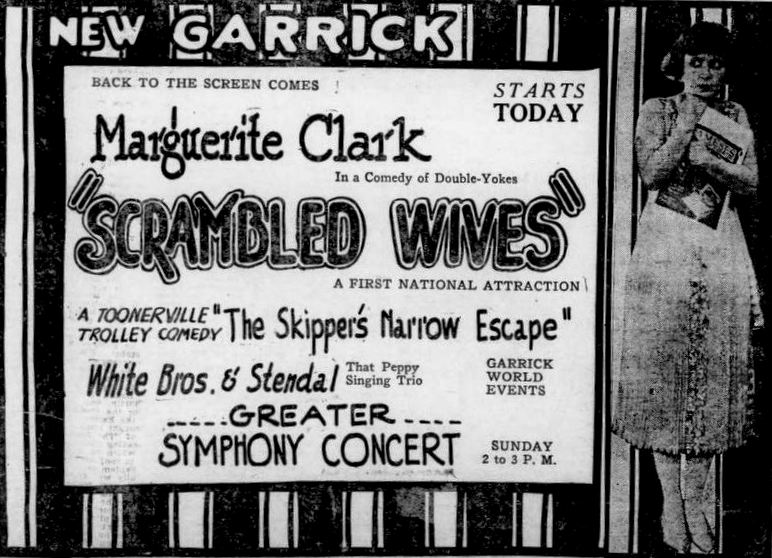
- Newspaper advertisement
- Directed by: Edward H. Griffith
- Written by: Gardner Hunting (scenario)
- Based on: The First Mrs. Chiverick by Adelaide Matthews
- Produced by: Marguerite Clark
- Starring: Marguerite Clark
- Cinematography: William McCoy; Ray June
- Distributed by: Associated First National
- Release date: March 1921
- Running time: 70 minutes
- Country: United States
- Language: Silent (English intertitles)

Scrambled Wives is a lost 1921 American silent comedy film produced by and starring Marguerite Clark. It was directed by Edward H. Griffith and released through Associated First National. This film had one color sequence, presumably a 1-strip Technicolor process being that Technicolor's Ray June is one of the camera operators. This film marks Clark's final screen performance. It is not known whether the film currently survives. This film is based on the play The First Mrs. Chiverick by Adelaide Matthews.

== Plot ==
Based on a description in a film publication, Mary Smith gives a party in her college room when John Chiverick is found in attendance. Because he has "compromised" her, John feels obligated to marry Mary. Immediately after the ceremony, Mary's father has the marriage annulled and sends Mary abroad. After two years she returns and sees her former husband at a Long Island house party. There is much concern about the disgrace that would be caused if her marriage annulment were to become public knowledge. Larry McCleod is at the party and is in love with Mary, although he believes that she is a widow. She accepts his proposal after confessing her situation.

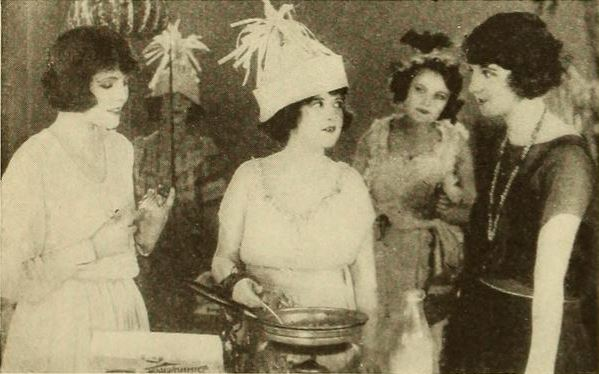
Film still of the house party

== Cast ==
- Marguerite Clark as Miss Mary Lucille Smith
- Pierre Gendron as Larry McCleod
- Ralph Bunker as John Chiverick
- Florence Martin as Bessie
- Virginia Lee as Beatrice Lee
- Alice Mann as Connie Chiverick
- Frank Badgley as Dickie Van Arsdale
- America Chedister as Mrs. Halsey
- John Mayer as Mr. Halsey
- John Washburn as Mr. Smith
- Thomas Braidon as The Butler
- Ada Neville as Mrs. Spencer
- Emma Wilcox as Dot
