= Leotta Whytock =

American film editor and actress

- Born: Leotta Edith Wotton; March 27, 1890; Fresno, California, U.S.
- Died: October 13, 1972 (aged 82); Los Angeles, California, U.S.
- Occupation(s): Film editor, actress
- Spouse: Grant Whytock (m. 1918)
- Relatives: Mary Carlisle (niece); Ora Carew (sister-in-law)

Leotta Edith Whytock (née Wotton; March 27, 1890 – October 13, 1972) was an American film editor and actress active during the early days of Hollywood. She was married to fellow film editor Grant Whytock.

== Biography ==
Whytock was born in Fresno, California, to Robert Wotton and Mary Johnston, both of whom were native Canadians. Her father died when she was young. She had a twin sister, Leona (an actress); a brother, Clarence; and a half-brother, Robert Carlisle. She and her sister seem to have worked as actresses during the silent era.

She married fellow film editor Grant Whytock on June 1, 1918 after moving to Los Angeles. Through this marriage, her sister-in-law was actress Ora Carew. At one point, she was a film editor at Ingram Studios in Nice, France. Though her credits end in the 1920s, it seems she was an assistant editor for much of her later career.

Her half-brother, Robert Carlisle, ended up becoming a film producer at MGM; her twin sister Leona's daughter, Mary Carlisle, became a famous actress and lived to the age of 104.

== Selected filmography ==
- Stranded (1927)
- A Million for Love (1928)
- The House of Deceit (1928)
- Burning Up Broadway (1928)
