= Prisoners (1929 film) =

1929 film directed by William A. Seiter

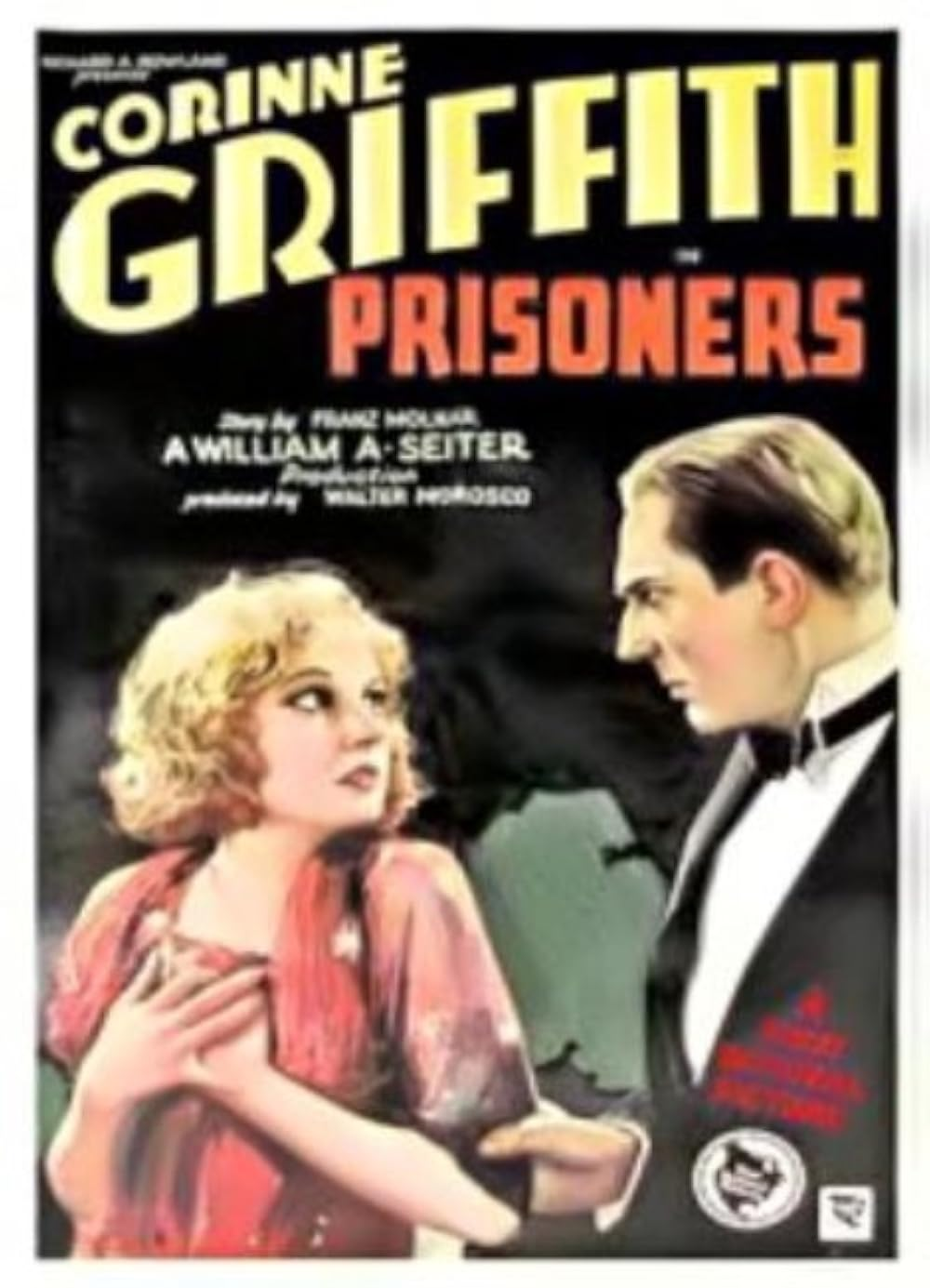
- Theatrical release poster
- Directed by: William A. Seiter
- Written by: Forrest Halsey
- Based on: Rabok novel by Ferenc Molnar
- Produced by: Walter Morosco; Richard A. Rowland
- Starring: Corinne Griffith; James Ford; Bela Lugosi; Ian Keith
- Cinematography: Lee Garmes
- Edited by: LeRoy Stone
- Production company: First National Pictures
- Distributed by: First National Pictures
- Release date: May 19, 1929
- Running time: 87 minutes (8 reels)
- Country: United States
- Languages: Sound (Part-Talkie); English Intertitles

Prisoners is a 1929 American sound part-talkie film produced by Walter Morosco and directed by William Seiter for First National Pictures. In addition to sequences with audible dialogue or talking sequences, the film features a synchronized musical score and sound effects along with English intertitles. According to the film review in Variety, 10 percent of the total running time featured dialogue. The sound was recorded via the Vitaphone sound-on-disc process. The screenplay was written by Forrest Halsey, based on the novel by Ferenc Molnar. Lee Garmes was the cinematographer.

The film stars Corinne Griffith, James Ford, Bela Lugosi, Ian Keith, and Otto Matiesen. Lugosi, in his first talkie, played Brottos, the owner of a Vienna nightclub. Lugosi was very happy that his first sound film was set in Hungary (where he was born) and that the story was based on a Ferenc Molnar Hungarian novel. While Lugosi was off filming "Prisoners", he was temporarily replaced in the San Francisco "Dracula" stage play by one Frederick Pymm (who normally played Butterworth, the attendant).

The relatively short segment with dialogue (most of the film has intertitles with music) picks up with the climactic trial sequence. Critics stated "Bela Lugosi makes a very European villain", but were disappointed that Griffith's character is sent off to prison at the end of the film while a "cold-blooded murderer (in one of the subplots) is kept from receiving his just punishment". Corinne Griffith (who was married to producer Morosco) later went on to become a movie producer herself, as well as a very successful novelist.

== Plot ==
Riza Riga, a beautiful young showgirl has led a life of crime, but she wants to go straight. When she falls in love with attorney Nicholas Cathy, she plans to gain his attention by buying a beautiful new dress. But when she realizes she can't afford to buy it, she returns to crime.

She steals some money and is caught redhanded, resulting in a criminal trial. Defense lawyer Cathy winds up defending the young girl and falls in love with her in the process. Lugosi as Brottos, the nightclub owner, lurks throughout the film in villainous fashion. In the end, Riza is found guilty and is sentenced to three months in jail, and Nicholas Cathy watches her as she is led off to prison, promising to wait for her faithfully.

== Cast ==
- Corinne Griffith as Riza Riga, a showgirl and thief
- James Ford as Kessler
- Bela Lugosi as Brottos, a Vienna nightclub owner (as "The Man" in the film script)
- Ian Keith as Nicholas Cathy, the defense attorney
- Harry Northrup as the prosecuting attorney
- Julanne Johnston as Lenke
- Ann Schaeffer as Aunt Maria (*Anne Schaefer)
- Barton Hesse as Kore
- Otto Matiesen as Sebfi

== Music ==
The film features a theme song entitled "When My Dream Of Love Comes True" which was composed by Norman Spencer and Herman Ruby.

== Preservation ==
This is now a lost film.

== See also ==
- List of early sound feature films (1926–1929)
