= Another Dawn (1937 film) =

1937 film by William Dieterle

- Lobby Card
- Directed by: William Dieterle
- Screenplay by: Laird Doyle
- Based on: Caesar's Wife by W. Somerset Maugham
- Produced by: Harry Joe Brown; Jack L. Warner; Hal B. Wallis
- Starring: Kay Francis; Errol Flynn; Ian Hunter
- Cinematography: Tony Gaudio
- Edited by: Ralph Dawson
- Music by: Erich Wolfgang Korngold
- Production company: Warner Bros. Pictures
- Distributed by: Warner Bros. Pictures
- Release date: June 18, 1937
- Running time: 73 minutes
- Country: United States
- Language: English
- Budget: $552,000
- Box office: $1,045,000

Another Dawn (also known as Caesar's Wife) is a 1937 American melodrama film directed by William Dieterle and starring Errol Flynn, Kay Francis and Ian Hunter. It is based on Somerset Maugham's 1919 play Caesar's Wife. It was produced and distributed by Warner Bros. Pictures. The film received dismissive reviews.

== Plot ==
Colonel John Wister (Ian Hunter) is in charge of a post in the British desert colony of Dickit. While on leave in England he meets and falls in love with the beautiful American Julia Ashton (Kay Francis), whose aviator fiancé disappeared in his plane and presumably died. Although Julia does not love John, she likes him and agrees to his marriage proposal.

John takes Julia to Dickit, where she meets John's best friend, Captain Denny Roark (Errol Flynn), and Denny's sister, Grace (Frieda Inescort), who is secretly in love with John. Denny reminds Julia of her dead fiancé and the two of them fall in love. John discovers this; although he would give her a divorce, he knows that she is too decent to leave him.

A subplot involves Private Wilkins, guilty of cowardice, given a second chance by the Colonel and abused by the other enlisted men, who present him with a box full of white feathers. On an expedition led by Roark, Wilkins “picks up his white feathers” and dies defending his comrades.

An uprising by local Arabs means that one of the soldiers must fly a suicidal bombing mission. Denny volunteers, but as he is saying good bye to Julia, John takes off instead, sacrificing his life so that his best friend and wife can be together.

== Cast ==
- Kay Francis as Julia Ashton Wister
- Errol Flynn as Capt. Denny Roark
- Ian Hunter as Col. John Wister
- Frieda Inescort as Grace Roark
- Herbert Mundin as Wilkins, Col. Wister's Orderly
- G. P. Huntley as Lord Alden
- Billy Bevan as Pte. Hawkins
- Clyde Cook as Sgt. Murphy
- Richard Powell as Pte. Henderson
- Kenneth Hunter as Sir Charles Benton
- Mary Forbes as Lady Lynda Benton
- Eily Malyon as Mrs. Farnold

== Production ==
=== Development ===
Somerset Maugham's play Caesar's Wife was first performed in 1919, starring C. Aubrey Smith. It concerned Sir Arthur Little, a British consulate agent in Cairo, who married a 19-year-old wife, Violet. Violet likes Little but falls in love with his private secretary, Ronald Perry. The play was filmed in 1928 as Infatuation, starring Corinne Griffith.

Warners bought the rights to Caesar's Wife in late 1935. Errol Flynn had just impressed the studio with his performance in Captain Blood, and he was announced as the male lead of Caesar's Wife in February 1936.

In March, it was announced Flynn and Bette Davis would co-star in Another Dawn and that the film would be set in Iraq, with Laird Doyle, who had written Dangerous, doing the script. Doyle would receive an original story credit for the film, with no attribution being given to Maugham, although the film also dealt with a love triangle between two friends and the wife of one of them in a colonial outpost.

Ian Hunter later joined as the third star. In June, Warners announced that the film would be one of their "special productions" for the following year.

Flynn insisted that Warner Bros give him three months off after the production so he could travel to Borneo and take footage for a film based on a story of his own, The White Rajah.

Then Davis went on suspension, forcing Warners to find other actors to take over her roles. Tallulah Bankhead was announced for Another Dawn but The New York Times said this casting was "subject to change without notice." Eventually Warners decided to give the role to Kay Francis; William Dieterle was to direct.

"I don't do much in it," said Francis. "Things just happen about me. I am just a wife who has been unfortunate in love, as usual."

=== Shooting ===
Filming of Another Dawn took place on the Warners backlot at Lasky Mesa, in Calabasas, California, with action sequences also shot in Yuma, Arizona. Flynn apparently wrecked his ankle while playing tennis during the making of the film and required hospitalization. Francis also missed three days filming due to toxic poisoning.

William Dieterle, in a memo to Hal Wallis dated July 21, 1938, claimed he did not want to make the film but did it as a favour to producer Hal Wallis. Errol Flynn did not want to make the film either, and he did not like working for William Dieterle. He was also negotiating with Warner Bros. for a new contract and on one occasion refused to come out of his trailer.

Filming began September 26, 1936, but Francis was exhausted after making back-to-back pictures, and it was showing up in the footage. Warners was interrupted when an exhausted Francis went in holiday in Europe in November 1936. It resumed and was completed in February 1937.

Erich Wolfgang Korngold was so pleased with his theme music for this production that he used it in the first movement of the Violin Concerto he wrote some years later.

== Reception ==
According to Warner Bros records, Another Dawn earned $572,000 domestically (in the US and Canada) and $473,000 overseas.

Generally, critical reviews were dismissive, saying that the film was mainly notable for its "haunting score" rather than its actors or story.

In her September 1, 1937, review for Macleans, Ann Ross observed that the film is “an oid-fashioned problem drama, presenting Kay Francis in the usual set of mournful predicaments, the usual outfit of wonderful clothes. She… marries Colonel John Wister (Ian Hunter), assuring him that “every woman who is honest with herself knows that she can only love once.” She goes with him to a desert outpost where she meets Captain Denny Roark (Errol Flynn), and recognizes at once that every woman who is honest with herself knows that it's possible to make a mistake. Things intensify rapidly, what with stifled passion, fighting Arabs and raging siroccos. In the end Colonel Wister flies away on a suicide mission, leaving the lovers facing another dawn. There's nothing very new about Miss Francis’ latest picture except the star's wardrobe. Even in the middle of an Arabian sandstorm, she's still the screen's best-dressed woman.”

=== Follow-up ===
In 1939 Warners announced Flynn and Geraldine Fitzgerald would star in The Outpost, adapted from Caesar's Wife by Somerset Maugham and directed by Michael Curtiz. Eventually announcements stated that Flynn had been replaced by Cary Grant. Warners was advertising the film as late as 1941, but apparently it was never made.
