= Caesar's Wife (play) =

1919 play by W. Somerset Maugham

Caesar's Wife is a 1919 play by the British writer Somerset Maugham. Its West End run at the Royalty Theatre in London lasted for 241 performances from 27 March to 25 October 1919. Amongst the original cast were C. Aubrey Smith, Fay Compton, George Relph, and Helen Haye.

The title presumably refers to Pompeia, one of the wives of Julius Caesar.

== Film adaptations ==
In 1925 the play was adapted into an American film Infatuation directed by Irving Cummings and starring Corinne Griffith and Percy Marmont. Another version was produced in 1937 under the title Another Dawn. It was directed by William Dieterle and starred Errol Flynn and Kay Francis.

== Bibliography ==
- Goble, Alan. The Complete Index to Literary Sources in Film. Walter de Gruyter, 1999.
- Wearing, J.P. The London Stage 1910-1919: A Calendar of Productions, Performers, and Personnel.. Rowman & Littlefield, 2013.
