= Back Pay (1930 film) =

1930 film directed by William A. Seiter

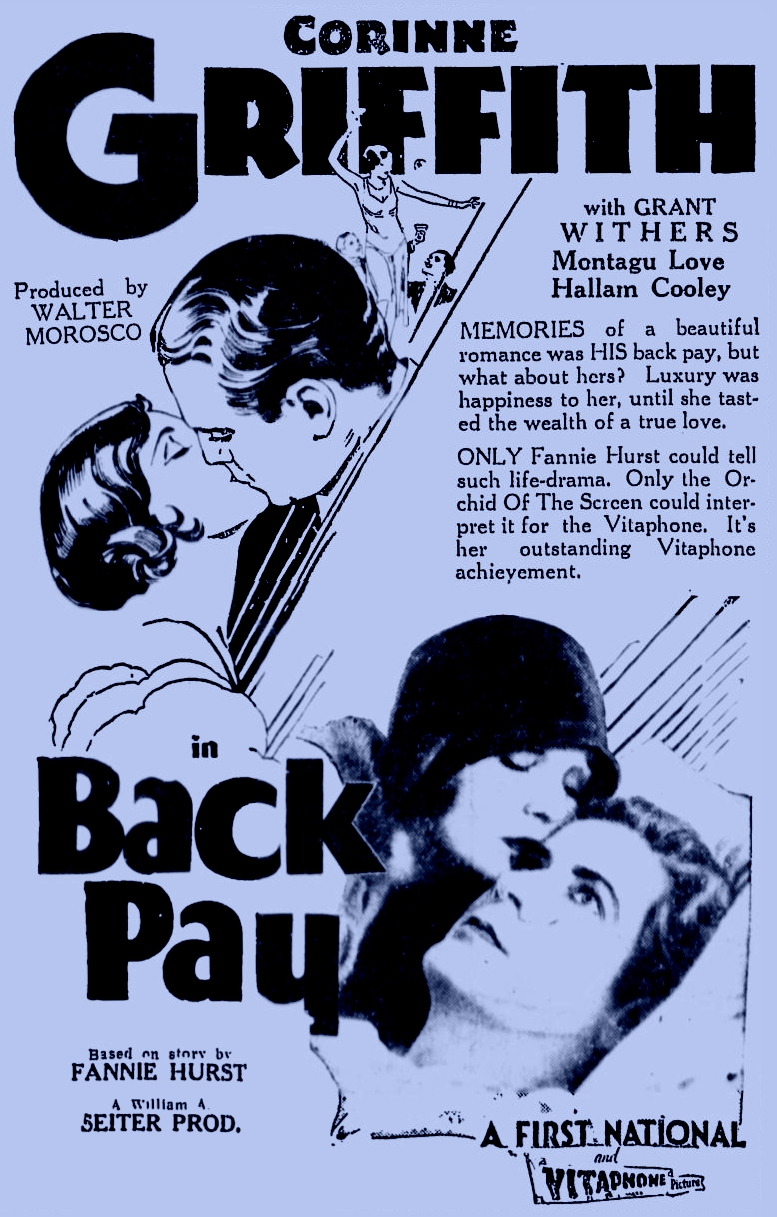
- Pressbook advertisement
- Directed by: William A. Seiter
- Screenplay by: Francis Edward Faragoh
- Story by: Fannie Hurst
- Produced by: Walter Morosco; William A. Seiter
- Starring: Corinne Griffith; Grant Withers
- Cinematography: John F. Seitz
- Edited by: Ray Curtiss
- Music by: Cecil Copping; Alois Reiser
- Production company: First National Pictures
- Distributed by: Warner Bros. Pictures
- Release date: June 1, 1930 (United States)
- Running time: 57 minutes
- Country: United States
- Language: English

Back Pay is a 1930 American pre-Code drama film with songs, produced and distributed by First National Pictures, a subsidiary of Warner Bros. Pictures, and starring Corinne Griffith and Grant Withers. It is based on a short story by Fannie Hurst. It is a remake of a 1922 silent film Back Pay that starred Seena Owen.

A woman leaves her hometown and her boyfriend, and becomes a kept woman in New York. Her former boyfriend returns from a war, blind and with injured lungs. The woman attempts to nurse him back to health, although she has been warned that he is dying.

== Plot ==
Back Pay (1930)

Hester Bevins is tired of living in the small town where she has lived all her life. Although she has a boyfriend, Gerald Smith, who is in love with her, she deserts him and takes a train to New York with a traveling salesman. Bevins meets a rich older man, Charles Wheeler, who provides her with all the luxuries she wants in return for being his girlfriend. One day, Bevins' friends invite her on a motor trip to Hot Springs, which is about 30 mi (48 km) from her old hometown, which she decides to visit.

She encounters Smith, who, thinking that she is still single and has a job in the city, proposes marriage, but she refuses saying that it is now impossible. Disillusioned, he signs up for the war and ends up being gassed, suffering lung damage and blindness. When the news reaches Bevins, she immediately goes to see him and attempts to nurse him back to health. When the doctor tells her that Smith has only a short time left to live, Bevins asks Wheeler's permission to marry Smith before he dies. She finds peace and happiness in her brief relationship with Smith. After Smith dies in her arms, Bevins decides to end her sordid relationship with Wheeler and return to working for a living.

== Cast ==
- Corinne Griffith as Hester Bevins
- Grant Withers as Gerald Smith
- Montagu Love as Charles G. Wheeler
- Hallam Cooley as Al Bloom
- Vivien Oakland as Kitty (as Vivian Oakland)
- Geneva Mitchell as Babe
- William Bailey as Ed

== Songs ==
- "They Didn't Believe Me", performed by Corrine Griffith, composed by Jerome Kern

== Preservation ==
Back Pay has been shown on television and cable. It was released on DVD by the Warner Archive Collection in 2012.
