= Back Pay (1922 film) =

1922 film by Frank Borzage

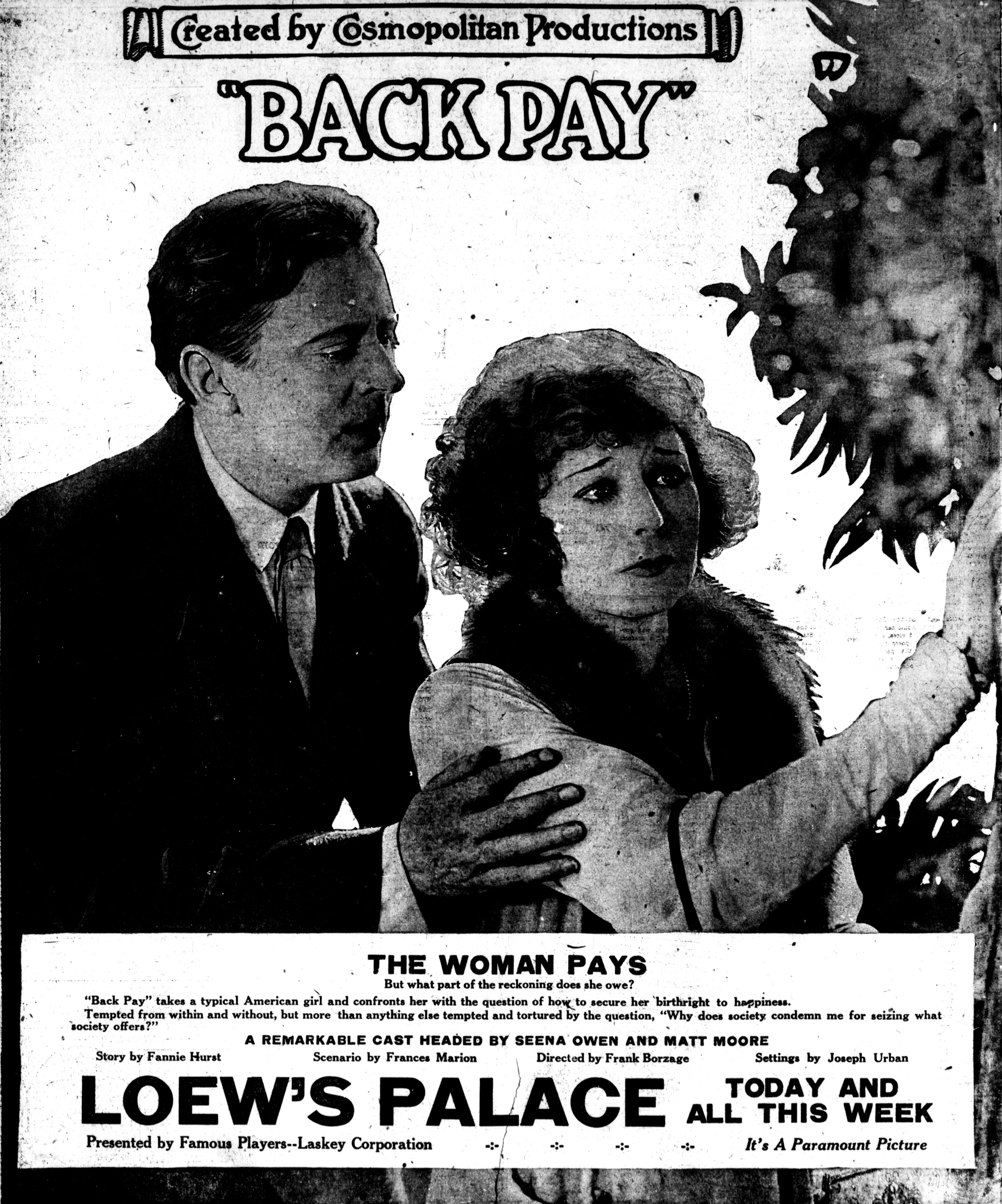
- Newspaper advertisement
- Directed by: Frank Borzage
- Written by: Frances Marion
- Based on: Back Pay by Fannie Hurst
- Produced by: William Randolph Hearst (for Cosmopolitan Productions)
- Starring: Seena Owen; Matt Moore
- Cinematography: Chester A. Lyons
- Distributed by: Paramount Pictures
- Release date: January 8, 1922
- Running time: 70 minutes; 7 reels (6,460 feet)
- Country: United States
- Language: Silent (English intertitles)

Back Pay

Back Pay is an extant 1922 American silent drama film directed by Frank Borzage, produced by Cosmopolitan Productions and distributed through Paramount Pictures. It is based on a short story of the same name by Fannie Hurst, and stars Seena Owen.

It was remade in 1930 as Back Pay starring Corinne Griffith.

== Plot ==
As described in a film magazine, Hester Bevins, a young country girl, is loved by grocery store clerk Jerry Newcombe. When he begs her to marry him, she refuses as she cannot bring herself to become his wife and settle down in a humdrum town. Hester decides to go to New York City and make her way. Some time later, she is in a beautiful Riverside Drive apartment in New York City that is provided for her by wealthy businessman Charles G. Wheeler. Associated with her are her companions Kitty and Speed, and Hester has changed considerably from her small town roots. Her life with Charles and his companions grows wearisome and she longs to see her home town once again, and she accomplishes this while on an automobile trip with Charles, Kitty, and Speed. She discovers that many of the townspeople have forgotten her, and Jerry is the only one she is anxious to see. She finds that he is still devoted to her and is now the manager of the store. After the visit, Jerry enlists and goes to France with the American Expeditionary Forces in World War I. Later, Hester learns that Jerry lies badly wounded in an army hospital and wears the Distinguished Service Cross. She hurries to the hospital and finds him blind and deliriously calling for her. A surgeon tells her that Jerry has but three weeks to live, and Hester decides to make him happy for that short time. After a struggle, she gains Charles' permission for her to marry Jerry and bring him to the apartment. After they are married, she nurses him. Jerry is confident of his recovery and plans great things for their future, but he soon dies. Hester now finds her kept life in the apartment unbearable. She is tormented at night by visions of Jerry calling her away from her surroundings. Moved by these visions, she leaves the home Charles has furnished for her and rents a poorly furnished room. When she obtains a position with honest work, Jerry again appears to her and comforts her in her new and upright life.

== Cast ==
- Seena Owen as Hester Bevins
- Matt Moore as Jerry Newcombe
- J. Barney Sherry as Charles G. Wheeler
- Ethel Duray as Kitty
- Charles Craig as Speed
- Jerry Sinclair as Thomas Craig

== Preservation ==
The film is preserved in the Library of Congress collection.

== See also ==
- Chemical weapons in World War I
