= The Garden of Eden (1928 film) =

1928 film

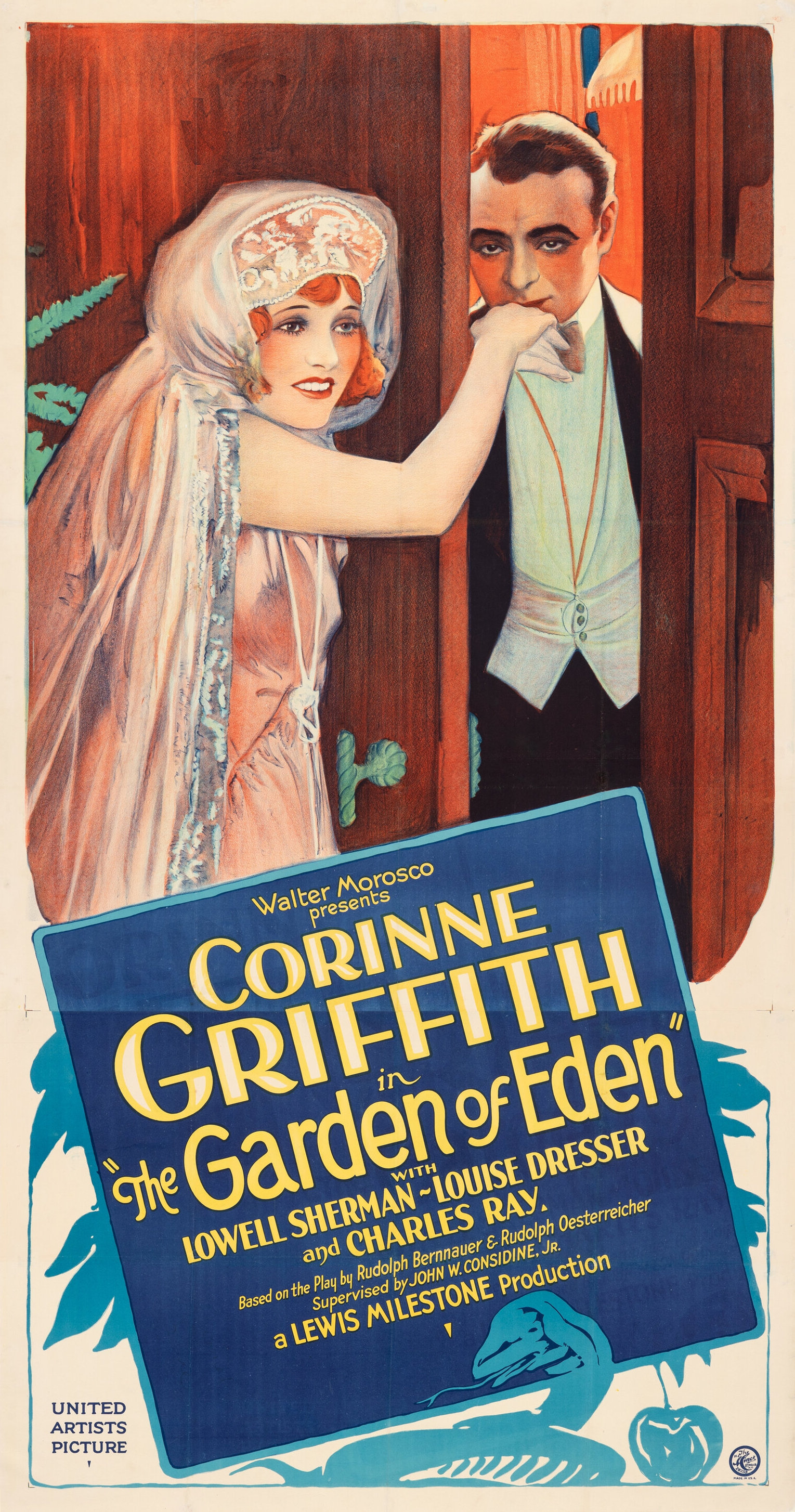
- Lobby poster
- Directed by: Lewis Milestone
- Written by: Hanns Kräly
- Based on: Der Garten Eden, Komödie 1926 play by Rudolf Bernauer; The Garden of Eden 1927 play adapted into English by Avery Hopwood
- Produced by: John W. Considine Jr. Lewis Milestone
- Starring: Corinne Griffith; Louise Dresser; Lowell Sherman
- Cinematography: John Arnold
- Edited by: John Orlando
- Music by: Robert Israel
- Production company: Feature Productions
- Distributed by: United Artists
- Release date: February 4, 1928
- Running time: 79 minutes
- Country: United States
- Language: Silent (English intertitles)
- Budget: $700,000

The Garden of Eden is a 1928 American silent comedy drama film directed by Lewis Milestone and starring Corinne Griffith, Louise Dresser, and Lowell Sherman. It was adapted from Avery Hopwood's short-lived stage production of the same name.

Full film

== Plot ==
Toni LeBrun, a Viennese ingénue, is determined not to be content in her current life, staying with her aunt and uncle and working in their pretzel bakery. The young girl earns a correspondence course degree as an opera singer and dreams of fame on the stage. She decides to leave her small-town life, traveling to Budapest to answer an ad from the Palais de Paris. However, the ad was a sham, a way to get young women for cheap stage shows and for the use of its wealthier clientele.

When she arrives, Toni is confused when the manager, the lecherous (and quite possibly lesbian) Madame Bauer, asks her to show her bare legs in lieu of exhibiting her singing voice. She is hired nonetheless, having been deemed sexy enough, while still ignorant of the set-up. She refuses to wear the skimpy costume assigned and is given a white puritan-style costume instead. Before the show, the manager greets aristocrat Henri D'Avril, giving him a menu (of sorts) of the showgirls from which to choose. When he asks if there is anyone new, he is directed to Toni's name on the program. When Toni begins her performance in earnest, the audience starts to slumber, given her conservative dress. But the manager directs a lighting change, which causes her translucent clothing to become highly revealing and nearly see-through. Through their reaction, Toni realizes what has happened and runs off the stage where she is comforted by the wardrobe woman Rosa, the only friend she's made since arriving in the city.

However, Madame Bauer is not through with Toni yet, she has arranged a rendezvous for her with D’Avril in a room off the stage. Once locked inside with Toni, he quickly tries to take advantage. She struggles against his advances which are heard by Rosa, who is able to come to her rescue. When Madame Bauer discovers that her client did not get what he wanted, she fires Toni and Rosa on the spot. Conveniently, Rosa was about to leave on a two-week vacation anyway and persuades the forlorn Toni to go with her. They go to Monte Carlo, but Toni is now suspicious of other people's motives. So when Rosa signs the Eden Hotel register as "Baroness & her daughter", Toni accuses her of being no better than Madame Bauer. However, Rosa has documentation which proves that she is in fact a Baroness, and tells Toni that she signed the registration that way because she wishes it were so. Only much of her fortune was lost after the First World War and she can only afford such trips by living frugally for the rest of the year.

Later, when Toni is playing the piano in her room, she is spotted through the window from across the courtyard by Richard. In an amusing scene, he tries to get her attention by signaling her, turning the lights on and off in his room. As a gag, she responds with same, causing everyone else on his entire side of the hotel to do it too. When Rosa sees it, she stops the nonsense. However, Richard then decides to call Toni's room, but Rosa answers and decides to invite him over to put a stop to it. She plays the piano while she waits for Richard to arrive. But he arrives at Rosa's door, where Toni is. Tired of unwanted suitors, she appears uninterested in his flirting, yet does not reveal him when Rosa returns and he hides behind a door. Colonel Dupont arrives to call on Rosa, but is instantly entranced by Toni. In the doorway, he asks the two ladies to dinner which is witnessed by Richard, who just moments earlier had escaped from their room via another door. Upon hearing their acceptance, Richard joins them, revealing that the Colonel is his uncle. After the dinner, Richard takes Toni for a walk through the hotel's grounds and garden (the title of the film) and they fall in love, losing track of the time.

The rest of the film has Toni being wooed by both Richard and his uncle with a song one of them wrote on the piano. However, there is a surprise involving D'Avril which threatens Toni's happy ending.

== Cast ==
- Corinne Griffith as Toni LeBrun
- Louise Dresser as Rosa
- Lowell Sherman as Henri D'Avril
- Maude George as Madame Bauer
- Charles Ray as Richard Dupont / Spanyi
- Edward Martindel as Colonel Dupont
- Carrie Daumery as One of Richard's Aunts
- Eric Mayne as One of Richard's Uncles
- Hank Mann as Railroad Conductor
- Dot Farley as Monte Carlo Telephone Operator
- Tenen Holtz as Headwaiter at Palais de Paris

== Censorship ==
Film censors in Montreal required the end of the film be cut from where Toni in anger removes her wedding dress, leaving the audience wondering what happened.

== Preservation ==
A print of The Garden of Eden is preserved in the Library of Congress collection. Prints are also held by the George Eastman Museum Motion Picture Collection, UCLA Film and Television Archive, and Filmoteca de Catalunya in Barcelona.
