= Love's Wilderness =

1924 film by Robert Zigler Leonard

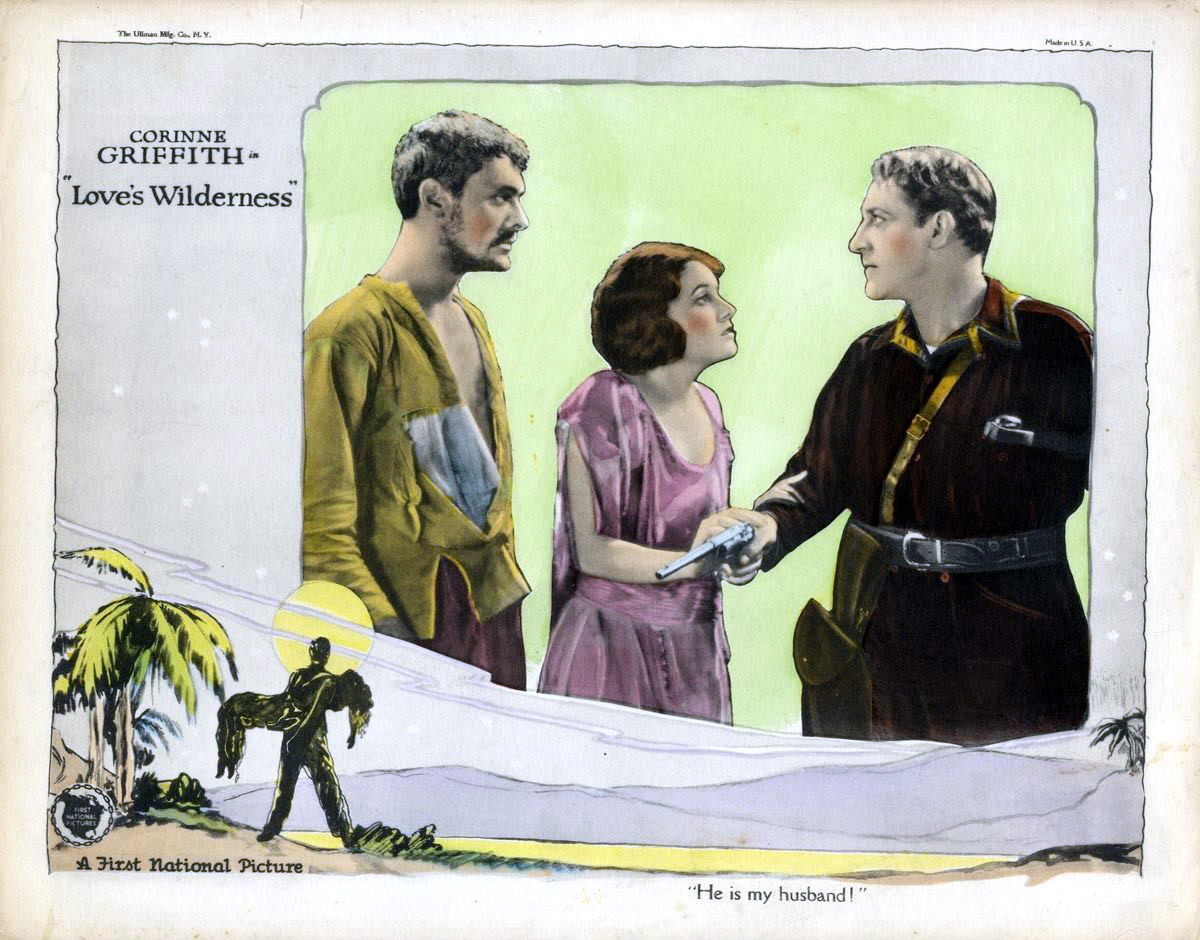
- Lobby card
- Directed by: Robert Z. Leonard
- Screenplay by: Helen Klumph; Eve Unsell
- Based on: Wilderness by Helen Campbell
- Starring: Corinne Griffith; Holmes Herbert; Ian Keith; Maurice de Canonge; Emily Fitzroy; Anne Schaefer
- Cinematography: Oliver T. Marsh
- Production company: Corinne Griffith Productions
- Distributed by: First National Pictures
- Release date: December 14, 1924
- Running time: 70 minutes
- Country: United States
- Language: Silent (English intertitles)

Love's Wilderness is a 1924 American silent drama film directed by Robert Z. Leonard and written by Helen Klumph and Eve Unsell. The film stars Corinne Griffith, Holmes Herbert, Ian Keith, Maurice de Canonge, Emily Fitzroy, and Anne Schaefer. The film was released on December 14, 1924, by First National Pictures.

== Plot ==
As described in a review in a film magazine, Linda Lou, reared in a small Louisiana town by her strict aunts, loves David who refuses to consider her as grown up and still regards her as a child. David goes to the penal colony La Diable to do work for the French government and only occasionally wires to Linda Lou. In the meantime, Paul, a wanderer, returns home, flatters Linda Lou, and finally marries her, taking her to a bleak farm in Canada. Feeling the call of adventure, he sends word he is dead and goes on an expedition with Captain Moreau, which ends with their being sent to Diable under life imprisonment. David returns and marries Linda Lou and they go back to La Diable. During an escape of prisoners during a rainstorm, Paul finds Linda Lou, who is lost. David finds them together and believes she still loves Paul, but gets clemency for him on account of his aiding Linda Lou. Just as she has decided to leave, David brings word that Moreau has killed Paul, and David takes Linda Lou in his arms when she explains it was love for the baby that died and not for Paul that caused her to want to help him.

== Cast ==
- Corinne Griffith as Linda Lou Heath
- Holmes Herbert as David Tennant
- Ian Keith as Paul L'Estrange
- Maurice de Canonge as Pierre Bazin
- Emily Fitzroy as Matilda Heath
- Anne Schaefer as Prudence Heath
- Bruce Covington as Colonel Heath
- David Torrence as The Governor
- Frank Elliott as Van Arsdale
- Adolph Milar as Captain Moreau
- Jim Blackwell as Jubilo
- William H. Post as Lamaire
- Stella De Lanti as Extra (uncredited)
- Christina Montt as Extra (uncredited)

== Preservation ==
A fragment of a print of Love's Wilderness is held by George Eastman House.
