= William James Hurlbut =

William James Hurlbut (1878 or July 13, 1883 – May 4, 1957) was a playwright, screenwriter, and artist.

The grandson of Stephen Augustus Hurlbut, his father served as mayor of Belvidere, Illinois and invented an "instantaneous camera". William Hurlbut was involved in local theater productions and graduated from Belvidere High School. He traveled with his family to New York with a stop in Peru while the Panama Canal was being constructed. In 1896 he was listed as a student at Washington University in St. Louis's School of Fine Arts.

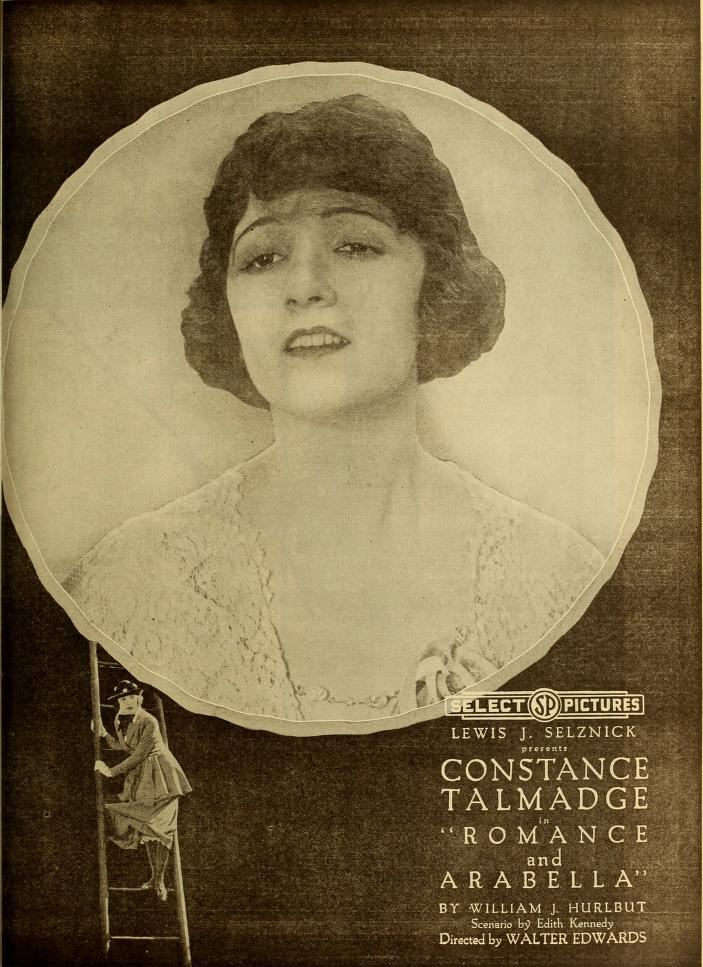
Advertisement for the film Romance and Arabella

His plays had female leads. One of his plays was about tenement life. Another was about a girlfriend from Europe coming to a town in America.

He was sued for making alterations and subletting a New York City apartment. He never married and had no children.

== Theater ==
- The Fighting Hope (1908), produced by David Belasco
- The Writing on the Wall (1909), produced by Olga Nethersole
- New York (1910)
- The Strange Woman (1914)
- Saturday to Monday (1917)
- Bride of the Lamb (1926)
- Engaged; A Farcical Comedy in Three Acts (1926)
- On the Stars (1931)
- Recessional (1931)
- Lover for Two (1936), co-wrote
- Trimmed in Scarlet
- Half a Husband; A Comedy in Four Acts
- "Very Rich,";A Group Portrait Comedy
- Lady Bridget
- A Lincolnshire Idyll
- Lillies of the Field

== Films ==
- The Fighting Hope (1915) based on his play
- The Dawn of Freedom (1916)
- The Writing in the Wall (1916)
- The Strange Woman (1918)
- Romance and Arabella (1919)

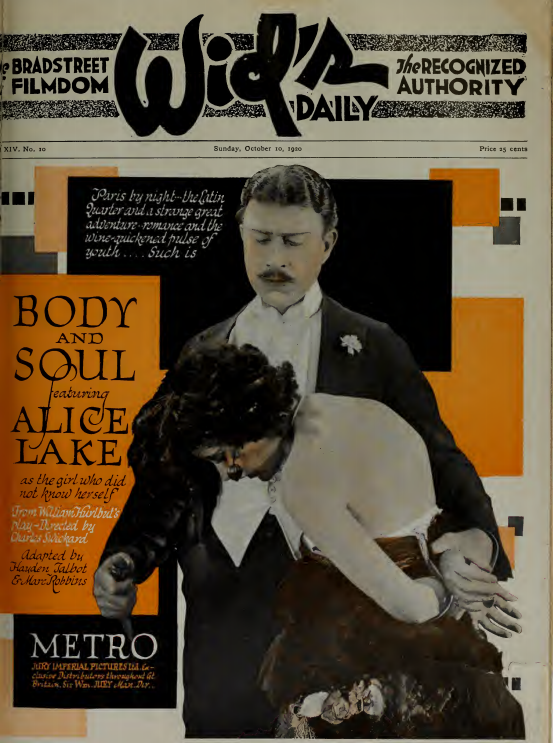
Advertisement for 1920 Metro film Body and Soul starring Alice Lake

- Body and Soul (1920)
- Lillies on the Field (1924), based on his play
- The French Lady (1924)
- Lillies of the Field (1930), based on his play
- Good Sport (1931), screenplay
- Imitation of Life (1934 film) (1934), screenplay based on 1933 novel by Fannie Hurst
- Bride of Frankenstein (1935), co-wrote screenplay
- Adam Had Four Sons (1940), co-wrote screenplay adaptation of Charles Bonner's novel Legacy
