= The Divine Lady =

1928 film

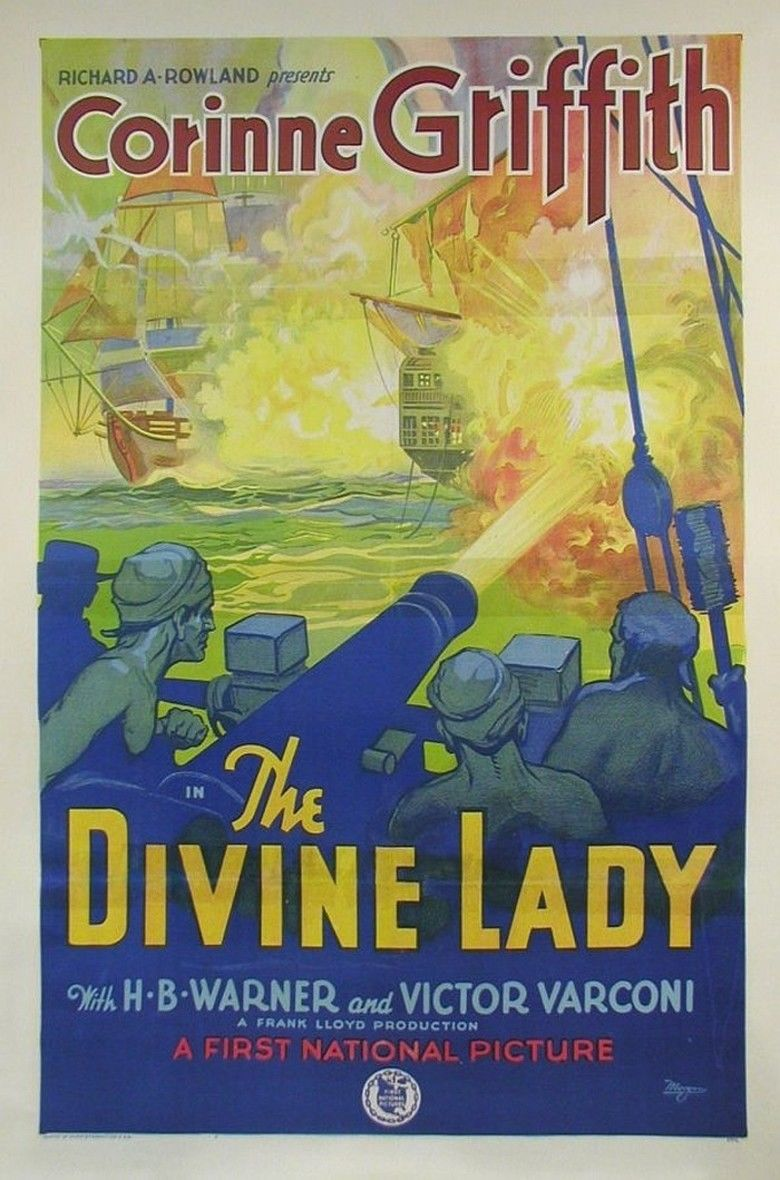
- Theatrical release poster
- Directed by: Frank Lloyd
- Written by: Forrest Halsey; Agnes Christine Johnston (continuity); Harry Carr (intertitles)
- Based on: The Divine Lady: a Romance of Nelson and Emma Hamilton; 1924 novel by E. Barrington
- Produced by: Frank Lloyd; Walter Morosco; Richard A. Rowland
- Starring: Corinne Griffith; Victor Varconi; H.B. Warner; Ian Keith
- Cinematography: John F. Seitz
- Edited by: Hugh Bennett
- Music by: Cecil Copping
- Production company: First National Pictures
- Distributed by: Warner Bros. Pictures
- Release dates: December 26, 1928 (Sweden); March 31, 1929 (United States)
- Running time: 99 minutes
- Country: United States
- Languages: Sound (Synchronized); English intertitles

The Divine Lady is a 1928 American historical drama film. While the film has no audible dialog, it was released with a synchronized musical score with sound effects using the sound-on-disc Vitaphone process. It stars Corinne Griffith and tells the story of the love affair between Horatio Nelson and Emma Hamilton. It featured the theme song "Lady Divine", with lyrics by Richard Kountz and music by Nathaniel Shilkret, which became a popular hit in 1929 and was recorded by numerous artists, such as Shilkret, Frank Munn, Ben Selvin (as the Cavaliers), Smith Ballew, Adrian Schubert, Sam Lanin, and Bob Haring.

The pre-Code film was adapted by Harry Carr, Forrest Halsey, Agnes Christine Johnston, and Edwin Justus Mayer from the novel The Divine Lady: A Romance of Nelson and Emma Hamilton by E. Barrington. It was directed by Frank Lloyd.

The film won the Academy Award for Best Director and was nominated for Best Actress in a Leading Role (Corinne Griffith) and Best Cinematography. It is the only film to be awarded Best Director without a Best Picture nomination (one year earlier, Two Arabian Knights was awarded for Best Director of a Comedy Picture without being nominated for Best Picture).

== Plot ==
The Divine Lady

In the late 18th century, Lady Hamilton has had a somewhat turbulent relationship with the British people, especially the aristocracy. Born Emma Hart from a very humble background (she being the daughter of a cook), she was seen as being vulgar by the rich, but equally captivating for her beauty. In a move to protect his inheritance, Honorable Charles Greville, Emma's then lover and her mother's employer, sent Emma to Naples under false pretenses to live with his uncle, Sir William Hamilton, where she would study to become a lady.

Surprisingly to Greville whose deception Emma would eventually discover, Emma ended up becoming Hamilton's wife in a marriage of convenience. But it is Emma's eventual relationship with Horatio Nelson of the British navy that would cause the largest issue. A move by Lady Hamilton helped Nelson's armada defeat Napoleon's fleet in naval battles, which Nelson would have ultimately lost without Lady Hamilton's help. Beyond the dangers of war, Lady Hamilton and Nelson's relationship is ultimately threatened by the court of public opinion as both are married to other people.

== Cast ==
- Corinne Griffith as Emma Hart
- Victor Varconi as Horatio Nelson
- H. B. Warner as Sir William Hamilton
- Ian Keith as Honorable Charles Greville
- Marie Dressler as Mrs. Hart
- Montagu Love as Captain Hardy
- William Conklin as Romney
- Dorothy Cumming as Queen Maria Carolina
- Michael Vavitch as King Ferdinand
- Evelyn Hall as Duchess of Devonshire
- Helen Jerome Eddy as Lady Nelson

== Music ==
The film featured a theme song entitled “Lady Divine,” by Richard Kountz (words) and Nathaniel Shilkret (music). The song is sung off screen on the soundtrack by Frank Munn both solo and as a duet with Helen Clark. Also featured on the soundtrack is a song entitled “Pearl Of Mine” by Percy Fletcher.

== Preservation ==
The film still survives intact along with its Vitaphone soundtrack. This film was a joint preservation project of the UCLA Film & Television Archive and the Museum of Modern Art Department of Film in cooperation with the Czechoslovak Film Archive. It was restored in conjunction with the project American Moviemakers: The Dawn of Sound.

== Home media ==
In 2009, the film was released on manufactured-on-demand DVD by the Warner Archive Collection.

== See also ==
- List of early sound feature films (1926–1929)
