= The Broadway Bubble =

1920 film

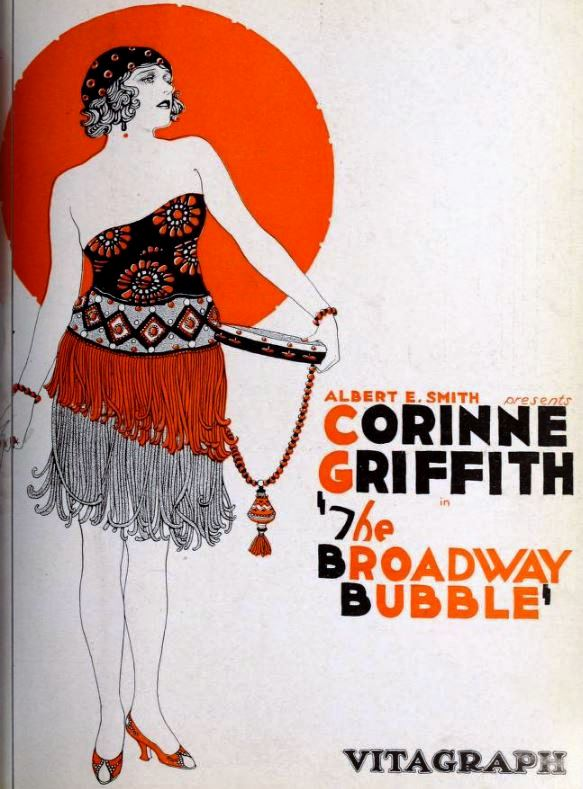
- Advertisement
- Directed by: George L. Sargent
- Written by: Graham Baker; Harry Dittmar
- Based on: short story, The Broadway Bubble, by Leigh Gordon Giltner, Young's Magazine April 1920
- Produced by: Vitagraph Company of America
- Starring: Corinne Griffith
- Cinematography: Robert Stewart; Charles J. Davis
- Distributed by: Vitagraph Company of America
- Release date: October 1920
- Running time: 5 reels
- Country: United States
- Language: Silent (English intertitles)

The Broadway Bubble is a lost 1920 American silent drama film directed by George L. Sargent and starring Corinne Griffith in a dual role as twin sisters. It was produced and distributed by the Vitagraph Company of America.

== Plot ==
As described in a film magazine, finding married life irksome, Adrienne Landreth (Griffith) asks her husband Geoffrey (King) for permission to return to the stage. When he refuses to give it, she decides to take up her career anyway and sends for her unmarried twin sister Drina (Griffith) to take her place in the household. Geoffrey spends but a few hours with Drina before he must depart for the West on a business trip, but during that time he notices a difference in his supposed wife, a difference he hopes will result in patching the troubles in their marriage.

During his absence the stage production is whipped into shape for its New York City opening. Geoffrey returns from his trip on the day of the show's opening and Drina acting as his wife, still repulsing him but acting more tender than ever. He suggests they dine out and take in a theater show. They arrive at the theater where Adrienne is performing under the name Ruth Raye, arriving late and in the middle of one of her solo numbers. Geoffrey is bewildered by the sight of his wife on stage when she is supposedly sitting next to him. He is still in a daze when Adrienne spies him and collapses down a flight of stairs to the stage and is then carried to her dressing room. The curtain is wrung down and Geoffrey and Drina rush to the dressing room where Adrienne, the "Broadway Bubble," dies. With her death, the electric lighted letters on the marque spelling out Ruth Raye go out one by one, and Geoffrey is left with Drina.

== Cast ==
- Corinne Griffith as Adrienne Landreth / Drina Lynn
- Joe King as Geoffrey Landreth
- Stanley Warmerton as Fred Corliss
- Robert Gaillard as Higginson
