= Ian Keith =

American actor

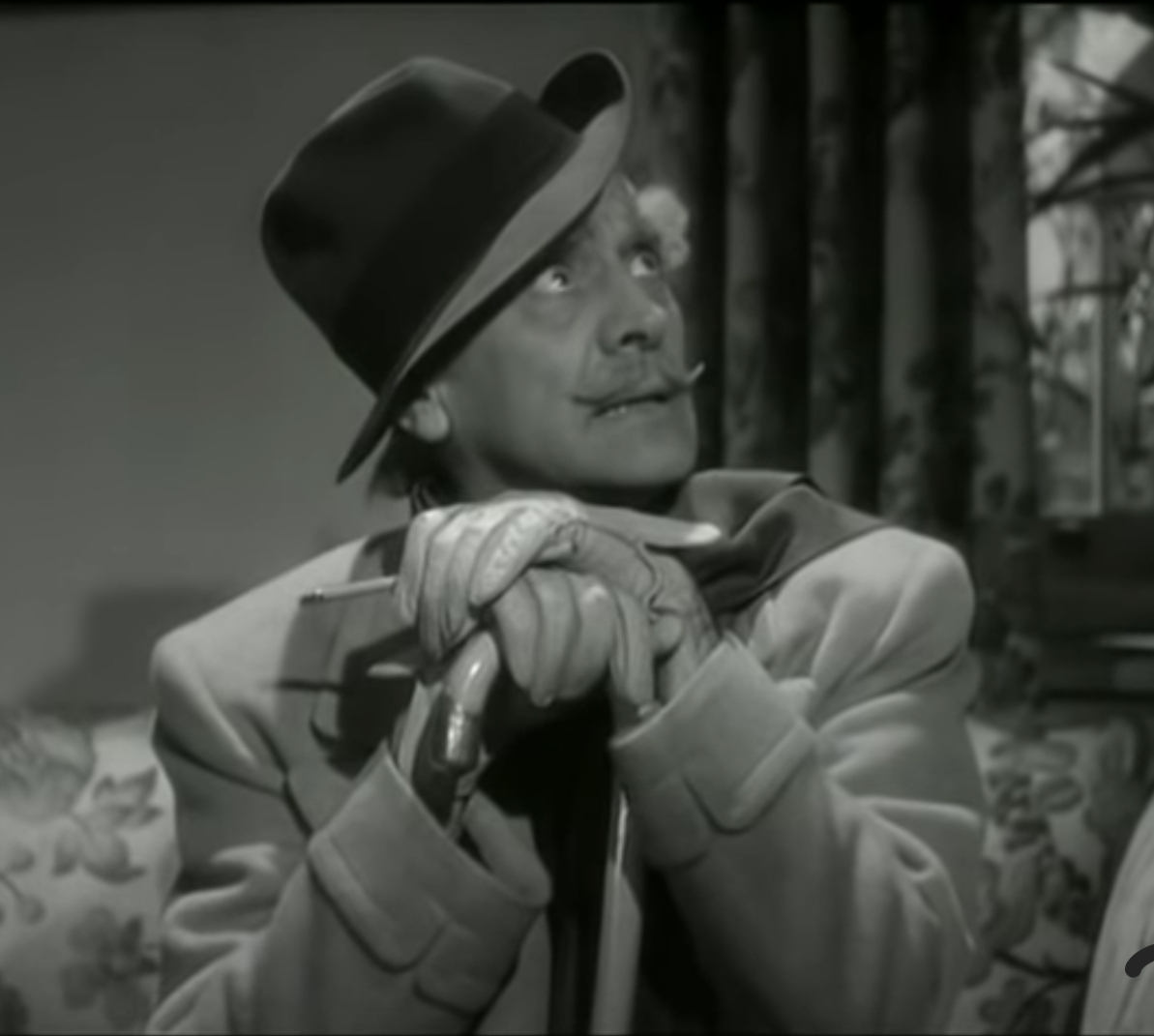
- Keith in Dick Tracy's Dilemma (1947)
- Born: Keith Macauley Ross; February 27, 1899; Boston, Massachusetts, U.S.
- Died: March 26, 1960 (aged 61); New York City, New York, U.S.
- Education: Francis W. Parker School
- Occupation: Actor
- Years active: 1924–1959
- Spouses: Blanche Yurka (m. 1922; div. 1926) Ethel Clayton (m. 1928; div. 1931) Fern Andra (m. 1932; div. 1934) Hildegarde Pabst (m. 1936)

Keith Macauley Ross (February 27, 1899 – March 26, 1960), known by the stage name Ian Keith, was an American actor. He was a veteran character actor of the stage, and appeared in a variety of colorful film roles during the silent era. During the Golden Age of Hollywood, he was best known for his collaborations with director Cecil B. DeMille, appearing in five of his films between 1932 and 1956.

== Early life ==
Born in Boston, Massachusetts to William Andrew Ross and Mahala 'May' Wilson Ross, Keith grew up in Chicago. He was educated at the Francis W. Parker School there and played Hamlet in a school production at age 16.

== Career ==
In 1919, as Keith Ross, he acted with the Copley Repertory Theatre in Boston. On Broadway, as Ian Keith, he performed in The Andersonville Trial (1959), Edwin Booth (1958), Saint Joan (1956), Touchstone (1953), The Leading Lady (1948), A Woman's a Fool - to Be Clever (1938), Robin Landing (1937), King Richard II (1937), Best Sellers (1933), Hangman's Whip (1933), Firebird (1932), Queen Bee (1929), The Command Performance (1928), The Master of the Inn (1925), Laugh, Clown, Laugh! (1923), As You Like It (1923), The Czarina (1922), and The Silver Fox (1921).

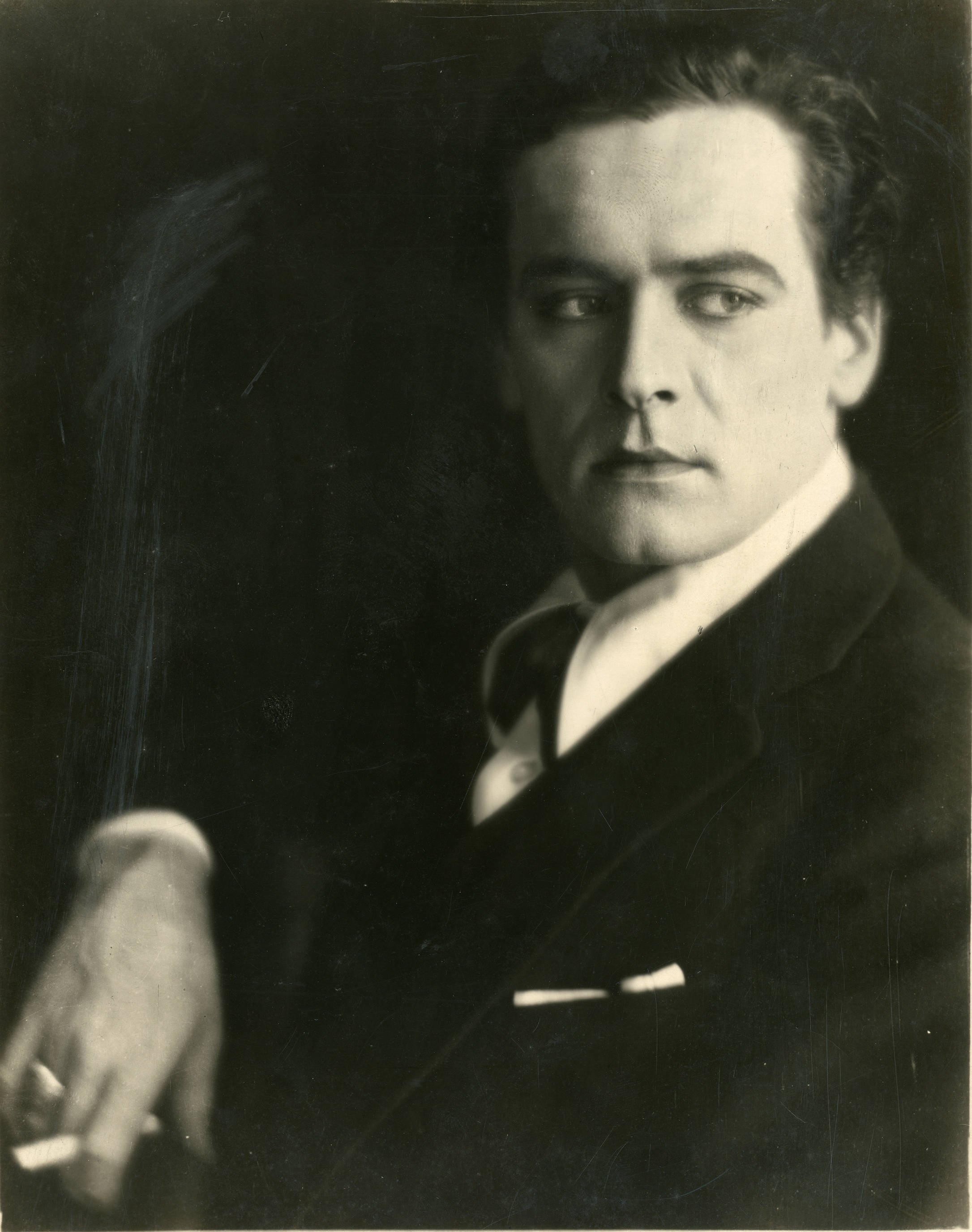
Keith in 1925

He played John Wilkes Booth in D. W. Griffith's first sound film, Abraham Lincoln. Keith had a major role as a gambler in director Raoul Walsh's 1930 widescreen western The Big Trail starring John Wayne. In 1932, Cecil B. DeMille cast him in The Sign of the Cross. This established him as a dependable supporting player, and he went on to play dozens of roles—including Octavian (Augustus) in Cleopatra—in major and minor screen fare for the next three decades.

He became one of DeMille's favorites, appearing in many of the producer's epic films. He portrayed Count de Rochefort in both the 1935 version and the 1948 remake of The Three Musketeers. In the 1940s he became even busier, working primarily in "B" features and westerns and alternating between playing good guys (a chief of detectives in The Payoff, a friendly hypnotist in Mr. Hex, a blowhard politician in She Gets Her Man) and bad guys (a murder suspect in The Chinese Cat, a crooked lawyer in Bowery Champs, a swindler in Singing on the Trail). He appeared in a supporting role to Tyrone Power in Nightmare Alley (1947) as a former vaudevillian turned carny who has succumbed to alcoholism. He also had a definite flair for comedy, and his florid portrayal of the comic-strip ham actor "Vitamin Flintheart" in Dick Tracy vs. Cueball was so amusing that he repeated the role in two more films.

He played tough-guy military roles, such as Admiral Burns in Robert Gordon's sci-fi epic, It Came From Beneath the Sea (1955).

He also appeared on many television episodes in the 1950s, including starring in the premiere episode of The Nash Airflyte Theater in 1950. In 1955, he was seen on screen in his only Shakespeare role, when he made a cameo appearance as the Ghost opposite Richard Burton's Hamlet in a sequence from the Edwin Booth biopic Prince of Players. Cecil B. DeMille brought him back to the big screen for The Ten Commandments (1956); Keith played Ramses I.

Keith played Emmett Dayton in the radio soap opera Girl Alone.

== Personal life ==
Keith was married four times:

- Blanche Yurka (1922 - 1926)
- Ethel Clayton (1928 - 1931)
- Fern Andra (m. in 1932 and again in 1934, when the legality of the first ceremony was questioned; divorced; in 1938 Andra married again)
- Hildegarde Pabst (1936 - 1960 [his death])

=== Death ===
Keith died in Medical Arts Hospital in New York on March 26, 1960, and was cremated in Hartsdale, New York.

== Partial filmography ==
- Manhandled (1924) as Robert Brandt (film debut)
- Her Love Story (1924) as Captain Kavor
- Christine of the Hungry Heart (1924) as Ivan Vianney
- Love's Wilderness (1924) as Paul L'Estrange
- Enticement (1925) as Richard Valyran
- My Son (1925) as Felipe Vargas
- The Talker (1925) as Ned Hollister
- The Tower of Lies (1925) as Lars
- The Greater Glory (1926) as Pauli Birbach
- The Lily (1926) as George Arnaud
- Prince of Tempters (1926) as Mario Ambrosio, later Baron Humberto Giordano
- The Truthful Sex (1926) as Tom Barnes
- The Love of Sunya (1927) as Louis Anthony
- What Every Girl Should Know (1927) as Arthur Graham
- Convoy (1927) as Smith
- Two Arabian Knights (1927) as Shevket
- A Man's Past (1927) as Dr. Fontaine
- The Street of Illusion (1928) as Edwin Booth Benton
- The Lookout Girl (1928) as Dean Richardson
- The Divine Lady (1929) as Honorable Charles Greville
- Prisoners (1929) as Nicholas Cathy
- Light Fingers (1929) as Light Fingers
- The Great Divide (1929) as Steven Ghent
- Prince of Diamonds (1930) as Rupert Endon
- Abraham Lincoln (1930) as John Wilkes Booth
- The Big Trail (1930) as Bill Thorpe
- The Boudoir Diplomat (1930) as Baron Belmar
- A Tailor Made Man (1931) as Dr. Von Sonntag
- The Sin Ship (1931) as Smiley Marsden
- The Phantom of Paris (1931) as Marquis Du Touchais
- Susan Lenox (1931) as Robert Lane
- The Deceiver (1931) as Reginald Thorpe
- The Sign of the Cross (1932) as Tigellinus
- Queen Christina (1933) as Magnus
- Dangerous Corner (1934) as Martin Chatfield
- Cleopatra (1934) as Octavian
- The Crusades (1935) as Saladin - Sultan of Islam
- The Three Musketeers (1935) as de Rochefort
- Don't Gamble with Love (1936) as John Crane
- The Preview Murder Mystery (1936) as E. Gordon Smith
- Mary of Scotland (1936) as James Stuart - Earl of Moray
- White Legion (1936) as Dr. Julian Murray
- The Buccaneer (1938) as Senator Crawford
- Comet Over Broadway (1938) as Wilton Banks
- The Sea Hawk (1940) as Peralta
- All This, and Heaven Too (1940) as DeLangle
- Remember Pearl Harbor (1942) as Capt. Hudson
- Fall In (1942) as Army Doctor (uncredited)
- The Payoff (1942) as Inspector Thomas
- The Sundown Kid (1942) as J. Richard Spencer
- Corregidor (1943) as Capt. Morris
- Wild Horse Stampede (1943) as Carson
- I Escaped from the Gestapo (1943) as Gerard
- Five Graves to Cairo (1943) as Capt. St. Bride (uncredited)
- That Nazty Nuisance (1943) as Chief Paj Mab
- The Man from Thunder River (1943) as Henry Stevens
- Bordertown Gun Fighters (1943) as Cameo Shelby
- Adventures of the Flying Cadets (1943, Serial) as Col. Lee [Chs. 9-13]
- Here Comes Kelly (1943) as L. Herbert Oakley - Attorney
- Casanova in Burlesque (1944) as J. Boggs-Robinson
- Arizona Whirlwind (1944) as Polini
- The Chinese Cat (1944) as Dr. Paul Recknik
- Cowboy from Lonesome River (1944) as Matt Conway
- Bowery Champs (1944) as Ken Duncan
- Under Western Skies (1945) as Prof. Moffat
- Fog Island (1945) as Dr. Lake
- Identity Unknown (1945) as Major Williams
- Phantom of the Plains (1945) as Talbot Wilberforce Champneys aka Fancy Charlie
- Song of Old Wyoming (1945) as Lee Landow
- The Spanish Main (1945) as Captain Lussan
- Northwest Trail (1945) as Inspector McGrath
- Valley of the Zombies (1946) as Ormand Murks
- Singing on the Trail (1946) as Jerry Easton
- The Strange Woman (1946) as Lincoln Pittridge (uncredited)
- Mr. Hex (1946) as Mr. Raymond, the Hypnotist
- Dick Tracy vs. Cueball (1946) as Vitamin Flintheart
- Border Feud (1947) as Doc Peters
- Dick Tracy's Dilemma (1947) as Vitamin Flintheart
- Nightmare Alley (1947) as Pete Krumbein
- Forever Amber (1947) as Tybalt (uncredited)
- The Three Musketeers (1948) as Rochefort
- The Black Shield of Falworth (1954) as King Henry IV
- Prince of Players (1955) as Ghost of Hamlet's Father in 'Hamlet'
- New York Confidential (1955) as Waluska
- It Came from Beneath the Sea (1955) as Adm. Burns
- The Adventures of Rin Tin Tin (1955, TV) as Roland Tarleton
- Duel on the Mississippi (1955) as Jacques Scarlet
- The Ten Commandments (1956) as Rameses I (final film)
