= Single Wives =

1924 film by George Archainbaud

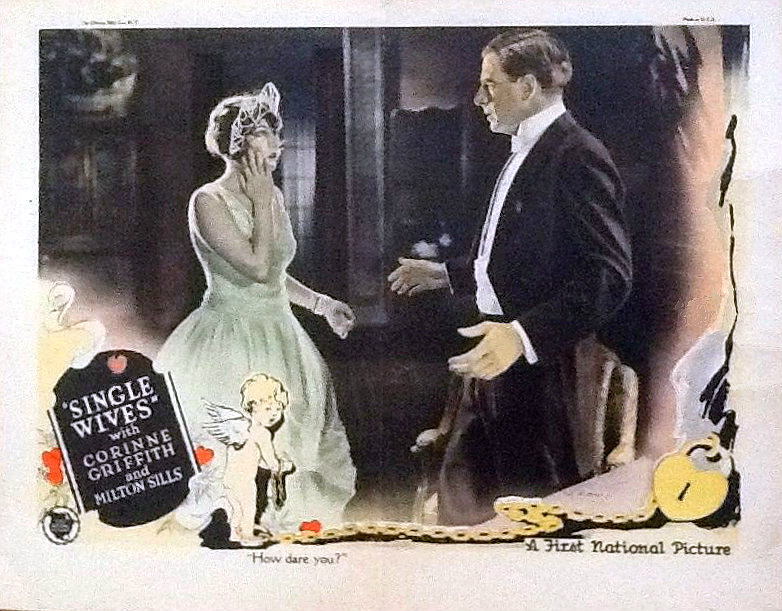
- Lobby card
- Directed by: George Archainbaud
- Written by: Marion Orth (scenario)
- Story by: Earl Hudson
- Produced by: Corinne Griffith
- Starring: Corinne Griffith; Milton Sills; Lou Tellegen; Kathlyn Williams
- Cinematography: Ned Connors; James Van Trees
- Edited by: Arthur Tavares
- Distributed by: Associated First National Pictures
- Release date: July 24, 1924 (United States)
- Running time: 80 minutes
- Country: United States
- Language: Silent (English intertitles)

Single Wives is a 1924 American silent drama film directed by George Archainbaud and produced by and starring Corinne Griffith. It was distributed by First National Pictures.

== Cast ==
- Corinne Griffith as Betty Jordan
- Milton Sills as Perry Jordan
- Kathlyn Williams as Dorothy Van Clark
- Phyllis Haver as Marion Eldridge
- Phillips Smalley as Tom Van Clark
- Jere Austin as Dr. Walter Lane
- Lou Tellegen as Martin Prayle
- Henry B. Walthall as Franklin Dexter
- John Patrick as Billy Eldridge
- J.C. Fowler in an Undetermined Role (uncredited)

== Preservation status ==
Single Wives is preserved at the George Eastman Museum Motion Picture Collection.
