= Anne Schaefer =

American actress

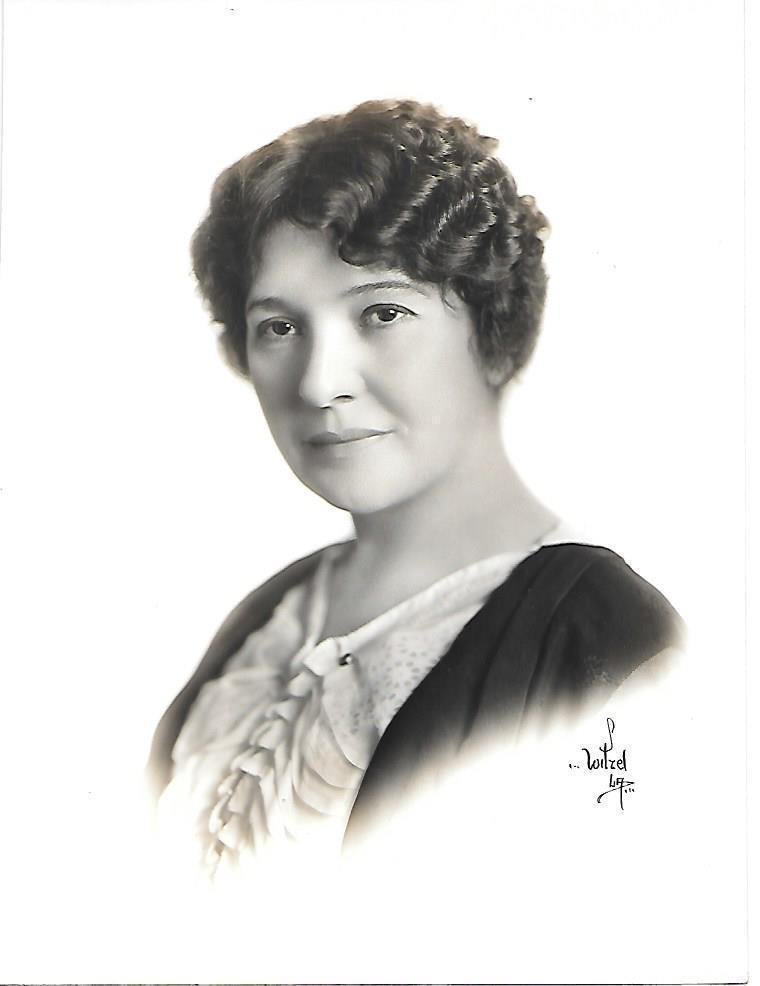
- Who's Who in the Film World (1914)
- Born: July 10, 1870; St. Louis, Missouri, U.S.
- Died: May 3, 1957 (aged 86); Los Angeles, California, U.S.
- Occupation: Actress
- Years active: 1911–1938
- Spouse: F. Medek
- Relatives: Eva Novak (niece); Jane Novak (niece)

Anne Schaefer (July 10, 1870 – May 3, 1957) was an American actress. She appeared in 147 films between 1911 and 1938. She was the aunt (by marriage) of fellow actresses Eva and Jane Novak.

Schaefer was born to German parents, Mr. and Mrs. Herman Schafer, on July 10, 1870, in St. Louis, Missouri, and attended Notre Dame Convent school in St. Louis. She also studied at a dramatic school founded by Lawrence Hanley in St. Louis and acted in his summer stock company. After acting on stage for several years, she signed with the Vitagraph film company.

== Partial filmography ==
- The Voiceless Message (1911)
- Cinders (1913)
- Johanna Enlists (1916)
- The Price of a Good Time (1917)
- The Little Princess (1917)
- Periwinkle (1917)
- Melissa of the Hills (1917)
- Social Briars (1918)
- The Demon (1918)
- Cupid Forecloses (1919)
- Six Feet Four (1919)
- Over the Garden Wall (1919)
- A Fighting Colleen (1919)
- The Chorus Girl's Romance (1920)
- Pegeen (1920)
- Mrs. Temple's Telegram (1920)
- The City of Masks (1920)
- Nobody's Kid (1921)
- The Wolverine (1921)
- A Dangerous Game (1922)
- Main Street (1923)
- Heritage of the Desert (1924)
- West of the Water Tower (1924)
- Love's Wilderness (1924)
- The Tower of Lies (1925)
- The Devil Dancer (1927)
- The Night Flyer (1928)
- Wheel of Chance (1928)
- Prisoners (1929)
- Lilies of the Field (1930)
