= Infatuation (1925 film) =

1925 film

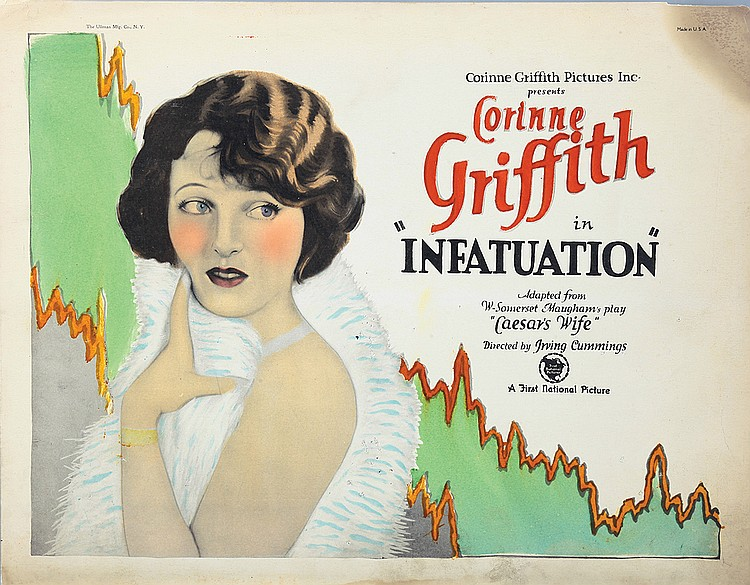
- Lobby card
- Directed by: Irving Cummings
- Based on: Caesar's Wife by W. Somerset Maugham
- Produced by: Corinne Griffith
- Starring: Corinne Griffith; Percy Marmont; Warner Oland
- Cinematography: Harold Rosson
- Production company: First National Pictures
- Distributed by: First National Pictures
- Release date: December 27, 1925
- Running time: 70 minutes
- Country: United States
- Language: Silent (English intertitles)

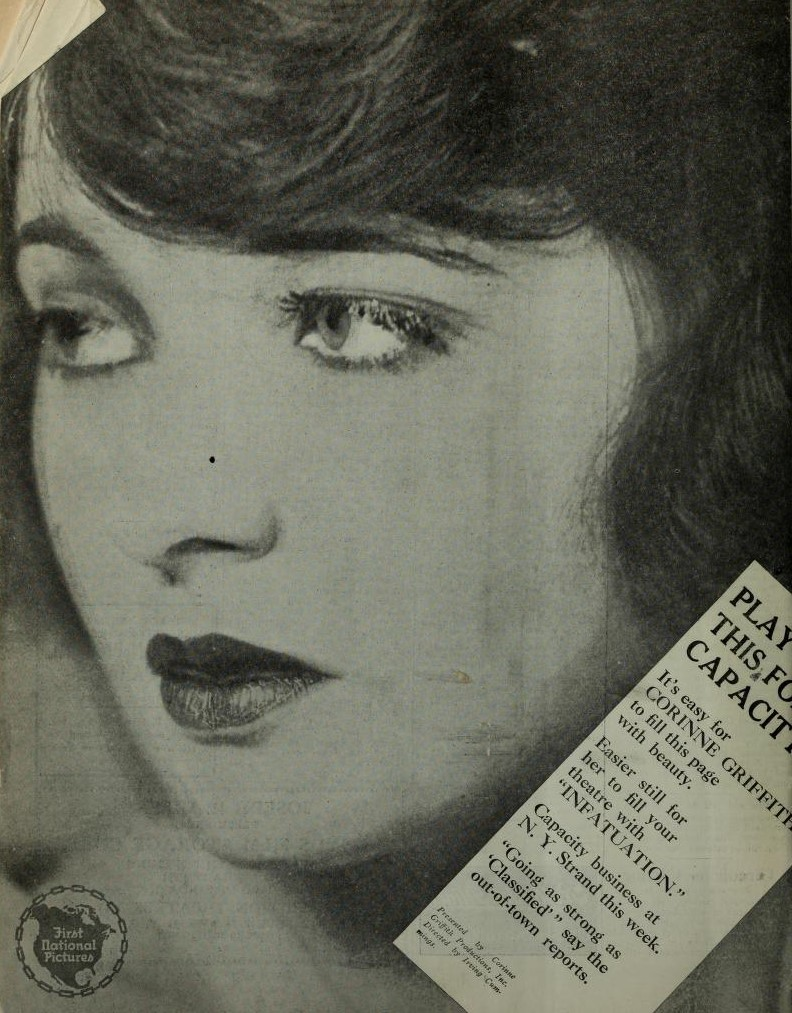
Corinne Griffith in Infatuation ad in 1925 The Film Daily

Infatuation is a 1925 American silent drama film directed by Irving Cummings and starring Corinne Griffith, Percy Marmont, and Warner Oland. It is an adaptation of the 1919 play Caesar's Wife by Somerset Maugham.

== Plot ==
As described in a film magazine review, neglected by her husband Sir Arthur Little during his assignment in Cairo, Violet seeks the company of Ronald Perry, Sir Arthur's secretary. Parry's sister, sensing the romance, arranges to have Parry transferred from Egypt to Paris. However, Parry remains in Cairo, and indications are that Sir Arthur has lost the love of his wife forever. Violet then hears of a plan to assassinate Sir Arthur, and suddenly realizes that she loves her husband. She takes actions that save his life, and a reconciliation between the married couple follows.

== Cast ==
- Corinne Griffith as Violet Bancroft
- Percy Marmont as Sir Arthur Little
- Malcolm McGregor as Ronald Perry
- Warner Oland as Osman Pasha
- Clarissa Selwynne as Lady Ethridge
- Leota Lorraine as Ronny's Sister
- Claire Du Brey as Pasha's Wife
- Martha Mattox as Mrs. Pritchard
- Howard Davies as Khedive

== Bibliography ==
- Goble, Alan. The Complete Index to Literary Sources in Film. Walter de Gruyter, 1999. ISBN 1-85739-229-9
