= The Girl Problem =

1919 drama film

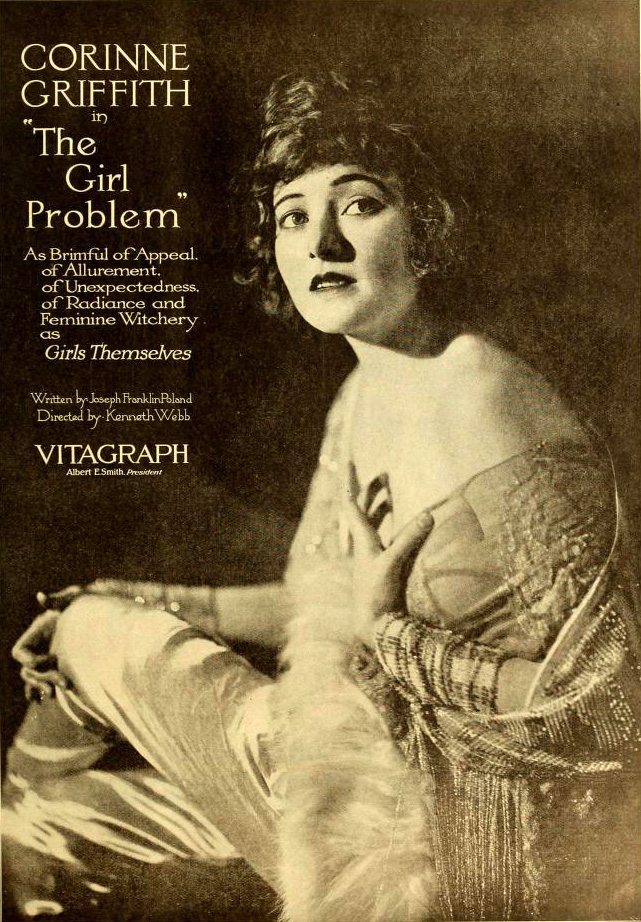
- Directed by: Kenneth S. Webb
- Screenplay by: Graham Baker
- Story by: Joseph Franklin Poland
- Starring: Corinne Griffith; Agnes Ayres; Walter McGrail
- Cinematography: Tom Malloy
- Production company: Vitagraph Studios
- Release date: March 3, 1919
- Running time: 50 minutes
- Country: United States

The Girl Problem is a 1919 American drama film directed by Kenneth S. Webb, and starring Corinne Griffith. It is considered a lost film.

== Cast ==
- Corinne Griffith as Erminie Foster
- Agnes Ayres as Helen Reeves
- Walter McGrail as Ernest Sanford
- William David as Monte Ralston
- Julia Swayne Gordon as Mrs. Reeves
- Eulalie Jensen as Aunt Julia
- Frank Kingsley as Eric Jordan
- Harold Foshay as Hasbrook
