= Lilies of the Field (1924 film) =

1924 film by John Francis Dillon

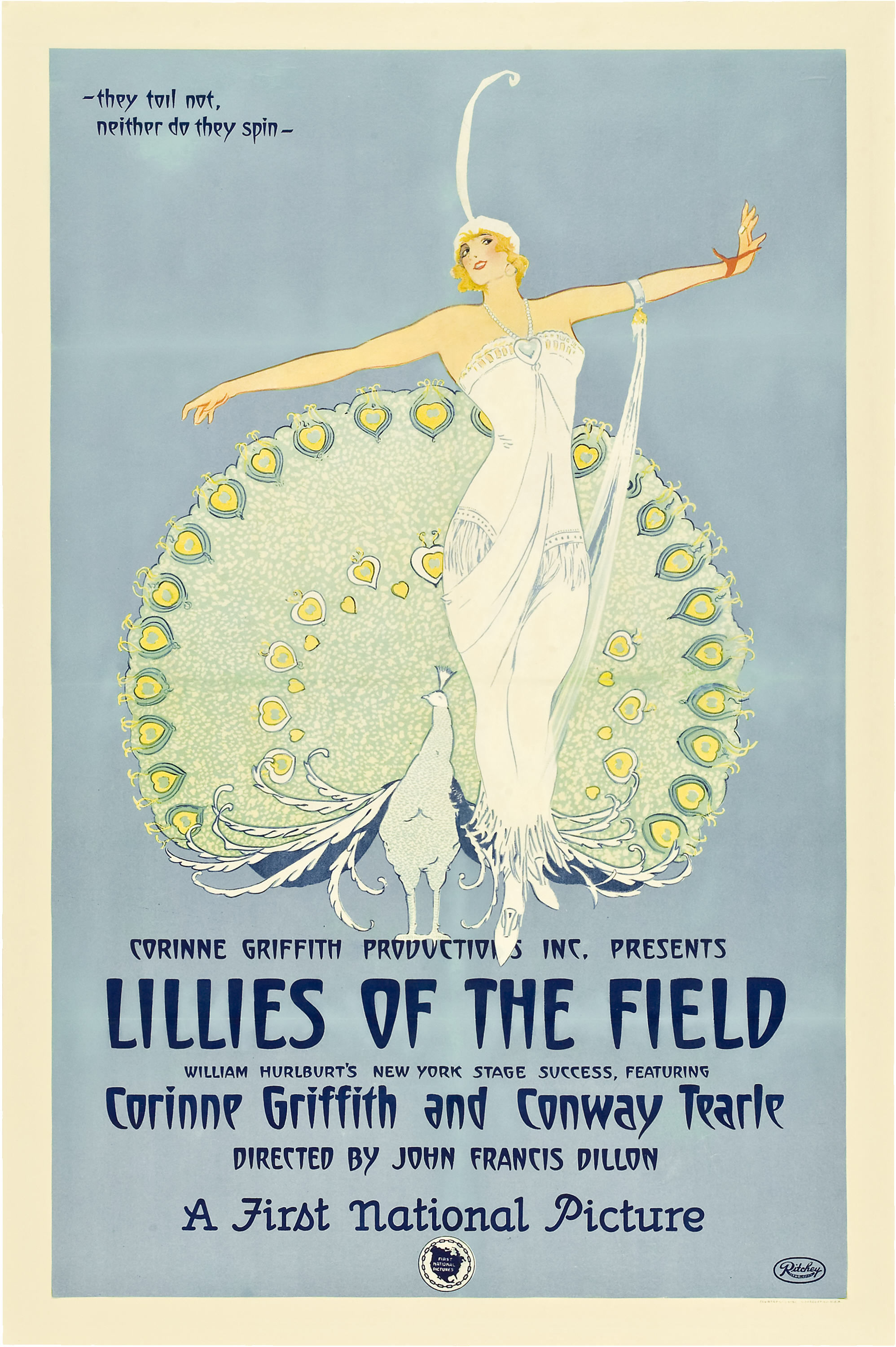
- Film poster
- Directed by: John Francis Dillon
- Written by: Marion Fairfax (writer); Adelaide Heilbron (writer)
- Based on: Lilies of the Field; 1921 play by William J. Hurlbut
- Produced by: Corinne Griffith
- Starring: Corinne Griffith
- Cinematography: James Van Trees
- Edited by: Arthur Tavares
- Distributed by: Associated First National
- Release date: February 29, 1924
- Running time: 90 minutes; 9 reels
- Country: United States
- Language: Silent (English intertitles)

Lilies of the Field is a 1924 American silent drama film directed by John Francis Dillon, produced by and starring actress Corinne Griffith, and distributed by Associated First National Pictures. It is based on a 1921 play, Lilies of the Field, by William J. Hurlbut. The film was remade by Griffith as an early sound film in 1930.

The phrase "Lilies of the Field" occurs in the Bible, in Matthew 6:28.

== Plot ==
As described in a film magazine review, neglected by her pleasure-loving husband, Mildred Harker attends a ball and becomes compromised by an admirer. Walter Harker divorces her and obtains custody of their baby. Mildred, employed as a model, refuses the offer of Louis Willing to occupy an apartment at his expense and to become his mistress. Willing, who really is in love with her, becomes convinced of Mildred's worthiness. They marry and she regains custody of her child.

== Cast ==
- Corinne Griffith as Mildred Harker
- Conway Tearle as Louis Willing
- Alma Bennett as Doris
- Sylvia Breamer as Vera
- Myrtle Stedman as Mazie
- Crauford Kent as Walter Harker
- Charles Murray as Charles Lee
- Phyllis Haver as Gertrude
- Cissy Fitzgerald as Florette
- Edith Ransom as Amy
- Charles K. Gerrard as Ted Conroy (credited as Charles Gerrard)
- Dorothy Brock as Rose
- Mattie Peters as Mammy (credited as Mammy Peters)
- Anna May Wong (uncredited role)

== Preservation ==
With no copies of Lilies of the Field located in any film archives, it is a lost film. A trailer to this film exists at the Library of Congress.
