= Lily Christine =

1932 film

- Theatrical film poster
- Directed by: Paul L. Stein
- Written by: Michael Arlen (novel); Robert Gore Brown
- Produced by: Walter Morosco
- Starring: Corinne Griffith; Colin Clive; Margaret Bannerman
- Cinematography: Rudolph Maté
- Production company: Paramount British Pictures
- Distributed by: Paramount British Pictures
- Release date: April 1932
- Running time: 82 minutes
- Country: United Kingdom
- Language: English

Lily Christine is a 1932 British drama film directed by Paul L. Stein and starring Corinne Griffith, Colin Clive and Margaret Bannerman.

It was made at British and Dominion Elstree Studios by Paramount Pictures.

== Cast ==
- Corinne Griffith as Lily Christine Summerset
- Colin Clive as Rupert Harvey
- Margaret Bannerman as Mrs. Abbey
- Miles Mander as Ambatriadi
- Jack Trevor as Ivor Summerset
- Anne Grey as Muriel Harvey
- Barbara Everest as Hempel
- Freddie Bartholomew as Child
- Peter Graves

== Bibliography ==
- Low, Rachael. Filmmaking in 1930s Britain. George Allen & Unwin, 1985.
