= Lilies of the Field (1930 film) =

Lost 1930 musical film by Alexander Korda

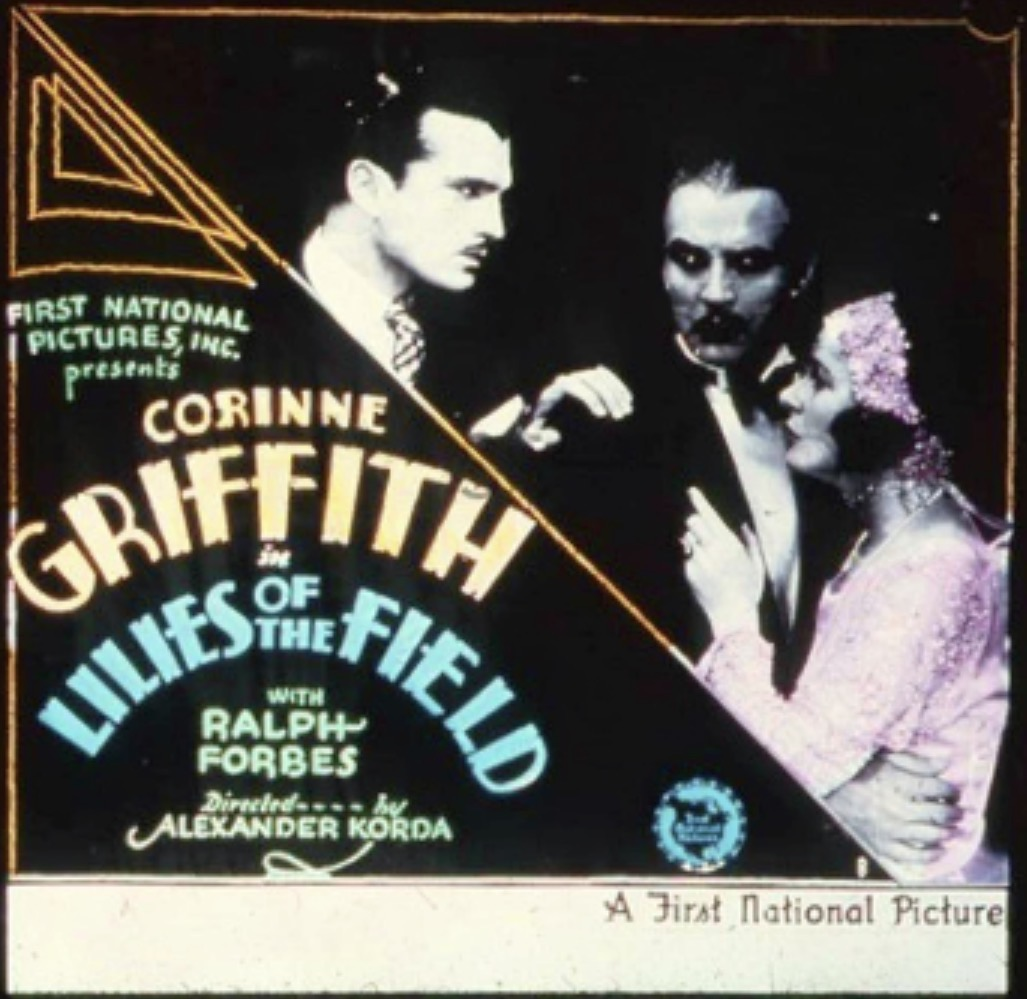
- Lantern Slide
- Directed by: Alexander Korda
- Written by: John F. Goodrich
- Based on: Lilies of the Field; 1921 play by William J. Hurlbut
- Produced by: Walter Morosco
- Starring: Corinne Griffith; Ralph Forbes; John Loder; Eve Southern
- Cinematography: Lee Garmes
- Production company: First National Pictures
- Distributed by: Warner Bros. Pictures
- Release dates: January 5, 1930 (limited release); March 18, 1930 (LDN); October 6, 1930 (UK)
- Running time: 60 minutes
- Country: United States
- Language: English

Lilies of the Field is a 1930 American pre-Code musical drama film directed by Alexander Korda, and starring Corinne Griffith, Ralph Forbes, and John Loder. It was a remake of the silent 1924 film Lilies of the Field, in which Griffith had played the same role. Both films were based on a 1921 play of the same name by William J. Hurlbut. Lilies of the Field was Griffith's first all-dialogue film. The film is not related in any way to the 1963 film of the same name.

== Plot ==
Mildred Harker, a socialite woman married to the rich Walter Harker, finds out her husband has fallen in love with another woman and wants to separate from his wife without losing custody of his daughter. He frames his wife to seem unfit for custody and files for divorce, and Mildred ends up losing her daughter.

Mildred moves into a cheap apartment and becomes a Broadway showgirl, drowning her depression in a life of alcohol and jazz. She performs in a nightclub as Speed in the "Mechanical Ballet" sequence. She befriends many of the showgirls. Ted Willing, one of her husband’s wealthy friends, becomes her devoted admirer, but after her experience with her ex-husband, Mildred finds it hard to trust anyone. When Willing offers Mildred financial help, she refuses to accept anything, fearing that her daughter may hear about it.

One day, Mildred breaks into her ex-husband’s apartment to try and see her daughter, but when she doesn’t recognize her, she is devastated. Walter comes home and finds she has broken into his apartment, and she runs away.

Soon after, while she is at a party, Mildred hears of Walter’s death in a car crash and realizes she now has custody of her daughter. She goes to the police station, but is jailed for drinking and disorderly conduct. Willing comes to pay her large bail and Mildred agrees to marry him. She gets custody of her daughter.

== Cast ==
- Corinne Griffith – Mildred Harker
- Ralph Forbes – Ted Willing
- John Loder – Walter Harker
- Eve Southern – Pink
- Jean Laverty – Gertie
- Tyler Brooke – Bert Miller
- Freeman Wood – Lewis Conroy
- George Beranger – Barber
- Douglas Gerrard – Headwaiter
- Rita La Roy – Florette
- Betty Boyd – Joyce
- May Boley – Maizie
- Virginia Bruce – Doris
- Charles Hill Mailes – Judge
- Raymond Largay – Harker's lawyer
- Joseph E. Bernard – Mildred's lawyer
- Tenen Holtz – Paymaster
- Wilfred Noy – Butler
- Anne Schaefer – First maid
- Clarissa Selwynne – Second maid

== Songs ==
The theme song for the movie, titled "I'd Like to Be a Gypsy", was written for the film by Ned Washington and Michael H. Cleary. Cleary also wrote "Speed", the song used in the Mechanical Ballet sequence for the film.

== Preservation status ==
No copies of this film are known to exist, and it is believed that the film is now lost. Fragments of the "Mechanical Ballet" sequence are preserved in the 1932 Joe E. Brown comedy film The Tenderfoot.

== See also ==
- List of lost films
- List of Warner Bros. films (1930-1939)

== Bibliography ==
- Kulik, Karol. Alexander Korda: The Man Who Could Work Miracles. Virgin Books, 1990.
