= Walter Morosco =

American film producer

- Born: February 1, 1899; San Francisco, California, U.S.
- Died: December 30, 1948 (aged 49)
- Occupations: Actor; film director; film producer; writer
- Spouse(s): Corinne Griffith (m. 1924; div. 1934) Shirley Newman Listenwalter; Marie M. O'Keefe
- Children: 1
- Father: Oliver Morosco

Walter Morosco (February 1, 1899 – December 30, 1948) was an American film producer, writer, actor and director.

== Biography ==
Morosco was born on February 1, 1899, in San Francisco, California. He was the son of theater impresario Oliver Morosco, and grandson of Walter M. Morosco (1846–1901), proprietor of the Morosco's Grand Opera House in San Francisco. He worked for United Artists and Fox Film Corporation before signing a contract with Twentieth Century-Fox.

Morosco was married and divorced three times: From 1924 to 1934 he was married to the actress Corinne Griffith. His other wives were Shirley Newman Listenwalter, with whom he had a son, Tim, and Marie M. O'Keefe,

Morosco died at the age of 49 after suffering a stroke.

== Partial filmography ==
- For Those We Love (1921)
- Silken Shackles (1926) (*director)
- The Divine Lady (1929)
- Mammy (1930)
- Lilies of the Field (1930)
- A Man of Mayfair (1931)
- Aren't We All? (1932)
- Women Who Play (1932-producer)
- Lily Christine (1932)
- Charlie Chan at the Wax Museum (1940)
- Moon Over Her Shoulder (1941)
- A Gentleman at Heart (1942)
- Sunday Dinner for a Soldier (1944)
- Sentimental Journey (1946)
- Scudda Hoo! Scudda Hay! (1948)
- Mother Is a Freshman (1949)
