= Corinne Griffith =

American actress and producer (1894–1979)

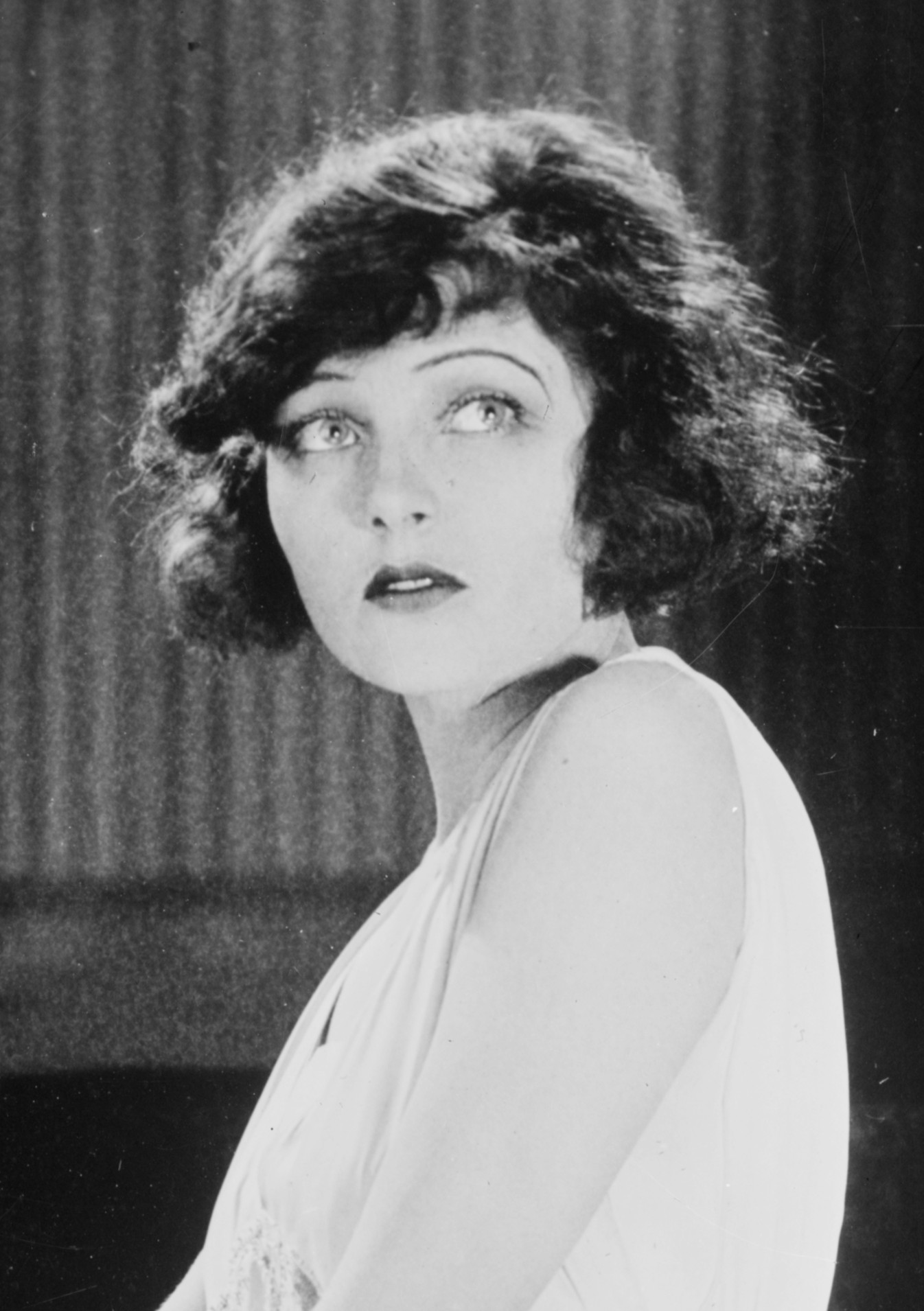
- Born: Corinne Griffin; November 21, 1894; Waco, Texas, U.S.
- Died: July 13, 1979 (aged 84); Santa Monica, California, U.S.
- Education: University of Texas at Austin
- Occupations: Actress; producer; author; businesswoman
- Years active: 1916–1932
- Spouses: Webster Campbell (m. 1920; div. 1923) Walter Morosco (m. 1924; div. 1934) George Preston Marshall (m. 1936; div. 1958) Danny Scholl (m. 1965; div. 1965)
- Children: 2

Corinne Griffith (née Griffin; November 21, 1894 – July 13, 1979) was an American film actress, producer, author and businesswoman. Dubbed "The Orchid Lady of the Screen", she was widely regarded as one of the most beautiful actresses of the silent film era. In addition to her beauty, Griffith achieved critical recognition for her performance in Frank Lloyd's The Divine Lady (1929), which earned her a nomination for the Academy Award for Best Actress.

Originally from Texas, Griffith pursued a film career after winning a beauty contest in Southern California. In 1916, she signed a contract with Vitagraph Studios, appearing in numerous films for the studio through the remainder of the decade. In 1920, she began making films for First National Pictures and became one of the studio's bigger stars. In the mid-1920s, she began executive-producing features and served as a producer on 1925's Déclassée and Classified, in both of which she starred.

In the latter part of the 1920s, Griffith's film career slowed, though she had lead performances in Outcast (1928) and the drama The Garden of Eden (also 1928). The following year, she was nominated for the Academy Award for Best Actress for her performance in The Divine Lady. She starred in Lilies of the Field, a remake of the 1924 film in which she had also starred. Her following film, Back Pay (1930), was promoted as Griffith's final screen appearance before her retirement. She did, however, appear as the lead in Lily Christine (1932) two years later.

After 1932, Griffith retired from acting and became a successful author and businesswoman, writing numerous fiction and non-fiction books, as well as venturing into real estate, in which she had begun investing in the 1920s. She married her third husband, Washington Redskins owner George Preston Marshall, in 1936, and remained married to him until 1958. She made her final film appearance with a minor role in Paradise Alley (1962), which marked her first screen appearance in 28 years. A biographical film about Griffith was released in 1963 titled Papa's Delicate Condition, based on her 1952 memoir and focusing on the relationship between her and her father. After suffering a stroke in July 1979, Griffith was hospitalized in Santa Monica, California, where she died shortly after of a heart attack. She left behind a reported estate of $150 million, making her one of the wealthiest women in the world at that time.

== Biography ==
=== 1894–1932: Early life and Vitagraph films ===
Griffith was born Corinne Griffin on November 21, 1894 (Note: Some sources state Griffith was born November 24, though biographer Anthony Slide as well as the National Museum of American History among others cite November 21 as her birthdate. Sources regarding her birth year erroneously vary from 1896 to 1906, though the California Death Index corroborates November 21, 1894 as her birthday. Additionally, U.S. census records from 1900 indicate that a then six-year-old Corinne Griffin resided in a Waco boardinghouse with her father, J. L. Griffin, mother, A. Griffin, and sister, "Gussie" (Augusta).) in Waco, Texas, (Note: Several sources claim Texarkana as Griffith's birthplace, but her obituary in The New York Times states that she was born in Waco. This is supported by an article from The Washington Post that states Griffith herself asserted that she had been born in Waco, not Texarkana, though she was raised in the latter.) one of two daughters born to John Lewis "Jack" Griffin, a Methodist minister and train conductor of the Texas & Pacific railway, and Amboline Ghio. Griffith's maternal grandfather, Antonio Ghio, was an Italian immigrant who became a successful businessman in Texas and was a three-time mayor of Texarkana; her maternal grandmother, Maria Anthes, also an immigrant, was a native of Darmstadt, Germany. At the time of Griffith's birth, her mother Amboline was in her early 20s, while her father, John, was nearly 40. Griffith's parents had married in 1887, and the wedding was a celebrated event among local high society.

Griffith and her sister were raised Catholic. Her early years were spent in Waco before the family moved to Texarkana, Texas, where Griffith lived until age 10; she moved to New Orleans, Louisiana, to attend the Sacred Heart Convent school. Her father died in Mineral Wells, Texas on March 20, 1912. After completing her primary education, Griffin enrolled at the University of Texas at Austin for the 1912–1913 semester year. She also worked as a dancer before she began her acting career.

Accounts of Griffith's entry into the film industry vary. At some point after her father's death, Griffith left Texas and relocated with her mother and sister, Augusta, to Southern California. Some sources claim she was urged by Vitagraph Studios director Rollin S. Sturgeon to pursue an acting career after winning a beauty contest in Santa Monica, California, in which Sturgeon was a judge. According to another account, Griffith met Sturgeon at a high-society event in Crescent City, California, and he offered her a film contract on the spot. In a 1919 newspaper article, Griffith said she was approached by Sturgeon in New Orleans after she won a pageant during the Mardi Gras festival. According to Griffith, Sturgeon suggested she become an actress, and several months later she traveled to California to meet with executives at Vitagraph.

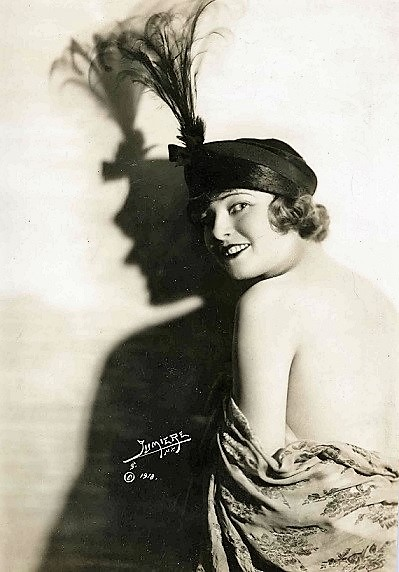
Griffith in 1918

In 1916, she signed a $15-weekly contract with Vitagraph and took the stage name Corinne Griffith. She made her screen debut in a short film titled La Paloma, opposite Earle Williams. She appeared in a series of short films for the studio before becoming a leading lady. On April 22, 1920, Griffith married her first husband, Webster Campbell, in a private ceremony in Oceanside, California.

Griffith's performance in one of her later films for Vitagraph, The Broadway Bubble (1920), was described by a critic of the Austin American-Statesman as the "strongest and most fascinating role in her notable career" and lauded it as her "crowning achievement."

=== 1923–1932: First National contract ===
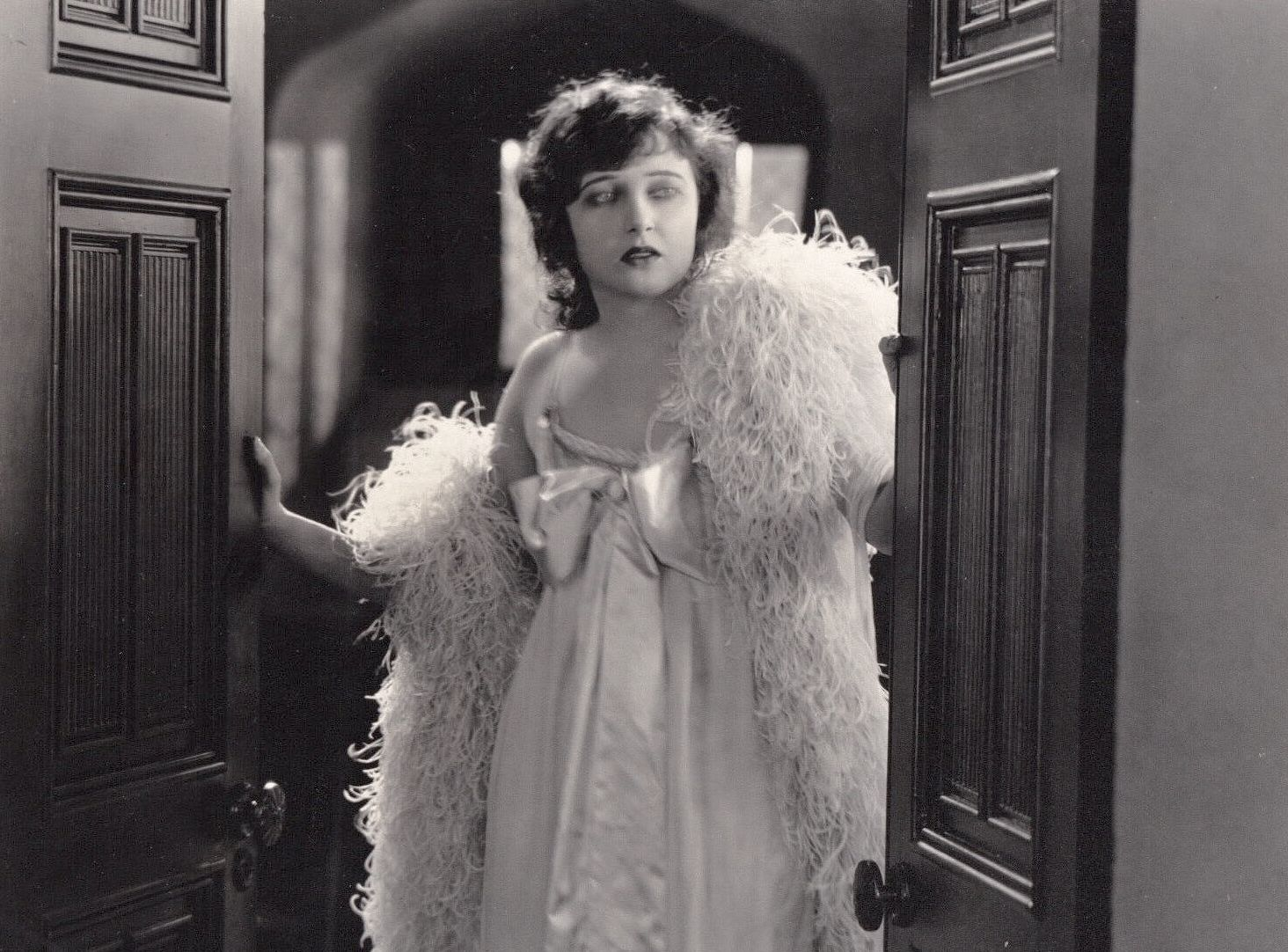
Griffith in Six Days (1923)

In 1923, after three years of marriage, Griffith divorced Campbell, whom she claimed was an abusive alcoholic. The same year, Griffith left Vitagraph Studios, signing a more lucrative contract of $10,000 a week with First National, where she became one of their most popular stars. Her first film for the studio was Frank Lloyd's Black Oxen (1923), a drama in which she portrayed a mysterious Austrian countess. The film, in which Griffith co-starred with Conway Tearle and Clara Bow, became a hit.

Griffith married producer Walter Morosco in February, 1924. The same year, she starred in and executive-produced three pictures: Single Wives, Love's Wilderness, and Lilies of the Field. All three of the films were box-office hits. By 1927, Griffith had begun investing her film income in real estate and owned approximately $500,000 worth of properties.

In 1928, she had the starring role in The Garden of Eden for United Artists which, though critically praised, was not a box-office hit. Disappointed by the film's lackluster dividends, Griffith returned to First National to appear in Frank Lloyd's The Divine Lady (1929), a sound film featuring synchronized music, but no audible dialogue. Griffith earned critical accolades for her performance, including a nomination for the Academy Award for Best Actress.

Griffith's first full sound film was Lilies of the Field, a remake of her 1924 silent film in the same role. Griffith's voice, which was regarded as nasal, did not record well (The New York Times stated that she "talked through her nose"), and the film was a box office flop. The following year, she starred in the drama Back Pay (1930), based on a story by Fannie Hurst, which was promoted as her final screen appearance. After a two-year hiatus, Griffith starred in the British film Lily Christine (1932) and then left the public eye completely.

=== 1933–1964: Post-film career ===
After her retirement from film, Griffith divorced Morosco in 1934. Two years later, she married businessman and Washington Redskins owner George Preston Marshall. In December 1941, the couple adopted two daughters, Pamela and Cynthia. In the early years of her marriage to Marshall, she wrote the lyrics to the original fight song, "Hail to the Redskins".

In the 1940s, Griffith began investing in real estate in the Los Angeles area. She funded the construction of four commercial buildings on all four corners of the intersection of Wilshire Boulevard and South Beverly Drive in Beverly Hills, California. The construction of the buildings, each named after her, proved lucrative, and she turned down an offer of $2.5 million for them in 1950. The same year, she spoke at the inaugural National Association of Real Estate Boards convention in Florida. "I liked the vacant business lots I saw in Beverly Hills with the For Sale signs on them," she recalled. "They were so near the beautiful homes there in that section and I couldn't help but feel that someday the business section would grow up to the great buying power of these wealthy estates."

"I got my money without the help of any man. Women wise enough to earn their own money will get a broader understanding of life, a new respect from their husbands and a bank account which they can use without resorting to the old tricks that sicken every wife at heart."

In addition to her real estate ventures, beginning in the 1950s, Griffith became a vocal supporter of repealing the 16th Amendment, which authorized income tax. Over the ensuing decade, she gave approximately 500 speeches on the subject. Commenting on her dedication to the topic, she stated: "We have no substitute of other taxes because we have no substitute for waste, graft and corruption. If the federal government will eliminate only part of its waste, just 40 billions of dollars a year of its waste... I can prove to you in dollars and cents that the government does not need the income tax." Griffith also spoke in support of women seeking their own financial autonomy.

Griffith was also an accomplished writer who published eleven books, including two best-sellers, My Life with the Redskins (1947), and the memoir Papa's Delicate Condition (1952), which chronicled her upbringing and family life in Texarkana. Her third publication, 1955's Eggs I Have Known, was a recipe book with gossipy anecdotes interspersed. In 1958, Griffith divorced Marshall (who she referred to in print as "The Marshall without a plan"). In 1960, she was honored for her contributions to the motion picture industry with a star on the Hollywood Walk of Fame at 1560 Vine Street. She later published her fourth book, Antiques I Have Known, a non-fiction book about her interest in antiques. Griffith returned to the screen in 1962 in the low-budget melodrama Paradise Alley, which received scant release and marked her final film role. Also in 1962, she published two books: Hollywood Stories, a selection of short fiction, and Taxation Without Representation—or, Your Money Went That-a-Way, which argued against the income tax. The following year, her memoir Papa's Delicate Condition was made into a biographical feature film of the same name starring Jackie Gleason.

=== 1965–1979: Claims about identity and final years ===
In February 1965, she married her fourth husband, Broadway actor Danny Scholl in Alexandria, Virginia. Scholl was 44 years old, more than 25 years younger than Griffith. The couple separated after two months of marriage. Within the year, Griffith filed for a divorce after a judge denied her motion for an annulment; she contended that the marriage had not been consummated. Pending trial, she was ordered to pay Scholl alimony of $200 per month beginning in December 1964.

During the divorce court proceedings in May 1966, Griffith testified that she was actually not Corinne Griffith. She instead claimed that she was Corinne's younger sister, who, although twenty years younger, had taken Corinne's place when she died in 1924. She also denied having married her former two husbands, Webster Campbell and Walter Morosco. In court, Scholl's attorney proposed that Griffith had falsified her age in the couple's marriage documents as well as failed to disclose her previous two marriages. Upon being questioned about her age, Griffith refused to comment, stating that her religion, Christian Science, prevented her from publicly disclosing it. She also claimed not to have kept record of her age since she was 13 years old. Actresses Betty Blythe and Claire Windsor, who had both known Griffith since the 1920s, contradicted her testimony, but did not shake her story, and she continued to claim that she was in fact Corinne's sister.

In a subsequent interview, Griffith further complicated her story, claiming to be Corinne's twin named Mary, rather than her younger sister:

I am Mary Griffith. Her twin sister. Let me explain. She, Corinne, was starring in a film in Mexico in 1920. She was stricken by a mysterious local malady and died suddenly at age twenty-four. Mr. Adolph Zukor, head of Paramount, called me in person and told me I must save the day; a cancellation of the picture would be a disaster for the studio. He told me what had happened; I cried and cried. He said I must pull myself together: there was a million dollars in it if I would become my sister. I had never acted and didn't want to act. But I couldn't resist the money, and I felt Corinne would want me to help. So I went to Mexico and took over, and nobody knew the difference. From then on, I was Corinne Griffith.

In the same interview, she stated that Corinne had been buried in an unmarked grave in Mexico.

Following the publicity surrounding her divorce and identity claims, Griffith spent the remainder of her years writing. In 1969, she published Not for Men Only – but Almost, a non-fiction book detailing the appeal of sports to men and its lack of appeal for most women. She published another collection of personal non-fiction stories titled This You Won't Believe in 1972. Her final book I'm Lucky at Cards (1974) was a book of her essays.

== Screen and public image ==
Griffith was lauded by numerous publications for her beauty. Valeria Beletti, a secretary of Samuel Goldwyn, described Griffith as "the most beautiful of all the silent stars, talented or otherwise," despite the fact that she personally found Griffith abrasive: "very haughty and disdainful. She looks at no one but her dogs, and is generally disliked by all." According to biographer Anthony Slide, the common phrase "the camera loves her" was coined for Griffith.

In addition to her appearance, Griffith took efforts to maintain a decorous and healthful image, claiming never to have smoked or drunk alcohol. She also avoided swearing and refrained from wearing make-up when not appearing on film. Columnist Adela Rogers St. Johns once referred to Griffith as "innocence personified."

== Death ==
Griffith suffered a stroke in early July 1979, brought on by cerebral arteriosclerosis, and was hospitalized at Saint John's Hospital in Santa Monica, California. She died there shortly after of a heart attack on July 13, aged 84. Her sister Augusta, from whom she had been estranged, had died only weeks earlier. Griffith's remains were cremated by the Chapel of the Pines Crematory in Los Angeles and buried at sea in the Pacific Ocean. At the time of her death, Griffith's estate was valued at $150 million, principally real estate.

== Filmography ==
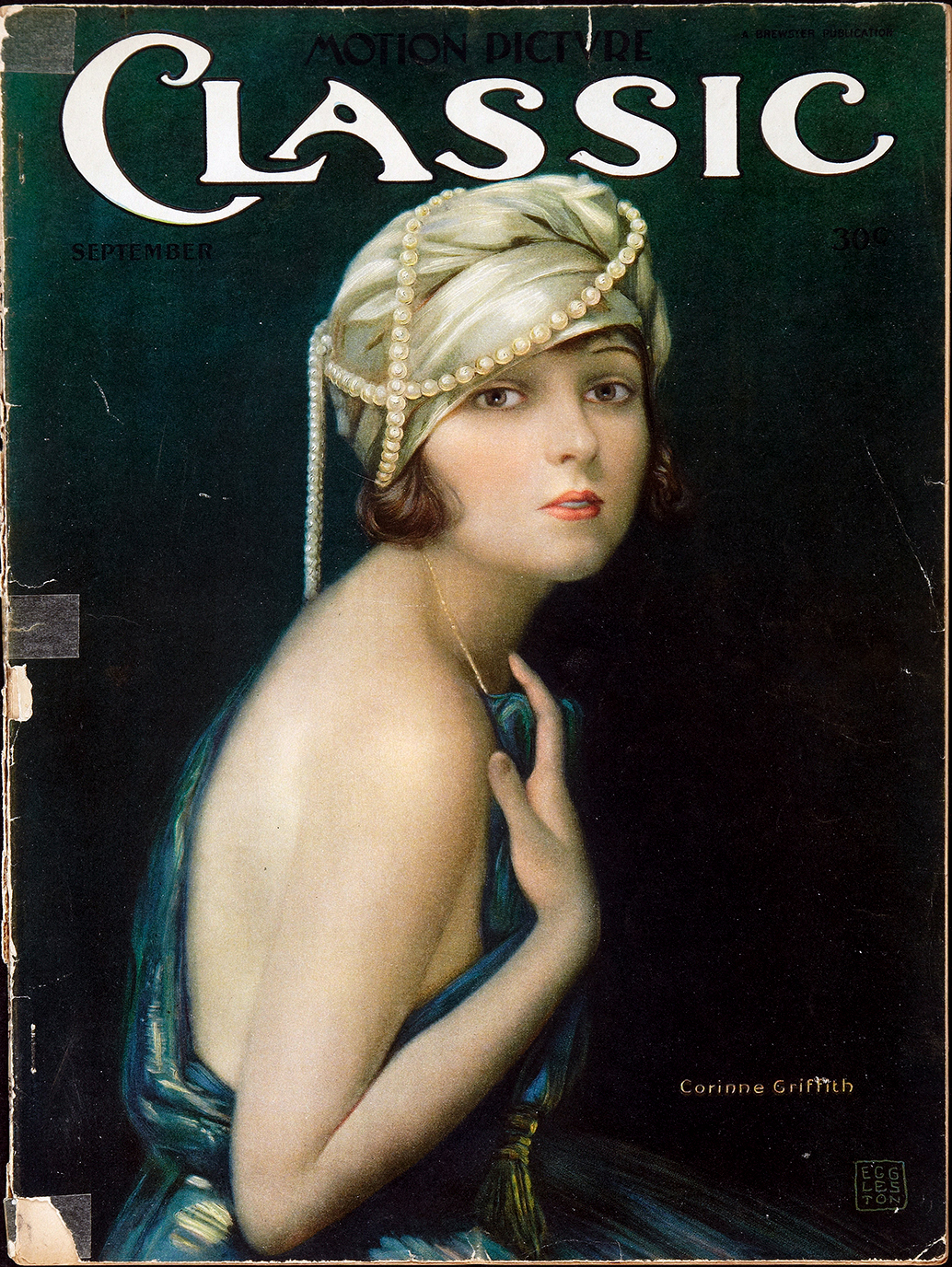
Motion Picture Classic magazine, September 1921, cover art by Benjamin Eggleston (1867–1937).

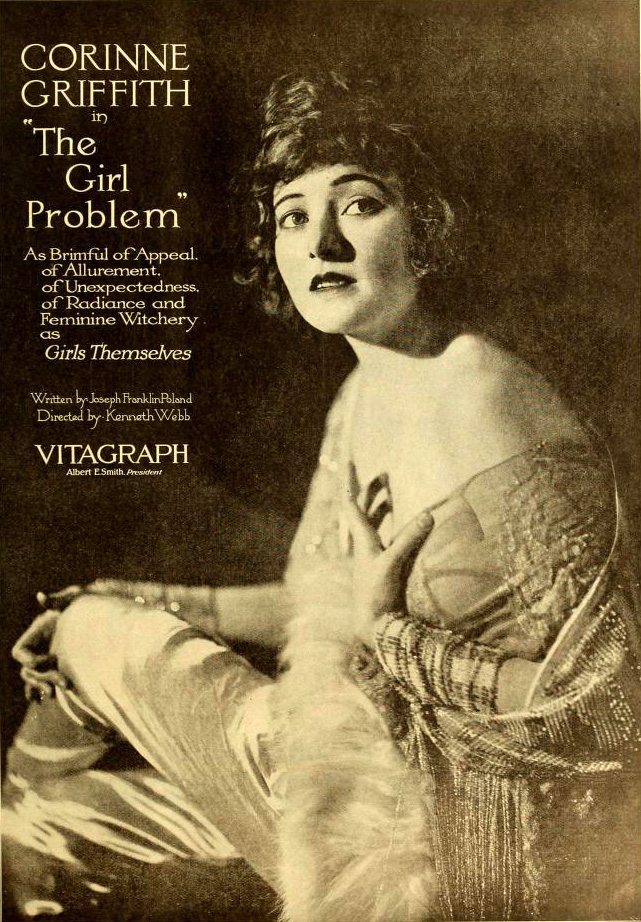
The Girl Problem (1919)

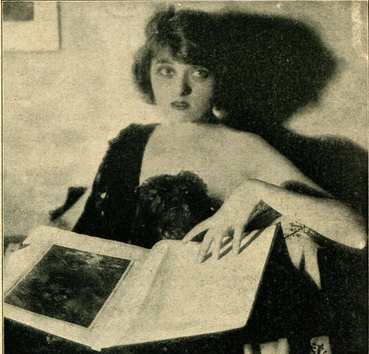
The Common Law (1923)

Key
†	Denotes a lost or presumed lost film.

Year	Title	Role	Notes	Ref.
1916	La Paloma †	Stella	Short film	
1916	Bitter Sweet †	Ruth Slatter – John's Wife	Short film	
1916	When Hubby Forgot †	The Maid	Short film	
1916	Sin's Penalty †	Lola Wilson	Short film	
1916	Miss Adventure †	Gloria	Short film	
1916	The Cost of High Living	Jack's Sister	Short film	
1916	The Rich Idler †	Marion- Mary's Friend	Short film	
1916	Ashes †	The Nurse	Short film	
1916	The Waters of Lethe †	Joyce Denton	Short film	
1916	The Yellow Girl	Corinne	Short film	
1916	A Fool and His Friend †		Short film	
1916	Through the Wall †	Pussy Wimott		
1916	The Last Man †	Lorna		
1916	His Wife's Allowance †		Short film	
1917	The Mystery of Lake Lethe †		Short film	
1917	The Stolen Treaty †	Irene Mitchell		
1917	Transgression †	Marion Hayward		
1917	The Love Doctor †	Blanche Hildreth		
1917	I Will Repay †	Virginia Rodney		
1917	Who Goes There? †	Karen Girard		
1918	The Menace †	Virginia Denton		
1918	Love Watches †	Jacqueline Cartaret		
1918	The Clutch of Circumstance †	Ruth Lawson		
1918	The Girl of Today †	Leslie Selden		
1918	Miss Ambition †	Marta		
1919	The Adventure Shop †	Phyllis Blake		
1919	The Girl Problem †	Erminie Foster		
1919	The Unknown Quantity †	Mary Boyne		
1919	Thin Ice	Alice Winton		
1919	A Girl at Bay †	Mary Allen		
1919	The Bramble Bush †	Kaly Dial		
1919	The Climbers	Blanche Sterling		
1920	The Tower of Jewels †	Emily Cottrell		
1920	Human Collateral †	Patricia Langdon		
1920	Deadline at Eleven †	Helen Stevens		
1920	The Garter Girl †	Rosalie Ray		
1920	Babs †	Barbara Marvin; "Babs"		
1920	The Whisper Market †	Erminie North		
1920	The Broadway Bubble †	Adrienne Landreth/Drina Lynn		
1921	It Isn't Being Done This Season †	Marcia Ventnor		
1921	What's Your Reputation Worth? †	Cara Deene		
1921	Moral Fibre †	Marion Wolcott		
1921	The Single Track †	Janette Gildersleeve		
1922	Received Payment †	Celia Hughes		
1922	A Virgin's Sacrifice †	Althea Sherrill		
1922	Island Wives †	Elsa Melton		
1922	Divorce Coupons †	Linda Catherton		
1922	The Common Law †	Valerie West		
1923	Black Oxen	Madame Zatianny/Mary Ogden		
1923	Six Days	Laline Kingston		
1924	Single Wives	Betty Jordan	Executive producer	
1924	Love's Wilderness	Linda Lou Heath	Executive producer	
1924	Lilies of the Field †	Mildred Harker	Executive producer	
1925	Déclassée	Lady Helen Haden	Producer	
1925	Classified	Babs Comet	Producer	
1925	Infatuation †	Violet Bancroft	Executive producer	
1925	The Marriage Whirl †	Marian Hale	Executive producer	
1926	Mademoiselle Modiste †	Fifi	Executive producer	
1926	Into Her Kingdom †	Grand Duchess Tatiana (at 12 and 20)	Executive producer	
1926	Syncopating Sue †	Susan Adams	Executive producer	
1927	The Lady in Ermine †	Mariana Beltrami	Executive producer	
1927	Three Hours	Madeline Durkin	Executive producer	
1928	The Garden of Eden	Toni LeBrun		
1928	Outcast	Miriam		
1929	Saturday's Children †	Bobby Halevy		
1929	Prisoners †	Riza Riga		
1929	The Divine Lady	Lady Emma Hart Hamilton	Nominated— Academy Award for Best Actress	
1930	Lilies of the Field †	Mildred Harker		
1930	Back Pay	Hester Bevins		
1932	Lily Christine	Lily Christine Summerset		
1962	Paradise Alley	Mrs. Wilson	Alternative title: Stars in the Backyard	

== Bibliography ==
- My Life with the Redskins (1947) – history of the Washington Redskins football team, owned by her husband, George Marshall
- Papa's Delicate Condition (1952) – memoir of her childhood
- Eggs I Have Known (1955) – collection of recipes
- Antiques I Have Known (1961) – book about her interest in antiques
- Taxation Without Representation—or, Your Money Went That-a-Way (1962) – Griffith's argument against taxes
- I Can't Boil Water (1963) – collection of recipes she obtained from famous restaurants
- Hollywood Stories (1963) – collection of short fiction written by Griffith
- Truth Is Stranger (1964) – collection of true stories and anecdotes told by Griffith that struck her as stranger than any fiction
- Not for Men Only – but Almost (1969) – a book on sports and its lack of appeal for most women
- This You Won't Believe (1972) – another collection similar to Truth Is Stranger
- I'm Lucky at Cards (1974) – a book of various essays by Griffith

== Sources ==
- Addis, Patricia K. (1983). Through a Woman's I: An Annotated Bibliography of American Women's Autobiographical Writings, 1946–1976. Lanham, Maryland: Scarecrow Press. ISBN 978-0-810-81588-9.
- Barrios, Richard (1995). A Song in the Dark: The Birth of the Musical Film. New York City, New York: Oxford University Press US. ISBN 0-19-508811-5.
- Bodeen, DeWitt (1975). "Corinne Griffith: The Orchid of the Silver Screen". Films in Review. 26. National Board of Review of Motion Pictures: 514–528. ISSN 0015-1688.
- Haile, Bartee (2019). Texas Entertainers: Lone Stars in Profile. Chicago, Illinois: Arcadia, Publishing. ISBN 978-1-439-66648-7.
- Higham, Charles (2004). Murder in Hollywood: Solving a Silent Screen Mystery. Madison, Wisconsin: Terrace Books. ISBN 978-0-299-20364-1.
- Liebman, Roy (1996). Silent Film Performers: An Annotated Bibliography of Published, Unpublished and Archival Sources for Over 350 Actors and Actresses. Jefferson, North Carolina: McFarland. ISBN 978-0-786-40100-0.
- Lowe, Denise (2004). An Encyclopedic Dictionary of Women in Early American Films, 1895–1930: 1895–1930. New York City, New York: Routledge. ISBN 0-7890-1843-8.
- Porter, Darwin (2005). Howard Hughes: Hell's Angel. New York City, New York: Blood Moon Productions, Ltd. ISBN 0-9748118-1-5.
- Pylant, James (2014). Texas Gothic: Fame, Crime and Crazy Water. Stephenville, Texas: Jacobus Books. ISBN 978-0-984-18577-1.
- Richman, Michael (2007). The Redskins Encyclopedia. Philadelphia, Pennsylvania: Temple University Press. ISBN 978-1-59213-542-4.
- Sanchez, Nellie van De Grift (1930). California and Californians. Vol. 4. Chicago, Illinois: Lewis Publishing Company. OCLC 123306377.
- Slide, Anthony (2010). Silent Players: A Biographical and Autobiographical Study of 100 Silent Film Actors and Actresses. Lexington, Kentucky: University Press of Kentucky. ISBN 978-0-813-13745-2.
- Wilson, Scott (2016). Resting Places: The Burial Sites of More Than 14,000 Famous Persons (3rd ed.). Jefferson, North Carolina: McFarland. ISBN 978-0-786-47992-4.
- Woodward, Kathleen, ed. (1999). Figuring Age: Women, Bodies, Generations. Bloomington, Indiana: Indiana University Press. ISBN 978-0-253-11384-9.
