= The Phantom Flyer =

1928 film

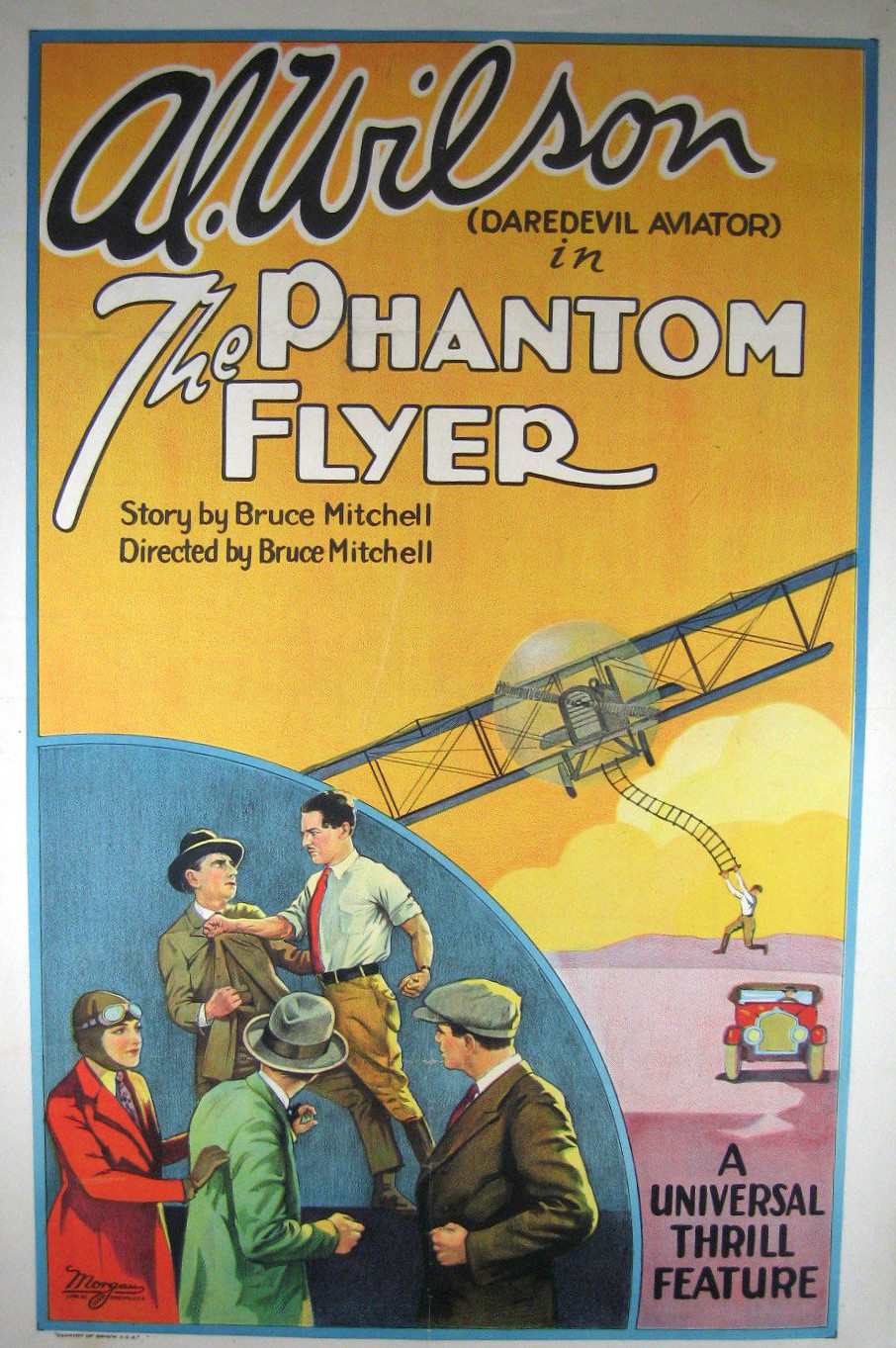
- Film poster
- Directed by: Bruce M. Mitchell
- Written by: Bruce M. Mitchell (story, scenario); Gardner Bradford (titles)
- Produced by: Carl Laemmle
- Starring: Al Wilson; Lillian Gilmore; Buck Connors
- Cinematography: William S. Adams
- Production company: Universal Pictures
- Distributed by: Universal Pictures
- Release date: Template:Dilm date
- Running time: 5 reels
- Country: United States
- Languages: Silent; English intertitles

The Phantom Flyer (aka The Phantom Ranger) is a 1928 American silent Western and aviation film directed by Bruce M. Mitchell and starring Al Wilson, Lillian Gilmore and Buck Connors. The film was produced and distributed by the Universal Pictures. The Phantom Flyer was one of a series of films that showcased the exploits of the stunt pilots in Hollywood. A print of The Phantom Flyer exists and is available on DVD.

The Phantom Flyer is not to be confused with another 1928 film of the same title, a 2-reeler starring Jack Hoxie.

== Plot ==
Farmer James Crandall is homesteading on a western tract with the aid of his daughter, Mary, his son, Nick, and Isabella, an orphan girl. Rancher Julia Hart, is in a struggle with the Crandalls over the water rights of her ranch.

Mary catches Julia's men running brands on their cattle and after running away from them, is rescued by Dick Stanton, a border patrol aviator, who agrees to help her. One of Hart's gang, Joe Calvert shoots Nick in an attempted raid and sabotages her aircraft, loosening a wheel that will fall off in mid-air.

Dick flies to Mary's aid, taking with him a replacement wheel that he attaches while hanging from the landing gear in the air. Together they bring a doctor for Nick.

When Crandall discovers that his "first entry" papers have been stolen, Dick goes to the Hart ranch to investigate. Crandall is forced to sign a quit-claim deed, but Dick arrives just as Calvert abducts Mary in an aircraft. "Slim" Decker flies with Dick and a battle takes place in the sky. Calvert falls to his death while Julia ultimately relinquishes her claim to the Crandall deed, and, finally there is peace.

== Cast ==
- Al Wilson as Dick Stanton
- Lillian Gilmore as Mary Crandall
- Buck Connors as James Crandall
- Billy "Red" Jones as Nick Crandall
- Don Fuller as "Slim" Decker
- Myrtis Crinley as Isabella Pipp, The Cook
- Mary Cornwallis as Julia Hart
- Larry Steers as Joe Calvert

== Production ==
Al Wilson was not only the star of The Phantom Flyer but also flew as a "stunt pilot" in the film. After Wilson became a flying instructor and a short period as manager of the Mercury Aviation Company, founded by one of his students, Cecil B. DeMille, Wilson became more and more skilled in performing stunts, including wing-walking, and left the company to become a professional stunt pilot, specializing in Hollywood aviation films.

Production started on The Phantom Flyer in 1928 at the newly established Wilson Aero Service at Glendale Airport, California. Wilson had joined with his brother, Roy, another pilot, to create a fixed-base operation that not only worked on Hollywood films but also offered charter and passenger flights.

Wilson worked together with stuntmen like Frank Clarke and Wally Timm and also worked independently for film companies, including Universal Pictures. After numerous appearances in stunt roles, he started his career as an actor in 1923 with the serial The Eagle's Talons. Wilson produced his own movies until 1927, when he went back to work with Universal. (Note: Wilson was one of the pilots flying in Hell's Angels (1930) and during filming, he was involved in an accident where the mechanic Phil Jones died. This episode marked the end of his career as stunt pilot in Hollywood.)

== Reception ==
Aviation film historian Stephen Pendo, in Aviation in the Cinema (1985) said The Phantom Flyer was only one of a long list of aviation films that showcased Wilson's talents. He alternately wrote, acted and flew in a career that "spanned more than 10 years, and he acted in more films than any other professional pilot." Pendo noted that Wilson repeated the aerial stunts that highlighted the action in The Phantom Flyer in other films, including Won in the Clouds (1928) and The Cloud Dodger (1928).
