= Sky High Saunders =

1927 film

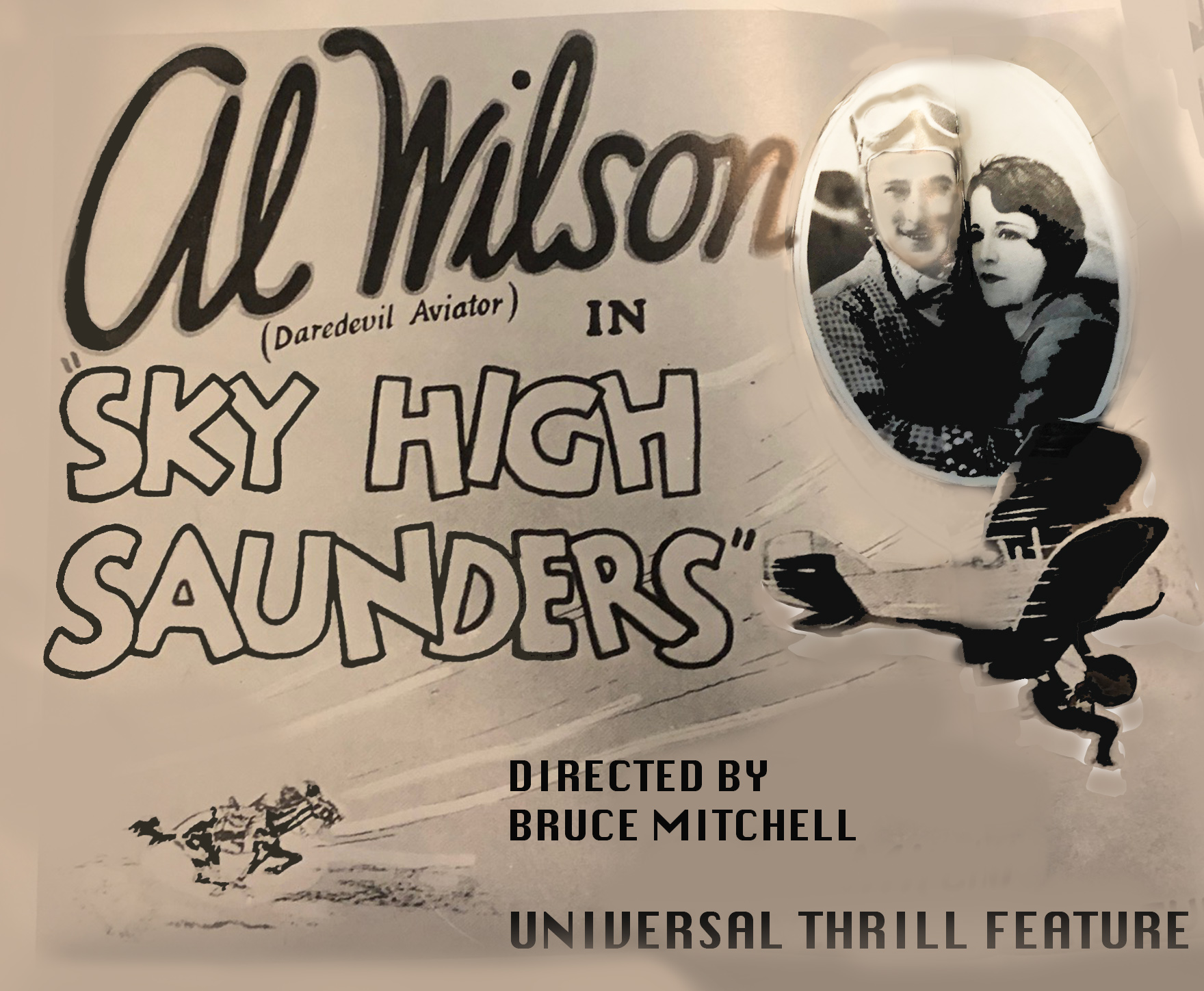
- Lobby card
- Directed by: Bruce Mitchell (credited as Bruce M. Mitchell)
- Written by: Bruce Mitchell (story) (credited as Bruce M. Mitchell) (scenario); Gardner Bradford (titles)
- Produced by: Carl Laemmle
- Starring: Al Wilson; Elsie Tarron; Frank Rice
- Cinematography: William S. Adams (credited as William Adams)
- Production company: Universal Pictures (as Universal Thrill Feature)
- Distributed by: Universal Pictures
- Release date: November 6, 1927
- Running time: 5 reels
- Country: United States
- Languages: Silent film; English intertitles

Sky High Saunders (aka Skyhigh Saunders and Sky-High Saunders)is a 1927 American silent action film directed by Bruce M. Mitchell. The film stars Al Wilson (playing both "Sky-High" Saunders and his twin brother, Michael Saunders), Elsie Tarron and Frank Rice. Sky High Saunders was one of a series of films that showcased the exploits of the stunt pilots in Hollywood.

== Plot ==
While searching for his twin brother, Michael Saunders, whom his family believes was killed in combat, "Sky-High" Saunders discovers a gang of aircraft smugglers. The leader, George Delatour, is in love with schoolteacher Helen Leland, whom Sky-High saves from the smuggler's unwelcome attentions, knocking him unconscious in a fight.

Mistaking Sky-High for Michael, Delatour seeks to get even but is convinced that he has been "seeing things." On the trail of the smugglers, Sky-High shoots down his brother's aircraft; Michael dies in his arms.

Sky-High keeps a rendezvous with the gang, disguised as his brother, and with aid from Army aircraft he dynamites their mountain stronghold while dealing with Delatour on the wings of his aircraft. Sky-High even ends up with his brother's girlfriend.

== Cast ==
- Al Wilson as "Sky-High"' Saunders / Michael Saunders
- Elsie Tarron as Helen Leland
- Frank Rice as "Whispering" Hicks
- Bud Osborne as George Delatour
- Billy "Red" Jones as Kid

== Production ==
Al Wilson was not only the star of Sky High Saunders but also flew as a "stunt pilot" in the film. After Wilson became a flying instructor and a short period as manager of the Mercury Aviation Company, founded by one of his students, Cecil B. DeMille, Wilson became more and more skilled in performing stunts, including wing-walking, and left the company to become a professional stunt pilot, specializing in Hollywood aviation films.

Production started on Sky High Saunders in 1927 at the newly established Wilson Aero Service at Glendale Airport, California. Wilson had joined with his brother, Roy, another pilot, to create a fixed-base operation that not only worked on Hollywood films but also offered charter and passenger flights.

Wilson worked together with stuntmen like Frank Clarke and Wally Timm and also for film companies, including Universal Pictures. After numerous appearances in stunt roles, he started his career as an actor in 1923 with the serial The Eagle's Talons. Wilson produced his own movies until 1927, when he went back to work with Universal. (Note: Wilson was one of the pilots flying in Hell's Angels (1930) and during filming, he was involved in an accident where the mechanic Phil Jones died. This episode marked the end of his career as stunt pilot in Hollywood.)

== Reception ==
Aviation film historian Stephen Pendo, in Aviation in the Cinema (1985) said Sky High Saunders was only one of a long list of aviation films that showcased Wilson's talents. He alternately wrote, acted and flew in a career that "spanned more than 10 years, and he acted in more films than any other professional pilot."
