= Three Miles Up =

1927 film

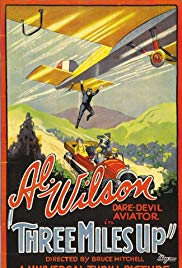
- Film poster
- Directed by: Bruce M. Mitchell
- Written by: Gardner Bradford (titles); Carl Krusada (scenario); Bruce M. Mitchell (story)
- Produced by: Carl Laemmle
- Starring: Al Wilson; William Malan; Ethlyne Clair
- Cinematography: William S. Adams (credited as William Adams)
- Production company: Universal Pictures (as Universal Thrill Feature)
- Distributed by: Universal Pictures
- Release date: September 4, 1927
- Country: United States
- Languages: Silent film English intertitles

Three Miles Up is a lost 1927 American silent action film directed by Bruce M. Mitchell. The film stars Al Wilson, William Malan and Ethlyne Clair. Three Miles Up was one of a series of films that showcased the exploits of the stunt pilots in Hollywood.

== Plot ==
Dick Morgan, formerly a professional crook, returns from the war as the "Ace" of his squadron and is met by his buddy, Dr. Worthing. Dick falls back into his old ways but is in love with Worthing's daughter, Nadine, and is determined to break his former criminal ties.

Threatened with exposure by his gang, Dick helps them in a jewel robbery. By feigning death in an accident and undergoing an operation to remove an identifying scar, he is able to return to the crooks' rendezvous and take back the stolen money unrecognized.

In a climactic air battle, the gang is forced down with the money, and Dick overtakes the leader when he attempts to escape in a car with Nadine.

== Cast ==
- Al Wilson as Dick Morgan ("Ace")
- William Malan as John Worthing
- Ethlyne Clair as Nadine Worthing
- William Clifford as "Boss" Scanlon
- Frank Rice as Professor
- Billy "Red" Jones as Kid
- Joseph Bennett as Garrett
- Art Goebel as Pilot
- Archie Ricks as Pilot

== Production ==
Al Wilson was not only the star of Three Miles Up but also flew as a "stunt pilot" in the film. After Wilson became a flying instructor and a short period as manager of the Mercury Aviation Company, founded by one of his students, Cecil B. DeMille, Wilson became more and more skilled in performing stunts, including wing-walking, and left the company to become a professional stunt pilot, specializing in Hollywood aviation films.

Production started on Three Miles Up in 1927 at the newly-established Wilson Aero Service at Glendale Airport, California. Art Goebel, another actor/pilot was involved. Wilson had joined with his brother, Roy, another pilot, to create a fixed-base operation that not only worked on Hollywood films but also offered charter and passenger flights.

Wilson worked together with stuntmen like Frank Clarke and Wally Timm and also for film companies, including Universal Pictures. After numerous appearances in stunt roles, he started his career as an actor in 1923 with the serial The Eagle's Talons. Wilson produced his own movies until 1927, when he went back to work with Universal. (Note: Wilson was one of the pilots flying in Hell's Angels (1930) and during filming, he was involved in an accident where the mechanic Phil Jones died. This episode marked the end of his career as stunt pilot in Hollywood.)

== Reception ==
Aviation film historian Stephen Pendo, in Aviation in the Cinema (1985) said Three Miles Up was only one of a long list of aviation films that showcased Wilson's talents. He alternately wrote, acted and flew in a career that "spanned more than 10 years, and he acted in more films than any other professional pilot."

In Three Miles Up, Pendo noted the aerial stunts featured Wilson who "as a former ace forced into crime and then trying to escape his situation." The film had Wilson in a spectacular stunt, jumping "from one plane to another by lassoing one aircraft and swinging on the rope."

== Preservation ==
With no holdings located in archives, Three Miles Up is considered a lost film.
