= Flyin' Thru =

1925 film

- Directed by: Bruce M. Mitchell
- Written by: George W. Pyper; Al Wilson (story)
- Produced by: Al Wilson
- Starring: Al Wilson; Elinor Fair; George B. French
- Production company: Aywon Film Corporation (Al Wilson Productions)
- Distributed by: distributed on State Rights basis by Davis Distributing Division
- Release date: December 1925
- Running time: 5 reels
- Country: United States
- Language: Silent (English intertitles)

Flyin' Thru (aka Flying Through) is a 1925 American silent Western and aviation film directed by Bruce M. Mitchell and starring Al Wilson, Elinor Fair, and George B. French. The film was written and produced by Al Wilson. Flyin' Thru was one of a series of films that showcased the exploits of the stunt pilots in Hollywood.

== Plot ==
Aviator Lt. Al Wilson returns home from World War I combat duty in France to find his father, a cotton farmer, in jail for the murder of neighbour Jud Blair. This was a crime actually committed by dancehall proprietor Melvin Parker. Al becomes partners with an ex-sergeant he knew in France, and they buy an aircraft with which they go barnstorming around the country, all the while looking for clues to reveal the real murderer.

At a bullfight across the border, Sybil, Parker's dancehall sweetheart, becomes infatuated with Al and betrays Parker. Parker flees in an automobile, but Al flies after him, leaps from his aircraft into the speeding automobile, and overcomes Parker. His father is set free, and Al weds Ann, Blair's daughter, in an aircraft far above the clouds.

== Cast ==
- Al Wilson as Lt. Wilson
- Elinor Fair as Anne Blair
- George B. French as Judson Blair (Credited as George French)
- James McElhern as Jim Willis
- Clarence Burton as Melvin Parker
- Fontaine La Rue as Sybil
- Garry O'Dell as Bill Goofus
- Zella Ingraham (uncredited)

== Production ==
Al Wilson was not only the star of Flyin' Thru but he also wrote and produced as well as flying as a "stunt pilot" in the film. After Wilson became a flying instructor and a short period as manager of the Mercury Aviation Company, founded by one of his students, Cecil B. DeMille, Wilson became more and more skilled in performing stunts, including wing-walking, and left the company to become a professional stunt pilot, specializing in Hollywood aviation films.

Wilson worked together with stuntmen like Frank Tomick, Frank Clarke and Wally Timm and also worked independently for film companies. After numerous appearances in stunt roles, he started his career as an actor in 1923 with the serial The Eagle's Talons.Later in his film career, Wilson worked exclusively with Universal Pictures.

Wilson produced his own movies until 1927, when he went back to work with Universal. (Note: Wilson was one of the pilots flying in Hell's Angels (1930) and during filming, he was involved in an accident where the mechanic Phil Jones died. This episode marked the end of his career as stunt pilot in Hollywood.)

== Reception ==
Aviation film historian Stephen Pendo, in Aviation in the Cinema (1985) said Flyin' Thru was only one of a long list of aviation films that showcased Wilson's talents. He alternately wrote, acted and flew in a career that "spanned more than 10 years, and he acted in more films than any other professional pilot."
