= The Air Hawk =

1923 film

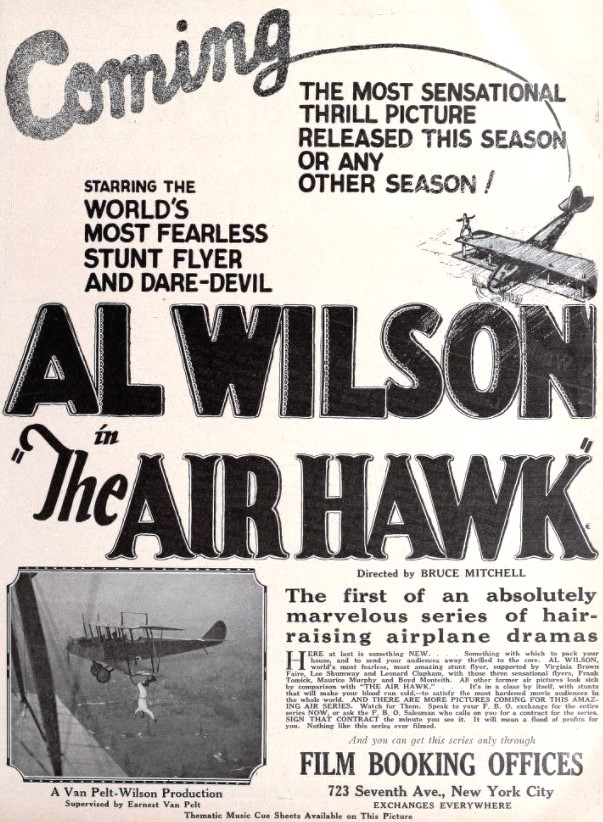
- Advertisement
- Directed by: Bruce M. Mitchell
- Written by: Della M. King (titles)
- Story by: George W. Pyper
- Produced by: Carl Laemmle
- Starring: Al Wilson; Virginia Brown Faire
- Cinematography: Bert Longenecker
- Edited by: Della M. King
- Production company: Universal Pictures
- Distributed by: Universal Pictures
- Release date: December 1, 1924
- Running time: 5 reels; 45 minutes (per AFI)
- Country: United States
- Language: Silent (English intertitles)

The Air Hawk is a 1924 American silent action adventure film directed by Bruce M. Mitchell and starring real life aviator Al Wilson. The aviation film was produced and distributed by Universal Pictures.

Like many actors in the silent film era, Wilson did not survive the transition to "talkies", with The Air Hawk, an example of his early work.

== Plot ==
As described in a review in a film magazine, John Ames, superintendent of an Arizona platinum mine, cannot discover the desperadoes who regularly steal from the mine. He and his daughter Edith suspect Robert MacLeod, who has offered to buy the mine and assume responsibility if Edith will marry him. She is in love with Al Parker, a mining engineer. Ames finds a secret passage the thieves have been using and is killed by them. MacLeod blames “The Air Hawk,” a mysterious aviator, but Edith will not believe him because the aviator has befriended her on several occasions. MacLeod abducts her in his airplane; the Air Hawk follows and leaps from his airplane into MacLeod's airplane overcoming the villain. It develops that the Air Hawk and Parker are one — a secret agent of the government sent to ferret out the mystery of the platinum thefts. Al is happily reunited Edith, with whom he has fallen in love.

== Cast ==
- Al Wilson as Al Parker / The Air Hawk (only cast member who is credited)

Rest of cast listed alphabetically

- Virginia Brown Faire as Edith
- Emmett King as John Ames (credited as Emmett C. King)
- Tom London as Kellar (credited as Leonard Clapham)
- Frank Rice as Hank
- Lee Shumway as Hobert McLeod
- Frank Tomick as Maj. Falles

== Production ==
Al Wilson was not only the star of The Air Hawk but also flew as a "stunt pilot" in the film. After becoming a flying instructor and a short period as manager of the Mercury Aviation Company, founded by one of his students, Cecil B. DeMille, Wilson became more and more skilled in performing stunts, including wing-walking, and left the company to become a professional stunt pilot, specializing in Hollywood aviation films.

Wilson worked together with stuntmen like Frank Clarke and Wally Timm and also for film companies, including Universal Pictures. After numerous appearances in stunt roles, he started his career as an actor in 1923 with the serial The Eagle's Talons. In The Air Hawk, another pilot/actor was Frank Tomick who flew one of the two Curtiss JN-4 aircraft that were involved in the mid-air battles.

Wilson produced his own movies until 1927, when he went back to work with Universal. (Note: Wilson was one of the pilots flying in Hell's Angels (1930) and during filming, he was involved in an accident where the mechanic Phil Jones died. This episode marked the end of his career as stunt pilot in Hollywood.)

== Reception ==
Aviation film historian Stephen Pendo in Aviation in the Cinema (1985) said The Air Hawk was only one of a long list of aviation films that showcased Wilson's talents. He alternately wrote, acted, and flew in a career that "spanned more than 10 years, and he acted in more films than any other professional pilot." In The Air Hawk, Pendo noted the aerial stunts featured "a mid-air leap between planes."
