= The Sky Skidder =

1929 film

- Film poster
- Directed by: Bruce M. Mitchell
- Screenplay by: Carl Krusada; Gardner Bradford
- Story by: Carl Krusada
- Starring: Al Wilson; Helen Foster; Wilbur McGaugh; Gilbert Holmes
- Cinematography: William S. Adams
- Edited by: Harry Marker
- Production company: Universal Pictures
- Distributed by: Universal Pictures
- Release date: January 13, 1929
- Running time: 57 minutes
- Country: United States
- Language: Silent (English intertitles)

The Sky Skidder is a 1929 American silent action film directed by Bruce M. Mitchell and written by Carl Krusada and Gardner Bradford. The film stars Al Wilson, Helen Foster, Wilbur McGaugh, and Gilbert Holmes. The film was released on January 13, 1929, by Universal Pictures.

Like many actors in the silent film era, Wilson did not survive the transition to "talkies", with The Sky Skidder, his penultimate film.

== Plot ==
As described in a film magazine, Al Simpkins is an ambitious aviator who has invented a new fuel he calls "Economo" which, he declares, will allow a plane to fly 1000 miles on a pint. He makes a trial flight on the fuel and, while in the air, sees his sweetheart Stella Hearns riding in a car with the wealthy and dishonest Silas Smythe. Just as the car gets out of control, Al sweeps down and rescues her by means of a rope ladder from his plane. Back at the flying field, Silas overhears Al telling Stella there is just enough Economo left for a trial flight the next day. Silas steals the mixture that night and refills the tank with gasoline. When Al makes the exhibition the next day his plane runs out of fuel and he is forced to jump from the plane and land by parachute. The folks in Centerville lose all faith in Al's invention. Al then enters the air derby with a powerful monoplane which he purchased with funds borrowed from Stella, he has a tank full of Economo. He gives her the formula for the fuel which Silas steals from her just before the takeoff. Al then takes Stella in his plane and they go into the air after Silas to get the formula back. Stella takes the controls and Al reaches Silas’ plane via a rope ladder where, after a terrific fight, he retrieves the formula. After winning the race, Al claims and Stella consents to become his bride.

== Cast ==
- Al Wilson as Al Simpkins
- Helen Foster as Stella Hearns
- Wilbur McGaugh as Silas Smythe
- Gilbert Holmes as Bert Beatle (credited as "Pee Wee Holmes")

== Production ==
Al Wilson was not only the star of The Sky Skidder but also flew as a stunt pilot in the film. After becoming a flying instructor and a short period as manager of the Mercury Aviation Company, founded by one of his students, Cecil B. DeMille, Wilson became more and more skilled in performing stunts, including wing walking. He left the company to become a professional stunt pilot, specializing in Hollywood aviation films.

Wilson worked together with stuntmen like Frank Clarke and Wally Timm and also for film companies, including Universal Pictures. After numerous appearances in stunt roles, he started his career as an actor in 1923 with the serial The Eagle's Talons. Wilson produced his own movies until 1927, when he went back to work with Universal Pictures. (Note: Wilson was one of the pilots flying in Hell's Angels (1930) and during filming, he was involved in an accident where the mechanic Phil Jones died. This episode marked the end of his career as stunt pilot in Hollywood.)

== Reception ==
Aviation film historian Stephen Pendo in Aviation in the Cinema (1985) said that The Sky Skidder was only one of a long list of aviation films that showcased Wilson's talents. He alternately wrote, acted and flew in a career that "spanned more than 10 years, and he acted in more films than any other professional pilot." In The Sky Skidder, Pendo noted, "The aerial stunts featured a parachute jump, a faked plane change, and the pick-up of the heroine from a car by the hero on a ladder hanging from a plane."
