= The Air Patrol =

1928 American silent film by Bruce M. Mitchell

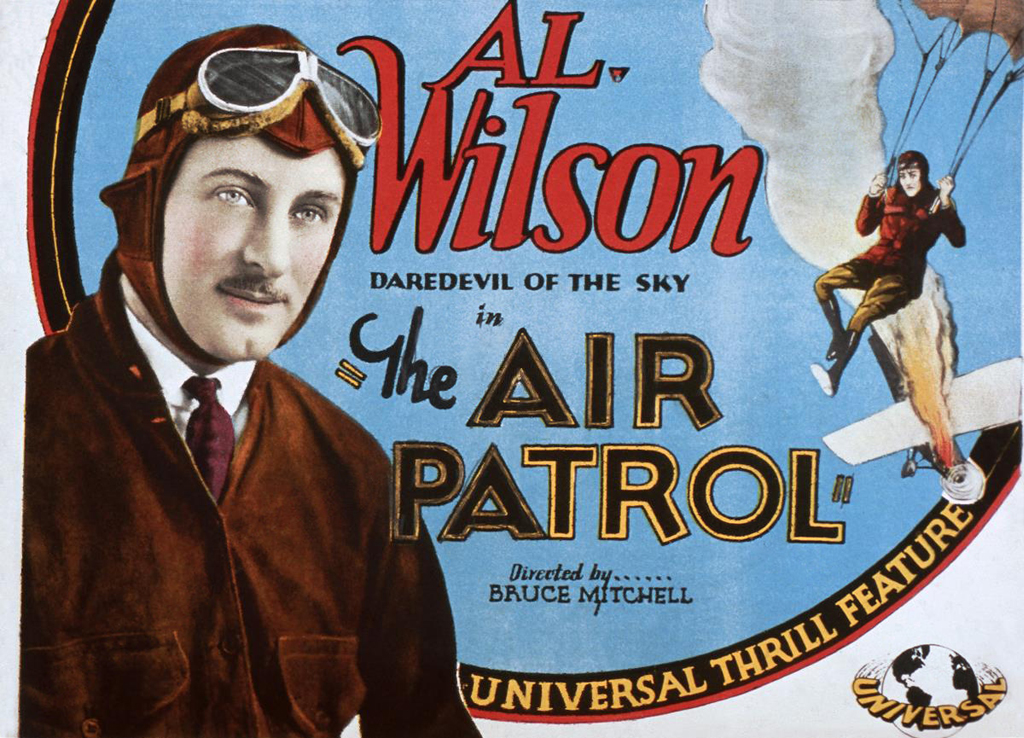
- Lobby card
- Directed by: Bruce M. Mitchell
- Screenplay by: William Berke; Gardner Bradford
- Story by: Al Wilson
- Produced by: Carl Laemmle
- Starring: Al Wilson; Elsa Benham; Jack Mower; Frank Tomick; Monte Montague; Taylor N. Duncan
- Cinematography: William S. Adams
- Edited by: De Leon Anthony
- Production company: Universal Pictures
- Distributed by: Universal Pictures
- Release date: January 1, 1928
- Running time: 50 minutes
- Country: United States
- Language: Silent (English intertitles)

The Air Patrol is a 1928 American silent drama film directed by Bruce M. Mitchell and written by William Berke and Gardner Bradford from a story by Al Wilson, the film's star. The film stars Al Wilson, Elsa Benham, Jack Mower, Frank Tomick, Monte Montague, and Taylor N. Duncan. The film was released on January 1, 1928, by Universal Pictures. The Air Patrol was one of a series of films that showcased the exploits of the stunt pilots in Hollywood.

== Plot ==
Special agent Captain Al Langdon of the Air Patrol forces "Flash" Kelly, a suspected diamond smuggler, to land, but when he proves to be the wrong man, Langdon's suspicion is directed toward Michael Revere as the leader of the gang.

During an outing with his neighbor Mary Lacy, Revere finds Langdon, in an apparently drunken state, parachuting from an aircraft. In spite of Mary's intercession in his behalf, Langdon is dismissed and later offers his services to Revere as a ruse to aid in capturing the gang.

Langdon is captured through Mary's innocent revelation of a secret message, but she discovers Revere's true nature. She also realizes Langdon's real purpose. Both are captured, with Langdon bound hand-and-foot and locked in a shack. When Revere forces Mary onto his aircraft, Langdon escapes in time to give chase to Revere and overpowers the smugglers. Langdon not only is restored to his position in the Air Patrol, he also wins the affection of the young woman.

== Cast ==
- Al Wilson as Al Langdon
- Elsa Benham as Mary Lacy
- Jack Mower as Michael Rovere
- Frank Tomick as "Flash" Kelly
- Monte Montague as Professor Simeon Swivel
- Taylor N. Duncan as Captain Carter
- Art Goebel as Aviator
- Frank Clarke as Lt. Blount

== Production ==
Al Wilson was not only the star of The Air Patrol but also flew as a "stunt pilot" in the film. After Wilson became a flying instructor and a short period as manager of the Mercury Aviation Company, founded by one of his students, Cecil B. DeMille, Wilson became more and more skilled in performing stunts, including wing-walking, and left the company to become a professional stunt pilot, specializing in Hollywood aviation films.

Production started on The Air Patrol in 1928 at the newly established Wilson Aero Service at Glendale Airport, California. Actor pilots Art Goebel, Frank Tomick, and Frank Clarke were in the film, flying the chase and "pickup" aircraft. Wilson had joined with his brother, Roy, another pilot, to create a fixed-base operation that not only worked on Hollywood films but also offered charter and passenger flights.

Wilson worked together with stuntmen like Frank Clarke and Wally Timm and also for film companies, including Universal Pictures. After numerous appearances in stunt roles, he started his career as an actor in 1923 with the serial The Eagle's Talons. Wilson produced his own movies until 1927, when he went back to work with Universal. (Note: Wilson was one of the pilots flying in Hell's Angels (1930) and during filming, he was involved in an accident where the mechanic Phil Jones died. This episode marked the end of his career as stunt pilot in Hollywood.)

== Reception ==
Aviation film historian Stephen Pendo, in Aviation in the Cinema (1985) said The Air Patrol was only one of a long list of aviation films that showcased Wilson's talents. He alternately wrote, acted and flew in a career that "spanned more than 10 years, and he acted in more films than any other professional pilot."

In The Air Patrol, Pendo noted the aerial stunts featured Wilson who was "battling diamond smugglers in an almost non-existent plot."

Film reviewer Hal Erickson in AllMovie. com described "The Air Patrol", as one of real-life "flyboy Al Wilson" who starred in "a string of successful silent aviation epics, of which '(The) Air Patrol' was typical ..." with aerial stunts, "leading to a thrill-packed conclusion high above the clouds."

== Preservation ==
With no prints of The Air Patrol located in any film archives, it is a lost film.
