= The Cloud Rider =

1925 film by Bruce M. Mitchell

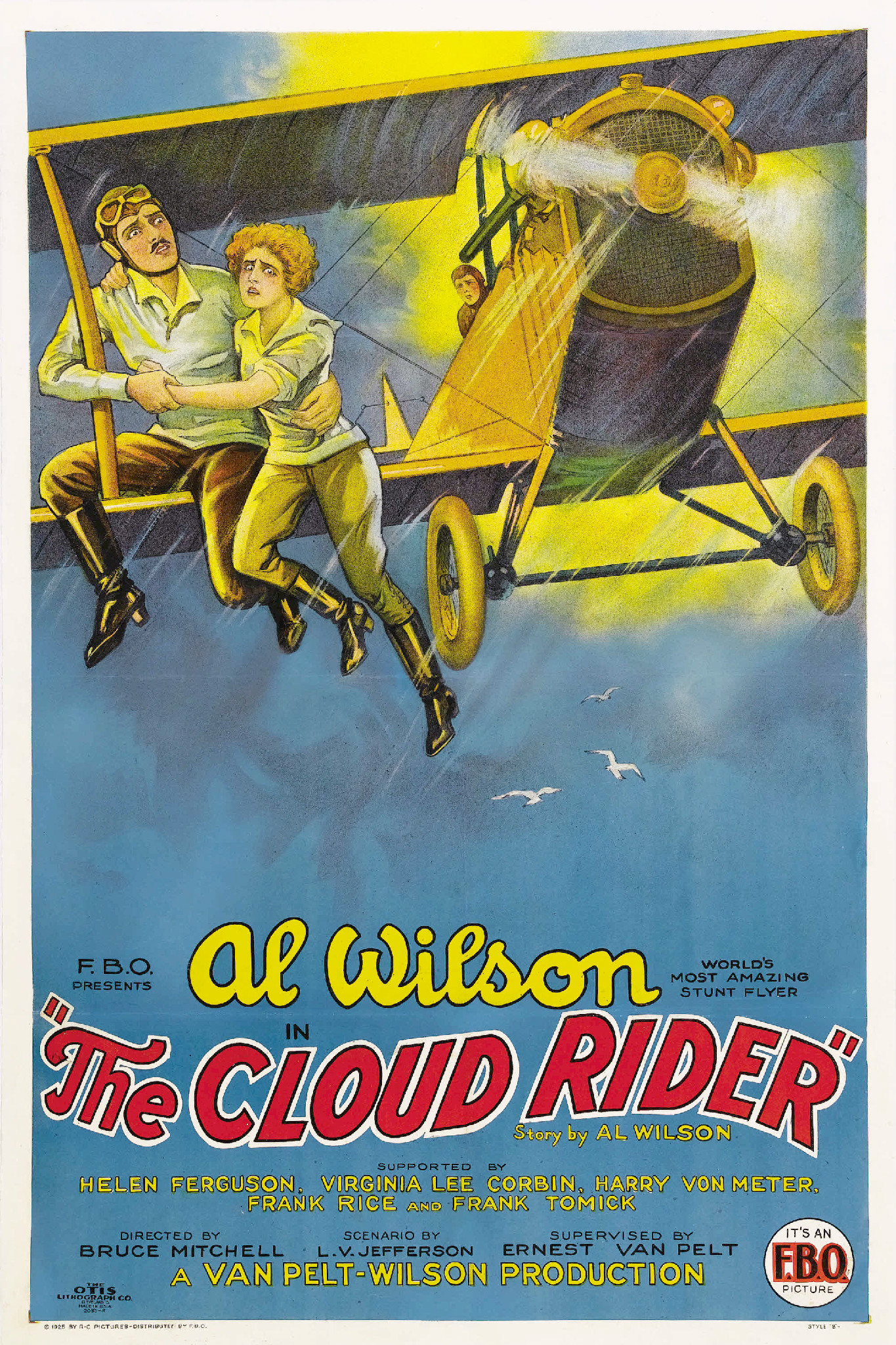
- Film poster
- Directed by: Bruce M. Mitchell
- Written by: Al Wilson (story) [L. V. Jefferson]] (scenario)
- Produced by: Al Wilson; Ernest Van Pelt (supervising producer)
- Starring: Al Wilson; Virginia Lee Corbin; Harry von Meter
- Cinematography: Lige Zerr
- Production company: Van Pelt-Wilson Productions
- Distributed by: FBO
- Release date: February 15, 1925
- Running time: 5 reels
- Country: United States
- Language: Silent (English intertitles)

The Cloud Rider is a 1925 American silent action adventure aviation film directed by Bruce M. Mitchell and starring Al Wilson and Virginia Lee Corbin. It was distributed by Film Booking Offices of America.The Cloud Rider was one of a series of films that showcased the exploits of the stunt pilots in Hollywood.

== Plot ==
As described in a review in a film magazine, champion aviator Bruce Torrence and member of the secret service has a formidable rival for the hand of Zella Wingate in the person of Juan Lascelles, who owns a fleet of airplanes used to smuggle drugs. Thinking to get rid of Bruce, Juan loosens a wheel on the airplane. Zella goes up in the machine and is saved from death by Bruce who makes a thrilling transfer to the airplane in midair. Later, Bruce finds Zella in Juan's arms. Zella's little sister Blythe, forbidden to attend a party, goes to the beach and finds Juan talking to his henchmen. Reporting to Bruce, he starts out after Juan's machine. Blythe hides in the fuselage and accidentally wrecks the airplane by monkeying with the control wires. Bruce and Blythe find themselves in the woods and Bruce realizes that it is Blythe that he loves. They are captured by Juan who takes Blythe away in his airplane. Bruce escapes with the aid of a former buddy among Juan's henchman. Bruce gives chase. Blythe operates the controls and causes the airplane to drop into the water. Bruce jumps from his machine and saves Blythe and captures Juan. Bruce and Blythe start out on their aerial honeymoon.

== Cast ==
- Al Wilson as Bruce Torrence
- Virginia Lee Corbin as Blythe Wingate
- Harry von Meter as Juan Lascelles
- Helen Ferguson as Zella Wingate
- Frank Rice as Hank Higgins
- Melbourne MacDowell as David Torrence
- Brinsley Shaw as Peter Wingate
- Frank Tomick as Pilot
- Boyd Monteith as Pilot
- Frank Clarke as Pilot

== Production ==
Al Wilson was not only the star of The Cloud Rider but also gathered together friends who would form a "flying circus". Wilson worked together with stuntmen like Frank Clarke and Wally Timm primarily for film companies, flying as a "stunt pilot" in the films. After Wilson became a flying instructor and a short period as manager of the Mercury Aviation Company, founded by one of his students, Cecil B. DeMille.

Wilson became more and more skilled in performing stunts, including wing-walking, and left the company to become a professional stunt pilot, specializing in Hollywood aviation films. After numerous appearances in stunt roles, he started his career as an actor in 1923 with the serial The Eagle's Talons.

The Cloud Rider was one of the first films in a five-year period where Wilson alternately wrote, acted and flew in a career that "spanned more than 10 years, and he acted in more films than any other professional pilot."

Wilson produced his own movies until 1927, when he went back to work with Universal Pictures, where he had made strong business connections. (Note: Wilson was one of the pilots flying in Hell's Angels (1930) and during filming, he was involved in an accident where the mechanic Phil Jones died. This episode marked the end of his career as stunt pilot in Hollywood.)

== Reception ==
Wilson made an appearance in person on stage when The Cloud Rider was premiered at the California Theatre in down-town Los Angeles.

Aviation film historian Stephen Pendo, in Aviation in the Cinema (1985) said The Cloud Rider was only one of a long list of aviation films that showcased Wilson's talents. The film featured a dangerous aerial stunt where a transfer from aircraft to aircraft involved a "missing wheel" that had to be re-attached. "Further aerial action included a plane crash in the ocean."

== Preservation ==
A copy of The Cloud Rider is preserved in the Cineteca Italiana, Milan.
