= The Flying Mail =

1926 film

- Al Wilson hanging from an aircraft; one of the stunts in The Flying Mail.
- Directed by: Noel M. Smith
- Written by: Frank Howard Clark
- Starring: Al Wilson; Joseph W. Girard; Kathleen Myers
- Production company: Al Wilson Productions
- Distributed by: Associated Exhibitors
- Release date: September 10, 1926
- Country: United States
- Languages: Silent film; English intertitles

The Flying Mail is a 1926 American silent action film directed by Noel M. Smith. The film stars Al Wilson, Joseph W. Girard and Kathleen Myers. The Flying Mail was one of a series of films that showcased the exploits of the air mail service.

== Plot ==
Following a party, Sherry Gillespie, a U. S. Mail flyer, awakes to find himself in a strange apartment and is shown evidence by Cleo Roberts that they were married the previous evening. Bart Sheldon, the leader of a gang, plots with a henchman to fly Sherry's aircraft and cautions Cleo not to let the pilot escape.

When Sherry escapes, however, and returns to the flying field, he is suspended by his employer. His estranged fiancée Alice is heartbroken when learning about Cleo, who is scheming with Sheldon to obtain part of an inheritance that Sherry is to receive if he earns $10,000 in a year.

Following a series of fast complications, Sherry decides to clear his name. He tracks down the gang, and swinging from a motorcycle to a rope ladder, he mounts the villain's aircraft wing and fights hand-to-hand with Sheldon. He and Sheldon parachute to the ground. When the gang leader is arrested, Sherry is finally vindicated in the eyes of his fiancée and his employer.

== Cast ==
- Al Wilson as Sherry Gillespie
- Joseph W. Girard as Martin Hardwick
- Kathleen Myers as Alice Hardwick
- Carmelita Geraghty as Cleo Roberts
- Harry von Meter as Bart Sheldon
- Eddie Gribbon as 'Gluefoot' Jones
- Frank Tomick as Tom Corrigan

== Production ==
Al Wilson was not only the star of The Flying Mail but also flew as a "stunt pilot" in the film. After Wilson became a flying instructor and a short period as manager of the Mercury Aviation Company, founded by one of his students, Cecil B. DeMille, Wilson became more and more skilled in performing stunts, including wing-walking, and left the company to become a professional stunt pilot, specializing in Hollywood aviation films.

Production started on The Flying Mail in 1925 at the Antelope Valley, north of Los Angeles. Wilson had Frank Tomick, another pilot/actor in one of the supporting roles, fly the "pickup" aircraft for Wilson's stunts.

Wilson worked together with stuntmen like Frank Clarke and Wally Timm and also for film companies, including Universal Pictures. After numerous appearances in stunt roles, he started his career as an actor in 1923 with the serial The Eagle's Talons. Wilson produced his own movies until 1927, when he went back to work with Universal. (Note: Wilson was one of the pilots flying in Hell's Angels (1930) and during filming, he was involved in an accident where the mechanic Phil Jones died. This episode marked the end of his career as stunt pilot in Hollywood.)

== Reception ==
Aviation film historian Stephen Pendo, in Aviation in the Cinema (1985) said The Flying Mail was only one of a long list of aviation films that showcased Wilson's talents. He alternately wrote, acted and flew in a career that "spanned more than 10 years, and he acted in more films than any other professional pilot."

In The Flying Mail, Pendo noted the aerial stunts featured Wilson who "jumped from a motorcycle to a ladder suspended from a plane, fought a hand-to-hand battle on the plane's wing, and made a two-man, one-parachute drop – all, as a title in the film clearly stated, with no double or trick photography."
