= The Cloud Dodger =

1928 film

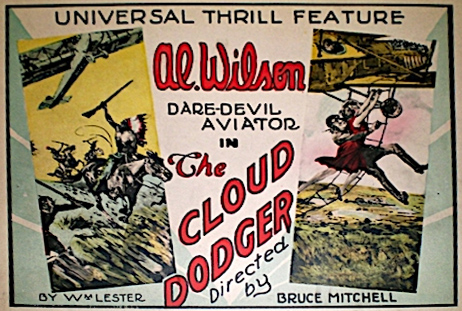
- Lobby card
- Directed by: Bruce M. Mitchell
- Written by: William B. Lester (story, adaptation); Gardner Bradford (intertitles)
- Produced by: Carl Laemmle
- Starring: Al Wilson; Gloria Grey
- Cinematography: William S. Adams
- Edited by: Jack Bruggy
- Production company: Universal Pictures
- Distributed by: Universal Pictures
- Release date: September 30, 1928
- Running time: 5 reels; 45 minutes (per AFI)
- Country: United States
- Language: Silent (English intertitles)

The Cloud Dodger is a 1928 American silent drama film directed by Bruce M. Mitchell and starring real life aviator Al Wilson. The action film was produced and distributed by Universal Pictures.

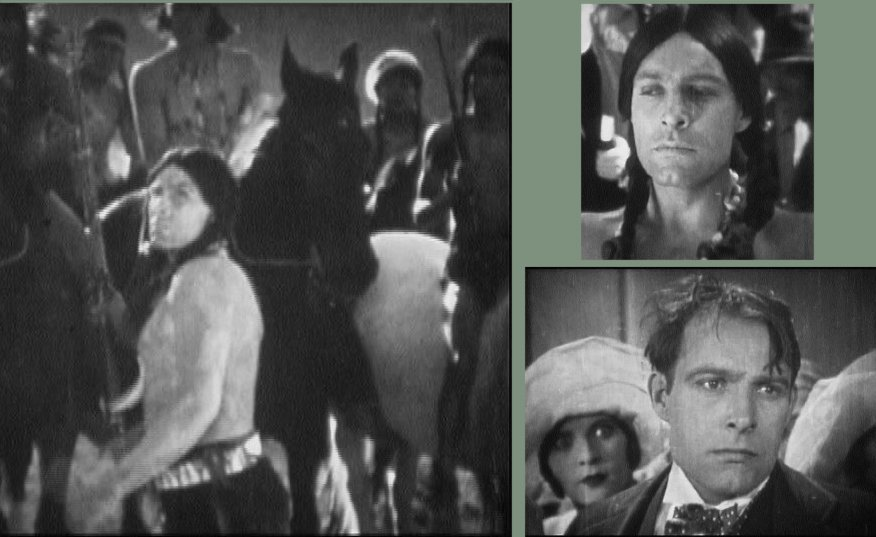
Joe O'Brien shown above was a Hollywood actor for 9 years, this being one of his first films before he became a director.

Like many actors in the silent film era, Wilson did not survive the transition to "talkies", with The Cloud Dodger being one of his last films.

== Plot ==
As described in a film magazine, Al Williams, a thrill-mad member of the younger generation, is out riding with his sweetheart Sylvia Le Moyne when he steps on the gas and is pursued by a motorcycle police officer. He drives at full speed to the flying field where his plane is in readiness and with Sylvia takes into the air. The officer however, calls the aerial police and, after a strenuous chase in the clouds, the police plane is wrecked and Al is taken prisoner. Sylvia refuses to marry him on account of his wildness. However, her aunt Myrtle insists that she marry at once so she is forced to accept the proposal of the wealthy Stanton Stevens. Al learns of this and goes to his apartment quite down-hearted where he later dozes off. He dreams that he is fifty years back in history, in the west of the 1870s. Stevens is a renegade white who leads the Indians in revolt and they capture Sylvia. Stevens is about to marry her when Al comes along in his plane and drops in using a parachute in time to break up the wedding. Al awakes and sits up. The dream gives Al an idea and he rushes to Sylvia's house in time to stop the real wedding. Stevens knocks Al out and kidnaps Sylvia in his plane but is pursued by Al. After a terrific battle on the wing of Stevens’ plane, Al takes Sylvia to his plane using a rope ladder. Since his plane is fully equipped with a minister and witness, the couple are married in the air after Al promises to settle down.

== Cast ==
- Al Wilson as Al Williams
- Gloria Grey as Sylvia Lemoyne
- Joe O'Brien as Stanton Stevens
- Julia Griffith as Mrs. Lemoyne / Aunt Myrtle
- Gilbert Holmes as Joe Merriman

== Production ==
Al Wilson was not only the star of The Cloud Dodger but also flew as a "stunt pilot" in the film. After becoming a flying instructor and a short period as manager of the Mercury Aviation Company, founded by one of his students, Cecil B. DeMille, Wilson became more and more skilled in performing stunts, including wing-walking, and left the company to become a professional stunt pilot, specializing in Hollywood aviation films.

Wilson worked together with stuntmen like Frank Clarke and Wally Timm and also for film companies, including Universal Pictures. After numerous appearances in stunt roles, he started his career as an actor in 1923 with the serial The Eagle's Talons. Wilson produced his own movies until 1927, when he went back to work with Universal. (Note: Wilson was one of the pilots flying in Hell's Angels (1930) and during filming, he was involved in an accident where the mechanic Phil Jones died. This episode marked the end of his career as stunt pilot in Hollywood.)

== Reception ==
Aviation film historian Stephen Pendo, in Aviation in the Cinema (1985) said The Cloud Dodger was only one of a long list of aviation films that showcased Wilson's talents. He alternately wrote, acted and flew in a career that "spanned more than 10 years, and he acted in more films than any other professional pilot." In The Cloud Dodger, Pendo noted the aerial stunts featured an "elopement and fight in the air" with a pick-up of the heroine from another aircraft by the hero on a ladder hanging from his own aircraft.

== Preservation ==
Prints of The Cloud Dodger are held by George Eastman Museum and the Library of Congress.
