= Won in the Clouds =

1928 film by Bruce M. Mitchell

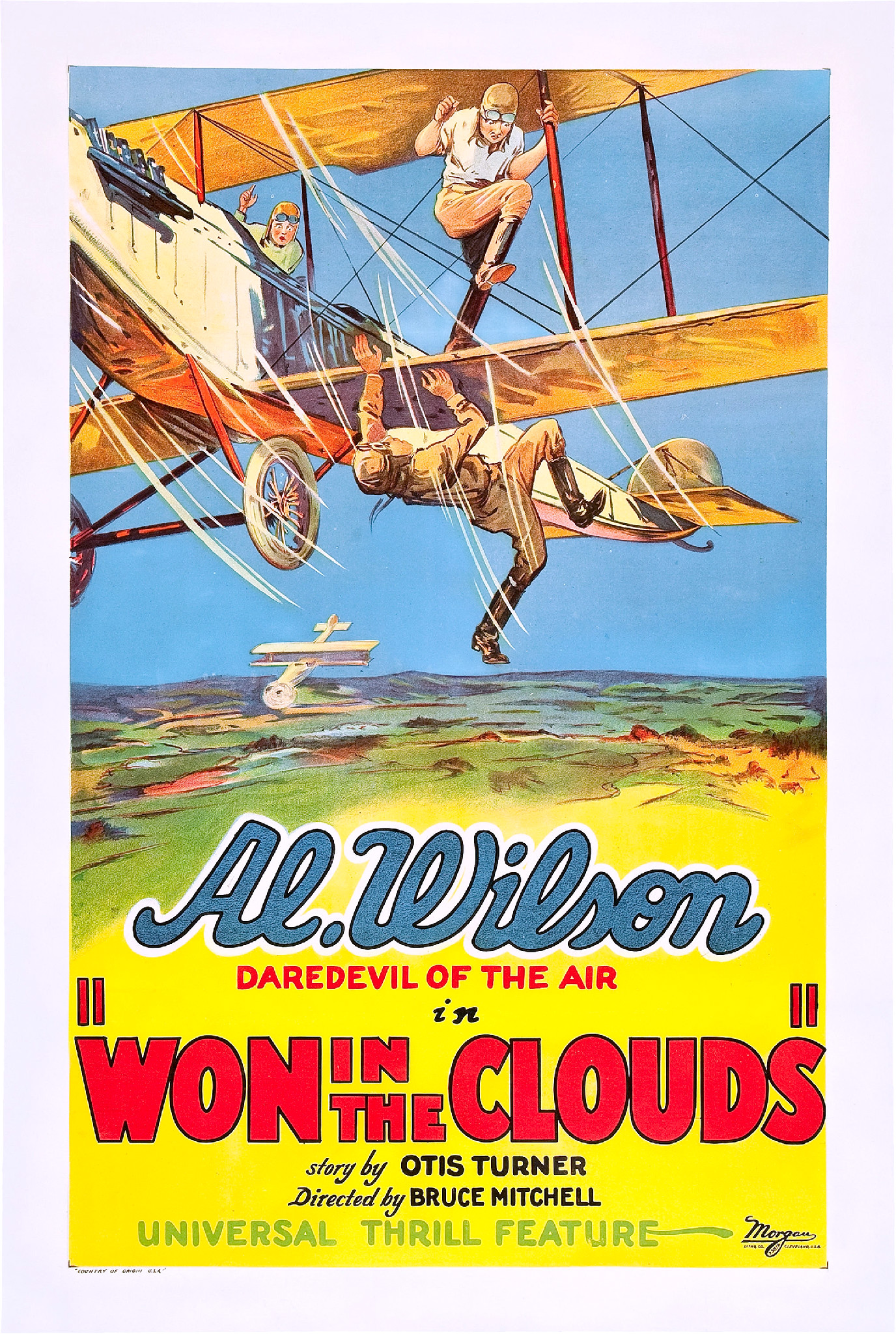
- Film poster
- Directed by: Bruce M. Mitchell
- Written by: Carl Krusada (adaptation and screenplay); Gardner Bradford (titles)
- Produced by: Carl Laemmle
- Starring: Al Wilson; Helen Foster; Frank Rice
- Cinematography: William S. Adams
- Edited by: De Leon Anthony
- Production company: Universal Pictures
- Distributed by: Universal Pictures
- Release date: April 22, 1928
- Running time: 52 minutes
- Country: United States
- Languages: Silent; English intertitles

Won in the Clouds is a 1928 American silent adventure film directed by Bruce M. Mitchell and starring Al Wilson.

Like many actors in the silent film era, Wilson did not survive the transition to "talkies", with Won in the Clouds, one of his last films.

== Plot ==
Won in the Clouds (1928)

A family diamond mine in South Africa causes great problems to owners Dr. Cecil James and his daughter, Grace. Accompanied by her maid, Mira, Grace and her father decide to go to Africa to investigate. They arrange to meet Jack Woods, manager of the Consolidated Diamond Mining Co., who has used the excuse of a native plague to close the mine and hold up shipments.

Being advised by his men of the doctor's visit, Woods has the party waylaid by Swahili warriors. The two girls flee and Wood "rescues" them, taking them to the a building at the mine site. Fearing for their safety, back home, Sir Henry Blake sends his son, Art, after them, and he succeeds in eluding the gang at the mine.

Art sneaks into the Swahili village and frees the doctor but is himself captured and thrown in a lions' den, from which, however, he escapes. Woods forces Grace to accompany him in a getaway by air. Art pursues in another aircraft and in an air battle, subdues the villain, who falls to his death.

== Cast ==
- Al Wilson as Art Blake
- Helen Foster as Grace James
- Frank Rice as Percy Hogan
- George B. French as Dr. Cecil James (credited as George French)
- Joseph Bennett as Portuguese Jack Woods (credited as Joe Bennett)
- Albert Prisco as Bangula
- Myrtis Crinley as Mira
- Frank Tomick as Henchman
- Roy Wilson as Henchman
- Ivan Unger as Henchman (credited as Evan Unger)
- Red Sly as Henchman
- Art Goebel as Sam Highflyer

== Production ==
Al Wilson was not only the star of Won in the Clouds but also flew as a "stunt pilot" in the film. After becoming a flying instructor and a short period as manager of the Mercury Aviation Company, founded by one of his students, Cecil B. DeMille, Wilson became more and more skilled in performing stunts, including wing-walking, and left the company to become a professional stunt pilot, specializing in Hollywood aviation films.

Wilson worked together with stuntmen like Frank Clarke and Wally Timm and also for film companies, including Universal Pictures. After numerous appearances in stunt roles, he started his career as an actor in 1923 with the serial The Eagle's Talons. Wilson produced his own movies until 1927, when he went back to work with Universal. (Note: Wilson was one of the pilots flying in Hell's Angels (1930) and during filming, he was involved in an accident where the mechanic Phil Jones died. This episode marked the end of his career as stunt pilot in Hollywood.)

== Reception ==
Aviation film historian Stephen Pendo, in Aviation in the Cinema (1985) said Won in the Clouds was only one of a long list of aviation films that showcased Wilson's talents. He alternately wrote, acted and flew in a career that "spanned more than 10 years, and he acted in more films than any other professional pilot." In Won in the Clouds, Pendo noted the aerial stunts were essentially repeated from those in his earlier films.

Aviation film historian Michael Paris in From the Wright Brothers to Top Gun: Aviation, Nationalism, and Popular Cinema (1995) agreed that Won in the Clouds, "merely repeated the formula."

== Preservation status ==
Won in the Clouds is preserved by the UCLA Film & Television Archive.
