= Associated Motion Picture Pilots =

Former trade union of the United States

Associated Motion Picture Pilots (AMPP) was a union of aviators who worked as stunt pilots in the Hollywood film industry. The group, one of the first unions in film work, was organized by Pancho Barnes in 1931 and formally established on January 4, 1932. It established "a virtual monopoly on motion picture flying".

== Union formation ==
During the silent film era, stunt pilots were self-employed. In 1924, three aviators formed "The Black Cats" union, later gaining ten more members to make "Thirteen Black Cats." The Black Cats were the first to set a standard for stunt flier wages. The Black Cats performed stunts live in front of crowds as well as for films. At the end of the 1920s, some of the fliers had died and others changed careers.

In September 1930, Pancho Barnes met with several aviators and began to organize more pilots so that they could take more control of filming conditions and increase the safety of stunts in what was an extremely dangerous line of work. They also sought insurance for medical emergencies caused by flying accidents, and they wished to set a standard for payment, using the fee scale first established by the Black Cats.

The AMPP pushed for a minimum standard of pay for pilots performing stunts in films. AMPP aviators were paid $350 per week of filming in addition to fees paid for more dangerous stunts. In 1938, the AMPP modified this to $50 per eight-hour day of straight flying and $100 per day of stunt flying.

== Members ==
Some of the charter members were Frank Clarke, Al Wilson, and Dick Grace. Leo Nomis was chosen the first president, but was dead a month later in a plane crash while filming aerial scenes for Sky Bride. Nomis had been doubling for lead actor Jack Holt who was himself a stunt man but was not an aviator. Clarke picked up the presidency after the death of Nomis. By 1938, Grace was serving as president.

The stunt pilot Paul Mantz had been asking for less money than AMPP standards and had been taking work from union pilots. When Mantz decided to join AMPP so that he could get more money, AMPP required of him more than the usual challenges. Mantz performed 46 outside loops in a row, setting a world record, and was allowed to join.

== Films ==
Many of the pilots hired by Howard Hughes to fly in his film Hell's Angels were later members of AAMP, and were well compensated.

Aerial scenes in The Eagle and the Hawk were filmed in 1933 under AMPP auspices. Parachute Jumper, also filmed in 1933, used AMPP fliers.

Men With Wings in 1938 employed several AMPP pilots led by Mantz who not only flew stunts but served as director of aerial photography.
