= Bride of the Storm =

1926 film

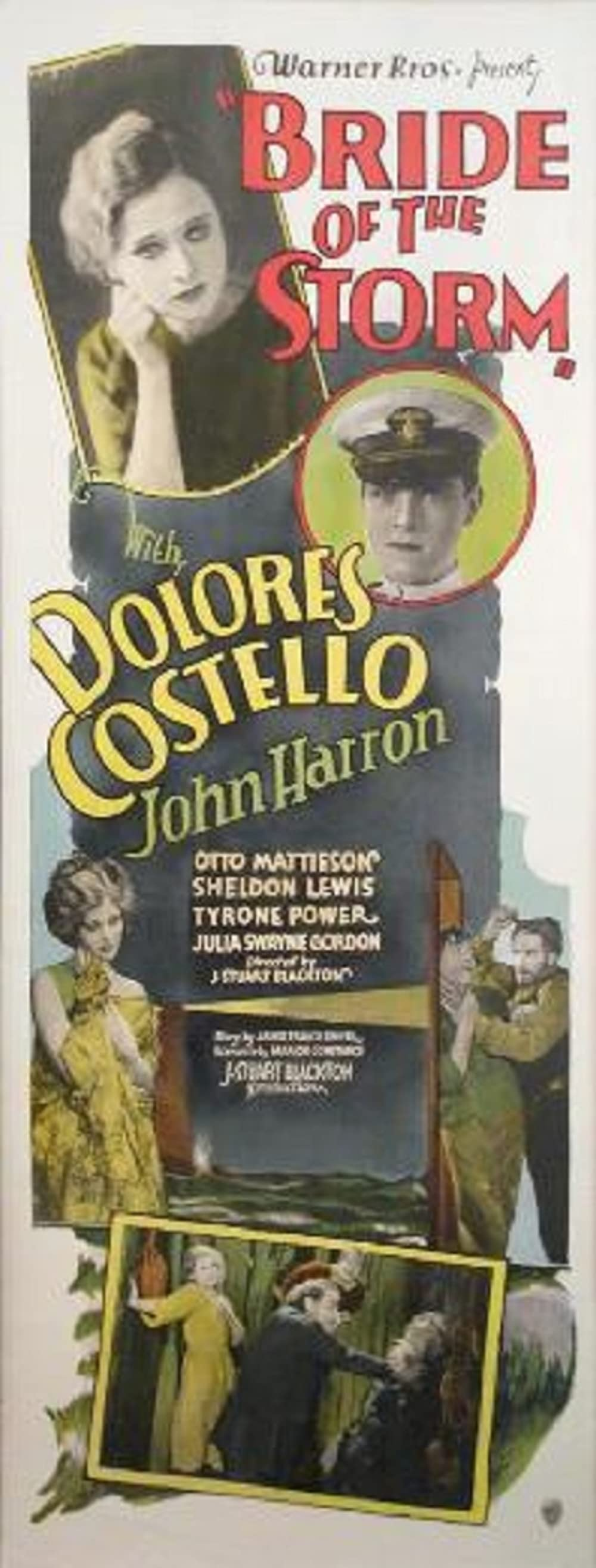
- Directed by: J. Stuart Blackton; Al Zeidman (2nd unit)
- Written by: Marian Constance Blackton (scenario)
- Based on: "Maryland, My Maryland" by James Francis Dwyer
- Produced by: J. Stuart Blackton (for Vitagraph)
- Starring: Dolores Costello; Tyrone Power Sr.
- Cinematography: William S. Adams; Nicholas Musuraca
- Distributed by: Warner Bros.
- Release date: February 20, 1926
- Running time: 7 reels (2080.56 m)
- Country: United States
- Language: Silent (English intertitles)

Bride of the Storm is a 1926 American silent adventure film directed by J. Stuart Blackton at Warner Bros. and starring Tyrone Power Sr. and Dolores Costello. Sheldon Lewis plays Tyrone Power's son in this picture even though, in real life, Lewis was a year older than Power.

== Plot ==
As described in a film magazine review, saved with her mother from the wreck of an American ship off the Dutch East Indies, Faith Fitzhugh is left to the mercy of three villainous keepers of a Dutch lighthouse, grandfather, father, and son. After her mother dies, the now orphan Faith is raised by the lighthouse keepers. Greedy for her wealth, Piet and Jacob, the two elder keepers, plan to marry her off to Hans, the idiot son. Dick Wayne, an officer of the crew of an American ship repairing cable off the lighthouse, who previously had seen the young woman, comes to her rescue just prior to the marriage and saves her after a terrific battle with the trio and a fire and falling of the lighthouse.

== Cast ==
- Dolores Costello as Faith Fitzhugh
- John Harron as Dick Wayne
- Otto Matieson as Hans Kroon
- Sheldon Lewis as Piet Kroon
- Tyrone Power Sr. as Jacob Kroon
- Julia Swayne Gordon as Faith's Mother
- Yvonne Pelletier as Faith (age 8)
- Ira McFadden as Heine Krutz
- Tudor Owen as Funeral Harry
- Fred Scott as Spike Mulligan
- Donald Stuart as Angus McLain
- Walter Tennyson as Ensign Clinton
- Larry Steers as Commander, U.S.S. Baltimore

== Preservation ==
With no prints of Bride of the Storm located in any film archives, it is a lost film.
