= James Francis Dwyer =

Australian writer

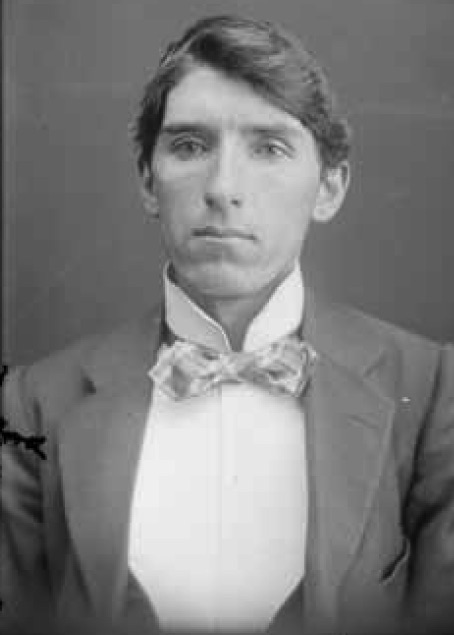
- Mugshot of James Dwyer taken in 1899
- Born: 22 April 1874; Camden Park, NSW
- Died: 11 November 1952 (aged 78); Pau, Pyrénées-Atlantiques
- Occupation: Writer
- Spouse(s): Selina Cassandra Stewart (1893–1919); Catherine Galbraith Welch (1919–1952)
- Writing career
- Pen name: Burglar Bill, J.F.D., D, Marat
- Genres: Mystery, adventure, romance

James Francis Dwyer (22 April 1874 – 11 November 1952) was an Australian writer. Born in Camden Park, New South Wales, Dwyer worked as a postal assistant until he was convicted in a scheme to make fraudulent postal orders and sentenced to seven years imprisonment in 1899. In prison, Dwyer began writing, and with the help of another inmate and a prison guard, had his work published in The Bulletin. After completing his sentence, he relocated to London and then New York, where he established a successful career as a writer of short stories and novels. Dwyer later moved to France, where he wrote his autobiography, Leg-Irons on Wings, in 1949. Dwyer wrote over 1,000 short stories during his career, and was the first Australian-born person to become a millionaire from writing.

== Early life ==
Born in Camden Park, New South Wales, Dwyer was the fifth son of farm labourer Michael Dwyer and Margaret Dwyer (née Mahoney), who were both from Mitchelstown, Ireland. They would eventually have eleven children, eight boys and three girls. Dwyer regarded his childhood as a happy one. In 1883, his family moved to Menangle, and in 1884 they moved again to Campbelltown. Dwyer attended public schools until he was 14, when he was sent to Sydney to live with relatives. He initially gained employment as a publisher's clerk for The Evening News, before becoming a mail carrier in Rockdale in 1892 and a postal assistant on Oxford Street in 1895. Dwyer had a brief meeting with Robert Louis Stevenson, which gave him ideas about becoming a writer himself; Dwyer noticed Stevenson while making a delivery for his clerk job, and followed him in fascination. Stevenson, noticing he was being followed, confronted Dwyer in a friendly manner and asked him his name. After being told his name was Jim, Stevenson encouraged him to be a good person like his namesake Jim Hawkins. Dwyer married Selina Cassandra Stewart on 7 November 1893. They had a son and a daughter.

== Arrest and imprisonment ==
Dwyer, with aspirations of travel and adventure, went to Melbourne with his friend Joseph Miller, a boilermaker, intending to make money taking bets on the Caulfield Cup. He ended up £30 pounds in debt, and desperately in need of money to pay his creditors. He proposed a scheme to Miller, though Miller confided the plan to a friend who then informed the police. In April 1899, police apprehended Miller, and found 22 fraudulent postal orders for £10 in his pockets. Miller confessed, saying that Dwyer was the mastermind of a scheme to make 65 fraudulent orders and cash them at suburban post offices. Miller also recruited printer Frederick Peter Craig to print the postal orders. Dwyer told police that Miller was lying and was trying to set him up, though the evidence against Dwyer was strong. His handwriting was matched to that on the postal notes and envelopes, and he had previously warned his superiors about the possibility of such a scheme in an attempt to impress them.

The trial of the three men was overseen by Chief Justice Frederick Matthew Darley, who informed the jury he thought Dwyer was obviously guilty before they began deliberating. In his autobiography, Dwyer said he could not blame Darley for doing so, as he thought his guilt was obvious as well; during the trial Dwyer advised his lawyer he wished to change his plea to guilty though his lawyer advised him not to, saying he would be acquitted. The jury found all three guilty; Dwyer was convicted of forgery and uttering on 16 June 1899. Craig and Miller were given one and two years hard labour respectively. Dwyer was given a seven year sentence. The sentence was extremely harsh for a first offence; by comparison, it was longer than the average sentence for manslaughter at the time. His lawyer protested the sentence as too severe, though Darley said it would act as a deterrent to others. Dwyer was sent to Goulburn Gaol. Along with four other prisoners he was taken through a crowded public train station in chains, where they were followed by a group of curious onlookers, before boarding a reserved carriage on a train to Goulburn. Dwyer described the event as an unforgettable humiliation; a young woman on the platform came to the defense of Dwyer and the others, angrily protesting to the prison guards that they should have brought them around the back of the station to save them from embarrassment.

As his sentence was longer than three years, he was automatically considered a dangerous prisoner, and accordingly was required to spend the first nine months of his sentence in solitary confinement. After finishing his period of solitary confinement, Dwyer obtained a job cataloguing books in the prison library. There he developed a passion for reading and also a desire to become a writer himself. Dwyer did not have access to paper or pencils while in prison, though he did have a writing slate on which he would write poems and short stories. A friend whose sentence was nearly completed committed one of Dwyer's poems, The Boot of Fate, to memory, and said he would send it to The Bulletin upon his release. Dwyer only learned the poem had been printed when one of the prison guards, who had seen the poem in the magazine, asked if he had in fact written it. Dwyer befriended the guard who, against regulations, helped him write by giving him paper and pencils. By his third year in prison, the guard had sent four short stories and another poem to The Bulletin on Dwyer's behalf. The poem, entitled The Trekkers, was printed, but the magazine's editor, J. F. Archibald, chose not to print the short stories on the fear there would be repercussions for Dwyer from prison management.

== Release and parole ==
And the ordinary gaol doctor! Well I have seen him get through 15 patients in 2½ minutes! He generally prides himself on his smartness in not letting a prisoner 'bluff' him, and doesn't take much pains to discriminate between a 'malingerer' and a really sick man.

— Dwyer writing in The Bulletin in August 1902, under the Burglar Bill pseudonym

A petition for Dwyer's release was approved by the Minister for Justice Bernhard Wise, and he was released in 1902 after serving three years of his sentence. Two of his short stories were published in The Bulletin on the day of his release on parole.

After his release, Dwyer worked various jobs including sales, buying pigeons for pigeon-shooting, and sign-writing. Dwyer found it difficult to obtain employment, as he could provide no references for the last several years of his life. One day when walking along William Street, Dwyer ran into Chief Justice Darley, who recognised him. The two struck up a friendly conversation, during which Dwyer informed Darley of his difficulties finding employment and reintegrating back into society and also of his wishes to become a writer. Darley was sympathetic, and wrote him a letter of introduction to the editor of The Sydney Morning Herald, recommending him for employment. Despite this, the editor told Dwyer no positions were available. Disheartened, that same afternoon Dwyer partook in unlicensed gambling outside a race track, and lost the last threepence he had for the week. Nevertheless, the excitement from this new experience prompted him to write a short story about street gambling, which he submitted to the Sydney Sportsman. The newspaper's owner, John Norton, subsequently offered him a steady job writing features for both the Sydney Sportsman and Truth. He also obtained work writing for The Bulletin. During his career as a journalist, Dwyer used the pen names Burglar Bill, J.F.D., D, and Marat; the Burglar Bill pseudonym was reserved for writing about prison related matters.

== Career and travels ==
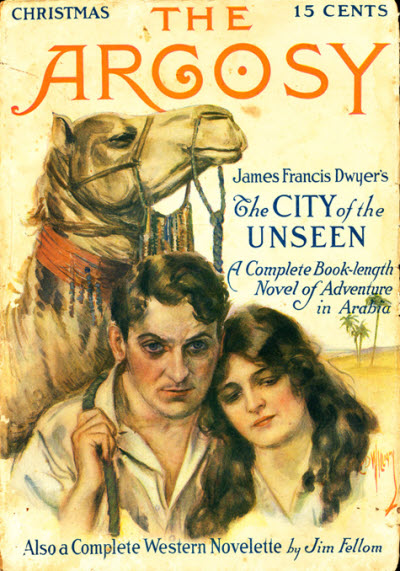
Dwyer's The City of the Unseen was published in Argosy in 1913

After his parole period was completed, Dwyer relocated to London in 1906, saying that "the Australian writer has no real chance in his own land", and going against advice given to him by Rudyard Kipling; Dwyer had written to Kipling a few years prior, enclosing some written verses and mentioned he was thinking about coming to London. In a long-handwritten reply, Kipling discouraged such a move, appearing to be unimpressed with his writing. Dwyer moved to London with his wife, though he found little success there as a writer. He relocated to New York City the following year, where he worked various jobs including as a streetcar conductor. His wife and daughter joined him there several months later.

Dwyer continued to try selling stories in New York. After winning a contest, he was given a commission to write for Black Cat. From there his stories were also published in Harper's Bazaar, Collier's, Blue Book and Argosy. As was common at the time, Dwyer often sold the rights to his short stories to the editors who printed them. He sold one to Frank Munsey for $30, which went on to be adapted into the 1914 film The Kaffir's Skull, directed by John G. Adolfi. The first of his novels, The White Waterfall, was published in 1912. It was an adventure story set in Australia. His 1913 novel, The Spotted Panther, received praise from The New York Times, who compared his style to H. Rider Haggard and said it was "written in a clear, spirited style, with the knack of narrative which makes all things seem possible". Dwyer travelled the US and Europe to gather information for the settings of his stories, and also visited Australia again in 1913. His short story The Citizen was included in The Best Short Stories of 1915, a book compiled by Edward Joseph Harrington O'Brien. O'Brien selected it and 19 other short stories for the book out of over 2,200 submissions. In 1915, Dwyer published Breath of the Jungle. It was the only collection of short stories that Dwyer published in book form. Most of the stories within it were set in the East Indies.

In December 1919, Dwyer divorced his wife and married his American agent, Catherine Welch. In 1921, Dwyer and Welch formed the business Dwyer Travel Letters, which offered prospective tourists information about Europe. That same year, an issue of Short Stories published his full-length novel Pomegranates of Gold to critical acclaim. The 1926 film, Bride of the Storm, is based on his short story "Maryland, My Maryland". Dwyer and Welch settled in Pau, France, though they frequently traveled through Europe, Asia, and North Africa. In 1934 they traveled through the Near East, and in 1935 they went to Timbuktu and French Congo. Dwyer wrote several anti-Nazi articles for French newspapers. One day he received a letter in the mail telling him his neck would be broken when the Germans reached Pau. After the Battle of France in 1940, Dwyer and his wife fled to Dover, New Hampshire via Spain, though they returned to Pau in September 1945. In 1949, Dwyer published his autobiography, Leg-Irons on Wings. He had concealed his criminal past for most of his life, though his autobiography described his crime and prison experience in detail. He died in Pau in 1952.

== Legacy ==
Dwyer's novels were mostly within the genres of mystery, adventure, thrillers and romance. According to The Encyclopedia of Science Fiction, some of his works will be of interest to science fiction fans, such as the 1913 lost race novel The City of the Unseen, which was published in an edition of Argosy. Dwyer is mentioned in Encyclopædia Britannica Twelfth Edition as one of several successful writers who were influenced in some way by J. F. Archibald. He was considered to be among the most successful writers of the 1920s to have immigrated from English speaking countries to the US. Dwyer wrote over 1,000 short stories during his career. According to a 1940 book on Australian literature by E. Morris Miller, Dwyer was "perhaps the most prolific short story writer" from Australia, though his work reached a much wider audience internationally than in his homeland. His obituary in the Australian literary magazine Southerly said that Dwyer had been "virtually unknown in Australia until the publication of his autobiography". Dwyer was the first Australian-born person to become a millionaire from writing. While he had been very successful during his lifetime, his work had been largely forgotten by the end of the 20th century.

== Publications ==
Dwyer published at least 11 fiction books throughout his career, plus his 1949 autobiography.

- The White Waterfall (1912)
- The Spotted Panther (1913)
- Breath of the Jungle (1915)
- The Green Half-Moon (1917)
- O Splendid Sorcery (1930)
- Evelyn: Something More Than a Story (1931)
- The Romantic Quest of Peter Lamonte (1932)
- Cold Eyes (1933)
- Hespamora (1935)
- The Lady With Feet of Gold (1937)
- The City of Cobras (1938)
- Leg-Irons on Wings (1949)
