= Love's Whirlpool (1924 film) =

1924 film

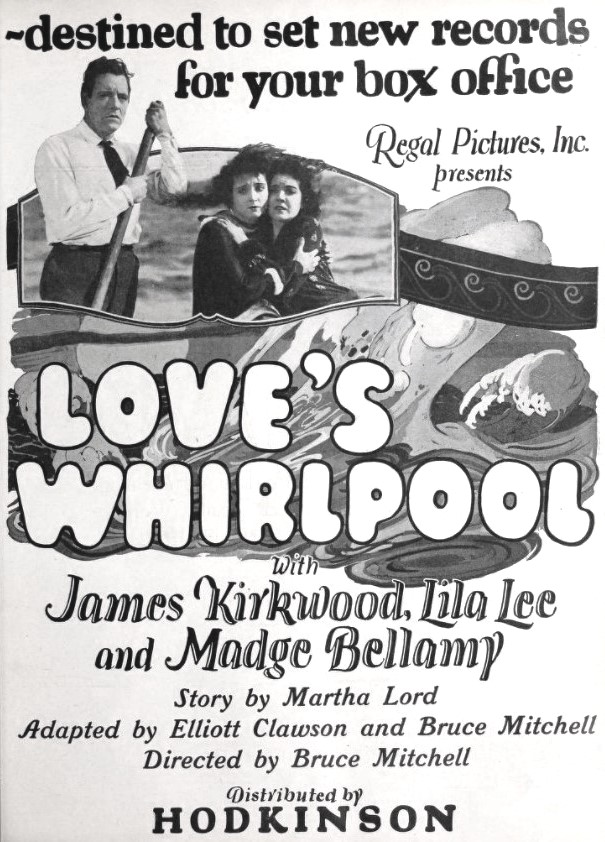
- Advertisement
- Directed by: Bruce M. Mitchell
- Screenplay by: Martha Lord
- Produced by: Regal Pictures
- Starring: James Kirkwood; Lila Lee
- Cinematography: Stephen Norton
- Edited by: Jack Dennis
- Distributed by: W. W. Hodkinson Corporation
- Release date: March 2, 1924
- Running time: 60 minutes
- Country: United States
- Language: Silent (English intertitles)

Love's Whirlpool is a 1924 American silent crime drama film directed by Bruce M. Mitchell and starring James Kirkwood and Lila Lee.

== Plot ==
Hardened criminal Jim Reagan tries to persuade his adolescent brother, Larry, to abandon their life of crime. Rather than heeding Jim's warning, Larry arrested when he tries to rob a banker named Richard Milton. Milton refuses Jim's request for leniency and Larry is thrown in jail. Jim attempts to help his brother escape prison, but the boy is fatally wounded in the process. Jim and his girlfriend, Molly, resolve to have vengeance.

Jim and Molly kidnap Milton's daughter, Nadine, after rescuing her from a shipwreck. Conveniently suffering from amnesia, Nadine becomes the unwitting foil in the plot against her father. They then open a clairvoyant parlor and tell Milton, who believes Nadine is dead, they can help him contact his daughter's spirit. Milton's initially cynicism is banished when the figure of his daughter appears and speaks to him during a seance. Through the influence of Nadine's "spirit," the mourning father is induced to spend a huge amount of money on charity. Jim and Molly plan to milk Milton for all he's worth before giving him back his daughter—dead.

During one of the many seances, Molly is touched by an unknown and mysterious power. Molly's conscience is awakened by the experience and she returns Nadine to her father. Nadine's memory returns upon seeing Milton, and the banker forgives everything.

Meanwhile, police raid Jim's headquarters. Jim escapes via a daredevil route over several buildings, and returns home to kill Molly for betraying him. Suddenly, he is overwhelmed by the memory of his laughing young brother. When Molly returns, Jim cannot kill her. Their mutual devotion to the dead boy and their love of each other is revived by Larry's memory, and Molly and Jim return to a life of good citizenship.

== Cast ==
- James Kirkwood as Jim Reagan
- Lila Lee as Molly
- Robert Agnew as Larry
- Matthew Betz as Pinky Sellers
- Edward Martindel as Richard Milton
- Margaret Livingston as A Maid
- Madge Bellamy as Nadine Milton
- Clarence Geldart as A Lawyer
- Joseph Mills as 'Parson' Monks

== Production ==
Publicity for Love's Whirlpool claimed that the film was based on a novel by Martha Lord entitled The Inner Sight, but there is no evidence that such a book was ever published. Director Bruce Mitchell co-wrote the adaptation for Love's Whirlpool with Elliott Clawson.

The film's producers advertised the film as a combination crook melodrama, romance, and treatise on the spirit world. To capitalize on society's wider interest in spiritualism after World War I, W.W. Hodkinson Distribution offer the following advice to theater managers:

Drape a booth in black and set it in your lobby. Just outside have a man with long whiskers, a turban and clothing worn by fortunetellers and "readers" of various kinds. Over the booth have a sign "Gaze into the crystal ball and see yourself as your really are." Inside the booth have an ordinary looking glass. Let the crowds go in and get a look for themselves. When one person sees it is only a trick, he will spread the word around and soon people will be coming to learn about spirits—and of course when they are once in your lobby, they will visit the box office and go in to see the picture.

Love's Whirlpool was also the first film starring James Kirkwood and Lila Lee since their marriage in 1923.

== Reception ==
The film released in March 1924 to mixed reviews. The reviewer for the New York Times called Love's Whirlpool "a bad picture which is interesting" and was amused by the director's willingness to abandon any sense of realism:

He [Bruce Mitchell] nonchalantly places his puppets where it meets his convenience, regardless whether the incident or situation is plausible. Through the film he seems to thunder: "There they are on the beach with the girl who was drowning. The camera does not lie! What have you got to say about it?" It was marvelous that a girl could be for any length of time in the water and then turn up in the same gown, around which are three rows of fur, as if it had . . . just come straight from the dressmaker's."

Sidne Silverman (writing under the pseudonym "Skig") of Variety thought the film would find an audience, but was critical of Mitchell's direction—particularly in the use of yet another rooftop chase. "Why directors insist on making fugitives silhouette themselves against a skyline," he wrote, "might constitute a particular point the boys with the megaphones should look into for a change. It's been going on for years and years."

Harrison's Report thought the film was fast-paced, suspenseful, and well-acted, but thought the ending was overly sentimental. Aileen St. John-Brenon of The New York Telegraph thought the hackneyed and melodramatic film was redeemed only by "several ingenious twists." Brenon also thought the film was a poor vehicle for Kirkwood and Lee's obvious onscreen chemistry, while panning Madge Bellamy's portrayal of Nadine.

== Preservation ==
A complete print of Love's Whirlpool is located in the BFI National Archive.
