= Sky Bride =

1932 film

- Film poster
- Directed by: Stephen Roberts
- Written by: Joseph L. Mankiewicz (screenplay); Agnes Brand Leahy (screenplay); Grover Jones
- Based on: story by Waldemar Young
- Produced by: Joseph L. Mankiewicz
- Starring: Richard Arlen; Jack Oakie; Virginia Bruce
- Cinematography: David Abel; Charles A. Marshall
- Music by: John Leipold
- Production company: Paramount Publix Corporation
- Distributed by: Paramount Pictures
- Release date: March 20, 1932
- Running time: 78 minutes
- Country: United States
- Language: English

Sky Bride (also known as Sky Brides) is a 78-minute 1932 drama film, produced by Paramount Pictures and directed by Stephen Roberts. (Note: The screenplay was written by a team of writers that included Joseph L. Mankiewicz, who became famous not only as a screenwriter, but also as a film director and producer.) The film stars Richard Arlen, Jack Oakie and Virginia Bruce. Sky Bride depicts the life of barnstorming pilots flying in the years following World War I. All over North America, skilled pilots, many of them veterans of the aerial combat of World War I, plied their trade on the barnstorming circuit of the 1920s in small towns where impromptu air shows were staged.

== Plot ==
Bert "Speed" Condon is the star of the "Speed Condon Flying Circus". The troupe of barnstorming pilots includes "Wild Bill" Adams, Eddie Smith and their manager, Alec "Ma" Dugan. Performing in small towns across the country, Speed and his friends are known for their stunt flying as much as giving "joy rides" for paying customers. Speed and Eddie try a dangerous mock "dog fight" that ends with Eddie's death.

A remorseful Speed quits flying and heads to Los Angeles on foot, finding work as a mechanic at the Beck Aircraft Company. The company secretary, Ruth Dunning, is convinced that the new mechanic is hiding a secret. A budding romance is stymied by her suitor, pilot Jim Carmichael. His former manager, determined to find Speed, wants him to rejoin the barnstorming group. When he locates Speed, Alec finds that he is still working in aviation and is living at the local boardinghouse run by Eddie's mother, who is unaware that Speed caused her son's death.

Eddie's nephew Willie is crazy about flying and wants to become a parachute jumper like others who perform at air shows. When Willie becomes accidentally trapped in the landing gear of an aircraft flown by Jim Carmichael, Speed realizes that he has to go up in another aircraft and free the young boy. After completing the daring aerial rescue, Speed finally is able to deal with his grief and guilt, and reveals to Mrs. Smith what happened to her son. Speed then asks Ruth out on a date for the dance that night, while Alec has to come to Willie's rescue when the young daredevil parachutes from the boardinghouse roof.

== Cast ==
- Richard Arlen as Bert "Speed" Condon
- Jack Oakie as Alec Dugan
- Virginia Bruce as Ruth Dunning
- Robert Coogan as Willie Smith
- Tom Douglas as Eddie Smith
- Louise Closser Hale as Mrs. (Ma) Smith
- Harold Goodwin as "Wild Bill" Adams
- Charles Starrett as Jim Carmichael
- Randolph Scott as Captain Frank Robertson (Note: Frances Dee appears in an uncredited role.)

== Production ==
Principal photography for Sky Bride began February 1932 at the Metropolitan Airport and Chatsworth, Los Angeles studios in the San Fernando Valley of California.

Essential to filming the story was a seven-pilot team of Associated Motion Picture Pilots led by Leo Nomis, and later Frank Clarke. On February 5, 1932, the production was halted when lead pilot Nomis was killed while performing a stunt. He had been seriously injured weeks earlier in a race track accident while driving as a stunt double in The Crowd Roars (1932). Although not fully recovered from his injuries, Nomis tried to perform a difficult spin and landing over railway tracks. Although he completed the stunt twice, a fiery exchange with the director, who demanded a perfect stunt, with the aircraft rolling to a stop directly in front of the cameras, forced the normally imperturbable Nomis to try the stunt a third time. The fatal crash was most probably caused by his inability to fly in complete control, partly because of his injuries and partly because he was upset at his treatment by the director.

== Reception ==
Sky Bride was primarily a B film, and although aerial scenes were notable, fell short in other aspects. The New York Times review said the film, "... falls short of being good entertainment. It is too argumentative, and several of the flying scenes are unnecessarily lengthy."
