= Al Wilson (pilot) =

American film actor, producer, and stunt pilot (1895–1932)

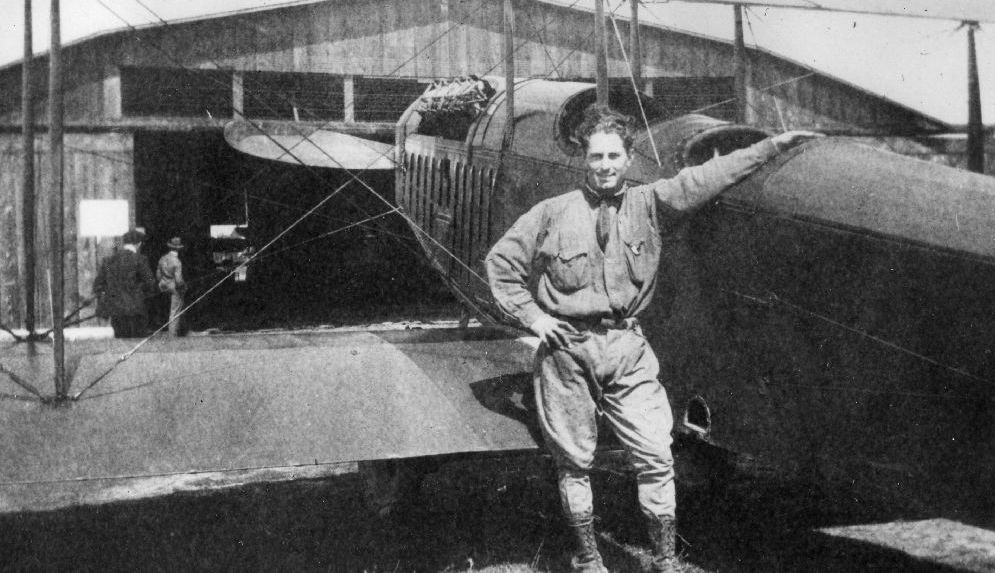
- Al Wilson, in front of his Curtiss JN-4 c. 1920
- Born: Albert Peter Wilson; December 1, 1895; Harrodsburg, Kentucky, US
- Died: September 5, 1932 (aged 36); Cleveland, Ohio, US
- Occupations: Actor; producer; stunt pilot

Albert Peter Wilson (December 1, 1895 – September 5, 1932) was an American film actor, producer and stunt pilot. Wilson died in Cleveland, Ohio, in an air crash while doing flying stunts at the 1932 Cleveland Air Races show.

== Biography ==
Born in Harrodsburg, Kentucky, Wilson grew up in Southern California, where his family had moved, and since he was young he has always been passionate about flying. He started at Schiller Aviation School as a maintenance assistant, where he also began to study as a pilot. After that, he taught in flying schools and finally he became chief instructor at the American Aircraft Company. After a short period as manager of Mercury Aviation Company, founded by one of his students, Cecil B. DeMille, Wilson became more and more skilled in performing stunts, including wing-walking, and left the company to become a professional stunt pilot.

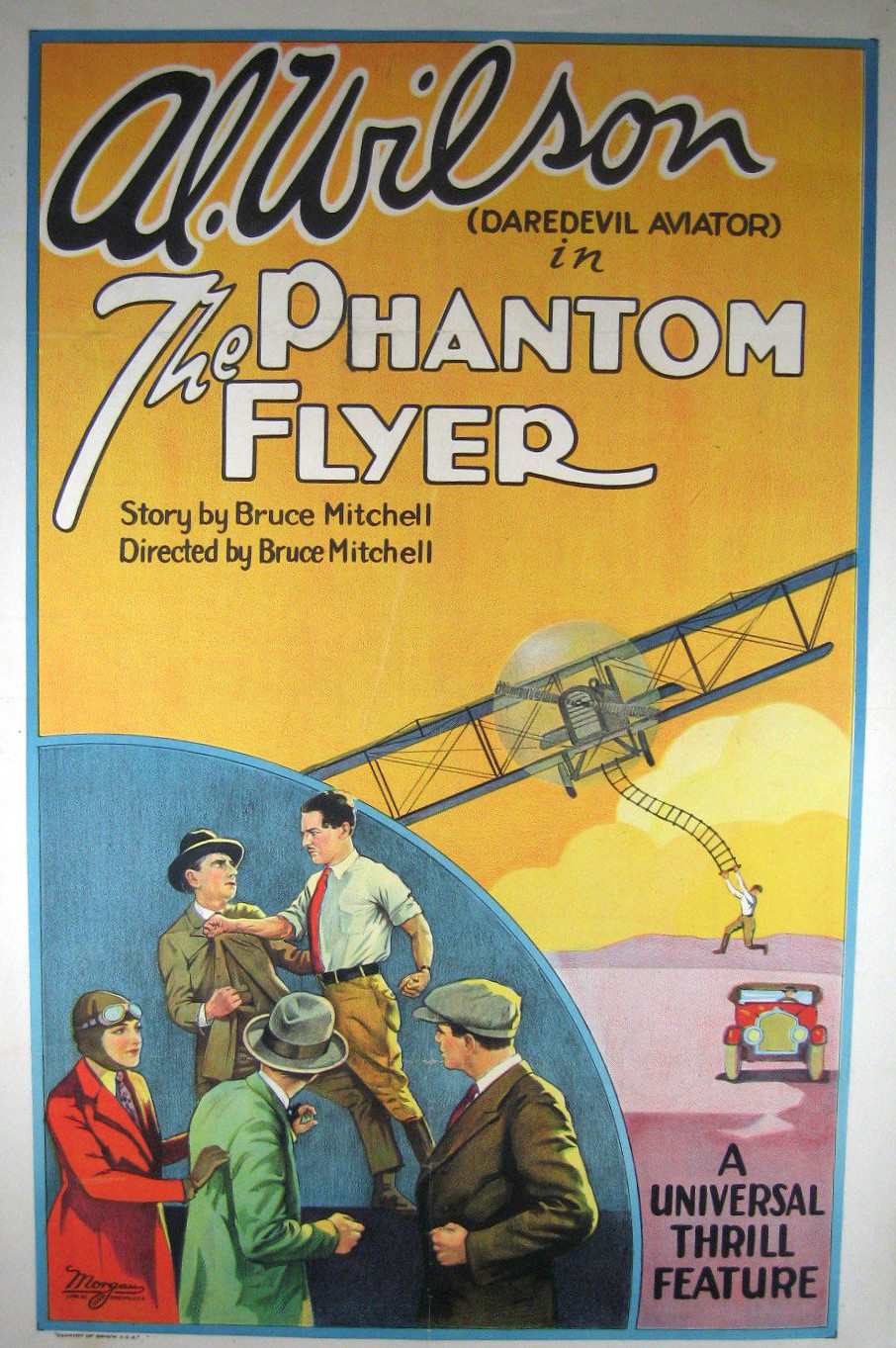
poster for The Phantom Flyer

Wilson worked together with stuntmen like Frank Clarke and Wally Timm and also for movie companies, including Universal. After numerous appearances in stunt roles he started his actor career in 1923 with the serial The Eagle's Talons. He produced his own movies until 1927, when he went back to work with Universal. Wilson was also one of the pilots in Hell's Angels (1930) and during filming, he was involved in an accident where the mechanic Phil Jones died. This episode marked the end of his career as stunt pilot in movies.

During the National Air Races in Cleveland in 1932, his aircraft crashed and he died a few days later in hospital due to the injuries he suffered. The accident is documented in the film Pylon Dusters: 1932 and 1938 Air Races, an historic film about the 1932 Cleveland Race.

== Filmography ==
- The Eagle's Talons (1923, serial)
- The Ghost City (1923, serial)
- The Air Hawk (1924)
- The Cloud Rider (1925)
- The Fighting Ranger (1925, serial)
- Flyin' Thru (1925)
- The Flying Mail (1926)
- Three Miles Up (1927)
- Sky High Saunders (1927)
- The Air Patrol (1928)
- The Cloud Dodger (1928)
- The Phantom Flyer (1928)
- Won in the Clouds (1928)
- The Sky Skidder (1929)
- Hell's Angels (1930)
- The Airmail Mystery (1932)
