= Bruce M. Mitchell =

American film director

Bruce M. Mitchell (November 16, 1883 – September 26, 1952) was an American film director and writer active during the silent film era from 1914 to 1934. With the advent of sound films in the 1930s, Mitchell abandoned directing and became an actor, appearing mainly in bit roles.

== Filmography ==
Mitchell directed numerous silent short films between 1915 and 1934. The following is a list of his feature films.

- Captivating Mary Carstairs (1915)
- The Tale of the Night Before (1915)
- The Stranger of the Hills (1922)
- Love's Whirlpool (1924)
- The Hellion (1924)
- Another Man's Wife (1924)
- Dynamite Dan (1924)
- The Air Hawk (1924)
- The Cloud Rider (1925)
- Savages of the Sea (1925)
- Speed Madness (1925)
- Tricks (1925)
- Flyin' Thru (1925)
- Wolf Blood (1925)
- The Hollywood Reporter (1926)
- Three Pals (1926)
- Cupid's Knockout (1926)
- Three Miles Up (1927)
- The Air Patrol (1928)
- The Phantom Flyer (1928)
- Won in the Clouds (1928)
- The Speed Classic (1928)
- The Cloud Dodger (1928)
- The Last Lap (1928)
- The Sky Skidder (1929)
- Below the Border (1929)
- The Lonesome Trail (1930)
- Sheer Luck (1931)
- Trapped (1931)
- 45 Calibre Echo (1932)
- The Rawhide Terror (1934)
- Half Angel (1936)
- Shakedown (1936)
