= William S. Adams =

American cinematographer (1892–1930)

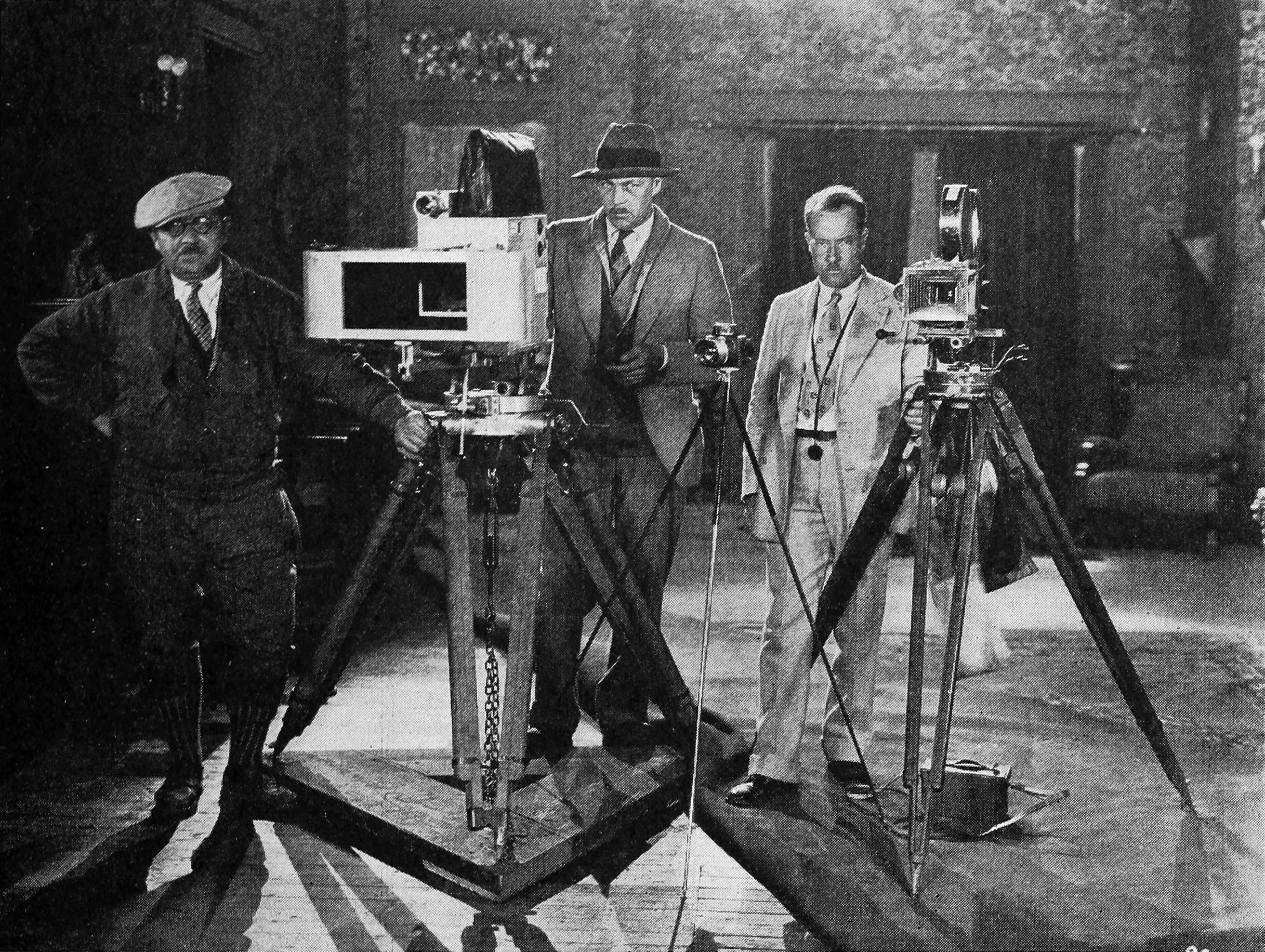
- Born: June 2, 1892; New York, New York, United States
- Died: December 3, 1930 (aged 38); Hollywood, California, United States
- Occupation: Cinematographer
- Years active: 1913–1929 (film)

William S. Adams (1892–1930) was an American cinematographer of the silent era. He was the younger half-brother of J. Stuart Blackton, the British born film pioneer and co-founder of Vitagraph Studios. Adams worked with Blackton several times, but was also employed by other companies. He developed a reputation as a specialist in aerial photography, but his career was cut short when he died of a tropical disease at the beginning of the sound era.

== Filmography ==
| Year | Title | Notes |
|---|---|---|
| 1915 | The Juggernaut | |
| 1920 | My Husband's Other Wife | |
| 1920 | The Blood Barrier | |
| 1920 | Man and His Woman | |
| 1920 | Passers By | |
| 1920 | Respectable by Proxy | |
| 1920 | The Forbidden Valley | |
| 1920 | The House of the Tolling Bell | |
| 1921 | East Lynne | |
| 1921 | The Wakefield Case | |
| 1922 | Destiny's Isle | |
| 1925 | Tides of Passion | |
| 1925 | Tricks | |
| 1926 | Bride of the Storm | |
| 1927 | Bride of the Storm | |
| 1927 | Sky High Saunders | |
| 1927 | The American | |
| 1928 | Won in the Clouds | |
| 1928 | The Air Patrol | |
| 1928 | The Cloud Dodger | |
| 1928 | The Phantom Flyer | |
| 1929 | Grit Wins | |
| 1929 | The Smiling Terror | |
| 1929 | Born to the Saddle | |
| 1929 | The Sky Skidder | |

== Bibliography ==
- John T. Soister, Henry Nicolella, Steve Joyce. American Silent Horror, Science Fiction and Fantasy Feature Films, 1913-1929. McFarland, 2014.
