= Larry Steers =

American actor (1888–1951)

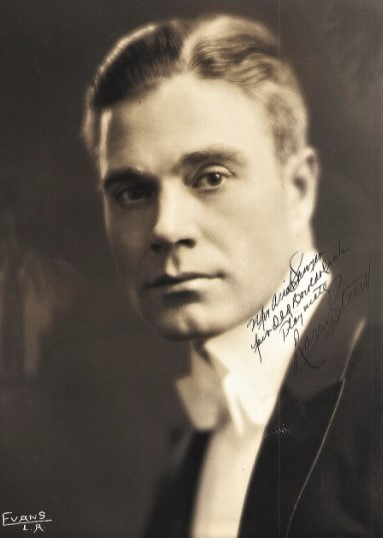
- Steers in 1920
- Born: February 14, 1888; Indiana, United States
- Died: February 15, 1951 (aged 63); Woodland Hills, Los Angeles, United States
- Occupation: Actor
- Years active: 1917–1951

Lawrence Wells Steers (February 14, 1888 – February 15, 1951) was an American film actor. He appeared in more than 550 films between 1917 and 1951. He was born in Indiana, and died in Woodland Hills, Los Angeles.

Steers was a bayonet instructor in World War I. After he was discharged, his friendship with Cecil B. DeMille enabled him to begin acting in films. His roles varied, including being a leading man, portraying heavies, and having character parts.

Toward the end of his career, Steers made the transition from character actor to extra. In 1934 he was one of the four extras who made the most money from that work. He was president of the Junior Screen Actors Guild before being defeated in a bid for re-election in 1938.

== Partial filmography ==
- Old Wives for New (1918)
- The City of Dim Faces (1918)
- A Pair of Silk Stockings (1918)
- Little Comrade (1919)
- Heartsease (1919)
- The Roaring Road (1919) (uncredited)
- The Right of Way (1920)
- Dollar for Dollar (1920)
- Wealth (1921)
- The Blot (1921) (uncredited)
- Elope If You Must (1922)
- Bell Boy 13 (1923) (uncredited)
- Mind Over Motor (1923)
- Soul of the Beast (1923)
- The Girl in the Limousine (1924)
- Ten Scars Make a Man (1924)
- A Cafe in Cairo (1924)
- Paint and Powder (1925)
- The Love Gamble (1925)
- Wild West (1925)
- New Brooms (1925)
- The Best People (1925)
- Flattery (1925)
- Lady Windermere's Fan (1925)
- Hearts and Spangles (1926)
- The Lodge in the Wilderness (1926)
- No Control (1927)
- The Phantom Flyer (1928)
- The Terrible People (1928)
- The Fire Detective (1929)
- In Old California (1929)
- Dark Skies (1929)
- The Wheel of Life (1929)
- The King of the Kongo (1929)
- The Thoroughbred (1930)
- The Secret Call (1931)
- The Road to Reno (1931)
- Possessed (1931)
- Night World (1932)
- Cocktail Hour (1933)
- Transatlantic Merry-Go-Round (1934)
- The Great Hotel Murder (1935)
- The Great Impersonation (1935)
- The Invisible Killer (1939)
- Wonder Man (1945)
- The Private Affairs of Bel Ami (1947)
