= Frank Clarke (pilot) =

Hollywood stunt pilot, actor, and military officer

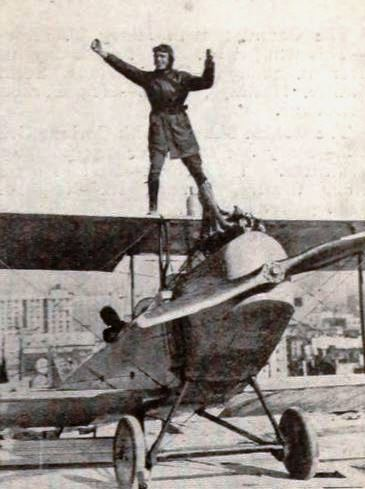
From a 1921 magazine noting a stunt for Stranger Than Fiction (1921)

Frank Clarke (29 December 1898 – 12 June 1948) was a Hollywood stunt pilot, actor, and military officer. His most prominent role was as Leutnant von Bruen (and double for von Richthofen in combat scenes) in the 1930 production Hell's Angels, but he flew for the camera and performed stunts in more than a dozen films in the 1930s and 1940s. Clarke was killed in an aircraft crash near Isabella, California, in 1948.

== Early life ==
Clarke was born near Paso Robles, California, on December 29, 1898. He came into prominence when he moved to Venice, California and learned to fly, purchasing a war surplus Curtiss JN-4. His first exploits were as a "stunt" pilot, with a risky mid-air transfer from one aircraft to another reported in local media on October 4, 1919. Clarke was positioned on the top wing of a Curtiss "Jenny" and after two misses, was able to catch the landing gear of the aircraft flown by fellow aviator Al Wilson. Newspapers heralded the feat as a "first" of its kind.

In his biography of pilot Paul Mantz, aviation author Don Dwiggins observed that the "Undisputed king of the Hollywood stunt pilots when Mantz arrived was Frank Clarke, a tall, handsome, part-Indian ex-cowboy who melted the hearts of women and froze the hearts of men. A 'born' pilot, Clarke was hopping passengers at Venice Field in 1918 on the same day he soloed. His good looks won him the lead role in the flying film serial Eagle of the Night (1928) at Pathé Studios."

== Hollywood ==
Clarke soon realized that Hollywood was eager to employ a group of pilots, who each would create elaborate aerial stunts. In a lengthy career, he was able to not only fly and "double" for other actors such as James Cagney, but also operate camera aircraft and act as a cinematographer. Clarke was a charter member, along with Pancho Barnes, of the Associated Motion Picture Pilots.

An off-and-on rivalry with Mantz, often culminated in either pilot getting a coveted job. Clarke began to extend his involvement in films by taking on more demanding assignments. "In addition, Clarke insisted on writing his own scripts, calling for such suicidal stunts as landing on top of a speeding passenger train. He came closer to disaster on this one, when a wheel stuck between two cars; it came free when the train rounded a curve."

Clarke's first film piloting job listed by IMDb is in The Cloud Rider, in 1925, but the Los Angeles Times published details of Clark (he added the last 'e' later) flying a Curtiss JN-4D "Jenny" on December 14, 1920, "accidentally" off the roof of the incomplete 10-story Railway Building in downtown Los Angeles. The stunt appeared in the silent film Stranger Than Fiction. His last was an uncredited appearance in RKO's Walk Softly, Stranger, filming of which was completed in June 1948 but which was not released by studio head Howard Hughes until 1950.

In between, Clarke was involved with such productions as The Air Patrol (1928), Eagle of the Night (1928), Hell's Angels (1930), The Lost Squadron (1932), Ace of Aces (1933), the 1935 serial Tailspin Tommy in the Great Air Mystery, Men with Wings (1938), and The Flying Deuces (1939).

== World War II ==
According to Los Angeles Times staff writer, Cecilia Rasmussen, her biography on Clarke, noted, "When World War II began, Clarke enlisted in the Air Force. He rose to the rank of major while teaching his seat-of-the-pants skills to young pilots."

Lt. Col. Paul Mantz, commanding officer of the First Motion Picture Unit, brought Maj. Frank Clarke into the unit to take charge of the Flight Echelon. Unfortunately, Clarke and Mantz had been bitter pre-war Hollywood rivals and Clarke resented being subordinate to Mantz in both position and rank. Clarke repaid his rival by framing him on charges of misconduct, and although Mantz was not found guilty of any infractions, the mere fact of the investigation led to Mantz being eased out of the commanding officer's slot in December 1943.

== Death ==
On June 13, 1948, Clarke was flying his Vultee BT-13 Valiant to Kernville, California, with a pilot friend, Mark Owens. They were on their way to visit a retired fellow-Hollywood flying buddy, Frank Tomick. Clarke decided it would be amusing to drop a bag of manure on Tomick's cabin. "Clarke pushed the throttle forward in what was to have been a dive-bombing run. Tomick watched in horror as the plane plunged straight down into the ground and exploded. The sack of fertilizer had jammed behind the control stick, locking it."

The San Bernardino Daily Sun reported on June 14, 1948, that sheriff's deputies "investigated the crash of a converted Army training plane in which two Hollywood movie studio workers were killed. The victims were identified as Frank Clark, [sic], stunt pilot, and Mark Owens, 51, both of Los Angeles."

In commemoration of Frank Clarke: "The propeller from Clarke's BT-13 is mounted in concrete in an area known as Dutch Flats, west of Lake Isabella in the Green Horn Mountains. Etched in the propeller are his name and (that of) Owens."
