= Glendale Municipal Airport =

Airport in Maricopa County, Arizona

Glendale Regional Airport
- IATA: none; ICAO: KGEU; FAA LID: GEU

Summary
- Airport type: Public
- Owner: City of Glendale
- Serves: Glendale, Arizona
- Elevation AMSL: 1,071 ft (326 m)
- Coordinates: 33°31′37″N 112°17′42″W

Map
- Location of airport in Arizona

Runways
Direction	Length		Surface
Direction	ft	m	Surface
1/19	7,150	2,179	Asphalt

Statistics (2008)
- Aircraft operations: 136,289
- Based aircraft: 220
- Source: Federal Aviation Administration

Glendale Regional Airport (ICAO: KGEU, FAA LID: GEU) is a city-owned, public-use airport located 7 miles (6.1 nmi; 11 km) west of the central business district of Glendale, a city in Maricopa County, Arizona, United States. It is included in the National Plan of Integrated Airport Systems for 2011–2015, which categorized it as a general aviation reliever airport.

Although most U.S. airports use the same three-letter location identifier for the FAA and IATA, this airport is assigned GEU by the FAA but has no designation from the IATA The airport's ICAO identifier is KGEU.

== Facilities and aircraft ==
Glendale Regional Airport covers an area of 514 acres (208 ha) at an elevation of 1,071 ft (326 m) above mean sea level. It has one runway:

- 1/19 measuring 7,150 ft × 100 ft (2,179 m × 30 m) asphalt

For the 12-month period ending December 31, 2008, the airport had 136,289 aircraft operations, an average of 373 per day: 98% general aviation, 1.% air taxi, and 1% military. At that time there were 220 aircraft based at this airport: 78% single-engine, 11% ultralight, 8% multi-engine, 2% jet, and 1% helicopter.

== See also ==
- List of airports in Arizona
