= Mercury Aviation Company =

Aviation company in California, United States

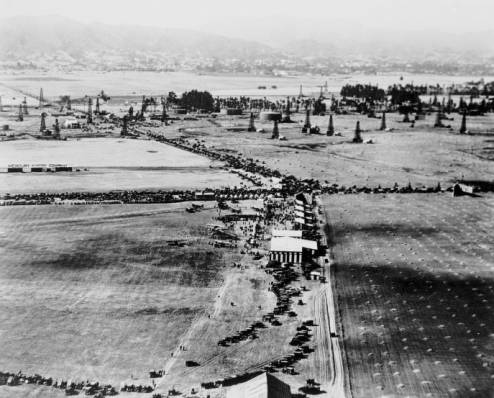
Aerial view, circa 1920, looking north along Fairfax Avenue at the intersection of Wilshire Boulevard. An aviation fair is underway at Chaplin Airfield in center, and DeMille Airfield No.2 is located in the upper left corner of the photo.

Mercury Aviation Company was one of the first commercial airline services founded in 1919 (107 years ago) by Cecil B. DeMille. DeMille, Hollywood American film director and producer, was one of the first to see the aircraft's potential in commercial airline service. At first Mercury Aviation flew World War I surplus Curtiss JN-4 Jenny for sightseeing and charter flights from DeMille Field No. 1 and then later purchased passenger planes. DeMille restored a World War I plane in 1917. Mercury Aviation Company did not make a profit and closed in 1922 (104 years ago) after two years of operation. Al Wilson was DeMille's flight instructor and became the manager of the company for a short time.

== Air Service ==
Mercury Aviation Company's Mercury Air Lines started regular scheduled flights in May 1921. Mercury Aviation Company offered flights to Santa Catalina Island, San Diego, and San Francisco. Other cities were added to the airline service. Mercury Aviation Company thus became the first airline service to offer flights to multiple destinations. Over 25,000 passengers were transported in the two years of Mercury Aviation Company operation. Mercury Aviation Company closed in 1922 with no crashes in its two years of operation.

== DeMille Field No. 1 ==
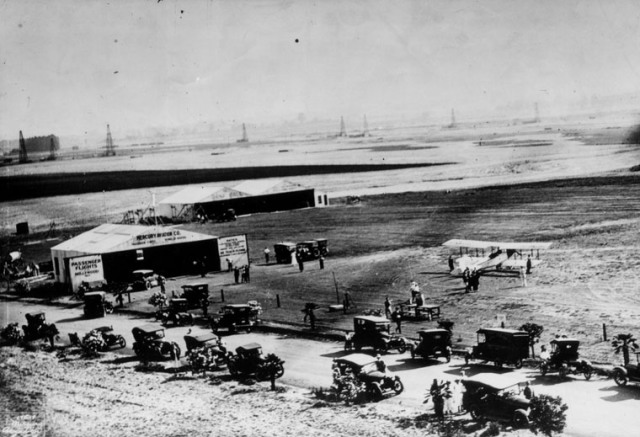
DeMille Field No. 1 in 1918

DeMille Field No. 1 built by Cecil B. DeMille in 1918, located at the southwest corner of Melrose Avenue and Fairfax Avenue, Fairfax was called Crescent Avenue in the 1920s. DeMille Field No. 1 was located at 34.081620°N 118.362414°W across the street from the current Fairfax High School. In 1920 he closed DeMille Field No. 1 and moved to DeMille Field No. 2. The DeMille Field No. 1 site is now houses in the Fairfax District, Los Angeles.

== DeMille Field No. 2 ==
DeMille Field No. 2 in 1920

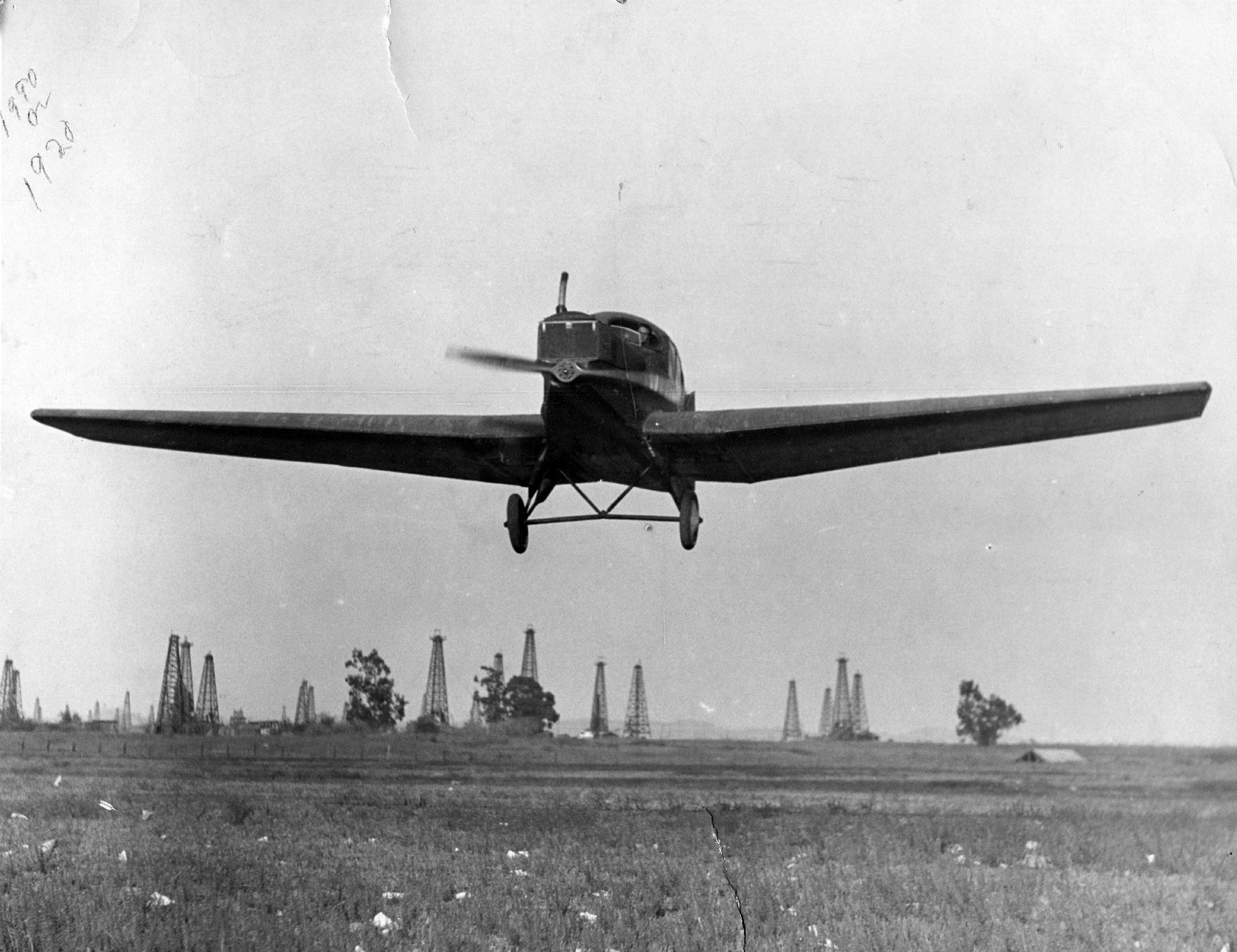
Junkers at Mercury Field in 1920

DeMille Field No. 2 also called Mercury Field was at the northwest corner of Lindenhurst Ave and Fairfax Avenue, Fairfax was called Crescent Avenue in the 1920s. It was just north of the Sydney Chaplin's Airport at 34.065743°N 118.361536°W. Cecil B. DeMille's Mercury Aviation Company purchased a Junkers-Larsen JL-6 aircraft in August 1920 and start his commercial airline. Eddie Rickenbacker, World War 1 ace delivered the new JL-6 to DeMille Field No. 2. Before operating the JL-6, Mercury Aviation flew World War I surplus Curtiss JN-4 Jenny for sightseeing, US Mail, cargo and charter flights.

Cecil B. DeMille used DeMille Field No. 2 for some of his silent picture films. In August 1920 two stunt pilots were killed at DeMille Field No. 2: Ormer "Lock" Locklear and Milton "Skeets" Elliott, in the making of The Skywayman. Mercury Aviation Company had a unique gas station at Fairfax and Wilshire. One side filled up cars the other side filled up aircraft. DeMille Field No. 2 was the site of the first passenger plane to land from New York City.

The airport closed in 1930, as Mercury was not profitable. The site is now housing in the Fairfax District.

== Eaton Altadena ==
Eaton Altadena Airport was built by Mercury Aviation Company in 1922 in Altadena, California located at 34.185694°N 118.121897°W at 1347 East Mendocino Street. The airport also served nearby Pasadena, California. Eaton Altadena had much less service than Field No. 2. The site is now the Altadena Town & Country Club.

== See also ==
- List of defunct airlines of the United States
- The Flying Mail
- The Air Patrol
- The Cloud Dodger
- Mercury Air Line Holdings, Florida
