= Wally Timm =

American aircraft engineer (1896–1978)

Wallace D. Timm
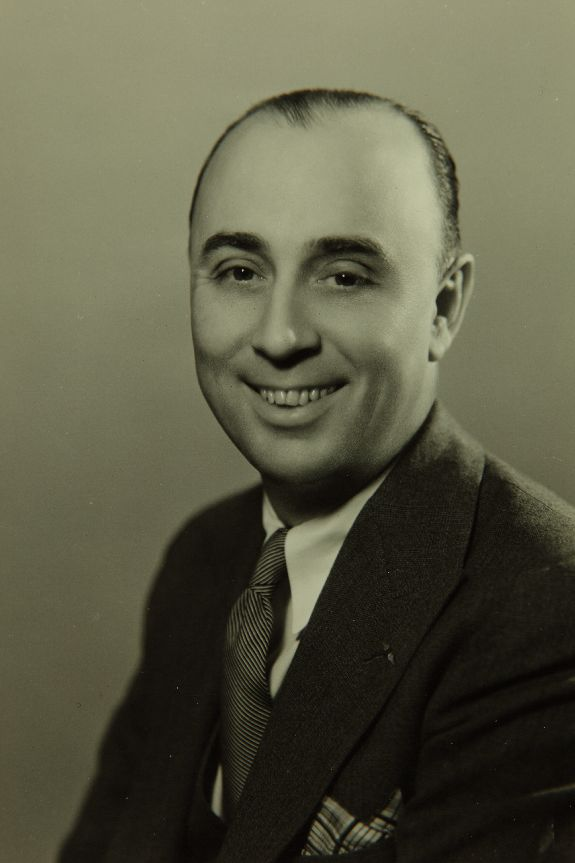
- Born: August 8, 1896 (also given as August 10, 1896); Lakefield, Minnesota
- Died: April 29, 1978 (aged 81); El Cajon, California
- Parent(s): Julius Timm and Alvine Hohenstein
- Relatives: Brother, Otto Timm, Reuben Timm

Wallace Daniel "Wally" Timm (August 8, 1896 – April 29, 1978) was an American aircraft designer, pilot and manufacturer.

== Early life ==
Wally Timm was born in Lakefield, Minnesota, and with his family moved to Windom, Minnesota. He worked closely alongside his brother Otto Timm in the early days of aviation and was a pioneer in Hollywood films.

== Aviation career ==
Timm started in aviation as early as 1910. Along with his brothers, Otto and Reuben, he first moved to San Diego, California before relocating in Venice, California. Timm began to work as a mechanic, servicing aircraft for Al Wilson, an exhibition pilot, in exchange for flying lessons. He briefly became a wing-walker, but mainly flew when Wilson performed as a wing-walker.

In 1920, Timm's piloting skills were noted for flying an outdated biplane with a Curtiss OX-5 engine from Los Angeles to Bishop California over the mountains and desert. Trying his hand at air racing, Timm entered the Winter Air Tournament held in December 1920 at Daugherty Municipal Field in Long Beach. The events included a 100-mile free-for-all and a 60-mile handicap race in which Timm took third place in a 1916 biplane built by Eddie Barnhart. Timm joined Mercury Aviation in 1920 as an instructor, although he began to be in demand to fly for the nascent Hollywood film industry. In 1922, Timm and Ruel Short dismantled and relocated one of the Chaplin Airfield buildings to Santa Monica Airport to serve as a hangar for Timm's next ventures.

== Flying for Hollywood ==
In the 1920s, Timm began to fly as one of the pilots that performed "stunts" in Hollywood productions, joining Paul Mantz and Frank Clarke as highly sought-out talent. One of Timm's early movie stunts involved launching a tethered Curtiss JN-4 from the Los Angeles Railway building for the movie Stranger than Fiction (1921). Timm was only the aircraft assembler and rope cutter on the unauthorized launch. In 1930, Wally and his brother worked with Al Wilson, another early movie stunt pilot, modifying aircraft for the epic 1930 Howard Hughes movie Hell's Angels.

Wally and his brother Otto constructed a replica of a 1900 vintage Gustave Whitehead aircraft for the 1938 movie Men with Wings'.

== Aviation manufacturing ==
In 1934, Wally and his brother Otto joined to form a new company named the Timm Airplane Company at Glendale Airport, to produce the Timm T-S140. The design featured a high wing, powered by twin engines, using new features developed at NACA such as flaps and tricycle landing gear.

Timm formed the Wally Timm Company in Glendale, California. He purchased the rights to the Kinner Sportwing, a side-by-side monoplane training aircraft, and modified it as a tandem-seat trainer to compete for the Civilian Pilot Training Program buildup prior to World War II. The Timm Aerocraft 2AS lost out to a Fairchild design.

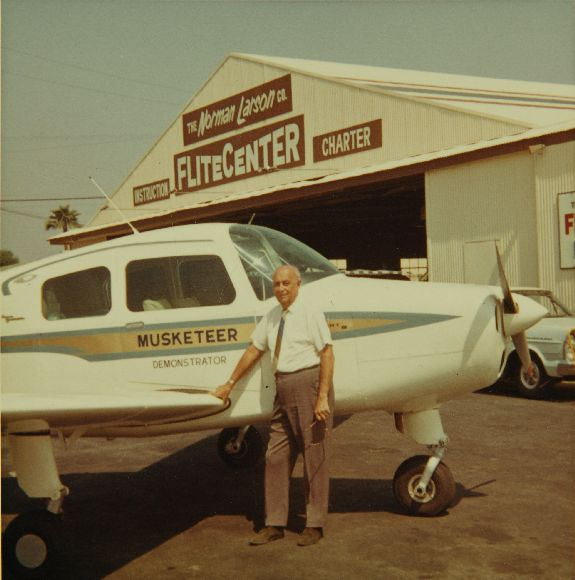
Wally Timm at the Norman Lawson Flite Center, c. 1950

== Later years ==
After World War II, Timm became a distributor for Taylorcraft aircraft at Whiteman Airport in California, as well as partnering with Norman Larson in Seattle to sell Beechcraft aircraft. One of their modified Beechcraft Bonanza's, the "Waikiki Beach", was piloted on a world record flight by Bill Odom and is displayed in the Smithsonian National Air and Space Museum. Timm remained an active pilot into the late 1950s.

In his later years, Timm was remembered as a "cultured, refined gentleman of the old school." He died on April 29, 1978 (aged 81) at El Cajon, California.
