= The Eagle's Talons =

1923 film

- French theatrical release poster for Part 1
- Directed by: Duke Worne
- Written by: Anthony Coldeway; Bertram Millhauser; Jefferson Moffitt; Theodore Wharton
- Starring: Fred Thomson; Ann Little
- Distributed by: Universal Film Manufacturing Co.
- Release date: April 30, 1923
- Running time: 15 episodes
- Country: United States
- Languages: Silent; English intertitles

The Eagle's Talons is a 1923 American film serial directed by Duke Worne. The film is considered to be lost.

== Premise ==
Wall Street manipulates the world's wheat supply, leading the main characters into adventure and dangers across the globe.

== Cast ==
- Fred Thomson - Jack Alden
- Ann Little - Enid Markham
- Al Wilson - Charles Dean
- Herbert Fortier - Gregory Markham
- Joseph W. Girard - Burton Thorne
- Edith Stayart - Helen Thorne
- Edward Cecil - Judson Steele
- Roy Tompkins - Cinders
- Joe Bonomo - Thorne's henchman
- Albert J. Smith - Thorne's henchman
- George Magrill - Thorne's henchman
- Tom Tyler - Extra (uncredited) (unconfirmed)

== Reception ==
Moving Picture World praised The Eagle's Talons as "one of the best stunt serials ever filmed."

== See also ==
- List of film serials
- List of film serials by studio
