= Hell's Angels (film) =

1930 film

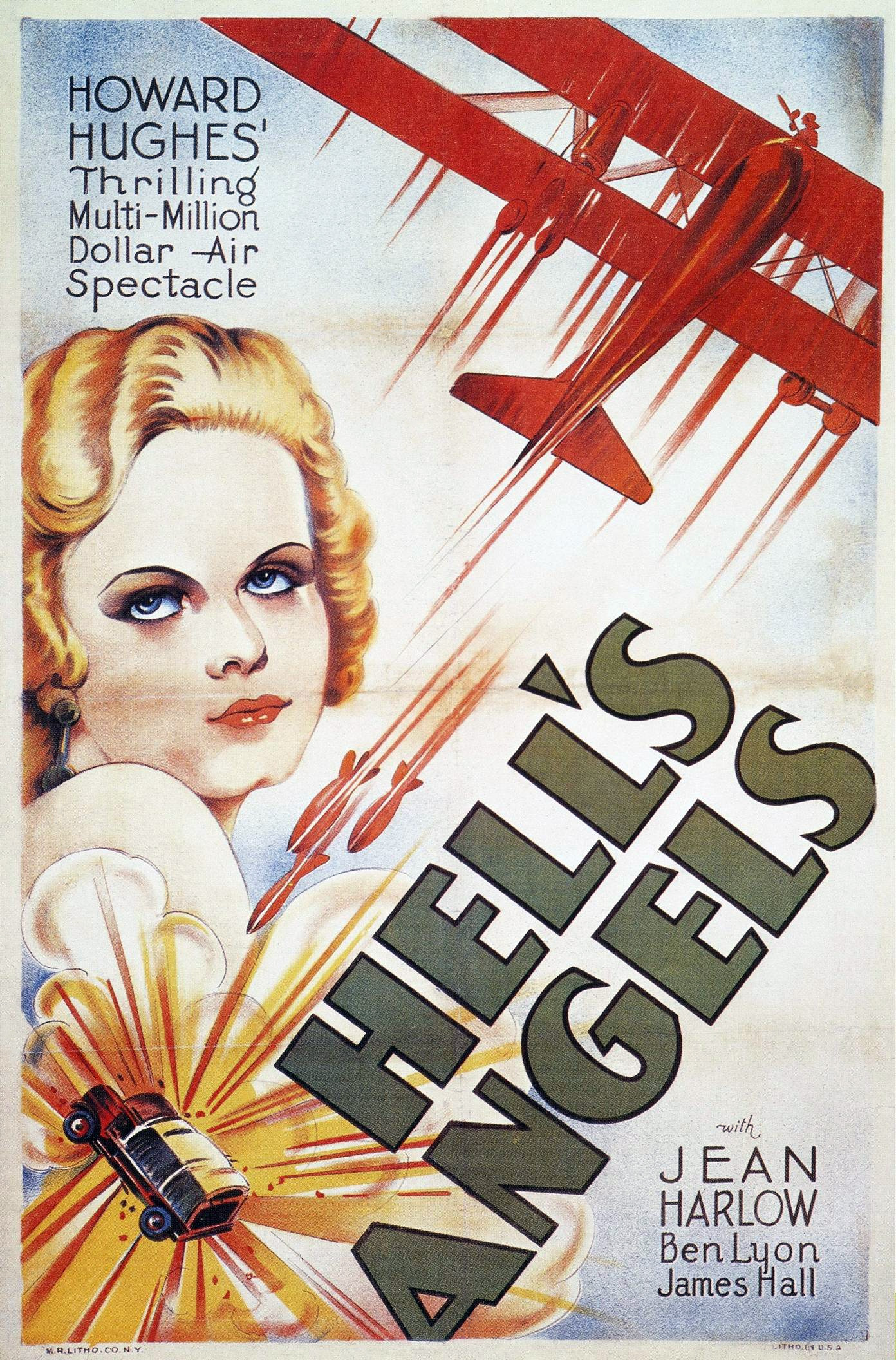
- Theatrical release poster
- Directed by: Howard Hughes; James Whale (dialogue)
- Written by: Harry Behn; Howard Estabrook; Marshall Neilan; Joseph Moncure March (uncredited)
- Produced by: Howard Hughes
- Starring: Ben Lyon; James Hall; Jean Harlow
- Cinematography: Tony Gaudio; Harry Perry
- Edited by: Douglass Biggs; Frank Lawrence; Perry Hollingsworth (uncredited)
- Music by: Hugo Riesenfeld
- Production company: The Caddo Company (de)
- Distributed by: United Artists
- Release dates: May 27, 1930 (Grauman's Chinese Theatre); November 15, 1930 (US)
- Running time: 131 minutes
- Country: United States
- Language: English
- Budget: $2.8 million
- Box office: $2.5 million (theatrical rental)

Hell's Angels is a 1930 American pre-Code independent epic war film directed and produced by Howard Hughes, with dialogue directed by James Whale. Written by Harry Behn and Howard Estabrook and starring Ben Lyon, James Hall and Jean Harlow, it was released through United Artists. It follows two dissimilar brothers, both members of the British Royal Flying Corps during the First World War.

The film was originally shot as a silent film. The Jazz Singer, which ushered in the sound era, premiered several weeks before the start of principal photography for Hell's Angels and left the public clamoring for talking pictures. A year and a half later, Hughes decided to convert his film to sound. The original female lead, Norwegian-American Greta Nissen, had to be replaced due to her accent. Jean Harlow became a major star as her successor. The production took three years (1927–1930) and Hughes spared no expense, so that despite being one of the highest-grossing films of the early sound era, it did not recoup its exorbitant $2.8 million cost.

Hughes and pilot Harry Perry designed many of the stunts for the dogfighting scenes. When Paul Mantz, the principal stunt pilot, informed Hughes that a stunt in the final scene was too dangerous, Hughes piloted the aircraft himself, but crashed; he suffered a skull fracture and had to undergo facial surgery as well. Three stunt pilots and a mechanic died in accidents during filming.

Most of the footage is black-and-white, but there are several one-color-tinted scenes for dramatic effect, such as a nighttime gun duel; part-screen full-color for the flames consuming a German Zeppelin; and full-screen full-color for one sequence, which is the only color footage of Harlow's career.

In spite of the difficulties, it was and is today considered a landmark of early sound and color use, and of the epic action film genre.

== Plot ==
Hell's Angels (1930)

Roy and Monte Rutledge are very different British brothers. Straitlaced Roy loves and idealizes the supposedly demure Helen, but Monte is a womanizer. Their German friend and fellow University of Oxford student Karl is against the idea of having to fight England if another war breaks out.

Meanwhile, in Munich, the oblivious Monte is caught in the arms of a woman by her German officer husband, who insists upon a duel the next morning. Monte flees that night. When Roy is mistaken for his brother, he goes ahead with the duel and is shot in the arm.

Karl is conscripted into the German Navy, and the two British brothers enlist in the Royal Flying Corps. Monte gets a kiss from a girl at the recruiting station.

When Roy finally introduces Monte to Helen, she invites Monte to her flat. Monte tries to rebuff her advances for his brother's sake but gives in. The next morning, however, he is for once ashamed of himself. He warns Roy about Helen's lack of fidelity, but Roy refuses to believe him.

Meanwhile, Karl is an officer aboard a Zeppelin airship sent to bomb Trafalgar Square, London. As the bombardier-observer, he is lowered below the clouds in a spy basket. He deliberately guides the Zeppelin over water, where the bombs have no effect. Four RFC fighters are sent to intercept the Zeppelin. Roy pilots one, with Monte as his gunner. To gain altitude and speed more quickly, the airship commander decides to sacrifice Karl by cutting the cable that secures his pod. When that is not enough, he orders everything possible to be jettisoned. He then accepts the advice of another officer; the officer and other crewmen obediently leap to their deaths "for Kaiser and fatherland." German machine gunners shoot down three aircraft; Roy and Monte survive a crash landing. After his machine guns jam or run out of ammunition, the last British pilot aloft dives his fighter into the dirigible, setting it ablaze. The brothers narrowly avoid being killed by the crashing Zeppelin.

Later, Monte is branded a coward in France for shirking his duty when another pilot takes his place and is shot down. Roy and Monte step up when a staff colonel asks for two volunteers for a suicide mission. They are to destroy a vital enemy munitions depot. They will sneak in using a captured German bomber the next morning so that a British brigade will have a chance in their otherwise hopeless afternoon attack.

Roy discovers a drunk Helen in a nightclub with Captain Redfield that night. When he tries to take her home, she turns on him, revealing that she never loved him, that she was, in fact, not the young innocent he believed her to be. Devastated, Roy joins Monte for some carousing. Monte decides not to go on the mission and nearly persuades Roy to do the same, but in the end, Roy drags Monte back to the airfield.

They blow up the German munitions dump but get caught in the act by the Imperial German Flying Corps squadron nicknamed the Flying Circus and led by the legendary "Red Baron" – Manfred von Richthofen. Monte defends the bomber with a machine gun until their squadron arrives, and a dogfight breaks out. Their buddy "Baldy" shoots down the one German still targeting the bomber, but then von Richthofen swoops in and shoots the brothers down. They are captured.

As their use of a German plane violated the laws and customs of war, the brothers have the option of talking or facing a firing squad by none other than Roy's old dueling opponent. Monte decides to reveal all he knows of the attack to save his own life. Unable to change his brother's mind, Roy convinces Monte that he should speak with the German general alone. He offers to tell what he knows on the condition that there is no witness to his treason but demands a pistol to kill Monte so no one will know of his cowardice. The general gives him his gun and one bullet. Roy cannot persuade Monte to do the right thing and has no choice but to shoot his brother in the back. Afterward, Roy is executed. The British attack gets off to a successful start.

== Cast ==
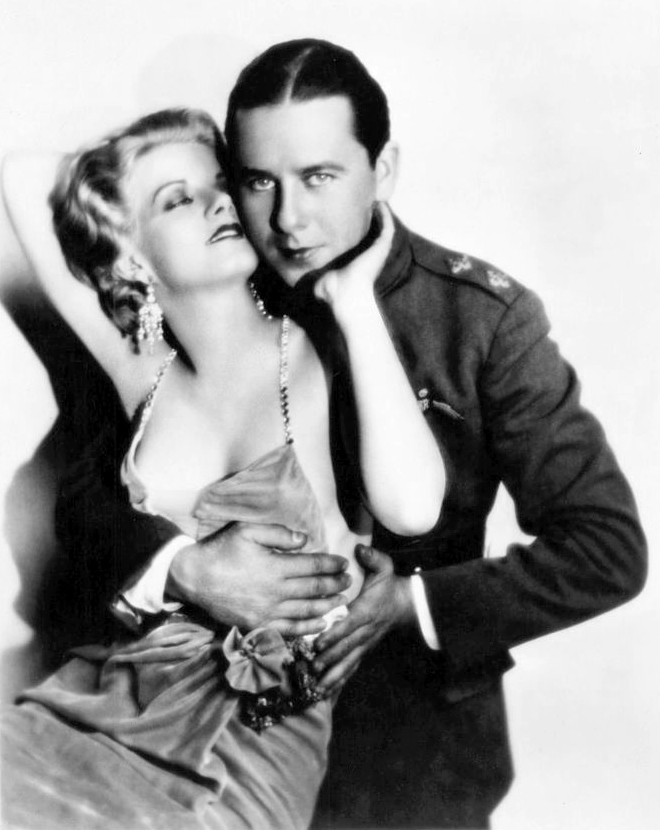
Jean Harlow and Ben Lyon in Hell's Angels

In order of the opening credits

- Ben Lyon – Monte Rutledge
- James Hall – Roy Rutledge
- Jean Harlow – Helen
- John Darrow – Karl Arnstedt
- Lucien Prival – Baron Von Kranz
- Frank Clarke – Lt. von Bruen / double for von Richthofen in combat scenes
- Roy Wilson – "Baldy" Maloney
- Douglas Gilmore – Capt. Redfield
- Jane Winton – Baroness Von Kranz
- Evelyn Hall – Lady Randolph
- William B. Davidson – Staff Major
- Wyndham Standing – RFC squadron commander
- Lena Melana – Gretchen, waitress
- Marian Marsh – Girl selling kisses (as Marilyn Morgan)
- Carl von Haartman – Zeppelin commander
- F. Schumann-Heink – First officer of the zeppelin
- Stephen Carr – Elliott
- Thomas Carr – Pilot
- J. Granville-Davis – Pilot
- Hans Joby – Von Schlieben (uncredited)
- Pat Somerset – Marryat (uncredited)
- Wilhelm von Brincken – Von Richthofen (uncredited)

== Production ==
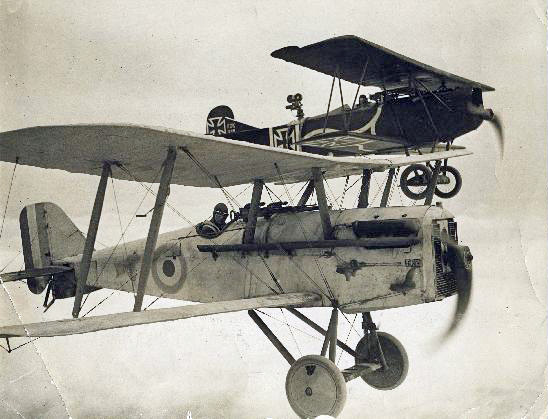
Roy Wilson flying an S.E.5A (front) and Frank Clarke flying a Fokker D.VII (back) in Hell's Angels.

Hell's Angels had been originally conceived as a silent, with James Hall and Ben Lyon as Roy and Monte Rutledge, and Norwegian silent film star Greta Nissen cast as Helen, the female lead, and was to be directed by Marshall Neilan. Principal photography began on October 31, 1927, with interiors shot at the Metropolitan Studio in Hollywood. A few weeks into production, however, Hughes' overbearing production techniques forced Neilan to quit. Hughes first hired Luther Reed, on loan from Paramount but still was in conflict over directing roles before hiring a more pliable director, Edmund Goulding, but took over the directing reins when it came to the frenetic aerial battle scenes.

The advent of the sound motion picture came with the arrival of The Jazz Singer, which premiered several weeks before the start of Hell's Angels principal photography. This left the public clamoring for talking pictures and a year and a half into production, after divorcing his wife, the death of two stunt pilots and a mechanic, going through two directors and 2 million dollars, Hughes incorporated the new technology into the half-finished film, but Greta Nissen became the first casualty of the sound age, due to her pronounced Norwegian accent. He paid her for her work and cooperation, and replaced her, because her accent would make her role as a British aristocrat ludicrous. The role was soon filled with a teenage up-and-coming star found by Hall in a revue, and hired by Hughes himself, Jean Harlow.

When Hughes made the decision to turn Hell's Angels into a talkie, he hired a then-unknown James Whale, who had just arrived in Hollywood following a successful turn directing the play Journey's End in London and on Broadway, to direct the talking sequences; it was Whale's film debut, and arguably prepared him for the later success he would have with the feature version of Journey's End, Waterloo Bridge, and, most famously, the 1931 version of Frankenstein. Unhappy with the script, Whale brought in Joseph Moncure March to re-write it. Hughes later gave March the Luger pistol used in the famous execution scene near the film's ending.

One talking scene, filmed in Multicolor but printed by Technicolor, provides the only color film footage of Jean Harlow. (Multicolor was not prepared to print the number of inserts needed for the wide release Hughes wanted.) The inexperienced actress, just 18 years old at the time she was cast, required a great deal of attention from Whale, who shut down production for three days while he worked Harlow through her scenes.

During principal photography, Hughes, along with pilot Harry Perry, designed many of the aerial stunts for the dogfighting scenes. Pioneering aerial cinematographer Elmer Dyer captured many of the aerial scenes with Paul Mantz flying as the principal stunt pilot, leading the team of actual World War I pilots hired by Hughes. Hughes, himself an accomplished aviator, personally directed the aerial scenes from overhead, using radio control to coordinate the flying maneuvers.

Mantz considered the final scene, in which an aircraft had to make a steep pullout after a strafing mission, too dangerous, and reported that his pilots would not be able to do the maneuver safely. Hughes piloted the aircraft himself, but as Mantz had predicted, he failed to pull out, crashed and was seriously injured with a skull fracture. He spent the next few days recuperating in the hospital, where he underwent facial surgery. Three other aviators and a mechanic were killed during the film's production. Pilot Al Johnson crashed after hitting wires while landing at Caddo Field, near Van Nuys, California, where most of the location filming took place. Pilot C. K. Phillips crashed while delivering an S.E.5 fighter to the Oakland shooting location. Rupert Syme Macalister, an Australian pilot, was also killed, and mechanic Phil Jones died during production after he failed to bail out before the crash of a German Gotha bomber, piloted by Al Wilson, which had been doubled by Igor Sikorsky's Sikorsky S-29-A, his first biplane built after his arrival in the United States. In total, 137 pilots were used in filming the last major flying scene.

Due to the delay while Hughes tinkered with the flying scenes, Whale managed to entirely shoot his film adaptation of Journey's End and release it a month before Hell's Angels was released; the gap between completion of the dialogue scenes and completion of the aerial combat stunts allowed Whale to be paid, sail back to England, and begin work on the subsequent project, making Hell's Angels Whale's actual (albeit uncredited) cinema debut, but his second film to be released.

With the majority of the film shot and in editing, Hughes realized a similar film, Darryl F. Zanuck's The Dawn Patrol, would become a competitor at the box office. After attempting to lease all available period aircraft to stall his competitor, Hughes brought a lawsuit through the Caddo Company and the Gainsborough Corporation, that alleged that the screenplay of Hell's Angels was plagiarized. The lawsuit resulted in The Dawn Patrol being rushed through post-production in order to be in theaters before Hell's Angels. In late 1930, Warner Bros. and Zanuck won the suit. (Note: Hollywood legend has it that the two tycoons settled their differences over a game of golf.)

The film was widely reported as being one of the most expensive films ever made, by contemporary sources, with a reputed budget of $4 million. However, this is a myth created by Hughes to publicise the film, and the accounts for Hell's Angels reveal that it in fact cost only $2.8 million, considerably less than the $4 million cost of Ben-Hur: A Tale of the Christ, released three years earlier.

== Reception ==
Hell's Angels received its premiere at Grauman's Chinese Theatre in Hollywood on May 27, 1930. All the stars and makers of the film attended, as well as Cecil B. DeMille, Buster Keaton, Gloria Swanson, Dolores del Río, Loretta Young and Grant Withers, Norma Talmadge, Mary Pickford and Douglas Fairbanks, Billie Dove, Joe E. Brown, Joel McCrea, Bebe Daniels, Charles Farrell, Ruth Roland and Ben Bard, Mary Brian, Jackie Coogan, Sally Eilers and Hoot Gibson, Lawrence Tibbett, Sally Blane, Wheeler and Woolsey, Joseph Schildkraut, and Charlie Chaplin with his girlfriend Georgia Hale. A program with leather cover was designed for the premiere by famed aviation illustrator Clayton Knight. Reviews were universal in acclaim for the flying scenes but the mundane plot and maudlin characterizations were also noted. The Hell's Angels screening revealed many traits of pre-code Hollywood. In addition to some fairly frank sexuality, there was a surprising amount of adult language (for the time) during the final dogfight sequence, e.g. "son of a bitch", "goddamn it", and "for Christ's sake", along with the words "ass", "hell", and a few uses of "God" in other scenes.

While Harlow, Lyon and Hall received mixed reviews for their acting, Hughes was praised for his hard work on the filming and aircraft sequences. Mordaunt Hall, reviewer for The New York Times, was especially critical about Harlow's performance, saying, "his film is absorbing and exciting. But while she is the center of attraction, the picture is a most mediocre piece of work."

Harlow had top billing on the posters but in the film itself, she was billed third under Lyon and Hall.

It earned $2.5 million for its backers at the box office, which made it one of the highest grossing sound films of its era, but still slightly less than its $2.8 million production costs.

Tony Gaudio and Harry Perry were nominated for the Academy Award for Best Cinematography.

On the review aggregator website Rotten Tomatoes, 75% of 20 critics' reviews are positive.

== Legacy ==
- In 1962, film director Stanley Kubrick cited Hell's Angels as one of his 10 favorite films that influenced his later career.
- The 1977 TV film The Amazing Howard Hughes has one passage where Hughes (Tommy Lee Jones) directs the Zeppelin segment over and over in non-stop takes: although he did repeated takes, Hughes, in reality, shot the Zeppelin scenes and left the partially shot footage untouched except for adding sound. According to film experts, he did not do any retakes of the Zeppelin sequence.
- Martin Scorsese's The Aviator, a 2004 biopic of Hughes, during the opening act portrays the making of Hell's Angels and later its premiere at Grauman's Chinese Theatre.
- The line "Would you be shocked if I put on something more comfortable?", spoken by Jean Harlow, was nominated for the American Film Institute 2005 list AFI's 100 Years...100 Movie Quotes.

Hell's Angels has been re-released on VHS and DVD formats by Universal Studios, which in later years acquired the rights to the film. In its original British release, the censor cut more than 30 minutes from the film. The Criterion Collection released the film on 4K and Blu-ray in November of 2025. It has since expired into the public domain on January 1, 2026.

The involvement of Howard Hughes in Hell's Angels spawned a niche within enthusiasts in entertainment, aviation and militaria collectibles groups. Aviation enthusiasts have referenced the quality and authenticity of World War I aviation in the film. (Note: The Luger pistol used in the final scene has generated some recent publicity due to its public auction in 2011.)

== See also ==
- Jet Pilot (1957)
- List of early color feature films
- List of films with longest production time
