= The House of Lies (1916 film) =

1916 film by William Desmond Taylor

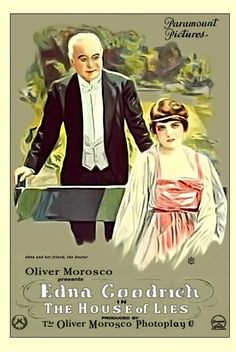
- Lobby poster
- Directed by: William Desmond Taylor
- Screenplay by: L. V. Jefferson
- Produced by: Oliver Morosco
- Starring: Edna Goodrich; Juan de la Cruz; Kathleen Kirkham; Lucille Ward; Harold Holland; Herbert Standing
- Cinematography: Homer Scott
- Production company: Oliver Morosco Photoplay Company
- Distributed by: Paramount Pictures
- Release date: September 14, 1916
- Running time: 50 minutes
- Country: United States
- Language: English

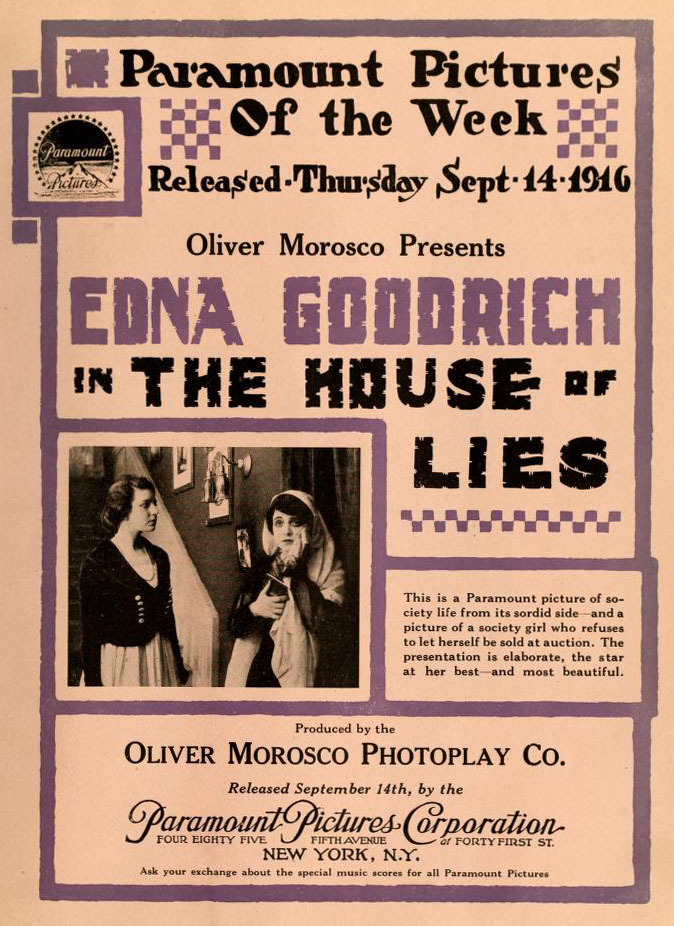
Trade release poster.

The House of Lies is a 1916 American silent film drama directed by William Desmond Taylor and written by L. V. Jefferson. The film stars Edna Goodrich, Juan de la Cruz, Kathleen Kirkham, Lucille Ward, Harold Holland and Herbert Standing. The film was released on September 14, 1916, by Paramount Pictures.

== Plot ==
As Mrs. Coleman's husband's inherited fortune begins to dwindle, she schemes to secure wealthy husbands for her daughter Dorothy and stepdaughter Edna. Edna, however, refuses to sell her beauty for wealth and pretends to disfigure herself with acid.

While the family marginalizes Edna, Dorothy and her mother attempt to marry her off to the wealthy poet, Marcus Auriel. Edna, who has long admired Marcus's work, is hired by him as a secretary and reveals her stepmother's scheme. Despite the scars on Edna's face, Marcus proposes marriage. Edna accepts and later discloses that her scars, like the acid, were fake, and what truly disfigured her was merely greasepaint.

== Cast ==
- Edna Goodrich as Edna Coleman
- Juan de la Cruz as Marcus Auriel
- Kathleen Kirkham as Dorothy
- Lucille Ward as Mrs. Coleman
- Harold Holland as Winthrop Haynes
- Herbert Standing as Dr. Barnes

== Preservation ==
- Though the Library of Congress's database shows no Holdings for the film (*now it does, LOC updated January 2017), an older print catalog has the film as incomplete in the Library of Congress's collection.
