= The Redeeming Sin =

The Redeeming Sin may refer to:

- The Redeeming Sin (1929 film), a crime drama sound part-talkie film, a remake of the 1925 film
- The Redeeming Sin (1925 film), an American silent drama film
