= Her Father's Son =

1916 film by William Desmond Taylor

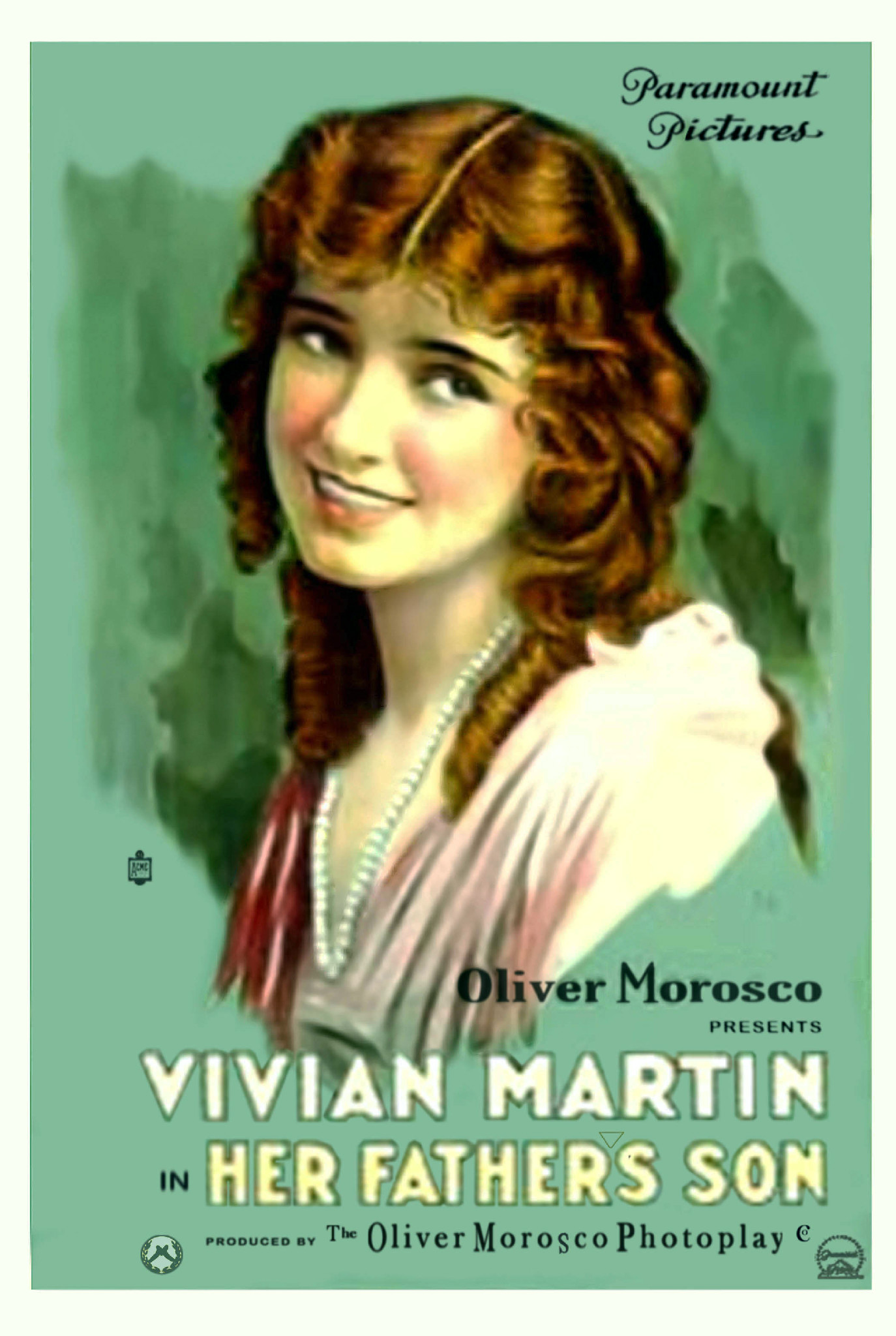
- Film poster
- Directed by: William Desmond Taylor
- Screenplay by: L. V. Jefferson
- Based on: "Miss Nancy" by Anna Fielder Brand
- Produced by: Oliver Morosco
- Starring: Vivian Martin; Gayne Whitman; Herbert Standing; Helen Jerome Eddy; Joe Massey; Jack Lawton
- Cinematography: Homer Scott
- Production company: Oliver Morosco Photoplay Company
- Distributed by: Paramount Pictures
- Release date: October 12, 1916
- Running time: 50 minutes
- Country: United States
- Language: Silent (English intertitles)

Her Father's Son is a 1916 American silent comedy film directed by William Desmond Taylor and written by Anna Fielder Brand and L. V. Jefferson. The film stars Vivian Martin, Gayne Whitman, Herbert Standing, Helen Jerome Eddy, Joe Massey, and Jack Lawton. The film was released on October 12, 1916, by Paramount Pictures.

== Plot ==
When Frances Fletcher, a Southern young woman, moves in with her uncle William just before the start of the Civil War, she dresses as a young man in order to secure her inheritance. Problems arise after the war breaks out and her uncle takes in Lt. Richard Harkness as his guest and the Union officer expresses a fondness in the cross-dressed Frances.

== Cast ==
- Vivian Martin as Frances Fletcher
- Gayne Whitman as Lt. Richard Harkness
- Herbert Standing as William Fletcher
- Helen Jerome Eddy as Betty Fletcher
- Joe Massey as John Fletcher
- Jack Lawton as Willard Gordon
- Lucille Ward as Mammy Chloe
- Tom Bates as Mose

== Preservation status ==
Her Father's Son is preserved in the Library of Congress collection.
