= Redeeming Love (1916 film) =

1916 film by William Desmond Taylor

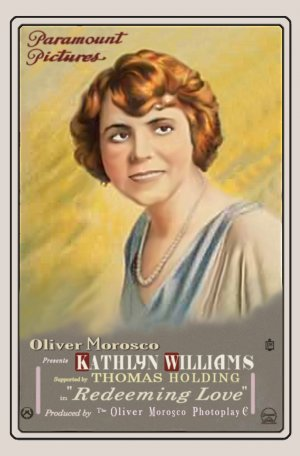
- Theatrical release poster
- Directed by: William Desmond Taylor
- Screenplay by: Gardner Hunting; L. V. Jefferson
- Produced by: Oliver Morosco
- Starring: Kathlyn Williams; Thomas Holding; Wyndham Standing; Herbert Standing; Jane Keckley; Helen Jerome Eddy
- Cinematography: Homer Scott
- Production company: Oliver Morosco Photoplay Company
- Distributed by: Paramount Pictures
- Release date: December 28, 1916
- Running time: 50 minutes
- Country: United States
- Language: English

Redeeming Love is a 1916 American drama silent film directed by William Desmond Taylor and written by Gardner Hunting and L. V. Jefferson. The film stars Kathlyn Williams, Thomas Holding, Wyndham Standing, Herbert Standing, Jane Keckley and Helen Jerome Eddy. The film was released on December 28, 1916, by Paramount Pictures.

== Cast ==
- Kathlyn Williams as Naomi Sterling
- Thomas Holding as John Bancroft
- Wyndham Standing as Hugh Wiley
- Herbert Standing as James Plymouth
- Jane Keckley as Aunt Jessica'
- Helen Jerome Eddy as Katie
- Don Bailey as McCarthy

== Preservation status ==
The film survives in the Library of Congress collection.
