= The Highway of Hope =

1917 film

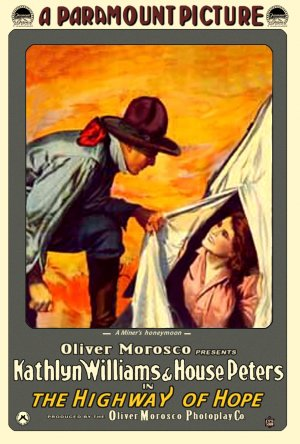
- Theatrical release poster
- Directed by: Howard Estabrook
- Screenplay by: Harvey Gates; Willard Mack
- Produced by: Oliver Morosco
- Starring: House Peters Sr. Kathlyn Williams; Jim Farley; Harry De Vere
- Cinematography: James Van Trees
- Production company: Oliver Morosco Photoplay Company
- Distributed by: Paramount Pictures
- Release date: May 17, 1917
- Running time: 50 minutes
- Country: United States
- Languages: Silent; English intertitles

The Highway of Hope is a lost 1917 American silent Western film directed by Howard Estabrook and written by Harvey Gates and Willard Mack. The film stars House Peters Sr., Kathlyn Williams, Jim Farley and Harry De Vere. The film was released on May 17, 1917, by Paramount Pictures.

== Cast ==
- House Peters Sr. as Steve King
- Kathlyn Williams as Lonely Lou
- Jim Farley as Missouri Joe
- Harry De Vere as Philip Garst
