= The World Apart =

1917 film

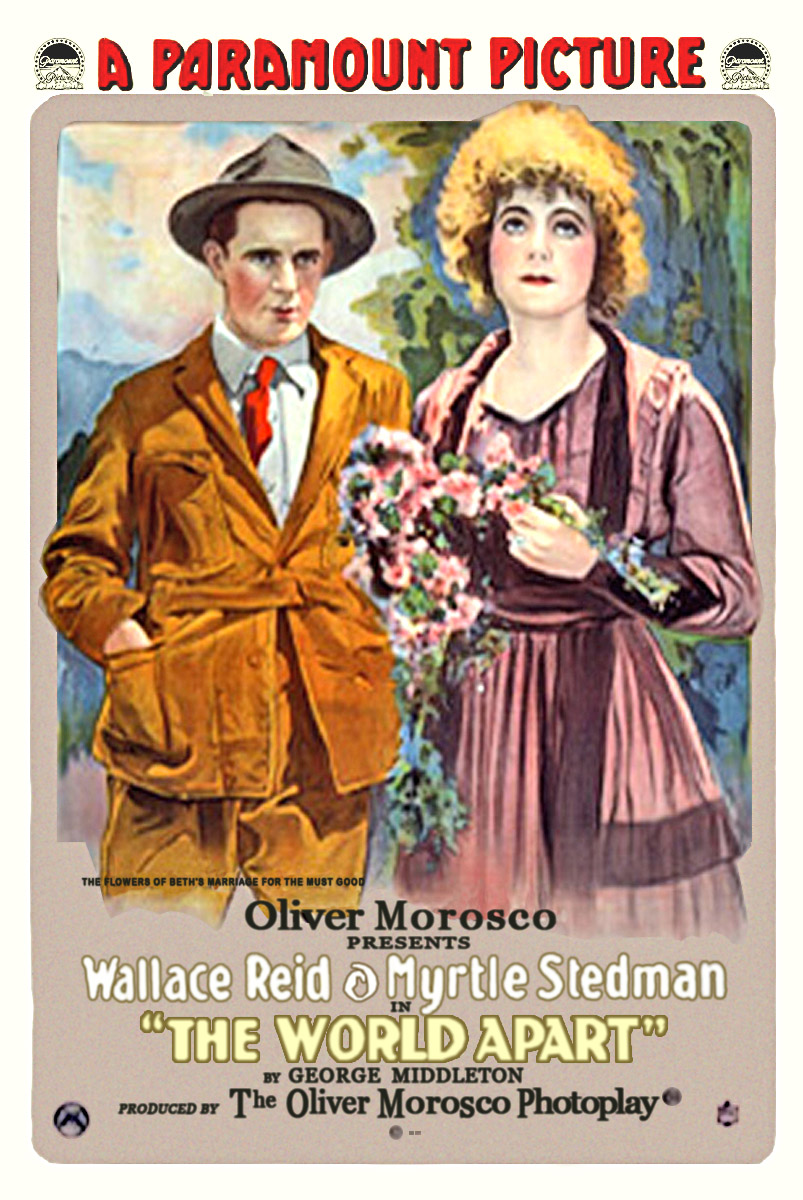
- Film poster
- Directed by: William Desmond Taylor
- Written by: George Middleton (story); Julia Crawford Ivers (scenario)
- Produced by: Oliver Morosco Photoplay Company
- Starring: Wallace Reid; Myrtle Stedman
- Cinematography: Homer Scott
- Distributed by: Paramount Pictures
- Release date: June 4, 1917
- Running time: 5 reels
- Country: United States
- Languages: Silent; English intertitles

The World Apart is a lost 1917 American silent Western film directed by William Desmond Taylor and starring Wallace Reid and Myrtle Stedman. It was produced by Oliver Morosco Photoplay Company (Oliver Morosco) and distributed by Paramount Pictures.

== Cast ==
- Wallace Reid as Bob Fulton
- Myrtle Stedman as Beth Hoover
- John Burton as Roland Holt
- Eugene Pallette as Clyde Holt
- Florence Carpenter as Rose de Braisy
- Henry A. Barrows as Jack King
- Phyllis Daniels as Beth's Mother (Phyllis was the mother of Bebe Daniels)

== Censorship ==
Initially, The World Apart was rejected in its entirety by the Kansas Board of Review, but upon review, was passed with several cuts. They required the shortening of all bar and dance-hall scenes.
