= Out of the Wreck =

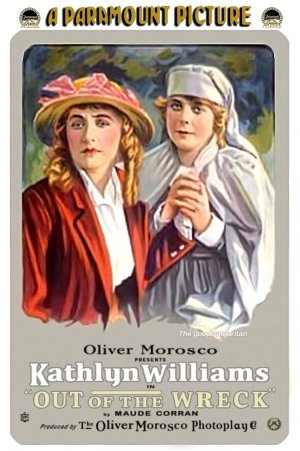
- Theatrical release poster
- Directed by: William Desmond Taylor
- Screenplay by: Maude Erve Corsan; Gardner Hunting
- Produced by: Oliver Morosco
- Starring: Kathlyn Williams; William Clifford; William Conklin; Stella LeSaint; William Jefferson; Don Bailey
- Cinematography: Homer Scott
- Production company: Oliver Morosco Photoplay Company
- Distributed by: Paramount Pictures
- Release date: March 8, 1917
- Running time: 50 minutes
- Country: United States
- Language: English

Out of the Wreck is a surviving 1917 American drama silent film directed by William Desmond Taylor and written by Maude Erve Corsan and Gardner Hunting. The film stars Kathlyn Williams, William Clifford, William Conklin, Stella LeSaint, William Jefferson and Don Bailey. The film was released on March 8, 1917, by Paramount Pictures.

== Cast ==
- Kathlyn Williams as Agnes Aldrich
- William Clifford as Steve O'Brien
- William Conklin as James Aldrich
- Stella LeSaint as Ruby Sheldon
- William Jefferson as Howard Duncan
- Don Bailey as Tom Ryan

== Preservation status ==
The film is preserved in the Library of Congress collections.
