= Happiness of Three Women =

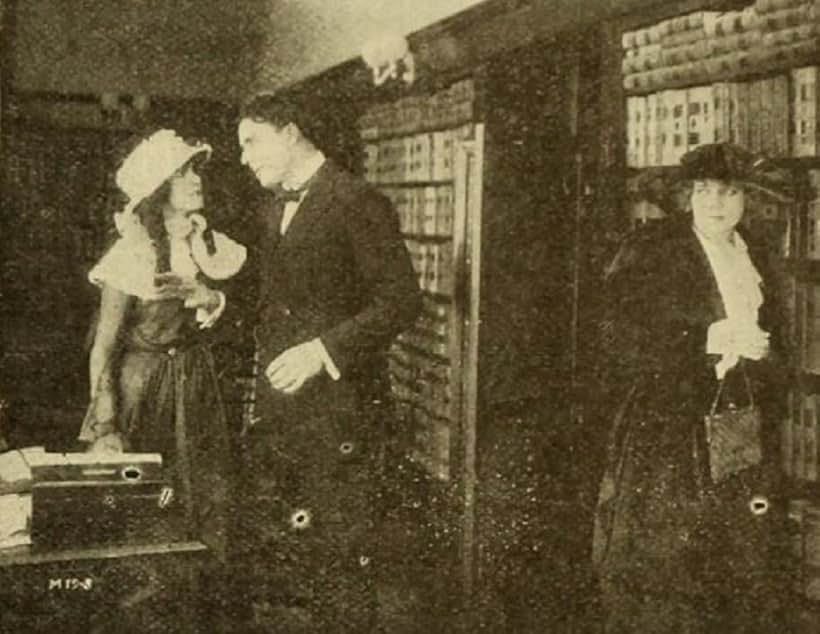
- Directed by: William Desmond Taylor
- Screenplay by: Adele Harris; Albert Payson Terhune
- Produced by: William Desmond Taylor
- Starring: House Peters Sr. Myrtle Stedman; Larry Steers; Daisy Jefferson; William Hutchinson; Lucille Ward
- Cinematography: Homer Scott
- Production company: Oliver Morosco Photoplay Company
- Distributed by: Paramount Pictures
- Release date: January 18, 1917
- Running time: 50 minutes
- Country: United States
- Language: English

Happiness of Three Women is a 1917 American drama silent film directed by William Desmond Taylor and written by Adele Harris and Albert Payson Terhune. The film stars House Peters Sr., Myrtle Stedman, Larry Steers, Daisy Jefferson, William Hutchinson and Lucille Ward. The film was released on January 18, 1917, by Paramount Pictures.

== Cast ==
- House Peters Sr. as Billy Craig
- Myrtle Stedman as Constance Barr
- Larry Steers as Mark Barr
- Daisy Jefferson as Myrtle Gale
- William Hutchinson as Judas Fletcher
- Lucille Ward as Mary Fletcher
- Milton Brown as Monck

== Preservation status ==
- A print of this film survives in the Library of Congress collection, a nitrate positive. An older source indicates that it is incomplete.
