= Don't Get Personal =

Don't Get Personal may refer to:

- Don't Get Personal (1922 film), a film directed by Clarence G. Badger
- Don't Get Personal (1936 film), a film directed by William Nigh
- Don't Get Personal (1942 film), a film directed by Charles Lamont
