= Oliver Morosco =

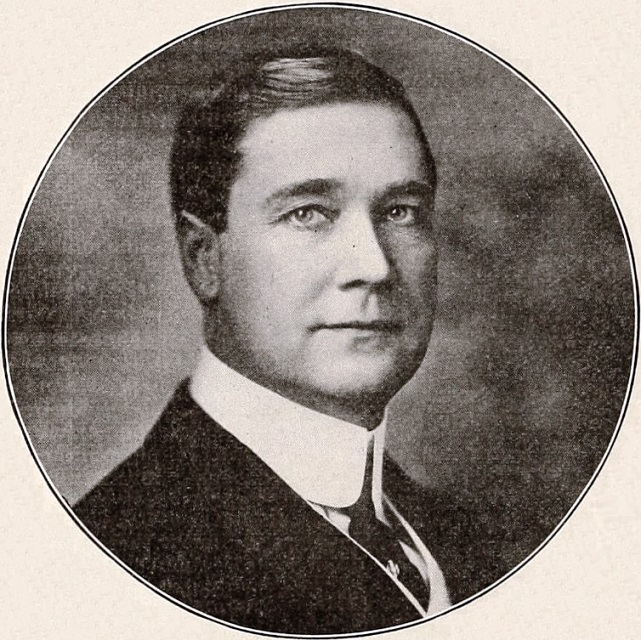
Oliver Morosco, from a 1916 magazine

Oliver Morosco (June 20, 1875 – August 25, 1945) was an American theatrical producer, director, writer, film producer, and theater owner. He owned the Morosco Photoplay Company. He brought many of his theater actors to the screen. Frank A. Garbutt was in charge of the film business. The company was merged with Adolph Zukor's Famous Players–Lasky Corporation in 1916.

== Biography ==
He was born Oliver Mitchell in Logan, Utah, to John Leslie Mitchell and Esmah Badure Montrose. The Mitchells divorced, and Esmah Mitchell took her two sons to California, eventually arriving in San Francisco. At the age of six, Oliver and his brother Leslie, three years his elder, were hired by Walter M. Morosco (1846–1901) to perform in his acrobatic troupe, the Royal Russian Circus, then a regular attraction at Woodward's Gardens, a popular San Francisco amusement park.

Walter M. Morosco made an arrangement with Esmah Montrose Mitchell to become the foster father of her sons, and to give them his name. He was a theatrical impresario as well as an acrobat, and owned and operated Morosco's Grand Opera House, one of San Francisco's leading theaters. When Oliver was a teenager, his foster father took over operation of another San Francisco venue, the Amphitheater, and of The Auditorium at San Jose, California, and made Oliver the manager of both houses.

In 1899, Oliver Morosco moved to Los Angeles to begin his independent career as a theatrical impresario. He took over the lease on the troubled Burbank Theatre and soon made it a success with a series of stock companies and shows featuring the popular actors of the day. Such stars as Wilton Lackaye, Richard Bennett, Edgar Selwyn, and Margaret Illington appeared at the Burbank Theatre. A number of original plays were first mounted at the Burbank and later performed in New York City. These included "The Rose of the Rancho" by Richard Walton Tully, and actor-playwright Edgar Selwyn's "The Country Boy" and "The Arab."

In 1908, Morosco became the lessee of the new Majestic Theatre on Broadway in Los Angeles, and in 1911 took over the former Los Angeles Theatre on Spring Street which had for several years been the Los Angeles home of the Orpheum Vaudeville Circuit, renaming it the Lyceum Theatre. He also entered into a partnership with the Belasco-Meyer interests of San Francisco to take over management of their theaters on the west coast, including the Belasco Theatre in Los Angeles, the Burbank's chief rival as a stock house. In 1913, he opened the Morosco Theatre on Broadway, the most luxurious theater yet built in Los Angeles.

Though Los Angeles remained his home, Morosco began producing plays in New York City in 1906 and mounted over 40 productions on Broadway including Peg o' My Heart and The Bird of Paradise both starring Laurette Taylor. He contributed lyrics to a Victor Schertzinger song he had added to L. Frank Baum and Louis F. Gottschalk's musical, The Tik-Tok Man of Oz, which he produced in 1913. Through this show he discovered Charlotte Greenwood and made her a star. In 1917, he opened the Morosco Theatre in New York.

In 1919–1920, he produced the Edward Everett Rose-scripted satirical melodrama, The Master Thief, starring Francis X. Bushman and Beverly Bayne. In 1922 he produced Thompson Buchanan's The Sporting Thing To Do at the Philharmonic Auditorium in Los Angeles, and then took the play to Broadway in 1923.

In 1926 the once successful Morosco filed for bankruptcy, his fortune lost in part due to a large speculative purchase of land in California where he planned to create a development called "Morosco Town".

At the age of 69, Morosco was struck and killed by a streetcar in Hollywood. He had been married four times and was the father of Walter Morosco the film producer.

== Filmography ==
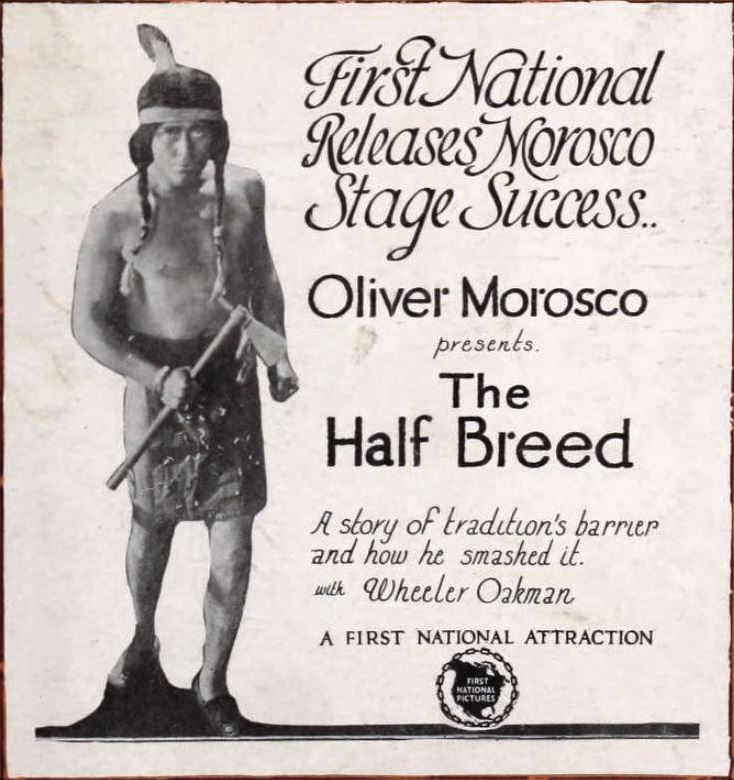
Advertisement for the 1922 work, The Half Breed

- Pasquale (1916)
- The House of Lies (1916)
- Her Father's Son (1916)
- Redeeming Love (1916)
- The Happiness of Three Women (1917)
- Out of the Wreck (1917)
- The World Apart (1917)
- Big Timber (1917)
- The Varmint (1917)
- Jack and Jill (1917)
- Tom Sawyer (1917)
- The Half Breed (1922)

== See also ==
- Morosco Theatre - now demolished.
