= Jack and Jill (1917 film) =

1917 American film

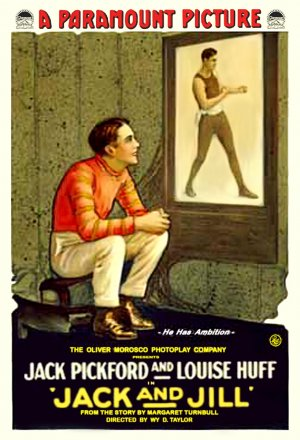
- Theatrical release poster
- Directed by: William Desmond Taylor
- Screenplay by: Gardner Hunting; Margaret Turnbull
- Produced by: Oliver Morosco
- Starring: Jack Pickford; Louise Huff; Leo Houck; Don Bailey; J.H. Holland; Jack Hoxie
- Cinematography: Homer Scott
- Production company: Oliver Morosco Photoplay Company
- Distributed by: Paramount Pictures
- Release date: November 12, 1917
- Running time: 50 minutes
- Country: United States
- Languages: Silent; English intertitles

Jack and Jill is a 1917 American silent Western film directed by William Desmond Taylor and written by Gardner Hunting and Margaret Turnbull. The film stars Jack Pickford, Louise Huff, Leo Houck, Don Bailey, J.H. Holland, and Jack Hoxie. The film was released on November 12, 1917, by Paramount Pictures.

== Plot ==
As described in a film magazine, Jack, an East Side New York lightweight fighter, becomes the dupe in a frame-up fight in which he knocks out a champion and is led to believe that he killed the man. That night he goes to New Jersey and boards a handcar. The next day he finds himself in Texas where the cowboys decide to have a good time with the tenderfoot. Jill, his pal and sweetheart, gets the money due Jack for fighting and, when she hears from him, she, too, goes to Texas. She arrives at the ranch when the cowboys are away and the Mexicans are planning a raid. When Jack hears of her presence, he rushes to the ranch and arrives just in time to prevent the Mexicans from attacking it. He knocks out several Mexicans just as the cowboys, who were wondering why Jack was in such a hurry, arrive. The Mexicans are driven off and Jack is the hero of the hour. He is given a steady position at the ranch and he and Jill live on happily.

== Cast ==
- Jack Pickford as Jack Ranney
- Louise Huff as Mary Dwyer
- Leo Houck as 'Young' Kilroy
- Don Bailey as 'Honest George' Frazee
- J.H. Holland as Lopez Cabrillo
- Jack Hoxie as Cactus Jim
- Col. Lenone as Senor Cabrillo
- Beatrice Burnham as Doria Cabrillo

== Preservation ==
With no prints of Jack and Jill located in any film archives, it is a lost film.
