= Edward Sands =

Edward Sands is the name of:

- Edward F. Sands (born 1894), American murder suspect
- Edward Sands (politician) (c. 1760–1803), merchant and politician in New Brunswick
