= Morosco Photoplay Company =

- Industry: Film
- Founded: 1914
- Founder: Frank Garbutt
- Fate: Acquired by Famous Players–Lasky Corporation
- Headquarters: Los Angeles, United States

The Oliver Morosco Photoplay Company was created in 1914 by Frank Garbutt. It was named for Oliver Morosco. In 1916, it was acquired by Famous Players–Lasky Corporation and became a subsidiary. Charles Eyton was appointed to supervise the company's productions.

It was one of the initial companies involved with Associated Motion Picture Advertisers.

The studio's productions were produced at 201 North Occidental in Hollywood.

== Filmography ==
- The Wild Olive (1915)
- Captain Courtesy (1915)
- Kilmeny (1915)
- Pretty Mrs. Smith (1915)
- Peer Gynt (1915)
- The Rug Maker's Daughter (1915)
- Help Wanted (1915)
- Sunshine Molly (1915)
- Little Sunset (1915)
- Betty in Search of a Thrill (1915)
- An International Marriage (1916)
- The Stronger Love (1916)
- Redeeming Love (1916)
- The Road to Love (1916)
- Her Father's Son (1916)
- Pasquale (1916)
- The Making of Maddalena (1916)
- Out of the Wreck (1917)
- The World Apart (1917)
- His Sweetheart (1917)
- The Varmint (1917)
- Happiness of Three Women (1917)
- The Cook of Canyon Camp (1917)
- Giving Becky a Chance (1917)
- Jack and Jill (1917)
- The Highway of Hope (1917)
- The Marcellini Millions (1917)
- The Highway of Hope (1917)
- Out of the Wreck (1917)
- His Majesty, Bunker Bean (1918)
