= False Fronts =

1922 film

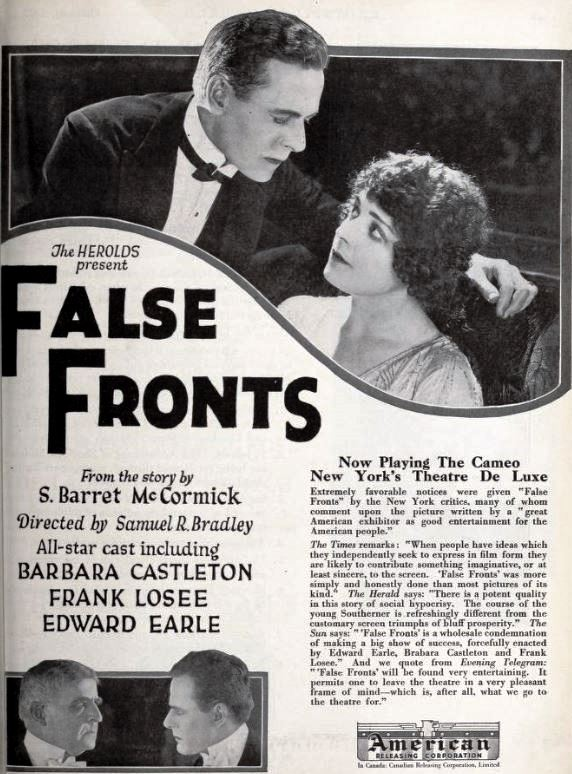
- Directed by: Samuel R. Brodsky
- Written by: S. Barret McCormick
- Produced by: Samuel R. Brodsky
- Starring: Edward Earle; Madelyn Clare; Frank Losee
- Cinematography: Don Canady
- Production company: Bradley Feature Film Company
- Distributed by: American Releasing Corporation
- Release date: April 30, 1922
- Running time: 50 minutes
- Country: United States
- Languages: Silent; English intertitles

False Fronts is a 1922 American silent drama film directed by Samuel R. Brodsky and starring Edward Earle, Madelyn Clare and Frank Losee.

== Cast ==
- Edward Earle as Keith Drummond
- Madelyn Clare as Marjorie Kembler
- Frank Losee as John Lathrop
- Barbara Castleton as Helen Baxter
- Bottles O'Reilly as Jackie Parker

== Bibliography ==
- Connelly, Robert B. The Silents: Silent Feature Films, 1910-36, Volume 40, Issue 2. December Press, 1998.
- Munden, Kenneth White. The American Film Institute Catalog of Motion Pictures Produced in the United States, Part 1. University of California Press, 1997.
