= Daisy Jefferson =

American actress (1889–1967)

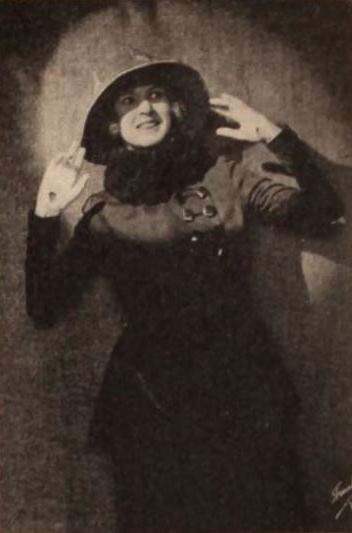
- Jefferson in 1920
- Born: Daisy Marguerite Robinson; April 26, 1889; New York City, U.S.
- Died: June 3, 1967 (aged 78); Los Angeles, California, U.S.
- Resting place: Hollywood Forever Cemetery, Los Angeles, California, U.S.
- Occupation: Actress
- Years active: 1914–1932
- Spouse: Thomas Jefferson
- Relatives: Gertrude Robinson (sister)

Daisy Jefferson (born Daisy Marguerite Robinson; April 26, 1889 – June 3, 1967) was an American actress on stage and screen whose work includes leading roles in several silent films. She appeared with her husband Thomas Jefferson in Rip Van Winkle.

Robinson was born in New York City. Actress Gertrude Robinson was her sister.

Her professional acting career began at age seven when she portrayed Rip Van Winkle's daughter Meenie in a play along with her future husband Thomas Jefferson. She was schooled at the Ursuling Convent in Quebec City, Canada.

== Filmography ==
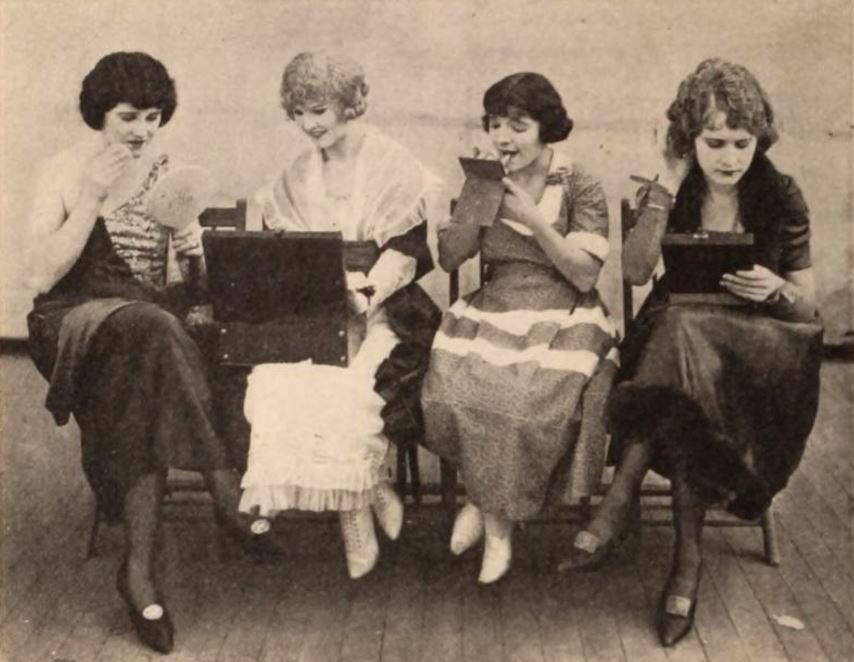
Daisy Jefferson (second from the left) in Fixed by George (1920)

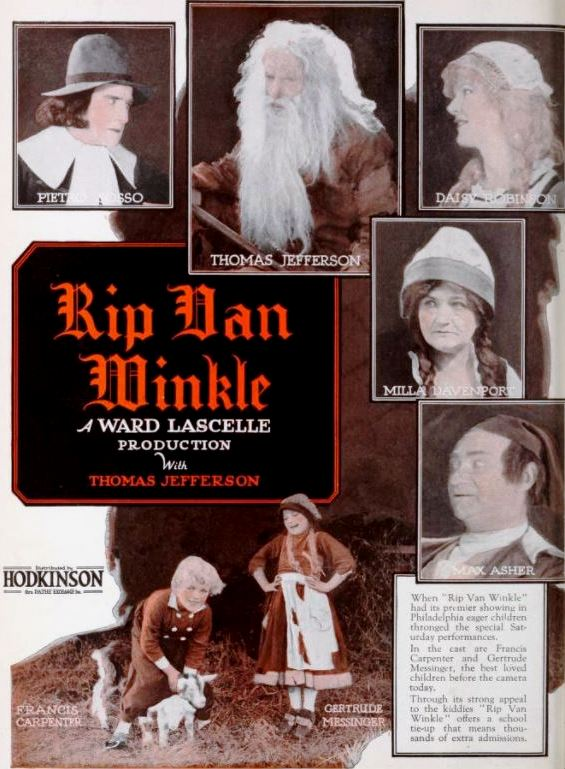
Advertisement for Rip Van Winkle (1921)

- Rip Van Winkle (1914)
- The County Chairman (1914)
- The Law of Duty (1915)
- A Bad Man and Others (1915)
- Intolerance (1916)
- The Price of Power (1916)
- The Clever Mrs. Carfax (1917)
- The Spirit of Romance (1917)
- Happiness of Three Women (1917)
- Fallen Angel (1918)
- When the Clouds Roll By (1919)
- Please Get Married (1919)
- Fixed by George (1920)
- A Slave of Vanity (1920)
- A World of Folly (1920)
- Rip Van Winkle (1921)
- Partners of the Tide (1921)
- Don't Get Personal (1922)
- The Bitter Tea of General Yen (1932)
