= Bertrand William Sinclair =

Canadian novelist (1881–1972)

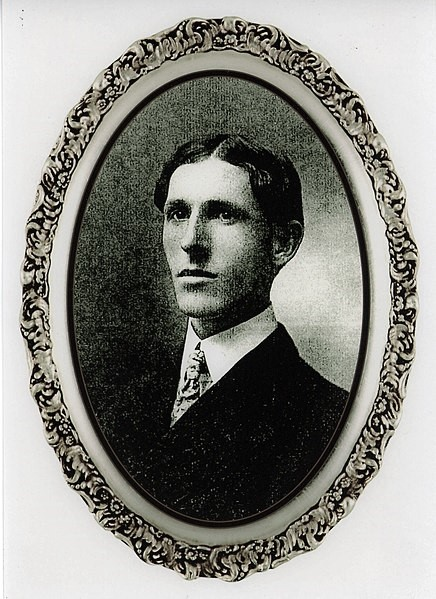
- Bertrand Sinclair circa 1906
- Born: 9 January 1881; Edinburgh, Scotland, UK
- Died: 20 October 1972 (aged 91); Canada
- Other name: William Brown Sinclair
- Occupation: Novelist
- Spouse(s): (1) Bertha M. (Brown) Bower (2) Ruth Isabelle Miner (3) Ora Charlotte Allen

Bertrand William Sinclair (1881–1972) was a Canadian novelist known for a series of westerns set in the United States, and also for a series of novels set in his home province of British Columbia.

Sinclair was born 9 Jan 1881 in Edinburgh, Scotland, U.K. He was the son of George Bertrand and Robina (Williamson) Sinclair. His name at birth was William Brown Sinclair, but he changed it, adopting his father's middle name as his first name. He emigrated to Canada with his mother in 1889.

At age 14 Sinclair ran away to Montana and became a cowboy for the next seven years. In 1903, he left Montana for Seattle and San Francisco, but returned to Montana, living in Great Falls for the next three years. In 1905, he first published stories. Also in 1905, he married author Bertha M. Brown, better known under her pen name (using her first husband's last name): B. M. Bower. Bower, a very prolific novelist, taught him to write "productively" and to employ a formula. Sinclair and B. M. Bower had one daughter.

By 1908, Sinclair and Bower had moved to Santa Cruz, California. They divorced in 1912. The same year, Sinclair married his first wife's cousin, Ruth Isabelle Miner. They had a child in 1912, a daughter. The Sinclairs moved to Vancouver, British Columbia, ultimately settling in Pender Harbour. Sinclair lived in Pender Harbour until his death.

Sinclair's first series of work took place in Montana. Sinclair had disapproved of previous westerns he had read because he felt the action portrayed was far different that the lives cowboys actually led. When he moved to Vancouver, the settings of his works changed (except for two very late westerns). He tended to write about social causes, and worked in the timber industry prior to writing Big Timber. Later, before writing about the fishing industry, he worked as a commercial fisherman and then wrote Poor Man's Rock. Later in life, from 1936 to 1966, he worked full-time as a licensed commercial fisherman.

In writing about the outdoors, Sinclair was influenced in his portrayals by Jack London. In his works treating social causes, he was influenced by Upton Sinclair, who may have been a cousin.

Over the years 1905–1940, Sinclair wrote over 60 stories and 11 "novelettes".

== Works ==
- Raw Gold (1908) (first novel)
- The Land of Frozen Suns (1910)
- North of Fifty-Three (1914)
- Shotgun Jones [screenplay] (1914)
- Troubled Waters (1915)
- Big Timber (1916) (made into a film Big Timber in 1917)
- Burned Bridges (1919)
- One Good Turn (1920)
- Poor Man's Rock (1920)
- The Hidden Places (1922)
- The Inverted Pyramid (1924)
- Wild West, Ryerson (1926)
- In the Bad Lands (1927)
- Out of the blue (1927)
- Easy Money (1927)
- Pirates of the Plains (1928)
- Gunpowder Lightning (1930)
- Down the Dark Alley (1936)
- Both Sides of the Law (1951)
- Room for the Rolling M (1954)
