= Denis Gage Deane-Tanner =

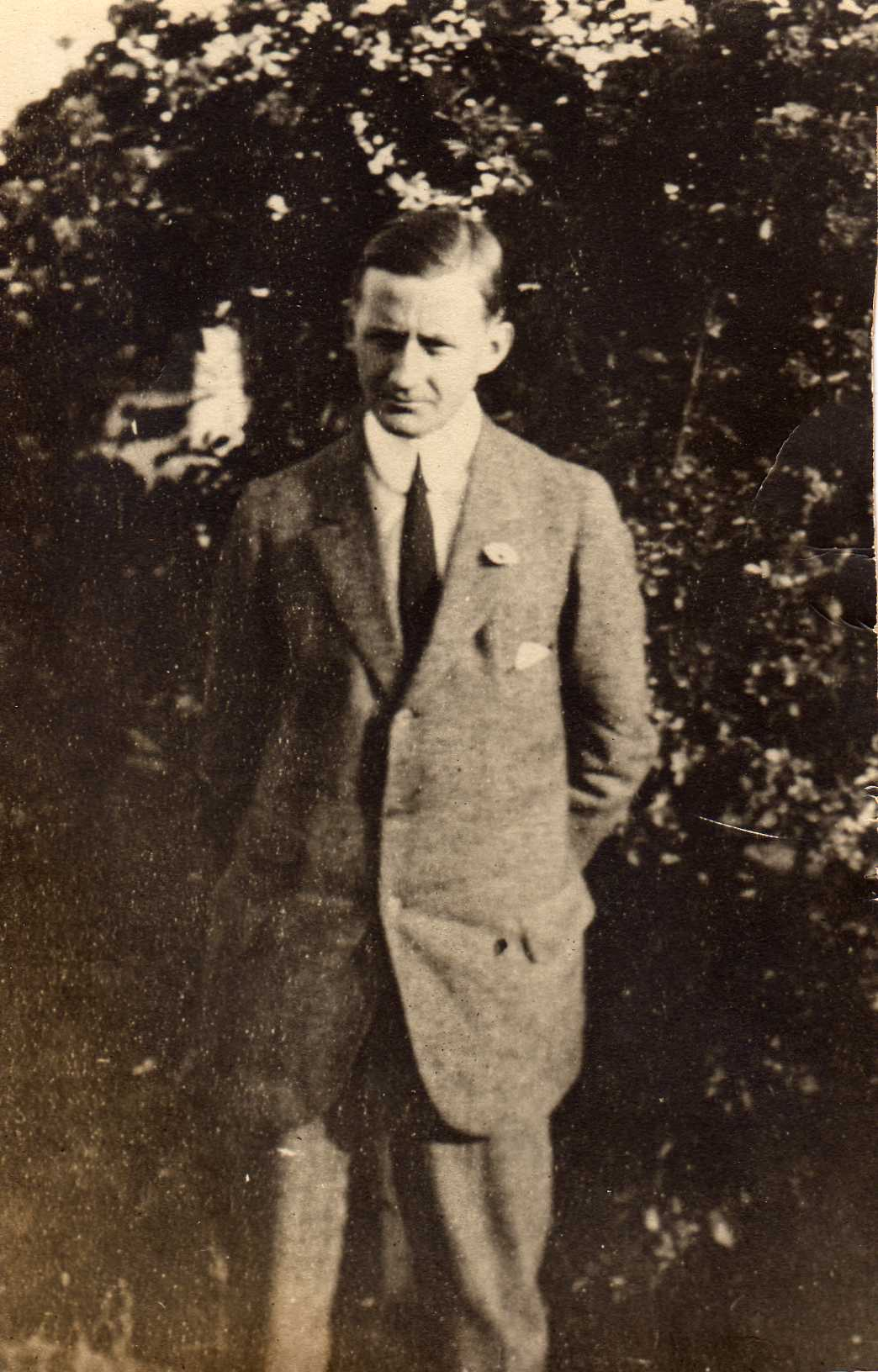
Denis Gage Deane-Tanner at approximately 36 years old.

Denis Gage Deane-Tanner (born 14 September 1876 – ?) was a British Army lieutenant and the brother of William Desmond Taylor and nephew of Charles Kearns Deane Tanner.

== Early life ==
Denis Gage Deane-Tanner was the fourth of five children born to Jane O'Brien (of Carlow, Ireland) and British Army Major Thomas Kearns Deane-Tanner (of Cork, Ireland) in what is now Carlow, Ireland. Denis was raised at the family home, Straw Hall, until he attended school at Pooles House, Clifton College in England. His father was a lifelong military man, who also started the Volunteer Fire Brigade in Carlow. Denis had two uncles via his father, both were Doctors. Uncle Lombard worked at both the Charity Hospital and St. Kevins hospital in Cork. Charles Kearns Deane Tanner, an Irish surgeon and politician was Denis' other uncle. Uncle Charles was deeply involved in Home Rule politics, eventually leaving medicine to concentrate solely on his interest in the Irish Home Rule cause.

Tanner was a lieutenant in the King's Own (Royal Lancaster Regiment) of the British Army during the Second Boer War, during which time he was awarded both the King's and Queen's medals for service in what is now South Africa.

== Life in the United States ==
After leaving the military, he traveled to New York City to join his elder brother William Cunningham, arriving in 1903. Denis followed his brother Williams example and went into the antique business, working at The Antique Shop on Fifth Avenue and A.J. Crawfords also on Fifth. Denis met his future wife Ada in New York City. Ada was from a long established family, the Ketchums of Buffalo New York who helped establish the Buffalo and Erie area of New York before the Revolutionary War. Denis and Ada Charlton Brennan wed 14 September 1907 in New York City; the couple had three children: a daughter Muriel Denise (born August 1908), a son Kearns (born August 1909), who died within hours of his birth, and a daughter Alice Eleanor (born December 1910). Ada and her son Kearns are buried along with several generations of Ada's Brennan in-laws in Woodlawn Cemetery in the Bronx, New York.

Ada who had contracted tuberculosis (presumably from Denis, as he and many of his close and distant relatives had the disease) was periodically treated for the illness throughout her life. Denis was in fact treated for the illness at the Acoaxcet Sanitorium in Westport, Massachusetts and the Ogden Farms Sanitorium in New York during their courtship.

On 25 August 1912 (his daughter Muriel's fourth birthday), after visiting Ada in the Edward Livingston Trudeau Sanatorium in Saranac Lake, New York, where she was receiving tuberculosis treatment, Denis, as his brother did several years before him, disappeared from his family and all known friends and acquaintances. From that day forth, Denis never contacted his wife nor children again. After being abandoned, Ada and her daughters moved to Monrovia, California to be near her sister Lillian and where Ada continued to receive tuberculosis treatment at the Pottenger Tuberculosis Sanatorium which was run by Ada's brother in law Dr. John Lanabee Pomeroy. Eventually Ada established contact with Denis' brother, esteemed Hollywood director William Desmond Taylor. William generously began sending Ada $50 per month to help support her children.

It is believed that Denis eventually moved to Los Angeles, California, and resumed contact with and quietly worked for his brother for a few years. The rumor that the blacksmith in Taylor's 1914 film Captain Alvarez was Denis Deane-Tanner was mentioned in the papers and attributed to an anonymous New Yorker who stated he recognized him.

== Connection to the murder of William Desmond Taylor ==
Many theories exist trying to tie the disappearance of Denis to the murder of his brother William. While the rumors vary from the wild and salacious to mere conjecture, the reality is that through the investigations of both the police and reporters of the time, Denis was not the murderer, nor was he a part of the murder. Reporters at the time floated the idea that Denis was masquerading as Edward Sands, his brother's felonious butler. Handwriting analysis of both men and known photo comparisons quickly disqualified the misinformation.

Denis never contacted his family in the United States, nor his family in England and Ireland. It was believed within the family that Denis eventually succumbed to tuberculosis while living in anonymity in either the United States or Europe.

== See also ==
- William Desmond Taylor
- Charles Kearns Deane Tanner

== Sources ==
- I Know Who Killed Desmond Taylor (1997) by Ed King
- Los Angeles Herald Express (2 February 1937)
