= Page Peters =

Page E. Peters
- Born: 1889; Louisville, Kentucky
- Died: June 22, 1916 (aged 26–27); Hermosa Beach, California
- Resting place: Hollywood Forever Cemetery
- Occupation: Actor

Page Peters (1889–1916) was an American silent film actor who appeared with Marguerite Clark, Blanche Sweet, Constance Collier, Anna Held and others in his short career. He may or may not have been a brother of House Peters as several sources reference them as brothers. A popular actor, his career was cut short when he died at Hermosa Beach, California, in a drowning accident. Several of his films are preserved in archives. He is interred at Hollywood Forever Cemetery.

== Filmography ==
- When Sherman Marched to the Sea (1913)*short
- Their Two Kids (1913)*short
- James Lee's Wife (1913)*short
- The Siren (1914)*short
- The Heart of a Brute (1914)*short as P.E. Peters
- Little Jack (1914)*short as P.E. Peters
- The Goose Girl (1915) as P.E. Peters
- The Warrens of Virginia (1915)
- The Unafraid (1915) *short
- The Captive (1915)
- The Clue (1915)
- The Call of the Cumberlands (1916)
- Madame la Presidente (1916)
- He Fell in Love with His Wife (1916)
- The Code of Marcia Gray (1916) *uncredited
- Pasquale (1916)
- Davy Crockett (1916)
- An International Marriage (1916)
- The Purple Scar (1917)
