= Mark of the Beast (film) =

1923 American silent drama film

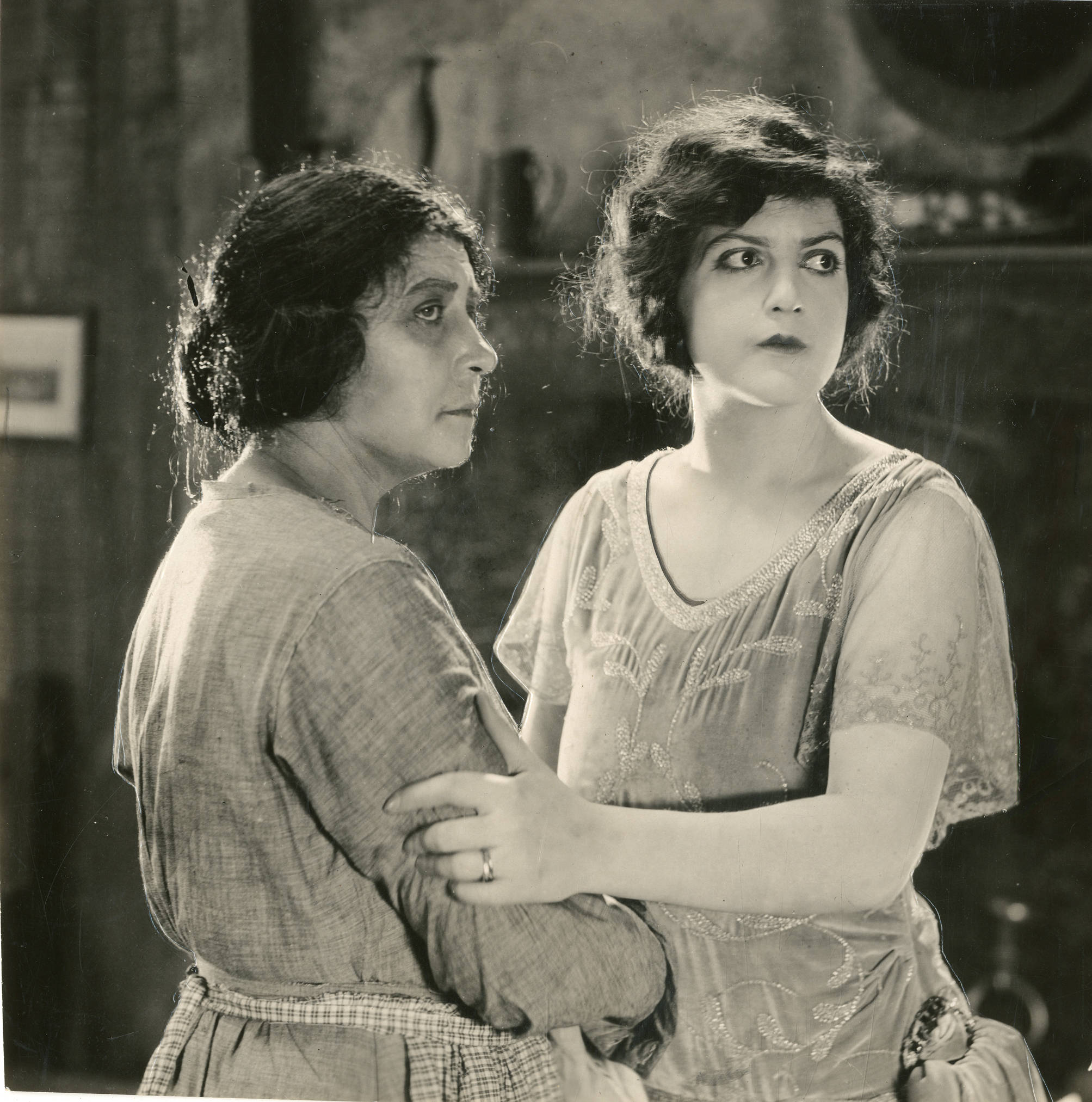
- Helen Ware (l.) and Madelyn Clare in Mark of the Beast
- Directed by: Thomas Dixon Jr.
- Written by: Thomas Dixon Jr.
- Produced by: Thomas Dixon Jr.
- Starring: Robert Ellis; Madelyn Clare; Warner Richmond
- Cinematography: Harry Fischbeck
- Production company: Thomas Dixon Productions
- Distributed by: W. W. Hodkinson Corporation
- Release date: June 24, 1923
- Running time: 6 reels
- Country: United States
- Languages: Silent; English intertitles

Mark of the Beast is a 1923 American silent drama film directed by Thomas Dixon Jr. and starring Robert Ellis, Madelyn Clare and Warner Richmond.

== Cast ==
- Robert Ellis as Dr. David Hale
- Madelyn Clare as Ann Page
- Warner Richmond as Donald Duncan
- Gustav von Seyffertitz as John Hunter
- Helen Ware as Jane Hunter
- William McGinnity as The Baby

== Bibliography ==
- Kenneth W. Munden, ed. (1997). The American Film Institute Catalog of Motion Pictures Produced in the United States; Feature Films, 1921–1930. University of California Press. ISBN 0-520-20969-9.
