= Husband and Wife (1916 film) =

1916 silent film

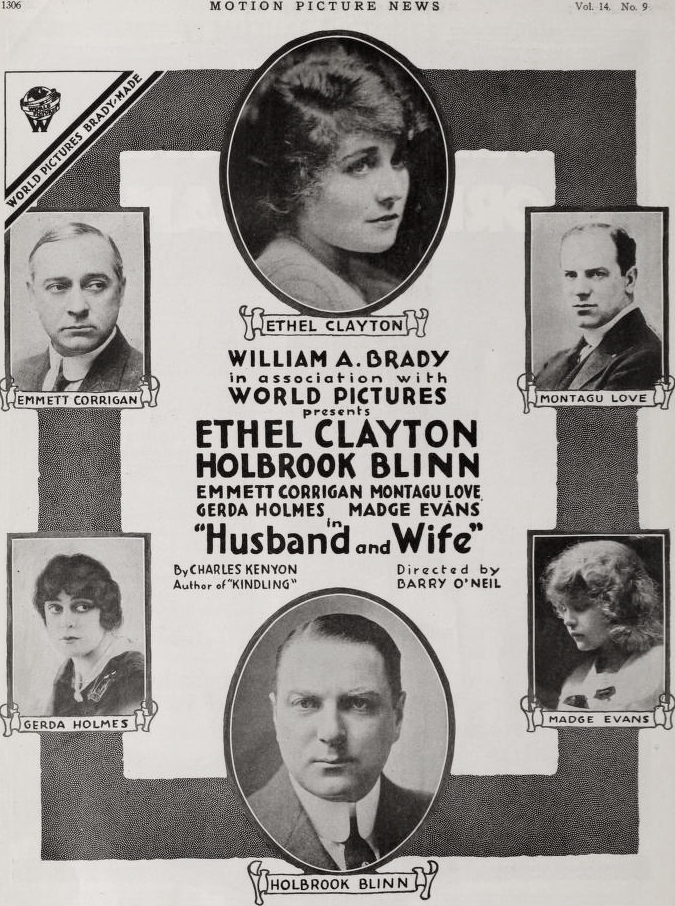
- Directed by: Barry O'Neil
- Written by: Charles Kenyon (play); Gardner Hunting
- Produced by: William A. Brady
- Starring: Ethel Clayton; Holbrook Blinn; Madge Evans
- Cinematography: Max Schneider
- Production company: Peerless Productions
- Distributed by: World Film
- Release date: August 28, 1916
- Running time: 50 minutes
- Country: United States
- Languages: Silent; English intertitles

Husband and Wife is a 1916 American silent drama film directed by Barry O'Neil and starring Ethel Clayton, Holbrook Blinn and Madge Evans.

== Cast ==
- Ethel Clayton as Doris Baker
- Holbrook Blinn as Richard Baker
- Madge Evans as Bessie
- Montagu Love as Patrick Alliston
- Emmett Corrigan as Ralph Knight
- Dion Titheradge as Porter Baker
- Gerda Holmes as Mrs. Prescott
- Alec B. Francis as James Watson
- Frank Beamish as Fred Schrieber

== Bibliography ==
- Goble, Alan. The Complete Index to Literary Sources in Film. Walter de Gruyter, 1999.
