= He Fell in Love with His Wife =

1916 film by William Desmond Taylor

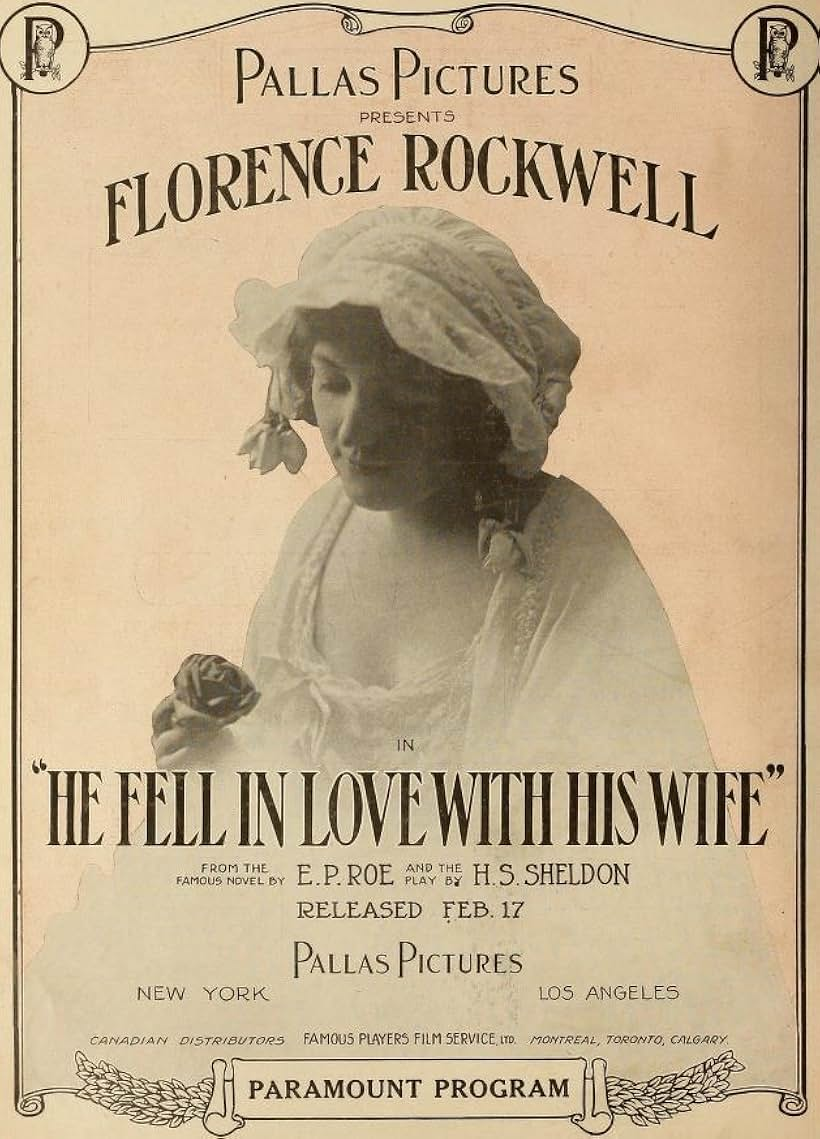
- Directed by: William Desmond Taylor
- Screenplay by: Julia Crawford Ivers; Edward Payson Roe
- Produced by: Hobart Bosworth
- Starring: Florence Rockwell; Forrest Stanley; Page Peters; Lydia Yeamans Titus; Howard Davies
- Production companies: Hobart Bosworth Productions; Pallas Pictures
- Distributed by: Paramount Pictures
- Release date: February 17, 1916
- Running time: 50 minutes
- Country: United States
- Language: English

He Fell in Love with His Wife is a 1916 American drama silent film directed by William Desmond Taylor and written by Julia Crawford Ivers and Edward Payson Roe. The film stars Florence Rockwell, Forrest Stanley, Page Peters, Lydia Yeamans Titus and Howard Davies. The film was released on February 17, 1916, by Paramount Pictures.

== Cast ==
- Florence Rockwell as Alida Armstrong
- Forrest Stanley as James Holcroft
- Page Peters as Wilson Ostrom
- Lydia Yeamans Titus as Bridget Malony
- Howard Davies as Tom Watterly

== Preservation status ==
- A print is preserved at the UCLA Film and Television Archive.
