= If Women Only Knew =

1921 silent film

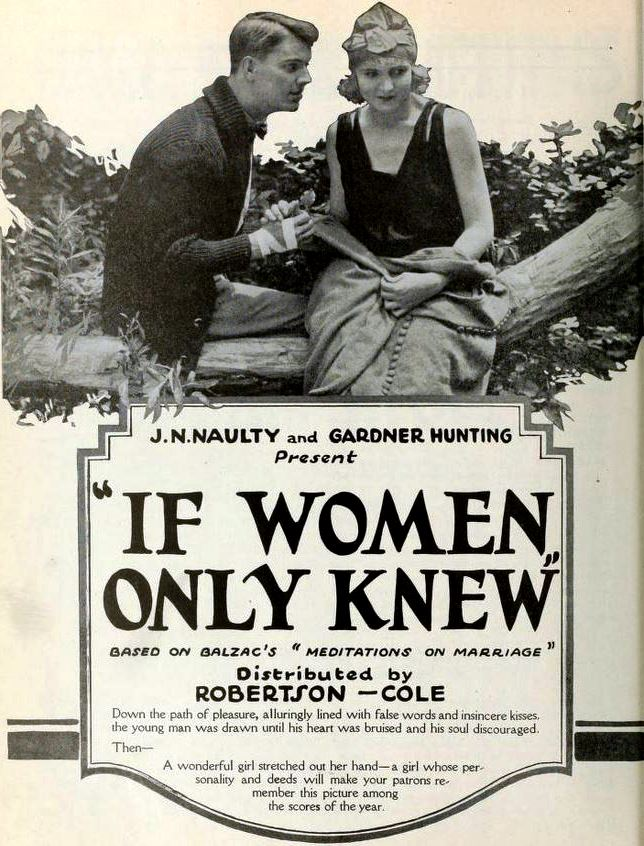
- Directed by: Edward H. Griffith
- Written by: Gardner Hunting
- Starring: Robert Gordon; Madelyn Clare; Blanche Davenport
- Cinematography: Ray June; William McCoy
- Production company: Cayuga Pictures
- Distributed by: Robertson-Cole Distributing Corporation
- Release date: April 24, 1921
- Running time: 60 minutes
- Country: United States
- Languages: Silent; English intertitles

If Women Only Knew is a 1921 American silent drama film directed by Edward H. Griffith and starring Robert Gordon, Madelyn Clare and Blanche Davenport. Its working title was Three Women Loved Him, and was the first film made by Gardner Hunting and James N. Naulty's new film production company Cayuga Pictures. Irene Castle was the original femme lead but did not show up at the filming.

== Cast ==
- Robert Gordon as Maurice Travers
- Madelyn Clare as Madeline Marshall
- Blanche Davenport as Mrs. Travers
- Virginia Lee as Donna Wayne
- Pierre Gendron as Billie Thorne
- Frederick Burton as Donna's Father
- Charles Lane as Dr. John Strong
- Harold Vosburgh as Professor Storey

== Bibliography ==
- Munden, Kenneth White. The American Film Institute Catalog of Motion Pictures Produced in the United States, Part 1. University of California Press, 1997.
