= Pasquale (film) =

1916 film by William Desmond Taylor

- Directed by: William Desmond Taylor
- Story by: George Beban; Lawrence McCloskey
- Starring: George Beban; Helen Jerome Eddy; Page Peters; Jack Nelson; Myrtle Stedman; Nigel De Brulier
- Cinematography: Homer Scott
- Production company: Oliver Morosco Photoplay Company
- Distributed by: Paramount Pictures
- Release date: May 21, 1916
- Running time: 50 minutes
- Country: United States
- Language: English

Pasquale is a 1916 American comedy silent film directed by William Desmond Taylor and written by George Beban and Lawrence McCloskey. The film stars George Beban, Helen Jerome Eddy, Page Peters, Jack Nelson, Myrtle Stedman and Nigel De Brulier. The film was released on May 21, 1916, by Paramount Pictures.

== Cast ==
- George Beban as Grocer
- Helen Jerome Eddy as Margarita
- Page Peters as Bob Fulton
- Jack Nelson as Charlie Larkin
- Myrtle Stedman as Banker's wife
- Nigel De Brulier as Banker

== Preservation status ==
- This film is preserved in the Library of Congress collections.
