= Madelyn Clare =

American actress (1894–1975)

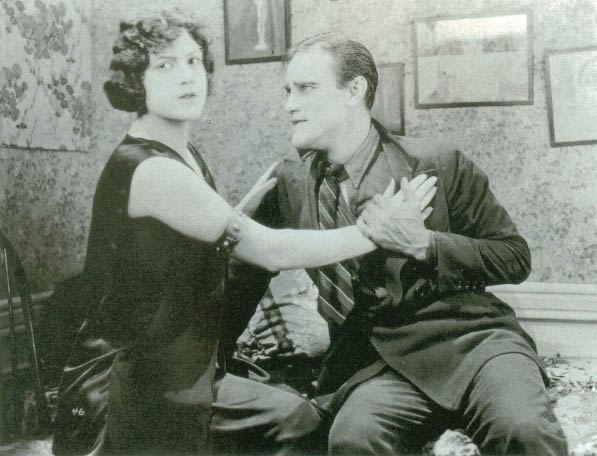
- Madelyn Clare in The Mark of the Beast
- Born: November 18, 1894; Cleveland, Ohio, U.S.
- Died: September 20, 1975 (aged 80); Raleigh, North Carolina, U.S.
- Spouse: Thomas Dixon Jr. (m. 1939; died 1946)

Madelyn Clare (November 18, 1894 – September 20, 1975; also known as Madelyn Klare or Madelyn Donovan) was an American actress during the early twentieth century. She was born in Cleveland, Ohio.

Clare was married to writer and director Thomas Dixon Jr. She died in Raleigh, North Carolina, on September 20, 1975, aged 81.

== Filmography ==
- Mark of the Beast (1923)
- False Fronts (1922)
- The Supreme Passion (1921)
- If Women Only Knew (1921)
- The Discarded Woman (1920)
- The Misleading Widow (1919)
- The Hidden Truth (1919)
- All Woman (1918)
- Young America (1918)
- The Lincoln Cycle (1917)
