= Big Timber (1917 film) =

1917 film

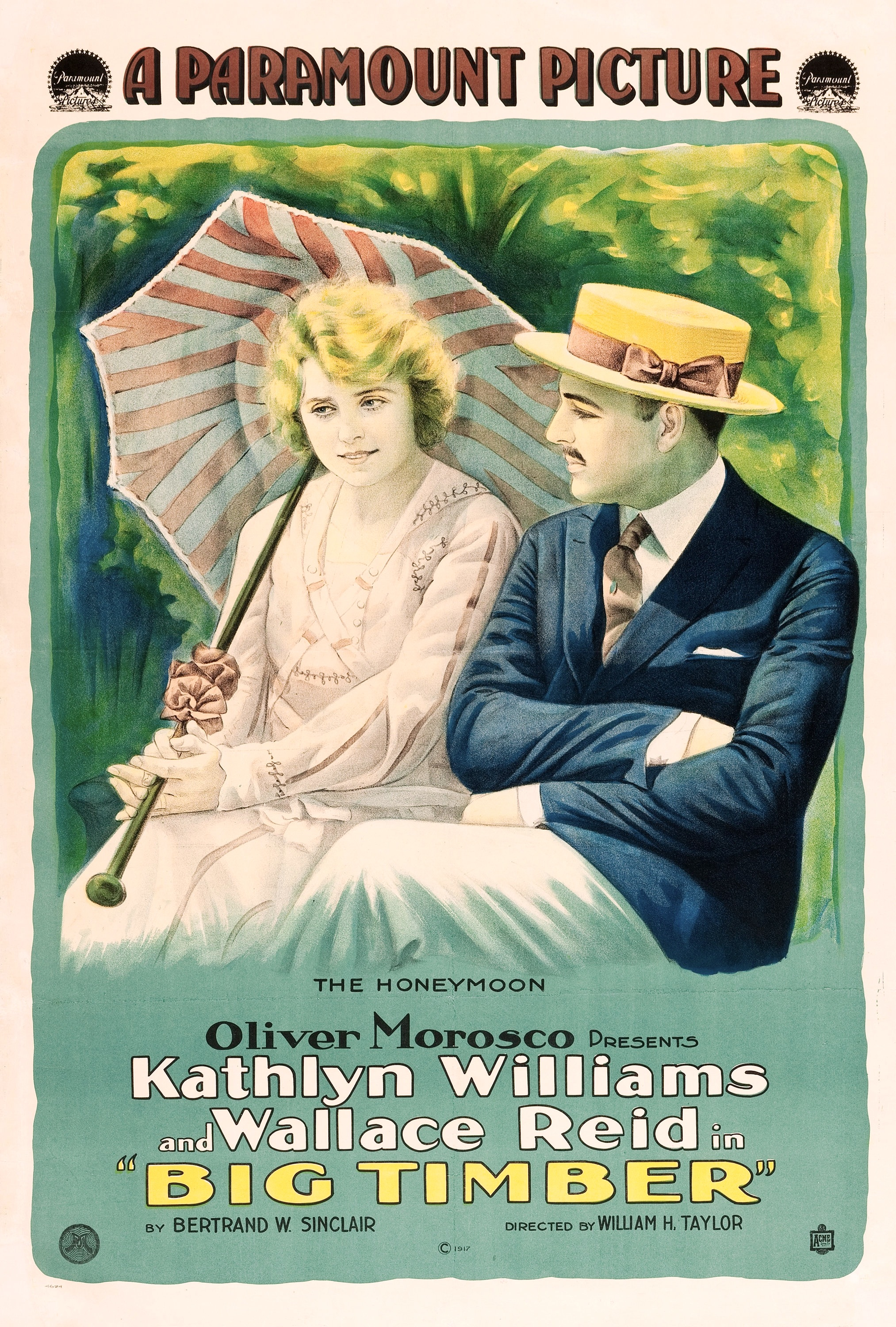
- 1917 lobby card
- Directed by: William Desmond Taylor
- Written by: Bertrand William Sinclair (novel); Gardner Hunting (scenario)
- Produced by: Oliver Morosco
- Starring: Wallace Reid; Kathlyn Williams
- Cinematography: Homer Scott
- Distributed by: Paramount Pictures
- Release date: July 5, 1917
- Running time: 5 reels
- Country: United States
- Language: Silent (English intertitles)

Big Timber is a 1917 American silent film Northwoods/drama produced by the Oliver Morosco Company and distributed by Paramount Pictures. It was directed by William Desmond Taylor and starred Kathlyn Williams and Wallace Reid. It is not known whether the film currently survives, and it may be a lost film.

The film was remade under the same title in 1924 by Universal with William Desmond starring.

== Plot ==
As described in a film magazine review, after the death of her father leaves Stella Benton without a home, she goes to live with her brother Charlie in the timber regions. The roughness of her surroundings proves a burden to Stella, and when Jack Fife, who loves her, asks her to marry him, she accepts even through she does not love him. Jack tries to win his bride's love, but to no avail. Finally, she goes to the city to try and forget her unhappy married life. She becomes infatuated with Walter Monahan, but after she sees him at a café with another woman, she realizes his fickleness, and her love for Jack comes to the surface. She returns to the timber regions where she is happily received by her husband.

== Cast ==
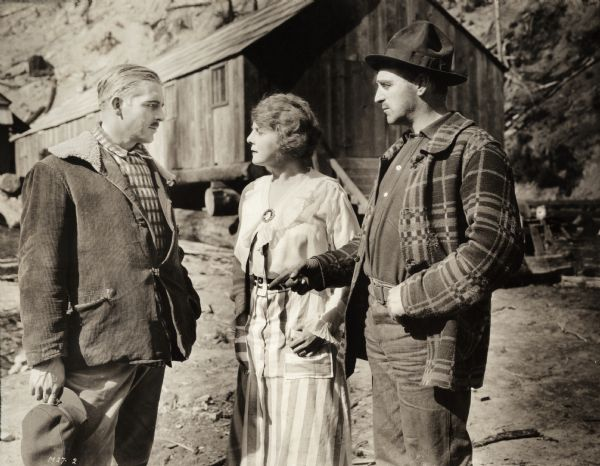
Lumberman Jack Fyfe (Reid, left) is interested in Stella Benton (Williams). She is the cook for her brother Charlie Benton (Paget, right) at the lumber camp in this still.

- Kathlyn Williams as Stella Benton
- Wallace Reid as Jack Fife
- Joe King as Walter Monahan
- Alfred Paget as Charlie Benton
- Helen Bray as Linda Abbey

unbilled

- John Burton as undetermined

== Reception ==
Like many American films of the time, Big Timber was subject to cuts by city and state film censorship boards. The Chicago Board of Censors required a cut in the scene involving the shooting of a man.
