= The Redeeming Sin (1929 film) =

1929 film

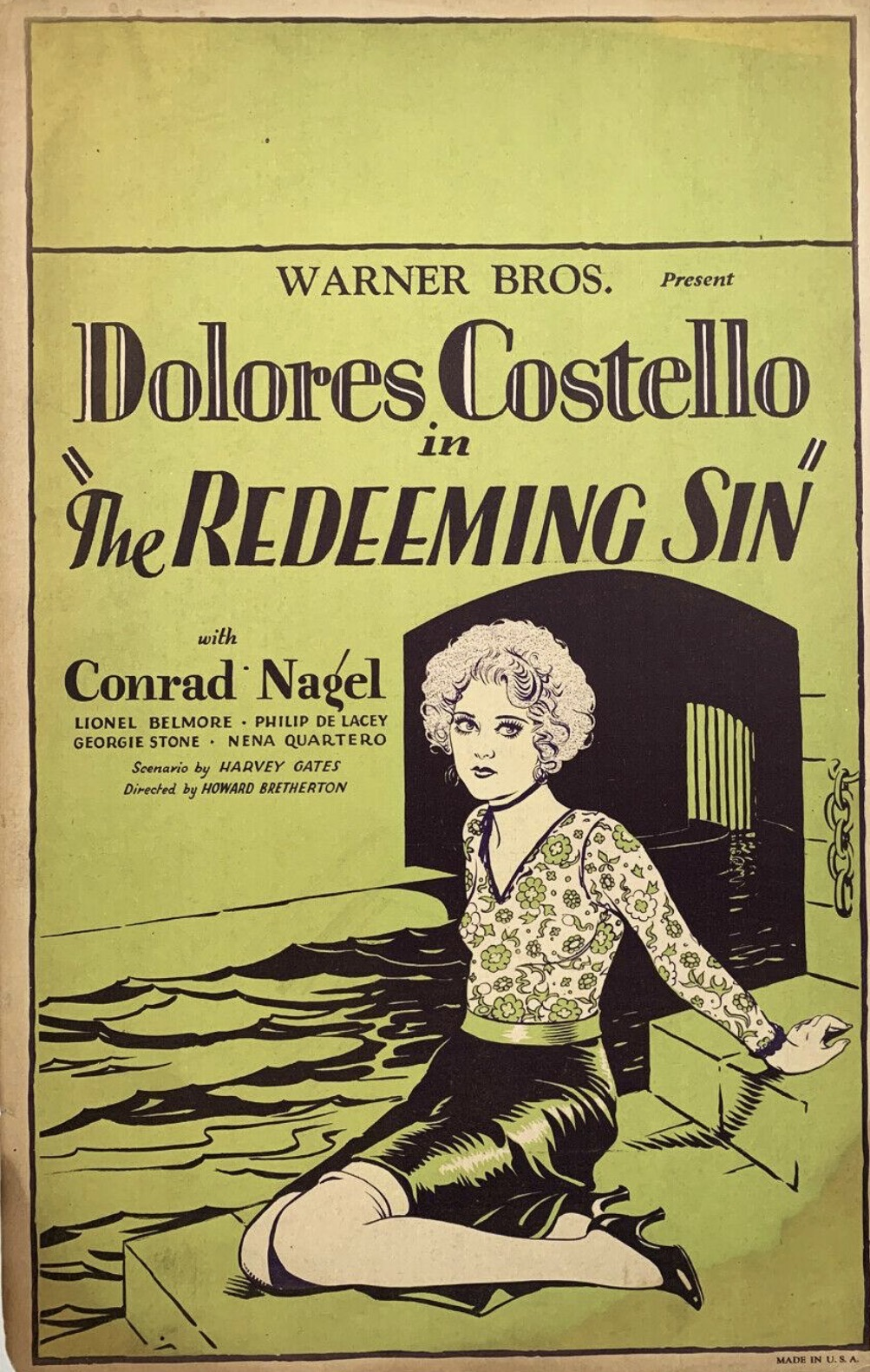
- Window Card
- Directed by: Howard Bretherton
- Written by: Harvey Gates (adaptation); Joseph Jackson (titles)
- Based on: "The Redeeming Sin" by L. V. Jefferson
- Starring: Dolores Costello
- Cinematography: Byron Haskin
- Edited by: Thomas Pratt
- Music by: Louis Silvers (uncredited)
- Production company: Warner Bros. Pictures
- Distributed by: Warner Bros. Pictures
- Release date: February 16, 1929
- Running time: 8 reels; 6,921 feet (6,145 feet silent version)
- Country: United States
- Languages: Sound (Part-Talkie) (English intertitles)

The Redeeming Sin is a 1929 American sound part-talkie crime drama film directed by Howard Bretherton. In addition to sequences with audible dialogue or talking sequences, the film features a synchronized musical score and sound effects along with English intertitles. According to the film review in Variety, 32 minutes of the total running time featured dialogue. The soundtrack was recorded using the Vitaphone sound-on-disc system. It was produced and distributed by Warner Bros. Pictures and stars Dolores Costello. The Redeeming Sin is a lost film.

This film is a remake of a 1925 Vitagraph film The Redeeming Sin starring Alla Nazimova.

== Plot ==
At the Café du Chat Noir, a notorious hangout for Parisian underworld figures, dancer Joan Billaire discovers that her younger brother, Petit, is being taught the art of pickpocketing by Mitzi, an Apache girl. Furious, Joan attacks Mitzi, and in the scuffle is nearly stabbed, only to be saved by Lupine, a thief who soon draws Petit deeper into criminal activity.

Lupine uses Petit in an attempted robbery, but when they are discovered by the store's proprietor, Lupine accidentally shoots the boy. He escapes with the wounded child and deposits him in a taxicab, whose driver rushes to the Café du Chat Noir to inform Joan. Lupine, present at the time, feigns surprise as Joan hurries to her brother.

Desperate, Joan seeks help from Dr. Raoul de Boise. Suspicious, the doctor tries to alert the police by sending a note to the pharmacist under the pretense of a prescription. Joan, realizing the deception, rushes back and demands he operate immediately. Despite Raoul's efforts, Petit dies, and in a fit of rage, Joan tries to shoot him. Father Colomb, a visiting priest, intervenes.

A week later, Raoul's medical practice suffers due to Joan threatening his patients. She confronts him, bringing her dog for treatment as a pretext. Though they quarrel, there's a spark between them, and when they later picnic in the French countryside, their initial animosity turns into romance.

Lupine, jealous of their growing relationship, breaks into Raoul's home and threatens his life. Joan arrives soon after with her luggage, intending to live with the doctor, but he insists they cannot live together unmarried. Joan, hurt, blames Father Colomb for turning Raoul against her.

Raoul confides in Father Colomb, who encourages him to marry Joan, knowing she does not love Lupine. When Raoul goes to find her, he discovers she has helped Lupine and his gang rob the church. As he pleads with her to return the sacred items, Lupine stabs Raoul in the back. Raoul falls into the sewer during the pursuit and is swept away. Joan, unaware he has been wounded, believes he has drowned.

Father Colomb later visits Joan, and she confesses her role in the robbery. Overhearing this, Lupine forces her to marry him as the price for returning the stolen treasures. After the ceremony, Joan hands the ornaments to the priest and reveals the marriage was coerced. As she exits one door of the church, Raoul enters through another, alive and weak from his ordeal. Father Colomb tells him of Joan's sacrifice.

At the Café du Chat Noir, Lupine tries to force himself on Joan. When she resists, he admits to both shooting Petit and stabbing Raoul. Joan, horrified by this confession, declares she cannot be the wife of a murderer. She leaps from a window to escape, crashing to the street below. Gendarmes, arriving to investigate, exchange gunfire with Lupine and kill him.

Weeks later, Joan and Raoul, both recovering, look forward to a future built on love and healing.

== Cast ==
- Dolores Costello as Joan Billaire
- Conrad Nagel as Dr. Raoul de Boise
- George E. Stone as A sewer rat
- Philippe De Lacy as Petit
- Lionel Belmore as Father Colomb
- Warner Richmond as Lupine
- Nina Quartero as Mitzi

== Music ==
The film features a theme song entitled "Fleurette" which was composed by Louis Silvers, Fred Fisher and Billy Rose.

== See also ==
- List of early sound feature films (1926–1929)
