= Florence Rockwell =

American actress

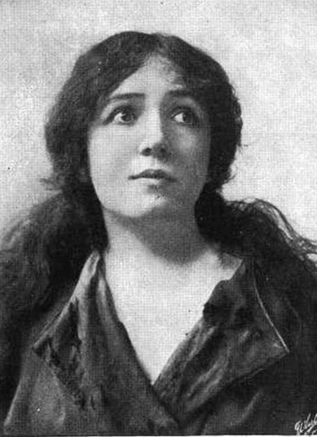
Florence Rockwell, from a 1915 publication.

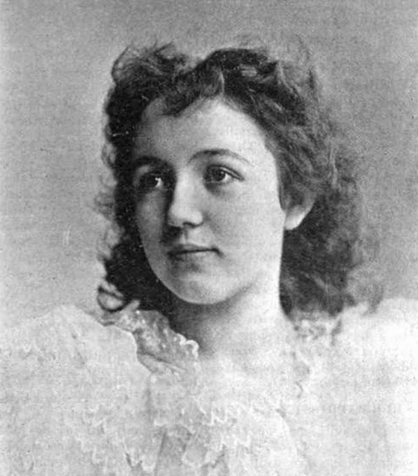
Florence Rockwell, from an 1894 publication.

Florence Rea Rockwell (July 9, 1880 – March 24, 1964) was an American actress.

== Early life ==
Florence Rea Rockwell was born in St. Louis, Missouri, the daughter of Theodore J. Rockwell and Amanda J. Rea Rockwell. Amanda Rockwell was a homeopathic physician and active in a group of women doctors in St. Louis.

Rockwell was a child performer, and played Juliet, Ophelia, and Desdemona as a young actress still in her teens. She studied with actress Rose Eytinge. In 1894 she was presented as a case study in the Phrenological Journal of Science and Health, which found her to have "an uncommonly large brain".

(Her birthdate is often given as either 1880 or 1887; however, she was described as Dr. Rockwell's 11-year-old daughter in an 1890 profile, making the earlier date more plausible.)

== Career ==
Rockwell acted in Broadway productions, including Cumberland '61 (1897), Oliver Goldsmith (1900), The Greatest Thing in the World (1900), Richard Savage (1901), D'Arcy of the Guards (1901-1902), John Henry (1903), A Midsummer Night's Dream (1903), Much Ado About Nothing (1904), Common Sense Bracket (1904-1905), Who Goes There? (1905), Beau Brummell by Clyde Fitch (1906), Popularity (1906), The Mills of the Gods (1907), The Round Up (1907), The Barrier (1910), A Fool for Fortune (1912), and The Fallen Idol (1915).

In 1917, she took the lead role in The Glass House (sometimes titled The House of Glass) during a tour of Australia and New Zealand.

In 1919 she starred in a Hawaiian-themed revue called The Bird of Paradise, wearing a grass skirt and lei, and dancing a version of the hula.

Rockwell appeared in three silent films: Body and Soul (1915), He Fell in Love with His Wife (1915), and The Purple Night (1915).

== Personal life ==
Rockwell married theatrical manager Howard F. Smith. She was widowed in 1932, and she died in 1964, in Stamford, Connecticut, aged 83 years (she was described as 76 years old in her obituary).
