= L. V. Jefferson =

American screenwriter

L.V. Jefferson
- Born: Louis Victor Jefferson; May 14, 1873; Carthage, Missouri
- Died: November 30, 1959 (aged 86); Los Angeles, California
- Occupation: Screenwriter
- Spouse: Gertrude Lambley

L. V. Jefferson (born Louis Victor Jefferson) was an American screenwriter and short story author. He claimed to be capable of automatic writing and was an influence on Jane Wolfe. He credited looking into a crystal ball with empowering him. He was born in Carthage, Missouri. He worked in the Western scenario department for Universal. He also wrote for Triangle and worked with Irvin Willat of Willat Studios.

== Filmography ==
- The Grail (1915)
- The College Orphan (1915)
- The Making of Maddalena (1916) from a play by Samuel Service and Mary Service
- The House of Lies (1916), co-writer
- Her Father's Son (1916), co-writer
- Redeeming Love (1916), story
- The House with the Golden Windows (1916)
- In Slumberland (1917), writer
- Out of the Wreck (1917), story
- The Sawdust Ring (1917)
- A Square Deal (1917)
- Ten of Diamonds (1917), from a story by Albert Cowles
- Put Up Your Hands (1919)
- Charge It to Me (1919)
- The Kentucky Colonel (1920)
- Riders of the Dawn (1920), co-writer of adaptation from a Zane Grey novel
- The Desert Scorpion (1920), story
- Crossing Trails (1921)
- The Face of the World (1921)
- Partners of the Tide (1921)
- Daring Danger (1922)
- Tracks (1922)
- The Redeeming Sin (1925), based on Jefferson's short story
- The Cloud Rider (1925)
- The Primtose Path (1925)
- Flying High (1926)
- The Set-Up (1926)
- The Escape (1926)
- Three Pals (1926)
- The Flag: A Story Inspired by the Tradition of Betsy Ross (1927)
- Temptations of a Shop Girl (1927)
- One Chance in a Million (1927)
- The Haunted Homestead (1927)
- Catch as Catch Can (1927)
- Born to Battle (1927)
- Laddie Be Good (1928), co-writer
- A Gentleman Preferred (1928), co-writer
- China Slaver (1929), co-writer from a story by Calvin Holivey and Rupert Hughes
- Pueblo Terror (1931)
- Trails of the Golden West (1931)
- His Debt (1919), story
- Lightning Range (1933)
- The Fighting Cowboy (1933)
- The Pecos Dandy (1934)
- Twisted Rails (1934), story author and screenplay co-writer
- The Test (1935), continuity and dialogue
- $20 a Week (1935)
- Riddle Ranch (1935)
- The Lion's Den (1936)
