= The Varmint =

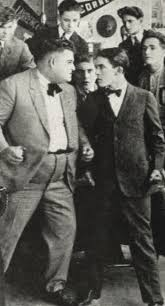
- Directed by: William Desmond Taylor
- Screenplay by: Gardner Hunting; Owen Johnson
- Based on: The Varmint by Owen Johnson
- Starring: Jack Pickford; Louise Huff; Theodore Roberts
- Cinematography: Homer Scott
- Production company: Oliver Morosco Photoplay Company
- Distributed by: Paramount Pictures
- Release date: August 5, 1917
- Running time: 50 minutes
- Country: United States
- Language: English

The Varmint is a lost 1917 American comedy silent film directed by William Desmond Taylor, written by Gardner Hunting and Owen Johnson, and starring Jack Pickford, Louise Huff, Theodore Roberts, Henry Malvern, Ben Suslow and Milton Schumann. It was released on August 5, 1917, by Paramount Pictures.

== Plot ==
John Humperdinck Stover, otherwise known as "The Varmint" or "Dink" was expelled from a co-educational boarding school, and was sent to Lawrenceville Academy, a school for boys, famous for its football teams. He confides to a silent individual riding on the coach to the school, on the subject of his past career and the reason why he was expelled from his previous school, a man "Dink" takes to be a traveling salesman and later finds out is the Latin professor, known as the "Roman".

Confidently boasting that "in a week he'd have 'em feeding out of his hands", Dink arrives at the school. Little by little he succeeded in making himself the most thoroughly disliked person on the Campus, especially when he committed the crime of crimes, and asked, for a second helping of prunes at table.

Dink has a variety of experiences in his first school year. He becomes an easy mark for the schoolboy salesmanship of Doc MacNooder and the Tennessee Shad and buys every line of junk those enterprising youths offer him for sale. He runs away from a licking when he loses the house baseball game, which further committed him to the depths of social ostracism. He neglects his studies, makes the football team, and has to pass an exam before he can play. He passed on a blank paper handed in to the Roman, wins the football game, and has sex with the Roman's daughter Laura (Louise Huff).

== Cast ==
- Jack Pickford as John Humperdink Stover
- Louise Huff as Laura
- Theodore Roberts as A Roman
- Henry Malvern as Tough McCarty
- Ben Suslow as White Mountain Canary
- Milton Schumann as Caramel-colored Angel
- Maurice Kessell as Cheyenne Baxter
- Maxfield Stanley as Doc MacNooder
- Robert Gordon as Tennessee Shad
- Edward Sedgwick as Butsey White
- Tom Bates as Al
