= Edward F. Sands =

US secretary, personal assistant, cook and valet (1894–unknown)

- Born: Edward Fitzgerald Snyder; April 4, 1894; Marion, Ohio, U.S.
- Disappeared: February 2, 1922 (aged 27)
- Died: Unknown
- Other names: Edward Fitzwilliam Strathmore, Jazz
- Occupations: Cook; valet; soldier
- Military career
- Allegiance: (United States)
- Branch: United States Navy, United States Coast Guard, United States Army
- Service years: 1911–1921

Edward F. Sands (born Edward Fitzgerald Snyder; April 4, 1894 – unknown), also known as Edward Fitzwilliam Strathmore and Jazz, was an American service member who was a suspect in the murder of Hollywood director William Desmond Taylor on February 1, 1922, by whom he was employed as a cook and valet.

== Biography ==
Edward Sands had been employed as Taylor's personal assistant, serving as cook and valet. Although he was born in Ohio, he spoke with an affected English accent (screen star Mary Miles Minter referred to him as a cockney). Taylor left Sands in charge of his affairs during a vacation in 1921 and returned to find Sands gone and several of the director's possessions missing, including his car, checkbook, a large supply of distinctive cigarettes, and jewelry. Sands had cashed several blank checks left by Taylor and, using the stolen checkbook, began forging Taylor's signature.

A few months later, Taylor received a letter from Sands which included a pawn ticket in the name of William Deane Tanner (Taylor's birth name), indicating that Sands knew Taylor's true identity, which Taylor had kept secret since his arrival in Hollywood eight years earlier. Sands seems to have returned clandestinely. One of the distinctive stolen cigarettes was found (smoked and crushed) on Taylor's doorstep, and footprints were left on Taylor's bed. Some more of Taylor's jewelry was stolen, and receipts were found showing Sands had sold the items in northern California.

== Military service ==
Sands served in various branches of the United States military (seven enlistments) enlisting under various names.

- He initially enlisted in the United States Navy at the Recruiting Station in Cincinnati, Ohio, at the age of 17. He served on the USS Franklin, USS Constellation, USS Montana, and USS Paducah with the assignments of pay office and canteen yeoman. After serving on the U.S.S. Southery at the Navy Yard in Portsmouth, New Hampshire, he was discharged as a landsman on August 6, 1916.
- On August 21, 1916, he joined the United States Coast Guard, where he served on the cutter Gresham and was discharged on August 20, 1917, as a cabin steward.
- On October 17, 1917, he enlisted in the U.S. Naval Reserve at the Navy Yard in New York, New York. On December 1, 1918, he was promoted to Chief Commissary Steward.
- On February 8, 1919, he enlisted in the U.S. Navy at Kansas City, Missouri.
- On April 17, 1919, he enlisted in the U.S. Coast Guard as a cook in Brooklyn, New York.
- On May 22, 1919, he enlisted in the U.S. Army at Columbus Barracks, Ohio, and was assigned to the finance office. On August 25 he was promoted to sergeant.
- On November 17, 1921, he enlisted in the U.S. Coast Guard and was assigned to the cutter Bear as a Mess Attendant 1st Class.

== Disappearance ==
An eyewitness reported seeing someone leaving Taylor's bungalow around the time he was murdered, but her description does not fully match Sands' appearance. The police considered Sands a strong suspect, but never issued a warrant for his arrest in connection with the murder. Sands reportedly quit a job in northern California and disappeared the day of the murder. Subsequent investigations turned up evidence he had likely been arrested previously for petty crimes and had apparently deserted from the United States Coast Guard. Sands was never found.

== See also ==
- List of fugitives from justice who disappeared
