= Gardner Hunting =

American screenwriter

Gardner Hunting (1872 - 1958) was an American editor, screenwriter, and author. He edited People's Magazine. From Michigan, he wrote Vicarion and other stories. In 1916, he contracted with Wharton Incorporated to be in charge of their film scenarios. In 1920, he formed the independent film production company Cayuga Pictures with partner James N. Naulty, through which they made If Women Only Knew (1920) and Scrambled Wives (1921).

Their Friendly Enemy is set in Pentwater, Michigan and is about two high school graduates who buy the local newspaper and become its editors.

== Bibliography ==
- A Hand in the Game 1911 Henry Holt and Company, New York 1911, also by Quinn & Boden Company. Illustrated by J. N. Marchand
- Touchdown-and after, Macmillan, New York, 1920
- The Vicarion, 1926
- Barry Dare and the mysterious box, A. L. Burt company, New York c. 1929
- Working with God: Awakening the Genii Within Your Mind, Unity School of Christianity, Kansas City, 1947(pa

== Selected filmography ==
- Paying the Price (1916)
- Redeeming Love (1916 film) (1916)
- The Scarlet Oath (1916)
- Husband and Wife (1916)
- Johnny Get Your Gun (1919) written by Lawrence Burke and Gardner Hunting
- If Women Only Knew (1920)
- Scrambled Wives (1921)
