= William Desmond Taylor =

Irish-American film director, actor, and murder victim (1872–1922)

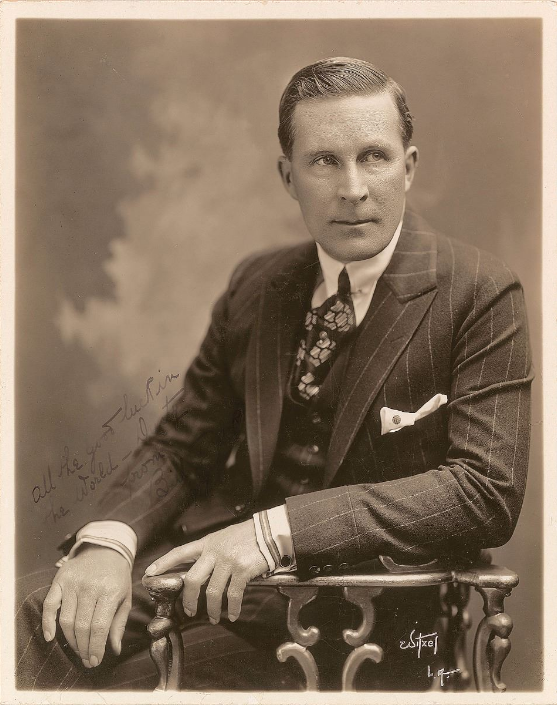
- Taylor in 1917
- Born: William Cunningham Deane-Tanner; 26 April 1872; Carlow, County Carlow, Ireland
- Died: 1 February 1922 (aged 49); Los Angeles, California, U.S.
- Cause of death: Homicide by gunshot
- Resting place: Hollywood Forever Cemetery
- Occupations: Director, actor
- Years active: 1913–1922
- Spouse: Ethel May Harrison (m. 1901; div. 1912)
- Partner: Neva Gerber (1914–1919)
- Children: 1
- Relatives: Denis Gage Deane-Tanner (brother)

William Desmond Taylor (born William Cunningham Deane-Tanner; 26 April 1872 – 1 February 1922) was an Anglo-Irish-American film director and actor. A popular figure in the growing Hollywood motion picture colony of the 1910s and early 1920s, Taylor directed fifty-nine silent films between 1914 and 1922 and acted in twenty-seven between 1913 and 1915.

Taylor's murder on 1 February 1922, along with other Hollywood scandals such as the Roscoe Arbuckle trial, led to a frenzy of sensationalist and often fabricated newspaper reports. The murder remains an official cold case.

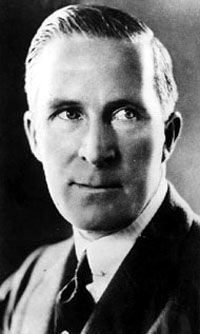
William Taylor

== Early life ==
Taylor (left) directing May McAvoy in the silent film Top of New York (1921), several months before his death

William Cunningham Deane-Tanner was born into the Anglo-Irish gentry on 26 April 1872, at Evington House, Carlow, County Carlow, Ireland, one of five children of a retired British Army officer, Major Thomas Kearns Deane-Tanner of the Carlow Rifles, 8th Battalion, King's Royal Rifle Corps, and his wife, Jane O'Brien. Taylor's siblings were Denis Gage Deane-Tanner, Ellen "Nell" Deane-Tanner Faudel-Phillips, Lizzie "Daisy" Deane-Tanner, and Oswald Kearns Deane-Tanner. One of his uncles was Charles Kearns Deane Tanner, the Irish Parliamentary Party Member of Parliament for Mid Cork.

From 1885 to 1887, Taylor attended Marlborough College in England. In 1891, he left Ireland for a dude ranch near Runnymede, Kansas, United States. There, Taylor became reacquainted with acting (his first experiences being at school) and eventually moved to New York City.

While in New York, Taylor courted Ethel May Hamilton, an actress who had appeared in the stage musical Florodora under the name Ethel May Harrison. Hamilton's father was a broker and an investor in the English antiques store on Fifth Avenue, the Antique Shoppe, which eventually employed Taylor. The couple married in an Episcopal ceremony on 7 December 1901 at the Little Church Around the Corner, and had a daughter, Ethel Daisy, in 1902 or 1903.

Taylor and his family were well-known in New York society and were members of several clubs. He was also a heavy drinker, possibly suffered from depression, and was known to carry on affairs with women. Taylor suddenly disappeared on 23 October 1908, deserting his wife and daughter. After his disappearance, friends said he had previously suffered "mental lapses", and his family thought initially he had wandered off during an episode of amnesia. Taylor's wife obtained a state decree of divorce in 1912.

Little is known of the years immediately following Taylor's disappearance. He travelled through Canada, Alaska and the northwestern U.S., mining gold and working with various acting troupes. Eventually, he switched from acting to producing. By the time he arrived in San Francisco, California around 1912, he had changed his name to William Desmond Taylor; in San Francisco, some New York acquaintances met him, and provided him with some money to re-establish himself in Los Angeles.

== Hollywood ==
Taylor's initial film acting was in 1913 for the New York Motion Picture Company, releasing under the brands of Bronco and Kay-Bee. His earliest known screen appearance was in The Counterfeiter. He then acted for Vitagraph Studios, including four appearances opposite Margaret "Gibby" Gibson, and Balboa Amusement Producing Company. At Balboa, Taylor met actress Neva Gerber with whom he became engaged until 1919. Gerber later recalled, "He was the soul of honour, a man of personal culture, education, and refinement. I have never known a finer or better man."

Taylor began directing films in 1914, beginning with The Judge's Wife for Balboa. After leaving Balboa he directed two films at Favorite Players Film Co. and then American Film Manufacturing Company, where he directed most of the 30-episode serial The Diamond from the Sky. In October 1915 he joined Pallas Pictures. A year later Pallas became a subsidiary of Famous Players–Lasky. Except for a month working at Fox Film Corporation in 1917, all of Taylor's subsequent films were directed for Famous Players–Lasky or its subsidiary companies.

Around 1915, Taylor made contact with a sister-in-law, Ada Brennan Deane-Tanner, wife of Taylor's younger brother Denis. A former British Army lieutenant and manager of a New York antiques business (separate from Hamilton's), Denis had also abandoned his wife and children, disappearing in 1912. Ada and her daughters moved to Monrovia, California, where Ada could be treated at the Pottinger Sanitorium for tuberculosis. Ada's sister, Lillian Pomeroy, was married to the sanitorium's physician in charge, Dr. John L. Pomeroy. This would become public after Taylor's murder, and the press descended upon the little town of Monrovia.

Towards the end of World War I, in July 1918, Taylor enlisted in the Canadian Expeditionary Force as a private. After training for four and a half months at Fort Edward, Nova Scotia, Taylor sailed from Halifax on a troop transport carrying 500 Canadian soldiers. They arrived at Hounslow Barracks, London on 2 December 1918.

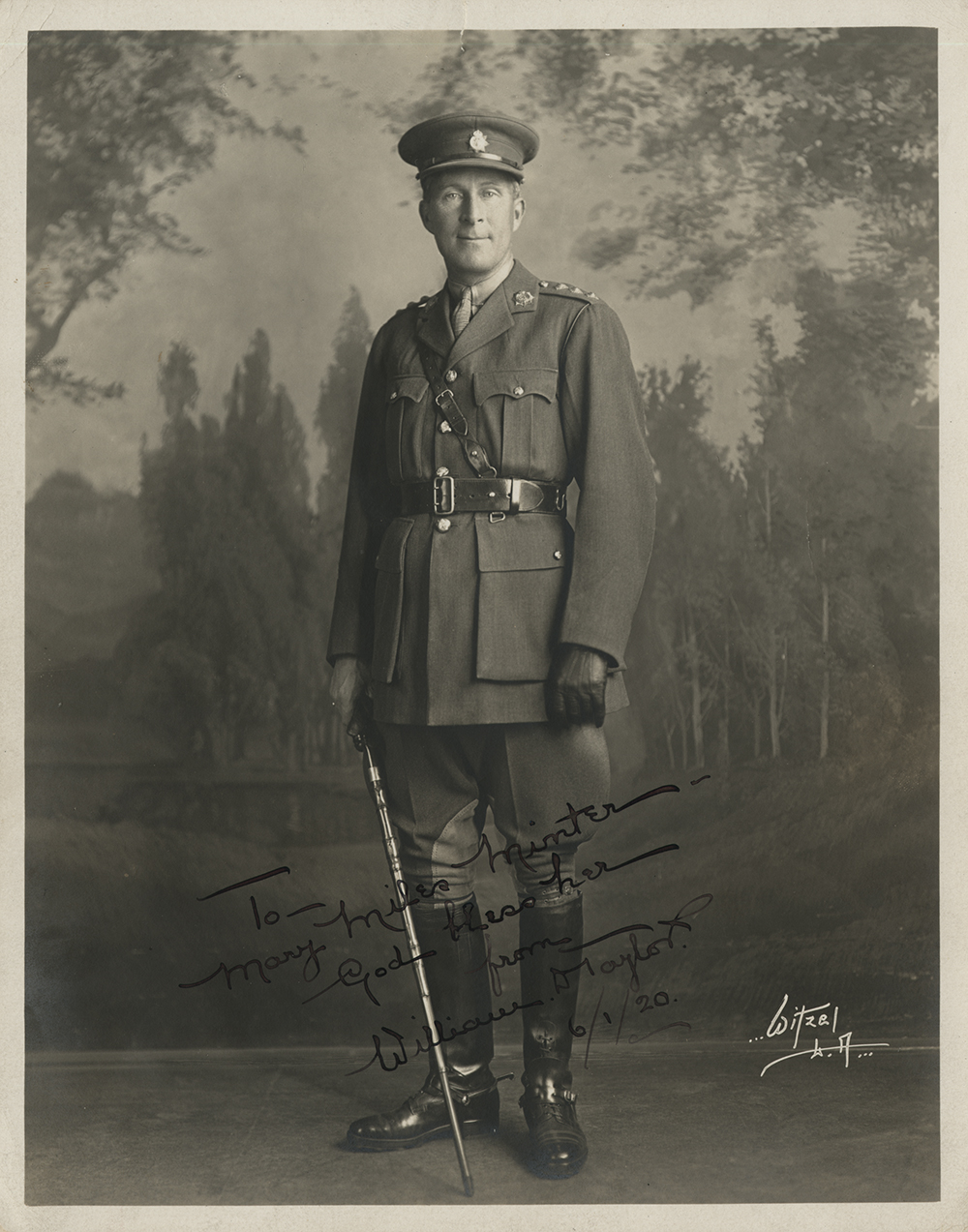
Taylor in a 1920 photograph addressed to actress Mary Miles Minter

Taylor was ultimately assigned to the Royal Army Service Corps of the Expeditionary Forces Canteen Service, stationed at Dunkirk, and promoted to the temporary grade of lieutenant on 15 January 1919. At the end of April 1919, Taylor reached his final billet at Bergues, France, as Major Taylor, Company D, Royal Fusiliers. Upon returning to Los Angeles on 14 May 1919, Taylor was honoured by the Motion Picture Directors Association with a formal banquet at the Los Angeles Athletic Club.

After returning from military service, Taylor went on to direct some of the most popular stars of the era, including Mary Pickford, Wallace Reid, Dustin Farnum and his protégée, Mary Miles Minter, who starred in the 1919 version of Anne of Green Gables. By this time, Taylor's ex-wife and daughter were aware that he was working in Hollywood. In 1918, while watching the film Captain Alvarez, they saw Taylor appear on the screen. Ethel responded, "That's your father!" In response, Ethel Daisy wrote Taylor in care of the studio. In 1921, Taylor visited his ex-wife and daughter in New York City and made Ethel Daisy his legal heir.

== Murder ==
At 7:30 on the morning of Thursday, 2 February 1922, Taylor's body was found inside his bungalow at the Alvarado Court Apartments, 404-B South Alvarado Street, in Westlake, Los Angeles. A crowd gathered inside, and someone identifying himself as a doctor stepped forward, made a cursory examination of the body, and declared Taylor had died of a stomach hemorrhage. The doctor was never seen again, and when doubts later arose, the body was rolled over by forensic investigators, revealing that the 49-year-old film director had been shot at least once in the back with what appeared to have been a small-caliber pistol, which was not found at the scene.

=== Funeral ===
Taylor's funeral took place on 7 February 1922, in St. Paul's Cathedral, Los Angeles. After an Episcopal ceremony, he was interred in a mausoleum at Hollywood Cemetery, now named Hollywood Forever Cemetery, on Santa Monica Boulevard. The inscription on his crypt reads, "In Memory of William C. Deane-Tanner, Beloved Father of Ethel Deane-Tanner. Died 1 February 1922."

== Investigation ==
In Taylor's pockets, investigators found a wallet holding US$78 in cash (modern day $1,500), a silver cigarette case, a Waltham pocket watch, a pen knife, and a locket bearing a photograph of actress Mabel Normand. A two-carat diamond ring was on his finger. With the evidence of the money and valuables on Taylor's body, robbery did not seem to be the motive for the killing, but a large sum of cash, that Taylor had shown to his accountant the day before, was missing and apparently never accounted for. After some investigation, the time of Taylor's death was set at 7:50 pm on the evening of 1 February 1922.

While being interviewed by the police five days after the director's body was found, Minter said that, following the murder, her friend, director and actor Marshall Neilan, had told her that Taylor had made several highly "delusional" statements about some of his social acquaintances (including her) during the weeks before his death. She also said that Neilan thought Taylor had recently become "insane".

In the midst of a media circus caused by the case, Los Angeles Undersheriff Eugene Biscailuz warned Chicago Tribune reporter Eddie Doherty, "The industry has been hurt. Stars have been ruined. Stockholders have lost millions of dollars. A lot of people are out of jobs and incensed enough to take a shot at you." According to Robert Giroux, "The studios seemed to be fearful that if certain aspects of the case were exposed, it would exacerbate their problems." King Vidor said of the case in 1968: "Last year I interviewed a Los Angeles police detective, William Michael Cahill Sr., now retired, who had been assigned to the case immediately after the murder. He told me, 'We were doing all right and then, before a week was out, we got the word to lay off.'"

=== Suspects and witnesses ===
==== Edward Sands ====
Edward F Sands

Edward F. Sands had prior convictions for embezzlement, forgery, and serial desertion from the U.S. military. Born in Ohio, he had multiple aliases and spoke with an affected cockney accent. Sands had worked as Taylor's valet and cook until seven months before the murder. While Taylor was in Europe the summer before in 1921, Sands had forged his name on cheques and wrecked his car. Later, Sands burgled Taylor's bungalow, leaving footprints on the film director's bed. Following the murder, Sands was never seen or heard from again.

==== Henry Peavey ====
Henry Peavey

Henry Peavey, who replaced Sands as Taylor's valet, was the person who found the body. Newspapers noted that Peavey wore flashy golf costumes, but did not own any golf clubs. Three days before Taylor's murder, Peavey had been arrested for "social vagrancy" and charged with being "lewd and dissolute".

According to Robert Giroux:

Even though the police decided, after severe questioning, that Peavey was not the murderer, the Hollywood correspondent of the New York Daily News, Florabel Muir, came to a private conclusion that Peavey was the murderer. In that era of ingenious women reporters, Muir thought she could engineer a scoop by tricking Peavey into a confession. She knew (from the movies) that blacks were deathly afraid of ghosts. With the help of two confederates, Frank Carson and Al Weinshank, she offered Peavey ten dollars if he would identify Taylor's grave in the Hollywood Park Cemetery (which she had already visited). Weinshank had gone on ahead with a white sheet, and Muir and Carson drove Peavey to the site. Weinshank, who came from a tough section of Chicago, spoke with the accents of a hoodlum. When he loomed up in the sheet and cried out, "I am the ghost of William Desmond Taylor. You murdered me. Confess, Peavey!" Henry laughed out loud, then cursed them roundly. Unfortunately for Muir, she was unaware that Taylor had a distinctive British accent. Weinshank, as Muir revealed in her memoirs, not only spoke like a hoodlum, but also was one of the alleged Chicago mobsters who were later gunned down in the infamous St. Valentine's Day Massacre.

A few months after the Taylor murder, Peavey left Los Angeles and moved to San Francisco. In 1930, he was admitted to the Napa State Hospital with general paresis due to an untreated case of syphilis. He died there of tertiary syphilis on December 27, 1931.

==== Mabel Normand ====
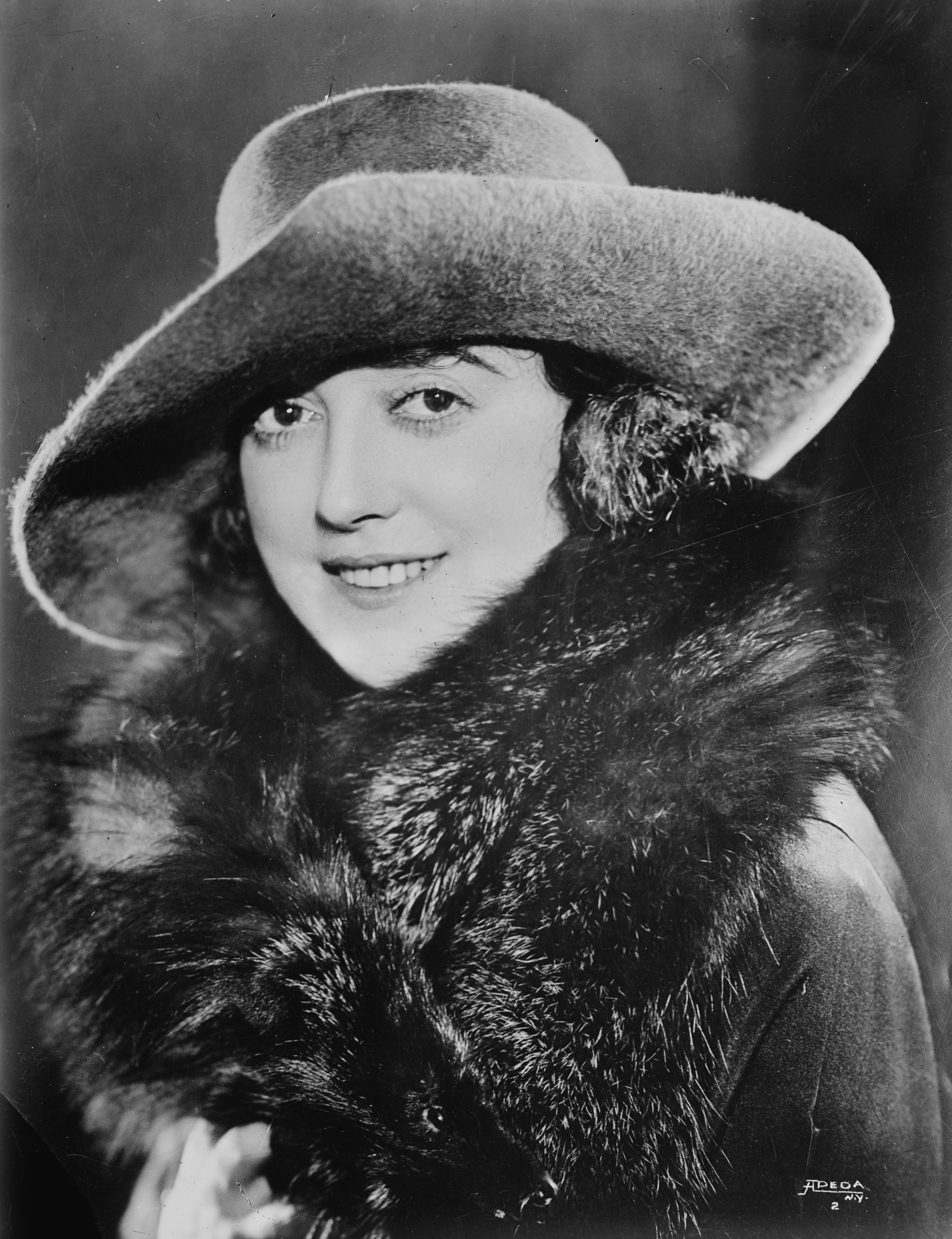
Mabel Normand

Mabel Normand was a popular comedic actress and frequent costar with Charlie Chaplin and Roscoe Arbuckle. According to author Robert Giroux, Taylor was deeply in love with Normand and she had originally approached him for help to cure her cocaine dependency. Based upon Normand's subsequent statements to police investigators, her repeated relapses were devastating for Taylor. According to Giroux, Taylor met with federal prosecutors shortly before his death and offered to testify against Normand's cocaine suppliers. Giroux believed that those suppliers learned of the meeting and hired a contract killer to assassinate the director. According to Giroux, Normand suspected the reasons for her lover's murder but did not know the identity of the triggerman.

On the night of the murder, Normand claimed to have left Taylor's bungalow in a happy mood at 7:45 pm, carrying a book he had lent her. She and Taylor blew kisses to each other as her limousine drove her away. Normand was the last person known to have seen Taylor alive, and the Los Angeles Police Department (LAPD) subjected her to a gruelling interrogation, but ruled her out as a suspect. Most subsequent writers have done the same. However, Normand's career had already slowed, and her reputation was tarnished by revelations of her addiction, which was seen as a moral failing. According to George Hopkins, who had a professional and intimate relationship with Taylor, Normand, who he sat next to, inconsolably wept throughout Taylor's funeral.

Ultimately, Normand continued to make films throughout the 1920s. She died of tuberculosis eight years later, on 23 February 1930. According to her friend and confidante Julia Brew, Normand asked her a few days before she died: "Julia, do you think they'll ever find out who killed Bill Taylor?"

==== Mary Miles Minter ====
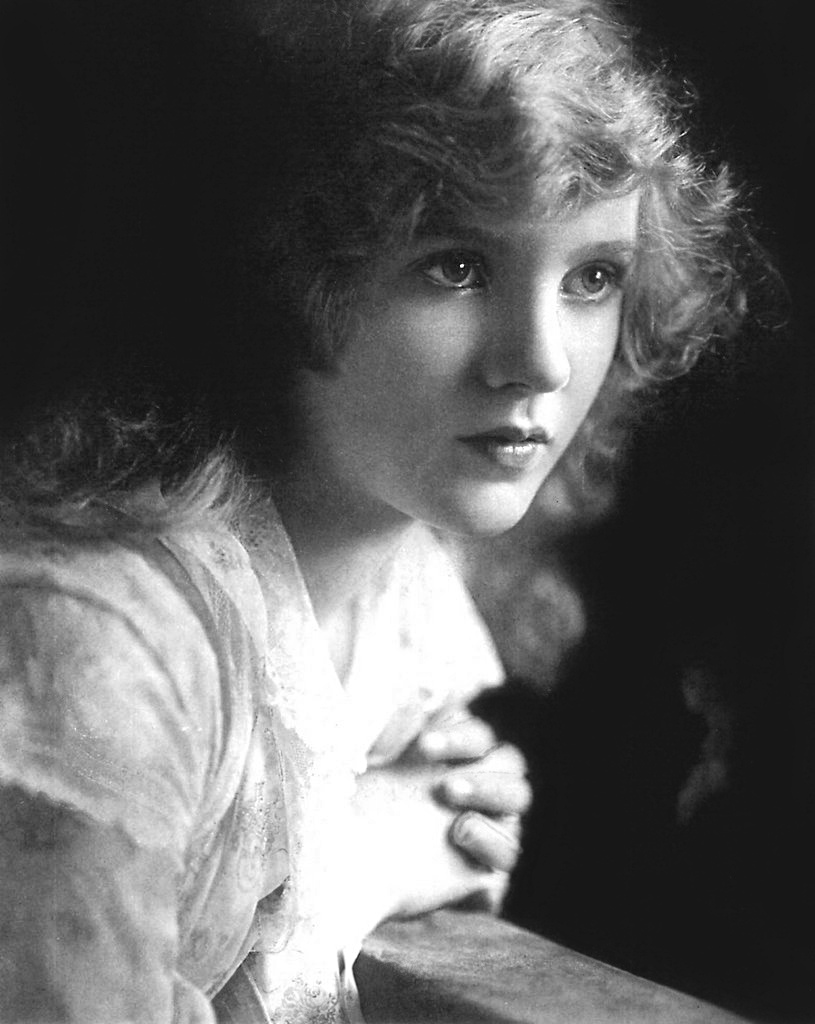
Mary Miles Minter

Mary Miles Minter was a former child star and teen screen idol whose career had been guided by Taylor. Minter, who had grown up without a father, was only three years older than the daughter Taylor had abandoned in New York. Love letters from Minter were found in Taylor's bungalow. Based upon those, reporters alleged that a sexual relationship between the 49-year-old Taylor and 19-year-old Minter had started when she was 17. Giroux and Vidor, however, disputed that allegation. Citing Minter's own statements, both believed that her love for Taylor was unrequited. Taylor had often declined to see Minter, and had described himself as too old for her.

However, facsimiles of Minter's passionate letters to Taylor were printed in newspapers, forever shattering her screen image as a modest and wholesome young girl, and she was vilified in the press. Minter made four more films for Paramount Pictures, and when the studio failed to renew her contract, she received offers from many other producers. Never comfortable as an actress, Minter declined them all. In 1957, she married Brandon O. Hildebrandt, a Danish-American businessman. She died in Santa Monica, California, on 4 August 1984.

==== Charlotte Shelby ====
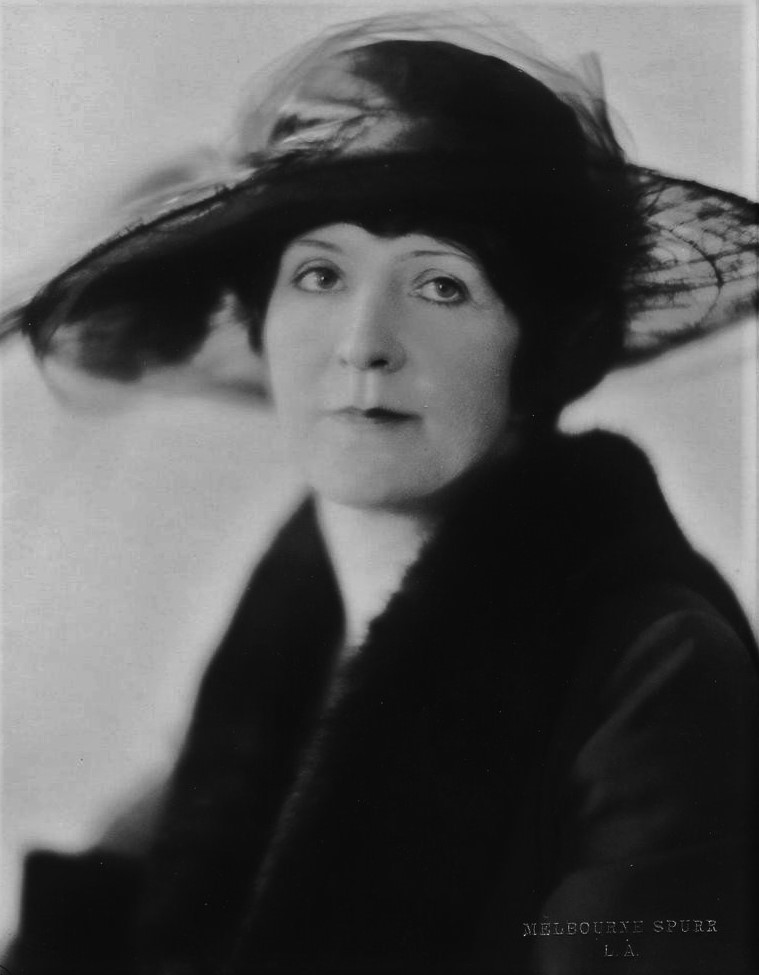
Charlotte Shelby

Charlotte Shelby was Minter's mother. Like many stage mothers before and since, she has been described as manipulative and consumed by wanton greed over her daughter's career. Minter and her mother were bitterly divided by financial disputes and lawsuits for a time, but they later reconciled. Shelby's initial statements to police about the murder are still characterized as evasive and "obviously filled with lies" about both her daughter's relationship with Taylor and "other matters". Perhaps the most compelling bit of circumstantial evidence was that Shelby allegedly owned a rare .38 calibre pistol and some unusual bullets, which were very similar to the kind which had killed Taylor. After that information became public, she reportedly threw the pistol into a Louisiana bayou.

Shelby knew the Los Angeles district attorney socially and spent years outside the United States, in an effort to avoid both official inquiries by his successor, and press coverage related to the murder. In 1938, her other daughter, actress Margaret Shelby (who was by then suffering from both clinical depression and alcoholism), openly accused her mother of the murder. Shelby was widely suspected of the crime and was a favourite suspect of many writers. For example, Adela Rogers St. Johns speculated that Shelby was torn by feelings of maternal protection for her daughter and her own attraction to Taylor.

Although Shelby feared being tried for the murder, at least two Los Angeles County district attorneys publicly declined to prosecute her. Almost twenty years after the murder, Los Angeles district attorney, Buron Fitts, concluded evidence was insufficient for an indictment of Shelby and recommended that the remaining evidence and case files be retained on a permanent basis. All of those materials subsequently disappeared. Shelby died in 1957. Fitts, in ill health, died by suicide in 1973.

==== Margaret Gibson ====
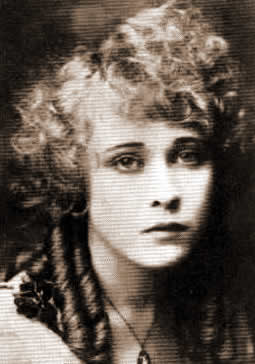
Margaret Gibson

Margaret Gibson was a film actress who had worked with Taylor when he first came to Hollywood. In 1917, she was indicted, tried, and acquitted on charges equivalent to prostitution (along with allegations of opium dealing), after which she changed her professional name to Patricia Palmer. In 1923, Gibson was arrested and jailed on extortion charges, which were later dropped. She was 27 years old and in Los Angeles at the time of Taylor's murder. No record of her name was ever mentioned in connection with the investigation. Soon after the murder, Gibson got work in a number of films produced by Famous Players–Lasky, Taylor's studio at the time of his death. Shortly before she died in 1964, Gibson reportedly confessed to murdering Taylor.

=== Lack of evidence ===
Through a combination of poor crime scene management and apparent corruption, much physical evidence was immediately lost, and the rest vanished over the years, although copies of a few documents from the police files were made public in 2007. Various theories were put forward after the murder, and in the years since, and many books published, claiming to have identified the murderer, but no conclusive evidence has ever been uncovered linking the crime to any particular individual.

== Aftermath ==
Because so many of the celebrities mentioned in the Taylor case were familiar to the public through their movie performances, this was the first American murder in which so many people felt such a personal interest. Public interest in the case resulted in stories about the Taylor murder selling more newspapers in the United States than ever before.

Anti-Hollywood sentiment peaked in the weeks following the Taylor murder, with editorials comparing Hollywood to "all the licentiousness that marked the Roman times of Caligula, Claudius, and Nero," "our American Sodom and Gomorrah," and sounding the call to "Destroy Hollywood!" Other editorials characterized Taylor as a crafty, cultured villain who "got what was coming to him," and urging, "Every weapon available should be used by all the forces of law to defeat the conspiracy to cover up the Taylor case."

A spate of newspaper-driven Hollywood scandals during the early 1920s included Taylor's murder, the Roscoe Arbuckle trial, the death of Olive Thomas, the mysterious death of Thomas H. Ince, and the drug- or alcohol-related deaths of Wallace Reid, Barbara La Marr, and Jeanne Eagels, all of which prompted Hollywood studios to begin writing contracts with "morality clauses" or "moral turpitude clauses", allowing the dismissal of contractees who breached them.

== In popular culture ==
- The film Sunset Boulevard (1950), with William Holden and Gloria Swanson, features a fictional, ageing silent screen actress named "Norma Desmond", whose name was taken from Taylor's middle name and Mabel Normand's last name, as a way to resonate with the widely publicized scandals of almost 30 years before.
- The film Hollywood Story (1951), an attempt by Universal Pictures to take advantage of the success of Sunset Boulevard, is clearly based directly on the Taylor murder. While the film reaches a fictional conclusion, it follows the circumstances of the real-life event closely.
- Gore Vidal's novel Hollywood (1990) features a fictionalised account of the Taylor murder. Other novels that fictionalize the case include 13 Castle Walk by DeWitt Bodeen (1975), The Man Who Died Twice by Samuel A. Peeples (1976), and Running Time by Gavin Lambert (1982).
- Taylor's murder was depicted in David Merrick's production of the Jerry Herman - Michael Stewart "cult" musical Mack & Mabel, which opened on Broadway at the Majestic Theatre on 6 October 1974, and ran for six previews and 66 regular performances. Directed and choreographed by Gower Champion, the production starred Robert Preston as Mack Sennett and Bernadette Peters as Mabel Normand, with James Mitchell portraying William Desmond Taylor.

== Career as director ==
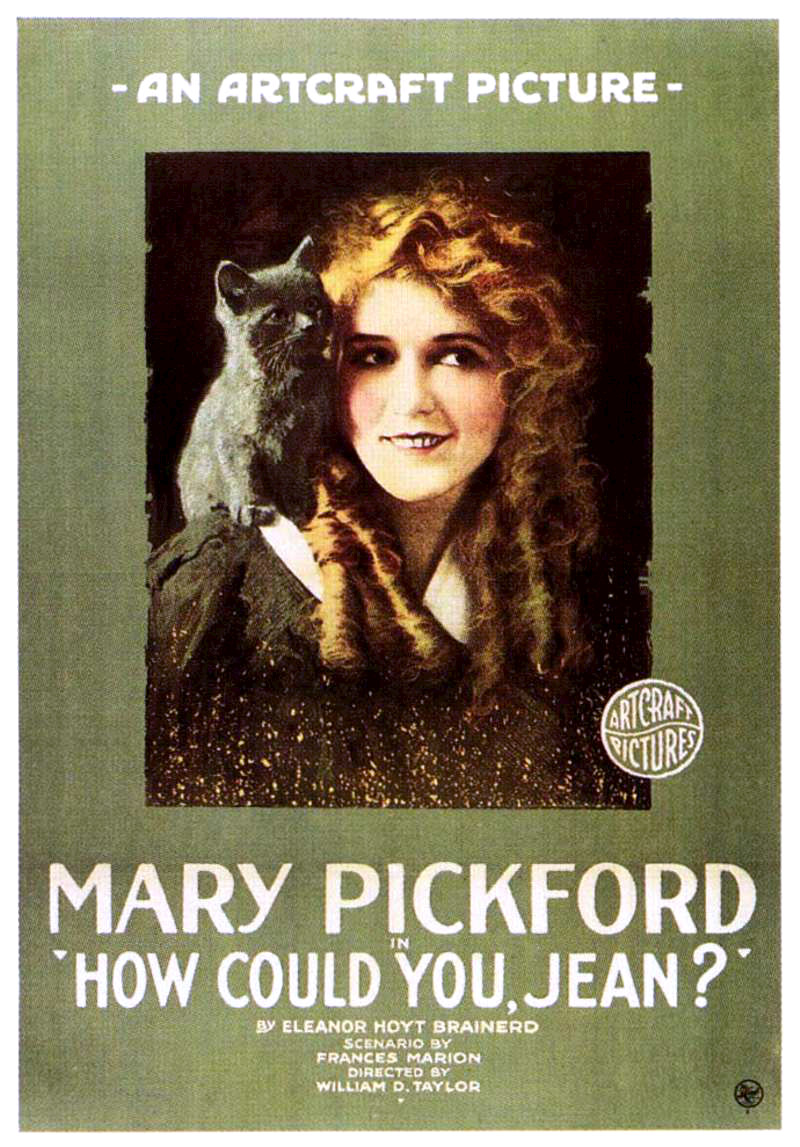
Poster for How Could You, Jean? starring Mary Pickford (1918)

Taylor directed more than 60 films. These include:

- The Diamond From the Sky (1915; *co-directed with Jacques Jaccard)
- A Woman Scorned (1915)
- He Fell in Love with His Wife (1916)
- Ben Blair (1916)
- The Heart of Paula (1916; *co-directed with friend Julia Crawford Ivers)
- Pasquale (1916)
- The American Beauty (1916)
- Davy Crockett (1916)
- The Parson of Panamint (1916)
- The House of Lies (1916)
- Her Father's Son (1916)
- Redeeming Love (1916)
- Happiness of Three Women (1917)
- Out of the Wreck (1917)
- The World Apart (1917)
- Big Timber (1917)
- The Varmint (1917)
- Jack and Jill (1917)
- Tom Sawyer (1917)
- The Spirit of '17 (1918)
- Huck and Tom (1918)
- Up the Road with Sallie (1918)
- His Majesty, Bunker Bean (1918)
- Mile-a-Minute Kendall (1918)
- How Could You, Jean? (1918) with Mary Pickford
- Johanna Enlists (1918) with Mary Pickford
- Captain Kidd, Jr. (1919) with Mary Pickford
- Anne of Green Gables (1919) with Mary Miles Minter
- Huckleberry Finn (1920)
- Judy of Rogue's Harbor (1920) with Mary Miles Minter
- Nurse Marjorie (1920) with Mary Miles Minter
- Jenny Be Good (1920) with Mary Miles Minter
- The Soul of Youth (1920)
- The Furnace (1920)
- The Witching Hour (1921)
- Sacred and Profane Love (1921)
- Wealth (1921)
- Beyond (1921)
- Morals (1921)
- The Green Temptation (1922) (released posthumously)
- The Top of New York (1922) (released posthumously)

== See also ==
- List of unsolved murders (1900–1979)
