= Lucille Ward =

American actress (1880–1952)

- Born: February 25, 1880; Dayton, Ohio, US
- Died: August 8, 1952 (aged 72); Dayton, Ohio, US
- Years active: 1915–1944
- Spouse: Chauncey Smith

Lucille Ward (February 25, 1880 – August 8, 1952) was an American film actress. She appeared in more than 140 films between 1915 and 1944. She was born and died in Dayton, Ohio.

Ward's career began in 1907 when she acted in a production of Monte Cristo in New York. After a dozen years of performing in musical comedies, stock theater, and vaudeville, Ward began acting in films.

Ward was married to Chauncey Smith, who died in 1949.

== Selected filmography ==
- The Quest (1915) - Mrs. Chalmers - the Hostess
- The Lonesome Heart (1915) - Sarah Prue
- The Girl from His Town (1915) - Minor Role
- Infatuation (1915) - Mrs. Fenshaw
- The Miracle of Life (1915) - Mrs. Gerald Fels-Martine
- The House of Lies (1916) - Mrs. Coleman
- Her Father's Son (1916) - Mammy Chloe
- The Road to Love (1916) - Lella Sadiya
- My Fighting Gentleman (1917)
- How Could You, Jean? (1918)
- Beauty and the Rogue (1918)
- The Amateur Adventuress (1919)
- The Island of Intrigue (1919)
- The Thirteenth Commandment (1920)
- Smoldering Embers (1920)
- The Cheater (1920)
- Travelling Salesman (1921)
- The Woman He Loved (1922)
- East Side - West Side (1923)
- Sporting Youth (1924)
- The Girl in the Limousine (1924)
- Oh Doctor! (1925)
- His Majesty, Bunker Bean (1925)
- A Woman of the World (1925)
- California Straight Ahead (1925)
- What a Man! (1930)
- The Public Enemy (1931)
- Marriage on Approval (1933)
- The Big Bluff (1933)
- Bengal Tiger (1936)
- Hideaway (1937)
- Sons of the Legion (1938)
- First Love (1939)
