= Don't Get Personal (1922 film) =

1922 film by Clarence G. Badger

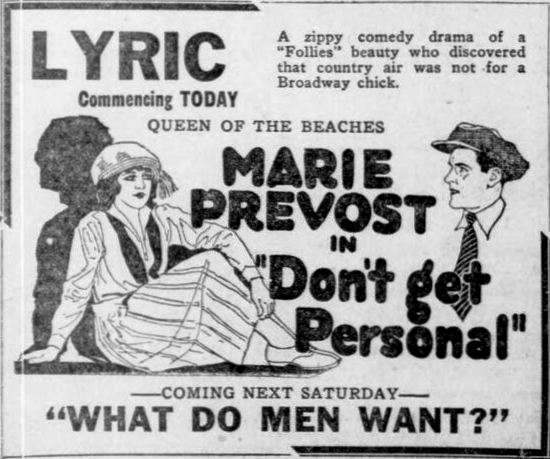
- Directed by: Clarence G. Badger
- Written by: Irving Cummings; Doris Schroeder
- Produced by: Carl Laemmle
- Starring: Marie Prevost; George Nichols; Daisy Jefferson
- Cinematography: Milton Moore
- Production company: Universal Pictures
- Distributed by: Universal Pictures
- Release date: January 16, 1922
- Country: United States
- Languages: Silent; English intertitles

Don't Get Personal is a 1922 American silent comedy film directed by Clarence G. Badger and starring Marie Prevost, George Nichols and Daisy Jefferson.

== Cast ==
- Marie Prevost as Patricia Parker
- George Nichols as Silas Wainwright
- Daisy Jefferson as Emily Wainwright
- Roy Atwell as Horace Kane
- T. Roy Barnes as John Wainwright
- Del Lorice as Maisie Morrison
- Sadie Gordon as Arabella New
- Alida B. Jones as Jane New
- Ralph McCullough as Jimmie Barton

== Preservation ==
With no prints of Don't Get Personal located in any film archives, it is considered a lost film.

== Bibliography ==
- Munden, Kenneth White. The American Film Institute Catalog of Motion Pictures Produced in the United States, Part 1. University of California Press, 1997.
