= The Redeeming Sin (1925 film) =

1925 film

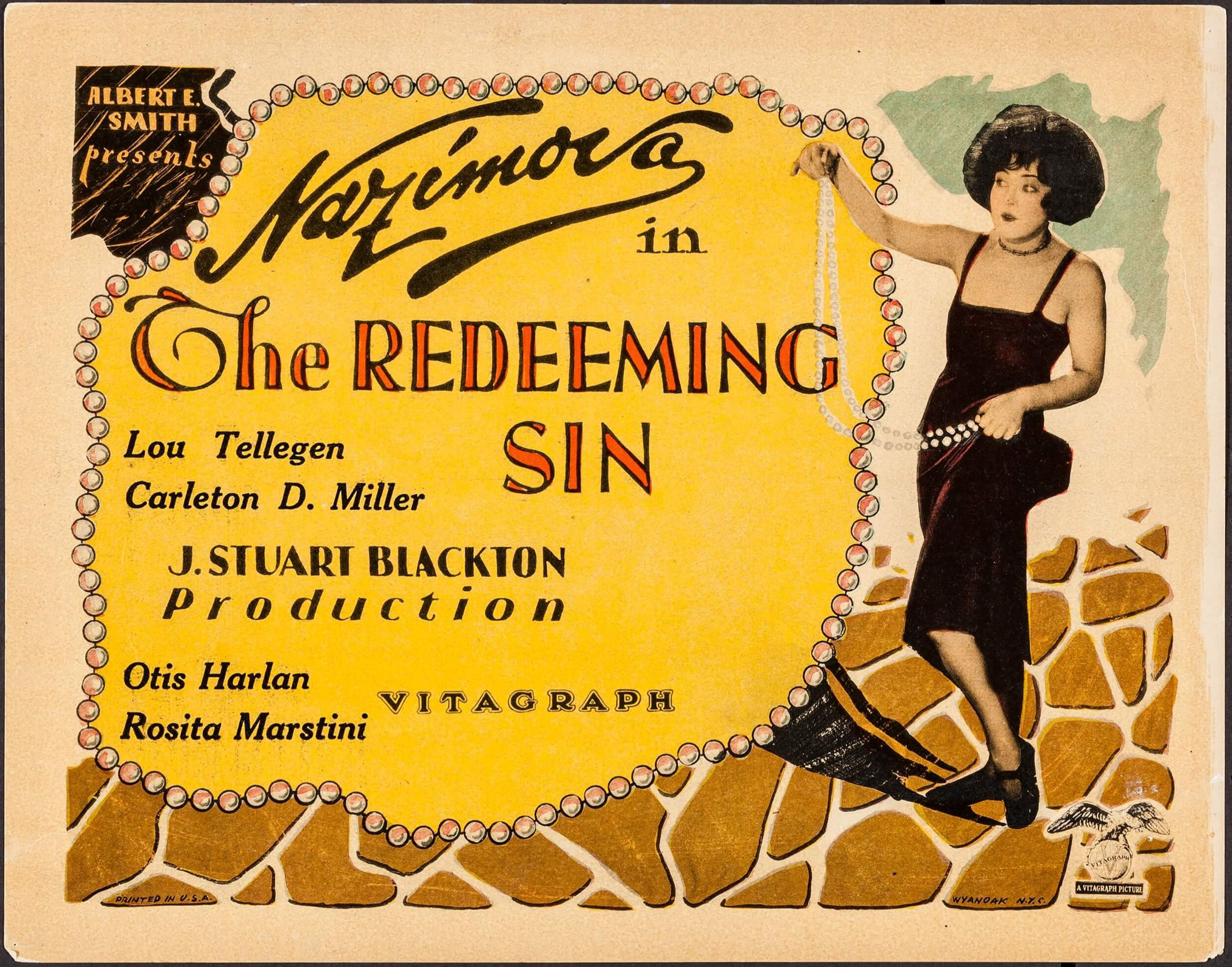
- Lobby Card
- Directed by: J. Stuart Blackton
- Written by: Marian Constance Blackton
- Based on: "The Redeeming Sin" (short story) by L. V. Jefferson
- Produced by: Albert E. Smith
- Starring: Alla Nazimova; Lou Tellegen
- Cinematography: L. William O'Connell
- Distributed by: Vitagraph Company of America
- Release date: January 25, 1925
- Running time: 7 reels
- Country: United States
- Language: Silent (English intertitles)

The Redeeming Sin is a 1925 American silent drama film directed by J. Stuart Blackton and starring Alla Nazimova. It was produced and distributed by the Vitagraph Company of America. The story was remade in 1929 by Warner Bros. (the later purchaser of Vitagraph) as The Redeeming Sin starring Dolores Costello.

== Plot ==
As described in a review in a film magazine, Joan, member of a band of Apache thieves, resents the attention of Lupin, their leader. She leaves and goes to the café of Papa ChuChu, where a bunch of aristocrats see her dancing. One of them, Paul Dubois, is attracted to her. Lupin, jealous, waits outside to take her back, but she remains in the café all night. The next morning she meets Paul and tells him she wants to become a lady; he fastidiously suggests things that will help her and she takes him seriously. Later he is impressed by her earnestness and becomes interested in her, and she falls in love with him. One day she sees him attentive to another woman and becomes so jealous that she returns to Lupin and tells him of a statue of the Madonna with a pearl necklace that Paul's mother is giving the church, and makes him promise to that he will get the pearls and kill Paul. She is to give the signal, but discovers that the girl is Paul's sister. It is too late to stop Lupin. For days she broods, and Lupin, who loves her blindly, takes back the pearls, but he is wounded by one of his followers. In the church Joan sees Paul and is overjoyed that he was only slightly injured. However, the sight of the wounded Lupin brings her to the realization that it is Lupin that she really loves.

== Cast ==
- Alla Nazimova as Joan
- Lou Tellegen as Lupin
- Carl Miller as Paul Dubois
- Otis Harlan as Papa ChuChu
- Rosita Marstini as Mere Michi
- William R. Dunn as Gaston
- Rose Tapley as Marquise

unbilled

- Italia Frandi
- Venezia Frandi

== Preservation ==
With no prints of The Redeeming Sin located in any film archives, it is a lost film.
