= Homer Scott =

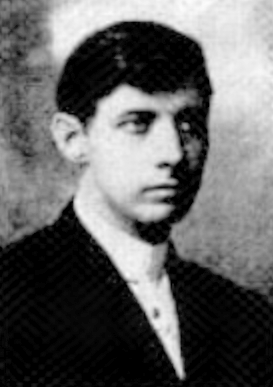
- Born: Homer Almariam Scott; October 1, 1880; New York City, New York
- Died: December 23, 1956 (aged 76); Sacramento, California
- Burial place: East Lawn Memorial Park
- Occupation: Cinematographer
- Title: ASC Founding Member (President 1925–1926)
- Spouse: Mabel L. Upper

Homer A. Scott (October 1, 1880 – December 23, 1956) was a founding member of the American Society of Cinematographers (A.S.C.) and was their president from 1925-1926. He was also a member and director of its predecessor organization, The Static Club of America.

== Mexican Revolution ==
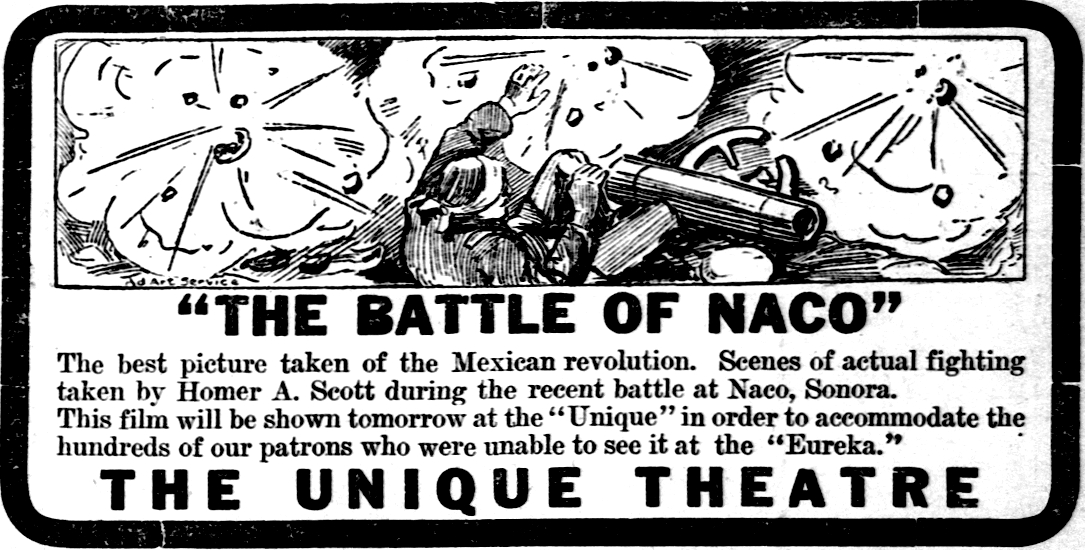
Newspaper ad for a 2-reel 1913 Mexican Revolution documentary filmed by Homer Scott

Little is known of Homer Scott's early work before 1911-1912, when he made several trips from El Paso, Texas into Mexico to photograph and film both sides of the Mexican Revolution. His war photographs were syndicated by Newspaper Enterprise Association, and he also furnished images for the New York Herald, Collier's, and Leslie's Weekly. During one trip, Scott was arrested and nearly executed as a spy. His work is in major collections including the Getty Images and was included in an exhibition titled "Mexico: Photography and Revolution" in 2011 in Mexico City.

He also worked as a staff photographer for the El Paso Herald. In August 1912, Scott traveled to Buffalo, NY, to attend the funeral of his father, William W. Scott, then returned to El Paso.

== Early movies ==
News items from December 1913 indicate Scott was filming with Buck Connors at Fort Bliss, Texas for the newly formed Albuquerque Film Company Perhaps the film was The First Law of Nature, a 3-reel film with Dot Farley and Buck Connors which was the Albuquerque Company's first release. Scott's first known cinematography work in Southern California was The Key to Yesterday for Carlyle Blackwell's Favorite Players Film Company in 1914. Scott filmed the four features produced by that company before the company folded in 1915.

For three years Homer Scott was closely associated with director William Desmond Taylor. Scott and Taylor both went from Favorite Players, to American Film, to Pallas-Morosco, to Fox, and back to Pallas-Morosco (which had been absorbed by Famous Players–Lasky). Their collaboration lasted from 1915-1918.

Scott freelanced for several years, and in 1920 filmed noted underwater scenes in Annette Kellerman's What Women Love (1920) and Maurice Tourneur's Deep Waters (1920).

In 1921 Mack Sennett hired Scott as cameraman for Mabel Normand, and Scott filmed her features Molly O (1921), Suzanna (1923), and The Extra Girl (1923), plus other features for Sennett.

== Shooting for the Warner Bros. ==
In 1923 Scott filmed Little Church Around the Corner, Main Street, and Where the North Begins for Warner Brothers.

== Later life ==
Scott's name has not been found in the credits of feature films after 1923, but trade publications and publicity items indicate he did camerawork for The Lost World (1925), Tiger Shark (1932), Bird of Paradise (1932), and Below the Sea (1933). Harold Lloyd has indicated Scott worked for him as second cameraman.

Scott moved to a ranch near Newcastle, California in the mid-1930s, and resided there until his death in Sacramento on December 23, 1956. He was buried at East Lawn Memorial Park.

== Selected filmography ==
- Davy Crockett (1916)
- Big Timber (1917)
- The Light of Western Stars (1918)
- Main Street (1923)
- The Extra Girl (1923)
