= Howard Hawks filmography =

Howard Hawks (1896–1977) was an American film director who made 40 films between 1926 and 1970. He is responsible for classic films in genres including film noir, screwball comedy, crime, science fiction, and Western.

== Films directed ==
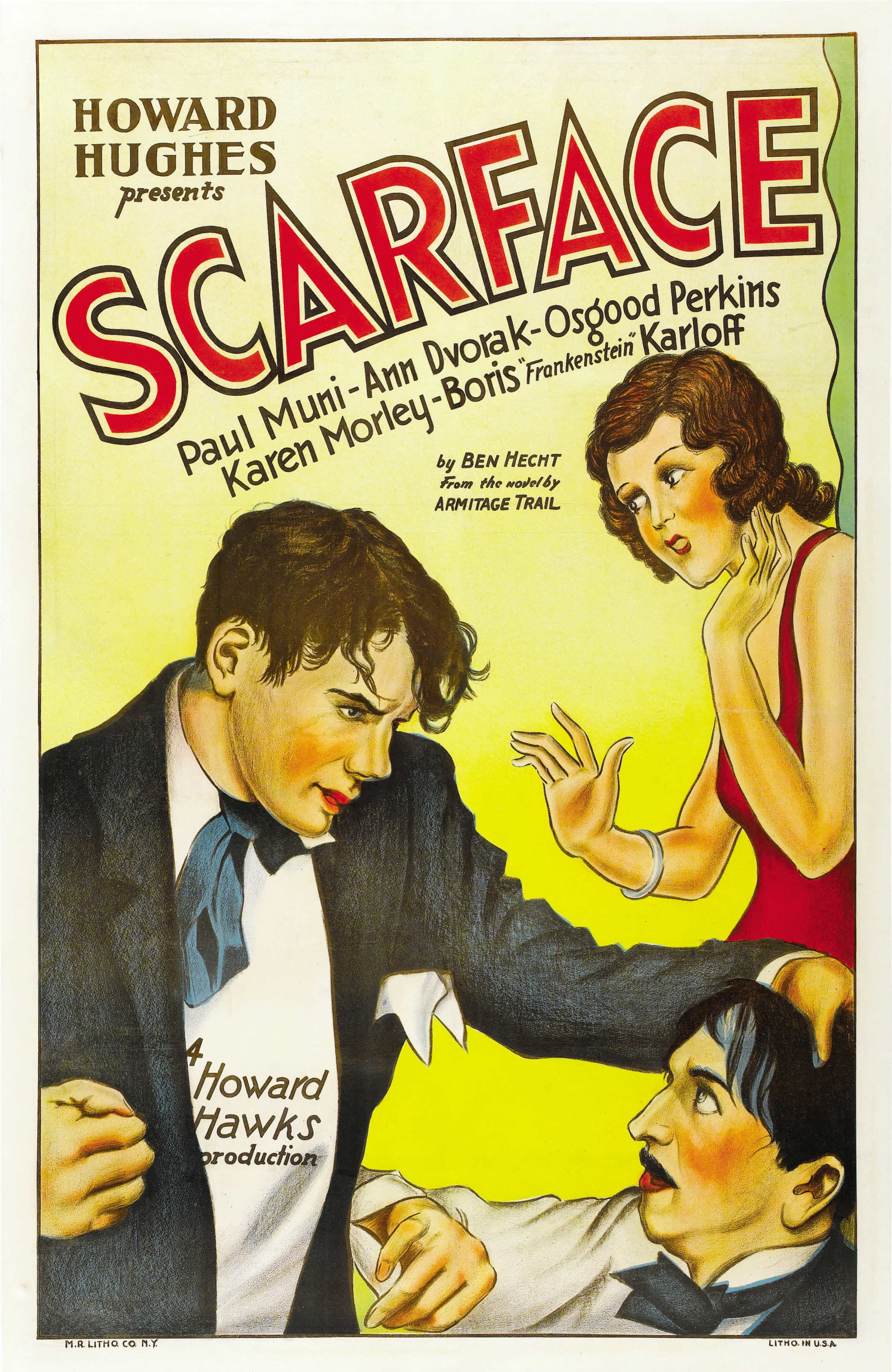
Theatrical poster for the release of Scarface (1932).

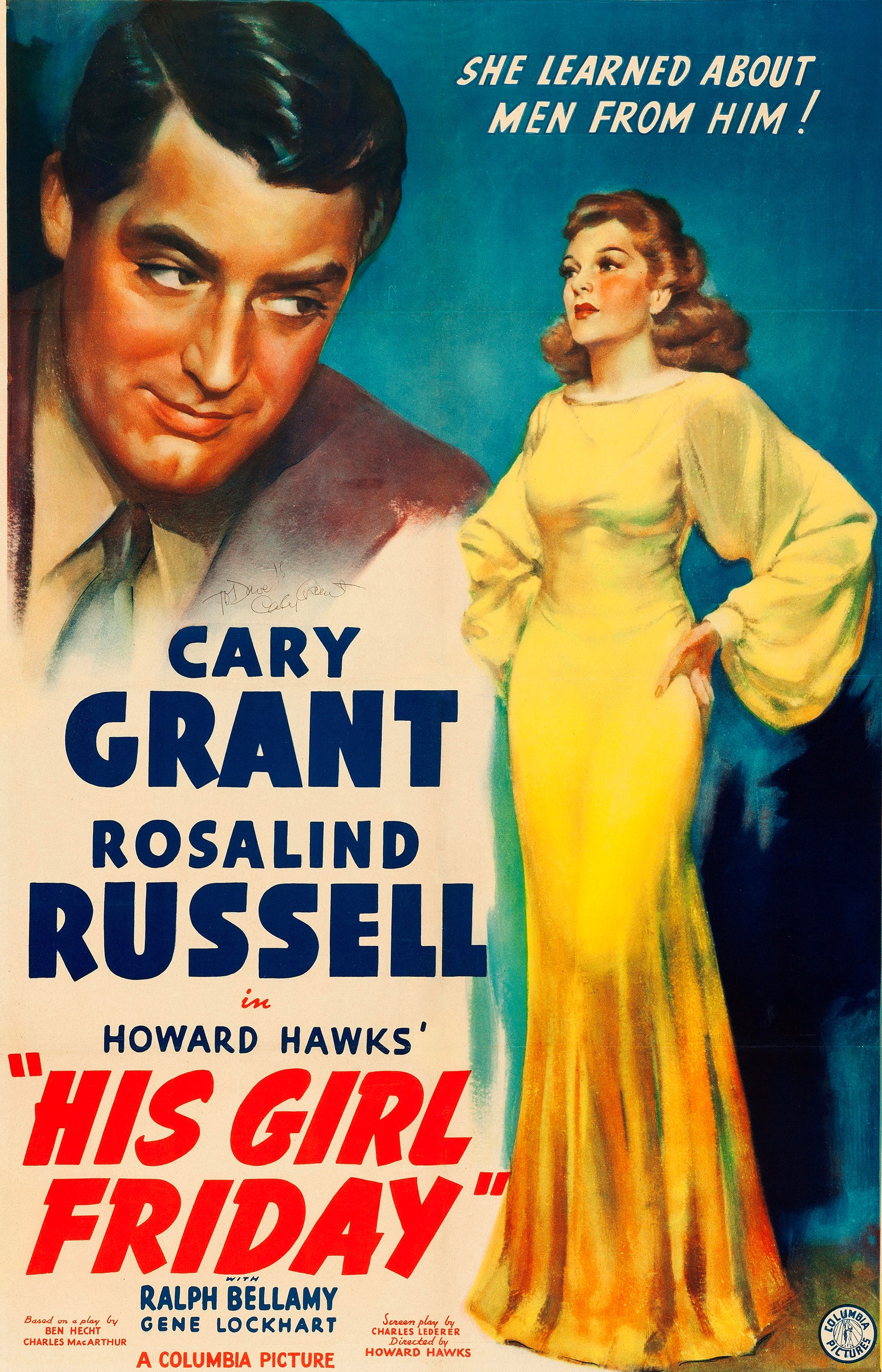
Theatrical poster for the American release of the 1940 film His Girl Friday.

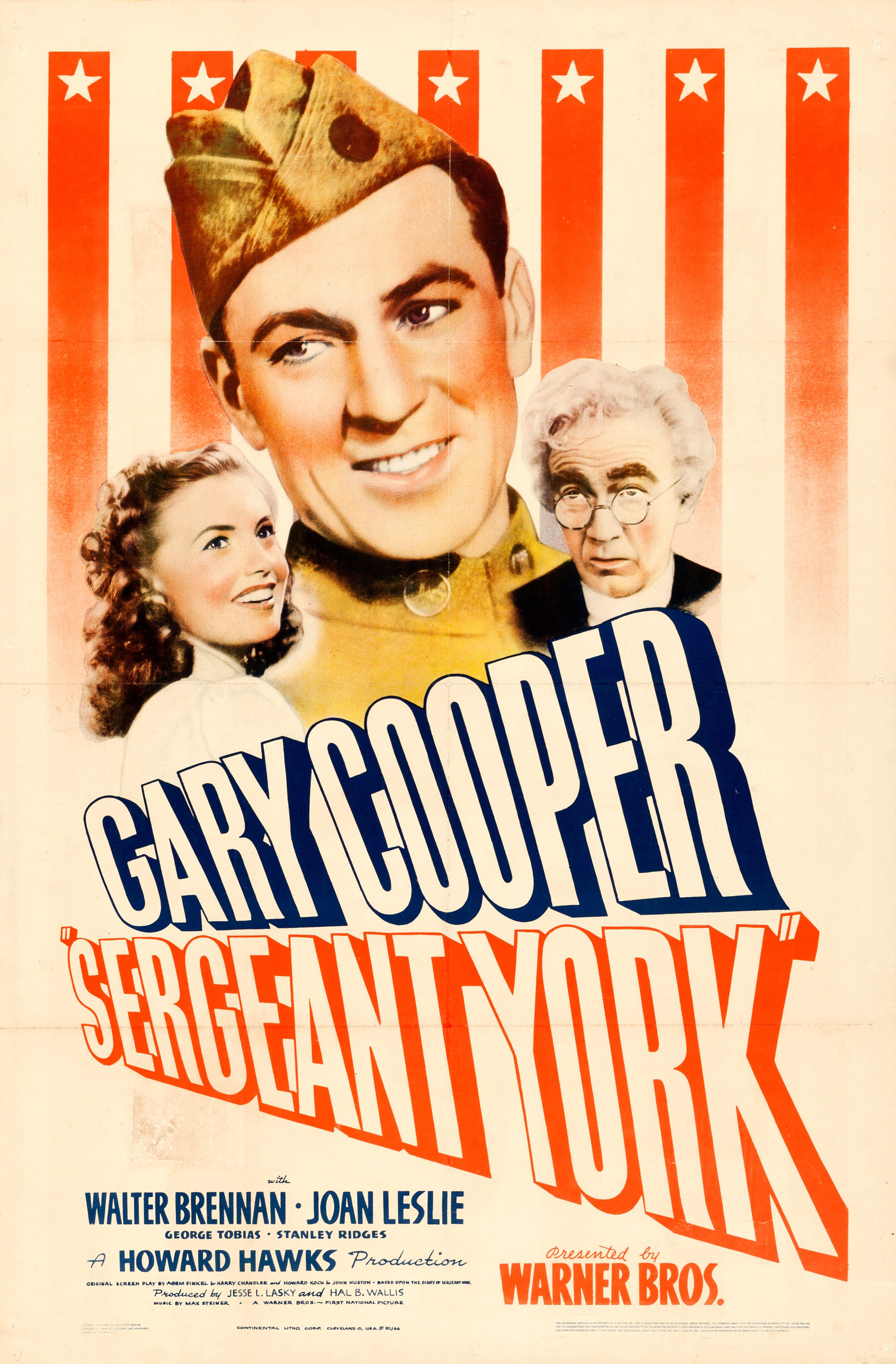
Theatrical release poster for the 1941 film Sergeant York.

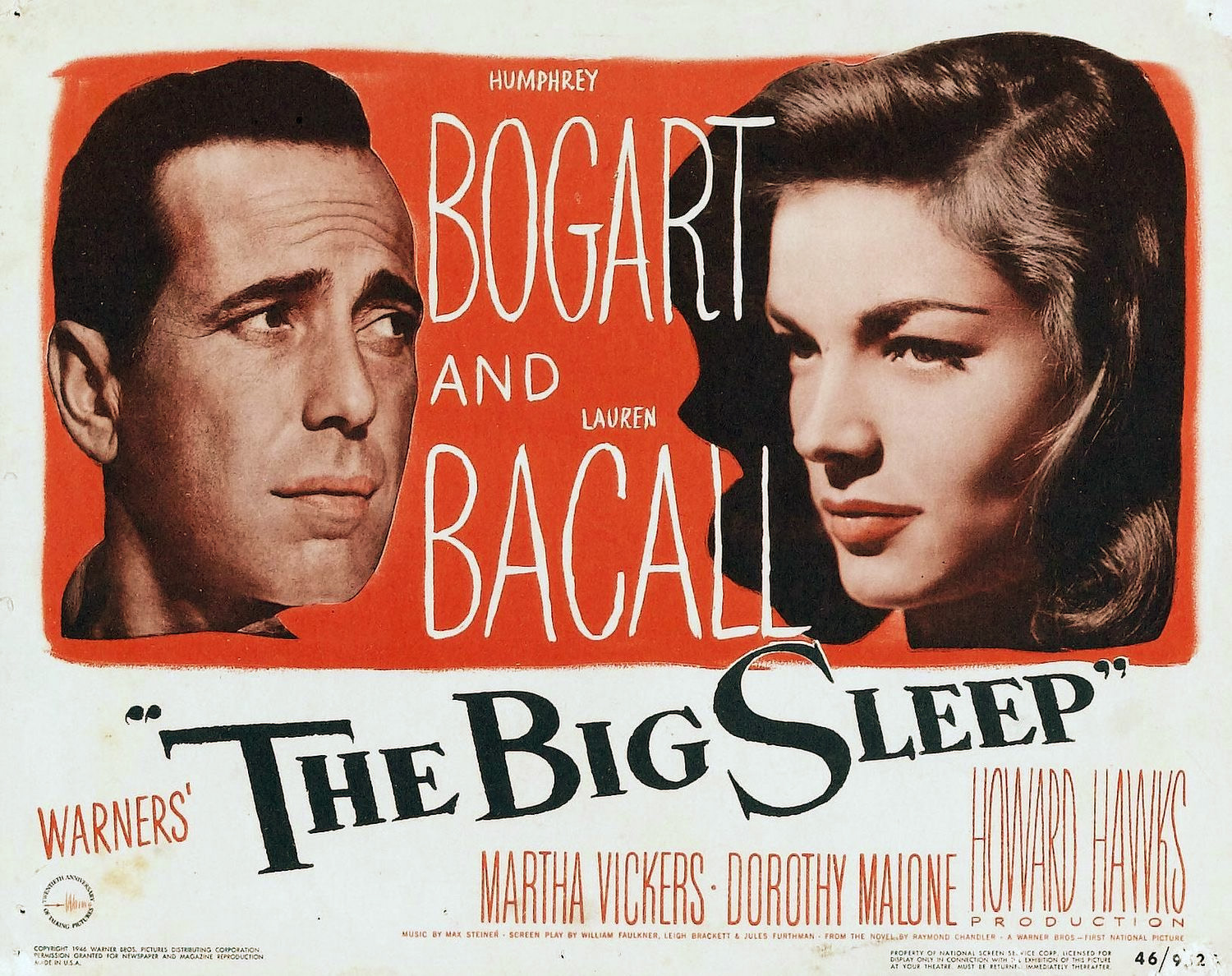
Theatrical poster for the American film The Big Sleep (1946).

Year	Title	Notes	Other roles
Silent films
1926	The Road to Glory	Lost film	Writer
1926	Fig Leaves	Colour scenes included	Writer
1927	The Cradle Snatchers	Partially lost	
1927	Paid to Love		
1928	A Girl in Every Port		Writer
1928	Fazil		
1929	Trent's Last Case		
Sound films
1928	The Air Circus	Co-directed with Lewis Seiler / Lost film	
1930	The Dawn Patrol		Writer
1931	The Criminal Code		Producer
1932	Scarface	Co-directed with Richard Rosson	Producer, Writer
1932	The Crowd Roars		Writer
1932	Tiger Shark		
1933	Today We Live	Co-directed with Richard Rosson	
1934	Twentieth Century		Producer
1935	Barbary Coast		
1936	Ceiling Zero		
1936	The Road to Glory		
1936	Come and Get It	Co-directed with William Wyler	
1938	Bringing Up Baby		Producer
1939	Only Angels Have Wings		Producer
1940	His Girl Friday		Producer
1941	Sergeant York		Producer
1941	Ball of Fire		
1943	Air Force		Producer
1944	To Have and Have Not		Producer
1946	The Big Sleep		Producer
1948	Red River	2nd unit director Arthur Rosson	Producer & Presenter
1948	A Song Is Born	First Technicolor film	
1949	I Was a Male War Bride		
1952	The Big Sky		Producer
1952	Monkey Business		
1952	"Ransom of Red Chief"	from O. Henry's Full House	
1953	Gentlemen Prefer Blondes	Technicolor film	
1955	Land of the Pharaohs	Technicolor film	Producer
1959	Rio Bravo	Technicolor film	Producer
1962	Hatari!	Technicolor film	Producer & Presenter
1964	Man's Favorite Sport?	Technicolor film	Producer
1965	Red Line 7000	Technicolor film	Producer, Writer
1966	El Dorado	Similar idea to Rio Bravo / Technicolor film	Producer & Presenter
1970	Rio Lobo	Similar idea to Rio Bravo / Technicolor film / Final film Hawks directed	Producer

== Films produced only ==
Year	Title	Genre	Cast	Studio	Notes
1943	Corvette K-225	War	Randolph Scott, Ella Raines, Barry Fitzgerald	Universal Pictures	producer, directed by Richard Rosson
1951	The Thing from Another World	Science fiction	Kenneth Tobey, Robert Cornthwaite, Dewey Martin	Winchester Pictures	producer, directed by Christian Nyby

== Documentary appearances ==
Year	Title	Notes
1967	Cinema	episode: "Howard Hawks"
1970	Plimpton! Shoot-Out at Rio Lobo	making-of documentary
1972	The Men Who Made the Movies: Howard Hawks	documentary
1977	Hollywood Greats	episode: "Humphrey Bogart"

== Unfinished projects ==
Year	Title	Notes
1932	La foule hurle	French-language version of The Crowd Roars directed by John Daumery, featuring footage from Hawks film
1933	The Prizefighter and the Lady	resigned, replaced by W.S. Van Dyke
1934	Viva Villa!	resigned, replaced by Jack Conway
1943	The Outlaw	resigned, replaced by Howard Hughes
