= The Road to Glory =

The Road to Glory may refer to:

- The Road to Glory (1936 film), an American war drama film
- The Road to Glory (1926 film), an American silent drama film
