= William R. Dunn (actor) =

American actor (1888–1946)

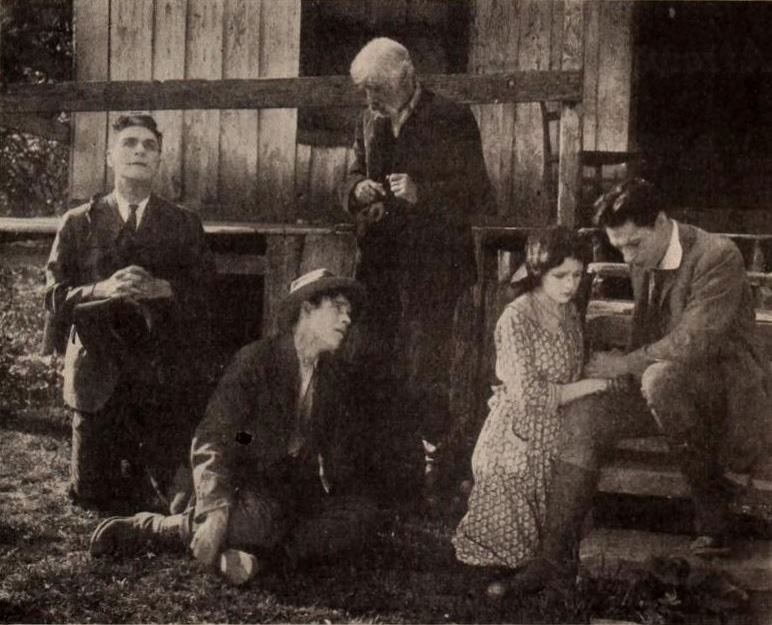
- Still from the American drama film The Forbidden Valley (1920) with Warren Chandler, William R. Dunn, Charles Kent, May McAvoy, and Bruce Gordon
- Born: May 23, 1888; Astoria, New York
- Died: March 24, 1946 (aged 57); Los Angeles, California
- Occupation: Actor
- Spouse: Sabel Johnson Dunn
- Children: 1

William R. Dunn (May 23, 1888 – March 24, 1946) was an American actor on film and stage and in vaudeville.

Dunn was born in Astoria, Long Island, the son of William R. Dunn, a ferry captain, and Martha Wentz. He had two brothers, Eddie and Stanley, who were also actors. He graduated from public schools there.

Dunn debuted as an actor in 1900 with the Corse Payton Stock Company in Brooklyn. He went on to perform in vaudeville.

He appeared along Mary Maurice, Earle Williams, James Morrison, Robert Gaillard, Tefft Johnson, Ralph Ince and Wallace Reid in The Seventh Son (1912), directed by Hal Reid; and along Evelyn Nesbitt, Russell Thaw, Henry Clive, Alphonse Ethier and Jane Jennings in I Want to Forget (1918), directed by James Kirkwood.

Dunn was married to Sabel Johnson, who performed in, and wrote for, vaudeville sketches. They had a son, William Welcome Dunn.

== Filmography ==
- Sundown (1941) as Kipsang's Victim
- Stanley and Livingstone (1939) as Chuma
- Too Hot to Handle (1938) as Native Chief
- White Hunter (1936) as Minor Role
- Roberta (1935) as Wabash Indianian
- Black Moon (1934) as Langa
- King of the Jungle (1933)
- Nagana (1933) as Mukovo
- Painted Ponies (1927) as Pinto Pete
- Devil's Island (1926) as Guillet
- Vanishing Hoofs (1926) as Jack Slade
- The Redeeming Sin (1925) as Gaston
- The Forbidden Valley (1920) as Dave
- The House of the Tolling Bell (1920) as Jules La Rocque
- The Blood Barrier (1920) as Eugene Solari
- Respectable by Proxy (1920) as Clinton Hale
- The Undercurrent (1919) as Ivan
- Woman, Woman! (1919) as Bud Hickson
- I Want to Forget (1918) as Helgar
- The Buyer from Cactus City (1918)
- Social Quicksands (1918) as Jim
- The Little Runaway (1918) as Peter Dowd
- Nemesis and the Candy Man (1918)
- Beyond the Law (1918) as Grat Dalton
- The Wooing of Princess Pat (1918) as Count Ladislaus
- His Own People (1917) as Percival Cheltenham
- I Will Repay (1917) as Steve
- The Princess of Park Row (1917) as Kronski
- Mary Jane's Pa (1917) as Barrett Sheridan
- Clover's Rebellion (1917) as Bucky Raine
- The Gift of the Magi (1917)
- Babette (1917) as Guinard
- The Secret Kingdom (1917) as Juan
- The Scarlet Runner (1916) as Fitzgerald
- The Man Behind the Curtain (1916) as Mr. Gardner
- Artie, the Millionaire Kid (1916) as The detective
- Beaned by a Beanshooter (1916) as The Villainous Count
- Mrs. Dane's Danger (1916) as Jasper Dicey
- The Human Cauldron (1916) as Jack
- For a Woman's Fair Name (1916) as Bolles
- The Man He Used to Be (1916) as Robert Landy
- In Arcadia (1916) as The Clerk
- The Surprises of an Empty Hotel (1916) as Alfred the Count
- On Her Wedding Night (1915) as Carlo
- The Kidnapped Stockbroker (1915) as Alan Oldham – MacLaren's Partner
- My Lost One (1915) as Henri Durcharme – the Orchestra Conductor
- The Return of Maurice Donnelly (1915) as Gang Member
- The Juggernaut (1915) as Phillip Hardin
- For Another's Crime (1915) as Steve Harney – Deputy Sheriff
- The Right Girl? (1915) as Mr. Newlywed
- In the Latin Quarter (1915)
- Love and Law (1915)
- Love Will Out (1914)
- Out of the Past (1914) as Cyril Benton
- COD (1914) as Wallie Walton
- The Spirit of the Poppy (1914) as Jack Murray
- The Locked Door (1914) as Harold Forsythe, Arnold's Son
- The Heart of Sonny Jim (1914)
- The Spitfire (1914) as Beasley
- The Bar Cross Liar (1914) as The Bar Cross Liar
- The Caballero's Way (1914) as The Cisco Kid
- A Modern Jekyll and Hyde (1913) as Bill Hykes – Jethro's Henchman
- The Wreck (1913) as John Squires – the Secretary's Son
- The Whimsical Threads of Destiny (1913) as Pietro, Circus Director
- Why I Am Here (1913)
- When Glasses Are Not Glasses (1913)
- The Line-Up (1913) as Harvey Livingston, Edith's Brother
- An Imp Romance (1913) as 2nd Rival Sculptor
- Gold Is Not All (1913) as Mr. Rich
- The New Magdalen (1912) as Horace Holmcroft – a War Correspondent
- The Old Folks' Christmas (1912) as Frank Dobson
- The Long Strike (1912) as Richard Readley
- Lass o' the Light (1912) as The Assistant Lighthouse Keeper
- No Greater Love (1912) as Paul's Brother
- Vengeance (1912) as James Ridley
- Human Hearts (1912)
- Making Good (1912) as Bert Austin – Billy's Rival
- The Widow's Claim (1912) as Jack – the Gambler
- The High Cost of Living (1912) as Mr. Mailman
- Chamber of Forgetfulness (1912) as The Young Man from the West
- Saved from the Titanic (1912) as Jack's pal
- Her Week of Anguish (1912) as The Husband
- The Red Ink Tragedy (1912) as An Innocent Suspect
- A Son's Ingratitude (1912) as Robert Gray – the Son
- The Seventh Son (1912) as One of the Beecham Brothers
- The Black Wall (1912)
- A Cure for Pokeritis (1912)
- The Hobo's Redemption (1912) as Jim Donovan – Manager of the Mine
- For the Honor of the Family (1912) as Maj. Jarvis
- Love Finds the Way (1912) as Wallace Hardy – Jack's Rival
- Love Will Find a Way (1912) as The Rival
- Alma's Champion (1912) as Stephen Bradish
- Vanity Fair (1911)
- The Sick Man from the East (1911) as 1st Thief
- His Wife's Secret (1911) as Jackson
- Saving the Special (1911) as Pete Black – the False Friend
- His Last Cent (1911)
- The Voiceless Message (1911) as The Burglar
- Her Cowboy Lover (1911) as Harry Brady
- The Gossip (1911)
- The Foolishness of Jealousy (1911) as Lou Carson
- The Mate of the 'John M' (1911) as Jim – the Mate of the John M
- The Wager (1911) as Masters
- In the Philippines; or, By the Campfire's Flicker (1911)
- How Millie Became an Actress (1911) as Dick Graham – Millie's Sweetheart
- The Thumb Print (1911) as Martini – Case's Partner
- The Second Honeymoon (1911) as Sadie's Sweetheart
- Birds of a Feather (1911) as Dick – Agnes's Sweetheart
- Billy the Kid (1911)
- The Long Skirt (1911)
