= Jim, the Conqueror =

1926 film

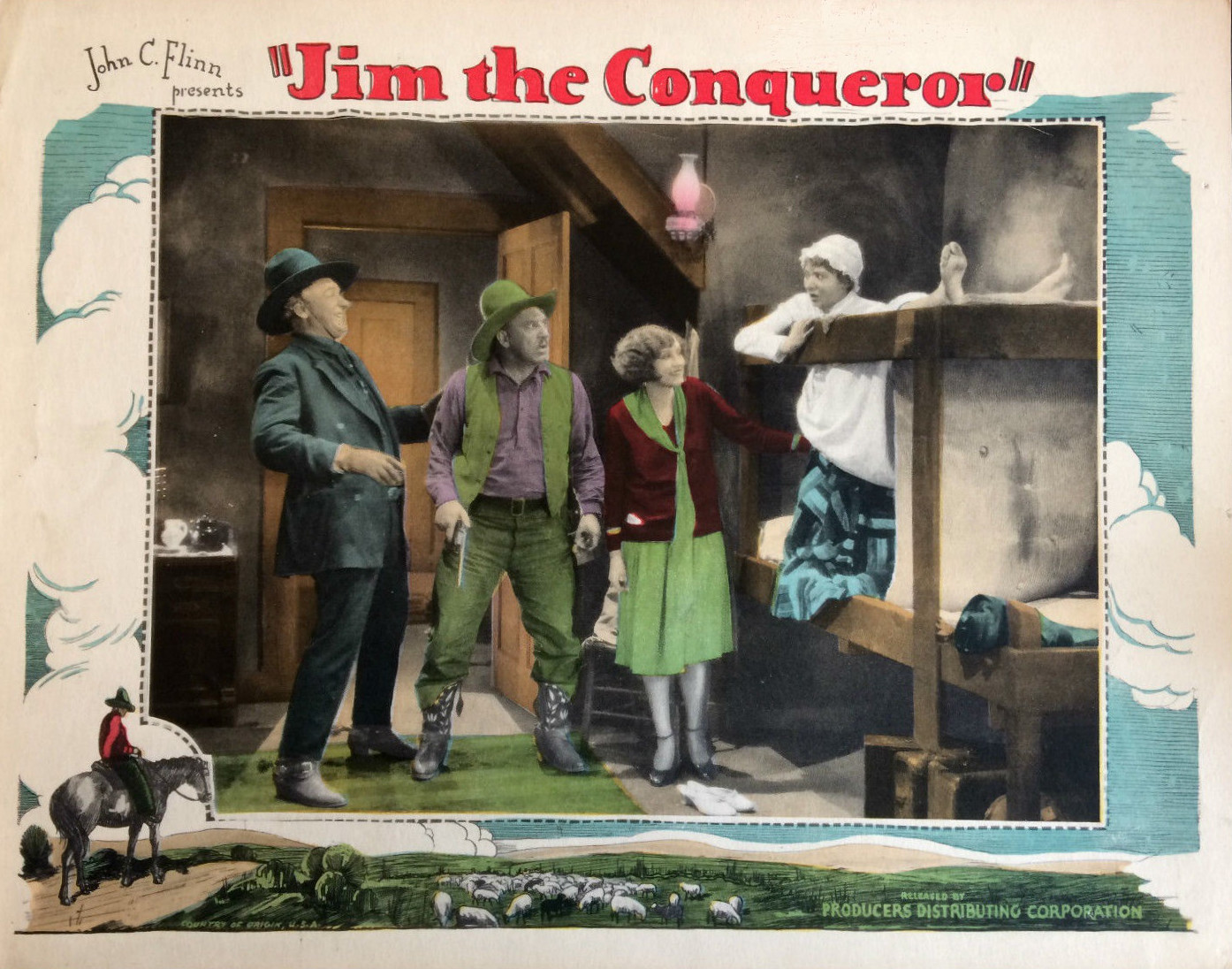
- Lobby card
- Directed by: George B. Seitz
- Written by: Will M. Ritchey
- Starring: William Boyd
- Cinematography: Harold Rosson
- Production company: Metropolitan Pictures Corporation of California
- Distributed by: Producers Distributing Corporation (PDC)
- Release date: December 27, 1926
- Running time: 60 minutes
- Country: United States
- Languages: Silent; English intertitles

Jim, the Conqueror is a 1926 American silent Western film directed by George B. Seitz and starring William Boyd and Elinor Fair.

== Cast ==
- William Boyd as Jim Burgess
- Elinor Fair as Polly Graydon
- Walter Long as Hank Milford
- Tully Marshall as Dave Mahler
- Tom Santschi as Sam Black
- Marcelle Corday as Judy

== Preservation ==
A print of Jim, the Conqueror survives in the French archive Centre national du cinéma et de l'image animée in Fort de Bois-d'Arcy, and a negative may be in the Library of Congress.
