= Robert Gordon (actor, born 1895) =

American actor

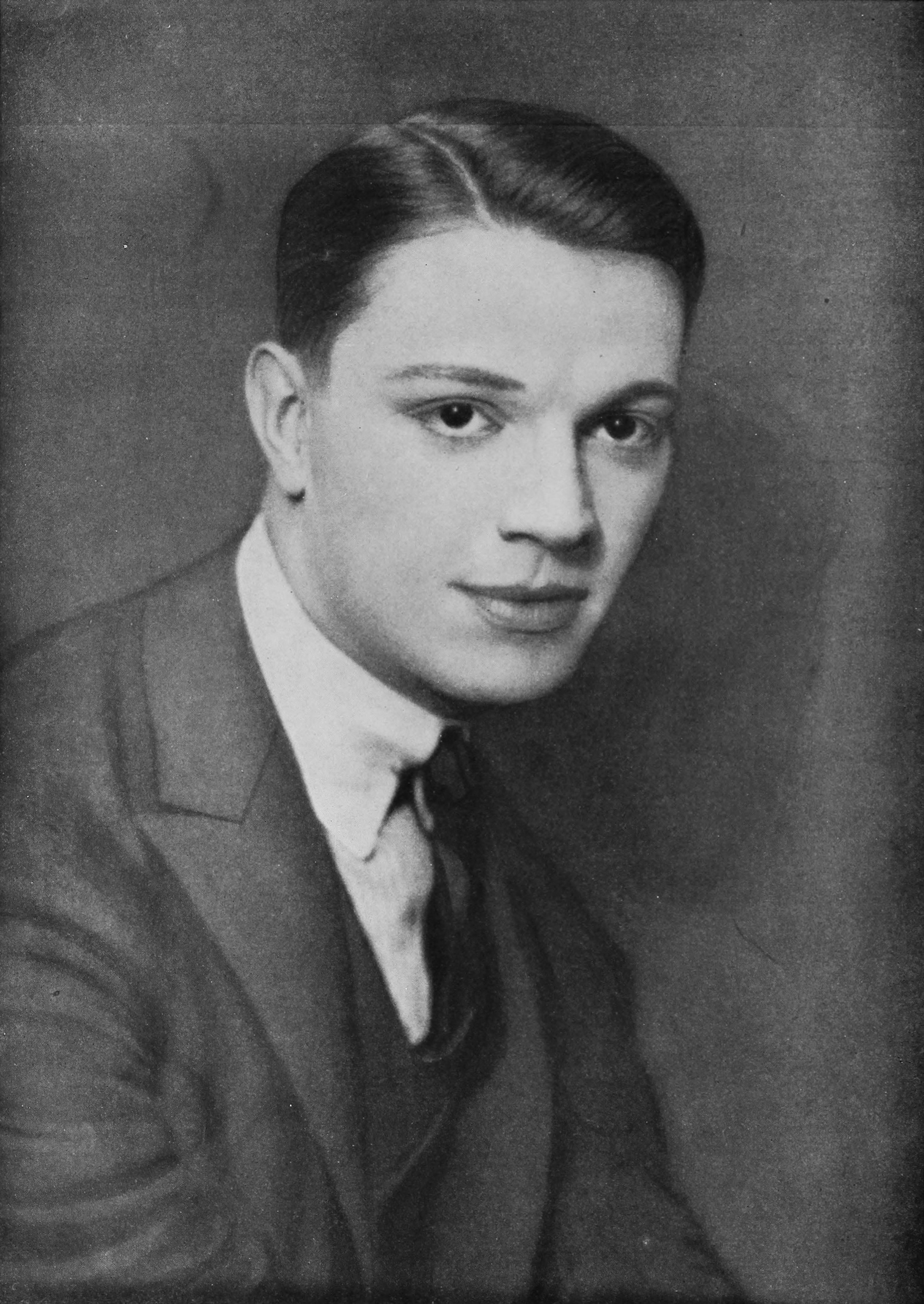
- Photoplay, 1920
- Born: Robert Gordon Duncan; March 3, 1895; Belleville, Kansas, U.S.
- Died: October 26, 1971 (aged 76); Victorville, California, U.S.
- Occupation: Actor
- Spouse: Alma Francis (m. 1919, divorced)

Robert Gordon (March 3, 1895 – October 26, 1971), born Robert Gordon Duncan, was an American silent film actor. He was born in Belleville, Kansas and died at the age of 76 in Victorville, California. He is credited with appearances in 35 films from 1917 to 1949.

== Partial filmography ==
- The Varmint (1917)
- Tom Sawyer (1917)
- The Hired Man (1918)
- 'Blue Blazes' Rawden (1918)
- Huck and Tom (1918)
- The Kaiser, the Beast of Berlin (1918)
- Missing (1918)
- A Pair of Silk Stockings (1918)
- Captain Kidd, Jr. (1919)
- A Yankee Princess (1919)
- The Blood Barrier (1920)
- The Vice of Fools (1920)
- Respectable by Proxy (1920)
- My Husband's Other Wife (1920)
- If Women Only Knew (1921)
- The Rosary (1922)
- The Super-Sex (1922)
- The Mysterious Witness (1923)
- The Greatest Menace (1923)
- Main Street (1923)
- Borrowed Husbands (1924)
- The Measure of a Man (1924)
- The Danger Signal (1925)
- His People (1925)
- Shattered Lives (1925)
- The Night Ship (1925)
- My Husband's Other Wife (1926)
- King of the Pack (1926)
- Hearts and Spangles (1926)
- Sinews of Steel (1927)
- Mountains of Manhattan (1927)
