= My Friend from India =

1927 film by E. Mason Hopper

- Directed by: E. Mason Hopper
- Written by: Rex Taylor
- Based on: play My Friend from India by Henry A. Du Souchet
- Produced by: DeMille Pictures
- Starring: Franklin Pangborn; Elinor Fair
- Cinematography: Dewey Wrigley
- Edited by: James Morley
- Distributed by: Pathé Exchange
- Release date: December 19, 1927
- Running time: 6 reels
- Country: United States
- Language: Silent..English titles

My Friend from India is a 1927 American silent comedy film directed by E. Mason Hopper and starring Franklin Pangborn and Elinor Fair. It was produced by DeMille Pictures and distributed by Pathé Exchange.

A previous film of this story was made in 1914 by the Edison Company.

Prints survive at the Library of Congress and UCLA Film & Television Archive.

== Cast ==
- Franklin Pangborn - William/Tommy Valentine
- Elinor Fair - Bernice/Barbara
- Ben Hendricks Jr. - Charles/Charlie
- Ethel Wales - Arabella Mott/Bedelia Smith
- Jeanette Loff - Marion/Ruth Brooks
- Tom Ricketts - Judge Elmer Elderberry Egbert Belmore
- Louis Natheaux - T. Austin Webb
- Tom Dugan - Kasha Murti/Swami/Bogus Hindu Prince
- George Ovey - Valet to Hindu Prince
- Edgar Norton - Jennings, a Butler
