= The Blood Barrier =

1920 film directed by J. Stuart Blackton

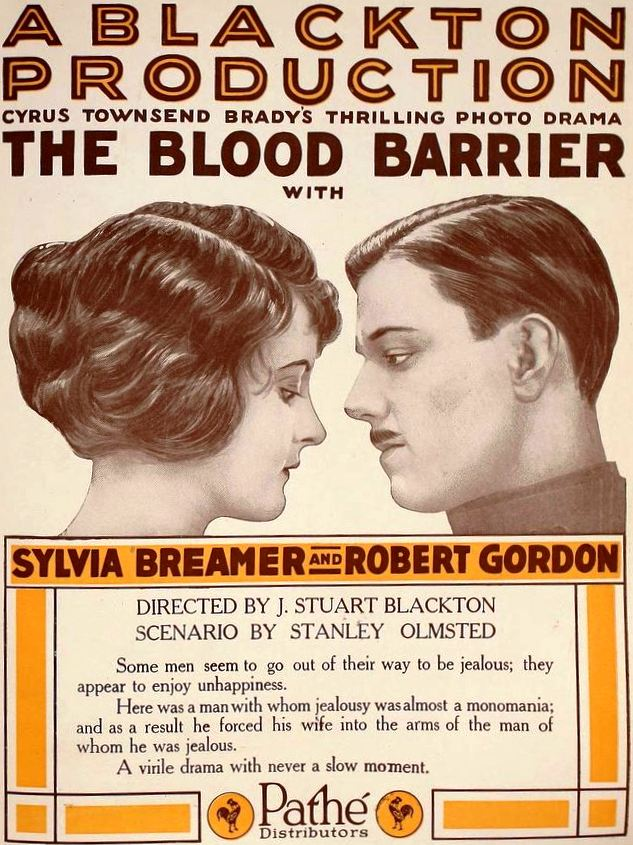
- Advertisement
- Directed by: J. Stuart Blackton
- Written by: Cyrus Townsend Brady; Stanley Olmstead
- Produced by: J. Stuart Blackton
- Starring: Sylvia Breamer; Robert Gordon; William R. Dunn
- Cinematography: William S. Adams
- Production company: J. Stuart Blackton Feature Pictures
- Distributed by: Pathé Exchange
- Release date: April 11, 1920
- Running time: 6 reels
- Country: United States
- Language: Silent (English intertitles)

The Blood Barrier is a 1920 American silent drama film directed by J. Stuart Blackton and starring Sylvia Breamer, Robert Gordon, and William R. Dunn.

== Plot ==
Eugene Solari harbors an obsessive jealousy towards his stunning wife, Enid. During one of her visits to Major Trevor on behalf of her father, Eugene discovers the rendezvous and, consumed by fury, rushes to Trevor's residence. Despite Enid's efforts to warn Trevor, she arrives too late; Eugene fatally shoots her and then takes his own life. However, before his demise, Eugene falsely accuses Trevor of the crime. Subsequently, Trevor is apprehended under suspicion of murder.

In a twist of events, a foreign operative, seeking a confidential formula possessed by Trevor, abducts Enid. The operative communicates with Trevor, offering to exonerate him and return Enid safely in exchange for the formula.

== Cast ==
- Sylvia Breamer as Enid Solari
- Robert Gordon as Major Robert Trevor
- William R. Dunn as Eugene Solari
- Eddie Dunn as Eddie Brown
- Louis Dean as Zu Paven
- Margaret Barry as Madame Marechek
- Gus Alexander as 'Left'

== Bibliography ==
- Wesley Alan Britton. Onscreen and Undercover: The Ultimate Book of Movie Espionage. Greenwood, 2006. ISBN 978-0-275-99281-1.
