= Lady Windermere's Fan (1925 film) =

1925 film by Ernst Lubitsch

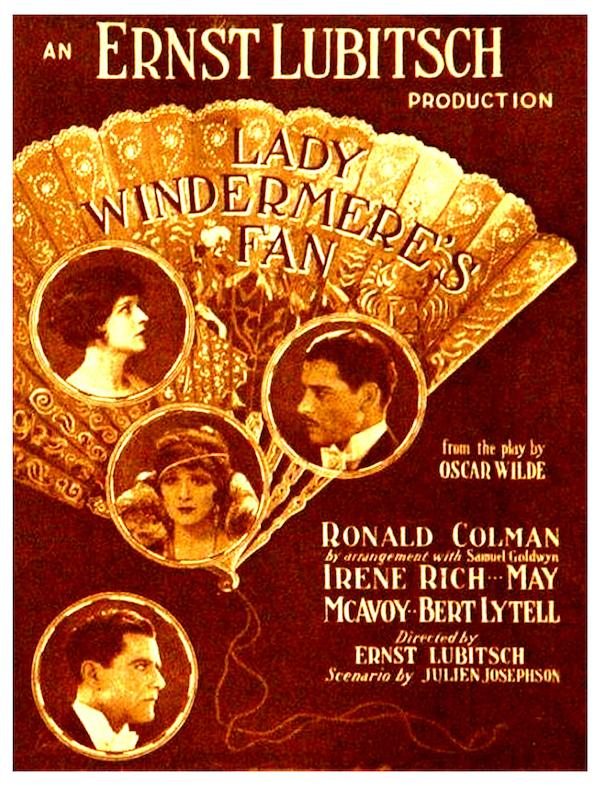
- Theatrical release poster
- Directed by: Ernst Lubitsch
- Written by: Julien Josephson (adaptation); Maude Fulton and Eric Locke (titles)
- Based on: Lady Windermere's Fan by Oscar Wilde
- Produced by: Ernst Lubitsch; Darryl F. Zanuck (uncredited)
- Starring: Ronald Colman; May McAvoy; Bert Lytell; Irene Rich
- Cinematography: Charles Van Enger
- Edited by: Ernst Lubitsch
- Distributed by: Warner Bros.
- Release date: December 26, 1925
- Running time: 120 minutes (Denmark); 89 minutes (2004 National Film Preservation Foundation print)
- Country: United States
- Language: Silent (English intertitles)
- Budget: $320,000
- Box office: $398,000

Lady Windermere's Fan

Lady Windermere's Fan is a 1925 American silent drama film directed by Ernst Lubitsch. It is based on Oscar Wilde's 1892 play Lady Windermere's Fan, which was first played in America by Julia Arthur as Lady Windermere and Maurice Barrymore as Lord Darlington. The film is preserved in multiple archives. It was transferred to 16mm film by Associated Artists Productions in the 1950s for television. In 2002, it was selected for preservation in the United States National Film Registry by the Library of Congress as "culturally, historically, or aesthetically significant."

== Plot ==
In London, Lady Margaret Windermere fends off Lord Darlington's flirtations while her husband receives a letter from Mrs. Erlynne, a notorious woman who claims to be Lady Windermere's mother. Believing her mother is dead, Lady Windermere reveres her memory. To prevent her from learning the truth, Lord Windermere gives Mrs. Erlynne £1500 in exchange for her silence.

Mrs. Erlynne reenters society and draws attention, especially from Lord Augustus Lorton. Suspicious of her husband's behavior, Lady Windermere finds the cheque and confronts him. He admits helping Mrs. Erlynne and reveals she will attend their ball. Lady Windermere is outraged.

Lord Windermere later rescinds the invitation, but Mrs. Erlynne arrives anyway. She gains entry through Lorton and is introduced at the ball. Lady Windermere, unaware of her efforts, flees to Lord Darlington's house, leaving a note for her husband.

Mrs. Erlynne follows, finds the note, and persuades Lady Windermere to return home. When the men arrive, Mrs. Erlynne claims the fan Lady Windermere left behind is hers. Scandal is avoided.

The next morning, Mrs. Erlynne returns the fan, asks Lady Windermere to remain silent, and declines Lorton's proposal. He follows her as she leaves for France.

== Cast ==
May McAvoy and Bert Lytell

- Ronald Colman as Lord Darlington
- May McAvoy as Lady Windermere
- Bert Lytell as Lord Windermere
- Irene Rich as Mrs. Erlynne
- Edward Martindel as Lord Augustus Lorton
- Carrie Daumery as the Duchess of Berwick
- Billie Bennett as Lady Plymdale (uncredited)
- Michael Dark as party guest (uncredited)
- Helen Dunbar as Mrs. Cowper-Cowper (uncredited)
- Frank Finch Smiles as waiter with party guest list (uncredited)
- Larry Steers as party guest (uncredited)
- Ellinor Vanderveer as party guest (uncredited)
- Percy Williams as waiter at the party (uncredited)

== Box office ==
According to Warner Bros. records, the film earned $324,000 domestically and $74,000 abroad.

== Home media ==
The film is available on DVD in the More Treasures from American Film Archives collection.

== Preservation and screenings ==
Lady Windermere's Fan was screened at the George Eastman House's Dryden Theater in 2025, with live piano accompaniment by Dr. Philip Carli. The 35 mm print was cited as "Restored by The Museum of Modern Art, with the financial support of Matthew and Natalie Bernstein."
