= The Timber Wolf =

1925 film

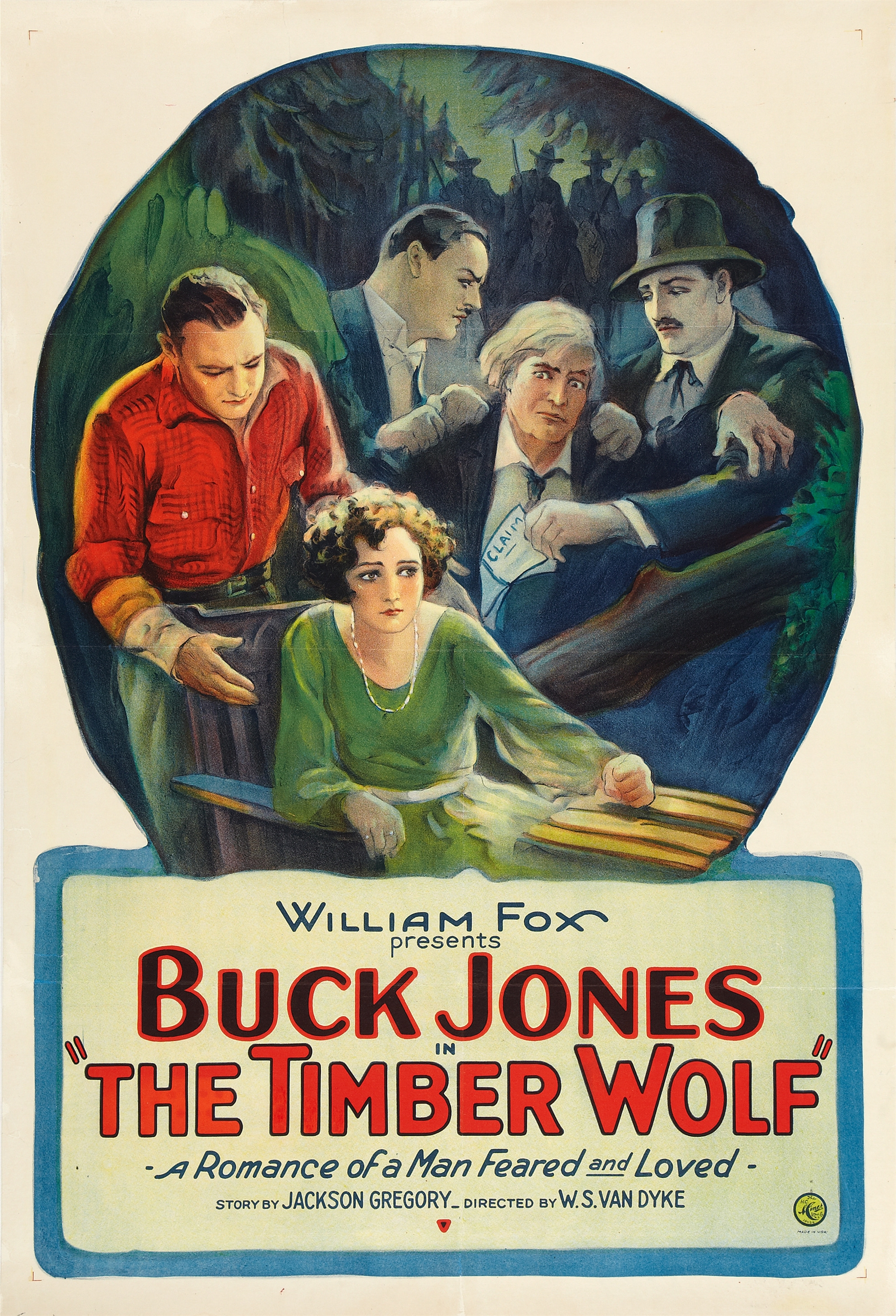
- Theatrical release poster
- Directed by: W.S. Van Dyke
- Written by: John Stone
- Story by: Jackson Gregory
- Produced by: William Fox
- Starring: Buck Jones; Elinor Fair; Dave Winter
- Cinematography: Allen M. Davey
- Production company: Fox Film
- Distributed by: Fox Film
- Release date: September 20, 1925
- Running time: 50 minutes
- Country: United States
- Languages: Silent; English intertitles

The Timber Wolf is a lost 1925 American silent Western film directed by W. S. Van Dyke and starring Buck Jones, Elinor Fair, and Dave Winter.

== Cast ==
- Buck Jones as Bruce Standing
- Elinor Fair as Renee Brooks
- Dave Winter as Babe Deveril
- Sam Allen as Joe Terry
- Will Walling as Sheriff
- Jack Craig as The Boy
- Bobbie Mack as Billy Winch

== Preservation ==
With no holdings located in archives, The Timber Wolf is considered a lost film.

== Bibliography ==
- Munden, Kenneth White. The American Film Institute Catalog of Motion Pictures Produced in the United States, Part 1. University of California Press, 1997.
