= Married in Haste =

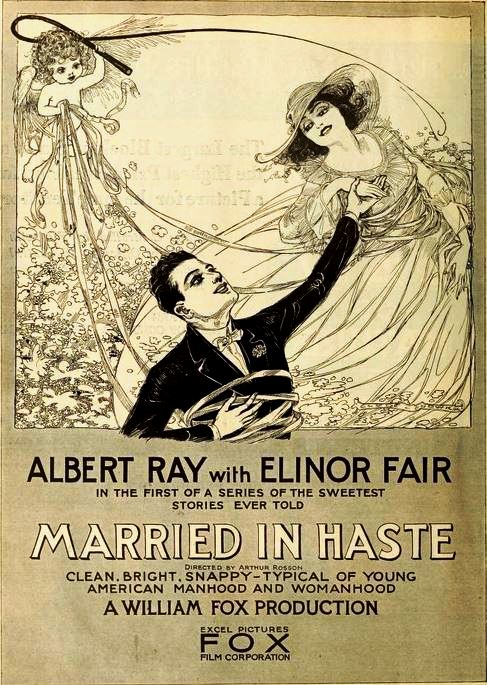
- Film poster
- Directed by: Arthur Rosson
- Written by: E. Lloyd Sheldon; J. Searle Dawley; Charles Kenyon
- Produced by: William Fox
- Starring: Albert Ray; Elinor Fair; Robert Klein
- Cinematography: Roy H. Klaffki
- Production company: Fox Film
- Distributed by: Fox Film
- Release date: April 6, 1919
- Running time: 50 minutes
- Country: United States
- Languages: Silent; English intertitles

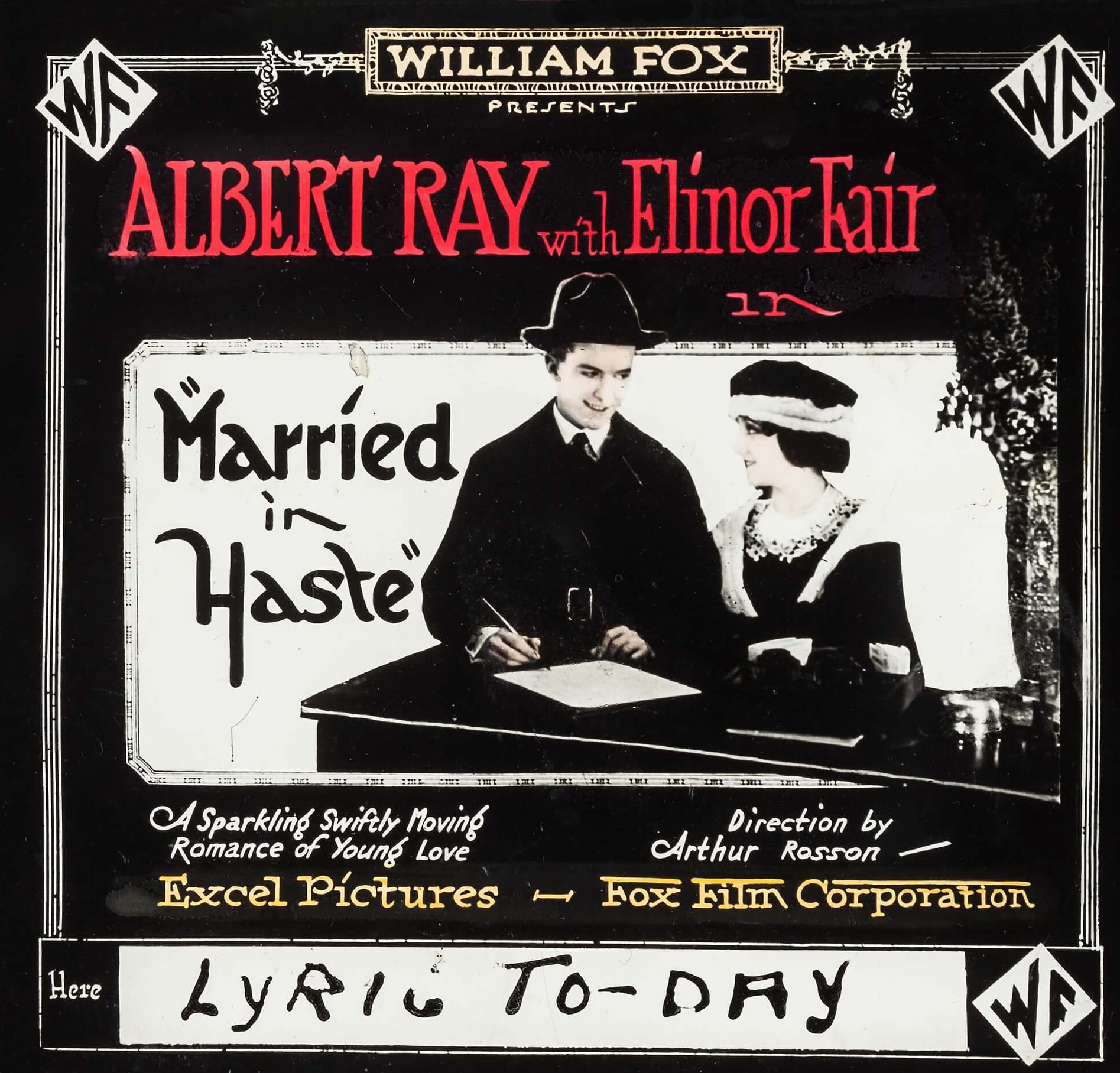
Married in Haste (1919) lantern slide

Married in Haste is a 1919 American silent comedy film directed by Arthur Rosson and starring Albert Ray, Elinor Fair and Robert Klein.

== Cast ==
- Albert Ray as Sam Morgan
- Elinor Fair as Constance Winwood
- Robert Klein as Agramonte
- Don Bailey as Brown
- Bowditch M. Turner as Hernandez
- Thomas Jefferson as Downer
- William A. Carroll as The Valet
- William Elmer as Chauffeur

== Preservation ==
With no holdings located in archives, Married in Haste is considered a lost film.
