= The Lion and the Mouse (1928 film) =

1928 film

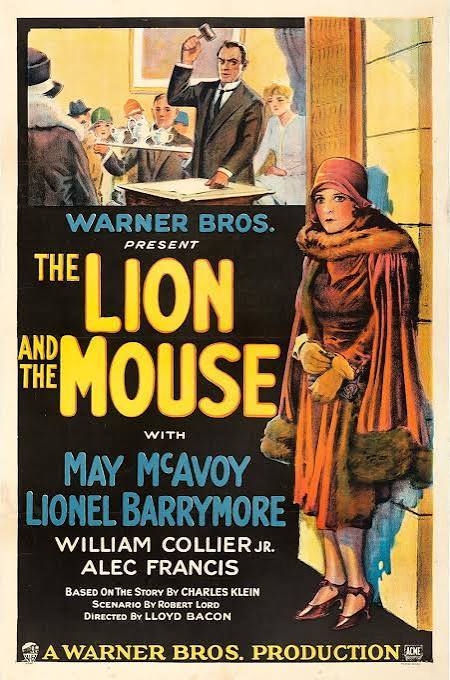
- Theatrical release poster
- Directed by: Lloyd Bacon
- Written by: Charles Klein (play); Robert Lord (screenplay); James A. Starr (intertitles)
- Starring: May McAvoy; Lionel Barrymore
- Cinematography: Norbert Brodine
- Edited by: Harold McCord
- Production company: Warner Bros.
- Distributed by: Warner Bros.
- Release date: May 21, 1928
- Running time: 7 reels (sound version); 8 reels (silent version)
- Country: United States
- Languages: Sound (Part-Talkie); English intertitles
- Budget: $113,000
- Box office: $969,000

The Lion and the Mouse is a 1928 American sound part-talkie drama film produced by Warner Bros., directed by Lloyd Bacon, and based on the 1905 play by Charles Klein. In addition to sequences with audible dialogue or talking sequences, the film features a synchronized musical score and sound effects along with English intertitles. According to the film review in Variety, 28 minutes of the total running time featured dialogue. The first talking sequence lasted for eight minutes at the start of the film and the second talking sequence occurred in the final twenty minutes of the film. The soundtrack was recorded using the Vitaphone sound-on-disc system. The film marks the first time Lionel Barrymore, who was on loan for the film from MGM, spoke from the screen.

== Plot ==
"Ready Money" Ryder, a powerful financial magnate, advises Judge Ross to purchase Pacific Oil stock. When Ross follows this advice, it is later publicized that he accepted the stock as a bribe. A letter in Ryder's possession would prove the judge's innocence by showing the purchase was legitimate, but Ryder, angered by a past court decision against him, withholds the letter to ruin Ross's reputation.

While abroad, Ross's daughter Shirley, a talented sculptor, meets Ryder's son, Jefferson. They return to the United States on the same ocean liner, and their budding friendship quickly deepens into love.

Upon returning home, Shirley learns of her father's disgrace and determines to retrieve the letter from Ryder's home. She gains access by accepting a commission to sculpt Ryder's bust and asks Jeff not to reveal her true identity. Jeff, unaware of her motives but eager to help her, appeals to his father to clear Judge Ross's name, hinting at his desire to marry Ross's daughter. Ryder, enraged, refuses.

Shirley steals the crucial letter from Ryder's desk. When its disappearance is discovered, Ryder accuses Jeff, but Shirley confesses, revealing her true identity and admitting to taking the letter. Ryder then proposes a deal: he will exonerate Judge Ross if Shirley agrees to give up Jeff.

Shirley complies, and Ross is cleared of all accusations. When Jeff, unaware of the agreement, pleads with Shirley to marry him, she coldly rejects him, claiming she used him only to help her father.

Ryder, moved by Shirley's sacrifice and loyalty, regrets his scheming. He tells Jeff the truth about Shirley's devotion, and the two rush to the Ross home. There, Judge Ross gives his blessing to the young couple.

== Cast ==
- May McAvoy as Shirley Ross
- Lionel Barrymore as John Ryder
- Alec B. Francis as Judge Ross
- William Collier Jr. as Jefferson Ryder
- Emmett Corrigan as Dr. Hays
- Jack Ackroyd as Smith, Jeff's valet

Cast notes

- Barrymore and McAvoy had last costarred in 1920 in The Devil's Garden.

== Box Office ==
According to Warner Bros records the film earned $869,000 domestically and $100,000 foreign.

== Preservation ==
The movie survives in 35 mm at the Library of Congress and 16 mm at the University of Wisconsin–Madison. The soundtrack on Vitaphone discs partially survives in the UCLA Film and Television Archive.

== See also ==
- Lionel Barrymore filmography
- List of early sound feature films (1926–1929)
