= Elinor Fair =

American actress

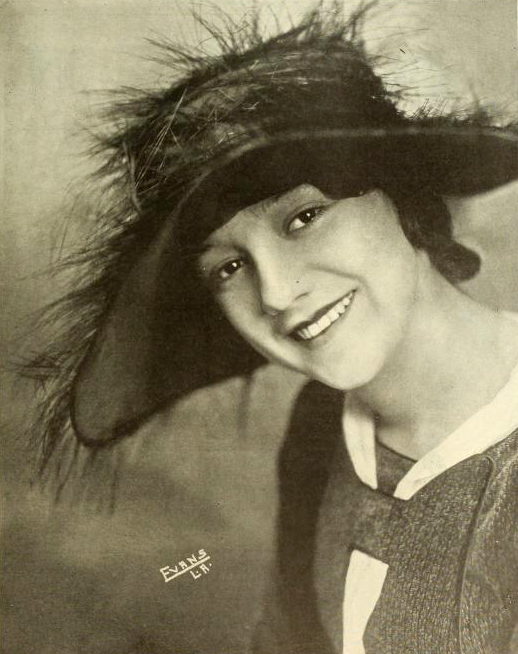
- Fair in 1919
- Born: Elinor Virginia Crowe; December 21, 1903; Richmond, Virginia, U.S
- Died: April 26, 1957 (aged 53); Seattle, Washington, U.S.
- Other name: Lenore Fair
- Occupation: Actress
- Years active: 1916–1934
- Spouses: William Boyd (m. 1926; div. 1929) Thomas Daniels (m. 1934; div. 1935) Jack White (m. 1941; div. 1944) ? Martin (m. 1945)

Elinor Virginia Martin (née Crowe; December 21, 1903 – April 26, 1957), known professionally as Elinor Fair, was an American motion picture actress.

== Early years ==
Elinor Virginia Crowe was born on December 21, 1903, in Richmond, Virginia, to Harry Joseph Crowe, a salesman, and Helen Snowden Jones. Her older brother Donald died in 1904 just four months short of his third birthday. During her childhood her family relocated multiple times. Fair attended high school in Greenwich, Connecticut, and developed an interest in interpretive dance.

== Career ==
When Fair was elected a WAMPAS Baby Star in 1924, she had already been in films for a number of years, and in vaudeville before that. She did some of her best work under contract to Cecil B. DeMille, appearing in such productions as Yankee Clipper and Let 'er go Gallagher. She also played in a handful of talkies, (often reduced to minor roles) before disappearing from the big screen in 1934.

== Personal life ==
On January 13, 1926, Fair eloped and married actor William Boyd In Santa Ana, and they remained married until 1929. Boyd's proposal was unique—while filming a scene for the DeMille film The Volga Boatman (1926), Boyd's character professes his love for Fair's character. However, what audiences were not aware of (due to The Volga Boatman being a silent film) was that Boyd was actually proposing for real, and that Fair accepted in character and in real life. They did not have any children together.

On December 27, 1932, Fair married aviator Thomas W. Daniels in Yuma, Arizona. He obtained an annulment on June 20, 1934, although she had already obtained a Mexican decree of divorce. They reconciled and remarried. They divorced, however, in 1935. She next married Jack White in 1941, but this marriage too ended in divorce in 1944.

== Death ==
On April 26, 1957, Fair died of acute alcoholism and cirrhosis in King County Hospital in Seattle, aged 53. Her body was cremated.

== Selected filmography ==
- The Fires of Conscience (1916) *lost film
- The Reckoning Day (1918)
- The Road Through the Dark (1918)
- The Turn of a Card (1918)
- The End of the Game (1919)
- Married in Haste (1919)
- The Miracle Man (1919) *lost film, only two fragments survive
- The Girl in Number 29 (1920) *lost film
- Broadway and Home (1920)
- Kismet (1920) *lost film, but the soundtrack survives
- Through the Back Door (1921)
- Cold Steel (1921)
- The Policeman and the Baby (1921) with Wallace Beery
- Big Stakes (1922)
- Dangerous Pastime (1922)
- Driven (1923) *lost film
- Has the World Gone Mad! (1923) *lost film
- The Eagle's Feather (1923)
- One Million in Jewels (1923)
- The Mysterious Witness (1923)
- The Law Forbids (1924)
- The Timber Wolf (1925)
- Gold and the Girl (1925)
- Bachelor Brides (1926)
- The Volga Boatman (1926)
- Jim, the Conqueror (1926)
- The Yankee Clipper (1927)
- My Friend from India (1927)
- Sin Town (1929)
- The Night Rider (1932)
- 45 Calibre Echo (1932)
