= My Husband's Other Wife =

1920 film by J. Stuart Blackton

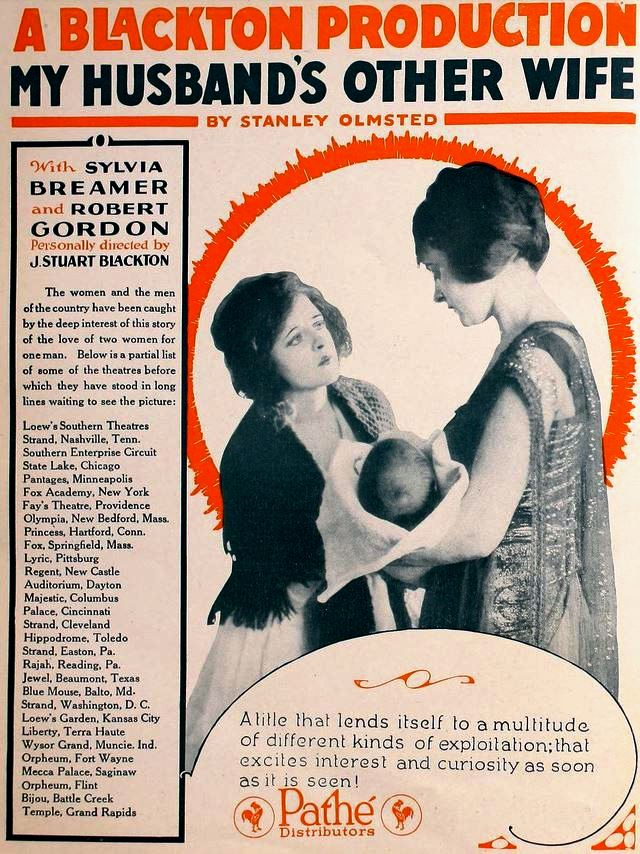
- Directed by: J. Stuart Blackton
- Written by: Stanley Olmstead
- Produced by: J. Stuart Blackton
- Starring: Sylvia Breamer; Robert Gordon; May McAvoy
- Cinematography: William S. Adams
- Production company: J. Stuart Blackton Feature Pictures
- Distributed by: Pathé Exchange
- Release date: January 4, 1920
- Country: United States
- Languages: Silent; English intertitles

My Husband's Other Wife is a 1920 American silent drama film directed by J. Stuart Blackton and starring Sylvia Breamer, Robert Gordon and May McAvoy. There are no known archival holdings of the film, so it is presumably a lost film.

== Plot ==
A woman who was a popular star in a theatre divorces her husband. After the divorce she decides she wants her husband back, even though he now has another wife.

== Cast ==
- Sylvia Breamer as Adelaide Hedlar
- Robert Gordon as Wilifred Dean
- Warren Chandler as Dr. Mark Ridgewell
- May McAvoy as Nettie Bryson
- Fanny Rice as Rita Rivulet

== Bibliography ==
- Slide, Anthony. The Big V: A History of the Vitagraph Company. Scarecrow Press, 1987. ISBN 978-0-8108-2030-2.
