= Nanine Wright =

American actress

- Born: June 3, 1876; Oregon, Ohio, U.S.
- Died: May 23, 1947 (aged 70); California, U.S.
- Occupation: Actress

Nanine Wright (June 3, 1876 – May 23, 1947) was an American silent film actress. She is known for her roles in Risky Business (1920) and the lost film serial Graft as Mrs. Larnigan.

== Filmography ==
- The Mysterious Witness (1923) as Mrs. John Brant
- Play Square (1921) as Johnny's Mother
- Risky Business (1920) as Grandma
- The Luck of Geraldine Laird (1920) as Mrs. Fitzpatrick
- Destiny (1919) as Mrs. Burton
- Whom the Gods Would Destroy (1919)
- Rosemary Climbs the Heights (1918) as Hilda Van Voort
- The Square Deal (1918) as Mary Gilson
- The Reed Case (1917) as Mrs. John Reed
- The Thief Maker (Short) (1917) as Mrs. Stoddard
- A Blissful Calamity (Short) (1917) as Westie's Mother
- The Circus of Life (1917) as Undetermined Role (uncredited)
- The Phantom's Secret (1917) as Mrs. Lavinia Marston
- The Girl in the Garret (Short) (1917) as Mrs. Dunning
- The Indian's Lament (Short) (1917) as Mrs. Conolly
- The War Waif (Short) (1917) as Grandmother
- The Bubble of Love (Short) (1917) as Mrs. Seton
- A Child of Mystery (1916) Mrs. Andrews
- Wanted: A Home (1916) as The Widow
- The Whirlpool of Destiny (1916) as Mother Giles
- As in a Dream (Short) (1916) as Mrs. Robbins
- Naked Hearts (1916) as Cecil's Mother (as Nannie Wright)
- The Beloved Liar (Short) (1916) as Mrs. Quinby
- The Flirt (Short) (1916) as Mrs. Madison (as Nannine Wright)
- Graft (A lost Serial of 15 episodes) (1915) as Mrs. Larnigan

Liquor and the Law
The Tenement House Evil
The Traction Grab
Grinding Life Down
America Saved from War
Old King Coal
The Insurance Swindlers
The Patent Medicine Danger

- The Shot (Short) (1915) as Mrs. Garrett
