= Risky Business (1920 film) =

1920 film by Rollin S. Sturgeon

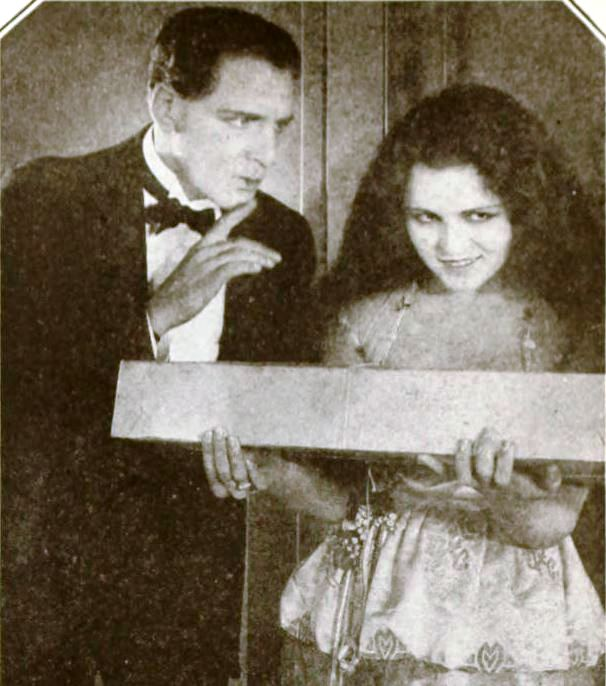
- Film still
- Directed by: Harry B. Harris; Rollin S. Sturgeon
- Written by: Douglas Doty; John Colton
- Based on: screen story by Douglas Doty and John Colton
- Produced by: Carl Laemmle
- Cinematography: Leighton Moore
- Distributed by: Universal Film Manufacturing Company
- Release date: December 1920
- Running time: 5 reels
- Country: United States
- Language: Silent (English intertitles)

Risky Business is a 1920 American silent drama film directed by Harry B. Harris and Rollin S. Sturgeon released by Universal. It stars Gladys Walton.

== Cast ==
- Gladys Walton as Phillipa
- Lillian Lawrence as Mrs. Fanshaw Renwick
- Maude Wayne as Errica
- Nanine Wright as Grandma
- Grant McKay as Roger
- Fred Malatesta as Ralli
- John Gough as Valet
- Louis Willoughby as Captain Chantry
- Fred Andrews as Dr. Houghton

== Preservation ==
With no prints of Risky Business located in any film archives, it is considered a lost film.
