= Fanny Rice =

American actress

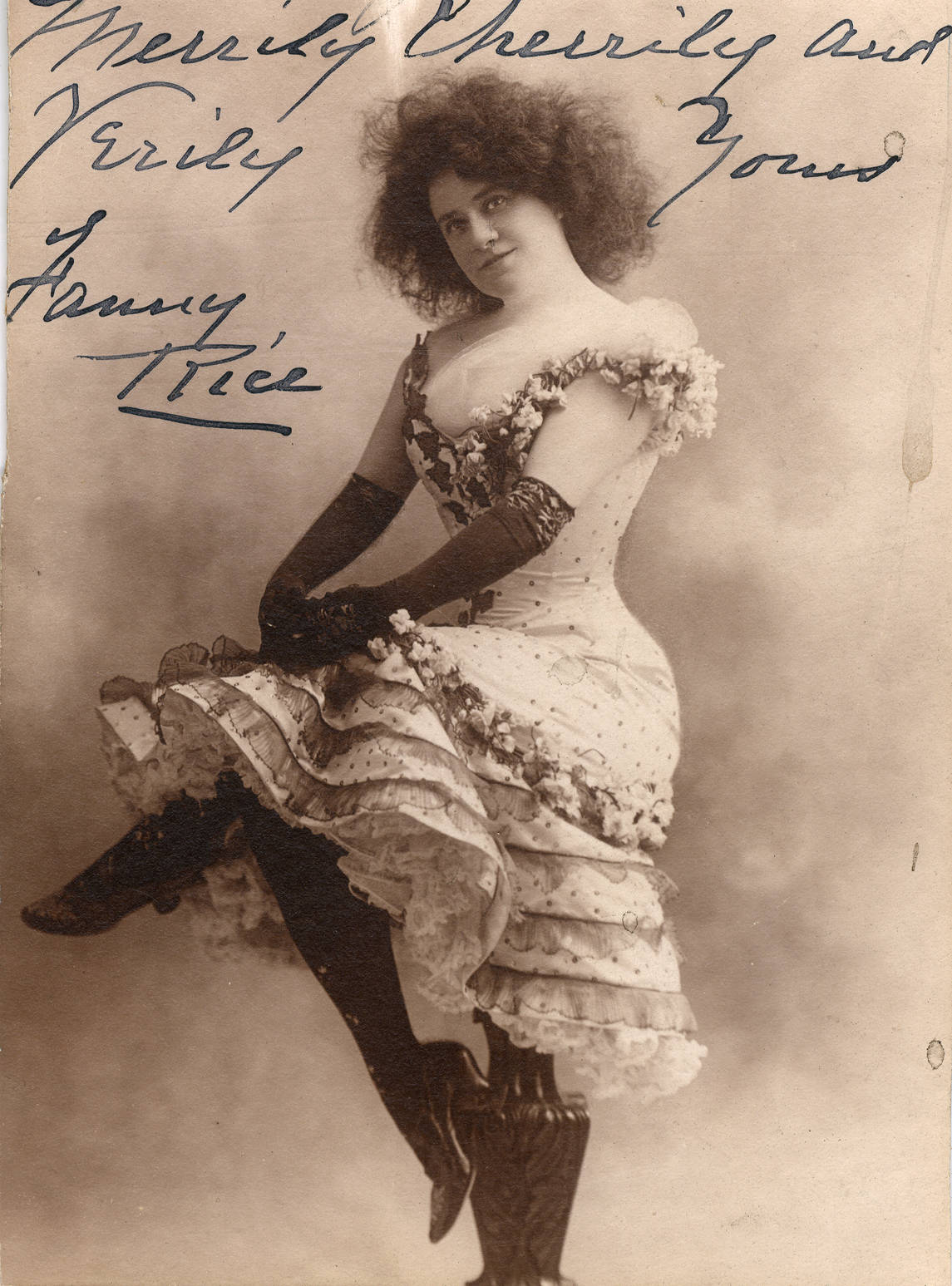
- Fanny Rice circa 1892
- Born: February 7, 1859; Lowell, Massachusetts, (Middlesex County) USA
- Died: July 10, 1936 (aged 77); Bronx, New York
- Other name: Fannie Rice
- Occupations: actress, singer
- Years active: 1880s-1920
- Spouses: Warren H. Purdy; G. W. Purdy

Fanny Rice (1859-1936), or Fannie Rice, was an American singer, comedienne and actress of stage and screen. She was born to Edward C. Rice and Ianthe Rice (nee Blanchard). She had two siblings an older brother Henry, who died as a child, and two older sisters Clara and Laura.

Beginning her career in the 1880s she appeared on stage with many stage luminaries of the day like Francis Wilson, Jefferson De Angelis, Joseph Jefferson and Mrs. John Drew all costarring in a popular revival of Sheridan's The Rivals.

Her tenure in films was brief making three silent films between 1919 and 1920.

She died in July 1936 and is interred under her married name of Purdy.

== Filmography ==
- The Moonshine Trail (1919)
- Dawn (1919)
- My Husband's Other Wife (1920)
