= Huck and Tom =

1918 film by William Desmond Taylor

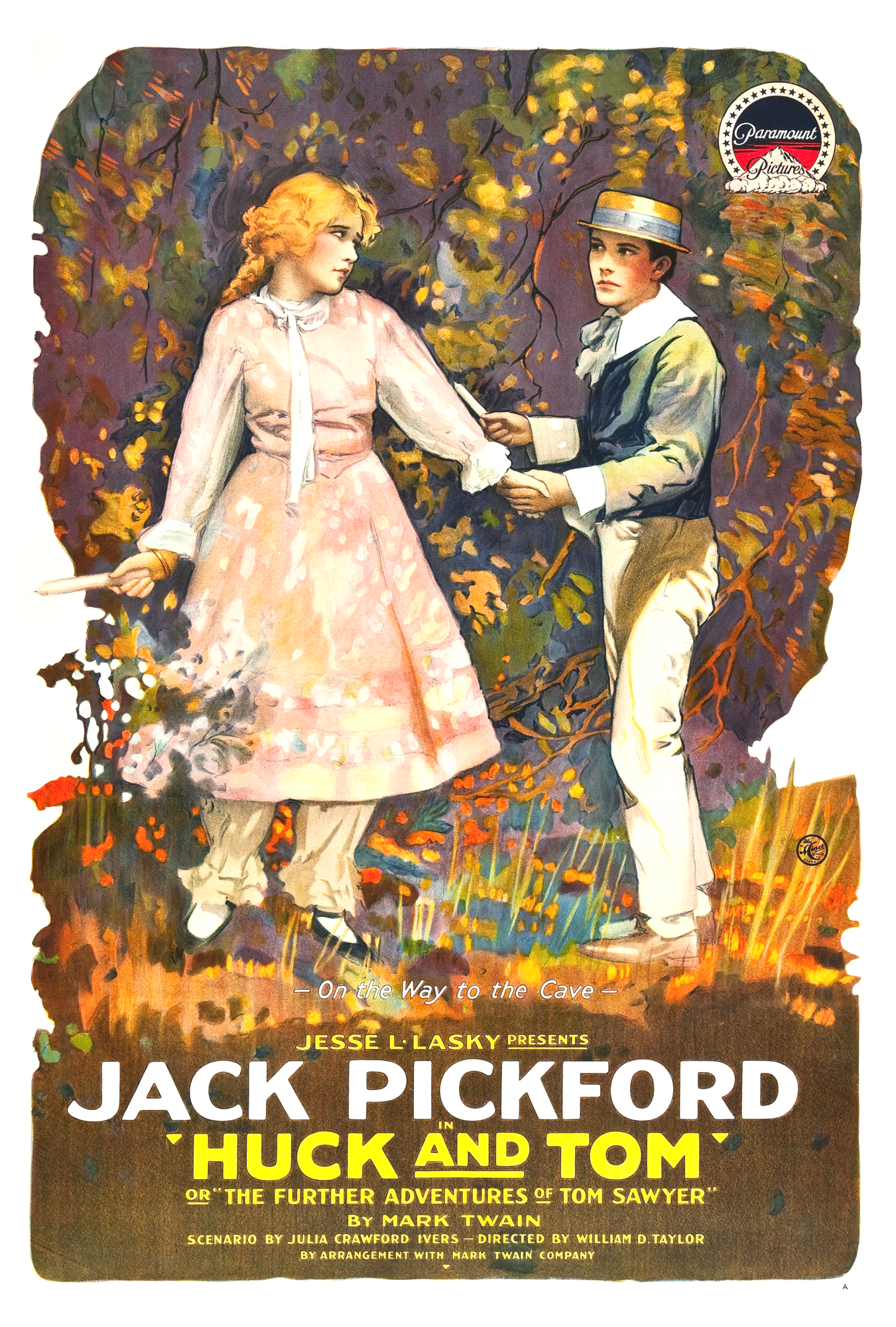
- Film poster
- Directed by: William Desmond Taylor
- Written by: Mark Twain (stories); Julia Crawford Ivers
- Produced by: Jesse L. Lasky
- Starring: Jack Pickford; Robert Gordon; George Hackathorne; Edythe Chapman; Frank Lanning; Clara Horton; Helen Gilmore; Antrim Short; Jane Keckley
- Cinematography: Homer Scott
- Distributed by: Famous Players–Lasky Co. Paramount Pictures
- Release date: May 13, 1918
- Running time: 5 reels
- Country: United States
- Language: Silent (English intertitles)

Huck and Tom is a surviving American comedy-drama film directed by William Desmond Taylor and released in 1918. The scenario by Julia Crawford Ivers is derived from Mark Twain's novel The Adventures of Tom Sawyer (1876). Robert Gordon and Jack Pickford reprise the title roles from the 1917 version of Tom Sawyer, a successful adaptation that was also directed by Taylor.

== Plot ==
As described in a film magazine, while in a graveyard trying an old remedy to get rid of their warts, Tom and Huck witness a murder. At the trial, their repetition of the story clears Muff Potter, an innocent suspect and victim of Injun Joe's plot. Injun Joe escapes to the Painted Cave, where the next day Tom and Becky become lost. After a four-day search, the missing ones come home and the entrance to the Painted Cave is sealed. Tom tells Judge Thatcher that Injun Joe is hiding there. The entrance to the cave is opened and the dead body of the murderer is brought out. Tom and Huck become the possessors of a treasure they found, and with this fortune they plan on becoming great and fierce robbers.

== Cast ==
- Jack Pickford as Tom Sawyer
- Robert Gordon as Huck Finn
- George Hackathorne as Sid Sawyer
- Alice Marvin as Mary Sawyer
- Edythe Chapman as Aunt Polly
- Frank Lanning as Injun Joe
- Clara Horton as Becky Thatcher
- Tom Bates as Muff Potter
- Helen Gilmore as Widow Douglas
- Antrim Short as Joe Harper
- Jane Keckley as Mrs. Thatcher
- John Burton as Judge Thatcher

== Reception ==
Upon its March 1918 release, Huck and Tom received indifferent reviews. Variety called it "acceptable" and Photoplay described it as "not so fascinating, being an unbelievable mixture of boyish fancy and Brady melodrama."

Like many American films of the time, Huck and Tom was subject to cuts by city and state film censorship boards. For example, the Chicago Board of Censors required cuts of, in Reel 1, the stabbing of a man in the back, robbing the dead man, in Reel 2, a vision of the stabbing of the man, and, in Reel 4, two scenes of Injun Joe prying open a window.

== Preservation status ==
This film is preserved at Archives du Film du CNC, Bois d'Arcy Archive.
