= The Mysterious Witness =

1923 film

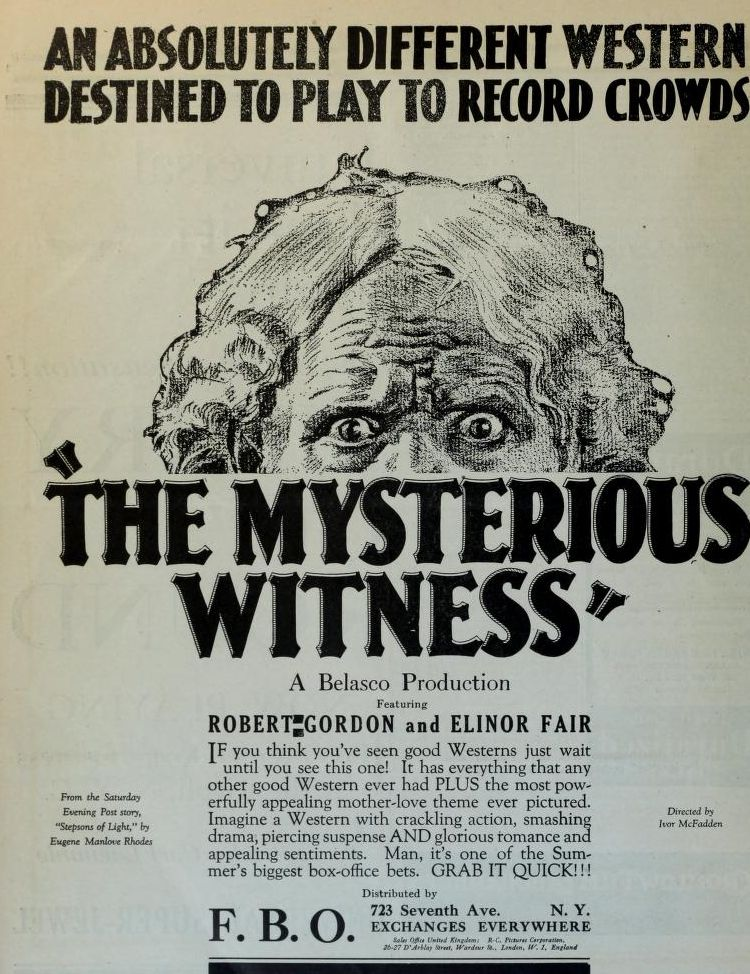
- Directed by: Seymour Zeliff
- Written by: Eugene Manlove Rhodes (novel)
- Produced by: Ivor McFadden
- Starring: Robert Gordon; Elinor Fair; Nanine Wright
- Production company: Robertson-Cole Pictures Corporation
- Distributed by: Film Booking Offices of America
- Release date: June 24, 1923
- Running time: 50 minutes
- Country: United States
- Languages: Silent; English intertitles

The Mysterious Witness is a 1923 American silent Western film directed by Seymour Zeliff and starring Robert Gordon, Elinor Fair and Nanine Wright.

== Cast ==
- Robert Gordon as Johnny Brant
- Elinor Fair as Ruth Garland
- Nanine Wright as Mrs. John Brant
- Jack Connolly as Ed Carney
- Wharton James as Jim Garland

== Bibliography ==
- Munden, Kenneth White. The American Film Institute Catalog of Motion Pictures Produced in the United States, Part 1. University of California Press, 1997.
