= Tom Sawyer (1917 film) =

1917 comedy-drama film directed by William Desmond Taylor

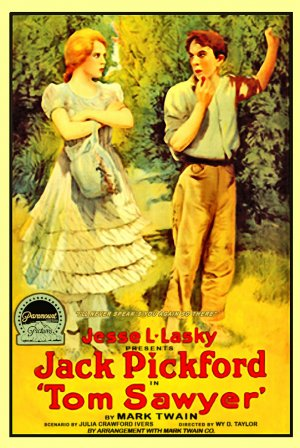
- Theatrical poster
- Directed by: William Desmond Taylor
- Screenplay by: Julia Crawford Ivers
- Based on: The Adventures of Tom Sawyer; 1876 novel by Mark Twain
- Produced by: Jesse L. Lasky
- Starring: Jack Pickford; Robert Gordon
- Cinematography: Homer Scott (uncredited)
- Distributed by: Paramount Pictures
- Release date: December 10, 1917 (United States)
- Running time: 59 minutes 44 minutes (2000 alternate version)
- Country: United States
- Language: Silent (English intertitles)

Tom Sawyer

Tom Sawyer is a 1917 American silent comedy-drama/adventure film starring Jack Pickford, Robert Gordon, and Clara Horton; it is based on Mark Twain's 1876 novel The Adventures of Tom Sawyer. Directed by William Desmond Taylor, the film was released by Paramount Pictures.

== Plot ==
Mischievous Tom Sawyer snacks on jam and is caught by his stern Aunt Polly. She threatens to punish him, but he tricks her and escapes. In town, Tom encounters Alfred Temple, a "model boy" in fancy clothes, who snubs him. A fist-fight ensues, witnessed by Huckleberry Finn, "the juvenile pariah of the village," who wears rags, smokes a pipe and spends his days fishing.

The next day, Aunt Polly commands Tom to whitewash the fence outside their house. Tom successfully fools his friend, Joe Harper, into picking up a brush by pretending the work is actually great fun. Several other boys join in and soon the fence is finished. Becky Thatcher, a new arrival in town, catches Tom's eye and he is instantly smitten. At Widder Douglas' Sunday School, Tom plans to impress Becky by collecting a new Bible for the hundreds of verses he has supposedly learned; actually, he makes shrewd trades with his classmates to amass the number of tickets required to claim the prize. When Judge Thatcher asks Tom to name the first two disciples appointed by Jesus, Tom responds, "David and Goliath," and everyone ridicules him.

The next morning, Tom is tardy for school after stopping to talk with Huck. The schoolmaster makes Tom sit with the girls, which allows Tom a chance to flirt with Becky. Tom proposes engagement to Becky and she accepts with a kiss—until Tom lets it slip he was previously engaged to Amy Lawrence. Becky is furious and refuses to have anything to do with Tom. After Aunt Polly blames Tom for breaking the sugar bowl that was actually destroyed by Tom's goody-goody half-brother, Sid, Tom has had all he can take; He decides to run away. Joe Harper, who also feels depressed, joins him, and the two seek out Huck, who has access to a raft that can take them to Jackson's Island.

That night, the three sail to the island, intending to be pirates. The town is in an uproar when it's discovered the boys have disappeared. Their raft drifts away and is found by a boat captain, who reports to Aunt Polly and Mrs. Harper that the boys must have drowned. The women are heartbroken. Meanwhile, the runaways are swimming, fishing and enjoying their new-found freedom. Huck lights his pipe and blows a cloud of smoke at Tom, tempting him to try smoking. Tom and Joe enjoy their first pipes and plan to surprise their friends with their new skill when they return home. But they eventually make themselves nauseous, much to Huck's amusement. That night, Tom sneaks back to his home and overhears Aunt Polly and Mrs. Harper discussing plans for a funeral service on Sunday. Tom, Huck and Joe make plans to attend the funeral and, when they appear, everyone rejoices. The Widder Douglas takes an interest in Huck, but he manages to slip away from her. Becky reconciles with Tom and the congregation celebrates.

== Cast ==
Actor	Role
Jack Pickford	Tom Sawyer
Robert Gordon	Huckleberry Finn
Helen Gilmore	Widow Douglas
Clara Horton	Becky Thatcher
Edythe Chapman	Aunt Polly
Antrim Short	Joe Harper
George Hackathorne	Sid Sawyer
Carl Goetz	Alfred Temple
Olive Thomas	Choir member (uncredited)

== Production notes ==
Tom Sawyer was filmed on location in St. Petersburg and Hannibal, Missouri in September 1917.

== Sequel ==
The same cast reunited the following year for Huck and Tom, which covers Tom and Huck's witnessing of a murder by Injun Joe and their hunt for treasure.

== Home media ==
The film was released on DVD in 2000 by the Library of Moving Images, and again in 2006 by Unknown Video.

== See also ==
- List of American films of 1917
