= Play Square =

1921 film

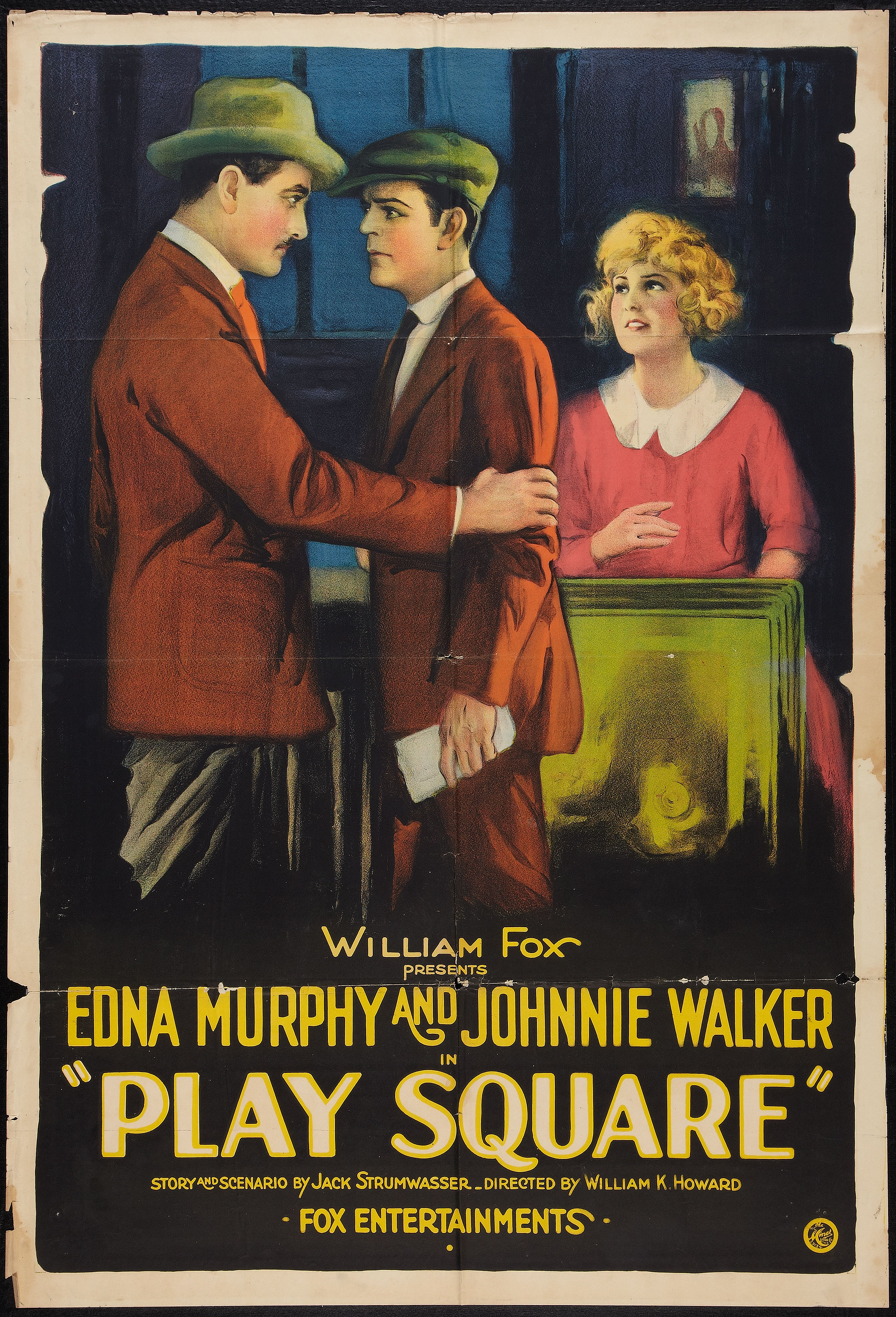
- Directed by: William K. Howard
- Written by: John Stone
- Produced by: William Fox
- Starring: Johnnie Walker; Edna Murphy; Laura La Plante
- Cinematography: Victor Milner
- Production company: Fox Film Corporation
- Distributed by: Fox Film Corporation
- Release date: August 14, 1921
- Running time: 50 minutes
- Country: United States
- Languages: Silent; English intertitles

Play Square is a 1921 American silent drama film directed by William K. Howard and starring Johnnie Walker, Edna Murphy and Laura La Plante.

== Cast ==
- Johnnie Walker as Johnny Carroll
- Edna Murphy as Betty Bedford
- Hayward Mack as Bill Homer
- Laura La Plante as May Laverne
- Jack Brammall as Reddy
- Wilbur Higby as Judge Kerrigan
- Nanine Wright a s Johnny's Mother
- Harry Todd as Betty's Father
- Al Fremont as Detective McQuade

== Bibliography ==
- Connelly, Robert B. The Silents: Silent Feature Films, 1910-36, Volume 40, Issue 2. December Press, 1998.
- Munden, Kenneth White. The American Film Institute Catalog of Motion Pictures Produced in the United States, Part 1. University of California Press, 1997.
- Solomon, Aubrey. The Fox Film Corporation, 1915-1935: A History and Filmography. McFarland, 2011.
