= The Forbidden Valley =

1920 film

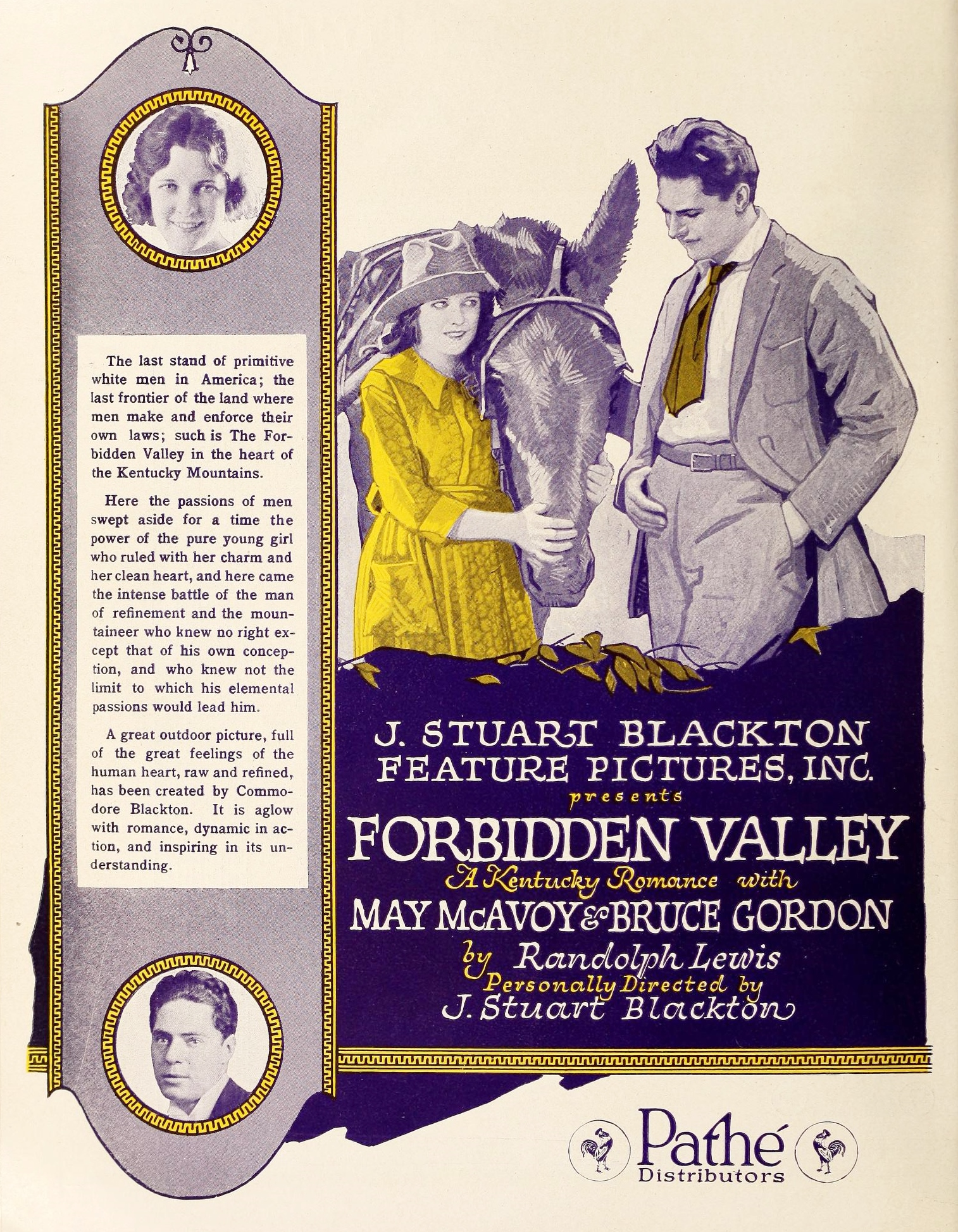
- Directed by: J. Stuart Blackton
- Written by: Randolph Lewis; Stanley Olmstead
- Produced by: J. Stuart Blackton
- Starring: May McAvoy; Bruce Gordon; William R. Dunn
- Cinematography: William S. Adams
- Production company: J. Stuart Blackton Feature Pictures
- Distributed by: Pathé Exchange
- Release date: October 10, 1920
- Running time: 50 minutes
- Country: United States
- Languages: Silent; English intertitles

The Forbidden Valley is a 1920 American silent drama romance film directed by J. Stuart Blackton and starring May McAvoy, Bruce Gordon and William R. Dunn.

== Cast ==
- May McAvoy as Morning Glory
- Bruce Gordon as Jack Winslow
- William R. Dunn as Dave
- Charles Kent as Ben Lee
- Warren Chandler as Dominie Jones
- Nellie Anderson as Aunt Endor
- Gene Layman as Sentimental Joe
- Emil Link as Cal Mitchell
- Harry Kiefer as His Son

== Bibliography ==
- Connelly, Robert B. The Silents: Silent Feature Films, 1910-36, Volume 40, Issue 2. December Press, 1998.
- Munden, Kenneth White. The American Film Institute Catalog of Motion Pictures Produced in the United States, Part 1. University of California Press, 1997.
