= May McAvoy =

American actress (1899–1984)

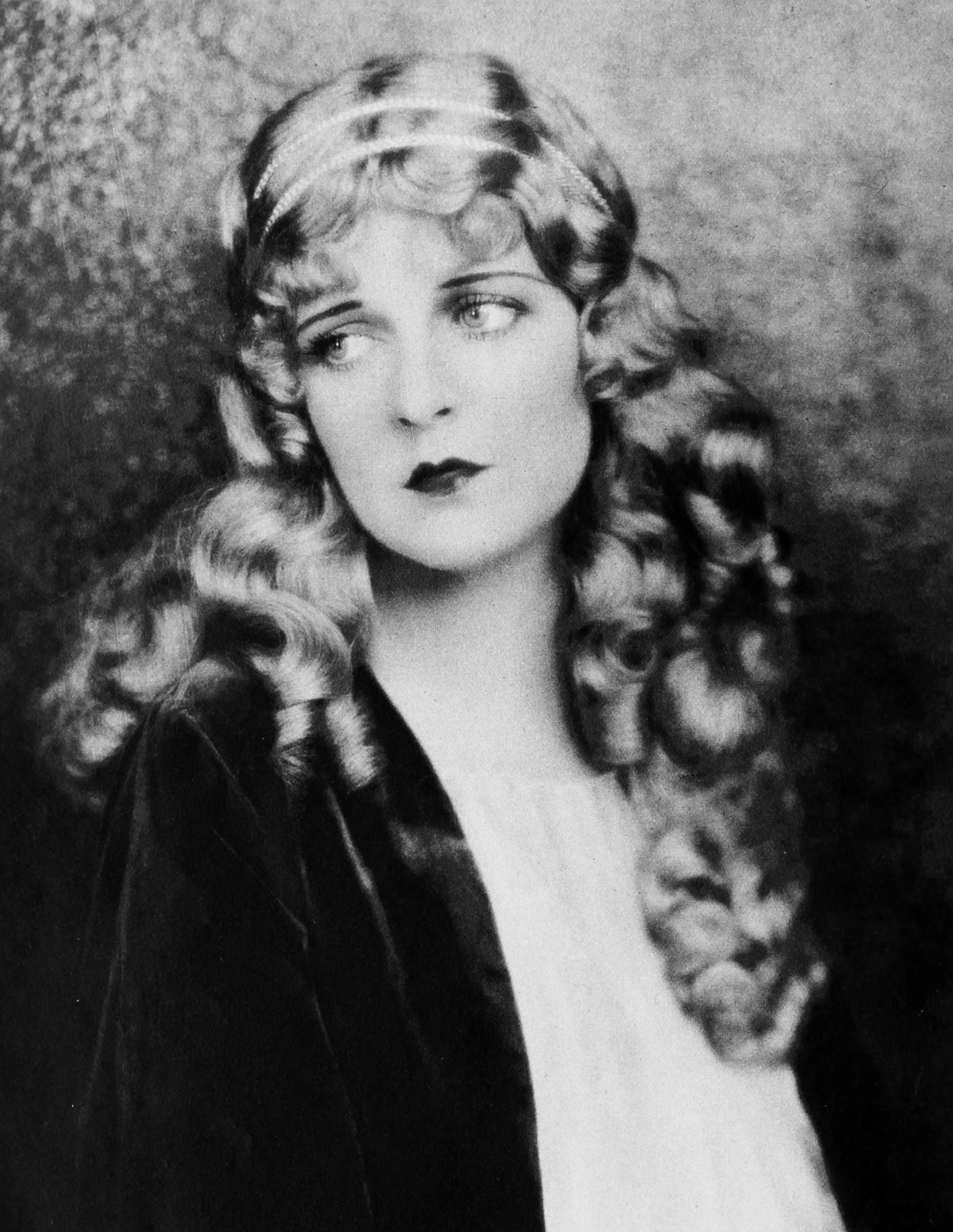
- McAvoy in 1924
- Born: May Irene McAvoy; September 8, 1899; New York City, U.S.
- Died: April 26, 1984 (aged 84); Los Angeles, California, U.S.
- Resting place: Holy Cross Cemetery, Culver City, California, U.S.
- Occupation: Actress
- Years active: 1917–1959
- Spouses: Maurice Cleary (m. 1929; div. 1940) (m. 1971)
- Children: 1

May Irene McAvoy (September 8, 1899 – April 26, 1984) was an American actress who worked mainly during the silent-film era. Some of her major roles are Laura Pennington in The Enchanted Cottage, Esther in Ben-Hur, and Mary Dale in The Jazz Singer.

== Life and career ==
May Irene McAvoy was born on September 8, 1899, in New York City to Julia Agnes McAvoy (née Reilly) and James Patrick McAvoy, who were both first generation Irish-Americans. The 1910 census lists her as living with her maternal grandparents in Sussex, New Jersey.

McAvoy debuted as an extra in the film Hate in 1917. After appearing in more than three dozen films, she co-starred with Ramón Novarro and Francis X. Bushman in director Fred Niblo's 1925 production of Ben-Hur released by MGM. She also portrayed Lady Windermere in Ernst Lubitsch's Lady Windermere's Fan (1925).

In addition to acting in The Jazz Singer, McAvoy coached Al Jolson as he made his film debut. Although her voice was not heard in The Jazz Singer, she spoke in several other films, including the second sound film released by Warner Brothers, The Terror, which was directed by Roy Del Ruth and co-starred Conrad Nagel.

For years, a rumor circulated that McAvoy retired from the screen at the transition to sound films because of a lisp or speech impediment. In truth, she married the treasurer of United Artists, who asked her not to work.

Later, she returned to films and played small, uncredited roles during the 1940s and 1950s, making her final film appearance in a small part of the 1959 version of Ben-Hur. Most of her later uncredited work was performed for MGM.

McAvoy was the Rose Queen in the Rose Parade in 1923.

== Personal life ==
McAvoy married banker Maurice Cleary on June 26, 1929, with whom she had a son named Patrick, and divorced him in 1940. They remarried on December 10, 1971.

== Death ==
On April 26, 1984, McAvoy died at the age of 84 from the after effects of a heart attack suffered the previous year. She is interred in the Holy Cross Cemetery in Culver City, California.

For her contribution to the motion picture industry, May McAvoy has a star on the Hollywood Walk of Fame at 1731 Vine Street.

== Filmography ==
1917-1929

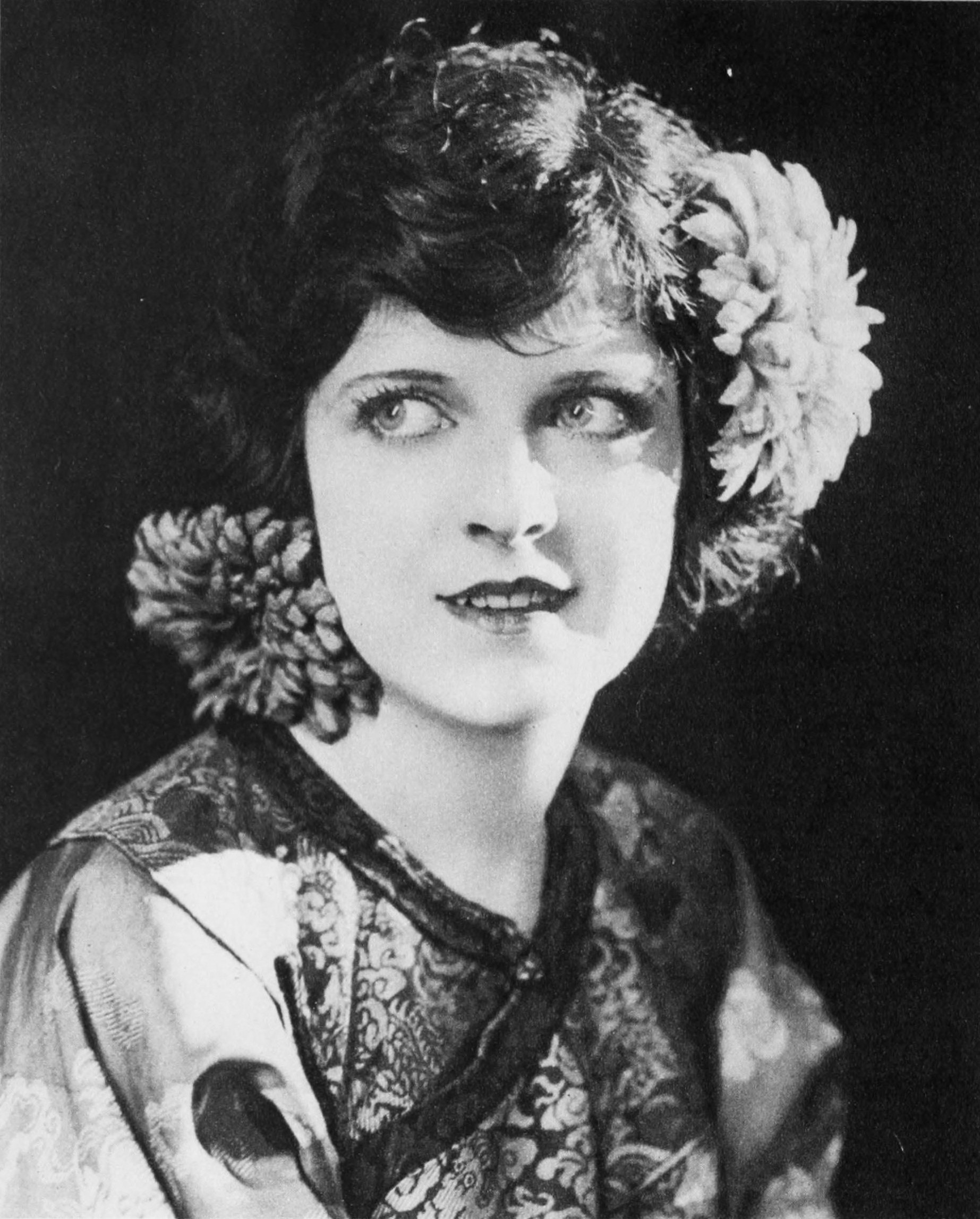
McAvoy in 1922

Year	Title	Role	Studio(s) / Distributor(s)	Notes
1917	Hate	May Garvan		
1918	To Hell with the Kaiser!	Wounded Girl	Metro Pictures	Lost film
1918	A Perfect Lady	Claire Higgins		
1918	I'll Say So	Minor Role		uncredited
1919	Mrs. Wiggs of the Cabbage Patch	Australy Wiggs	Famous Players Lasky	Preserved at the Library of Congress
1919	The Woman Under Oath	Edith Norton	United Picture Theatres of America	A copy is held at the BFI National Archive
1919	Love Wins			
1919	The Way of a Woman	Grace Lee	Select Pictures	A copy is held at the BFI National Archive
1920	My Husband's Other Wife	Nettie Bryson	Pathé Exchange	Lost film
1920	The Sporting Duchess	Mary Aylmer	Vitagraph Studios	Lost film
1920	Man and His Woman	Eve Cartier	Pathé Exchange	Lost film
1920	The House of the Tolling Bell	Lucy Atheron	Pathé Exchange	Lost film
1920	The Forbidden Valley	Morning Glory	Pathé Exchange	Lost film
1920	The Devil's Garden	Norah	First National	Lost film
1920	The Truth About Husbands	Leslie Brownell	First National	Lost film
1921	Sentimental Tommy	Grizel	Paramount Pictures	Lost film
1921	A Private Scandal	Jeanne Millett	Realart Pictures Corporation	Lost film
1921	Everything for Sale	Helen Wainwright	Paramount Pictures	Lost film
1921	Morals	Carlotta	Paramount Pictures	A copy is preserved at the Library of Congress
1921	A Virginia Courtship	Prudence Fairfax	Paramount Pictures	Lost film
1922	A Homespun Vamp	Meg Mackenzie	Paramount Pictures	Lost film
1922	Through a Glass Window	Jenny Martin	Paramount Pictures	Lost film
1922	The Top of New York	Hilda O'Shaunnessey	Paramount Pictures	Lost film
1922	A Trip to Paramountown	Herself	Paramount Pictures	Short subject
1922	Clarence	Cora Wheeler	Paramount Pictures	Lost film
1922	Kick In	Myrtle	Paramount Pictures	A copy is held at the Library of Congress
1923	Grumpy	Virginia Bullivant	Paramount Pictures	A copy is held at the Gosfilmofond archive
1923	Only 38	Lucy Stanley	Paramount Pictures	Lost film
1923	Her Reputation	Jacqueline Lanier	First National	Lost film
1923	Hollywood	Herself	Paramount Pictures	Lost film
1923	West of the Water Tower	Bee Chew	Paramount Pictures	Lost film
1924	The Enchanted Cottage	Laura Pennington	First National	Preserved at the Library of Congress
1924	The Bedroom Window	Ruth Martin	Paramount Pictures	Copies are held at the Library of Congress and the UCLA Film and Television Archive
1924	Tarnish	Letitia Tevis	First National	Lost film
1924	Three Women	Jeannie Wilton	Warner Bros.	
1924	Married Flirts	Herself, Guest at party	Metro-Goldwyn-Mayer	Lost film
1925	The Mad Whirl	Cathleen Gillis	Universal Pictures	
1925	Tessie	Tessie	Arrow Film Corporation	Lost film
1925	Ben-Hur	Esther	Metro-Goldwyn-Mayer	
1925	Lady Windermere's Fan	Lady Windermere	Warner Bros.	
1926	Calf-Love			Short subject
1926	The Road to Glory	Judith Allen	Fox Film Corporation	Lost film
1926	My Old Dutch	Sal Gratton	Universal Pictures	A copy is held at Indiana University
1926	The Passionate Quest	Rosina Vonet	Warner Bros.	Lost film
1926	The Savage	Ysabel Atwater	First National	Lost film
1926	The Fire Brigade	Helen Corwin	Metro-Goldwyn-Mayer	A copy is held at the Metro-Goldwyn-Mayer/United Artists archives Originally contained two-color Technicolor sequences
1927	Matinee Ladies	Sallie Smith	Warner Bros.	Lost film
1927	Irish Hearts	Sheila	Warner Bros.	Lost film
1927	Slightly Used	Cynthia Martin	Warner Bros.	Lost film
1927	The Jazz Singer	Mary Dale	Warner Bros.	
1927	A Reno Divorce	Carla	Warner Bros.	Lost film Vitaphone discs survive
1927	If I Were Single	May Howard	Warner Bros.	A copy is held at the BFI National Archive
1928	The Little Snob	May Banks	Warner Bros.	An incomplete copy is held at the UCLA Film and Television Archive
1928	Sunny California			Short subject
1928	The Lion and the Mouse	Shirley Ross	Warner Bros.	Copies are held at the Library of Congress and at the University of Wisconsin-Madison The Vitaphone soundtracks partially survive at the UCLA Film and Television Archive
1928	Caught in the Fog	The Girl	Warner Bros.	An incomplete copy is held at the BFI National Archive
1928	The Terror	Olga Redmayne	Warner Bros.	A silent and talking version were both released and both are now lost. Vitaphone soundtracks survive
1929	Stolen Kisses	May Lambert	Warner Bros.	Lost film
1929	No Defense	Ruth Harper	Warner Bros.	Lost film

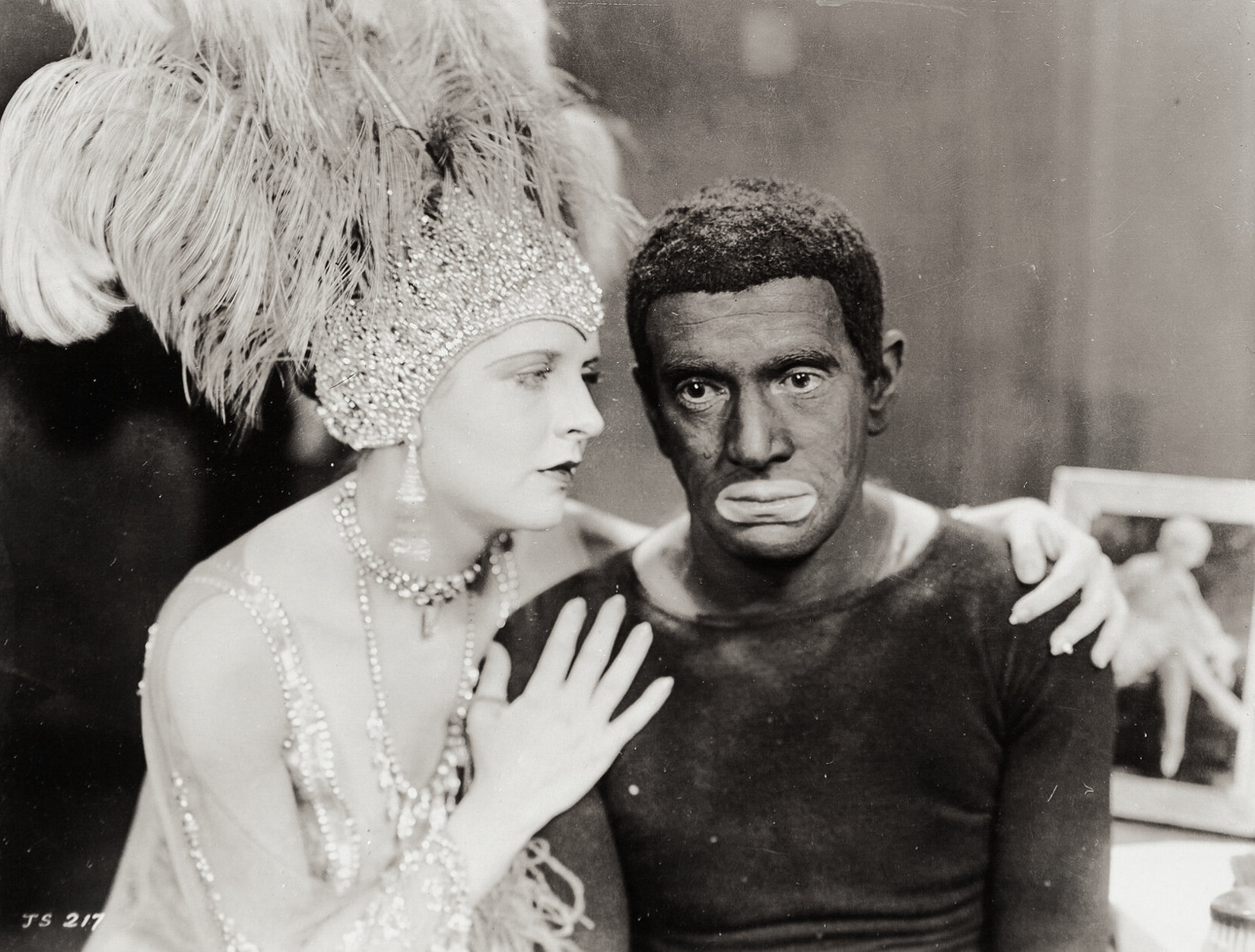
With Al Jolson in The Jazz Singer (1927)

1940-1959

Year	Title	Role	Notes
1940	Hollywood: Style Center of the World	Saleslady	Short subject
1940	Two Girls on Broadway	Chatworth's Secretary	Uncredited
1940	The New Pupil	Sally's mother	Short subject
1940	The Phantom Raiders	Middle Telephone Operator	Uncredited
1940	Dulcy	Miss Murphy - Van Dyke's Secretary	Uncredited
1940	Third Finger, Left Hand	Telephone Operator	Uncredited
1941	Whispers	Gossip	Short subject Uncredited
1941	1-2-3 Go!	Miss Jones, nurse	Short subject
1941	Love Crazy	Sanity Hearing Secretary	Uncredited
1941	The Getaway	Duff's Secretary	Uncredited
1941	Ringside Maisie	1st Nurse	Uncredited
1941	Main Street on the March!	Window Shopper	Short subject Uncredited
1942	Born to Sing	Bit role	Uncredited
1942	Mr. Blabbermouth!	Wife	Short subject Uncredited
1943	Assignment in Brittany	Nurse	Uncredited
1943	My Tomato	Gidge's Customer	Short subject Uncredited
1944	Two Girls and a Sailor	Dowager	Uncredited
1944	Movie Pests	Woman Whose Vision Gets Blocked	Short subject Uncredited
1944	Barbary Coast Gent	Bit role	Scenes deleted
1945	Week-End at the Waldorf	Bit role	Uncredited
1946	Till the Clouds Roll By	Well-Wisher after Roberta	Uncredited
1947	The Romance of Rosy Ridge	Wife	Uncredited
1947	The Unfinished Dance	Ronsell's Secretary	Uncredited
1948	A Date with Judy	Dance Attendee	Uncredited
1948	Luxury Liner	Woman	Uncredited
1950	The Yellow Cab Man	Bit role	Uncredited
1950	Mystery Street	Nurse	Uncredited
1950	Watch the Birdie	Bit role	Uncredited
1952	The Bad and the Beautiful	Pebbel's Secretary	Uncredited
1954	Executive Suite	Grimm's Secretary	Uncredited
1955	The Tender Trap	Visitor to Home Show	Uncredited
1956	Ransom!	Miss May	Uncredited
1957	The Wings of Eagles	Nurse	Uncredited
1957	Designing Woman	Boston Wardrobe Woman	Uncredited
1957	Gun Glory	Woman	Uncredited
1957	Jailhouse Rock	Bit role	Uncredited
1959	Ben-Hur	Woman in Crowd	Uncredited
