= The Road to Glory (1926 film) =

1926 film by Howard Hawks

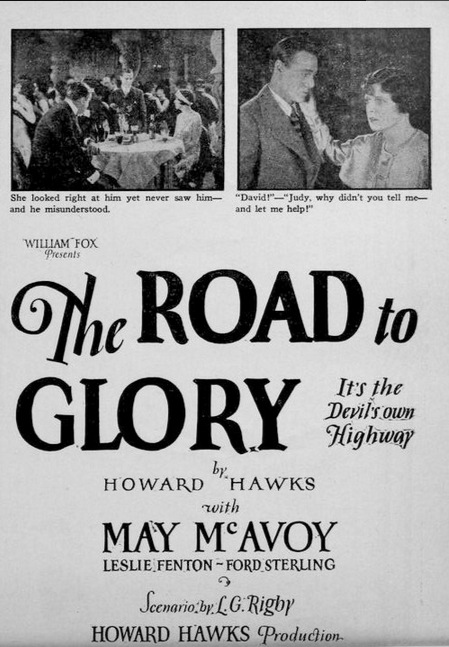
- Advertisement
- Directed by: Howard Hawks
- Written by: Howard Hawks; Gordon Rigby
- Starring: May McAvoy; Leslie Fenton; Ford Sterling
- Cinematography: Joseph H. August
- Production company: Fox Film Corporation
- Distributed by: Fox Film Corporation
- Release date: February 7, 1926
- Running time: 93 minutes
- Country: United States
- Languages: Silent; English intertitles

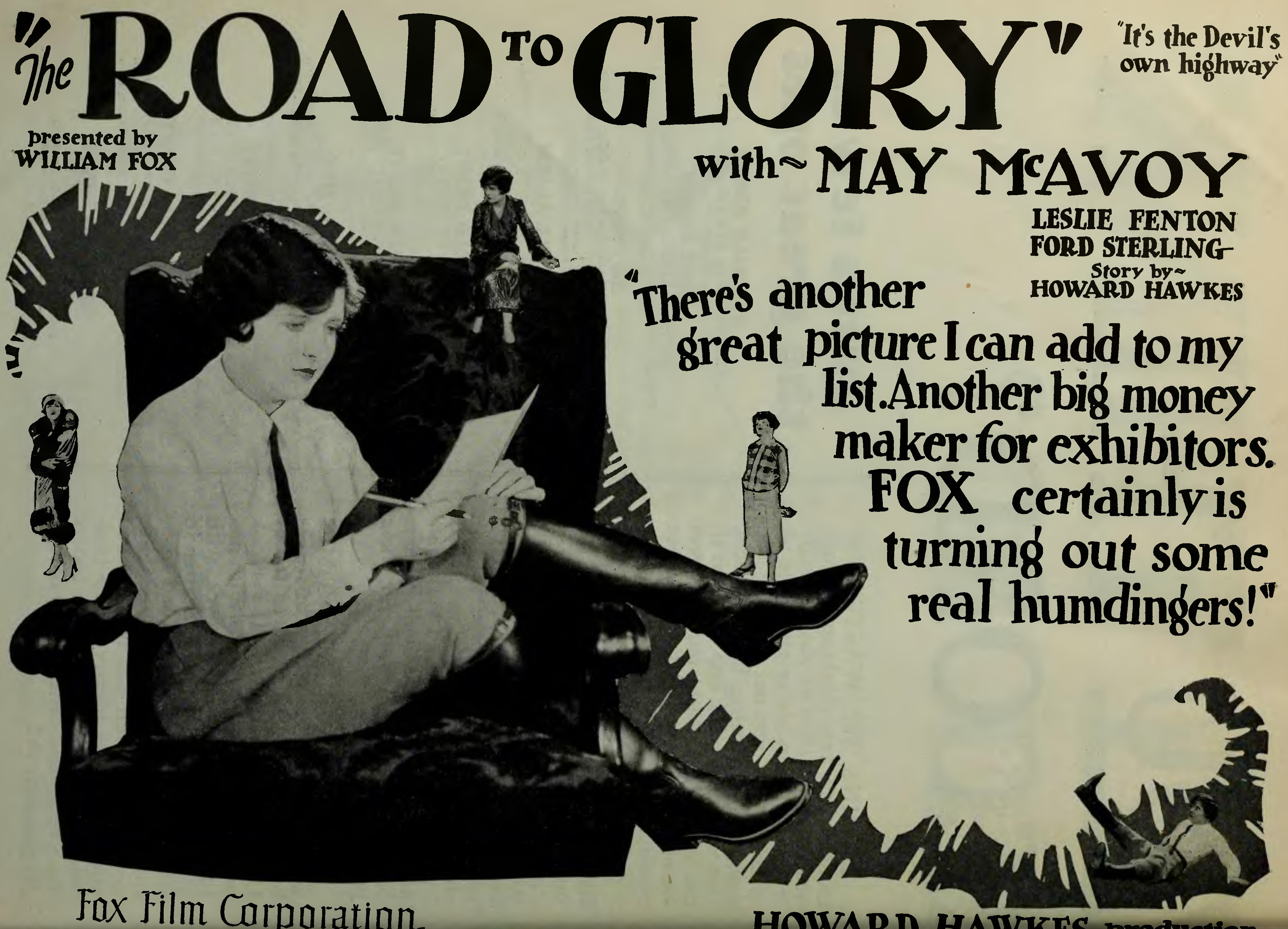
The Road to Glory ad in The Film Daily, 1926

The Road to Glory is a 1926 American silent drama film directed by Howard Hawks and starring May McAvoy, Leslie Fenton, and Ford Sterling. This was Hawks' first film, based on a 35-page treatment that Hawks wrote. It is one of only two Hawks works that are lost films.

== Plot ==
As described in a film magazine review, in an automobile accident David Hale is uninjured, but his sweetheart Judith Allen sustains a slight bump to the head. Her father is accidentally killed. While at a cabaret with another suitor, Del Cole, Judith suddenly goes blind as a result of the head injury. She loses her faith in God and makes a break with David. David seeks her out again. A storm wrecks the house and both are hurt, but Judith only slightly. While at David's bedside, the shock suddenly restores her sight. They face a happy future together.

== Cast ==
- May McAvoy as Judith Allen
- Leslie Fenton as David Hale
- Ford Sterling as James Allen
- Rockliffe Fellowes as Del Cole
- Milla Davenport as Aunt Selma
- John MacSweeney as Butler
- Carole Lombard

== Production ==
Howard Hawks wrote the 35 page story from which the screenplay was based; this was one of few films on which he had extensive writing credits. Originally titled, The Chariot of the Gods, The Road to Glory was shot from December 1925 to January 1926 and premiered in April. The film contained religious iconography and messages that would never again be seen in a Hawks film.

== Reception ==
The film received good reviews from film critics. In later interviews, Hawks said, "It didn't have any fun in it. It was pretty bad. I don't think anybody enjoyed it except a few critics." Hawks was dissatisfied with the film after being certain that dramatic films would establish his reputation, but realized what he had done wrong when Sol Wurtzel told Hawks, "Look, you've shown you can make a picture, but for God's sake, go out and make entertainment."

== See also ==
- 1937 Fox vault fire

== Preservation status ==
With no prints of The Road to Glory located in any film archives, it is a lost film.

== Bibliography ==
- Wes D. Gehring. Carole Lombard, the Hoosier Tornado. Indiana Historical Society Press, 2003. ISBN 978-0-8719-5167-0
