= Stunt flying =

Stunts performed in an aircraft

Stunt flying refers to any stunts performed in an aircraft. It encompasses aerobatics, wing walking, and transferring from one airplane to another or to a moving vehicle on the ground, such as an automobile or train, and vice versa.

== History ==
=== From the Wright brothers to World War I ===
The Wright brothers showed that motor-powered flight was possible, with their first sustained flight on 17 December 1903. Aerobatics followed within a decade. Frenchman Adolphe Pégoud was the first to fly inverted, on 1 September 1913. On 9 September, Russian Pyotr Nesterov flew the first loop. World War I (1914–1918) was a major impetus to the development of aerobatics. Those who mastered it were more likely to survive dogfights.

=== The 1920s: era of the barnstormer ===
After the war ended, some of these pilots used the skills they had mastered by barnstorming to earn a living, traveling across the country performing stunts and providing rides. It was helpful that the US government was selling plentiful, now-surplus Curtiss JN-4 Jenny trainer biplanes for as little as $200; 90% of American World War I pilots had been trained using the Jenny. It was a two-seater, so paying passengers could get their first taste of flying and wing walkers had a place to wait to perform. Barnstormers would often land in a local farmer's field and negotiate to put on a show there, hence the "barn" in barnstorming.

Barnstormers worked individually or in groups called "flying circuses". Probably the most successful of these was the Gates Flying Circus, founded by Ivan R. Gates or Gates and Clyde Pangborn in 1921.

Employment was also available in movies. The public's fascination with aviation translated into a demand for films involving flying, with their attendant stunts.

Inevitably, barnstormers attempted more and more dangerous stunts to outdo their competitors, resulting in numerous fatalities and injuries. Eventually, the federal government stepped in to regulate aviation, bringing about the end of barnstorming.

=== Aerobatics ===
==== Aerobatic teams ====
The first military aerobatics team was the Patrouille de France, formed in 1931. Other nations' militaries and a few civilian organizations followed suit; see List of air display teams.

== Pilots ==
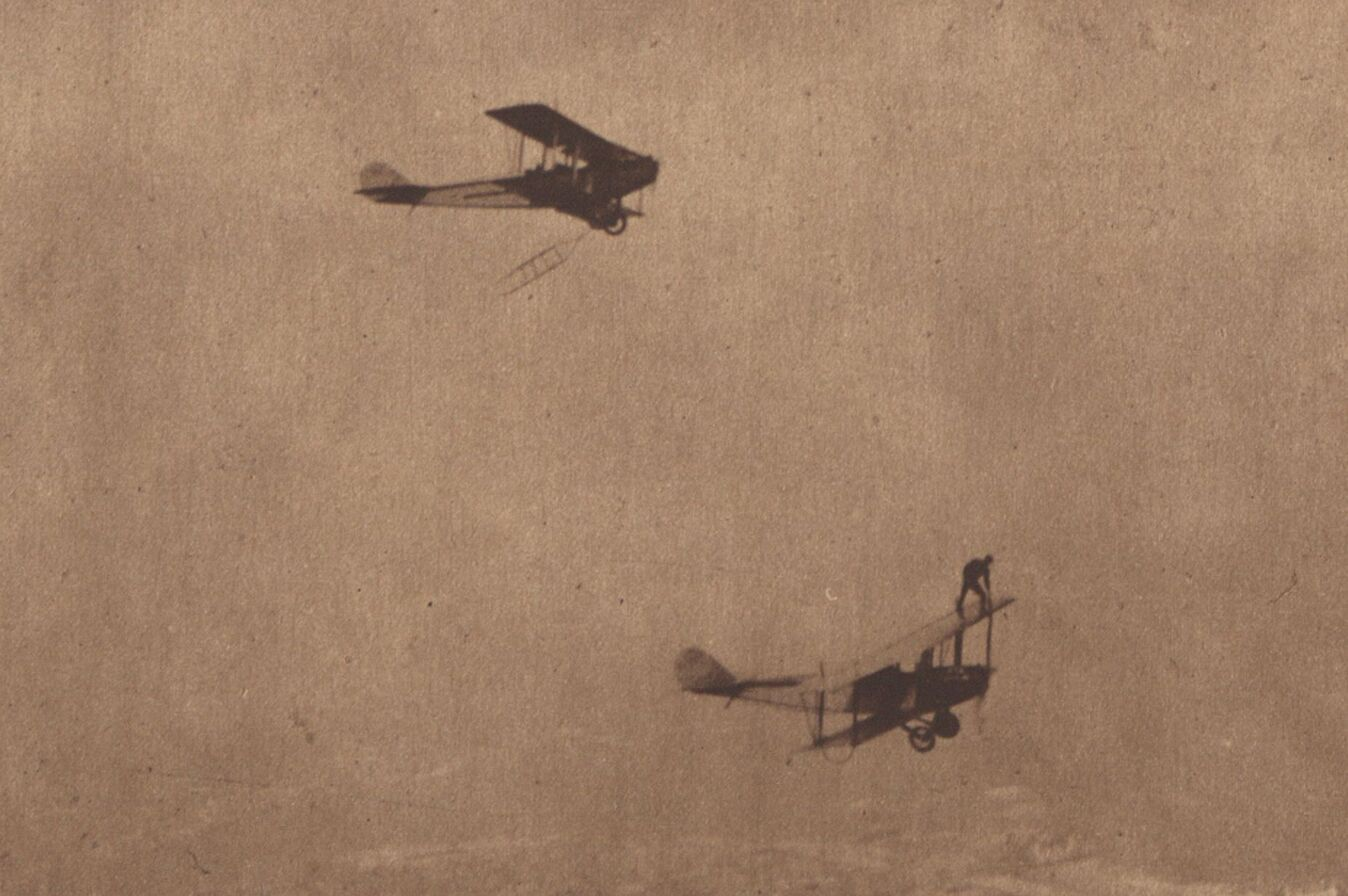
On 1 June 1919 in Atlantic City, Ormer Locklear of Locklear's Flying Circus waited on the top wing of one biplane for a second one trailing a rope ladder.

Ormer Locklear was a pioneer of stunt flying. He joined the United States Army Air Service in October 1917 after the American entry into World War I. Pilot Cadet Locklear was flying with his instructor. He had to interpret a message being flashed to him from the ground to pass a test, but the wing and engine housing blocked his view. So he left the airplane in the hands of his instructor and climbed out onto the wing to read the message, possibly becoming the first wing walker. (He passed the test.) Locklear also perfected such stunts as handstands on the wing. He may have been the first to transfer from one airplane to another in mid-air, in 1919, and from a speeding car to an airplane. He helped develop another standard flying stunt: hanging onto a trapeze or rope ladder with just his teeth. He starred in the 1919 film The Great Air Robbery, in which he performed a mid-air transfer, as well as climbing down into a car. Locklear also headlined the 1920 film The Skywayman, but did not live to see it released. A nighttime stunt went fatally awry. On 2 August 1920, he and co-pilot Milton "Skeets" Elliot were to spiral down perilously close to the ground. The scene was illuminated by searchlights, which were supposed to be turned off when they got as low as was safe to let the pilots know when to pull up. However, the lights were not extinguished, and both men were killed in the ensuing crash.

Other noted stunt pilots include:

- Pancho Barnes (1901–1975), the first female Hollywood stunt pilot and the organizer of the Associated Motion Picture Pilots union
- Lincoln Beachey (1887–1915)
- Frank Clarke (1898–1948)
- Bessie Coleman (1892–1926), the first African-American woman and first Native American to hold a pilot's license
- B. H. DeLay (1891–1923), American pioneer of many of the popular stunts used in the early barnstorming air shows
- Dick Grace (1898–1965), one of the few to die in bed, despite breaking over 80 bones and his neck
- Eugène Lefebvre (1878–1909), reportedly the first stunt pilot
- Charles Lindbergh (1902–1974), a barnstormer, wing walker and parachutist in his early days
- Paul Mantz (1903–1965) and Frank Tallman (1919–1978), also cofounders of Tallmantz Aviation, which provided pilots and equipment for movies and television
- Clyde Pangborn (c. 1895–1958)

== Films ==
- Stunt Pilot (1939)
- Ace Eli and Rodger of the Skies (1973)
- The Great Waldo Pepper (1979), starring Robert Redford
- Cloud Dancer (1980), starring David Carradine
