= The Great Waldo Pepper =

1975 film by George Roy Hill

- Theatrical release poster by Gary Meyer
- Directed by: George Roy Hill
- Screenplay by: William Goldman
- Story by: George Roy Hill
- Produced by: George Roy Hill
- Starring: Robert Redford; Bo Svenson; Margot Kidder; Bo Brundin; Susan Sarandon
- Cinematography: Robert Surtees
- Edited by: William H. Reynolds
- Music by: Henry Mancini
- Color process: Technicolor
- Production company: Universal Pictures
- Distributed by: Universal Pictures
- Release date: March 13, 1975
- Running time: 107 minutes
- Country: United States
- Language: English
- Budget: $5 million
- Box office: $20,642,922

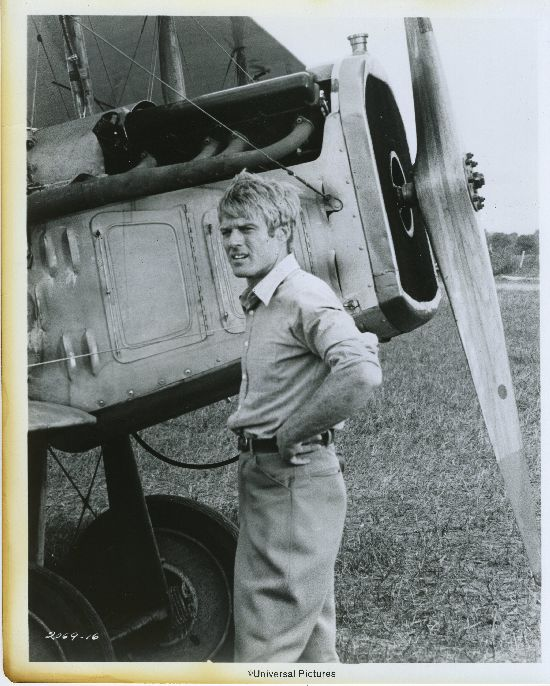
Redford in The Great Waldo Pepper, standing by the nose of a Standard J-1 biplane used in the movie.

The Great Waldo Pepper is a 1975 American drama film directed, produced, and co-written by George Roy Hill. Set during 1926–1931, the film stars Robert Redford as a disaffected World War I veteran pilot who missed the opportunity to fly in combat, and examines his sense of postwar dislocation in 1920s America. The cast includes Margot Kidder, Bo Svenson, Edward Herrmann and Susan Sarandon. The Great Waldo Pepper depicts barnstorming during the 1920s and the accidents that led to aviation regulations by the Air Commerce Act.

== Plot ==
1926: World War I veteran Waldo Pepper feels he has missed out on the glory of aerial combat after being made a flight instructor. After the war, Waldo had taken up barnstorming to make a living. He soon tangles with rival barnstormer (and fellow war veteran) Axel Olsson.

Antagonistic at first, Waldo and Axel become partners and try out various flying stunts. One of these stunts, a car-to-aircraft transfer, goes wrong and Waldo is nearly killed after Axel is unable to climb high enough to clear a barn, slamming Waldo into it. Waldo goes home to Kansas to be with on-again, off-again girlfriend Maude and her family. Maude is not happy to see Waldo at first, as every time he returns from a barnstorming tour he is injured in some way. They make up and become lovers once again. Meanwhile, Maude's brother Ezra, a long-time friend of Waldo's since boyhood, promises to build Waldo a high-performance monoplane as soon as he is well enough to fly it. Waldo's goal is to become the first pilot in history to successfully perform an outside loop, and Ezra feels Waldo can do it with the monoplane.

Waldo rejoins Axel, and the two get a job flying for a traveling flying circus owned by Doc Dillhoefer. Dillhoefer's Flying Circus is in a slump, as there is very little attendance at the shows. In an effort to attract bigger crowds, Dillhoefer hires Mary Beth to act as the show's new sexy attraction, in which she would climb out on the wing of an aircraft in flight wearing shredded clothes, thus allowing the wind to blow them off. While performing the stunt for the first time, Mary Beth freezes up on the wing, afraid to return to the cockpit. As Waldo (who did a "plane-to-plane transfer" in flight to climb aboard Mary Beth's aircraft) extends his hand to help Mary Beth back into the cockpit, she slips and falls off the wing to her death. As a result of Mary Beth's death, Waldo, Axel, and Dillhoefer are temporarily grounded by an inspector of the newly formed Air Commerce division of the federal government, Newt Potts, a man from Waldo's wartime past.

Soon after, at the Muncie Fair, another tragedy occurs with the Dillhoefer Circus when Ezra (flying in place of the grounded Waldo) attempts the outside loop in the monoplane. He crashes on his third attempt, and the crowd rushes out of the stands to see the wreckage. One of the spectators carelessly flicks a cigarette into gas leaking from the aircraft, igniting it. Waldo kills Ezra with a piece of lumber to spare him the agony of being burned alive. Because no one helped him, Waldo goes on a rampage in one of Dillhoefer's aircraft, buzzing the crowd away from the wreckage. He ends up crashing into a carnival area, which leads to his permanent grounding.

Waldo goes to Hollywood where Axel is working as a stuntman, and Waldo and Axel get jobs as stunt pilots in an upcoming film depicting the air battles of the Great War. Axel has been cleared of his grounding and reinstated as a pilot, but Waldo uses an alias so that he can dodge his grounding and fly in the film. Famous German air ace Ernst Kessler has also been hired by the producers as a consultant and to fly a Fokker Dr. I replica in the film.

During filming of a famous wartime duel, Waldo in a Sopwith Camel and Kessler in the Fokker—although their aircraft are disarmed—begin dogfighting in deadly earnest, using their aircraft as weapons, repeatedly playing chicken and colliding with each other. Eventually, Waldo damages Kessler's aircraft so badly that it is no longer airworthy, and Kessler surrenders to Waldo. Waldo and Kessler then salute each other and fly their separate ways, Waldo unable to land without crashing due to damaged landing gear. As the sound fades, the last shot of the film is of a page in a photo album. One of the pictures is of Waldo, and beneath it is a caption that reads, "Waldo Pepper. 1895–1931."

== Cast ==
- Robert Redford as Waldo Pepper
- Bo Svenson as Axel Olsson
- Bo Brundin as Ernst Kessler
- Susan Sarandon as Mary Beth
- Geoffrey Lewis as Newt
- Edward Herrmann as Ezra Stiles
- Philip Bruns as Dillhoefer
- Roderick Cook as Werfel
- Kelly Jean Peters as Patsy
- Margot Kidder as Maude

== History ==
Waldo Pepper was inspired by a combination of real-life barnstormers, such as Ormer Locklear (1891–1920), Speed Holman (1898–1931), and Earl Daugherty (1887–1928), whose photos appear in the opening credits. Like Pepper, all three pilots died in flying accidents.

Locklear, similarly to Pepper, was a Hollywood stunt pilot. In 1920, he received the first aviation law violation for “reckless aerial driving” while flying over Los Angeles. A daring aviator, military veteran and budding film star, Locklear is reputed to be the main inspiration for the character of Pepper. Locklear died when his aircraft crashed on August 2, 1920, during a nighttime film shoot for the Fox Studios feature, The Skywayman.

The character of Ernst Kessler's depiction as disillusioned, bitter and a heavy drinker is based on the real German WWI fighter pilot, stunt pilot and later Nazi German general Ernst Udet. He was the second-highest scoring German pilot of World War I, and flew as a film and air show stunt pilot between the World Wars.

== Production ==
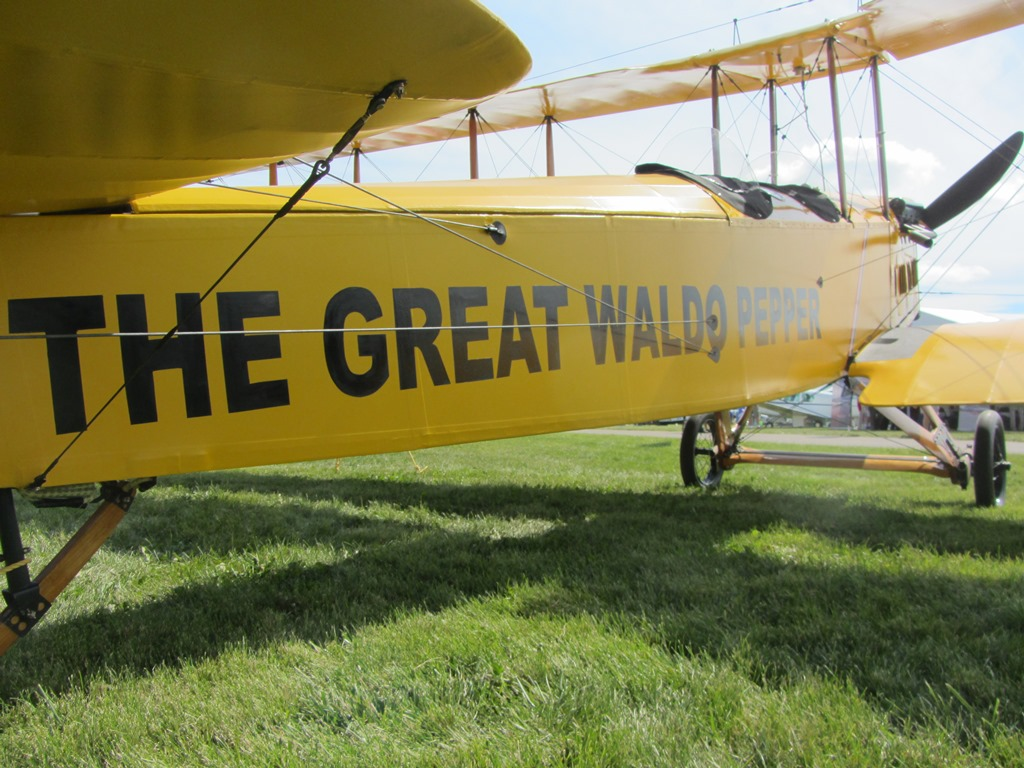
A Standard J-1, with a copy of "The Great Waldo Pepper" paint scheme

The Great Waldo Pepper was a "passion project" for director George Roy Hill, who was himself a pilot. He and William Goldman had what Goldman described as "a huge falling out" during the middle of Goldman's writing the screenplay. Nevertheless, they managed to complete the project.

Frank Tallman flew the air sequences using actual aircraft – not models. Waldo flew a Standard J-1 biplane. Many of the other aircraft in the film, including Axel's and those of Dillhoefer's, were Curtiss JN-4 biplanes. A number of de Havilland Tiger Moth biplanes, modified to look like Curtiss JN-4s, were used for the crash scenes.

The Great Waldo Pepper was filmed in Elgin, Texas. Aerial sequences were filmed at Zuehl Airfield near San Antonio, which is not too far from Fort Sam Houston, where the pioneering silent aviation classic Wings was shot in 1926–27. Several aerial scenes were also filmed over the Sebring Regional Airport in Sebring, Florida. Hill, who flew as a U.S. Marine Corps cargo pilot in World War II, made sure stars Bo Svenson and Robert Redford did each sequence with no parachutes or safety harnesses. He wanted them to feel what it was like to fly vintage aircraft. Fortunately, no one was hurt during the air scenes.

The aerial sequences staged by Frank Tallman included the climactic fight between Waldo Pepper and Kessler. The scene featured a replica Sopwith Camel and a replica Fokker Triplane, the whereabouts of which are unknown. (Note: The aircraft used in The Great Waldo Pepper were displayed at Tallman's Movieland of the Air Museum until it was closed after his death.)

The relationship between Waldo and Kessler includes Waldo's fascination with Kessler's most famous WWI dogfight, which Hill and Goldman loosely patterned after a real dogfight between German ace Werner Voss and a flight of aircraft led by British ace James McCudden.

== Reception ==
=== Box office ===
The film earned $9.4 million at the box office in the U.S. during its year of initial release.

=== Critical ===
The Great Waldo Pepper opened to mixed reviews, with the biggest praise going to the film's aerial sequences. Vincent Canby of The New York Times wrote, "'The Great Waldo Pepper' is a most appealing movie. Its moods don't quite mesh and its aerial sequences are so vivid— sometimes literally breathtaking— that they upstage the human drama, but the total effect is healthily romantic."

Leonard Maltin noted that the film disappointed at the box office, and, although compared to earlier efforts such as The Sting (1973), it was director George Roy Hill's "more personal" account that "... wavers uncomfortably between slapstick and drama."

Former silent screen actress Viola Dana was an honored guest at the premiere of The Great Waldo Pepper. In 1920, Dana had begun a relationship with Ormer "Lock" Locklear. (Note: Although married, Locklear had been dating Dana, and on the night before his death, in a premonition, gave her some of his personal effects. Dana witnessed the 1920 crash and would not fly again for 25 years.)

Due to the attention to period details and the use of actual aircraft in the flying scenes, The Great Waldo Pepper is well-regarded among aviation films, receiving a "four-star" rating by film and aviation historians Jack Hardwick and Ed Schnepf. The film remains connected to the perception of modern barnstorming. In 2021, a Smithsonian Magazine article wrote that barnstorming "is tangled up with real aviation history, dubious tall tales, nostalgia, and old movies such as The Great Waldo Pepper."

On the review aggregator website Rotten Tomatoes, 59% of 69 critics' reviews are positive. The website's consensus reads: "Though it takes the occasional nosedive due to an imbalanced tone and episodic plotting, The Great Waldo Pepper takes flight thanks to its jaw-dropping aerial sequences and Robert Redford's debonair charm."

In 2025, The Hollywood Reporter listed The Great Waldo Pepper as having the best stunts of 1975.

== See also ==
- List of American films of 1975
