= Heart of the West =

Heart of the West may refer to:

- Heart of the West, a 1907 collection of short stories by O. Henry
- Heart of the West, a 1936 screenplay by Doris Schroeder
- Heart of the West (film), a 1936 American Western film directed by Howard Bretherton and starring William Boyd

== See also ==
- Hearts of the West (disambiguation)
- Heart of the Golden West, a 1942 American film
