= The Day She Paid =

1919 film by Rex Ingram

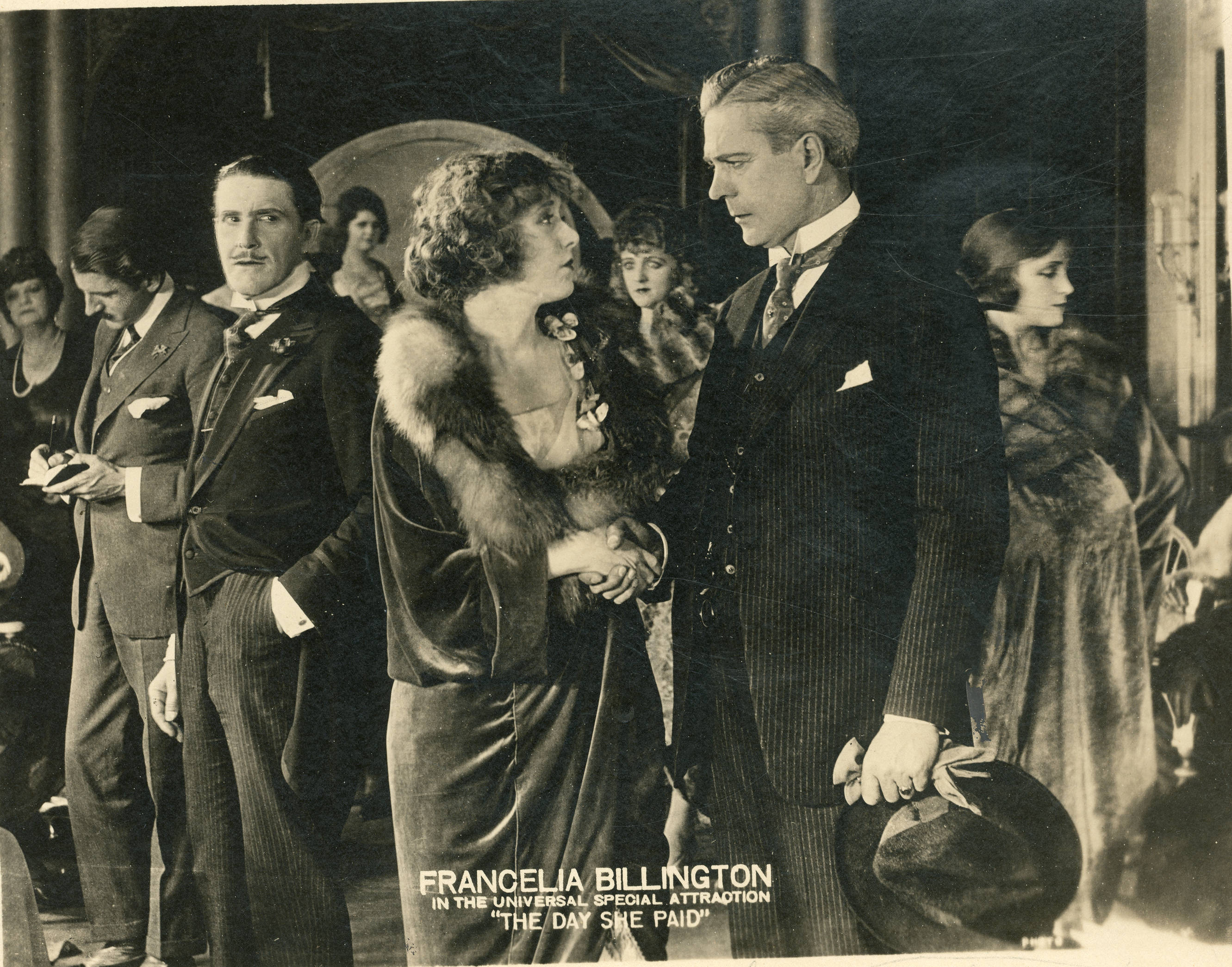
- Still with Francelia Billington and Charles Clary
- Directed by: Rex Ingram
- Written by: Hal Hoadley; J. Clarkson Miller
- Based on: "Oats for the Woman" by Fannie Hurst
- Starring: Francelia Billington; Charles Clary; Harry von Meter
- Cinematography: Stephen Rounds
- Production company: Universal Pictures
- Distributed by: Universal Pictures
- Release date: December 1, 1919
- Running time: 5 reels
- Country: United States
- Language: Silent (English intertitles)

The Day She Paid is a 1919 American silent drama film directed by Rex Ingram and starring Francelia Billington, Charles Clary, and Harry von Meter.

== Plot ==
Set in Manhattan, New York, Marion Buckley receives a marriage proposal from Warren Rogers, a wealthy department store owner. Warren Rogers, however, is a widower with two daughters and has not taken the opportunity to remarry until now. However, Marion Buckley is very hesitant in accepting the marriage proposal, due to the fact that she had an affair with her employer, Leon Kessler and had promised to marry her. But after confronting Kessler with the news of the marriage proposal, he relents and promises to say nothing of the affair. Buckley and Rogers go on to get married, living happily together, until one day Kessler comes to visit, not to expose Buckley about the affair, but rather to ask for Rogers for his daughter, Ardath's, hand in marriage. Unsuspecting of anything, Rogers agrees to the marriage proposal, but in an effort to save Ardath from Kessler, hinting at an abusive relationship previously, Marion intervenes and tells Roger about the affair between the two. This enrages Rogers causing him to throw out Buckley stating that "sowing one's wild oats" is all right for a man, but not for a woman" . After this conflict, Marion decides to become a newspaper reporter in New York City where she encounters Kessler and learns that he is still chasing after Ardath, who is visiting New York with Rogers. In an attempt to save her from Kessler once again, Marion offers herself to him in exchange for him to leave Ardath alone for good. This conversation is heard through the door by Warren, and leads to him not only violently attack Kessler, but also take Marion back home, seemingly forgiving her.

== Cast ==
- Francelia Billington as Marion Buckley
- Charles Clary as Warren Rogers
- Harry von Meter as Leon Kessler
- Lillian Rich as Ardath
- Nancy Caswell as Betty
- Marcel Drageauson as Modiste Assistant
- Miss DuPont
- Alice Terry

== Bibliography ==
- Leonhard Gmür. Rex Ingram: Hollywood's Rebel of the Silver Screen. 2013.
- “AFI CATALOG OF FEATURE FILMS.” AFI, https://catalog.afi.com/Film/17313-THE-DAYSHEPAID?sid=8c54cd8f-67cf-47ad-98ec-9340d9ab9b39&sr=14.666971&cp=1&pos=0.
- “The Day She Paid.” IMDb, IMDb.com, https://www.imdb.com/title/tt0010056/plotsummary?ref_=tt_ov_pl.
