= The Truant Husband =

1921 silent film

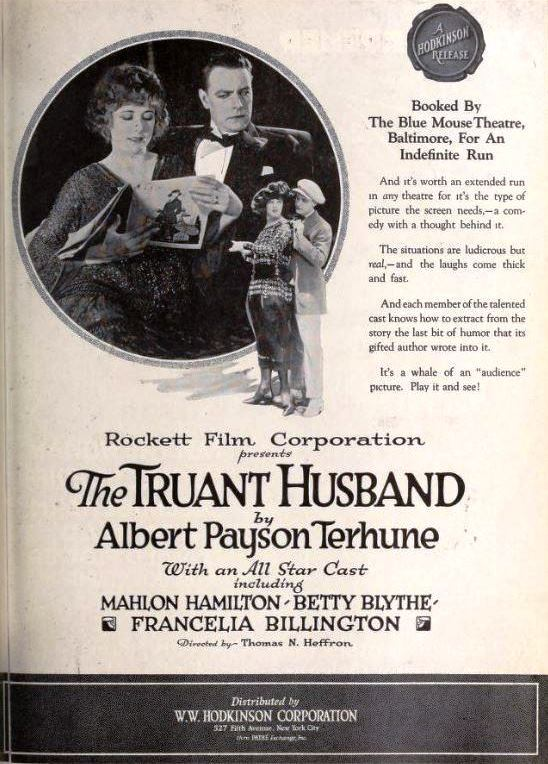
- Directed by: Thomas N. Heffron
- Written by: Albert Payson Terhune
- Starring: Mahlon Hamilton; Betty Blythe; Francelia Billington
- Cinematography: Allen G. Siegler
- Production company: Rockett Film Corporation
- Distributed by: Hodkinson Pictures
- Release date: January 1921
- Running time: 50 minutes
- Country: United States
- Languages: Silent; English intertitles

The Truant Husband is a 1921 American silent comedy film directed by Thomas N. Heffron and starring Mahlon Hamilton, Betty Blythe and Francelia Billington.

== Cast ==
- Mahlon Hamilton as Billy Sayre
- Betty Blythe as Vera Delauney
- Francelia Billington as Sybil Sayre
- Edward Ryan as Bram Woller

== Bibliography ==
- Munden, Kenneth White. The American Film Institute Catalog of Motion Pictures Produced in the United States, Part 1. University of California Press, 1997.
