= Francelia Billington =

American actress and camera operator

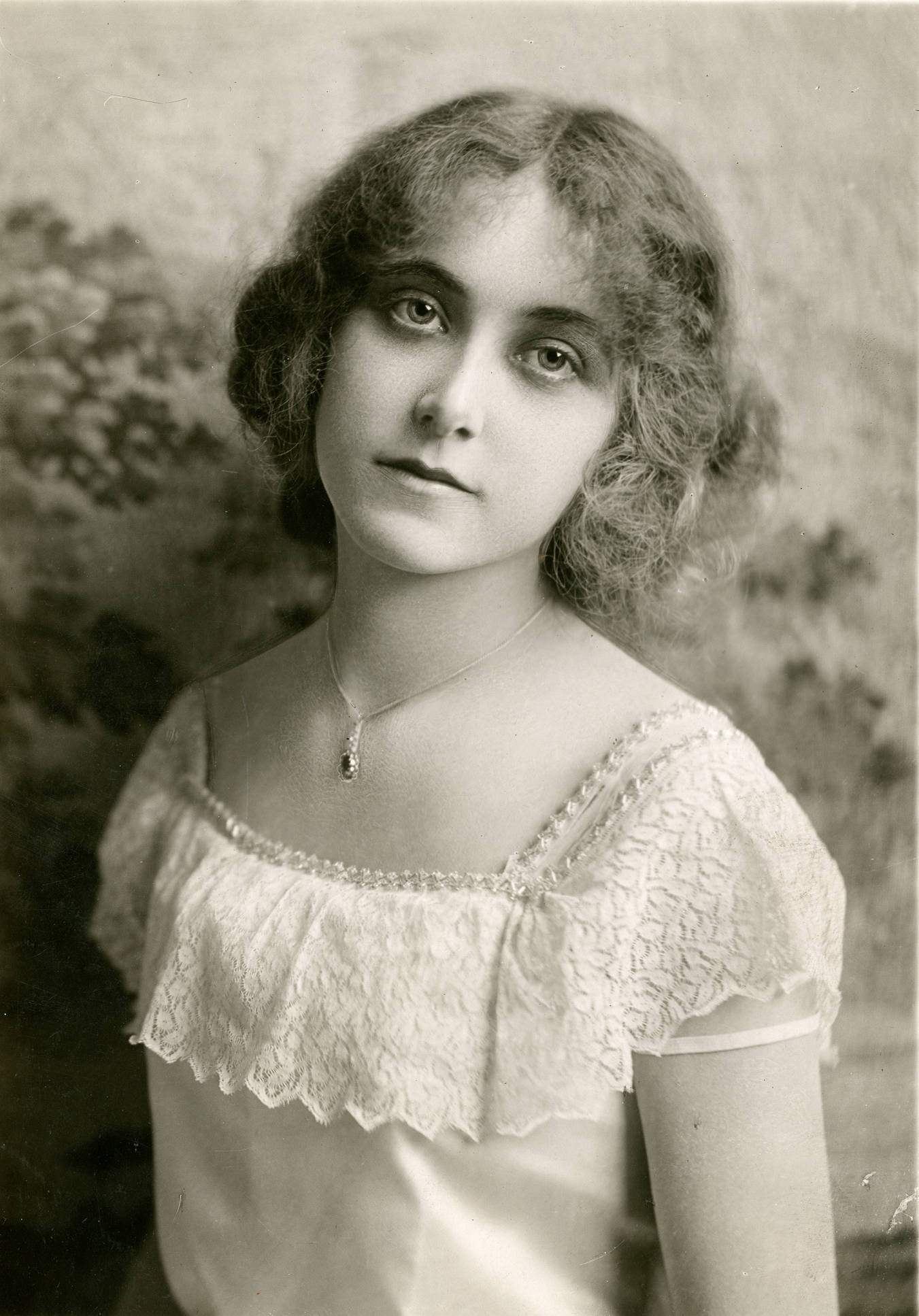
- Billington in 1914
- Born: Francelia Billington; February 1, 1895; Dallas, Texas, U.S.
- Died: November 24, 1934 (aged 39); Glendale, California, U.S.
- Resting place: Calvary Cemetery (Los Angeles)
- Occupation: Actress
- Years active: 1912–1930
- Spouse: Lester Cuneo (m.1920–div.1925)
- Children: 2

Francelia Billington (February 1, 1895 – November 24, 1934) was an early American silent-screen actress, and an accomplished camera operator.

== Early life ==
On February 1, 1895, Billington was born in Dallas, Texas, the daughter of James Billington and his wife, Adelaide Bueter. At age 10, she moved to Los Angeles, where she attended Sacred Heart Convent.

== Career ==
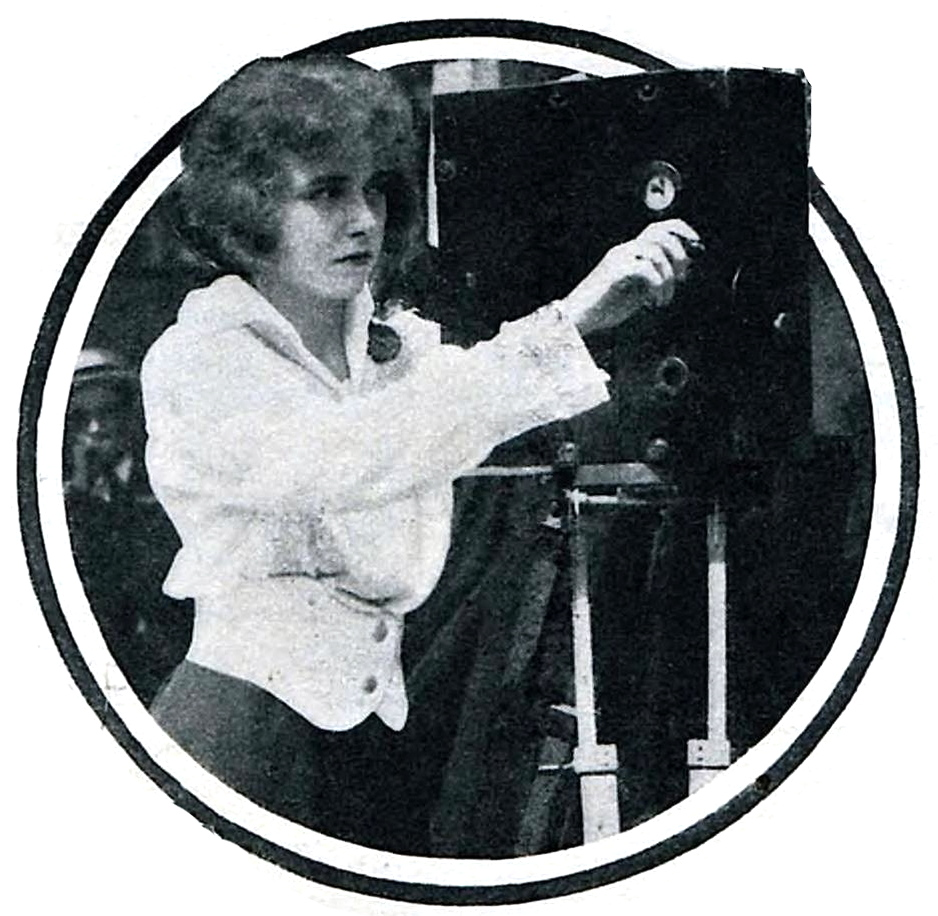
Francelia Billington operating a movie camera in 1914

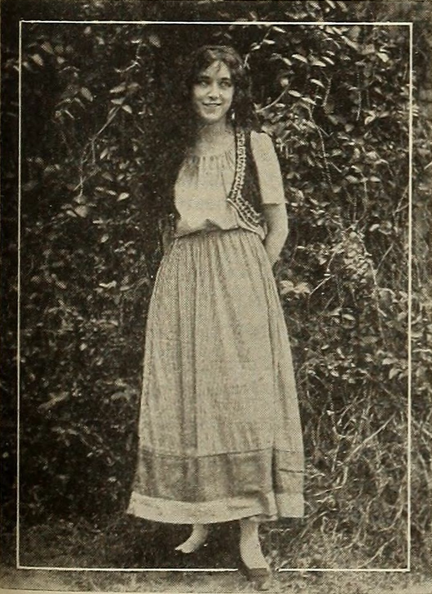
Francelia Billington as Anita in At the Stroke of the Angelus (1915)

She began working in films for the Kalem Company's West Coast studio in 1912, then moved to Reliance-Majestic Studios the following year, and she continued starring in films under its banner when D.W. Griffith became the studio's director-general. Billington made The Half Breed with Jack Pickford in 1913. The production was filmed at the Majestic Studio on Boyle Heights.

Billington left Majestic in 1915, and following her association with the Palo Alto Film Corporation, where she worked with Nell Shipman, one of the more remarkable figures in film history on the uncompleted film Wanda of the Red Street, she joined Universal. There, she played leads for directors Rupert Julian and Rex Ingram. In 1917, she went to The American Film Company in Santa Barbara, California to star in features directed by Edward Sloman. Her return to Universal in 1918 brought her a co-starring role in one of silent film's cinematic milestones: Blind Husbands, Erich von Stroheim's directorial debut. Billington played the wife, and Sam De Grasse played the husband. Although her performance brought praise from the critics, she earned no other great roles, and she continued in a mix of undistinguished melodramas, Westerns, and action films.

== Later years ==
Billington's level of film production slowed down with only five total films in 1918 and 1919. One of her 1920s features was a Western genre film with Tom Mix, titled Desert Love. Later that year, she returned to Rex Ingram's directorship with Hearts Are Trumps. Billington acted the role of Sybil Sayre in the first film made for the Ray Rockett Film Corporation, in 1920. She was cast with Betty Blythe in The Truant Husband (1921). The screenplay was based on a story by Albert Payson Terhune which had appeared in Cosmopolitan. Billington supported Madge Bellamy in The White Sin (1924).

== Marriage ==
In October 1920 Billington married Lester Cuneo at the Riverside Inn in Riverside, California. They resided at Cuneo's home in Beverly Hills, California and had two children together. The couple appeared in 14 films together, with their last two features in 1925. However, their marriage unraveled, and he killed himself on November 1, 1925, while their divorce proceedings were under way.

== Death ==
Billington's health was visibly declining at the beginning of 1934. She died from tuberculosis, there were no obituaries in the trade papers, and her death went unnoticed by the film industry and the public. She is interred at Calvary Cemetery in East Los Angeles, California.

== Partial filmography ==
- A Mix-Up in Pedigrees (1913)
- The Lover's Gift (1914)
- At the Stroke of the Angelus (1915, short)
- The Mainspring (1916)
- Naked Hearts (1916)
- The Right to Be Happy (1916)
- The Black Sheep of the Family (1916)
- Bettina Loved a Soldier (1916)
- Heart Strings (1917)
- My Fighting Gentleman (1917)
- The Sea Master (1917)
- The Wrong Man (1917)
- Blind Husbands (1919)
- The Day She Paid (1919)
- The Great Air Robbery (1919)
- Hearts Are Trumps (1920)
- The Terror (1920)
- The Truant Husband (1921)
- Blazing Arrows (1922)
- Restless Souls (1922)
- What a Wife Learned (1923)
- The White Sin (1924)
- Hearts of the West (1925)
- The Mounted Stranger (1930)
