= My Fighting Gentleman =

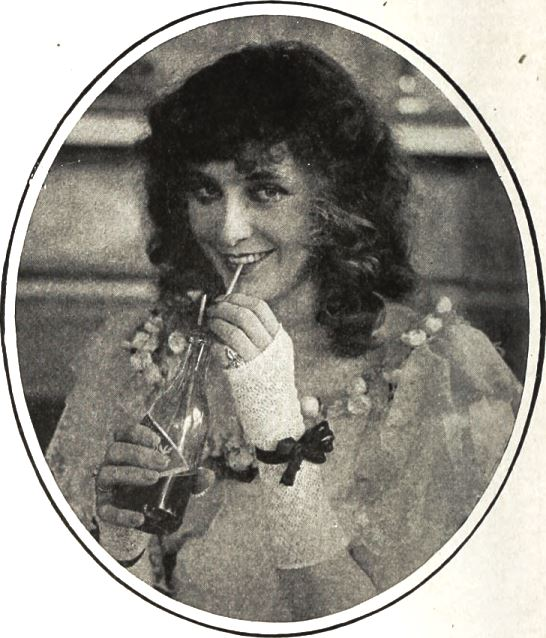
- Francelia Billington between scenes enjoying a drink
- Directed by: Edward Sloman
- Written by: Doris Schroeder; Nell Shipman
- Starring: William Russell; Francelia Billington
- Distributed by: Mutual Film
- Release date: March 12, 1917
- Running time: 5 reels
- Country: United States
- Language: Silent (English intertitles)

My Fighting Gentleman (also known as A Son of Battle) is a 1917 American silent historical drama film directed by Edward Sloman with the storyline by Doris Schroeder and Nell Shipman. The film stars William Russell and Francelia Billington.

== Cast ==
- William Russell as Frank Carlisle
- Francelia Billington as Virginia Leighton
- Charles Newton as Colonel Carlisle
- Jack Vosburgh as Huntly Thornton
- Clarence Burton as Isiah Gore
- Harry von Meter as Judge Pembroke
- William Carroll as Jubilee
- Sid Algier as Jim
- Lucille Ward as Undetermined Role

== See also ==
- List of films and television shows about the American Civil War
