= The Lover's Gift =

1914 silent short film

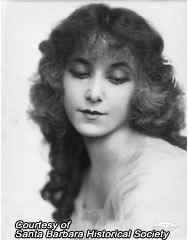
The film starred Francelia Billington

The Lover's Gift is a 1914 American silent short film. The film starred Earle Foxe, Mary Alden, Francelia Billington and George Siegmann. Although it received mixed reviews, Peter Milne, writing for Motion Picture News, lauded it for its "wonderful riding."

== Plot ==
This plot summary appeared in The Moving Picture World for May 30, 1914:

James Dayton, a wild youth in the West, Finally settles down and becomes engaged to Jess McKiin, daughter of a wealthy rancher. Sheriff lieed, who has long been a protector of Jess from childhood up, warns Dayton against bad companions, but Dayton is seen talking to Daphne Dore, a woman of the underworld. The news is brought to Jess, who throws down Dayton for his conduct. Daphne, jealous of Jess, gets in an argument with. Day ton. fires at him. but accidentally kills anotner mad. Dayton is accused and bides in Jess's home. The sheriff follows, and Dayton escapes to 'the desert, whither the sheriff follows after discovering from Daphne the truth of the affair, and brings him back to the girl. But Dayton has shot him, believing he is after him for the killuag, and the sheriff dies after safely returning Dayton to Jess's arms.
