= Restless Souls (1922 film) =

American drama film

- Directed by: Robert Ensminger
- Written by: Richard Harding Davis (story); Calder Johnstone; Fred Schaefer
- Produced by: Albert E. Smith
- Starring: Earle Williams; Francelia Billington; Arthur Hoyt
- Cinematography: George Robinson
- Production company: Vitagraph Company of America
- Distributed by: Vitagraph Company of America
- Release date: May 28, 1922
- Running time: 50 minutes
- Country: United States
- Languages: Silent; English intertitles

Restless Souls is a 1922 American silent drama film directed by Robert Ensminger and starring Earle Williams, Francelia Billington and Arthur Hoyt.

== Cast ==
- Earle Williams as James Parkington
- Francelia Billington as Lida Parkington
- Arthur Hoyt as Edgar Swetson
- Martha Mattox as Mrs. Fortescue
- Nick Cogley as Uncle Ben

== Bibliography ==
- Robert B. Connelly. The Silents: Silent Feature Films, 1910-36, Volume 40, Issue 2. December Press, 1998.
