= The Mainspring =

1916 silent drama film

- Directed by: Jack Conway
- Written by: Charles Agnew MacLean; William Parker
- Starring: Ben F. Wilson; Wilbur Higby; Francelia Billington
- Cinematography: Edward A. Kull
- Production company: Universal Pictures
- Distributed by: Universal Pictures
- Release date: November 27, 1916
- Running time: 5 reels
- Country: United States
- Languages: Silent; English intertitles

The Mainspring is a 1916 American silent drama film directed by Jack Conway and starring Ben F. Wilson, Wilbur Higby and Francelia Billington.

== Cast ==
- Ben F. Wilson as Lawrence Ashmore / Larry Craven
- Wilbur Higby as Jesse Craven
- Henry Holland as Richard Creelman
- Francelia Billington as Edith Craven
- Clyde Benson as William Ramsdale
- Raymond Whitaker as Shackleton
- Marc B. Robbins as Israel Farnum
- Thomas Jefferson as James Sharp
- Ed Brady as Jerviss
- Mary Maurice as Bernice

== Bibliography ==
- James Robert Parish & Michael R. Pitts. Film directors: a guide to their American films. Scarecrow Press, 1974.
