= B. H. DeLay =

American stunt pilot (1891–1923)

B. H. De Lay
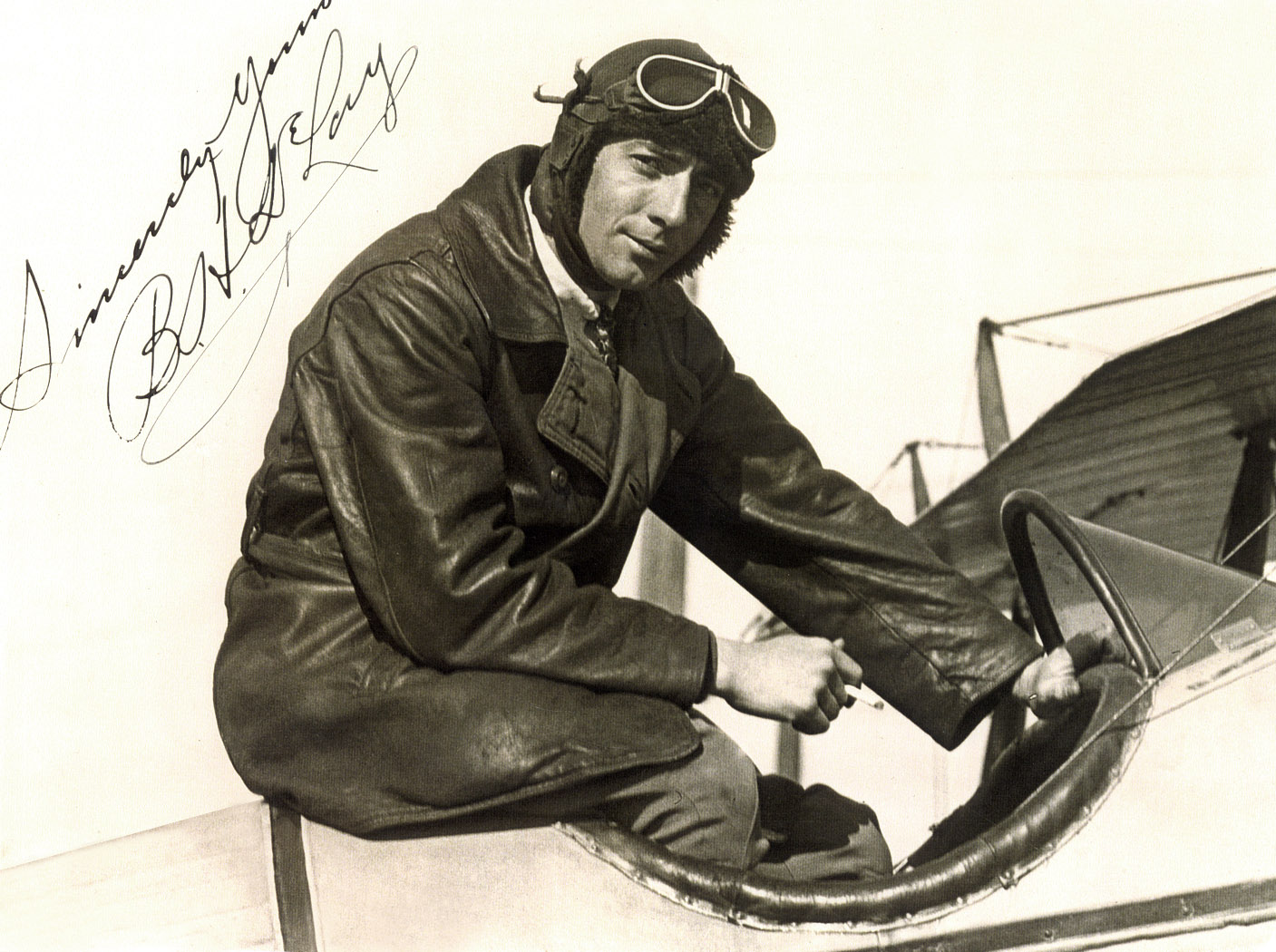
- Born: Beverly Homer De Lay; August 12, 1891; Alameda, California
- Died: July 4, 1923 (aged 31); Venice, Los Angeles
- Spouse: Juanita Carman Smythe Mason

Beverly Homer DeLay (August 12, 1891 – July 4, 1923) was an American aviator who pioneered many of the popular stunts used in the early barnstorming air-shows. He soon adapted them for the movies, where he appeared with top Hollywood stars. DeLay died in a plane crash that was almost certainly caused by sabotage, but no one was ever charged in connection with the death.

== Biography ==
DeLay was born in the San Francisco Bay Area, Alameda, California on August 12, 1891. He was educated at the Engineering School of the University of California (UCB - University of California Berkeley) and at the University of Heidelberg in Germany. He spoke French fluently, since his parents spoke French. DeLay's mother's side of the family originated from Alsace Lorraine, France.

DeLay first worked as a gold mine manager, since his father Charles Young DeLay was a gold mine operator. DeLay became a racecar driver, then later an airport manager and owner, which evolved into performing for motion pictures. DeLay's early daredevil style was theatrically demonstrated in his high-speed race moves in the domed dance pavilion on Pickering Pleasure Pier in Ocean Park, California. His theatrical family entertainment history reaches back over a hundred years to France, including stage actors, dancers, musicians, and theatre impresarios.

DeLay's grandmother Babette Wedell was born in France. Babette was a Premiere Danseuse (Lead Dancer) on stages, such as Maguire's theatre in San Francisco. His aunt Emma Schutz was a stage actor. DeLay's uncle Eugene Schutz was a San Francisco theatre impresario. The great 1906 San Francisco quake damaged and destroyed theatres that they performed at. DeLay's uncle Louis Harrison continued stage directing, writing plays, songs and acting as a comedian on Broadway.

B.H. DeLay married Juanita Carman Smythe in 1914, in the San Francisco Bay Area. Juanita was part of a literary family, including Bliss Carman, Charles G. D. Roberts and Ralph Waldo Emerson. Her middle name of Carman, named her after her first cousin, medal award-winning writer Bliss Carman. B. H. and Juanita had two daughters, Patricia and Beverley DeLay. Their daughter Beverley performed on stage in the Meglin Kiddies dance troupe with Shirley Temple.

DeLay acted in aviator roles and performed aerials in both comedies and dramatic films in the classic motion picture period (see the movie section below). He died in an airplane crash on July 4, 1923, while performing in an air show for an audience. Newspapers reported that he was sabotaged while performing between Venice and Santa Monica (Ocean Park), California.

== Aircraft ==
DeLay tirelessly promoted aviation, while pushing the limits in the entertainment industry, especially through innovative performances. He implemented the first lighted airport in the United States on DeLay Airfield. He also initiated the first aerial police in the nation in Venice, Los Angeles. DeLay was inspired to this action after a marine rescue attempt was thwarted. He proposed that his aerial forces, equipped with flotation devices, be ready for rescue at a moment's notice. This force was approved through the Board of Directors of the Venice Chamber of Commerce. When DeLay took charge of Ince Airfield (Venice Airfield) he was on a mission so that “the passenger service will be advanced to a degree of perfection and safety never before attained.”

DeLay was a constant aviation promoter through staging exhibitions (including barnstorming) and through performing aviation firsts for the movies. Some of his airshow expertise included the nose dive, ghost dive, Immelmann turn, barrel rolls, tail spins, multiple loop-the-loops, mock battles, racing, and flying fireworks. DeLay pioneered several aviation firsts for the motion pictures.

During his ten years of flying experience, DeLay conducted aerial rides with politicians, actors, and unusual personalities, such as an opera diva (Luisa Tetrazzini) and native celebrity singer (Tsianina Redfeather). He threw out the game opener baseball from his plane to DeLay Field as he flew over. The semi-pro baseball team he named for Venice, was called the Highflyers. He dropped event tickets, flew city engineers to produce aerial maps of Venice, and showered other promotional or ceremonial objects for events, such as masses of flowers over the ocean as tributes to war heroes. DeLay and several of his planes were also in movie aviator Ormer Locklear’s aerial funeral procession. In a promotion of Venice as a leading entertainment destination, DeLay flew a night loop-the-loop “fire ride” with fireworks on the back of his plane, while 20 United States Navy destroyers flashed their searchlights upon the horizon for his performance. DeLay was driven to advance aviation with continuous feats, such as proving that loop-the-loops could be performed at night.

The current developed site of DeLay Airfield is bordered by Venice Blvd., Abbot Kinney Blvd. and Washington Way.

== Aviation firsts for the motion pictures ==
B.H. DeLay performed at least half a dozen stunt firsts for the movies, including the first change from plane to train and train to plane. Another DeLay first was from saddle to plane, as well as auto to plane. "Daredevil" DeLay was the first to knock down a building with a plane on screen as well.

In one of DeLay's contracts he was engaged to rescue the heroine from the top of a burning building and at the same time he was to crash into the burning tower where the villain was hanging on to a flag pole, knocking over the tower and dashing the villain to his death. This scene was successfully performed with the aid of a setting constructed at the Venice Field.^{7}

== Motion picture performing ==
DeLay Field (Venice Field) was previously owned by director and producer Thomas Harper Ince. B.H. DeLay managed Thomas Ince's field before owning it. DeLay was in numerous motion pictures, including westerns, comedies and dramas. He acted and performed aerials with Ruth Roland, Oliver Hardy, Larry Semon, Milton Sills, Agnes Ayres, Florence Vidor, Al St. John, Helen Holmes, Viola Dana, Warner Oland, Thomas Ince, Ormer Locklear, Al Wilson, Frank Clarke, and many other notables. DeLay’s character was also well respected by the Warner Bros. Jack Warner wrote that DeLay was a "real flyer..."

B.H. DeLay conducted a movie stunt pilot training school at his airfield in Venice. DeLay worked with over 25 motion picture companies including the original Warner Bros., Pathé, Vitagraph, Astra, Universal, and Fox. (B.H. DeLay Aircraft Company advertising cites several of the following movies (below) to encourage the glamorous role of stunt aviation for the movies.)

== Unsolved mystery ==
B.H. DeLay was 31 when he died (along with passenger aviator, R.I. Short, President of the Essandee Corporation) in the crash of a sabotaged plane while performing in front of crowds of thousands at Ocean Park on July 4, 1923. He was in the middle of a loop-the-loop in his plane, the "Wasp", when the wings folded back; barreling them nose first into the earth. The plane burst into flames shortly after they were pulled from the wreckage. Pins in his wings were found to be a substandard size of only 3/8 of an inch, rather than 1/2 or 3/4, indicating wing tampering. Several headlines from Venice and other Los Angeles newspapers state that DeLay was murdered through sabotage while performing on July 4 in 1923. It remains an unsolved murder mystery.

He was also shot at in Clover Field (now Santa Monica Airport) days before his crash. A couple of other incidents occurred before the crash as well. In 1921, DeLay and seven others (including his lawyer, Francis J. Heney), were brought into court. C. E. Frey, who insisted that he bought DeLay Airfield—yet he had no proof—had a couple of his thugs plant posts in DeLay's airport so that planes could not take off. After DeLay had his crew remove the posts, C. E. Frey's gang dug trenches so that the planes could not take off. C. E. Frey ended up in jail with B.H. DeLay, C. Y. DeLay (B.H.'s father), G. F. Stephenson, Howard Patterson, along with others such as stunt performers, Frank Clarke and pilots Wallace Timm and Glen Boyd. DeLay had purchased the airport from the Crawford Airplane Company in September 1919.

Not only was B. H. DeLay an innovator, he was a humanitarian who frequently organized and performed in aviation or actor benefits for individuals and organizations in need.

== Movies with DeLay ==
DeLay was involved (acting, aviation & stunt directing/coordinating) with over 50 movies including:

- Skin Deep (A.K.A. Lucky Damage) 1922 (Thomas Ince) - Aviator (Actor) B. H. DeLay - Aerials also by B. H. DeLay
- Border Scouts 1922 (Directed by Bert Hall -who was represented in the 2006 movie Flyboys since he was one of the original seven of the Lafayette Escadrille)
- A Dangerous Adventure 1922 (Warner Bros.) Starring Grace Darmond & including Jumbo the Elephant
- The Bell Hop 1921 (Oliver Hardy & Larry Semon movie –including aviation footage, which is impressive by today's standards. Still available to the public.) - Aerials by B. H. DeLay
- Fighting Fate 1921 (William Duncan)
- Skirts 1921 (Fox) - Aerials by B. H. DeLay
- The Baby 1921 (Fox Sunshine) - Aerials by B. H. DeLay
- The Vengeance Trail 1921 (Will Rogers Jr.) - Aviator (Actor) B. H. DeLay - Aerials by B. H. DeLay
- A Western Tenderfoot 1921 (Fox/Louis Gasnier)
- Ruth of the Rockies 1920 (Ruth Roland) (A.K.A. Broadway Bab) - Aviator (Actor) B. H. DeLay - Aerials also by B. H. DeLay
- Tiger Band 1920 (Helen Holmes)
- Go Get It 1920 (Marshall Neilan)
- Aero Nut 1920 (A.K.A. Aerial Nut) (Fox/Al St. John) - Aerials by B. H. DeLay
- He Married His Wife 1919 (Al Christie)
- Also dozens of Fox Film Corporation Sunshine Comedies

"[In 1922] DeLay dominated stunts in the motion picture industry." (Wynne 1987:28)

== Crew ==
- DeLay performed live at actor benefits with Douglas Fairbanks, Tom Mix, Harry Carey, Will Rogers, William S. Hart, Buck Jones, Hoot Gibson and other notables.
- B. H. DeLay's daughter, Beverley De Lay, was a Meglin Kiddie dancer like Shirley Temple and was in the Land of Oz 1932 movie. His daughter, Beverley, also attended Hollywood High School at the same time as Judy Garland. Beverley also performed live at the still glorious Pantages Theatre (Hollywood).
- DeLay attended the famous Fly-in (only) Party of the Brand Estate, where he was nearly involved in a head-on collision with Anita Snook (Teacher of Amelia Earhart.) He was aerial performing for the crowd, but Snook had to leave early and ended up in his flying path. At the last moment, DeLay dove under Snook's plane. His propellers were shaved off in the trees, but both of their lives were saved. (Underwood 1984:21)
- B. H. DeLay had various aircraft specially designed for him and he owned a set of Curtiss JN-4 (JN-4D specifically) at his airport.
- Aviators who worked with or for DeLay's Venice Airfield included: Al Wilson , Frank Clarke, Ormer Locklear, Dick Grace, Otto Timm, Art Goebel (winner of Dole Air Race), "Fronty" Nichols, Frank Tomick, Ivan Unger, Al Johnson, Wallace Timm, Howard Patterson, Glen Boyd, Mark Campbell, Otto "Swede" Myerhoffer, Bob Lloyd, E. L. Remelin, Waldo Waterman, Fred Hoyt, Gil Budwig, Sam Greenwald, and many more.

== See also ==
- List of unsolved murders (1900–1979)
