= Hearts of the West (disambiguation) =

Hearts of the West may refer to:

- Hearts of the West (1925 film)
- Hearts of the West (1975 film)
- Hearts of the West, a 1995 romantic novel by Elizabeth Lambert
