= A Mix-Up in Pedigrees =

1913 film

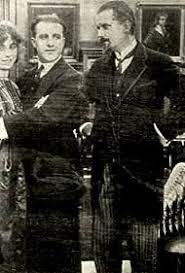
- Starring: William Garwood; Francelia Billington
- Distributed by: Mutual Film
- Release date: October 5, 1913
- Country: United States
- Languages: Silent film English intertitles

A Mix-Up in Pedigrees is a 1913 American silent short comedy film starring William Garwood and Francelia Billington. Prints and/or fragments were found in the Dawson Film Find in 1978.

== Cast ==
- William Garwood
- Francelia Billington
- Annie Drew
