= Ormer Locklear =

American aviator (1891–1920)

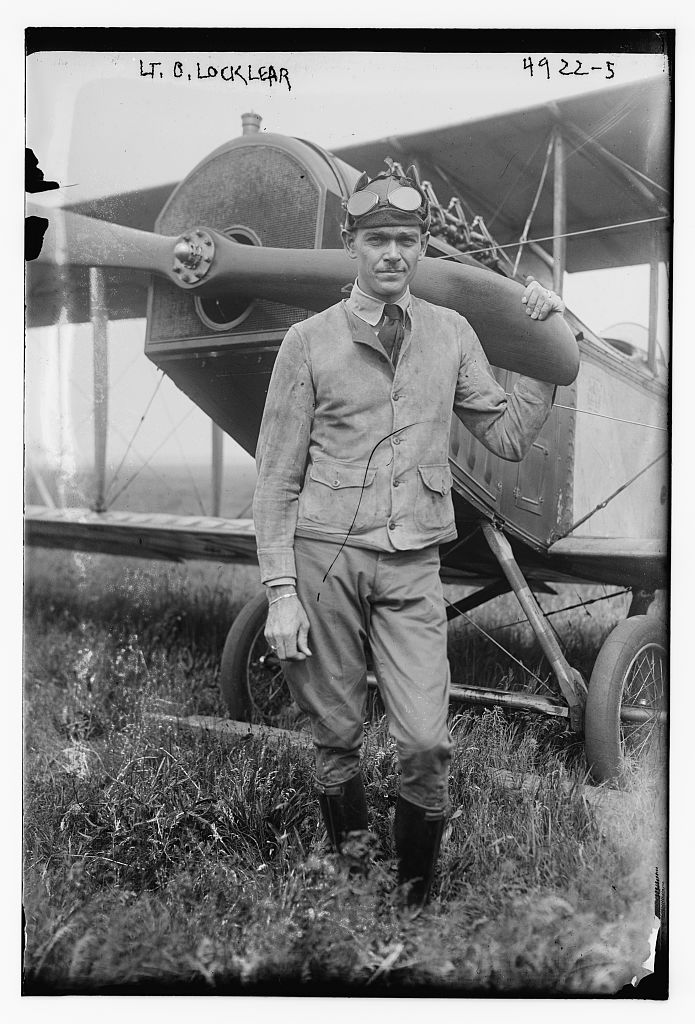
- Locklear in 1919
- Born: Ormer Leslie Locklear; October 28, 1891; Greenville, Texas, U.S.
- Died: August 2, 1920 (aged 28); Los Angeles, California, U.S.
- Cause of death: Airplane crash
- Resting place: Greenwood Cemetery
- Spouse: Ruby Graves (m. 1915)

Ormer Leslie "Lock" Locklear (October 28, 1891 – August 2, 1920) was an American daredevil stunt pilot and film actor.

His popular flying circus caught the attention of Hollywood, and he starred in The Great Air Robbery (1919), a screenplay about the mid-air piracy of a US airmail plane. In his next film, The Skywayman, the plane crashed during a climactic dive, when the lighting team supposedly failed to douse the lights on cue, so Locklear was dazzled and flew blindly into the ground, dying instantly with his co-pilot Milton "Skeets" Elliott. The scene remained on the film.

== Early life ==
Born in Greenville, Texas, Locklear was raised in Fort Worth. In 1911, Locklear met Calbraith Perry Rodgers, who landed his plane in Fort Worth to unclog a fuel line. After meeting Rodgers, Locklear became fascinated with aviation and airplanes. Shortly thereafter, Locklear and his brother constructed their own glider.

Upon completing his education, Locklear went to work as a carpenter.

== Flying career ==
In October 1917, Locklear joined the U.S. Army Air Service. He trained in Austin, at Camp Dick and Barron Field, becoming a flying instructor. Locklear was an exponent of wing walking to make aircraft repairs in flight.

A second lieutenant at the end of the World War I, Locklear had been assigned to military recruitment when he saw a barnstorming show and realized his own usual flying exploits were far more impressive. After briefly reenlisting, Locklear left the Army in 1919, along with two military colleagues, Milton "Skeets" Elliott and Shirley Short. With manager and promoter William Pickens, they soon obtained aircraft and formed the "Locklear Flying Circus".

Pickens had a great deal of experience promoting barnstormers, with Locklear being his greatest success. Both men became wealthy and lived in high style. His trademark stunt of jumping from one aircraft to another led Locklear to perfect a transfer from a car, and then the "Dance of Death," in which two pilots, in two aircraft, would switch places in midair.

On April 7, 1920, Locklear was flying in the city of Los Angeles, California, where he was issued the first aviation law violation for reckless aerial driving. He was fined $25.00 ($460 in 2025).

== Film career ==
Locklear performing one of his famous stunts.

The Locklear Flying Circus performed throughout the United States. When they came to the attention of Hollywood, Pickens arranged for Locklear to appear as a stunt man in film work. This opened the way to a movie career in California for Locklear, now considered the foremost "aviation stunt man in the world". Carl Laemmle, head of Universal Pictures, agreed to purchase all of Locklear's future air show dates in July 1919 in order to have him on contract for a proposed two-film series. Locklear was signed to star in The Great Air Robbery, a film depicting pilots flying air mail.

Principal photography for The Great Air Robbery began in July 1919 at DeMille Field 1, Los Angeles, California, owned by producer Cecil B. DeMille. Besides being used as a base for flying, Locklear's Curtiss JN-4 "Jenny" aircraft was also mounted on a raised wooden platform at the airfield in order to film closeups. The Great Air Robbery was primarily an opportunity to showcase the aerial stunts that had made Locklear famous. The studio promotion was extensive, with Laemmle declaring the film was "... the most amazing and unbelievable photodrama of all time." The promotional campaign included a premiere at the Superba Theatre in Los Angeles, and a two-month personal appearance tour with Locklear.

Reviews were generally favourable, as The Great Air Robbery was the first of a cycle of postwar films dealing with the exploits of stunt pilots. The New York Times review focused on the exciting elements of the film. "Lieutenant Locklear swings from one airplane to another and crawls out on the tail of a flying machine several thousand feet, presumably, above the earth. The melodrama's use of airplanes for midnight mail deliveries, highway, or rather highair, robberies, and battles between the forces of law and lawlessness adds excitement."

Although The Great Air Robbery was a commercial success, Laemmle did not take up the option for a second film starring Locklear, prompting his $25,000 lawsuit against Universal. Unwilling to go back to the air show circuit, Locklear wanted to continue his Hollywood career, and in April 1920, he was signed to star in The Skywayman (1920).

Principal photography on The Skywayman began on June 11, 1920, with DeMille Field 2 as the main base of operations. (Note: Producer Cecil B. DeMille owned two airfields engaged in commercial aviation, in Los Angeles, California.) Despite Locklear's public claim that new stunts "more daring ever filmed" would be involved, the production would rely heavily on models and less on actual stunt flying. Two stunts, a church steeple being toppled by Locklear's aircraft and an aircraft-to-train transfer, were both problematic and nearly ended in disaster.

== Personal life ==
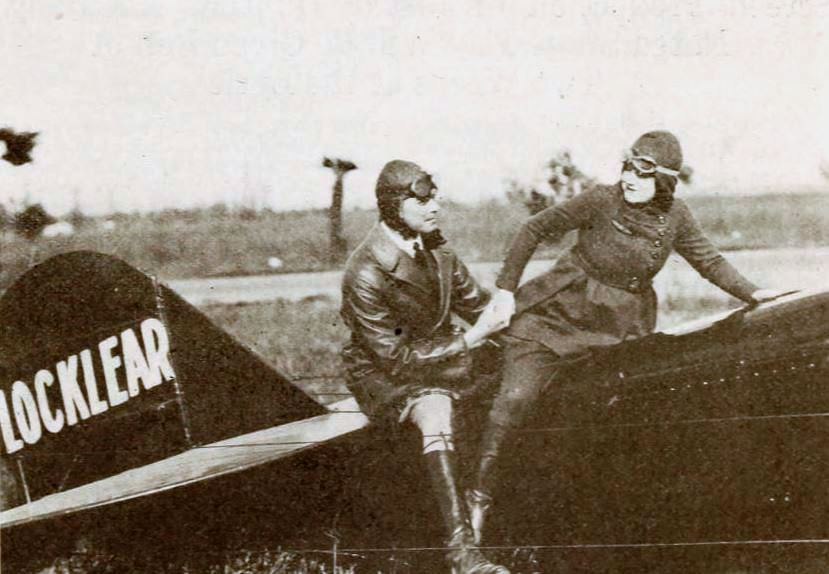
Ormer Locklear and Viola Dana

Locklear married Ruby Graves in 1915. The marriage was largely unhappy as Graves and Locklear had vastly different personalities. They separated in 1919 after Locklear moved to Los Angeles to pursue a film career. Despite the marriage being an unhappy one, Graves refused to grant Locklear a divorce. They remained legally married until Locklear's death.

While separated from Graves, Locklear met the widowed silent film actress Viola Dana. They began a relationship and were engaged at the time of Locklear's death. Dana witnessed the plane crash that killed Locklear. She was so traumatized by the event that she refused to fly for the next 25 years. In 1980, Dana recalled her relationship with Locklear and also spoke about his fatal crash in the documentary Hollywood.

== Death ==
The last stunt scheduled for filming for The Skywayman was a nighttime spin, initially to take place in daylight with cameras fitted with red filters to simulate darkness. Locklear, under a lot of pressure, with not only his family life being in upheaval but also learning that studio head William Fox was not going to extend his contract beyond one film, demanded that he be allowed to fly at night. The studio relented, and on August 2, 1920, publicity surrounding the stunt led to a large crowd gathering to witness the filming of the unusual stunt. Large studio arc lights were set up on DeMille Field 2 to illuminate the Curtiss "Jenny", to be doused as the aircraft entered its final spin. The dive towards some oil derricks was to make it appear that the airplane crashed beside the oil well. As arranged, Locklear had forewarned the lighting crew to douse their lights when he got near the derricks so that he could see to pull out of the dive, saying that "When you take the lights off, I'll know where I am and I can come out of it." After completing a series of aerial maneuvers, Locklear signaled that he would descend.

In front of spectators and film crew, Locklear and his long-time flying partner "Skeets" Elliot crashed heavily into the sludge pool of an oil well, never pulling out of the incipient spin. The crash resulted in a massive explosion and fire, with Locklear and Elliot dying instantly. After the accident, speculation revolved around the five arc lights that had remained fully on, possibly blinding the flight crew.

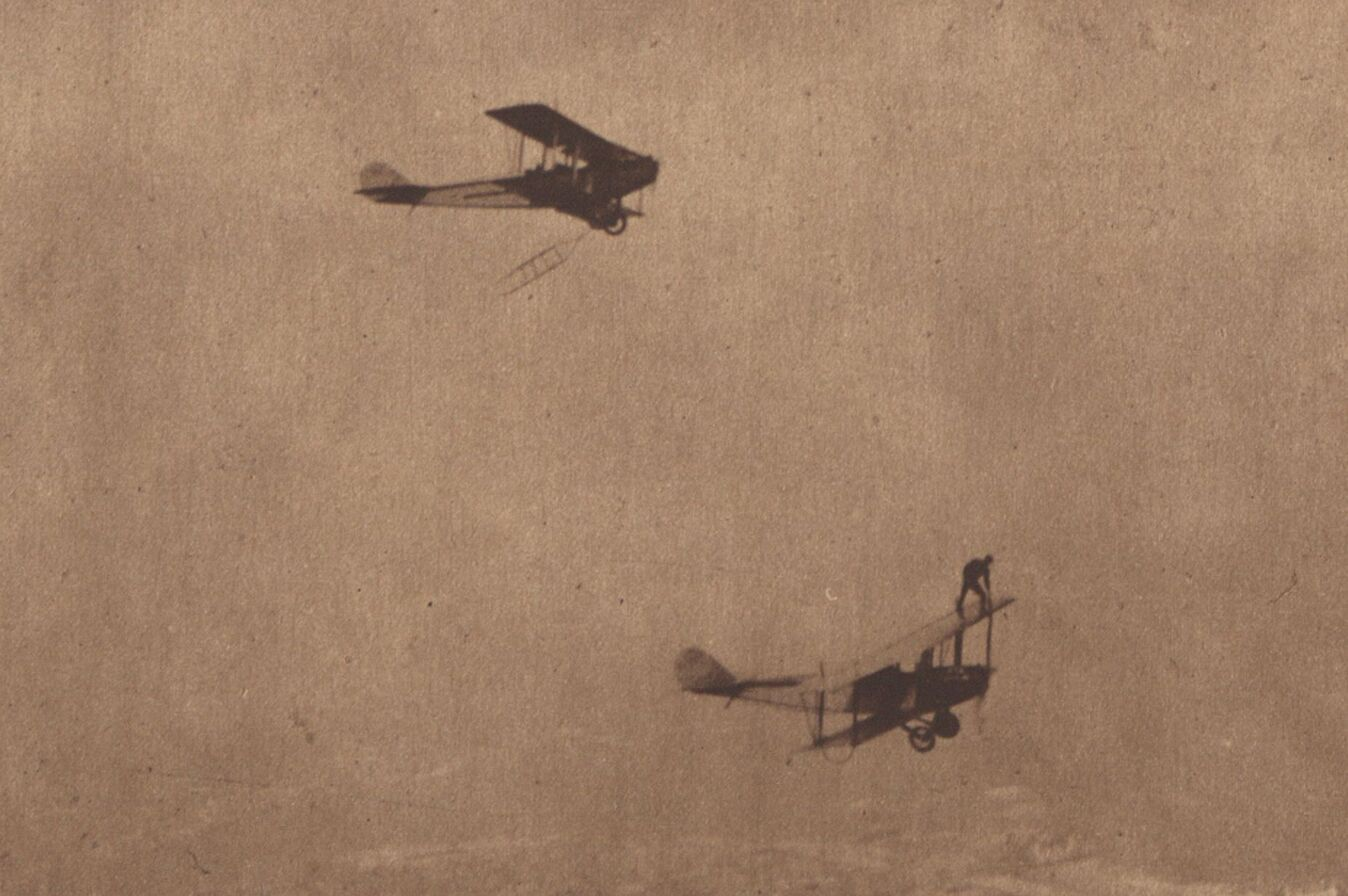
In Atlantic City, Ormer Locklear of Locklear's Flying Circus clings to one plane waiting for a second plane trailing a rope ladder

With the entire film already completed except for the night scene, Fox made the decision to capitalize on the fatal crash by rushing The Skywayman into post-production and release. With notices proclaiming "Every Inch Of Film Showing Locklear's Spectacular (And Fatal) Last Flight. His Death-Defying Feats And A Close Up Of His Spectacular Crash To Earth," the film premiered in Los Angeles on September 5, 1920. The advertising campaign that accompanied the film was very similar to that of Locklear's first feature film, focusing on his earlier exploits and combining model displays and exhibition flights across North America to coincide with the film's release. Upon the film's release, Fox Film Corporation publicly announced that 10% of the profits would go to the families of Locklear and Elliot.

Locklear is buried at Greenwood Cemetery in Fort Worth, Texas.

== Filmography ==
Year	Title	Role	Notes
1919	The Great Air Robbery	Larry Cassidy (as Lieut. Ormer Locklear)	Lost film
1920	The Skywayman	Capt. Norman and a stunt man	Lost film, posthumously released
1920	Screen Snapshots, Series 1, No. 7	Self (as Lt. Locklear)	Short film, posthumously released

== Legacy ==
Locklear was reputed to be the prototype for the character of Waldo Pepper, played by Robert Redford in The Great Waldo Pepper (1975). Viola Dana was an honored guest at the premiere of the film.
