= The Great Air Robbery =

1919 film by Jacques Jaccard

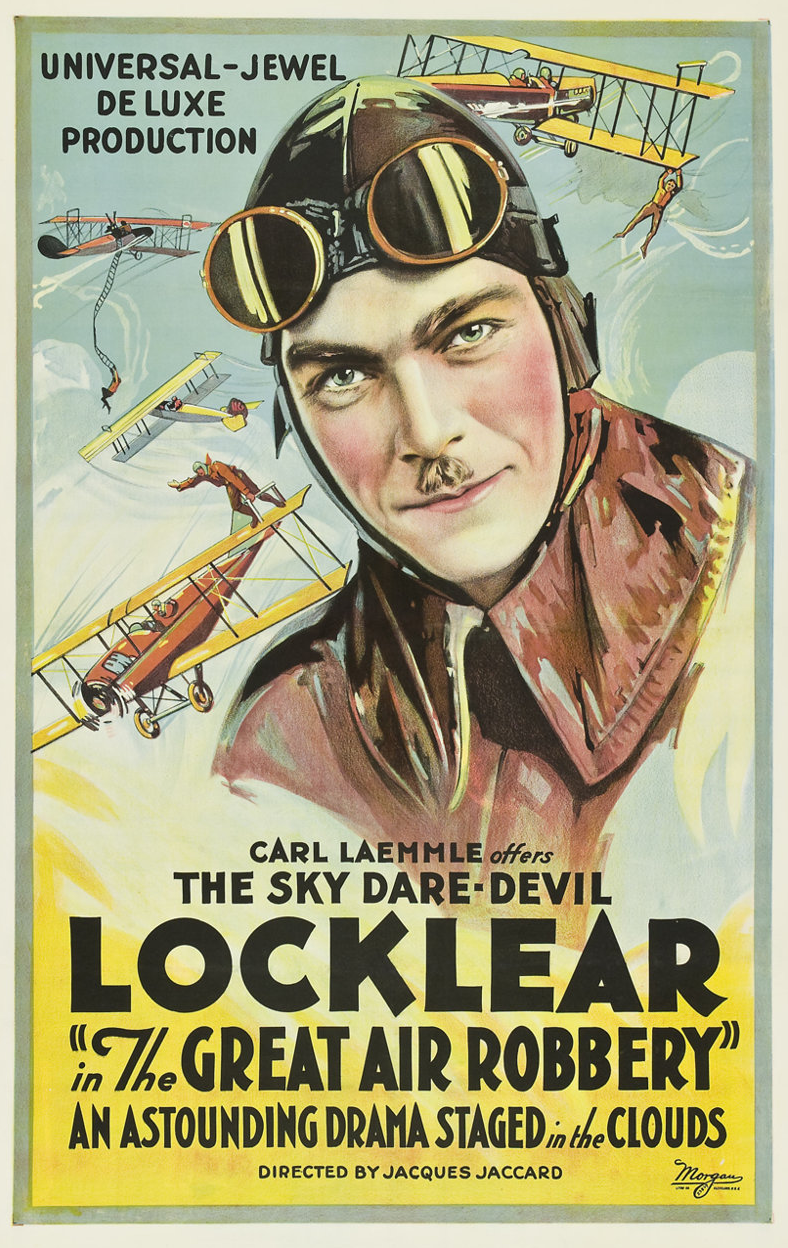
- Theatrical poster
- Directed by: Jacques Jaccard
- Written by: Jacques Jaccard (screenplay); George Hively
- Based on: story by George Hively
- Starring: Ormer Locklear; Allan Forrest; Ray Ripley
- Cinematography: Milton Moore; Elmer Dyer
- Edited by: Frank Lawrence; Lloyd Nosler
- Music by: Albert Glasser
- Production company: Universal Film Manufacturing Company
- Distributed by: Universal Film Manufacturing Company; Jewel Productions, Inc.
- Release date: December 28, 1919
- Running time: 88 minutes (approximately)
- Country: United States
- Language: Silent (English intertitles)
- Budget: $250,000

The Great Air Robbery (aka Cassidy of the Air Lanes) is a six-reel silent 1919 American drama film directed by Jacques Jaccard and produced by Universal Pictures. The film stars Ormer Locklear, Allan Forrest and Ray Ripley. The Great Air Robbery is a film that showcases the talents of stunt pilot Locklear, considered the foremost "aviation stunt man in the world", and depicts pilots flying air mail, the first film to deal with the subject. There are no known archival holdings of the film, so it is presumably a lost film.

== Plot ==
In 1925, pilot Larry Cassidy (Ormer Locklear) is flying air mail for the United States Postal Service. He faces a deadly foe, Chester Van Arland (Ray Ripley), the leader of the "Death's Head Squadron", intent on stealing a $20,000 shipment of gold that will be on a midnight flight to Washington. Van Arland has the medal air mail pilot Wallie Mason (Allan Forrest) was awarded for his war service in France and has kidnapped Mason's girlfriend, Beryl Caruthers (Francelia Billington). He offers to return the medal in return for inside information about the gold shipment. Cassidy, Mason's friend and fellow pilot, is able to stymie the gang's plans, using his aircraft to chase down Van Arland and rescue Mason's girlfriend.

== Cast ==
- Ormer Locklear as Larry Cassidy (credited as Lieut. Ormer Locklear)
- Allan Forrest as Wallie Mason
- Ray Ripley as Chester Van Arland
- Francelia Billington as Beryl Caruthers
- Carmen Phillips as Viola Matthews (Note: Tom London, credited as Leonard Clapham, appears in an uncredited role.)

== Production ==
Ormer Locklear performing one of his famous stunts.

Carl Laemmle, the head of Universal Studios, noted the success of The Grim Game (1919), starring Harry Houdini, that featured a spectacular aerial sequence of an actual midair collision. Hiring the foremost stunt pilot of the time, Laemmle planned a series of aviation features that would highlight the aerial stunts performed by Ormer Locklear, who would also be the star of the films.

Principal photography for The Great Air Robbery began in July 1919 at DeMille Field 1, Los Angeles, California, owned by producer Cecil B. DeMille. Besides being used as a base for flying, Locklear's Curtiss JN-4 "Jenny" aircraft was also mounted on a raised wooden platform at the airfield in order to film closeups. (Note: To simulate flight, stage hands moved the wings up and down.) The film was the first to be set at one of the DeMille airfields, with Universal leasing both the facilities and Curtiss JN4 training aircraft. The DeMille aircraft portraying air mail aircraft were prominently displayed with the "CB" logo on their fuselages and rudders, while the "Death's Head Squadron" had skull and crossbones markings.

Elmer Dyer, who assisted cinematographer Milton Moore, got his start on The Great Air Robbery. He would later go on to work on many films as an aerial cinematographer of great renown. Studio and location work was completed on August 2, 1919.

== Reception ==
The Great Air Robbery was primarily an opportunity to showcase the aerial stunts that had made Locklear famous. The studio promotion was extensive, with Laemmle declaring the film was "... the most amazing and unbelievable photodrama of all time." The promotional campaign included a premiere at the Superba Theatre in Los Angeles and a two-month personal appearance tour by Locklear. Curtiss Aircraft loaned aircraft, engines and miniatures, and numerous model aircraft contests were staged as part of the advertising campaign. During a promotion for The Great Air Robbery, an Essex Motors touring car, built to replicate a 600-pound bomber, was driven through the streets of Omaha, Nebraska to the Moon Theater entranceway.

Reviews were generally favourable, as The Great Air Robbery was the first of a cycle of postwar films dealing with the exploits of stunt pilots. The New York Times review focused on the exciting elements of the film. "Lieutenant Locklear swings from one airplane to another and crawls out on the tail of a flying machine several thousand feet, presumably, above the earth. The melodrama's use of airplanes for midnight mail deliveries, highway, or rather highair, robberies, and battles between the forces of law and lawlessness adds excitement."

Although The Great Air Robbery was a commercial success, Laemmle did not take up the option for a second film starring Locklear, prompting his $25,000 lawsuit against Universal. Unwilling to go back to the air show circuit, Locklear wanted to continue his Hollywood career, and in April 1920, he was signed to star in The Skywayman (1920). Locklear was killed during the production when he and fellow pilot Milton Elliot crashed during a night scene. He made a steep dive over an oil field but floodlights dazzled him and he crashed. Later, the scene was edited showing a clip of them walking away from the crash, taken earlier.
