= Hearts of the West (1925 film) =

1925 film

- Directed by: Ward Lascelle (per allmovie's Hans J. Wollstein)
- Written by: Arthur Henry Gooden
- Produced by: Ward Lascelle Productions; Lester Cuneo Productions; Ben F. Wilson
- Starring: Lester Cuneo; Francelia Billington
- Distributed by: Arrow Film Corporation
- Release date: January 20, 1925
- Running time: 5 reels
- Country: United States
- Languages: Silent; English intertitles

Hearts of the West is a 1925 American silent Western film directed and co-produced by Ward Lascelle, written by Arthur Henry Gooden and starring Lester Cuneo and real life wife Francelia Billington. Cuneo also coproduced with Lascelle.

It is possibly a lost film. A printed American Film Institute catalogue shows it held in the Library of Congress collection but the LOC online database shows no holdings.

== Plot summary ==
A ranch foreman is fired because he whipped a horse. He then decides to join a gang of rustlers. His sister rescues him from a potential life of crime. The sister and ranch owner fall for each other.

== Cast ==
- Lester Cuneo
- Francelia Billington
- Annabelle Lee
- Charles King
- Slim Padgett
