= The Skywayman =

1920 film by James P. Hogan

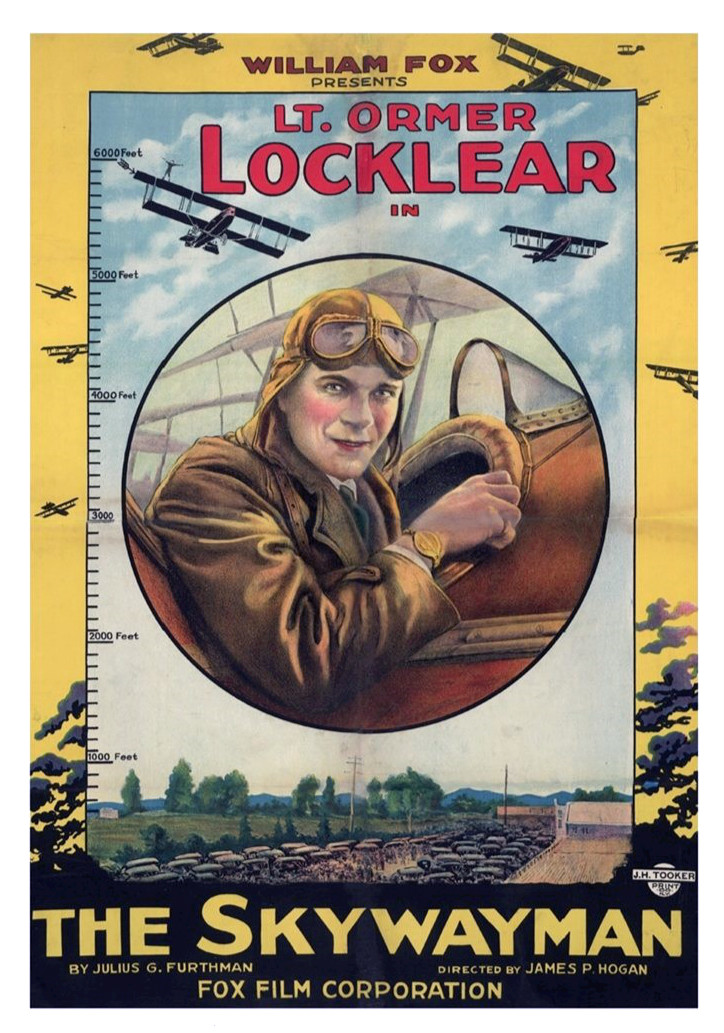
- Theatrical release poster
- Directed by: James P. Hogan
- Screenplay by: Jules Furthman
- Story by: Jules Furthman
- Produced by: Sol M. Wurtzel
- Starring: Ormer Locklear; Louise Lovely
- Production company: William Fox Studio
- Distributed by: Fox Film Corporation
- Release date: September 5, 1920
- Running time: 50 minutes (approximately)
- Country: United States
- Language: Silent (English intertitles)

The Skywayman is a 1920 American silent action drama film directed by James P. Hogan and produced and distributed by Fox Film Corporation. The film starred noted aerial stunt pilot Ormer Locklear and Louise Lovely. After having appeared in The Great Air Robbery (1919), a film that showcased his aerial talents, Locklear, considered the foremost "aviation stunt man in the world", was reluctant to return to the air show circuit. During the production, Locklear and his co-pilot Milton "Skeets" Elliot died after crashing during a night scene. The Skywayman was subsequently released shortly after, capitalizing on their deaths.

No footage of The Skywayman is known to exist, and the film is now considered lost.

== Plot ==
Captain Norman Craig returns from the Lafayette Escadrille as a shell-shocked veteran, suffering from amnesia. Seeing him wandering around San Francisco, his girlfriend Virginia Ames, with the help of Dr. Wayne Leveridge, devises a plan to help him restore his memory. Her family hires Craig to pursue a pair of supposed Russian thieves after the Ames jewels. The doctor, however, has plans to steal the jewels and wants Virginia for himself. An aerial chase ending with a tailspin and crash brings Craig back to his senses. He is able to thwart the doctor's schemes and finally remembers his girlfriend.

== Cast ==
- Ormer Locklear as Captain Norman Craig (credited as Lt. Ormer Locklear)
- Louise Lovely as Virginia Ames
- Sam De Grasse as Dr. Wayne Leveridge
- Ted McCann as William Elmer
- Jack Brammal as "Nobby" Brooks

== Production ==
Ormer Locklear performing one of his famous stunts.

After The Great Air Robbery, which was a commercial success for Universal Pictures, the studio head, Carl Laemmle, did not take up the option for a second film starring Locklear, prompting Locklear's $25,000 lawsuit against Universal. Unwilling to go back to the air show circuit, Locklear wanted to continue his Hollywood career, and in April 1920 was signed to star in The Skywayman for Fox.

Principal photography on The Skywayman began on June 11, 1920, with DeMille Field 2 in Los Angeles as the main base of operations, although scenes were also shot in and around San Francisco. Despite Locklear's public claim that new stunts "more daring [than] ever filmed" would be involved, the production would rely heavily on models and less on actual stunt flying. Two stunts, a church steeple being toppled by Locklear's aircraft and an aircraft-to-train transfer, were both problematic and nearly ended in disaster.

The last stunt scheduled for filming was a nighttime spin, initially to take place in daylight with cameras fitted with red filters to simulate darkness. Locklear, under a lot of pressure, not only with his family life in upheaval but also learning that the studio head, William Fox, was not going to extend his contract beyond one film, demanded that he be allowed to fly at night. The studio relented, and on August 2, 1920, publicity surrounding the stunt led to a large crowd gathering to witness the filming of the unusual stunt. Large studio arc lights were set up on DeMille Field 2 to illuminate the Curtiss "Jenny" as the aircraft entered its final spin, to be turned off when the plane dropped to a certain altitude so as to inform Locklear about his position. The arc lights were never turned off, however, and to shocked spectators and film crew, Locklear and his long-time flying partner Milton "Skeets" Elliot crashed heavily into the sludge pool of an oil well, never pulling out of the spin. Both occupants died instantly at the scene. Lockyer's fiancée, silent film actress Viola Dana, also witnessed the crash and was so traumatized that she refused to fly for the next 25 years.

With the entire film already "in the can" except for the night scene, Fox made the decision to capitalize on the crash and deaths of Locklear and Elliot by rushing The Skywayman into production and release.

== Reception ==
With the lurid notices of The Skywayman proclaiming: "Every Inch Of Film Showing Locklear's Spectacular (And Fatal) Last Flight. His Death-Defying Feats And A Close Up Of His Spectacular Crash To Earth," the film was premiered in Los Angeles. The advertising campaign that accompanied the film was very similar to that of his earlier feature film, focusing on Locklear's earlier exploits, and combining model displays, and exhibition flights across North America to coincide with the film's release. Fox Film Corporation claimed that 10% of the studio profits would go to the families of Locklear and Elliot.

The review in the Los Angeles Times noted: "The greatest monument that could be built to any man – the privilege of living on after all else has gone – is what 'The Skywayman' showing will do. What is gone in the flesh will live on forevermore on the screen." (Note: Ironically, The Skywayman is now considered a lost film; Locklear's true legacy remains as one of the first to bring aviation to the silver screen.)

In Hollywood (1980), a television series on the silent era, actresses Leatrice Joy and Viola Dana recalled Locklear and the making of The Skywayman. A tearful Dana, who was in a relationship with Locklear at the time, described his fatal aerial accident in the "Hazards of the Game" episode. (Note: Although married, Locklear had been dating Viola Dana, and on the night before his death, in a premonition, gave her some of his personal effects.)
