= Durand of the Bad Lands =

Durand of the Bad Lands may refer to:

- A novel by Maibelle Heikes Justice
- Durand of the Bad Lands (1917 film), a silent American film
- Durand of the Bad Lands (1925 film), a silent American film
