= The Gentleman from Indiana (novel) =

1899 novel by Booth Tarkington

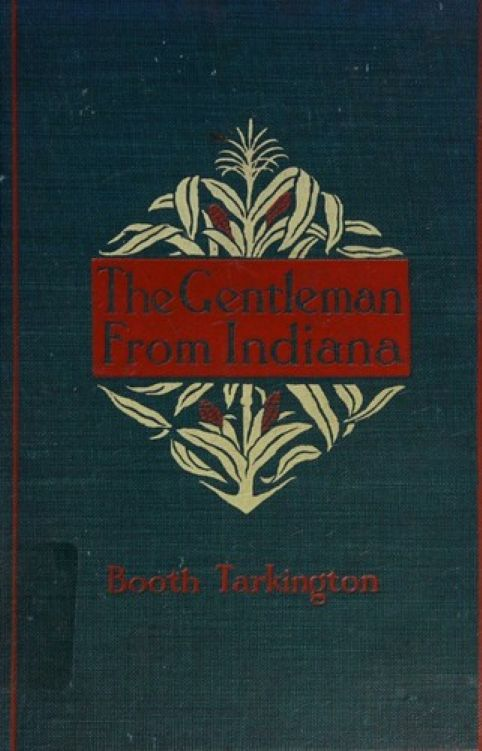
- 1902 edition cover
- Author: Booth Tarkington
- Language: English
- Genre: Romance
- Publisher: Doubleday & McClure Company
- Publication date: October 1899
- Publication place: United States
- Media type: Print

The Gentleman from Indiana is an 1899 romantic novel by the American writer Booth Tarkington. It first appeared as a serial in McClure's Magazine starting May 1899 then was published by Doubleday & McClure Company in New York in October 1899. The story is set in the small town of Plattville, in the equally fictitious Carlow County, Indiana. The protagonist is a young man from the East, who rescues a failing weekly newspaper and a learned drunk, restores civic pride, battles a gang of outcasts, and romances a mysterious belle. The title comes from the novel's conclusion, when the young man is sent to Congress through the political astuteness of his romantic interest.

== Characters ==
Major

- John Harkless – The title figure; tall, shabby in dress, thin but broad-shouldered, and slightly stooped. (Note: Tarkington is coy about revealing the protagonist's name, waiting until Chapter III for the surname and Chapter V for the first name. Later in the book, Harkless tells Helen he was born in Indiana, but grew up in the East, an orphan raised by an elderly cousin.)
- Tom Martin – Gray-bearded widower, insightful store owner, who finds his fellow citizens amusing.
- James Fisbee – Elderly white-bearded ex-professor, rescued from drink and poverty by Harkless.
- Judge Briscoe – Wealthiest inhabitant of Carlow County, whose daughter Minnie runs his household.
- Helen Sherwood – A former classmate of Minnie Briscoe; petite, musical, kindly, and a skilled writer.
- Tom Meredith – Harkless' best friend from college, who now lives in Rouen, Indiana. (Note: A fictional name for a city seventy miles from Plattville that is a stand-in for Terre Haute, Indiana.)

Minor

- Caleb Parker – Young foreman and compositor for the Herald, also from Rouen.
- Kedge Halloway – Honest but uninspired politician whom Harkless helped elect to Congress.
- William Todd – Shy young man, who is a stalwart guardian for Harkless on his evening walks.
- The Imp – A savage and scrawny 14-year-old girl from Six-Cross-Roads, sent to spy in Plattville. (Note: Her ability to scamper around unobserved, her mocking dances and gleeful songs of spite, suggest a malevolent Puck.)
- Lige Willets – Minnie's large and prosperous beau, who is caught unaware while guarding Harkless.
- Ephraim Watts – A large ex-card shark, whom Harkless likes but warns not to resume his former trade.
- Xenophon – Called Zen, is Harkless' elderly black servant, who claims to have the second sight.
- Ross Schofield – Young typesetter for the Herald, and would-be reporter.
- Selina Tibbs – The postmaster's sister and clerk, who writes poetry for the Herald and is admired by Tom Martin.
- Henry Schofield – The Courthouse volunteer bell-ringer, who has trouble telling time and keeping count.
- Bob Skillet – Leader of the Six-Cross-Roads White Caps gang, whose brother and son Harkless sent to prison.
- Wilkerson – The Plattville town drunk, who exhibits every trait an incumbent of the position should possess.
- Warren Smith – The district attorney, a close friend of Harkless.
- James Bardlock – The town marshal, a blundering innocent who is genuinely fascinated by a shell game.
- Jerry the Teller and Slattery – Entrepreneurs of the shell game that Harkless busted up in Plattville.

== Plot summary ==
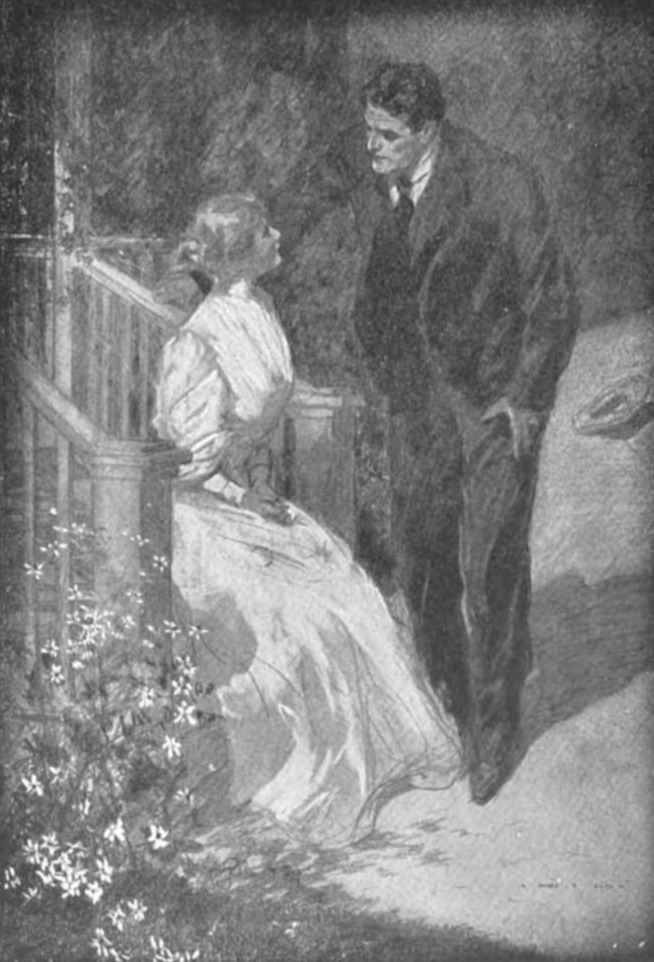

Harkless arrives in Plattville, the seat of Carlow County, having purchased the county's failing weekly newspaper from its rascally former owner. A graduate of an eastern university, he has overpaid for the worthless Carlow County Herald, and is now financially trapped in Plattville. He brings in a young compositor from the nearest city to help produce it, and by gaining the trust of the local farmers eventually makes a going proposition of the paper. He finesses a crooked local bigwig into quietly retiring from politics, replacing him as the county kingmaker. After five years, the paper now publishes three times a week, its columnist being Mr. Fisbee, a former classics professor whom the editor rescued from failure. Harkless is threatened by the local White Caps gang, (Note: Judge Briscoe tells Helen Sherwood the gang takes its name from the real Indiana White Caps but unlike those vigilantes is purely for avenging personal grudges.) and is secretly guarded on his daily walks by young men of the town. The White Caps live seven miles away in the squalid Six-Cross-Roads settlement.

In spite of his melancholy over his exile, Harkless appreciates the natural surroundings and enjoys the friendship of old Tom Martin. Urged to visit the Briscoe's, he does so only after seeing Miss Sherwood's handwritten quote from The Walrus and the Carpenter on the copy Mr. Fisbee turned in to the Herald. As he approaches the Briscoes in the evening, he hears the sounds of Schubert's songs coming from inside the house. (Note: These works, and Beethoven's Moonlight Sonata, which Harkless refers to as the "Angel Sonata" in deference to Helen's performing it, form a shared bond between them.) As he pauses to listen, a shot is fired from a rifle but misses him. Miss Sherwood and Minnie rush out at the noise. William Todd, this evening's guardian of Harkless, fires a flurry of pistol shots towards the clump of trees where the hidden assailant lurked. Miss Sherwood stops Harkless from pursuing the ambusher; she ignores his command to take shelter, so he is forced to carry her back to the house. Later, Harkless is elated at having found his dream girl, which mitigates his sense of failed ambition, but he rues the lightheadedness she induces in him.

On circus day, Harkless is warned that Bob Skillet and his brother were seen coming into Plattvile this morning. Harkless greets Eph Watts, who has returned to Plattville as an oil company rep, scouting for leases. Harkless and Lige Willetts escort Helen and Minnie to Main Street for the circus parade. Harkless recovers money a local lost to the shell game, and with Eph Watts help, stands off a crowd trying to lynch the con men. Bob Skillet tries to take advantage of the fracas to club Harkless but gets a bloody nose instead. On the walk back to the Briscoe's, Harkless remembers suddenly that Helen is Tom Meredith's little cousin whom he met years before. After visiting the circus together, Helen and Harkless recognize their mutual attraction, but Helen warns him she doesn't love him and must leave Plattville. Distraught, Harkless rushes away without his night's escort, Lige Willets.

The only criticism any one has any business making against Congress is that it's too good for some of the men we send there. Congress is our great virtue, understand; the congressmen are our fault.

— Judge Briscoe, The Gentleman from Indiana, page 428

Set upon by the White Caps led by Bob Skillet, Harkless is beaten, shot, and dumped half-dead into an empty box car, which carries him to Rouen. Unsure of his fate, but knowing the White Caps are responsible, the men of Plattville descend on the Six-Cross-Roads settlement, singing John Brown's Body as they march. They defeat an ambush along the road then burn down Skillet's saloon and residence, before Warren Smith recalls them to order.

As Harkless recovers in a Rouen hospital, Fisbee and Parker try to keep the Herald going, but are at a loss for content. Fisbee explains that Helen Sherwood is his daughter, given up to his sister-in-law after her mother's death. With Parker's assent, he sends for her; she takes over the editorship of the paper and also becomes it principal contributor. Harkless is kept in ignorance. He knows only that a relative of James Fisbee, called "H. Fisbee", is now editing the paper, quite successfully. Under Helen's guidance, the Herald becomes a daily, while she arranges for the local nominating convention to select Harkless over Kedge Halloway, without the former's knowledge. Rushing back to Plattville, Harkless is greeted by the news, and thousands of his cheering future constituents. Helen tells him she did this out of gratitude, refusing to acknowledge love played a role as that would have been too brazen of her. Fortunately, Harkless sees through this flimsy justification and they embrace.

== Background ==
Booth Tarkington was a socially-prominent figure in Indianapolis up through 1898, known for his activities with the local Dramatic Club and alumni associations. (Note: He had also appeared in newspapers as a crime victim, having been robbed at gunpoint by three Negro men during October 1898.) According to one account, Tarkington had begun writing The Gentleman from Indiana in 1894, but had put it aside for some other stories. He subsequently submitted it to McClure's Magazine, where editor Viola Roseboro' described it as having been "sent by God Almighty".

A newspaper report from November 1898 said a manuscript of his had been accepted by McClure's Magazine. It was a story set in Bath, Somerset during the days of Beau Nash, concerning "the adventures of a certain French prince". Though this refers to the plot of Tarkington's future story Monsieur Beaucaire, a month later the title accepted was said to be The Gentleman from Indiana, and that the story would be serialized in McClure's Magazine before being published in book form.

Tarkington went to New York City at the end of January 1899, to arrange for publication of his story. There he stayed with S. S. McClure, meeting Rudyard Kipling, who was a contributor to McClure's Magazine. The Indianapolis News printed a short profile of Tarkington, including his academic background and a list of plays he had written for the Indianapolis Dramatic Club. The first three chapters appeared at the end of the May 1899 issue of McClure's Magazine, the main feature of which was Kipling's "The Flag of Their Country", another Stalky & Co. story. The abridged serial concluded with the October 1899 issue of McClure's, and that same month a first book edition of 5,000 copies was published by Doubleday & McClure Company. The book's first edition was followed by a second edition of another 5,000 copies with a month.

== Reception ==
Local reaction to the serial's start was immediately positive, while out-of-state opinion was also good, if less florid on the story's merits. Within a month of the book's publication, it began to receive attention from reviewers. One New York critic thought it very good for a first novel, presenting well-defined secondary characters at the expense of the two romantic leads, who remained unclear as people. Indiana reviewers tended to predominate among serious criticism of the book. Pearl Meharry said that The Gentlemen from Indiana was similar to the also recently published An Idyl of the Wabash by Anna Nicholas in making a Hoosier want to write about their state. She described Tarkington's story as "all so familiar and all so natural", yet had the power and unity of a "prose drama". R. M. Milburn, writing for a Jasper, Indiana newspaper, noted how closely the story resonated with DuBois County residents in their own struggle against local White Caps.

By the end of January 1900, The Gentleman from Indiana was Doubleday & McClure's best seller, topping Kipling's Stalky & Co., Bob, Son of Battle by Alfred Ollivant, and Dracula by Bram Stoker.

== Adaptations ==
=== Stage ===
- The Gentleman from Indiana was dramatized by Tarkington as a four-act play in 1903, but wasn't produced by Liebler & Company until February 1905. Staged by Eugene Presbrey and starring Edward J. Morgan and Julia Dean, it had a week's tryout in Indianapolis, followed by a week in Boston during April 1905 with Clara Bloodgood taking the female lead. Producer George C. Tyler said Tarkington's dramatization "read like a million dollars", but when put on stage "it just plain wouldn't rehearse".

=== Film ===
- The Gentleman from Indiana is a 1915 silent film, adapted by Julia Crawford Ivers from Tarkington's novel. Directed by Frank Lloyd, the five-reel movie stars Dustin Farnum and Winifred Kingston. It was the first film made by Pallas Pictures for distribution by Paramount.

== Bibliography ==
- Booth Tarkington. The Gentleman from Indiana. Doubleday, Page & Company, 1926 (1899).
- George C. Tyler and J. C. Furnas. Whatever Goes Up. Bobbs Merrill, 1934.
