= Cameo Kirby =

Cameo Kirby can refer to:

- Cameo Kirby (play), a 1909 Broadway play written by Booth Tarkington and Harry Leon Wilson, or its three screen adaptations:
  - Cameo Kirby (1914 film), a 1914 silent American film
  - Cameo Kirby (1923 film), a 1923 silent American film
  - Cameo Kirby (1930 film), a talkie by Fox Film Corporation
