= The Gentleman from Indiana =

1915 American film by Frank Lloyd

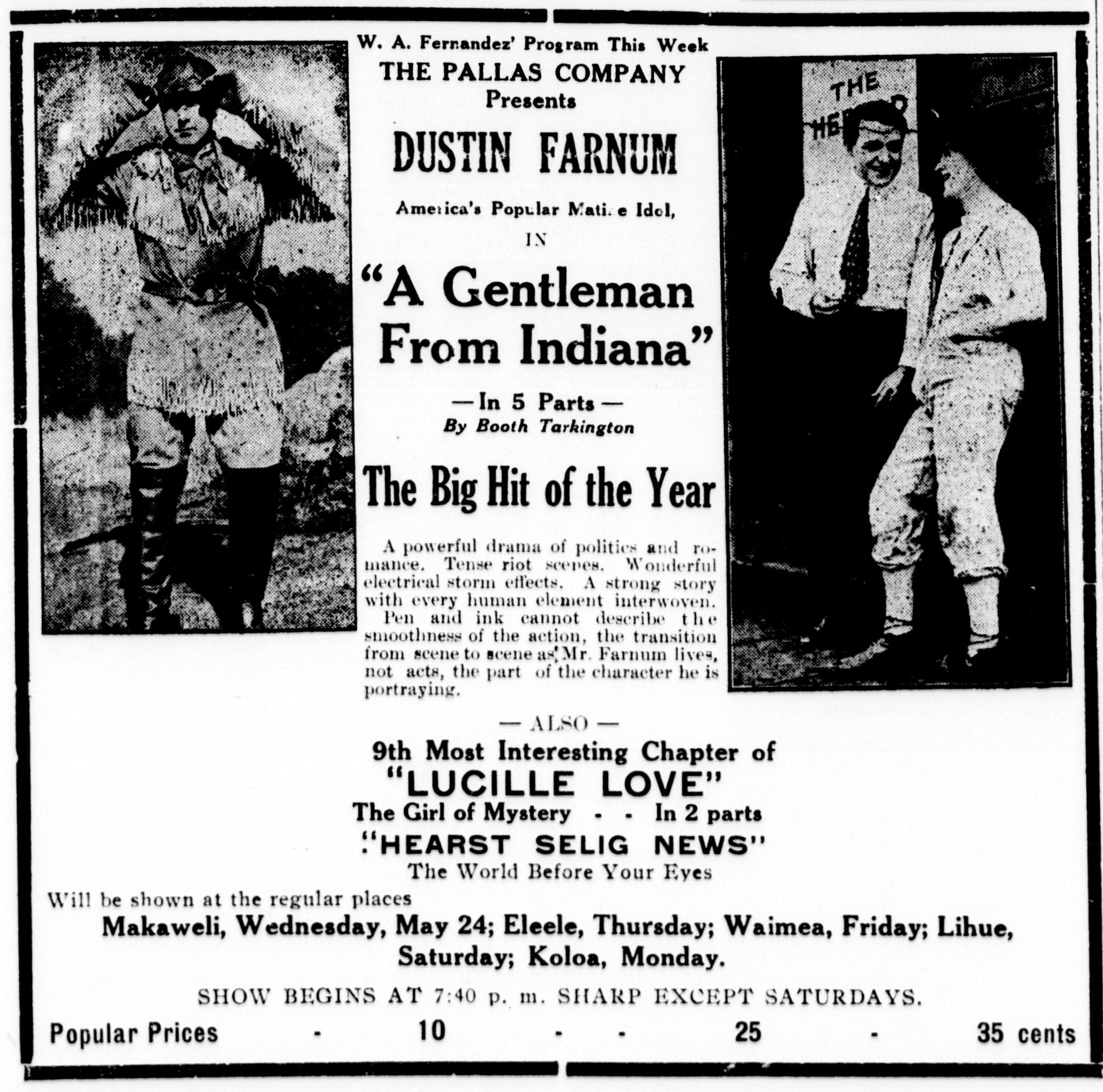
- Newspaper advertisement.
- Directed by: Frank Lloyd
- Screenplay by: Julia Crawford Ivers; Frank Lloyd
- Based on: The Gentleman from Indiana by Booth Tarkington
- Starring: Dustin Farnum; Winifred Kingston; Herbert Standing; Page Peters; Howard Davies; Juan de la Cruz
- Cinematography: F.A. Dobson
- Production company: Pallas Pictures
- Distributed by: Paramount Pictures
- Release date: November 28, 1915
- Running time: 50 minutes
- Country: United States
- Language: Silent (English intertitles)

The Gentleman from Indiana is a surviving 1915 American silent drama film directed by Frank Lloyd and written by Julia Crawford Ivers and Frank Lloyd after the novel by Booth Tarkington. The film stars Dustin Farnum, Winifred Kingston, Herbert Standing, Page Peters, Howard Davies, and Juan de la Cruz. The film was released on November 28, 1915, by Paramount Pictures.

== Plot ==
The film was advertised as a "a powerful drama of politics and romance".

== Cast ==
- Dustin Farnum as John Harkless
- Winifred Kingston as Helen Sherwood
- Herbert Standing as Joe Fisbee
- Page Peters as Lige Willets
- Howard Davies as Rodney McCune
- Juan de la Cruz as Tom Meredith
- Joe Ray as Skillett
- Elsie Cort as Skillett's Girl
- C. Norman Hammond as Judge Briscoe
- Helen Jerome Eddy

== Preservation status ==
A print of The Gentleman from Indiana is preserved in the Library of Congress collection, Packard Campus for Audio-Visual Conservation.
