= Davy Crockett (1916 film) =

1916 film

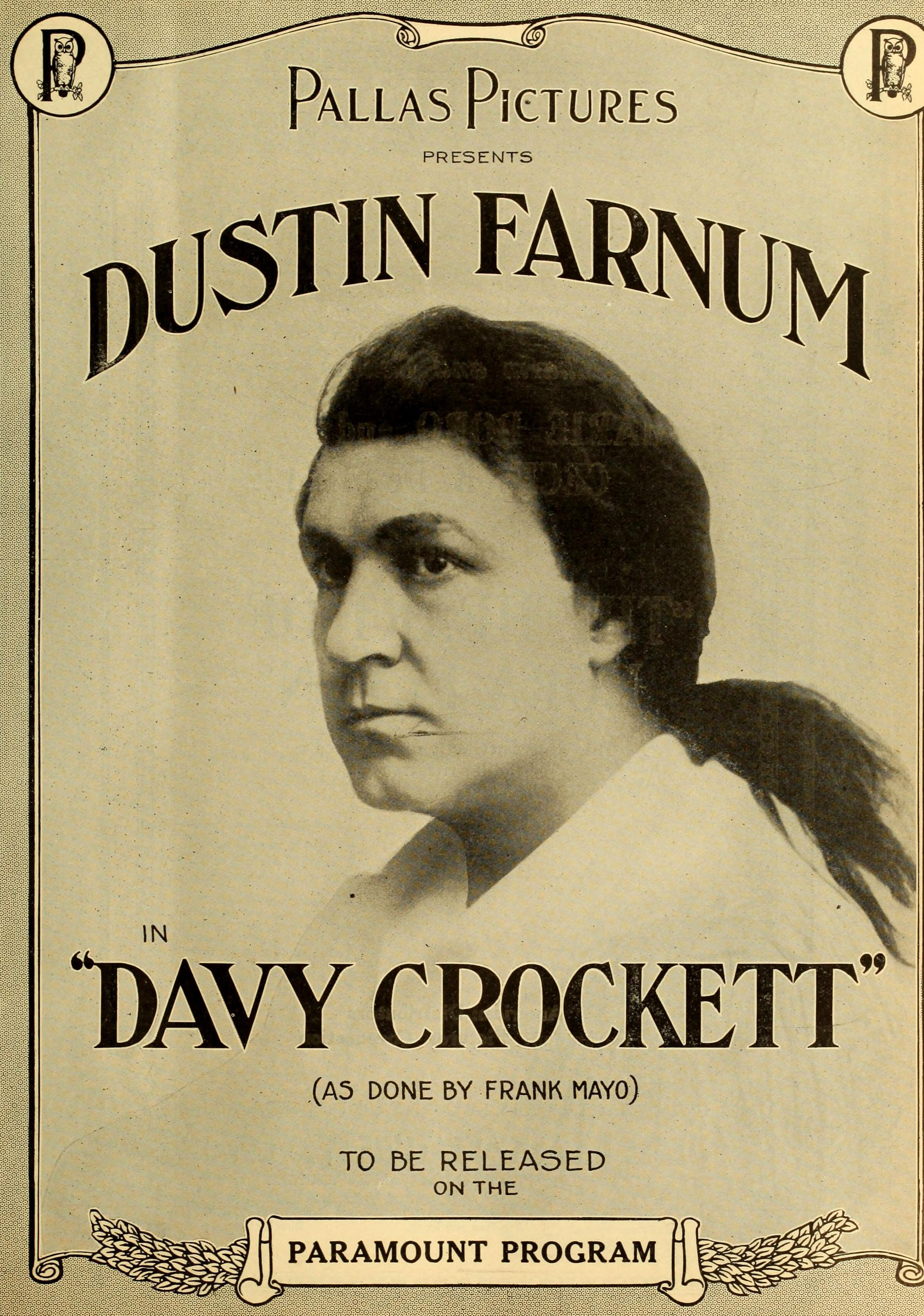
- Directed by: William Desmond Taylor
- Written by: Frank Murdock
- Produced by: Pallas Pictures
- Starring: Dustin Farnum
- Cinematography: Homer Scott
- Production company: Paramount Pictures
- Release date: July 16, 1916
- Running time: 50 minutes
- Country: United States
- Languages: Silent; English intertitles

Davy Crockett is a 1916 American silent Western film starring Dustin Farnum as Davy Crockett, with Winifred Kingston, Harry De Vere, Herbert Standing, Howard Davies, Page Peters, Lydia Yeamans Titus and Ida Darling. The film was directed by William Desmond Taylor and produced by Pallas Pictures.

The film was commercially released in the United States and distributed by Paramount Pictures. It is not known whether the film currently survives, suggesting that it may be a lost film.
