= The Caprices of Kitty =

1915 film by Phillips Smalley

- Directed by: Phillips Smalley
- Written by: Elsie Janis
- Starring: Elsie Janis; Courtenay Foote; Herbert Standing; Vera Lewis; Martha Mattox; Myrtle Stedman
- Cinematography: George W. Hill
- Production company: Hobart Bosworth Productions
- Distributed by: Paramount Pictures
- Release date: March 8, 1915
- Running time: 50 minutes
- Country: United States
- Languages: Silent; English intertitles

The Caprices of Kitty is a 1915 American silent comedy film directed by Phillips Smalley and written by Elsie Janis. The film stars Elsie Janis, Courtenay Foote, Herbert Standing, Vera Lewis, Martha Mattox and Myrtle Stedman. The film was released on March 8, 1915, by Paramount Pictures.

== Cast ==
- Elsie Janis as Katherine Bradley
- Courtenay Foote as Gerald Cameron
- Herbert Standing as Kitty's Guardian
- Vera Lewis as Miss Smyth
- Martha Mattox as Miss Rawlins
- Myrtle Stedman as Elaine Vernon

== Preservation status ==
- A print of the film is preserved in the Library of Congress collection Packard Campus Culpepper.
