= Where the Trail Divides =

1914 film

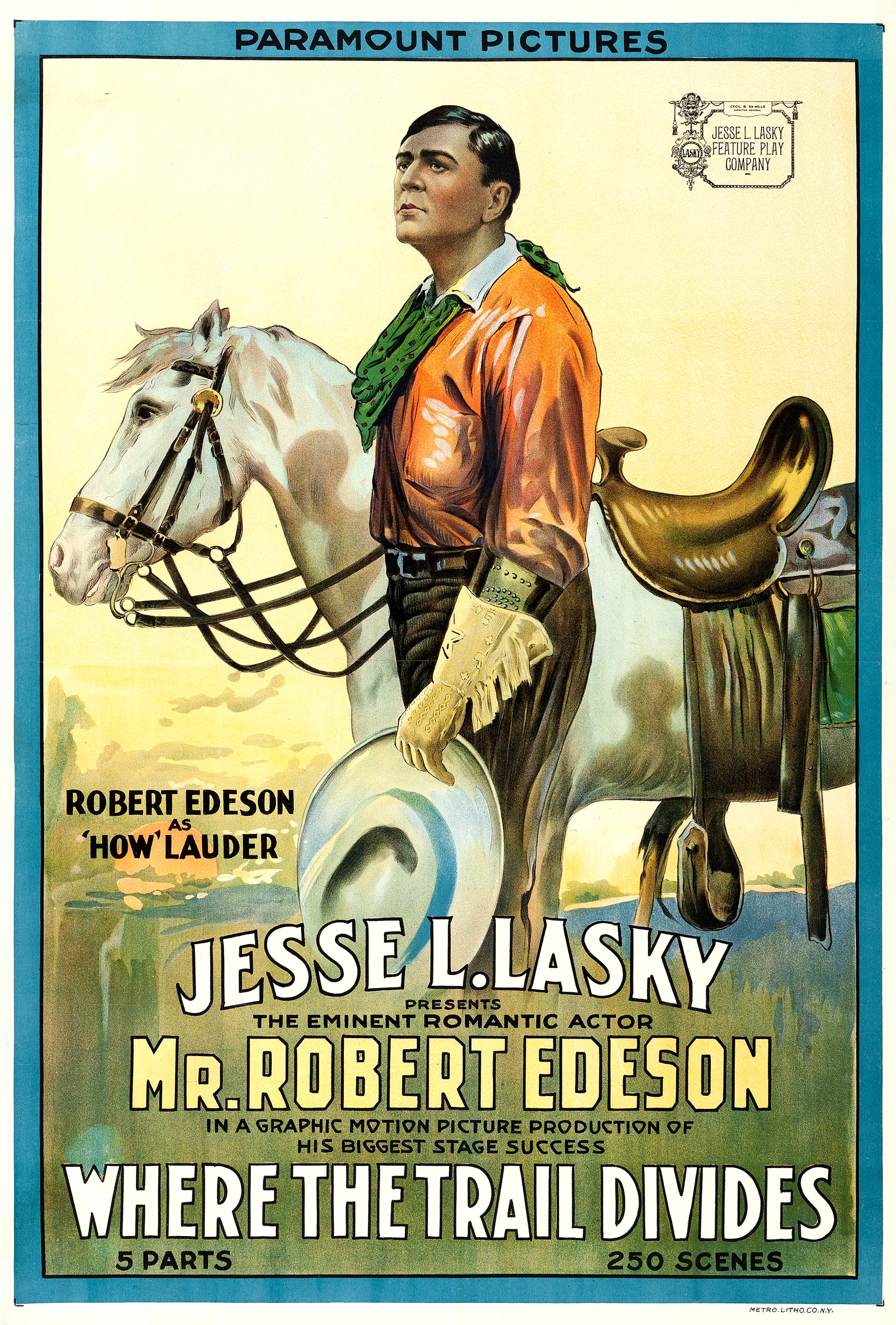
- Theatrical release poster
- Directed by: James Neill
- Screenplay by: William Otis Lillibridge
- Starring: Robert Edeson; Theodore Roberts; J. W. Johnston; Winifred Kingston; James Neill; Constance Adams
- Cinematography: Robert L. Carson
- Production company: Jesse L. Lasky Feature Play Company
- Distributed by: Paramount Pictures
- Release date: October 12, 1914
- Country: United States
- Languages: Silent; English intertitles

Where the Trail Divides is a 1914 American silent Western film directed by James Neill and written by William Otis Lillibridge. The film stars Robert Edeson, Theodore Roberts, J. W. Johnston, Winifred Kingston, James Neill and Constance Adams. The film was released on October 12, 1914, by Paramount Pictures.

== Cast ==
- Robert Edeson as 'How' Landor
- Theodore Roberts as Colonel William Landor
- J. W. Johnston as Clayton Craig
- Winifred Kingston as Bess Landor
- James Neill as Sam Rowland
- Constance Adams as Mrs Rowland
- Fred Montague as Rev. John Eaton
- Antrim Short as Little 'How'
- Mary Higby as Little Bess
