= Sunshine Molly =

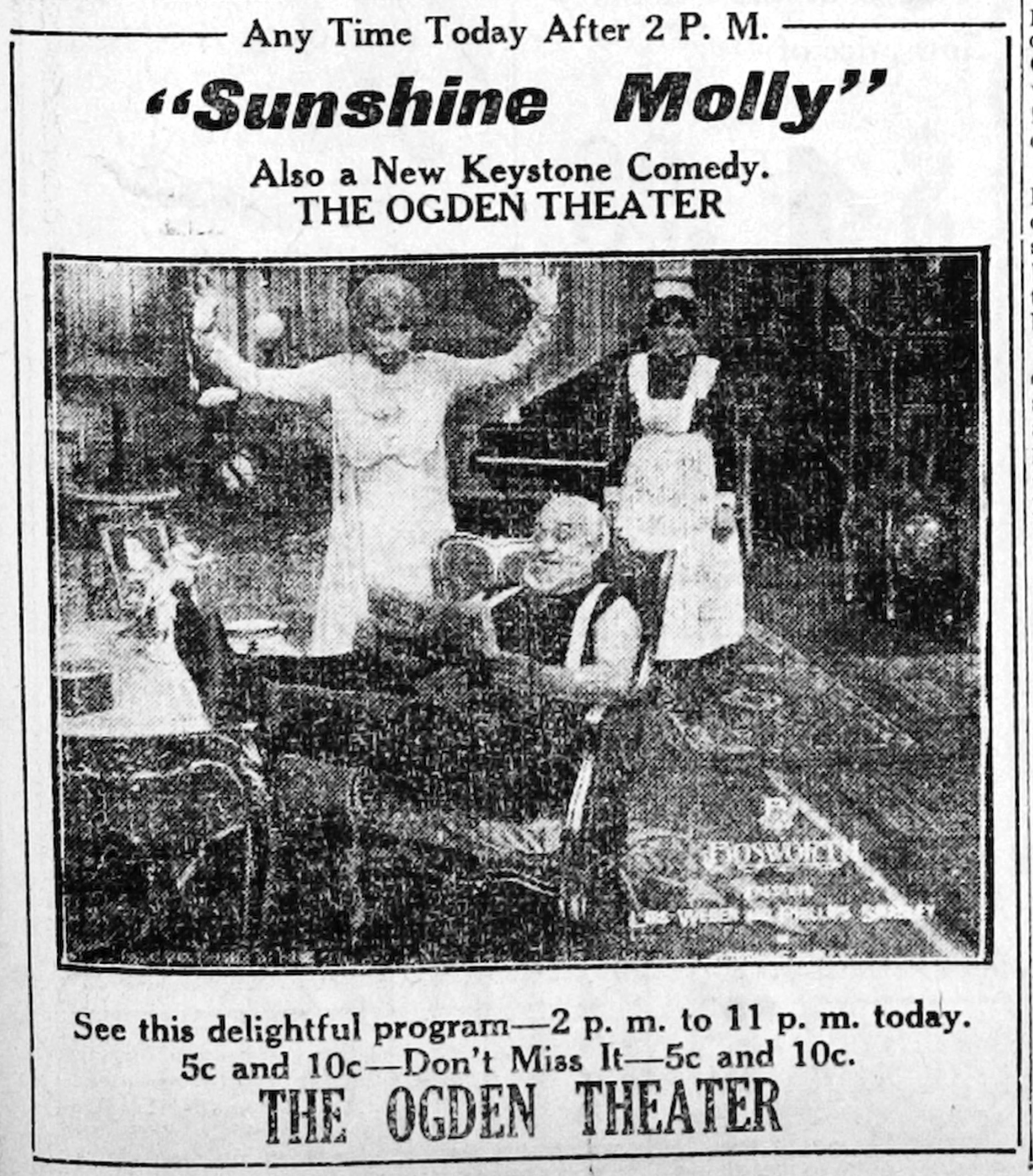
- Newspaper advertisement
- Directed by: Phillips Smalley; Lois Weber
- Screenplay by: Lois Weber
- Story by: Alice von Saxmar
- Produced by: Phillips Smalley; Lois Weber
- Starring: Lois Weber; Phillips Smalley; Adele Farrington; Margaret Edwards; Herbert Standing; Vera Lewis
- Cinematography: Dal Clawson
- Production companies: Hobart Bosworth Productions; Oliver Morosco Photoplay Company
- Distributed by: Paramount Pictures
- Release date: March 18, 1915
- Running time: 36 minutes
- Country: United States
- Language: English

Sunshine Molly is an extant 1915 American silent film directed by Phillips Smalley and Lois Weber and written by Lois Weber. The film stars Lois Weber, Phillips Smalley, Adele Farrington, Margaret Edwards, Herbert Standing and Vera Lewis. The film was released on March 18, 1915, by Paramount Pictures. Surviving reels were released on DVD and Blu-ray in 2018.

== Plot ==
Surviving footage from Sunshine Molly

== Cast ==
- Lois Weber as Sunshine Molly
- Phillips Smalley as 'Bull' Forrest
- Adele Farrington as Widow Budd
- Margaret Edwards as Mirra Budd
- Herbert Standing as Pat O'Brien
- Vera Lewis as Mrs. O'Brien
- Roberta Hickman as Patricia O'Brien
- Frank Elliott as Patricia's Fiancé
- Charles Marriott as Old Pete

== Preservation status ==
A print is preserved in the Library of Congress collection Packard Campus. It contains all reels except for reels 3 & 4.
