= Herbert Standing =

British actor (1846–1923)

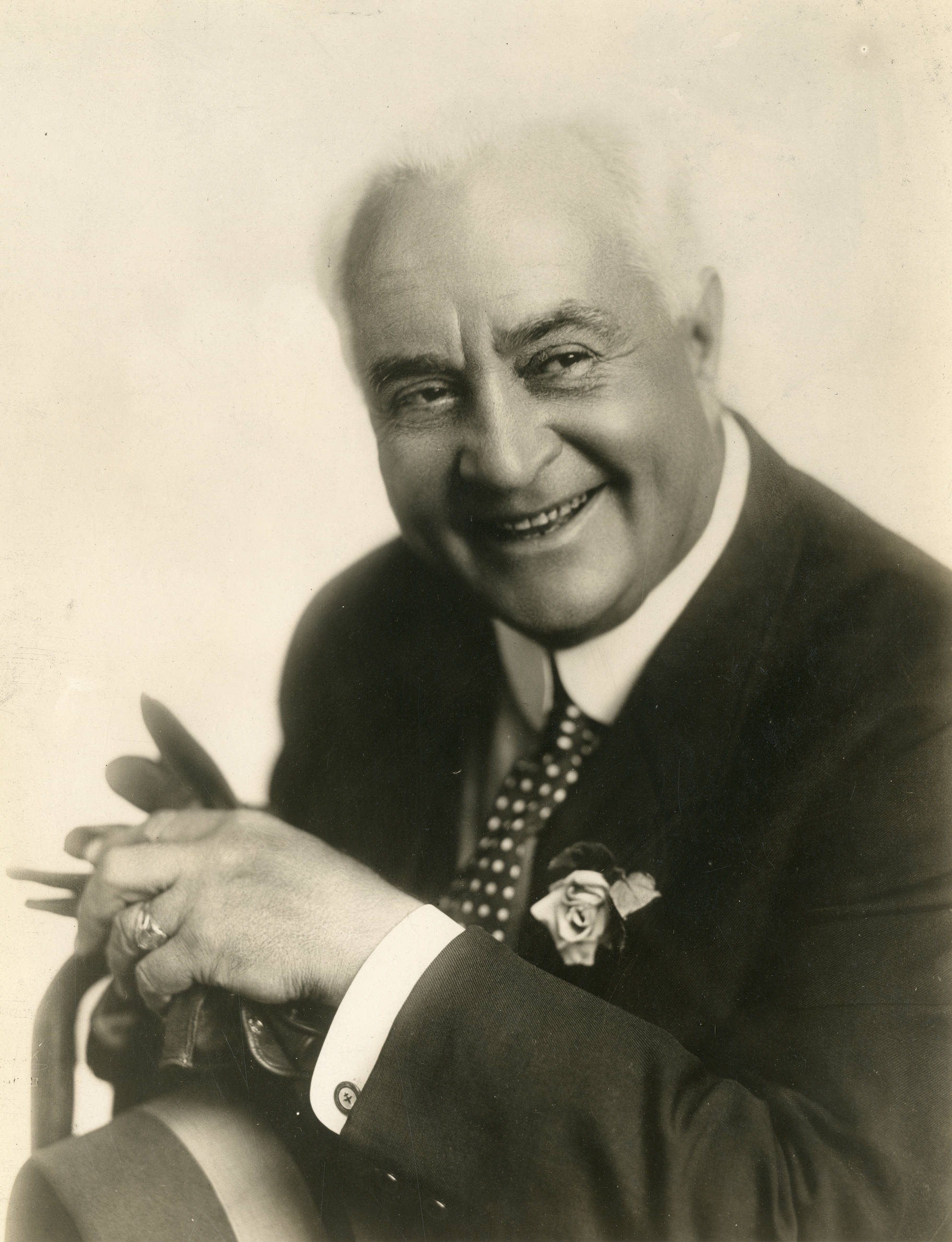
- Standing in 1914
- Born: 13 November 1846; Peckham, London, England
- Died: 5 December 1923 (aged 77); Los Angeles, California, US
- Occupation: actor
- Years active: 1867–1923
- Spouse: Emilie Browne
- Children: Guy Standing; Wyndham Standing; Percy Standing; Jack Standing
- Relatives: Joan Standing (granddaughter); Kay Hammond (granddaughter); John Standing (great grandson); William T. Carleton (brother)

Herbert Standing (13 November 1846 – 5 December 1923), also known as Herbert Crellin, was a British stage and screen actor and the patriarch of the Standing family of actors. He was the father of numerous children, many of whom had careers in theatre and cinema. Toward the end of his life, he appeared in many Hollywood silent films.

Standing began in theatre in 1867, and turned to films in 1913.

Standing's children include Sir Guy Standing, Wyndham Standing, Percy Standing, Jack Standing, Herbert Standing Jr. and Aubrey Standing. Grandchildren involved in show business were Joan Standing, Kay Hammond, Guy Standing Jr. and Jack Standing Jr. Present-day character actor John Standing (son of Kay Hammond) is a great-grandson. Herbert Standing was the brother of William T. Carleton, a well-known opera singer.

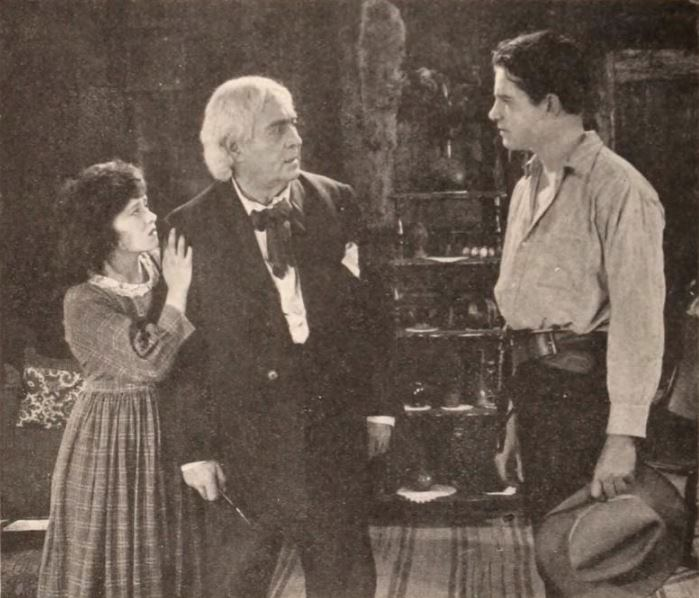
Still from the American drama film The Blue Moon (1920) with Elinor Field, Herbert Standing, and Pell Trenton

== Partial filmography ==
- The Geisha (1914)
- False Colors (1914)
- Jane (1915)
- Hypocrites (1915)
- Buckshot John (1915)
- The Caprices of Kitty (1915)
- Sunshine Molly (1915)
- Captain Courtesy (1915)
- Help Wanted (1915)
- Betty in Search of a Thrill (1915)
- The Wild Olive (1915)
- The Rug Maker's Daughter (1915)
- Kilmeny (1915)
- The Majesty of the Law (1915)
- The Yankee Girl (1915)
- The Gentleman from Indiana (1915)
- The Tongues of Men (1916)
- The Call of the Cumberlands (1916)
- Madame la Presidente (1916)
- Ben Blair (1916)
- The Code of Marcia Gray (1916)
- The Heart of Paula (1916)
- David Garrick (1916)
- Davy Crockett (1916)
- An International Marriage (1916)
- The Stronger Love (1916)
- The House of Lies (1916)
- The Intrigue (1916)
- Her Father's Son (1916)
- The Right Direction (1916)
- Redeeming Love (1916)
- The Spirit of Romance (1917)
- The Man from Painted Post (1917)
- The Hidden Spring (1917)
- The Little Patriot (1917)
- Down to Earth (1917)
- Stella Maris (1918)
- Amarilly of Clothes-Line Alley (1918)
- The White Man's Law (1918)
- How Could You, Jean? (1918)
- He Comes Up Smiling (1918)
- Wild Honey (1918)
- The Squaw Man (1918)
- In Judgement Of (1918)
- You Never Saw Such a Girl (1919)
- The Home Town Girl (1919)
- A Rogue's Romance (1919)
- My Little Sister (1919)
- A Sporting Chance (1919)
- Through the Wrong Door (1919)
- Lord and Lady Algy (1919)
- Almost a Husband (1919)
- A Misfit Earl (1919)
- The Cup of Fury (1920)
- Judy of Rogue's Harbor (1920)
- Don't Ever Marry (1920)
- Simple Souls (1920)
- The Blue Moon (1920)
- Her First Elopement (1920)
- Heritage (1920)
- Man and Woman (1920)
- She Couldn't Help It (1920)
- One Wild Week (1921)
- The Man Worth While (1921)
- The Crossroads of New York (1922)
- The Masquerader (1922)
- The Trap (1922)
- While Satan Sleeps (1922)
- The Impossible Mrs. Bellew (1922)
- Sawdust (1923)
