= Captain Courtesy =

1915 American silent film by Phillips Smalley

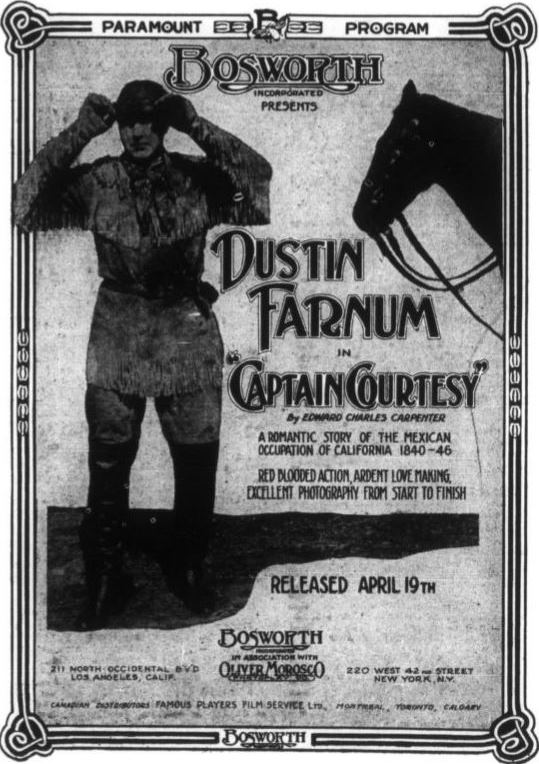
- Advertisement
- Directed by: Phillips Smalley; Lois Weber
- Based on: Captain Courtesy by Edward Childs Carpenter
- Produced by: Oliver Morosco
- Starring: Dustin Farnum; Courtenay Foote; Winifred Kingston; Herbert Standing; Jack Hoxie
- Cinematography: Dal Clawson
- Production companies: Hobart Bosworth Productions; Oliver Morosco Photoplay Company
- Distributed by: Paramount Pictures
- Release date: April 19, 1915
- Running time: 50 minutes
- Country: United States
- Language: Silent (English intertitles)

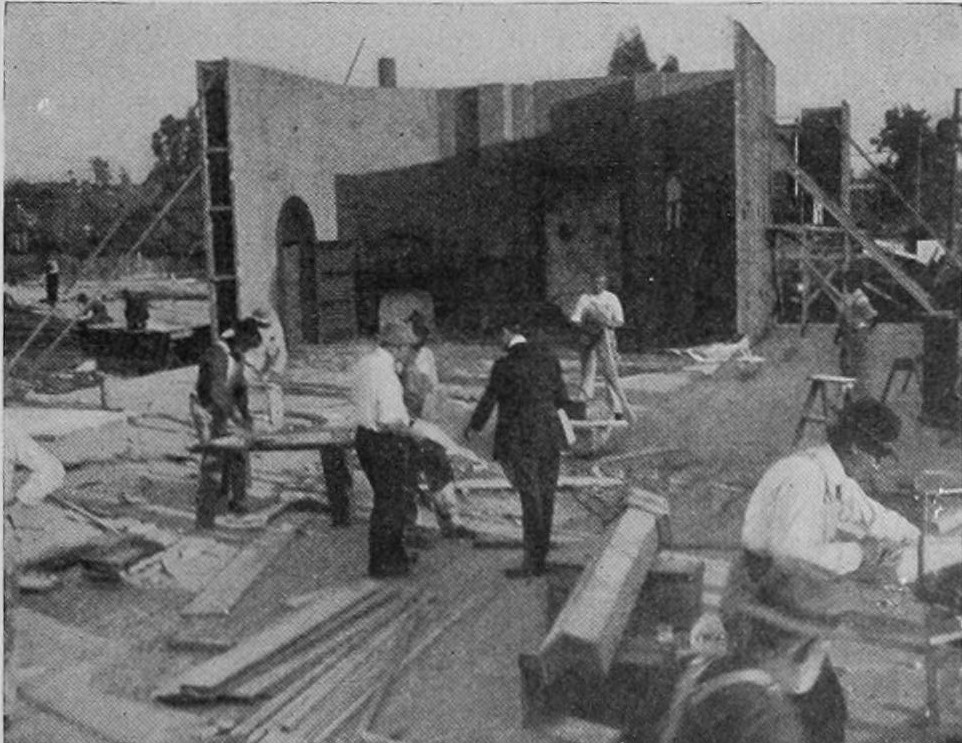
Building one of the sets for the film.

Captain Courtesy is a lost 1915 American silent drama film directed by Phillips Smalley and Lois Weber based upon a novel by Edward Childs Carpenter. The film stars Dustin Farnum, Courtenay Foote, Winifred Kingston, Herbert Standing, and Jack Hoxie. The film was released on April 19, 1915, by Paramount Pictures.

== Plot ==
Set against the events surrounding the formation of the California Republic on June 14, 1846, and its occupation by United States forces on July 9, 1846, Dustin Farnum plays the son of American settlers of Alta California who when he was a young boy were killed by the Mexicans, upon whom he has vowed revenge. Now a young man, he invents the persona of "Captain Courtesy," a mysterious masked defender of Americans' rights in the Alta California territory. An American-style Robin Hood, he robs wealthy Mexicans and gives the plunder to his fellow Americans. Courtenay Foote plays a renegade American spying for the Mexicans who encounters Captain Courtesy at a mission and informs the Mexican authorities, who dispatch military troops to capture him. Captain Courtesy rides out of the mission, encounters a troop of American cavalrymen, and leads them back to the mission in time to liberate the local Americans. He learns that the American spy was responsible for his parents' death, but the woman he loves stops him from exacting revenge.

The pictured 1915 advertisement in Variety (which erroneously lists the author as "Edward Charles Carpenter), subtitled "A romantic story of the Mexican occupation of California, 1840-1846", depicts a man clad in buckskins and promises "red blooded action, ardent love making, excellent photography from start to finish."

== Cast ==
- Dustin Farnum as Leonardo Davis
- Courtenay Foote as George Granville
- Winifred Kingston as Eleanor
- Herbert Standing as Father Reinaldo
- Jack Hoxie as Martinez
- Carl von Schiller as Jocoso
- Winona Brown as Indian Girl Servant
