= The Intrigue =

1916 film by Frank Lloyd

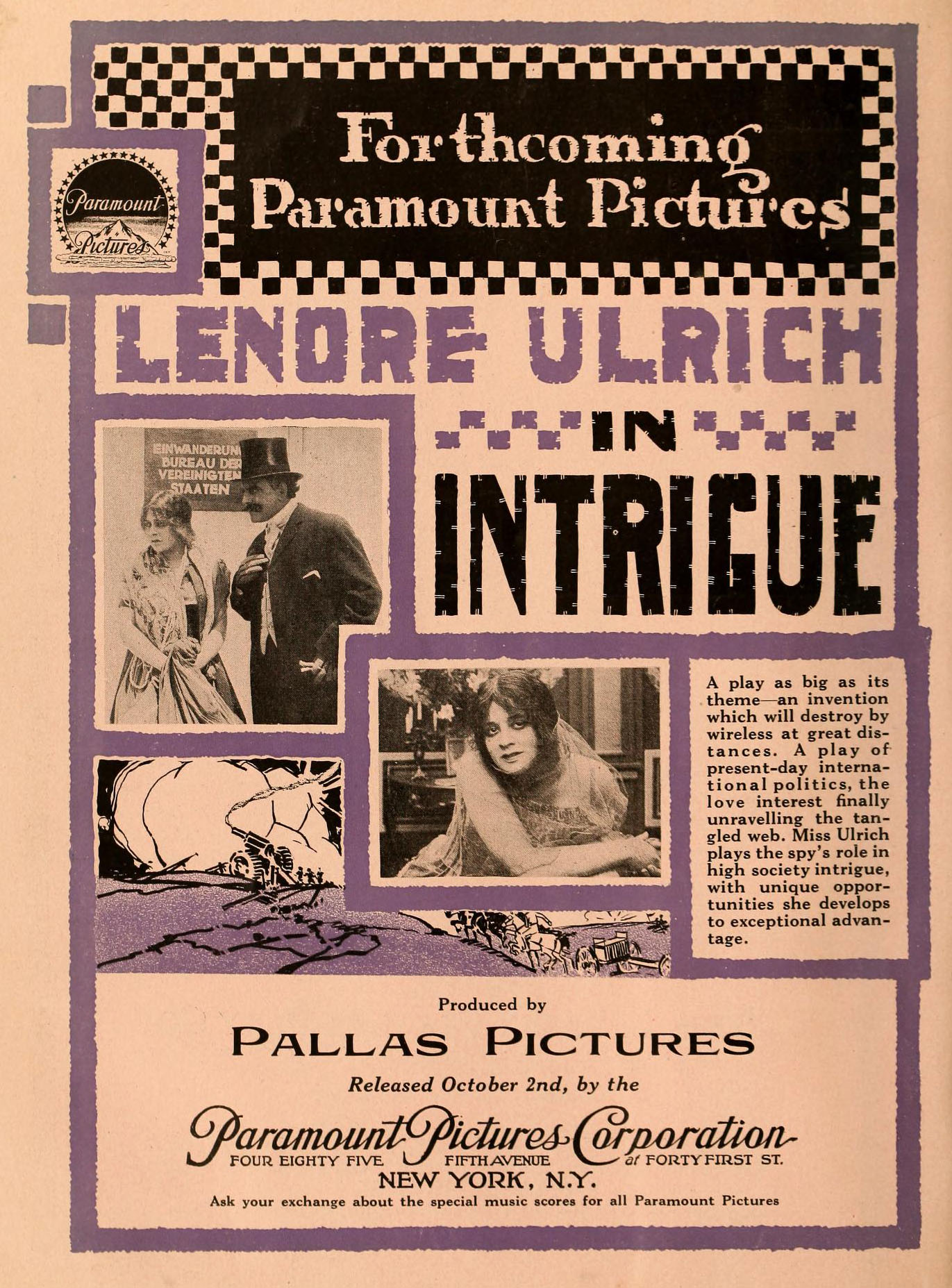
- Directed by: Frank Lloyd
- Written by: Julia Crawford Ivers (scenario)
- Produced by: Pallas
- Cinematography: James Van Trees
- Distributed by: Paramount Pictures
- Release date: October 9, 1916
- Running time: 50 minutes (5 reels)
- Country: United States
- Language: Silent film (English intertitles)

The Intrigue is a surviving 1916 American silent drama film produced by Pallas Pictures and released through Paramount Pictures. Frank Lloyd directed the film which was written by Julia Crawford Ivers and photographed by her son James Van Trees. The star is young Lenore Ulric and a young, then-unknown King Vidor makes one of his earliest appearances in a film as an actor. The movie is also one of the earliest surviving films of Vidor's wife Florence. The film is extant at the Library of Congress along with several early Lloyd directed films from 1915/16.

The Intrigue (1916)

== Cast ==
- Lenore Ulric - Countess Sonia Varnli
- Cecil Van Auker - Guy Longstreet
- Howard Davies - Baron Rogniat
- Florence Vidor - Pseudo Countess Sonia
- Paul Weigel - Attache to the Baron
- Herbert Standing - The Emperor

unbilled

- Dustin Farnum
- Winifred Kingston
- King Vidor
