= David Garrick (1916 film) =

1916 film by Frank Lloyd

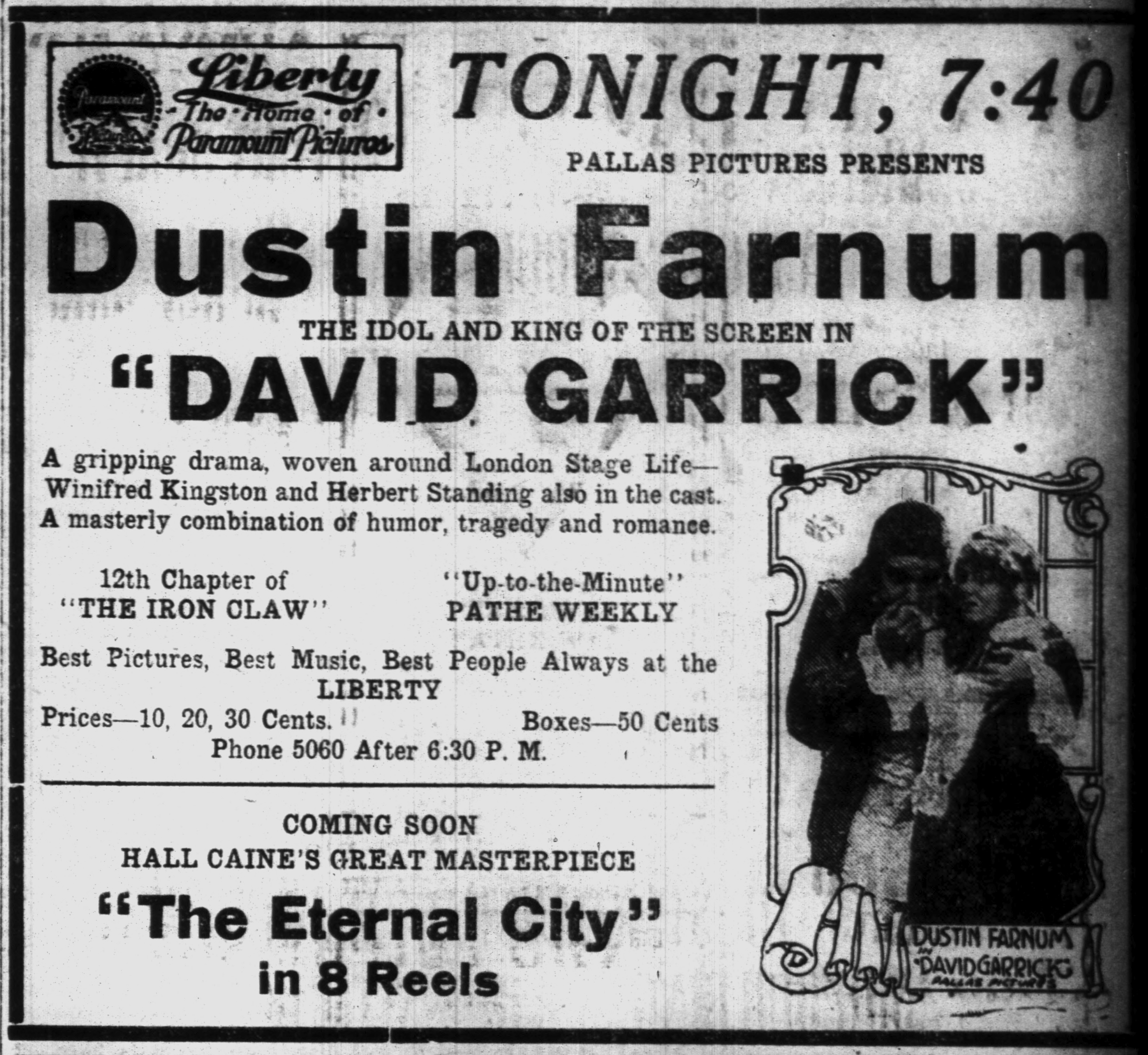
- Newspaper advertisement.
- Directed by: Frank Lloyd
- Written by: Tom W. Robertson (play); Julia Crawford Ivers
- Based on: David Garrick by Thomas William Robertson
- Starring: Dustin Farnum; Winifred Kingston; Herbert Standing
- Cinematography: James Van Trees
- Production company: Pallas Pictures
- Distributed by: Paramount Pictures
- Release date: April 30, 1916
- Running time: 50 minutes
- Country: United States
- Languages: Silent; English intertitles

David Garrick is a 1916 American silent historical film directed by Frank Lloyd and starring Dustin Farnum, Winifred Kingston and Herbert Standing. The film was based on Thomas William Robertson's 1864 play of the same name, which portrayed the life of the eighteenth century British actor David Garrick. It was one of several film versions of the play made during the silent era.

== Cast ==
- Dustin Farnum as David Garrick
- Winifred Kingston as Ada Ingot
- Herbert Standing as Simon Ingot
- Frank A. Bonn as Squire Richard Chivy
- Lydia Yeamans Titus as Araminta
- Olive White as Ada's Aunt
- Mary Mersch as Fanny Lacy

== Bibliography ==
- Goble, Alan. The Complete Index to Literary Sources in Film. Walter de Gruyter, 1999.
