= Through the Wrong Door =

1919 film by Clarence G. Badger

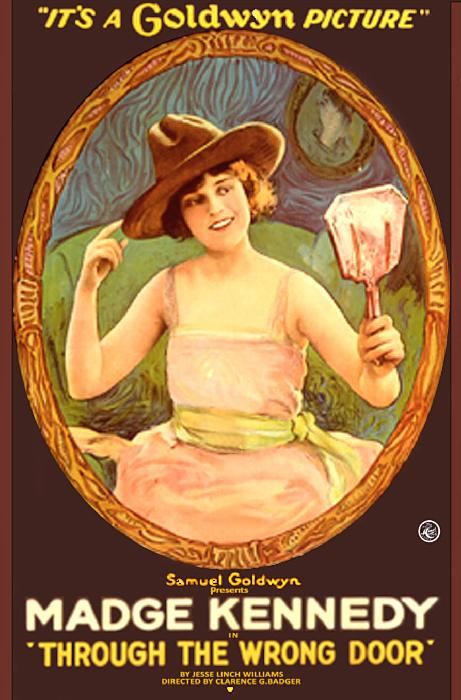
- Theatrical release poster
- Directed by: Clarence G. Badger
- Written by: Rex Taylor (scenario)
- Based on: The Wrong Door by Jesse Lynch Williams
- Starring: Madge Kennedy; John Bowers; Herbert Standing; J.B. Manly; Bob Kortman
- Cinematography: Marcel Le Picard
- Production company: Goldwyn Pictures
- Distributed by: Goldwyn Pictures
- Release date: July 20, 1919
- Running time: 5 reels
- Country: United States
- Languages: Silent film (English intertitles)

Through the Wrong Door is a lost 1919 American silent romantic comedy film directed by Clarence G. Badger and starring Madge Kennedy, John Bowers, Herbert Standing, J.B. Manly, and Bob Kortman. It is based on a story The Wrong Door by Jesse Lynch Williams. The film was released by Goldwyn Pictures on July 20, 1919.

== Cast ==
- Madge Kennedy as Isabel Carter
- John Bowers as Burt Radcliffe
- Herbert Standing as Haskell Carter
- J.B. Manly as Gerald Hopkins
- Bob Kortman as James (as Robert Kortman)
- Kate Lester as Mrs. Carter
- Beulah Peyton as Mrs. Lippin
- Betty Schade as Vera Lippin

== Preservation ==
With no holdings located in archives, Through the Wrong Door is considered a lost film.
