= The Light of Western Stars (1918 film) =

1918 film

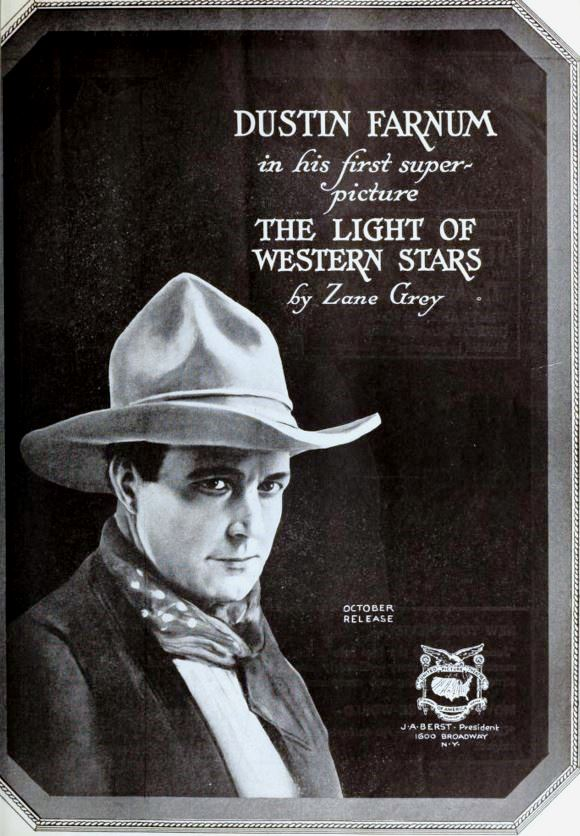
- Advertisement
- Directed by: Charles Swickard
- Written by: Roy Clements (scenario)
- Based on: The Light of Western Stars by Zane Grey
- Produced by: Harry Sherman Productions
- Starring: Dustin Farnum; Winifred Kingston
- Cinematography: Homer Scott
- Production company: Harry Sherman Productions
- Distributed by: United Picture Theatres of America Inc.
- Release date: November 1918
- Running time: 70 minutes
- Country: United States
- Languages: Silent; English intertitles

The Light of the Western Stars is a lost 1918 American silent Western film starring Dustin Farnum and Winifred Kingston. Charles Swickard directed. It is based on the 1914 novel by Zane Grey.

== Plot ==
As described in a film magazine, discontented cow puncher Gene Stewart (Farnum) makes a bet that he will marry the next woman who comes to town. Majesty Hammond (Kingston), the sister of a successful ranch owner, arrives that night and Gene in a drunken revel threatens old Padre Marcos (Swickard) with death unless he marries them. He completely cows the young woman into submission and, when he finds out who she is, he sheepishly takes her to the house of her brother's fiancé, and then leaves after apologizing for frightening her. She buys the ranch of a Mexican desperado and needs Gene to run it for her, but he has gone with a gang of Mexicans and is too drunk to be appealed to by anyone but Majesty. She finally persuades him to return. He has advised Bonita (Boardman) to take refuge in the crags when she is about to be accused of the murder of a man who fought for her. Majesty does not understand the relationship between Gene and Bonita. When the desperado Don Carlos attacks the ranch, Gene saves Majesty from the Mexicans. Majesty sees Gene talking to Bonita and becomes jealous. Gene is taken captive by Don Carlos and is condemned to death. When Majesty decides to return to the east, the old priest reproaches her for her behavior. Filled with regret over her feelings, Majesty gets a reprieve for Gene and a warrant for Carlos, and saves Gene from death just in time.

== Cast ==
- Dustin Farnum as Gene Stewart
- Winifred Kingston as Majesty Hammond
- Bert Appling as Sheriff Hawes
- Josef Swickard as Padre Marcos
- Virginia True Boardman as Bonita
- Charley Rogers as Danny Marns (billed as Charles Rogers)
- Jeanne Maddock as Florence Kingsley
- George Field as Don Carlos (billed as George Fields)
- Frank Clark as Bill Stillwell
- Edward Hearn as Al Hammond (billed as Eddie Hearn)
- Ogden Crane as Nels
- Lon Poff as Monta Price
- George Cummings as Nick Steele
- Sam Appel as Gomez
- Frank Campeau (Undetermined Role)

== See also ==
- The Light of Western Stars (1925)
- The Light of Western Stars (1930)
- The Light of Western Stars (1940)
