= Viola Roseboro' =

American editor

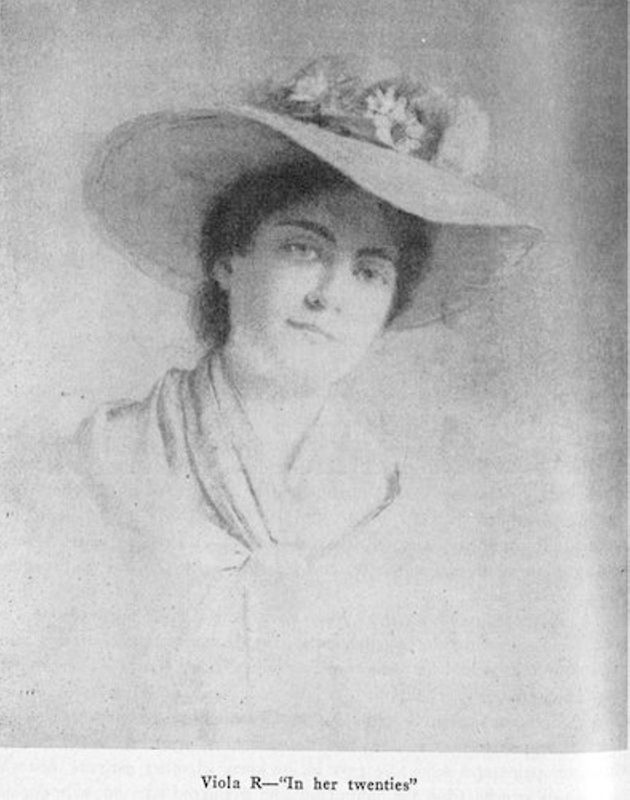
- Roseboro' in her twenties
- Born: December 3, 1857; Pulaski, Tennessee, U.S.
- Died: January 29, 1945 (aged 87); Huguenot, Staten Island
- Occupations: Actress; Journalist; Fiction editor
- Organizations: McClure's; Collier's

Viola Roseboro' (Note: Roseboro' "fiercely defended" the "odd apostrophe at the end of her name".) (December 3, 1857 — January 29, 1945) was an American literary editor. She was the fiction editor for McClure's and later for Collier's, in which role she discovered several important authors. Ida Tarbell called her a "born reader" and a "reader of real genius".

== Early life ==
Roseboro' was born in Pulaski, Tennessee, in 1857. Her parents, the Reverend Samuel Reed Roseboro' (Note: One source states that Viola Roseboro' added the apostrophe to her name as an adult, and that at other times in her life she had used the spellings "Roseborough" and "Rosborough"; other sources, however, indicate that her father used the apostrophe as well.) and Martha Colyar, were abolitionists, and the family was soon forced to flee to Mattoon, Illinois, where Roseboro' lived for the duration of the American Civil War. Her uncle was Tennessee publisher and politician Arthur St. Clair Colyar.

She graduated from the Fairmount School in Monteagle, Tennessee, and, under the name Viola Roseborough, briefly pursued a theatrical career with the Shook and Collier Company. She moved to New York City in 1882 and continued performing; however, in 1887 she was forced to retire after she developed pneumonia.

== Literary career ==
Roseboro' began her literary career with a weekly arts column in The Nashville Daily American. By 1887, her writing was being published in The Century Magazine, The Cosmopolitan, and The Daily Graphic; this brought her in contact with S. S. McClure, who hired her as a reader for the McClure Syndicate, and, subsequently, for McClure's Magazine.

At McClure's, her subordinates included Sonya Levien, who she is credited with having "mentored", Willa Cather (who Roseboro' may have hired, or caused to be hired) and Witter Bynner, whose first poems were published in McClure's with her approval; Bynner subsequently described his job as delivering manuscripts from the editorial office to Roseboro's apartment.

When McClure lost control of the magazine in 1911, Roseboro' left her position there, and by 1913 had joined the staff of Collier's. After her position at Collier's ended, she became a freelance editorial consultant, and briefly worked again at McClure's after McClure regained control in 1921.

Her discoveries included Jack London, Booth Tarkington (whose The Gentleman from Indiana she described as having been "sent by God Almighty"), and William Sidney Porter, from whom she bought the first story under the pseudonym "O. Henry".

== Influence on Cather ==
Willa Cather described Roseboro' as "one of my earliest critics, who was brave enough to tell me that I was certainly going wrong when I tried to write about things of which I had only the most superficial knowledge." Her letters show that she and Roseboro' were friends for decades, with the earliest collected correspondence between the two being dated 1903 and the last being dated 1944. Roseboro' facilitated the 1905 publication of Cather's The Troll Garden,, and Cather sent Roseboro' an advance copy of her 1940 Sapphira and the Slave Girl to get the opinion of a Southerner.

Roseboro' has been popularly credited with having shaped Cather's 1918 novel My Ántonia after it had been rejected by publishers, by suggesting that Cather rewrite it from Jim Burden's viewpoint; however, a 2026 essay in the Willa Cather Review shows that this could not have happened, for multiple reasons, including that Houghton-Mifflin purchased the novel from Cather sight unseen. Literary scholar Scott Reynolds traced the misinformation to an anecdote told by George Madden Martin, which was repeated in Jane Kirkland Graham's 1955 biography of Roseboro', Viola, The Duchess of New Dorp. He further showed that the circumstances described in Martin's anecdote (i.e., Roseboro' advising an author to rewrite a novel which publishers had rejected, so that it was told from a different character's viewpoint, with the result that the novel became a success) were applicable to Margaret Culkin Banning's unpublished Barbara Lives (whose revised version became the 1920 This Marrying), and suggested that Martin conflated the two novels.

Literary scholar Merrill Skaggs identified Roseboro' as Willa Cather's probable inspiration for Myra Henshawe, protagonist of Cather's 1926 novel My Mortal Enemy, and posited that although Cather said the inspiration for Henshawe had died in 1911, this was a reference to Roseboro' having left McClure's in that year. Similarly, literary scholar Elizabeth Ammons has speculated that Roseboro's 1907 short story "The Mistaken Man" "provided the spark for" Cather's 1912 novel Alexander's Bridge.

== Writing ==
Roseboro' continued writing her own fiction even after becoming an editor, including the novels The Joyous Heart (1903) and Storms of Youth (1920), and the short story collections Old Ways and New (1892) and Players and Vagabonds (1904).
