= The Corsican Brothers (1920 film) =

1920 film by Colin Campbell

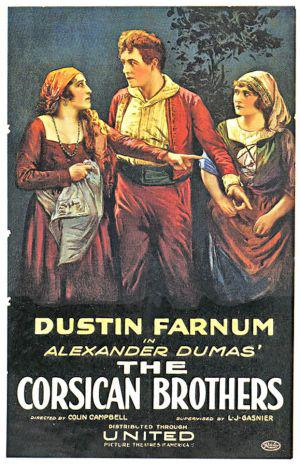
- Lobby card
- Directed by: Colin Campbell
- Written by: Catherine Carr
- Based on: The Corsican Brothers by Alexandre Dumas
- Produced by: Louis J. Gasnier
- Starring: Dustin Farnum; Winifred Kingston; Wedgwood Nowell
- Cinematography: Dal Clawson
- Production company: United Picture Theatres of America
- Distributed by: United Picture Theatres of America
- Release date: February 22, 1920
- Running time: 60 minutes
- Country: United States
- Language: Silent (English intertitles)

The Corsican Brothers is a 1920 American silent historical adventure film directed by Colin Campbell and starring Dustin Farnum, Winifred Kingston, and Wedgwood Nowell. It is an adaptation of the novel The Corsican Brothers by Alexandre Dumas.

== Cast ==
- Dustin Farnum as Louis de Franchi / Fabiel de Franchi
- Winifred Kingston as Emile de Lesparre
- Wedgwood Nowell as Chateau Renaud
- Will Machin as Le Baron Montigiron
- Ogden Crane as Gaeno Orlando
- Fanny Midgley as Madame Savilia Dei Franchi
- Andrew Robson as General de Lesparre

== Bibliography ==
- Donald W. McCaffrey & Christopher P. Jacobs. Guide to the Silent Years of American Cinema. Greenwood Publishing, 1999. ISBN 0-313-30345-2
