= The Love Route =

1915 film

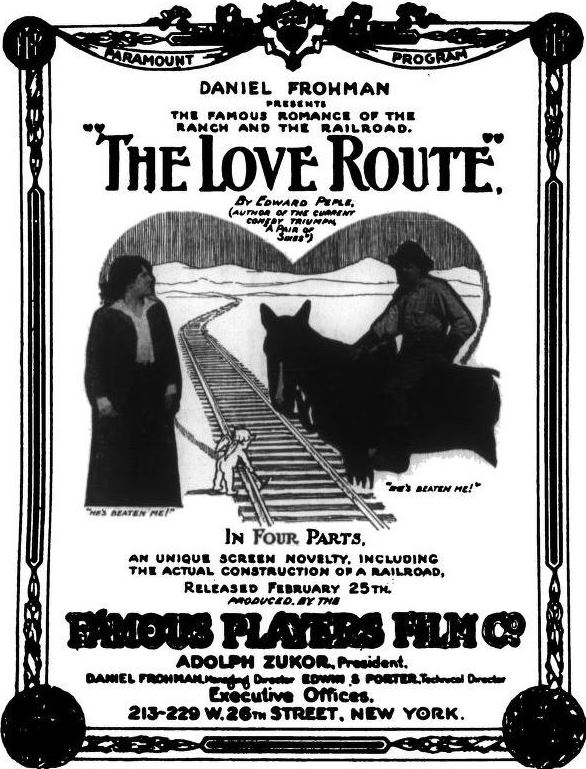
- Advertisement
- Directed by: Allan Dwan
- Written by: Allan Dwan
- Based on: The Love Route by Edward Peple
- Produced by: Daniel Frohman
- Starring: Harold Lockwood; Winifred Kingston; Donald Crisp; Jack Pickford; Dick La Reno; Juanita Hansen
- Production company: Famous Players Film Company
- Distributed by: Paramount Pictures
- Release date: February 25, 1915
- Running time: 4 reels
- Country: United States
- Languages: Silent; English intertitles

The Love Route is a 1915 American silent Western film directed and written by Allan Dwan based upon a play by Edward Peple. The film stars Harold Lockwood, Winifred Kingston, Donald Crisp, Jack Pickford, Dick La Reno, and Juanita Hansen. The film was released on February 25, 1915, by Paramount Pictures.

== Cast ==
- Harold Lockwood as John Ashby
- Winifred Kingston as Allene Houston
- Donald Crisp as Harry Marshall
- Jack Pickford as Billy Ball
- Dick La Reno as Col. Houston
- Juanita Hansen as Lilly Belle
- Marshall Neilan
