= Ben Blair (film) =

1916 film by William Desmond Taylor

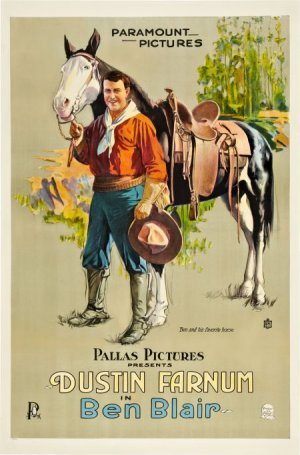
- Theatrical release poster
- Directed by: William Desmond Taylor
- Screenplay by: Julia Crawford Ivers; William Otis Lillibridge
- Starring: Dustin Farnum; Winifred Kingston; Herbert Standing; Lamar Johnstone; Virginia Foltz; Frank A. Bonn
- Production company: Pallas Pictures
- Distributed by: Paramount Pictures
- Release date: March 9, 1916
- Running time: 50 minutes
- Country: United States
- Language: English

Ben Blair is a 1916 American drama silent film directed by William Desmond Taylor and written by Julia Crawford Ivers and William Otis Lillibridge. The film stars Dustin Farnum, Winifred Kingston, Herbert Standing, Lamar Johnstone, Virginia Foltz and Frank A. Bonn. The film was released on March 9, 1916, by Paramount Pictures.

== Plot ==
Ben Blair (1916)

== Cast ==
- Dustin Farnum as Ben Blair
- Winifred Kingston as Florence Winthrop
- Herbert Standing as James Winthrop
- Lamar Johnstone as Scott Winthrop
- Virginia Foltz as Mrs. Scott Winthrop
- Frank A. Bonn as John Rankin
- Fred Burns as Tom Blair
- Gordon Griffith as Ben Blair, as a child

== Preservation ==
- This film survives in the Library of Congress collection.
