= Cameo Kirby (1923 film) =

1923 film directed by John Ford

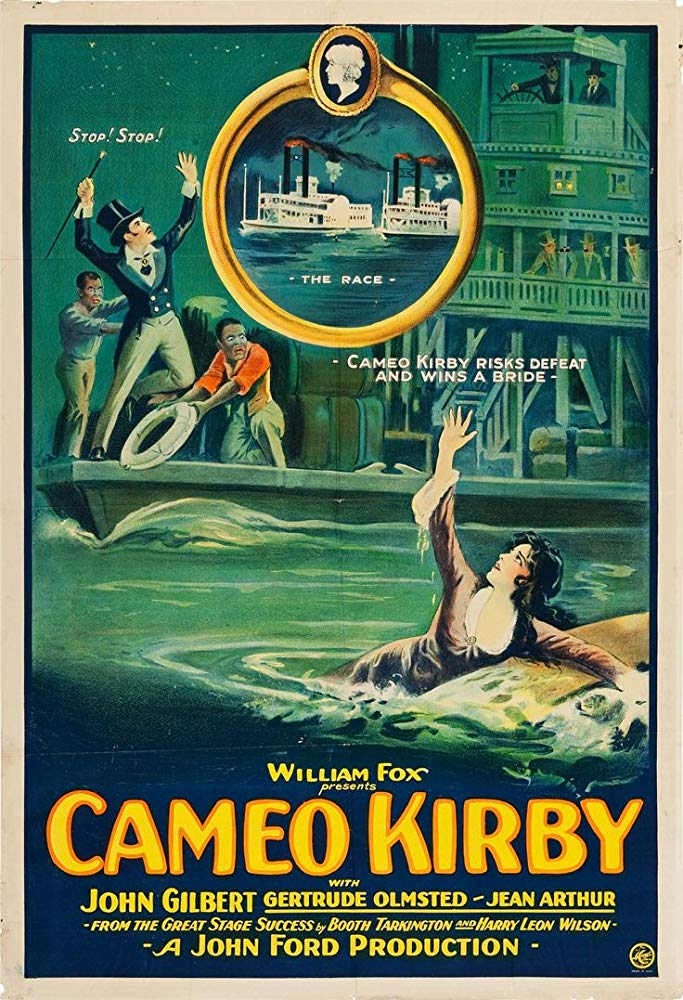
- Film poster
- Directed by: John Ford
- Written by: Robert N. Lee
- Based on: Cameo Kirby (play) by Booth Tarkington and Harry Leon Wilson
- Produced by: William Fox
- Starring: John Gilbert; Gertrude Olmstead
- Cinematography: George Schneiderman
- Production company: Fox Film Corporation
- Distributed by: Fox Film Corporation
- Release date: October 21, 1923 (USA)
- Running time: 70 minutes
- Country: United States
- Language: Silent (English intertitles)

Cameo Kirby is a 1923 American silent drama film directed by John Ford which starred John Gilbert and Gertrude Olmstead and featured Jean Arthur in her onscreen debut. It was Ford's first film credited as John Ford instead of Jack Ford. The film is based on a 1908 play by Booth Tarkington and Harry Leon Wilson. The story had been filmed as a silent before in 1914 with Dustin Farnum, who had originated the role on Broadway in 1909. The film was remade as a talking musical film in 1930.

== Plot ==
Cameo Kirby (1923)

== Cast ==
- John Gilbert as Cameo Kirby
- Gertrude Olmstead as Adele Randall
- Alan Hale as Colonel Moreau
- Eric Mayne as Colonel Randall
- W. E. Lawrence as Tom Randall (as William E. Lawrence)
- Richard Tucker as Cousin Aaron Randall
- Phillips Smalley as Judge Playdell
- Jack McDonald as Larkin Bunce
- Jean Arthur as Ann Playdell
- Eugenie Forde as Madame Davezac
- Frank Baker (uncredited)
- Ken Maynard (uncredited)
- George Reed as Croup (uncredited)
- Ynez Seabury (uncredited)

== Preservation ==
Prints of Cameo Kirby are maintained in the UCLA Film and Television Archive and at the Cinemateca Portuguesa (Portuguese Film Archive), in Lisbon.
