= The Call of the Cumberlands =

1916 film by Frank Lloyd

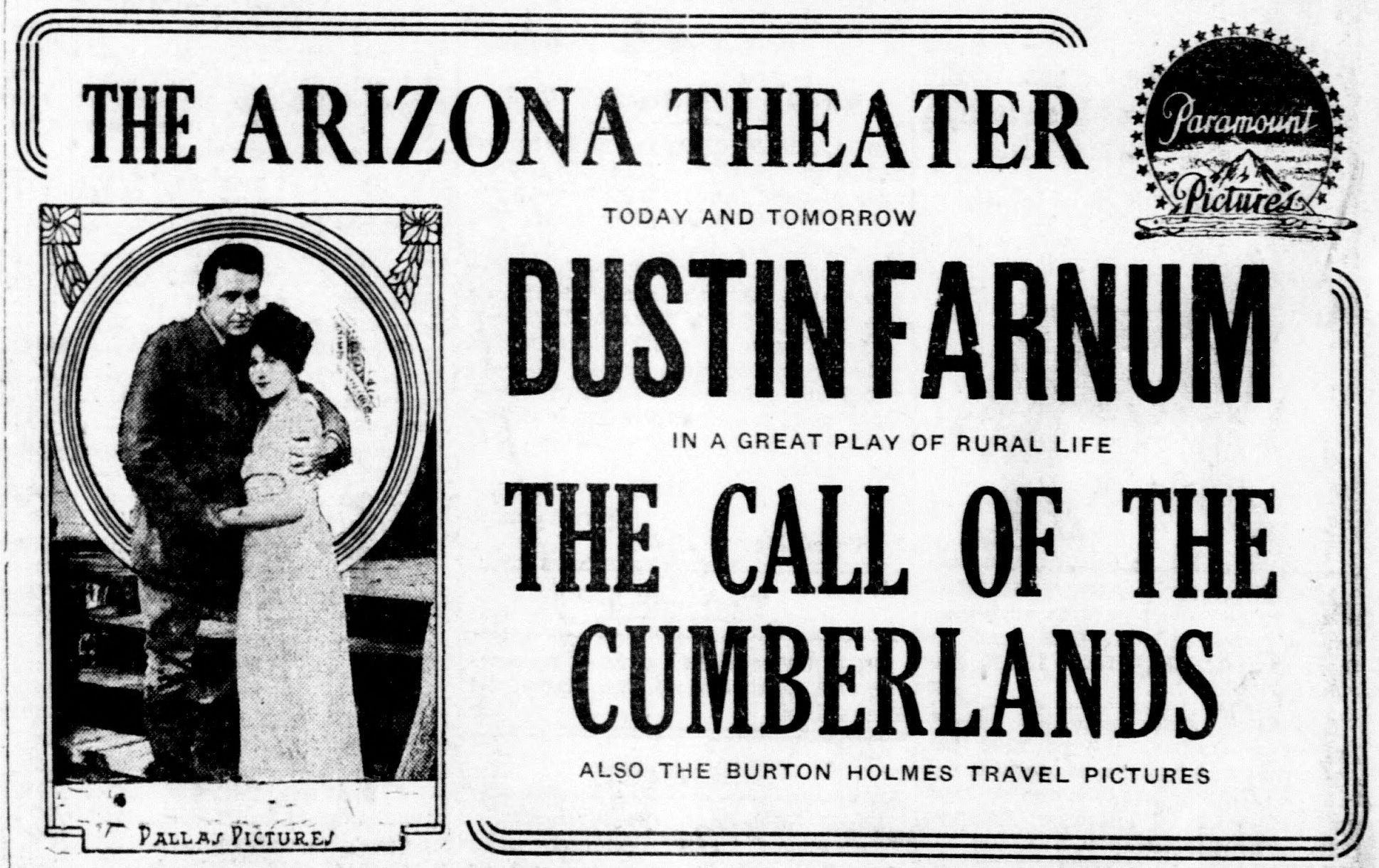
- Newspaper advertisement.
- Directed by: Frank Lloyd
- Screenplay by: Julia Crawford Ivers
- Based on: The Call of the Cumberlands by Charles Neville Buck
- Starring: Dustin Farnum; Winifred Kingston; Herbert Standing; Page Peters; Howard Davies; Richard L'Estrange
- Cinematography: Dal Clawson
- Production company: Pallas Pictures
- Distributed by: Paramount Pictures
- Release date: January 23, 1916
- Running time: 50 minutes
- Country: United States
- Language: Silent (English intertitles)

The Call of the Cumberlands is a 1916 American silent drama film directed by Frank Lloyd and written by Julia Crawford Ivers based upon the novel of the same name by Charles Neville Buck. The film stars Dustin Farnum, Winifred Kingston, Herbert Standing, Page Peters, Howard Davies, and Richard L'Estrange. The film was released on January 23, 1916, by Paramount Pictures.

Full movie

== Plot ==
The story is about a family feud in the mountains of Kentucky.

== Cast ==
- Dustin Farnum as Samson South
- Winifred Kingston as Sally Spicer
- Herbert Standing as Spicer South
- Page Peters as Wilfred Horton
- Howard Davies as James Farbish
- Richard L'Estrange as Tamarack Spicer
- Joe Ray as Aaron Hollis
- Myrtle Stedman as Adrienne Lescott
- Virginia Foltz as Mrs. Lescott
- Michael Hallvard as George Lescott

== Preservation status ==
A print is preserved in the Library of Congress collection.
