= Trail of the Axe =

1922 silent drama film

- Directed by: Ernest C. Warde
- Written by: Ridgwell Cullum
- Produced by: Dustin Farnum
- Starring: Dustin Farnum; Winifred Kingston; Joseph J. Dowling
- Cinematography: Robert Newhard
- Production company: Dustin Farnum Productions
- Distributed by: American Releasing Corporation
- Release date: August 21, 1922
- Running time: 54 minutes
- Country: United States
- Languages: Silent; English intertitles

Trail of the Axe is a 1922 American silent drama film directed by Ernest C. Warde and starring Dustin Farnum, Winifred Kingston and Joseph J. Dowling.

== Cast ==
- Dustin Farnum as Dave Malkern
- Winifred Kingston as Betty Somers
- George Fisher as Jim Malkern
- Joseph J. Dowling as Dr. Somers

== Preservation ==
In February 2021, Trail of the Axe was cited by the National Film Preservation Board on their Lost U.S. Silent Feature Films list and is therefore presumed lost.

== Bibliography ==
- Connelly, Robert B. The Silents: Silent Feature Films, 1910-36, Volume 40, Issue 2. December Press, 1998.
- Munden, Kenneth White. The American Film Institute Catalog of Motion Pictures Produced in the United States, Part 1. University of California Press, 1997.
