= A Sporting Chance (1919 Paramount film) =

1919 film by George Melford

- Directed by: George Melford
- Screenplay by: Will M. Ritchey
- Based on: "Impulses" by Roger Hartman
- Produced by: Jesse L. Lasky
- Starring: Ethel Clayton; Jack Holt; Herbert Standing; Anna Q. Nilsson; Howard Davies
- Cinematography: Paul P. Perry
- Production company: Famous Players–Lasky Corporation
- Distributed by: Paramount Pictures
- Release date: July 13, 1919
- Running time: 50 minutes
- Country: United States
- Language: Silent (English intertitles)

A Sporting Chance is a lost 1919 American silent comedy film directed by George Melford and written by Will M. Ritchey based upon a story by Roger Hartman. The film stars Ethel Clayton, Jack Holt, Herbert Standing, Anna Q. Nilsson, and Howard Davies. The film was released on July 13, 1919, by Paramount Pictures.

A competing film with the title A Sporting Chance directed by Henry King opened a few days earlier.

== Plot ==
As described in a film magazine, Carey Brent, berated by her father Peter Brent for yielding to impulses that lead to minor disasters, disobeys him in deciding to employ an escaping convict Paul Sayre as a chauffeur, thus aiding him in eluding officers. In this capacity he keeps careful watch over her as she seeks to rid her stepmother of what she believes to be the dangerous attentions of Ralph Seward, who is seemingly favored by that lady. Wishing to spare her father pain, she wins the man over from Mrs. Brent, only to eventually discover that he is a blackmailer seeking to dispose of innocent though incriminating letters written by her stepmother when a young and romantic girl. Carey goes to his apartments in his absence to find the letters, but Seward's arrival traps her. At the critical moment the convict-chauffeur breaks in, whips Seward, recovers the letters, and effects Carey's escape. When he arrives home later, Carey warns him of a bulletin she has seen announcing the capture of himself. It turns out that he is a salesman whom the convict had forced to exchange clothes with him. Carey and Paul are married.

== Cast ==
- Ethel Clayton as Carey Brent
- Jack Holt as Paul Sayre
- Herbert Standing as Peter Brent
- Anna Q. Nilsson as Pamela Brent
- Howard Davies as Ralph Seward
