= Vera Lewis =

American actress (1873–1956)

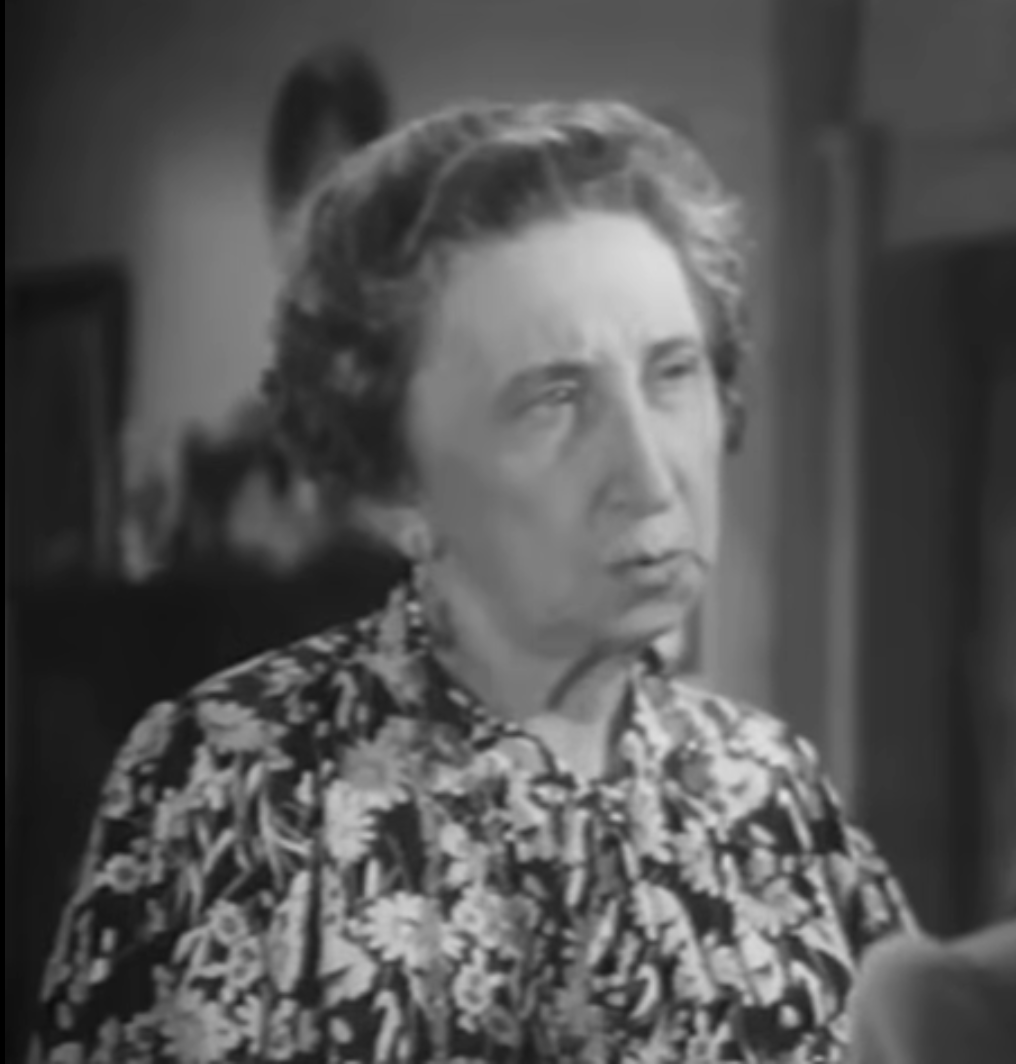
- Lewis in Lady Gangster (1942)
- Born: June 10, 1873; New York, New York, U.S.
- Died: February 8, 1956 (aged 82); Woodland Hills, Los Angeles, U.S.
- Occupation: Actress
- Years active: 1915–1947
- Spouse: Ralph Lewis
- Children: 1

Vera Lewis (June 10, 1873 – February 8, 1956) was an American film and stage actress, beginning in the silent film era. She appeared in more than 180 films from 1915 to 1947. She was married to actor Ralph Lewis.

== Biography ==
She was born in Manhattan, where she began acting in stage productions. Her film career started in 1915 with the film Hypocrites, which starred Myrtle Stedman and Courtenay Foote. From 1915 to 1929, she appeared in 63 silent films, including the film classic Intolerance (1916), where she played the "old maid" Miss Jenkins.

Unlike many silent film stars, she made a smooth transition to sound films, starting with her 1930 appearance in Wide Open, starring Patsy Ruth Miller and Edward Everett Horton. Already age 56 by the time of her first sound film, she appeared in 58 films during the 1930s and another 60 during the 1940s, almost all of them as a character actress. She retired after 1947 and resided at the Motion Picture Country House in Woodland Hills, California at the time of her death on February 8, 1956.

== Family ==
Vera and Ralph Lewis had a daughter, Monica. During her marriage to Fred Johnson, Monica had four children. Thus in addition to her four grandchildren, Vera and Ralph had 10 great-grandchildren.

== Selected filmography ==
- Dot's Elopement (1914, Short) as Dot's Mother
- Hypocrites (1915) as Parishioner (uncredited)
- The Caprices of Kitty (1915) as Miss Smyth
- Sunshine Molly (1915, Short) as Mrs. O'Brien
- Betty in Search of a Thrill (1915) as Mrs. Hastings
- The Kid Magicians (1915, Short) as Georgie's Mother
- Cross Currents (1916) as Mrs. Van de Veer
- The Price of Power (1916) as Pauline Belmont, John's Second Wife
- The Argonauts of California - 1849 (1916)
- Intolerance (1916) as Mary Jenkins
- Married by Accident (1917, Short) as Edna's Maid
- Jack and the Beanstalk (1917) as The Giantess
- Lost in Transit (1917) as Mrs. Flint
- The Trouble Buster (1917) as Mrs. Westfall
- A Weaver of Dreams (1918) as Aunt Hattie Taylor
- A Bit of Jade (1918) as Mrs. Abigail King
- The Vigilantes (1918)
- The Long Lane's Turning (1919) as Charlotte Allen
- As the Sun Went Down (1919) as Ike's Wife
- The Lamb and the Lion (1919) as Mrs. Robert Derby
- The Pest (1919) as Housekeeper
- Yvonne from Paris (1919) as Aunt Marie Provost
- The Mother and the Law (1919) as Miss Mary Jenkins
- The Merry-Go-Round (1919) as Mrs. Pomeroy
- Lombardi, Ltd. (1919) as Mollie
- The Blooming Angel (1920) as Floss's Aunt
- The Devil's Riddle (1920) as Leading lady
- Nurse Marjorie (1920) as Duchess of Donegal
- The Poor Simp (1920) as Mrs. Adams
- A Full House (1920) as Aunt Penelope
- She Couldn't Help It (1920) as Mother Hogan
- Nancy from Nowhere (1922) as Mrs. Kelly
- Peg o' My Heart (1922) as Mrs. Chichester
- The Glorious Fool (1922) as Miss Hart
- Brass (1923) as Mrs. Jones
- Desire (1923) as Mrs. De Witt Harlan
- The Marriage Market (1923) as Aunt Agnes Piggott
- Long Live the King (1923) as Archduchess Annuncita
- Innocence (1923) as Wedding Guest (uncredited)
- How to Educate a Wife (1924) as Mrs. Bancks
- Broadway After Dark (1924) as Mrs. Smith
- Cornered (1924) as Mrs. Wells
- In Every Woman's Life (1924) as Diana Lansdale
- The Dark Swan (1924) as Mrs. Quinn
- Who Cares (1925) as Grandmother Ludlow
- Eve's Secret (1925) as Duchess
- Enticement (1925) as Mrs. Blake
- Stella Dallas (1925) as Mrs. Tibbets
- The Only Thing (1925) as Princess Erek
- The Gilded Butterfly (1926) as Mrs. Ralston
- Ella Cinders (1926) as Ma Cinders
- The Passionate Quest (1926) as Mrs. Gardner
- The Lily (1926) as Mrs. Arnaud Sr
- King of the Pack (1926) as 'Widder' Gasper
- Take It from Me (1926) as Mrs. Forsythe
- The Broken Gate (1927) as Invalid
- Resurrection (1927) as Aunt Marya
- Thumbs Down (1927) as Mrs. Hale
- What Happened to Father? (1927) as Mrs. Bradberry
- The Small Bachelor (1927) as Mrs. Waddington
- Satan and the Woman (1928) as Mrs. Leone Daingerfield
- Something Always Happens (1928) as Gräfin Agathe
- Ramona (1928) as Señora Moreno
- The Home Towners (1928) as Mrs. Calhoun
- The Iron Mask (1929) as Madame Peronne
- Coquette (1929) as Miss Jenkins (uncredited)
- The Drake Case (1929) as 'Miss' Drake (uncredited)
- Wide Open (1930) as Mrs. Hathaway, Agatha's Mother
- Strictly Unconventional (1930) as Duchess of Brocklehurst (uncredited)
- Just Imagine (1930) as 1980 Census Taker (uncredited)
- Command Performance (1931) as Queen Elizabeth
- Night Nurse (1931) as Miss Dillon
- King Kong (1933) as New York Theatergoer (uncredited)
- Hold Your Man (1933) as Mrs. Gargan (uncredited)
- My Lips Betray (1933) as Gossipy Woman in Curlers (uncredited)
- Meet the Baron (1933) as Head Housekeeper (uncredited)
- After Tonight (1933) as Anna Huber, a Cleaner (uncredited)
- The Meanest Gal in Town (1934) as Woman at Mayor's Outing (uncredited)
- Roaring Roads (1935) as Aunt Harriet
- Alias Mary Dow (1935) as Party Guest (uncredited)
- The Daring Young Man (1935) as Secretary to the Duchess (uncredited)
- Man on the Flying Trapeze (1935) as Mrs. Cordelia Neselrode
- Navy Wife (1935) as Bridge Player (uncredited)
- Way Down East (1935) as Mrs. Poole
- Never Too Late (1935) as Mother Hartley
- Paddy O'Day (1936) as Aunt Flora
- Don't Get Personal (1936) as Spinster (uncredited)
- Dancing Pirate (1936) as Orville's Mother (uncredited)
- Missing Girls (1936) as Ma Barton
- Maid of Salem (1937) as Townswoman (uncredited)
- Nothing Sacred (1937) as Miss Sedgewick (uncredited)
- In Old Chicago (1938) as Wedding Witness (uncredited)
- Crime School (1938) as Aunt Liz (uncredited)
- Little Miss Thoroughbred (1938) as Accident Spectator (uncredited)
- Racket Busters (1938) as Jordan's Neighbor (uncredited)
- The Amazing Dr. Clitterhouse (1938) as Juror (uncredited)
- Mr. Chump (1938) as Mrs. Fletcher (uncredited)
- Four Daughters (1938) as Mrs. Ridgefield
- Boy Meets Girl (1938) as Studio Cleaning Woman (uncredited)
- Broadway Musketeers (1938) as Landlady (uncredited)
- The Sisters (1938) as Dowager at Ball (uncredited)
- Girls on Probation (1938) as Miss Lewis, Secretary (uncredited)
- Nancy Drew... Detective (1938) as Miss Van Deering (uncredited)
- Angels with Dirty Faces (1938) as Soapy's Mother (uncredited)
- Comet Over Broadway (1938) as Mrs. Appleton
- Devil's Island (1939) as Gaudet's Housekeeper (uncredited)
- Blackwell's Island (1939) as Hospital Desk Nurse (uncredited)
- Torchy Blane in Chinatown (1939) as Dowager (uncredited)
- Yes, My Darling Daughter (1939) as Mrs. Dibble (uncredited)
- Dodge City (1939) as League Member in Polka-Dot Dress (uncredited)
- On Trial (1939) as Mrs. Leeds, Juror #8
- Women in the Wind (1939) as Farmer's Wife
- Sweepstakes Winner (1939) as Mrs. McCarthy
- Naughty but Nice (1939) as Aunt Annabella Hardwick
- Hell's Kitchen (1939) as Sarah Krispan
- Nancy Drew and the Hidden Staircase (1939) as Miss Rosemary Turnbull
- Espionage Agent (1939) as American Tourist Going to Desert (uncredited)
- Mr. Smith Goes to Washington (1939) as Mrs. Edwards (uncredited)
- The Roaring Twenties (1939) as Mrs. Gray
- Kid Nightingale (1939) as Woman Crashing Vase Over Husband's Head (uncredited)
- The Return of Doctor X (1939) as Miss Sweetman
- Private Detective (1939) as Mrs. Widner
- Four Wives (1939) as Mrs. Ridgefield
- Granny Get Your Gun (1940) as Carrie
- Adventure in Diamonds (1940) as Mrs. MacPherson
- The Courageous Dr. Christian (1940) as Mrs. Norma Stewart
- An Angel from Texas (1940) as Mrs. Gates (uncredited)
- Women in War (1940) as Pierre's Wife (uncredited)
- The Man Who Talked Too Much (1940) as Minor Role (scenes deleted)
- All This, and Heaven Too (1940) as Queen Amélia of France (uncredited)
- They Drive By Night (1940) as Landlady (uncredited)
- Money and the Woman (1940) as Mrs. Leslie, First Bank Depositor (uncredited)
- Calling All Husbands (1940) as Mrs. McGillicuddy (uncredited)
- Always a Bride (1940) as Second Old Maid (scenes deleted)
- Father Is a Prince (1940) as Carrie
- A Night at Earl Carroll's (1940) as Maidy, Wardrobe Woman (uncredited)
- She Couldn't Say No (1940) as Pansy Hawkins
- Four Mothers (1941) as Mrs. Ridgefield
- Honeymoon for Three (1941) as Book Club Member (uncredited)
- Here Comes Happiness (1941) as Mrs. James
- Knockout (1941) as Mrs. Turner (scenes deleted)
- Model Wife (1941) as Mrs. Leahy (uncredited)
- Million Dollar Baby (1941) (scenes deleted)
- Bad Men of Missouri (1941) as Mrs. Jordan (uncredited)
- Manpower (1941) as Wife of the Justice of the Peace (uncredited)
- The Smiling Ghost (1941) as Mrs. Crockett (uncredited)
- Nine Lives Are Not Enough (1941) as Mrs. Slocum
- Passage from Hong Kong (1941) as Tourist (uncredited)
- One Foot in Heaven (1941) as Mrs. Simpson (uncredited)
- Three Girls About Town (1941) as Clubwoman (uncredited)
- Miss Polly (1941) as Elvira Pennywinkle
- They Died with Their Boots On (1941) as Head Nurse (uncredited)
- The Body Disappears (1941) as Mrs. Moggs (uncredited)
- Remember the Day (1941) as Teacher (uncredited)
- Bullet Scars (1942) as Charles' Wife (uncredited)
- Lady Gangster (1942) as Ma Silsby
- Larceny, Inc. (1942) as First Customer (uncredited)
- Moontide (1942) as Mrs. Simpson (uncredited)
- Yankee Doodle Dandy (1942) as Actress (uncredited)
- The Gay Sisters (1942) as Courtroom Visitor with Dog (uncredited)
- Busses Roar (1942) as Mrs. Dipper
- The Hard Way (1943) as Actress as 'Aunt Vera Elliott' in 'Morning Melody' (uncredited)
- The Gorilla Man (1943) as Landlady (uncredited)
- Someone to Remember (1943) as Aggressive Miss Green
- Princess O'Rourke (1943) as Matilda (uncredited)
- Mr. Skeffington (1944) as Wife of Justice of the Peace (uncredited)
- The Suspect (1944) as Hannah Barlow (uncredited)
- The Captain from Köpenick (completed in 1941, released in 1945)
- Hollywood and Vine (1945) as Fanny
- Rhythm Round-Up (1945) as Mrs. Squimp
- Cinderella Jones (1946) as Woman in Courtroom (uncredited)
- The Cat Creeps (1946) as Cora Williams
- Spook Busters (1946) as Mrs. Grimm
- The Killers (1946) as Ma Hirsch (uncredited)
- The Time, the Place and the Girl (1946) as Scrubwoman (uncredited)
- It's a Joke, Son! (1947) as Hortense Dimwitty
- Stallion Road (1947) as Mrs. Pelton, Engagement Party Guest (uncredited)
- It Happened on Fifth Avenue (1947) as Woman in Chauffeured Car (uncredited)
- It Had to Be You (1947) as Mrs. Brown (scenes deleted)
