= Anne Shymer =

American chemist

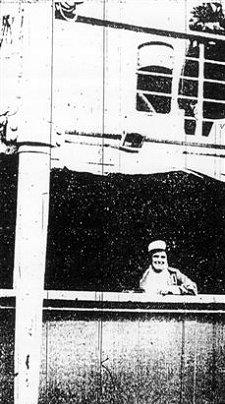
Anne Shymer, photo taken by family on May 1, 1915

Anne Shymer, born Anne C. Justice (May 30, 1879, in Logansport, Cass County, Indiana – May 7, 1915, in North Atlantic) was an American chemist and the president of the United States Chemical Company.

== Early life ==
Anne C. Justice was born at Logansport, Indiana, the daughter of James Monroe Justice and Grace Heikes Justice (later Grace Justice-Hankins). Her father was a lawyer and politician in Indiana. Her older sister Maibelle Heikes Justice became a novelist and screenwriter.

Shmyer attended Cornell University.

== Career ==
Shymer achieved her biggest success as a chemist and founded the United States Chemical Corporation. Among other things, she discovered a bleach for textiles and a germicidal substance that could be used especially in hospitals. Her achievements brought her recognition and prestige; shortly afterwards, she enjoyed world-wide attention. Shymer received an invitation from Britain's prime minister H. H. Asquith and his wife. In 1915, King George V.'s Physician heard of Shymer's accomplishments and was impressed.

== Death on the Lusitania ==
On May 1, 1915, Shymer boarded the British luxury liner RMS Lusitania, which was supposed to travel from New York to Liverpool, England. She was going to be introduced at St. James to King George V and Queen Mary of England. Apart from that, she also wanted to establish new contacts and patent her newest formulae. Before she departed, she wanted to proceed with the divorce of her husband but was hindered because she didn't know where he currently was. On the day of her departure, her mother, her sister Maibelle Justice and other relatives came to Pier 54 to say good bye. Because the departure took longer than expected, her family took a last picture of Shymer. This picture, in which she is smiling and props her left arm self-confidently on the railing on the B-Deck promenade, is one of the most popular pictures associated with the Lusitania catastrophe.

Six days later, in the early afternoon of May 7, 1915, Lusitania was sunk by a German submarine boat U2 0 with a torpedo. The ship sank within a few minutes and took two-thirds of the passengers and crew with it. Shymer was able to get to her cabin B-98 and take her jewelry, that she wore completely in order to not lose it. What happened to her afterwards is unknown. Her corpse was one of the first found and received the number #66. The jewelry that she wore was worth about US$4000 in 1915. On its way back from Ireland to the American embassy in London, the jewelry vanished and has not been seen since. Shymer's dead body was returned to her family in the United States.

== Personal life ==
Anne Justice married twice. Her first husband was an Englishman named Patterson; she was widowed when he died. Her second short-lived marriage was to Robert Delno Shimer (she preferred a variant spelling of the surname); they married and were separated in 1911. Anne died at sea when the Lusitania was sunk; she was 36 years old. She was traveling with almost $4000 worth of jewelry, which was retrieved but soon lost in transit to the American Embassy in London. Her mother's estate and her sister received some damages from the German government for her lost belongings.

Shymer's husband, as well as her mother and sister, sued the Cunard Line for compensation, because of the loss of their relative. Robert Shimer's lawsuit was dropped because he had been living apart from his wife for four years. Grace and Maibelle Justice's lawsuit was settled in October 1925, more than ten years after the incident. Shymer's mother was already dead at that point in time. Maibelle Heikes Justice got US$7,527.
