= The Spy (1917 American film) =

1917 film by Richard Stanton

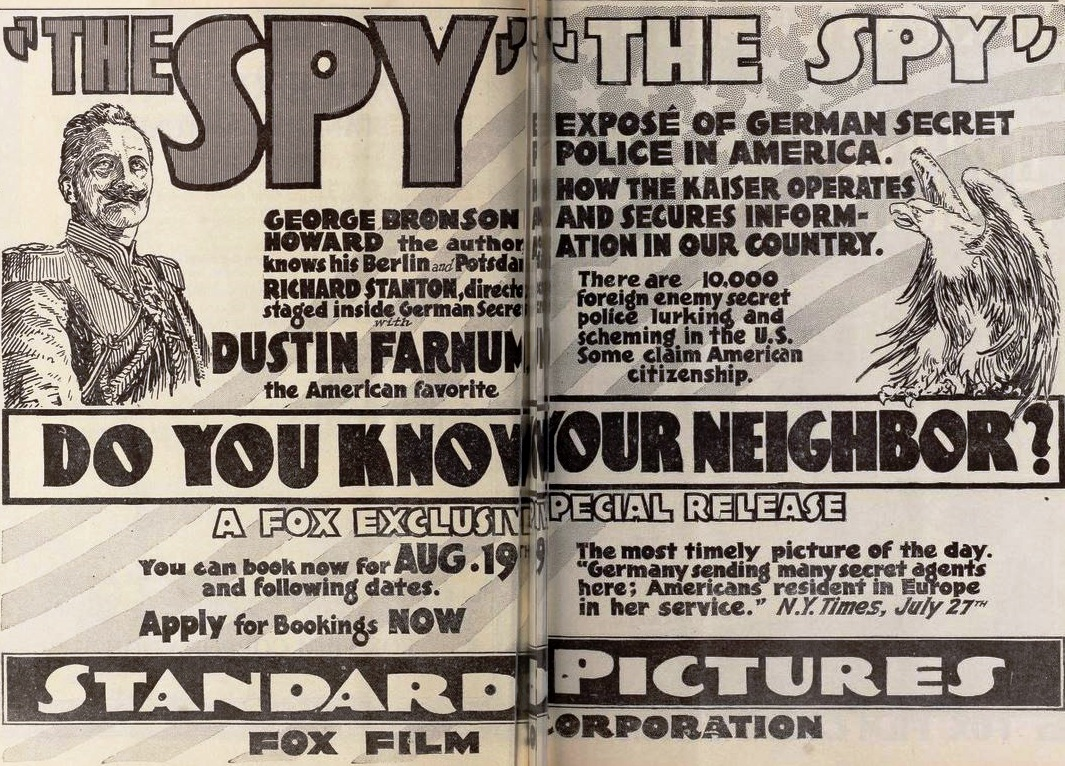
- Directed by: Richard Stanton
- Written by: George Bronson Howard
- Produced by: Richard Stanton; William Fox
- Starring: Dustin Farnum; Winifred Kingston; William Burress
- Cinematography: Devereaux Jennings
- Production company: Standard Pictures
- Distributed by: Fox Film
- Release date: August 17, 1917
- Running time: 80 minutes 60 minutes (edited version)
- Country: United States
- Language: Silent (English intertitles)

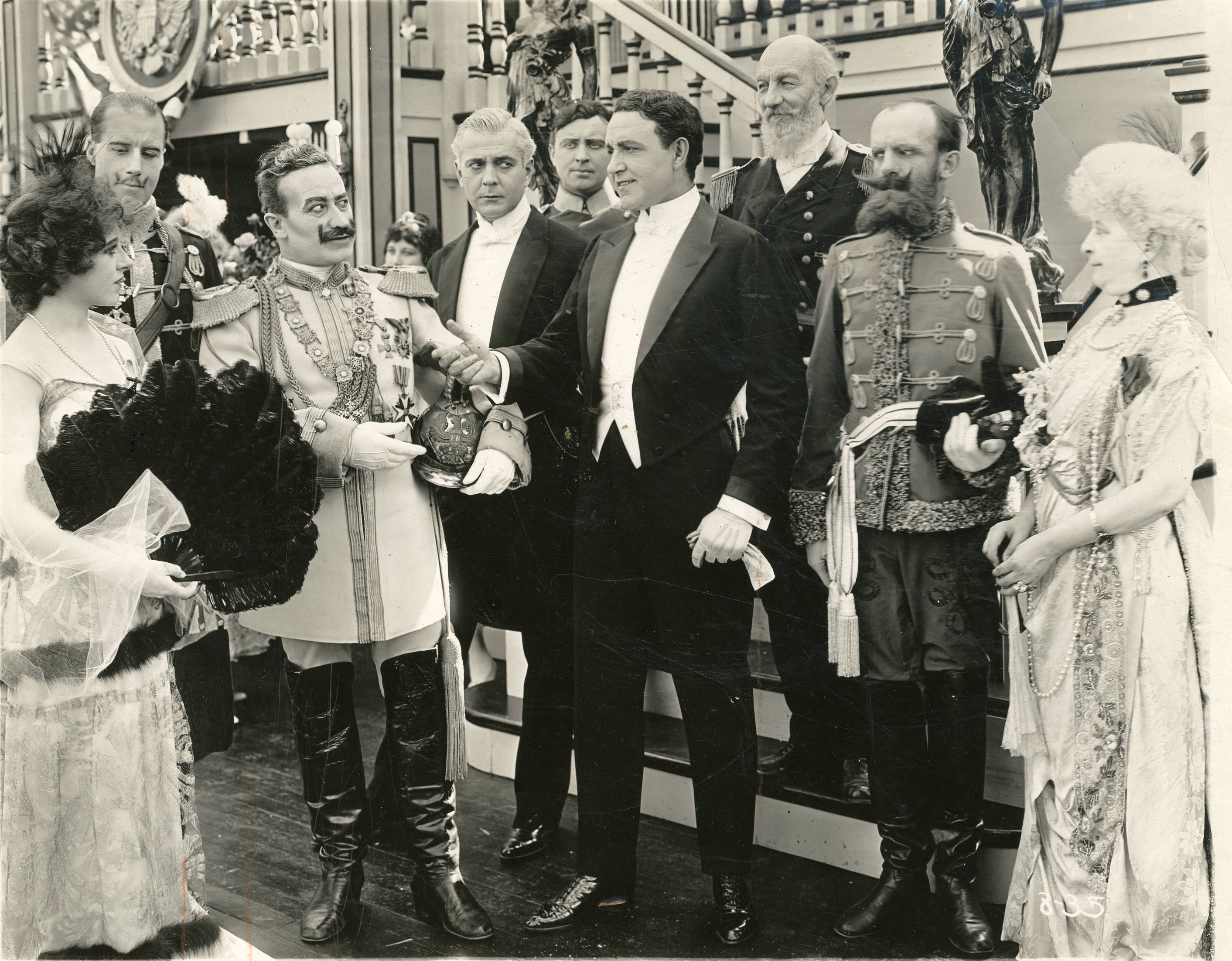
A scene from "The Spy"

The Spy is a 1917 American silent thriller film directed by Richard Stanton and starring Dustin Farnum, Winifred Kingston, and William Burress. It portrays the actions of American spy who travels to Germany during World War I to get hold of a list of German agents active in the United States. He succeeds with the help of a local woman who falls in love with him, but both are captured and executed.

Although the original production ran for 8 reels, it was sometimes reduced to six in certain regions probably due to censorship of some scenes. In Chicago it was banned due to scenes of graphic violence.

== Cast ==
- Dustin Farnum as Mark Quaintance
- Winifred Kingston as Greta Glaum
- William Burress as Freiheer Von Wittzchaeft
- Charles Clary as American Ambassador
- William Lowry as The Shadow
- Howard Gaye as Baron von Bergen

== Bibliography ==
- Solomon, Aubrey. The Fox Film Corporation, 1915-1935: A History and Filmography. McFarland, 2011.
