= Cameo Kirby (1914 film) =

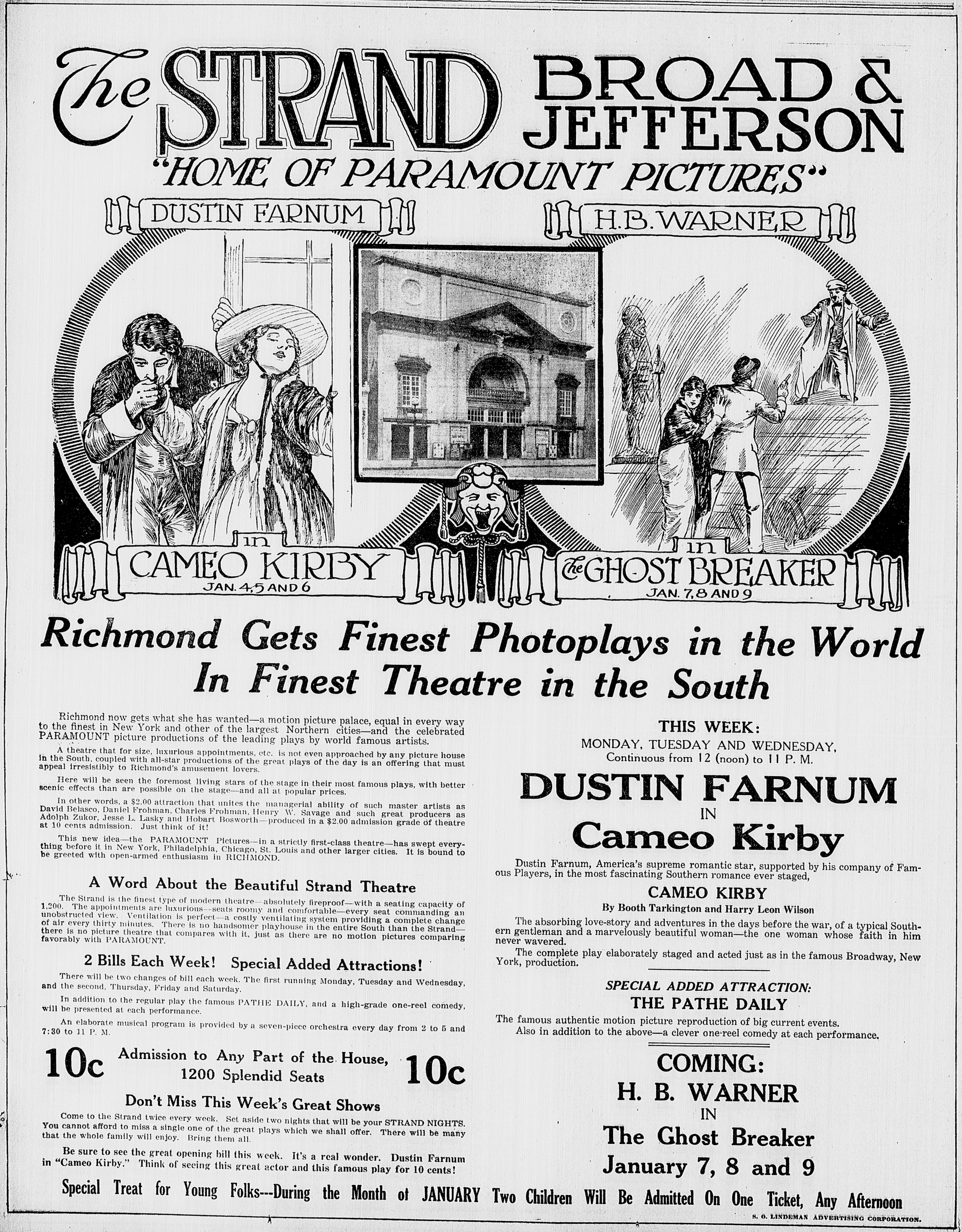
- Contemporary advertisement for Cameo Kirby and The Ghost Breaker
- Directed by: Oscar Apfel
- Screenplay by: Clara Beranger; Booth Tarkington; Harry Leon Wilson; William C. deMille
- Based on: Cameo Kirby by Booth Tarkington; Harry Leon Wilson
- Produced by: Jesse L. Lasky
- Starring: Dustin Farnum; Fred Montague; James Neill; Jode Mullally; Winifred Kingston; Dick La Reno
- Production company: Jesse L. Lasky Feature Play Company
- Distributed by: Paramount Pictures
- Release date: December 24, 1914
- Running time: 50 minutes
- Country: United States
- Language: English

Cameo Kirby is a 1914 American drama silent film directed by Oscar Apfel and written by Clara Beranger and William C. deMille. The film stars Dustin Farnum, Fred Montague, James Neill, Jode Mullally, Winifred Kingston and Dick La Reno. It is based on the play Cameo Kirby by Booth Tarkington and Harry Leon Wilson. The film was released on December 24, 1914, by Paramount Pictures.

== Plot ==
In New Orleans, Gene Kirby, nicknamed Cameo, finds himself financially ruined after his father's death and must auction off the plantation with all the slaves. After the sale, Cameo goes with Randall, an old friend of the family, on a boat that goes up the river hosting a gambling hall. On board, Cameo wins against Colonel Moreau, a professional player; at the same time, Randall, involved in the game, loses all his properties. Unaware that Cameo wants to return his losses, Randall kills himself. Randall's son Tom swears revenge and, when Moreau is killed in a duel against Cameo, he steals the weapon from the dead man's hand, making the duel look like murder. Cameo escapes capture but manages to convince Tom's sister, Adele, with whom Cameo is in love, of his innocence. When the gun is found in Tom's possession, the Randall family recognizes Cameo's innocence, restoring his honor: Cameo, a true southern gentleman, can be entrusted with the fate of the beautiful Adele, making him enter their family.

== Cast ==
- Dustin Farnum as Cameo Kirby
- Fred Montague as Colonel Moreau
- James Neill as John Randall
- Jode Mullally as Tom Randall
- Winifred Kingston as Adele Randall
- Dick La Reno as Larkin Bunce
- Ernest Joy as Aaron Randall

== Preservation ==
With no prints of Cameo Kirby located in any film archives, it is considered a lost film.

== See also ==
- Cameo Kirby (1923)
- Cameo Kirby (1930)
