= Winifred Kingston =

British-born American silent film actress

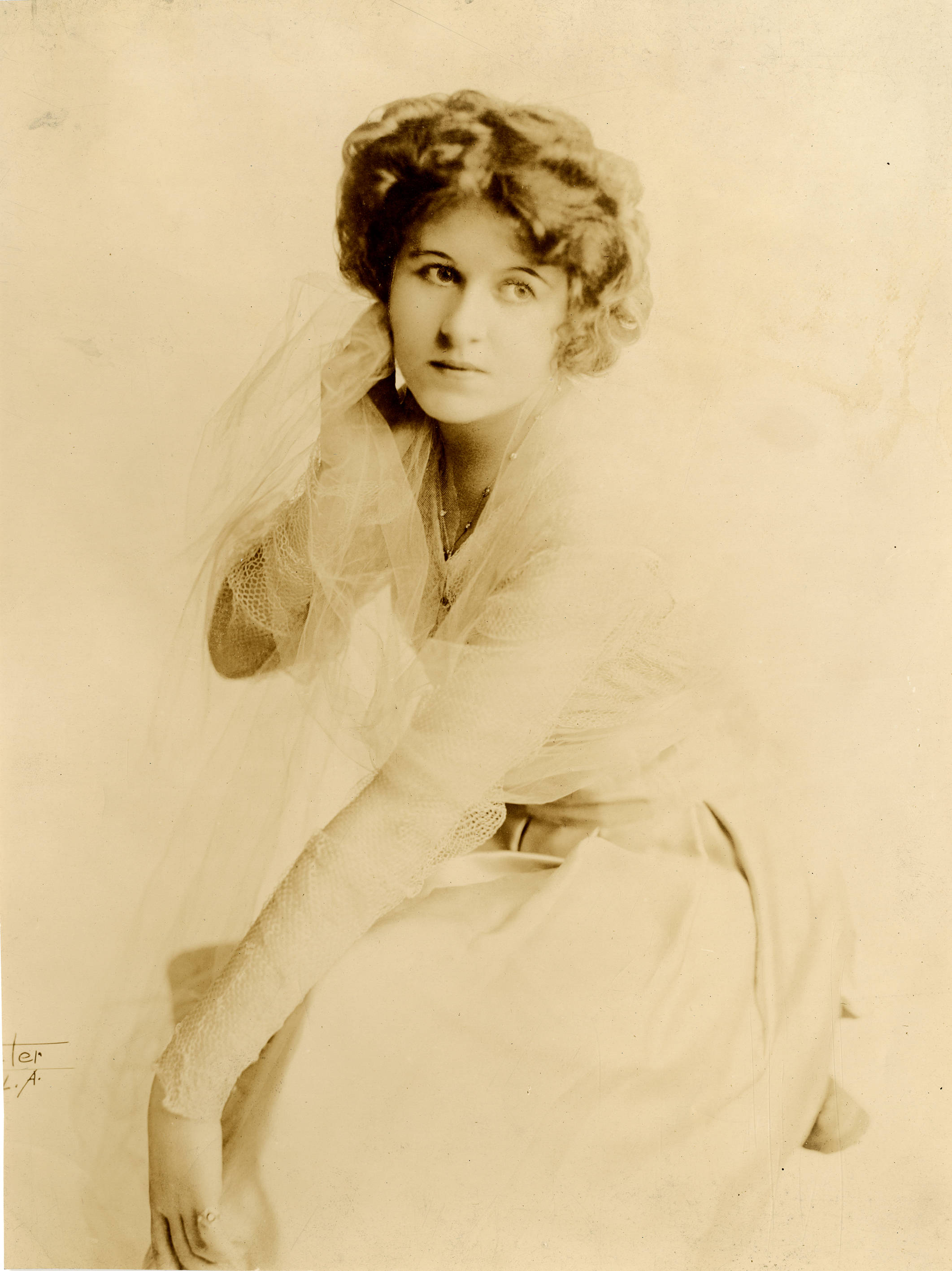
- Kingston in 1919
- Born: 11 November 1894; London, England
- Died: 3 February 1967 (aged 72); La Jolla, California
- Occupation: Actress
- Spouses: Dustin Farnum (1924-1929, his death); Carman R. Runyon
- Children: 1

Winifred Kingston (11 November 1894 – 3 February 1967) was a British-born American silent film actress.

Kingston was educated in Scotland and Belgium. She acted on stage in England before she began acting in the United States.

On Broadway, Kingston portrayed Crobyle in Thais (1911), Juliette Corton in The Matrimonial Bed (1927), and Helen Farquhar in Caste (1927).

She married actor Dustin Farnum on August 24, 1924, in Los Angeles, and they had a daughter, Estelle. Kingston appeared with her husband often onscreen most notably in The Squaw Man and The Virginian. After Farnum's death in 1929, she married oil executive Carman R. Runyon.

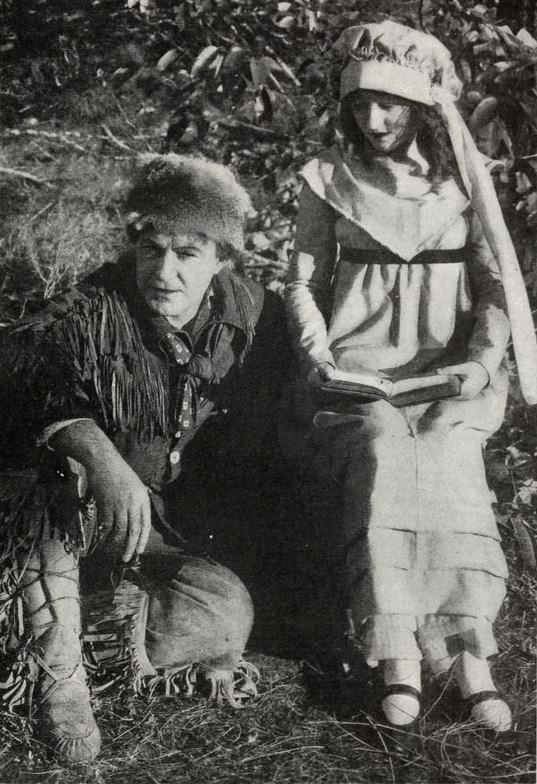
Kingston with husband Dustin in Davy Crockett, 1916.

On February 3, 1967, Kingston died at her home in La Jolla.

== Filmography ==
- Soldiers of Fortune (1914)
- The Squaw Man (1914)
- Brewster's Millions (1914)
- The Call of the North (1914)
- The Virginian (1914)
- Where the Trail Divides (1914)
- Cameo Kirby (1914)
- The Love Route (1915)
- Captain Courtesy (1915)
- The Road to Fame (1915 short)
- The Light on the Reef (1915 short)
- The Seventh Noon (1915)
- The Gentleman from Indiana (1915)
- The Call of the Cumberlands (1916)
- Ben Blair (1916)
- David Garrick (1916)
- Davy Crockett (1916)
- The Parson of Panamint (1916)
- The Intrigue (1916)
- A Son of Erin (1916)
- Durand of the Bad Lands (1917)
- The Spy (1917)
- North of Fifty-Three (1917)
- The Scarlet Pimpernel (1917)
- The Light of Western Stars (1918)
- The Corsican Brothers (1920)
- Beyond (1921)
- Trail of the Axe (1922)
- The Squaw Man (1931) (uncredited)
- The Boy and the Bridge (1959)
