= Maibelle Heikes Justice =

American screenwriter (1871–1926)

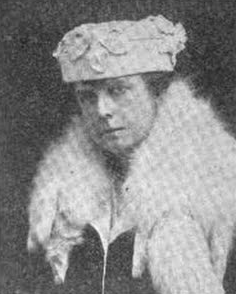
Maibelle Heikes Justice, from a 1916 publication

Maibelle Heikes Justice (1871 — March 11, 1926) was an American novelist and screenwriter.

== Early life ==
Maibelle Heikes Justice was born in Logansport, Indiana, the daughter of James Monroe Justice and Grace E. Heikes Justice (later Grace Justice-Hankins). Her father was a lawyer and politician, and an American Civil War veteran. She was educated in New York City and Philadelphia, and spent two years with the military, for which she was given honorary rank of captain in the U.S. Army.

== Career ==
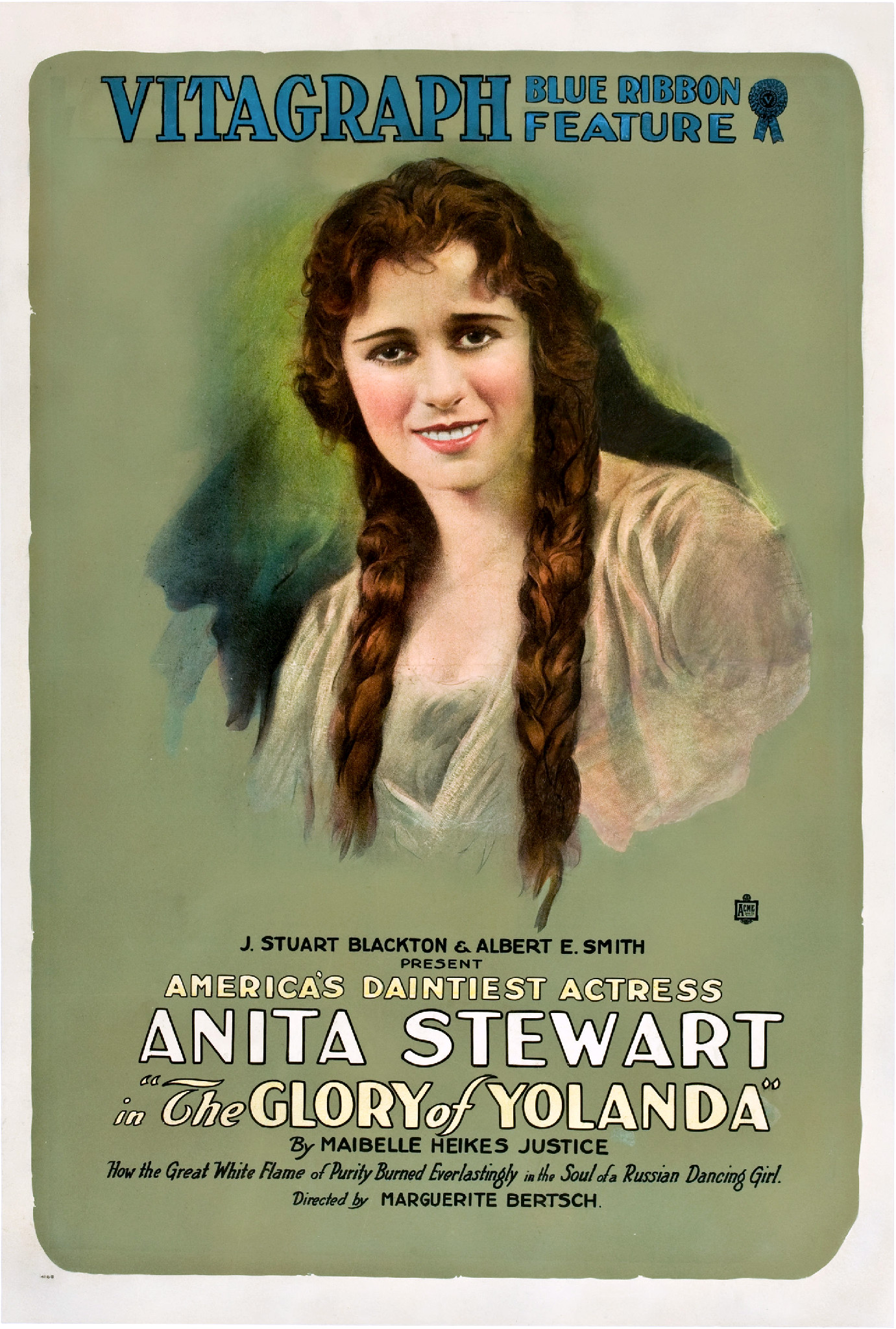
A movie poster for The Glory of Yolanda (1917) crediting Maibelle Heikes Justice under title

Justice was credited as a writer on over 40 silent films between 1913 and 1925, most of them shorts. Among her notable films was The Post-Impressionists (1913; Hardee Kirkland, dir.), a comedy based on her visit to the Armory Show that year. The Song in the Dark (1914) was about a blind canary and her blind owner.

Her Husband's Honor (1918, working title The Gadabout) starred a fellow Logansport native, actress Edna Goodrich. She visited the "death house" at Sing Sing prison to research her screenplay for Who Shall Take My Life? (1917), a drama about the execution of an innocent man. In 1917 she was commissioned to write a movie about the World War I work of the Red Cross.

Justice published fiction in The Cosmopolitan and other national publications. She also wrote a novel, Durand of the Bad Lands, which was adapted for film in 1917, and again in 1925.

== Personal life ==
Her sister Anne Shymer, a chemist and president of the United States Chemical Company, was among the passengers who died in the sinking of the Lusitania in 1915. Maibelle Heikes Justice died in 1926, aged 55 years.

Justice inherited a large portrait of a young Abraham Lincoln, The Railsplitter (1860), from her father. She donated it to the Chicago History Museum, where it remains on display.

== Partial filmography ==
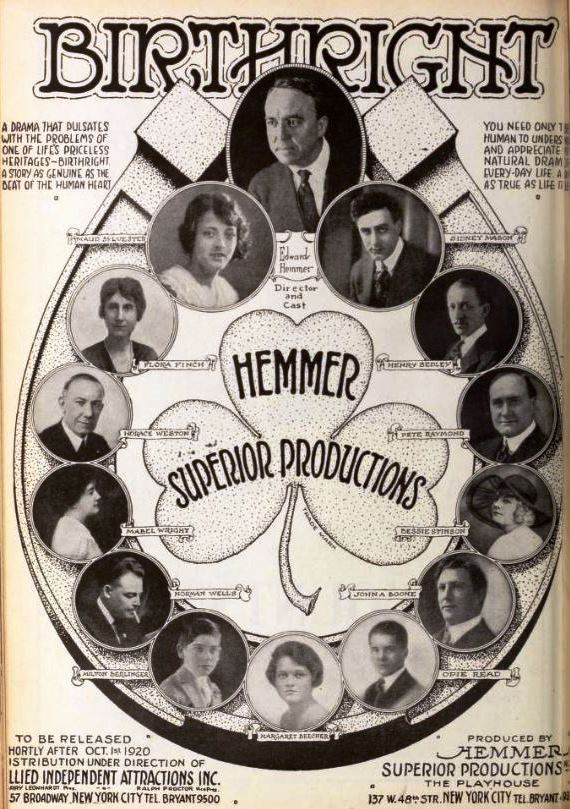
Advertisement for the 1920 film Birthright

- The Post-Impressionists (1913) directed by Hardee Kirkland, a comedy based on her visit to the Armory Show that year
- The Song in the Dark (1914), about a blind canary and her blind owner
- Birthright (1920)
