= Durand of the Bad Lands (1925 film) =

1925 film

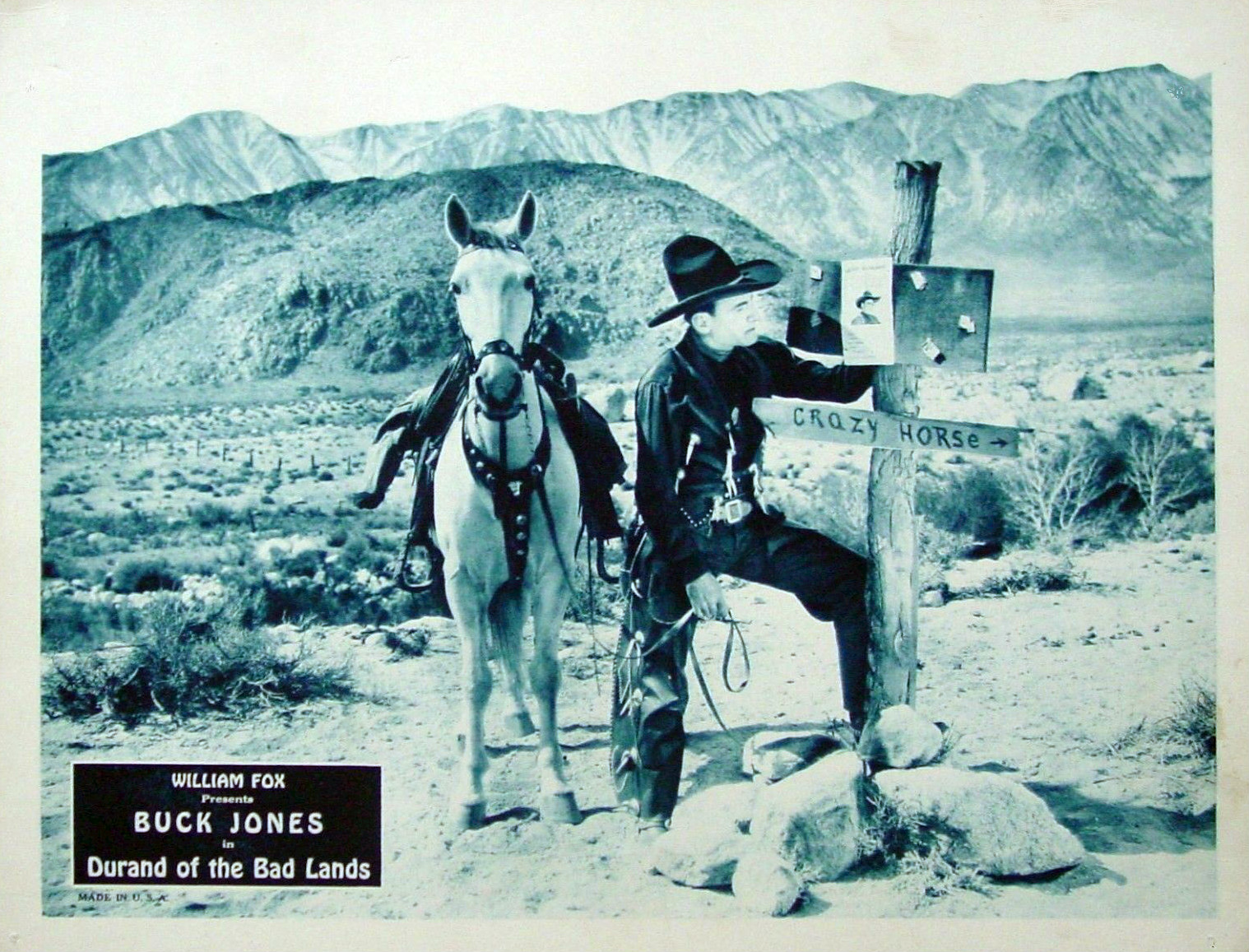
- Lobby card
- Directed by: Lynn Reynolds
- Written by: Maibelle Heikes Justice; Lynn Reynolds
- Starring: Buck Jones; Marian Nixon; Malcolm Waite
- Cinematography: Allen M. Davey
- Production company: Fox Film Corporation
- Distributed by: Fox Film Corporation
- Release date: November 1, 1925
- Running time: 50 minutes
- Country: United States
- Languages: Silent; English intertitles

Durand of the Bad Lands is a lost 1925 American silent Western film directed by Lynn Reynolds and starring Buck Jones, Marian Nixon, and Malcolm Waite. It is a remake of the 1917 film of the same title.

== Plot ==
Pete Garson, a henchman of Sheriff Clem Allison, commits various crimes under the guise of former rancher Dick Durand. The latter, hearing about the situation, returns from Mexico to clear his name. There, Dick meets and falls in love with Molly Gore, who initially spurns his attention. However, after performing a series of good deeds that finally establishes his innocence, her attitude softens and, in the end, she returns his love.

== Cast ==
- Buck Jones as Dick Durand
- Marian Nixon as Molly Gore
- Malcolm Waite as Clem Allison
- Fred DeSilva as Peter Garson
- Luke Cosgrave as Kingdom Come Knapp
- George Lessey as John Boyd
- Buck Black as Jimmie
- Seessel Anne Johnson as Clara Belle
- James Corrigan as Joe Gore
- Carole Lombard as Ellen Boyd
- Jack Curtis as Actor

== Preservation ==
With no prints of Durand of the Bad Lands located in any film archives, it is a lost film.

== See also ==
- 1937 Fox vault fire

== Bibliography ==
- Solomon, Aubrey. The Fox Film Corporation, 1915-1935: A History and Filmography. McFarland, 2011.
