= Durand of the Bad Lands (1917 film) =

1917 film

- Directed by: Richard Stanton
- Written by: Maibelle Heikes Justice
- Starring: Dustin Farnum; Winifred Kingston; Tom Mix
- Cinematography: Devereaux Jennings
- Production company: Fox Film Corporation
- Distributed by: Fox Film Corporation
- Release date: August 12, 1917
- Running time: 50 minutes
- Country: United States
- Languages: Silent; English intertitles

Durand of the Bad Lands is a 1917 American silent Western film directed by Richard Stanton and starring Dustin Farnum, Winifred Kingston and Tom Mix. It was remade in 1925.

== Cast ==
- Dustin Farnum as Dick Durand
- Winifred Kingston as Molly Gore
- Tom Mix as Clem Alison
- Ethylyn Chrisman as May Bond
- Lee Morris as 'Kingdom Come' Knapp
- Amy Jerome as Inez
- Frankie Lee as Jimmy

== Preservation ==
With no holdings located in archives, Durand of the Bad Lands is considered a lost film.

== Bibliography ==
- Connelly, Robert B. (1998). The Silents: Silent Feature Films, 1910-36. December Press. ISBN 978-0-913204-36-8.
- Hoffmann, Henryk (October 16, 2024). "A" Western Filmmakers: A Biographical Dictionary of Writers, Directors, Cinematographers, Composers, Actors and Actresses. McFarland. ISBN 978-1-4766-0864-8.
- Katchmer, George A. (1991). Eighty Silent Film Stars: Biographies and Filmographies of the Obscure to the Well Known. McFarland. ISBN 978-0-89950-494-0.
- Langman, Larry (October 20, 1992). A Guide to Silent Westerns. Bloomsbury Academic. ISBN 978-0-313-27858-7.
- Rainey, Buck (October 18, 2024). The Strong, Silent Type: Over 100 Screen Cowboys, 1903-1930. McFarland. ISBN 978-1-4766-1524-0.
- Solomon, Aubrey. The Fox Film Corporation, 1915-1935: A History and Filmography. McFarland, 2011.
