= Dustin Farnum =

American actor, singer and dancer

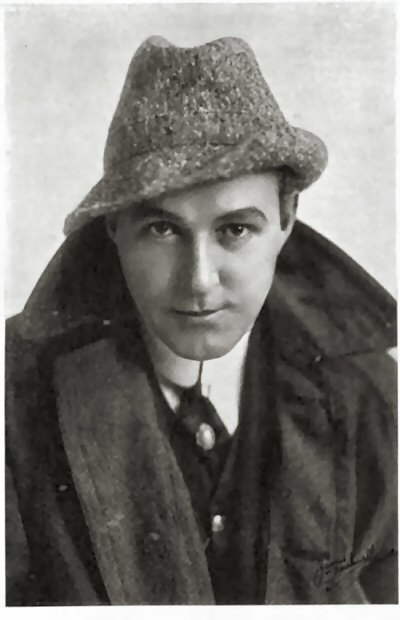
- Farnum in 1914
- Born: Dustin Lancy Farnum; May 27, 1874; Hampton Beach, New Hampshire, U.S.
- Died: July 3, 1929 (aged 55); New York City, U.S.
- Occupations: Silent film actor, singer, vaudeville performer
- Years active: 1914–1926
- Spouses: Mary Cromwell (m. 1909; div. 1924) Winifred Kingston (m. 1924)
- Family: William Farnum (brother); Marshall Farnum (brother)

Dustin Lancy Farnum (May 27, 1874 – July 3, 1929) was an American singer, dancer, and actor on the stage and in silent films. Although he played a wide variety of roles, he tended toward westerns and became one of the bigger stars of the genre. He has been called ""the Clark Gable of the silent screen".

== Early life and education ==
He was born the eldest of three boys on May 27, 1874, in Hampton Beach, New Hampshire, the older brother of actor William Farnum, whom he closely resembled, and the lesser known silent film director Marshall Farnum (died 1917). He married Mary Cromwell in 1909, and they divorced in 1924. He then married Winifred Kingston; they were the parents of radio actress Estelle "Dustine" Runyon (1925–1983).

== Career ==
After great success in a number of stage roles, Farnum landed his first film role in 1914 in the movie Soldiers of Fortune, and later in Cecil B. DeMille's The Squaw Man.

== Death ==
He died of kidney failure on July 3, 1929, at Post Graduate Hospital (now NYU Langone Health) in Manhattan, aged 55.

== Filmography ==
- Soldiers of Fortune (1914)
- The Squaw Man (1914)
- The Lightning Conductor (1914)
- The Virginian (1914)
- When We Were Young (1914)
- Cameo Kirby (1914)
- Captain Courtesy (1915)
- The Iron Strain (1916)
- The Gentleman from Indiana (1916)
- The Call of the Cumberlands (1916)
- Ben Blair (1916)
- David Garrick (1916)
- Davy Crockett (1916)
- The Parson of Panamint (1916)
- The Intrigue (1916)
- A Son of Erin (1916)
- Durand of the Bad Lands (1917)
- The Spy (1917)
- North of Fifty Three (1917)
- The Scarlet Pimpernel (1917)
- Ready Money Ringfield (1918)
- The Light of Western Stars (1918)
- A Man in the Open (1919)
- A Man's Fight (1919)
- The Corsican Brothers (1920)
- Big Happiness (1921)
- The Primal Law (1921)
- The Devil Within (1921)
- Iron to Gold (1922)
- Strange Idols (1922)
- Oath-Bound (1922)
- Trail of the Axe (1922)
- The Yosemite Trail (1922)
- While Justice Waits (1922)
- Three Who Paid (1923)
- The Buster (1923)
- Bucking the Barrier (1923)
- The Man Who Won (1923)
- The Grail (1923)
- Kentucky Days (1923)
- My Man (1924)
- The Flaming Frontier (1926)

== Broadway plays ==
- A Romance of Athlone (January 29, 1900 – March 3, 1900)
- Marcelle (October 1900)
- More Than Queen (October 30, 1900 – November 1900)
- The Virginian (Boston October 1903, New York January 5, 1904 – May 1904)
- The Ranger (September 1907)
- The Rector's Garden (March 1908)
- Cameo Kirby (December 20, 1909 – January 1910)
- The Silent Call (January 1911)
- The Squaw Man (January 9, 1911 – January 17, 1911)
- The Littlest Rebel (November 14, 1911 – January 1912)
- Arizona (April 28, 1913 – June 1913)

== Legacy ==
According to an interview in the April 1975 edition of Playboy, Dustin Hoffman was named after Farnum. Additionally, according to an interview on January 16, 2013, on Fresh Air with Terry Gross on NPR, Hoffman said his parents were expecting him to be a girl and did not have a boy's name ready. When his mother did have another boy, and was pressured to give him a name, she picked the name Dustin from a magazine the other lady in her room was reading, which featured Dustin Farnum on the cover.
