= Merton of the Movies =

Merton of the Movies may refer to:

- Merton of the Movies (novel), a 1922 novel by Harry Leon Wilson
  - Merton of the Movies (play), a 1922 Broadway play by George S. Kaufman and Marc Connelly
  - Merton of the Movies (1924 film), a lost film
  - Merton of the Movies (1947 film), starring Red Skelton

== See also ==
- Make Me a Star (film), a 1932 remake of the 1924 film
- Mary of the Movies, 1923 film using a similar plot
- Polly of the Movies, 1927 film using a similar plot
