= His Majesty, Bunker Bean =

His Majesty, Bunker Bean may refer to:

- His Majesty Bunker Bean, the original 1912 title used in the serialized publication of Harry Leon Wilson's novel Bunker Bean which was later shortened when printed in book form in 1913
- His Majesty Bunker Bean (play), 1915 play by Lee Wilson Dodd based on Wilson's novel
- His Majesty, Bunker Bean (1918 film), an American silent comedy film based on both the novel and play
- His Majesty, Bunker Bean (1925 film), an American silent comedy film based on both the novel and play

== See also ==
- Bunker Bean (film), 1936 film based on both the novel and play
