= Bunker Bean =

1912 novel by Harry Leon Wilson

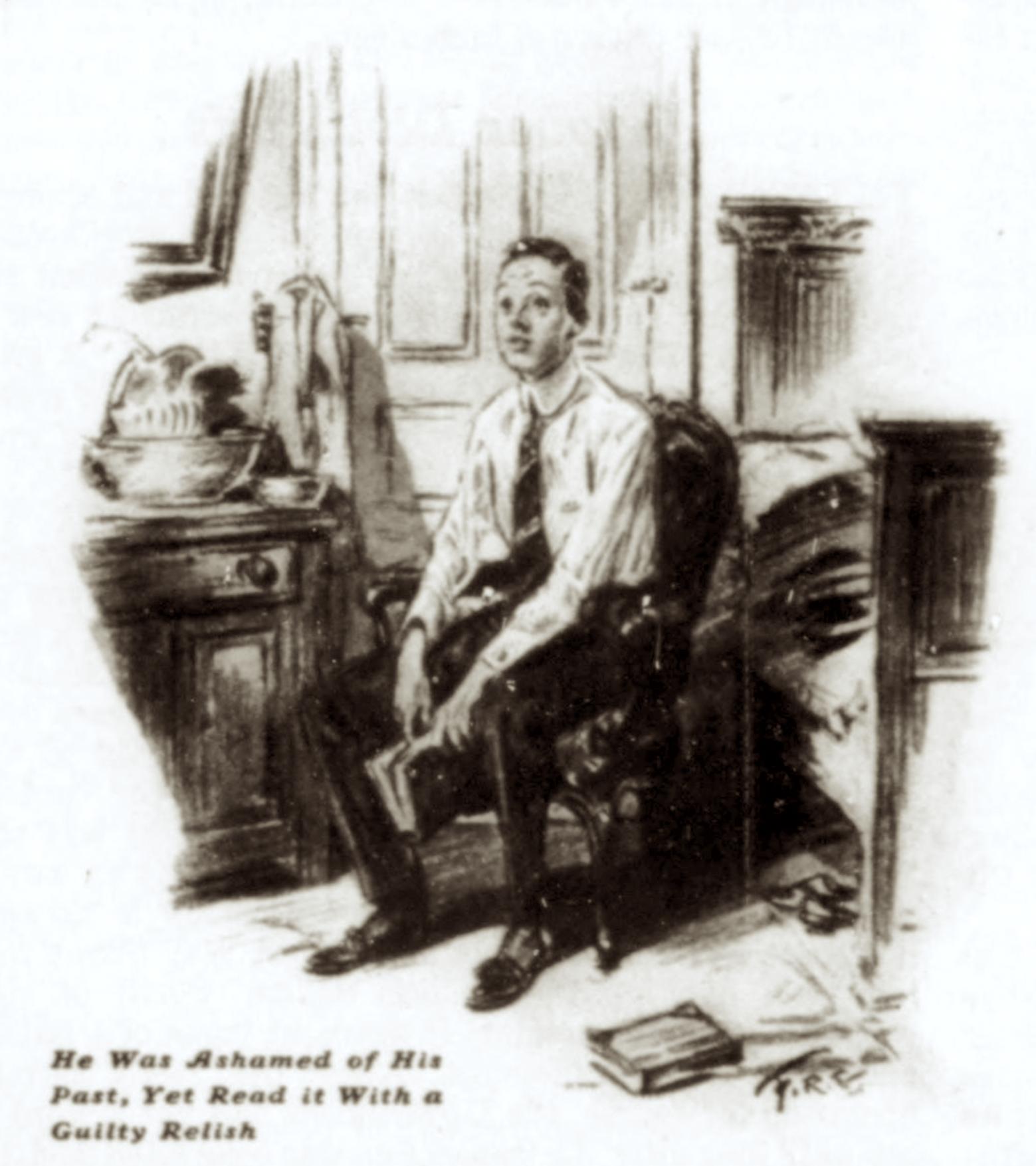
Illustration of Bunker Bean by Frederic Rodrigo Gruger from the October 12, 1912 issue of The Saturday Evening Post.

Bunker Bean is a novel by Harry Leon Wilson. It was originally published as a serial under the title His Majesty Bunker Bean in The Saturday Evening Post beginning in the October 12, 1912 publication and ending in the December 14, 1912 edition. The nine issues were illustrated by Frederic Rodrigo Gruger. Well received, it was published in book form in January 1913 by Doubleday under the title Bunker Bean. The novel included one of the earliest representations of the "flapper" in literature; although many of the later stylized associations with that term such as bobbed hair and hip flasks did not emerge until later in the 1920s.

== Plot ==
The story depicts shy and shrinking stenographer Bunker Bean escaping from the troubled reality around him through his dreams. He seeks help from the spiritualist Countess Casanova who convinces him that he is the reincarnation of Napoleon Bonaparte. The news bolsters him into new confidence temporarily only to be deflated when he loses confidence in being able to win the affections of his boss's daughter known as "The Flapper". His faith in himself is renewed once again when he seeks the help of another psychic medium, Professor Balthasar, who discovers that he was a king of Egypt named Ram Tah prior to being Napoleon.

== Adaptations ==
Playwright Lee Wilson Dodd adapted Bunker Bean into a hit stage play, His Majesty Bunker Bean, which starred the actor Taylor Holmes in the title role. It premiered in Detroit on September 27, 1915 at the Garrick Theatre, and then had a six-month run in Chicago at the Cort Theatre. It toured nationally prior to reaching Broadway's Astor Theatre in October 1916. Both the novel and the play were used as the source material for three film adaptations: His Majesty, Bunker Bean (1918), His Majesty, Bunker Bean (1925), and Bunker Bean (1936).
