= Cort Theatre (disambiguation) =

The Cort Theatre may refer to:

- Cort Theatre, the original name of the James Earl Jones Theatre on Broadway in New York City
- Cort Theatre (Chicago), a theatre in Chicago
- Cort Theatre (San Francisco), a theatre in San Francisco
- Cort Theatre, the original name of the Park Square Theatre (Boston)
