= His Majesty, Bunker Bean (1918 film) =

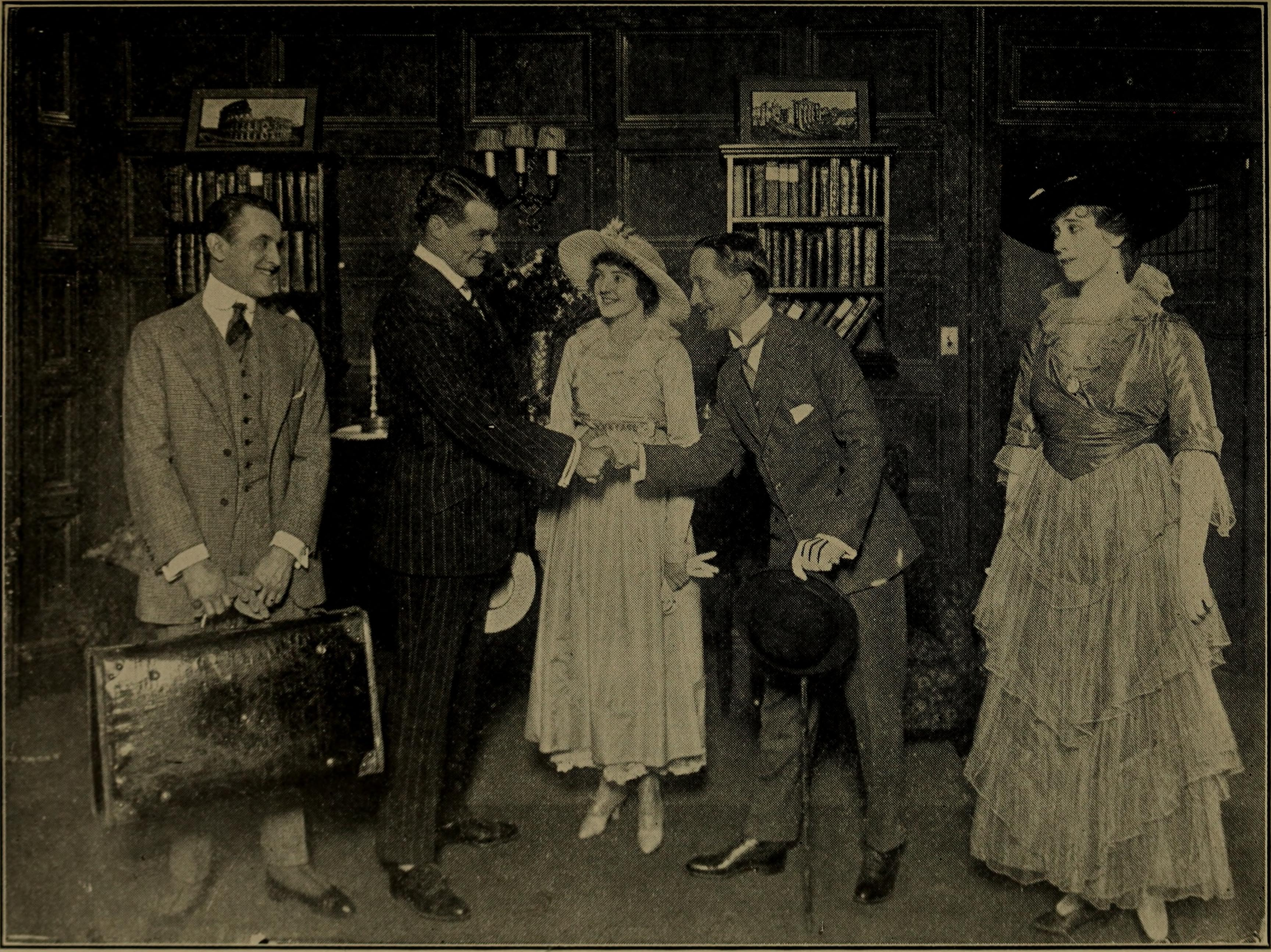
- Scene from His Majesty Bunker Bean, with Bunker carrying a closed suitcase
- Directed by: William Desmond Taylor
- Screenplay by: Julia Crawford Ivers
- Based on: Bunker Bean; 1912 novel by: Harry Leon Wilson 1915 play His Majesty Bunker Bean; Lee Wilson Dodd; Harry Leon Wilson
- Produced by: Jesse L. Lasky
- Starring: Jack Pickford; Louise Huff; Jack McDonald; Frances Clanton; Peggy O'Connell; Edythe Chapman
- Cinematography: Homer Scott
- Production companies: Famous Players–Lasky Corporation; Oliver Morosco Photoplay Company
- Distributed by: Paramount Pictures
- Release date: April 8, 1918
- Running time: 50 minutes
- Country: United States
- Language: Silent (English intertitles)

His Majesty, Bunker Bean is a 1918 American silent comedy film directed by William Desmond Taylor. The film's screenplay was written by Julia Crawford Ivers who adapted her story from both Harry Leon Wilson's 1912 novel Bunker Bean and the novel's subsequent stage adaption, His Majesty Bunker Bean by Lee Wilson Dodd. The film stars Jack Pickford, Louise Huff, Jack McDonald, Frances Clanton, Peggy O'Connell, and Edythe Chapman. The film was released by Paramount Pictures on April 8, 1918.

== Plot ==
As described in a film magazine, through a clairvoyant Bunker Bean learns that in his various incarnations he has been Napoleon and Ramtah, an Egyptian king, and these facts spur him to greater things. He falls heir to some money and invests in stock which yields big returns and in a mummy of Ramtah, his first incarnation. He marries the daughter of his boss and, although at first afraid to face her parents, he summons the personages of his various incarnations to give him the strength to conquer and win them over.

== Cast ==
- Jack Pickford as Bunker Bean
- Louise Huff as Breede's daughter
- Jack McDonald as Jim Breede
- Frances Clanton as Mrs. Wife
- Peggy O'Connell as Breede's oldest daughter
- Edythe Chapman as Older Mrs. Breede
- Jack Hoxie as The greatest pitcher
- Gustav von Seyffertitz as Professor Balthasar
- Edith M. Lessing as Countess Casanova

== Preservation status ==
The picture is lost.

- Warner Brothers remade the film in 1925 starring Matt Moore. That film survives abridged or incomplete.
