= His Majesty Bunker Bean (play) =

1915 play by Lee Wilson Dodd

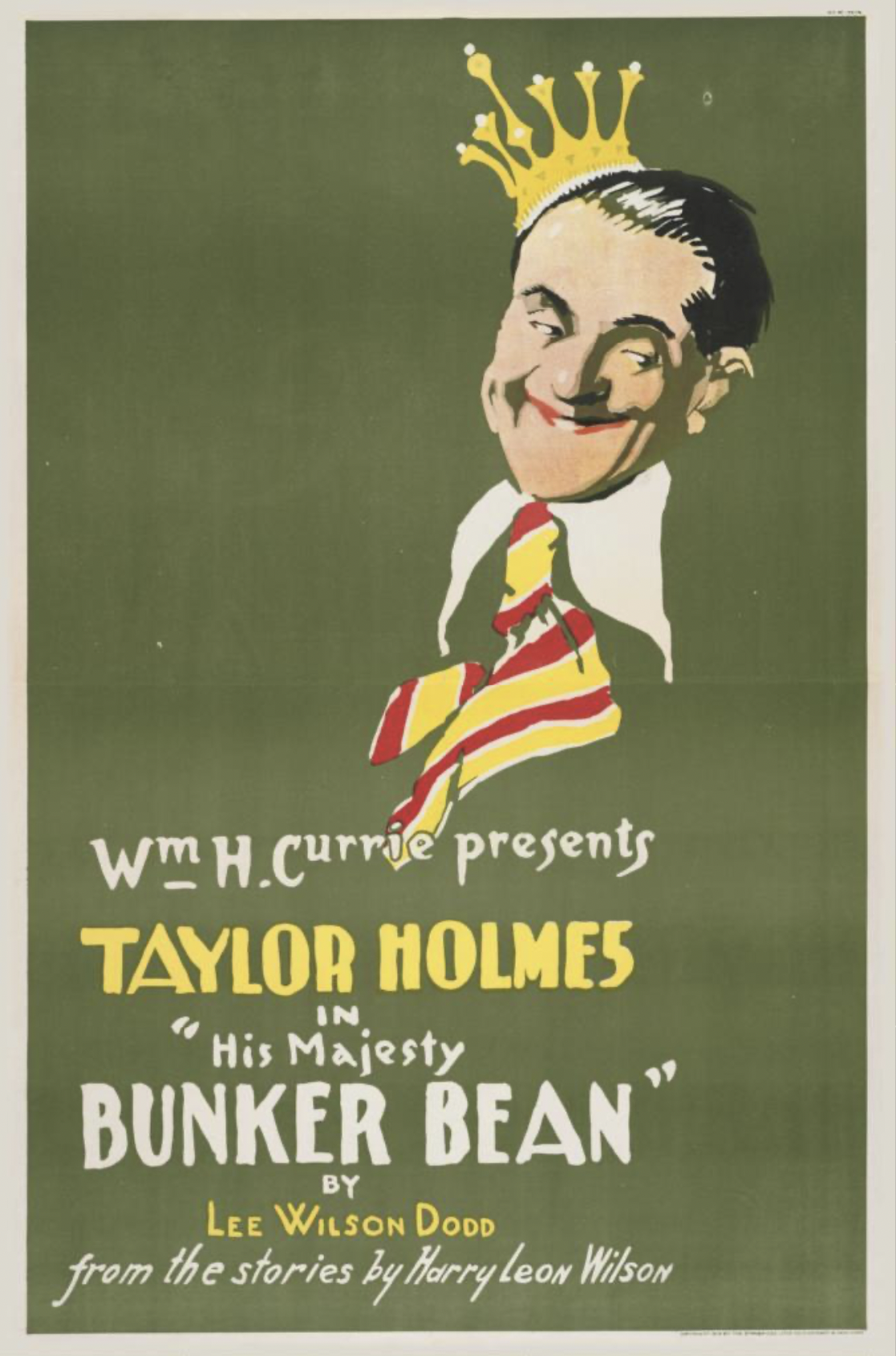
Theatre poster for His Majesty Bunker Bean.

His Majesty Bunker Bean is a play in four acts by Lee Wilson Dodd based on the 1912 novel Bunker Bean by Harry Leon Wilson. Led by actor Taylor Holmes in the title role, the farce premiered in Detroit in 1915 prior to touring the Midwestern United States during the 1915–1916 season. This included a six month long stop in Chicago at the Cort Theatre where the play was a popular hit. After a hiatus in the summer 1916, the play resumed performances in Atlantic City in September before transferring to Broadway in October 1916, where it ran for three months at the Astor Theatre. The original production continued to tour until ending in May 1917, after which it was staged by regional theaters in the United States. The play and the novel it was based on were both the source material for multiple film adaptations made between 1918 and 1936.

== Roles and original Broadway cast ==
The following are the roles and original 1916 Broadway cast given in the 1922 publication of the play His Majesty Bunker Bean by Samuel French, Inc. While a complete cast list was not provided in the Detroit Times review of the play's premiere in 1915, those actors named in the review match the Broadway cast, and a return engagement to Detroit in 1916 prior to its Broadway run indicated the original cast remained in the production.

- Bunker Bean (Taylor Holmes)
- James Breede, a.k.a. "Pops" (Charles Abbe)
- Bulger (Jack Devereaux)
- Larahee (Horace Mitchell)
- The Flapper (Florence Shirley)
- Mason (John Hogan)
- The Waster (Harry C. Power)
- Mops (Marion Kerby)
- The Big Sister (Clara Louise Moores)
- Grandma, the Demon (Lillian Lawrence)
- The Countess (Grace Peters)
- Maid (Annette Westbay)
- Balthazar (Walter Sherwin)
- The Greatest Left-Handed Pitcher the World Has Ever Known (Robert Kelly)
- Janitor (George C. Lyman)
- The Lizzie Boy (Belford Forrest)
- Louis (George O'Rourke)
- The Very Young Minister (John Hogan)

== Plot ==
Bunker Bean is a stenographer who lacks self-confidence and initiative. He is transformed after a meeting with the Countess, a psychic, who convinces him that he is the reincarnation of the Egyptian Pharaoh Ram-Tah, a king of allegedly great historic importance. This false belief instills in Bunker Bean a renewed sense of confidence and self importance which allow him to go boldly into the world with kingly resolve. A farcical comedy ensues when Bean fires himself from his job. He ends up besting his former boss in business, and becomes romantically involved with his former boss's daughter, The Flapper, after she discovers a mummy in Bunker Bean's room and becomes fascinated with a man she previously found dull. Bean obtained the mummy from Egypt after sending off for the remains of his former self, Ram-Tah. A comedy of absurdity ensues with a revolving group of eccentric characters. All ends well in the end.

== History ==
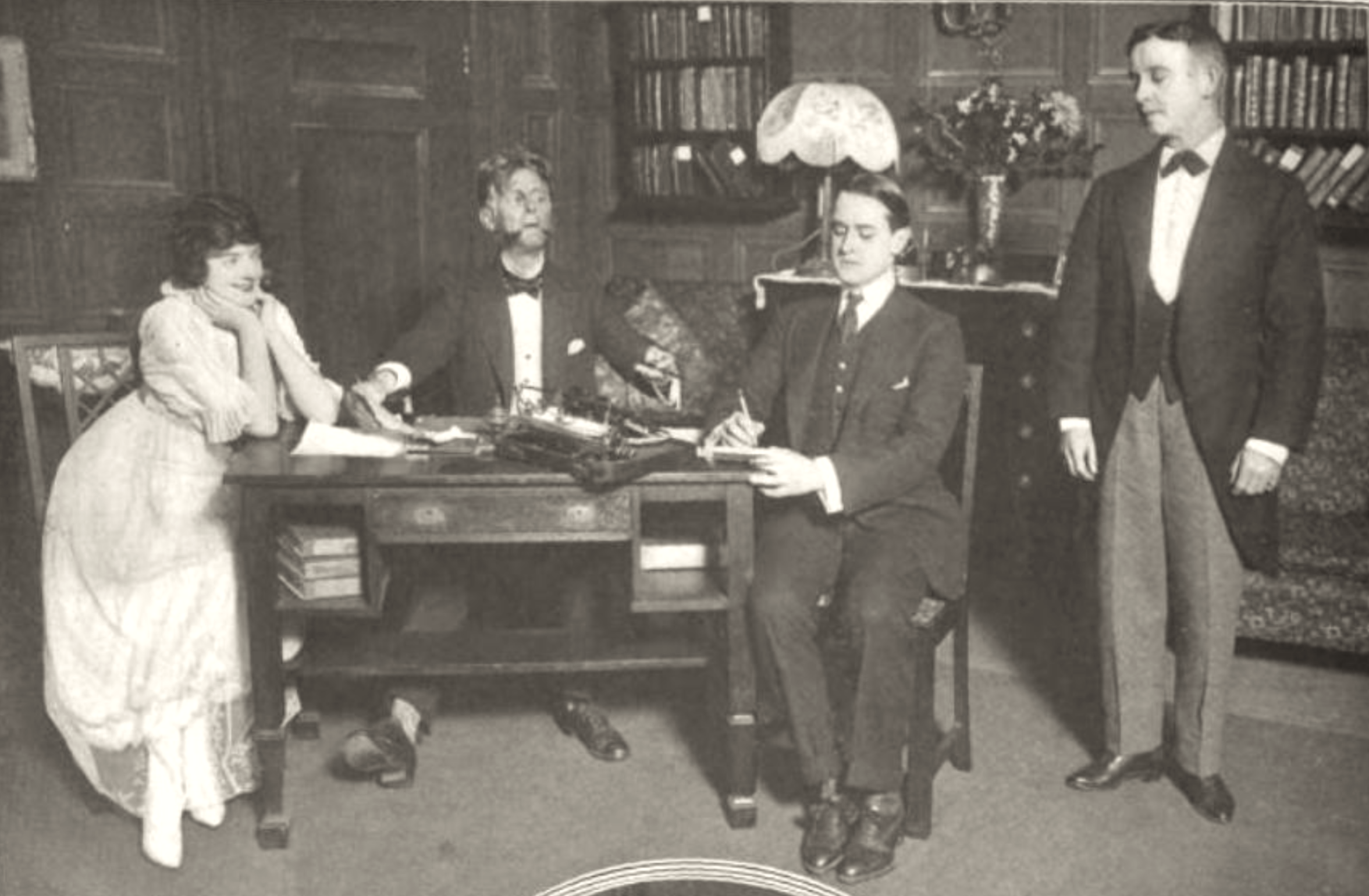
From left to right: Florence Shirley, Charles Abbe, Taylor Holmes, and George C. Lyman in His Majesty Bunker Bean.

=== Premiere, tour, and Chicago run ===
Produced by theatre impresario Joseph Brooks, His Majesty Bunker Bean premiered at the Garrick Theatre in Detroit on September 27, 1915, with Taylor Holmes in the title role. The production marked the first leading role for Holmes who had previously only portrayed secondary comic roles on the stage. It then played at the Alvin Theater in Pittsburgh, the Teck Theatre in Buffalo, New York. the Belasco Theatre in Washington D.C., and the Cort Theatre in Chicago. A hit at the latter theatre, the production broke box office records in Chicago where it remained for an extended run. Chicago Examiner critic Ashton Stevens wrote the following in his review:

The amount of loose writing that Mr. Dodd has left out of the play is to be reckoned as more than a negative virtue. Itchingly a flip written would have been tempted to extraneous ticklings, to clamorous 'situations', to putty 'characterizations.' Mr. Dodd is delectably temperate; his sobriety enhances the inherent humor of plot and person; he writes a rollicking tale apparently not with pen and ink, but with flesh and blood.

After a six month long run in Chicago, the Bunker Bean production resumed touring at the end of March 1916 with its first stop being at the Oliver Opera House in South Bend, Indiana. This was followed by a return engagement at the Garrick Theatre in Detroit with the Detroit Times noting that the original cast remained intact. Some of the other stops on the tour included the Waterloo Theatre in Waterloo, Iowa, the Oliver Theatre in Lincoln, Nebraska, Boyd's Theater and Opera House in Omaha, the Burtis Opera House in Davenport, Iowa, the Grand Opera House in Dubuque, Iowa, the Cecil Theatre in Mason City, Iowa, the Majestic Theatre in Fort Wayne, Indiana, the Orpheum Theatre in Racine, Wisconsin, the Municipal Theatre (later renamed the Mineral Point Opera House) in Mineral Point, Wisconsin, Fuller's Theatre in Madison, Wisconsin, and Myers Theatre in Janesville, Wisconsin.

=== Broadway and beyond ===
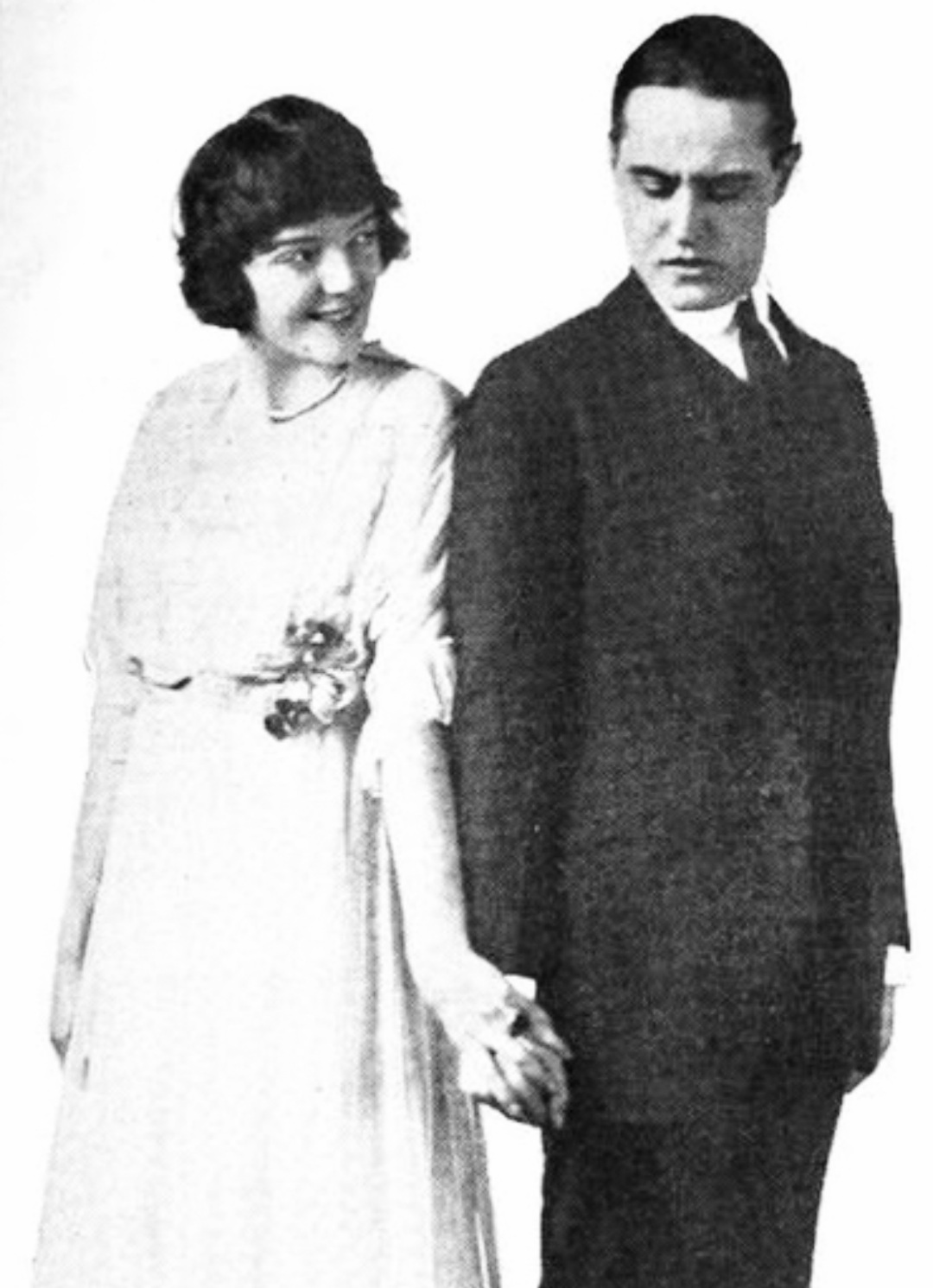
Florence Shirley and Taylor Holmes in a 1916 publicity photo for His Majesty Bunker Bean.

After a summer hiatus, the His Majesty Bunker Bean company resumed performances at the end of September 1916 in Atlantic City. The production moved to Broadway where it opened at the Astor Theatre on October 2, 1916. At the time of its premiere, a critic for The Washington Times noted that the play had followed an unusual path: rather than being a play which toured the country after becoming a hit play on the New York stage as was typical, this play had already been a national hit and had "been seen by most of the country east of the Mississippi River" prior to reaching Broadway.

The New York Sun reviewer felt that the play was a faithful adaptation of the novel and that readers of the book enjoyed the play the most. The New York Times critic praised the performances of the ensemble as a whole but was critical of Holmes, stating "Mr. Holmes is an expert, engaging, facile farceur whom many of us believe capable of fine work in high comedy. He is a born entertainer, and, from the beginning to end of the new play at the Astor he is amusing. But he is disappointing, because half the subtleties of the role escape him." The Philadelphia Inquirer was more positive, stating "The press and the public agree that it is one of the cleverest and most entertaining farces of the present season. Taylor Holmes is an excellent comedian, and in the present instance he has a part which gives him a better opportunity for the display of his talents than any play in which he has appeared for five years. Every critic thinks well of it, strange as it may appear. They don't generally agree."

His Majesty Bunker Bean ended its Broadway run in December 1916 after 72 performances. During its final week in New York the show's producer Joseph Brooks died on November 27, 1927. It was unclear whether his death was due to an accidental fall or a suicide; with his death resulting from the impact of an eight-story drop from his apartment at 140 W. 179th St. The New York Sun listed it as still at the Astor Theatre on December 3, 1916, but the production swiftly moved to Boston where it opened at the Majestic Theatre on December 4, 1926. Unlike other critics, Boston Post drama critic Edward Harold Crosby did not feel that the play adhered closely to the novel, stating the following:

Lee Wilson Dodd has taken Mr. Wilson's story and from it constructed a play which at times is straight comedy and again strolls into the realm of farce. He has taken many of the personages, some of whom he has given added prominence... He has eliminated others and he has made the central theme of Mr. Wilson's plot subsidiary to the general story. Thus, and therefore, those who have read Bunker Bean in book form will see quite a different version in the play.

By January 1917, advertisements for His Majesty Bunker Bean named William H. Currie as the producer of the production. Currie had previously served as the manager of the original touring production under producer Joseph Brooks. He continued as the named producer for the 1917 portion of tour which included stops at the Park Theatre in Bridgeport, Connecticut, the Royal Alexandra Theatre in Toronto, the Hartman Theater in Columbus, Ohio, the Washington Theatre in Richmond, Indiana, the Murat Theatre in Indianapolis, and the Lyric Theatre in Cincinnati. The Cincinnati Commercial Tribune reported in April 1917 that Currie had acquired the rights to His Majesty Bunker Bean following Brooks's death. The tour's final stops were a return first to Chicago where it ran for two final weeks at the Princess Theater, and a return to New York City where it played at the Standard Theatre for a limited engagement in late April and early May 1917.

After the tour ended the play was performed regionally. Frank Darien portrayed Bunker Bean in a production at the Orpheum Theatre in Oakland, California in the summer of 1917. The Shubert Theater in Minneapolis staged the play in September 1917 with actor Albert McGovern (born 1882) in the title role.

== Adaptations ==
Dodd's play and Wilson's novel were the basis for the 1918 silent film His Majesty, Bunker Bean which starred Jack Pickford in the title role. Julia Crawford Ivers wrote the scenario for the film which was directed by William Desmond Taylor. A second silent film in 1925 was made that also used by the play and novel as its source, and both works were also used by RKO Pictures for their 1936 sound film, Bunker Bean, the latter of which starred Owen Davis, Jr., Louise Latimer, and Lucille Ball.
