= Helicon Home Colony =

Experimental community in the U.S.

Coordinates: 40.889°N 73.958°W

Helicon Home Colony was an experimental community formed by author Upton Sinclair in Englewood, New Jersey, United States, with proceeds from his novel The Jungle. Established in October 1906, it burned down in March 1907 and was disbanded. Sinclair's initial plan for the colony included farms, a communal kitchen, nurseries for children and other services to make it entirely self-sufficient, and would contain about 100 houses on a 400-acre lot. Opinions of the colony were supportive, with the New York Times noting the difficulties of raising a family alone in the city.

However, writers also raised concerns over the amount of funds required to purchase as much land as was initially planned, as well as the challenge of operating on an entirely communal basis. The colony eventually opened in a New Jersey school building in October 1906, and about 46 adults and 15 children lived in the community in the short time before it closed.

== History ==
In a 1906 article in The Independent, Sinclair outlined a plan for a home colony located within one-hour of New York City. Following the model proposed by Charlotte Perkins Gilman in her book The Home, Sinclair sought "authors, artists, and musicians, editors and teachers and professional men" who wanted to avoid the drudgeries of domestic life. A farm community would be established that would generate its own meat, milk and produce. Food would be served in a communal kitchen and children raised in separate nurseries. The community would be run by a board of directors. While Sinclair insisted that the project was not a Socialist one, he did think that those interested in participating "would have to be in sympathy with the spirit of socialism". Sinclair planned for about 100 houses on a 400-acre (1.6 km^{2}) lot, and would get proposals for architects and business experts to create a business plan for the endeavor.

In a letter published in The New York Times on July 16, 1906, Sinclair outlined his plan and announced a public meeting to be held the following evening at the Berkeley Lyceum on 44th Street. Employed individuals would join a cooperative and build homes of their own design that would not have kitchens or space for children. The community would use machinery to increase efficiency and "solve the problem of the management of servants". The community would be run by a democratically elected board and would own enough land to produce as much of its own food as possible. Children would be cared for separately and overseen by a Board of Women Directors elected by their mothers. Lecture halls, reading rooms and other common facilities would be provided. Due to concerns over operating the community on an entirely communal basis, the community eventually hired traditional servants, putting the initial beliefs of the project in question.

The Times published an editorial the day after the colony's founding, which was supportive of the meeting and noting the difficulties of raising a family in the city. However, the editors raised concerns that to purchase land in proximity to New York City would require substantial outlays beyond the means of most. The editorial questioned the practicability of raising children on a communal basis, noting that "There would be more fun in that spectacle -- for outsiders -- than in the traditional barrel of monkeys."

Some 300 people attended the public meeting on July 17. Sinclair led the two-hour meeting and spoke for three-quarters of the session. It was agreed that both men and women who paid the $10 initiation fee would be eligible to vote. Sinclair stated that he had offers of suitable land in the New York City area at $10 to $50 per acre, refuting claims made in the editorial in The Times that appropriate land would cost as much as $3,000 to $40,000 an acre. Gaylord Wilshire was named temporary treasurer, and Sinclair announced that commitments of $50,000 had already been made. Sinclair reported that he had distributed a questionnaire nationwide and had received 44 responses, including one from a meat packer in Brooklyn. In addition to details on the types and manner of food to be served in the proposed colony, respondents had indicated that they preferred to be close to New York City, preferably in New Jersey.

The colony opened in Englewood, New Jersey, in October 1906. It was located in an old school building, Helicon Hall, on the north side of Walnut Street, between Woodland and Lincoln Streets. During its existence about 46 adults and 15 children lived there. A young Sinclair Lewis, later a popular author, worked as a janitor there.

The colony suffered problems in just a short period of time. An outbreak of chicken pox affected 10 children at the colony in February 1907. The colony's building burned down March 16, 1907 with one man, Lester Briggs, dying in the fire. The colony disbanded, with members (but not Upton Sinclair) being returned their investments through insurance payments. At the time of the fire the Colony had over 70 residents including colonists, boarders, and workers.

== Race-exclusion ==
Helicon Home Colony had a rigorous screening process for the applicants, including a restriction against those of color. The application stated: “The colony should be open to any white person of good moral character”. They explicitly banned Black people and less publicly banned Jews. "According to Perdita Buchan, writing in the 2007 book Utopia, New Jersey: Travels in the Nearest Eden, Sinclair himself quietly returned one rejected applicant's money, apologizing that the other members had voted against allowing Jewish people to join the Helicon Home Colony" even though Sinclair himself "owned 160 of Helicon's 230 shares" and "ostensibly controlled about 70% of the board's vote and could have overruled anyone if he had thought it appropriate."

== Colony members ==
- Upton Sinclair, Founder
- Meta Fuller Sinclair, wife of Upton Sinclair
- Frances Maule Bjorkman and Edwin Bjorkman
- Mr. & Mrs. J. M. Bowles
- Lester Briggs, carpenter
- Grace MacGowan Cooke, author
- Mr. & Mrs. A. C. Craig
- Mrs. Florence Eddy
- Mrs. Helen Fitchenberg, head cook
- W. T. Grinnell
- Emma Hahn, Financial Superintendent of the Colony
- Charles Helliker, engineer
- Margaret Hogue, writer
- Henrietta Kimball, artist
- Helen Knoll, worker
- Alice MacGowan, author (sister)
- Grace MacGowan, author (sister)
- Prof. & Mrs. William Montague, Columbia University
- B.H. Nadal, poet
- Prof. & Mrs. Anna Noyes, Teachers College
- Mr. & Mrs. Edwin C. Potter
- Percy Russell
- Edith Somers, Upton Sinclair's secretary
- Dora Steinlein
- Louis Tabor
- Mr. Charles M. Williams
- Mrs. Emma Williams

Children

- Helen MacGowan Cooke
- Catharine Cooke
- David Sinclair
- William Montague

== Sources ==
- Buchan, Perdita. Utopia, New Jersey: Travels in the Nearest Eden, Rivergate Books (an imprint of Rutgers University Press), 2007. ISBN 0-8135-4178-6
- Kaplan, Laurence. A utopia during the progressive era : the Helicon Home Colony, 1906-1907, American Studies, Vol. 25, No. 2: Fall 1984.
