= The Return of Eve =

1916 American film

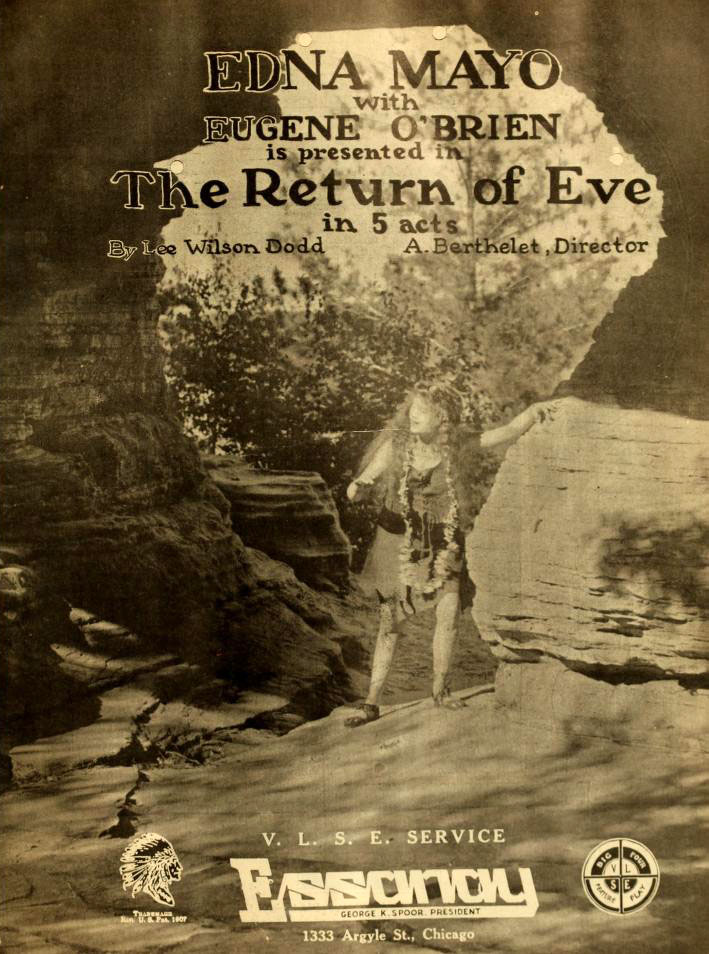
- Moving Picture World advertisement
- Directed by: Arthur Berthelet
- Written by: H. S. Sheldon
- Based on: The Return of Eve by Lee Wilson Dodd
- Starring: Edna Mayo; Eugene O'Brien; Edward Mawson
- Cinematography: Will E. Smith
- Production company: Essanay Studios
- Distributed by: K-E-S-E Service
- Release date: October 16, 1912
- Running time: 5 reels
- Country: United States
- Language: Silent (English intertitles}}

The Return of Eve, also known as When Eve Came Back, is a 1916 American silent film, adapted from a play by Lee Wilson Dodd. The Essanay Studios five-reel film was directed by Arthur Berthelet with Edna Mayo and Eugene O'Brien in the starring roles. H.S. Sheldon wrote the screenplay. The film is presumed lost.

The play was staged 29 times in 1909, at the Herald Square Theatre on Broadway.

Scenes for the film were shot in the Midwest, including in Chicago, while settings were filmed in northern Wisconsin near the banks of the Dells of the Wisconsin River. The plot features the leads raised in a natural setting before being relocated to a metropolis as adults. They return to pastoral life and reunite.

== Cast ==
- Edna Mayo as Eve
- Eugene O'Brien as Adam
- Edward R. Mawson as David Winters
- Leona Ball as Clarice Bellamy
- Edward Arnold as Seymour Purchwell
- Renee Clemmons as Trixie Shevlin
- John Cossar as John Raymond
- Emily Fitzroy as Mrs. Tupper-Bellamy

== See also ==
- The Misleading Lady (1916 film)
