= The Strange Case of Mary Page =

1916 film

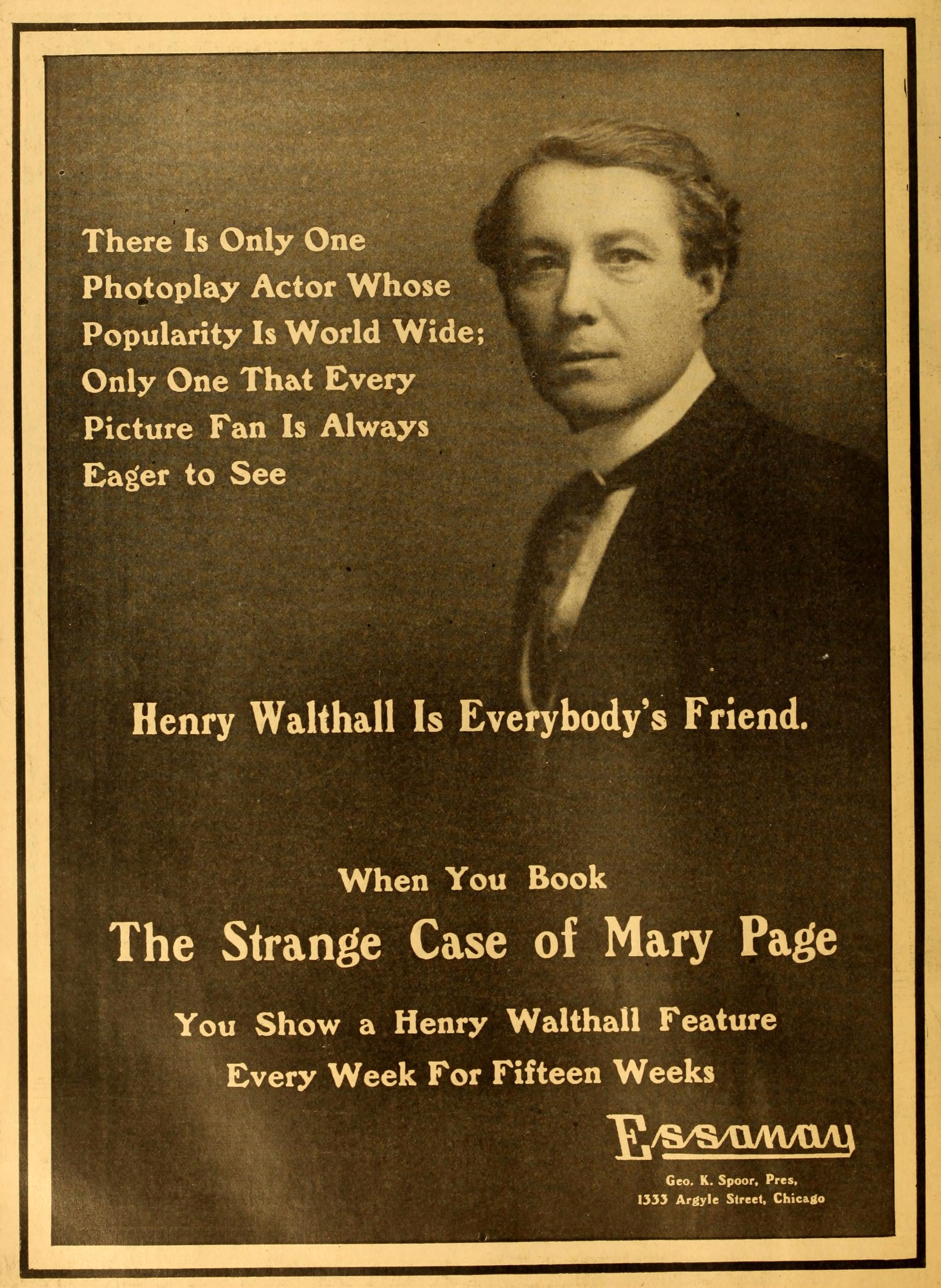
- Film poster
- Directed by: J. Charles Haydon
- Starring: Henry B. Walthall; Edna Mayo
- Distributed by: Essanay Company
- Release date: January 24, 1916
- Running time: 15 episodes
- Country: United States
- Language: Silent (English intertitles)

The Strange Case of Mary Page is a 1916 American drama film serial directed by J. Charles Haydon. Most of the film is considered to be lost, with only two of the episodes preserved.

== Cast ==
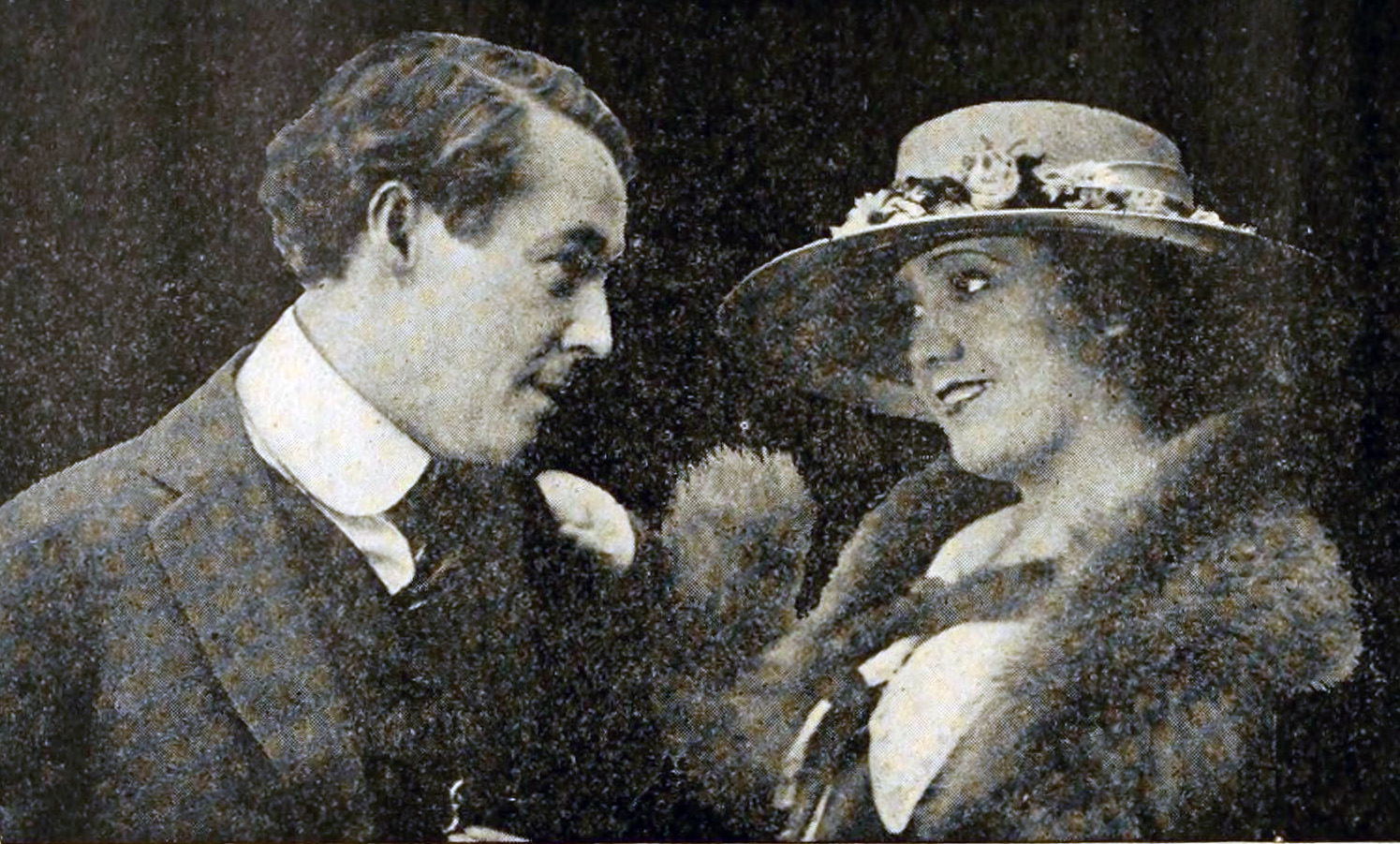
Henry B. Walthall and Edna Mayo

- Henry B. Walthall as Phil Langdon, Attorney
- Edna Mayo as Mary Page
- Sidney Ainsworth as David Pollock
- Harry Dunkinson as E.H. Daniels, Show Manager
- John Cossar as Prosecuting Attorney
- Frank Dayton as Dan Page
- Frances Raymond as Mrs. Page
- John Thorn as Jim Cunningham
- Arthur W. Bates as Young Gambler
- Edmund Cobb
- Frank Hamilton
- Frank Benedict (as Francis Benedict)
- William Chester
- Virginia Valli (as Miss Valli)
- Thomas Commerford as Judge
- Jessie Jones
- Honus Smith
- Edward Arnold as Dr. Foster (Ch. 5)
- Richardson Cotton as Juror (Ch. 5)
- Ernest Cossart

== See also ==
- List of film serials
- List of film serials by studio
- List of lost films
