= Alice MacGowan =

American novelist (1858–1947)

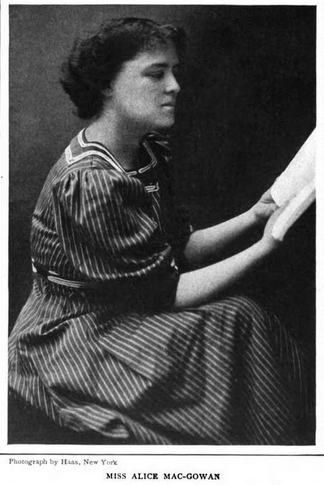
- MacGowan, from a 1908 publication
- Born: December 10, 1858 Perrysburg, Ohio, US
- Died: March 10, 1947 (aged 88) Los Gatos, California, US
- Occupation: Writer

Alice L. MacGowan (December 10, 1858 – March 10, 1947) was an American writer. She and her sister Grace MacGowan Cooke wrote more than 30 novels, about a hundred short stories, and some poetry. Alice produced several best sellers, including Two by Two, that was serialized in the Saturday Evening Post and was published in 1922 in New York under the title The Million Dollar Suitcase.

== Early years ==
She was born in Perrysburg, Ohio, the daughter of John Encil MacGowan and Malvina Marie Johnson. The family moved to Chattanooga, Tennessee, where her sister Grace was born. Alice was educated in public schools in addition to being home schooled by her father, a Colonel with the Union Army during the American Civil War and editor of the Chattanooga Times from 1872 to 1903.

Grace married William Benjamin Cooke on February 16, 1887, in Hamilton, Tennessee. They had two children, Helen M. and Katharine (or "Kit").

Alice was living with her sister at Upton Sinclair's Helicon Home Colony in 1907 when it burned to the ground. Both were taken to Englewood Hospital to recover.

== Career ==
Alice became a writer of short stories and novels, while collaborating with her sister Grace on most of her works. Together they would write over 30 novels, about a hundred short stories, and some poetry. Alice lived in Texas working as a governess.

In December 1908, the MacGowan sisters, with Helen and Katherine, and their mother moved to the semi-remote colony of artists and literati at Carmel-by-the-Sea, California.

The house is listed on the Carmel Inventory Of Historic Resources.

The sisters apparently avoided the more lascivious activities of this Bohemian enclave because a satirical commentator from the Los Angeles Times placed Alice and Grace in the "social faction" known as the "Eminently Respectables". As if to reinforce this image the Times described a 1911 Carmel Christmas party where Jack London, the MacGowan sisters, and the “diminutive dog” Fluffy Ruffles sat at the same table eating lady fingers. Alice actively supported various local charities as well as the Carmel Arts and Crafts Club, and fought the removal of village trees, the paving of the quaint gravel streets and all “encroachments ... of an advancing civilization.”

The two sisters stopped writing together around 1910.

In May 1914, just two months before the start of the highly publicized William Merritt Chase summer school of art in Carmel, the San Francisco press and the New York Times reported that Alice had been intentionally poisoned at her home. The respected Carmel artist Jennie V. Cannon recounted that there had been several previous attempts to murder Alice, who “was popular with everybody.” The perpetrators were never caught.

Carmel proved to be a writer's paradise and Alice produced several best sellers. She co-authored five detective stories with the one-time mayor of Carmel, Perry Newberry (see Bibliography below). Their runaway success, “Two by Two”, was serialized in the Saturday Evening Post and was published in 1922 by Stokes in New York under the title “The Million Dollar Suitcase.” In April 1922 she lectured with Newberry on the "thriller in literature" at Paul Elder's Gallery in San Francisco.

Alice MacGowan--Sole author of at least a dozen books. A worker for many years in the life of Carmel.
Grace Mac Gowan Cooke--She helped make Carmel history and kept young doing it by turning out a string of children's books. Besides writing to make children happy she is the author of novels and mystery tales, some in collaboration with her sister, Alice MacGowan. Her verse has also been published. One of Carmel's most prolific writers. One of the few who came here to write and DID--we should add: and DOES! Mrs. Cooke came to Carmel in 1908, was first President of the Tennessee Woman's Press Club in 1897 and 1898. She has also given us Kit Cooke for which we are grateful!

— Carmel Pine Cone
December 14, 1928

Alice and Grace resumed collaboration with The Straight Road (1917) and The Trail of the Little Wagon (1928).

== Death ==
Alice died in Los Gatos on March 10, 1947. She was a Los Gatos resident for ten years. Funeral services were held from the Melvin Mortuary and at St. Mary's Catholic Church on Bean avenue, where a requiem low mass was celebrated. She was buried at the Los Gatos Cemetery.

== Selected works ==
- The Last Word (1903)
- Return
- Judith of the Cumberlands (1908)
- Wiving of Lance Cleaverage (1909)
- The Sword in the Mountains (1910)
- The Million-dollar Suitcase (1922) with Perry Newberry
- A Girl of the Plains Country (1924)
- The Mystery Woman (1924) with Perry Newberry
- Shaken Down (1925) with Perry Newberry
- The Seventh Passenger (1926)
- Who Is This Man? (1927) with Perry Newberry
