= Merton of the Movies (play) =

Merton of the Movies is a 1922 satirical comedy play by George S. Kaufman and Marc Connelly. It was adapted from the novel of the same name.

== Summary ==
The play, a satire of the film industry, follows Merton Gill, a store clerk who dreams of being a movie star. He saves his small salary and (having studied acting via correspondence school) goes to Hollywood to haunt casting offices. He is befriended by Flips, a stuntwoman. Gill gets a part as an extra, but his appearance is a disaster. But Flips notes that Gill has an uncanny resemblance to matinée idol Harold Parmalee and gets her pal Jeff Baird (modeled on Mack Sennett) to star Gill in spoofs of Parmalee, where Gill's earnest overacting draws unintended laughs. But Gill, who is dedicated to serious drama, can't be let in on the joke.

== Reception and legacy ==
Merton of the Movies opened on Broadway at the Cort Theatre on November 13, 1922. The title role was played by Glenn Hunter, Florence Nash played Flips Montague, and John Webster played Jeff Baird. Hugh Ford staged the play. Heywood Broun called it "The most amusing show of the season" while The New York Times declared it "A delight in every way", and the production was a considerable success, running for 392 performances and closing on October 20, 1923.

Merton of the Movies has been revived on a few occasions. A 1974 production at the Guthrie Theater in Minneapolis starred Michael Moriarty. A production was staged in 1977 at the Ahmanson Theatre in Los Angeles. John Rando directed a 1998 production at the Geffen Playhouse in Los Angeles. A 1990 production in Austin was staged at the John Henry Faulk Living Theatre.

Playbill in 2013 selected Merton of the Movies as one of the five best plays about Hollywood.

== Film adaptations ==
The play (rather than the novel) was used as the basis for the 1924 silent film Merton of the Movies in which Glenn Hunter reprised his Broadway role. It was also the basis for the 1947 version, Merton of the Movies, starring Red Skelton.
