= Oh Doctor! (1925 film) =

1925 film

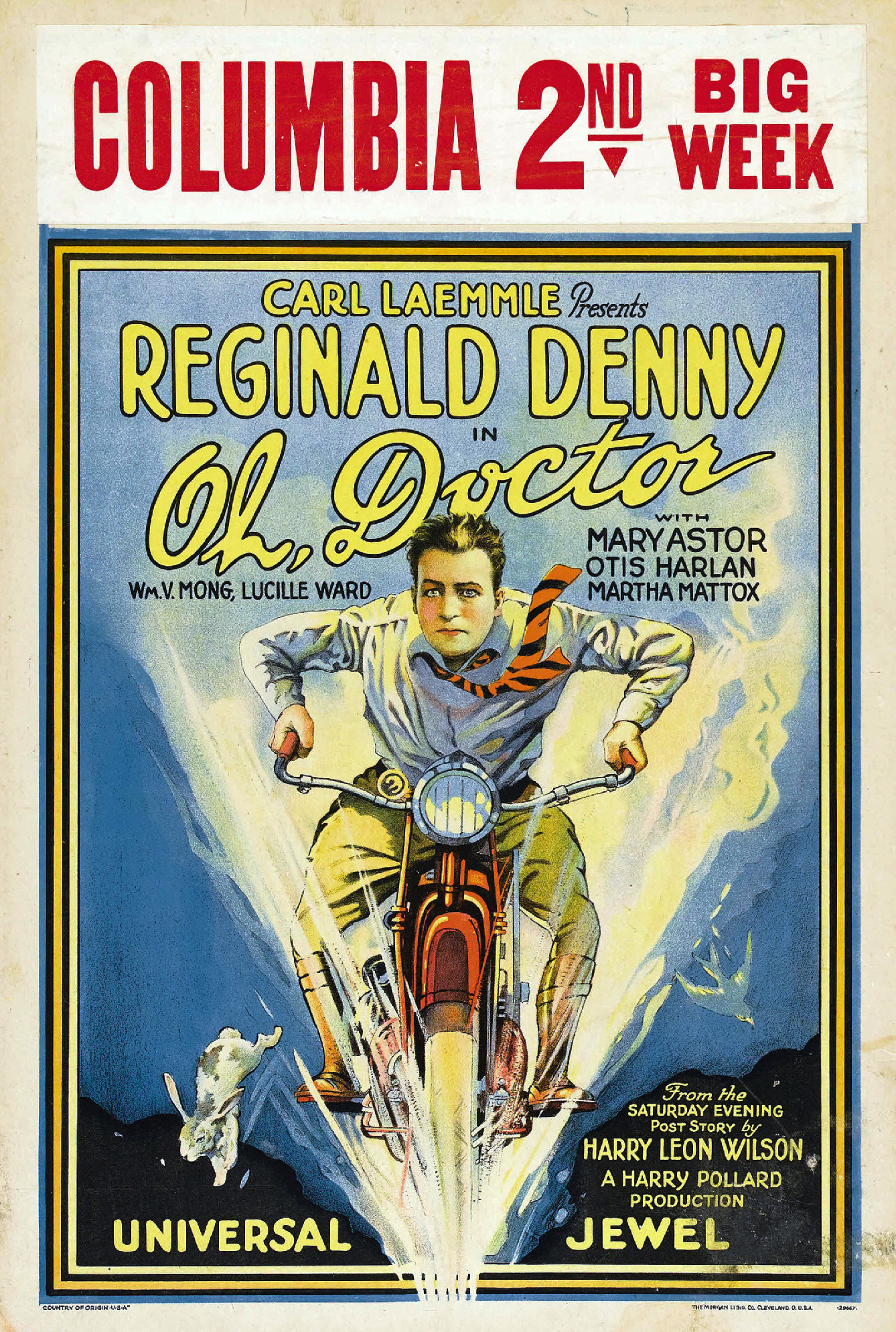
- Poster
- Directed by: Harry A. Pollard
- Screenplay by: Harvey Thew
- Based on: Oh Doctor! (novel); Harry Leon Wilson
- Produced by: Carl Laemmle
- Starring: Reginald Denny; Mary Astor
- Cinematography: Gilbert Warrenton
- Production company: Universal Pictures
- Distributed by: Universal Pictures
- Release date: February 23, 1925
- Running time: 67 minutes
- Country: United States
- Language: Silent (English intertitles)

Oh Doctor! is a 1925 American silent comedy based on the novel of the same name written by Harry Leon Wilson. It was directed by Harry A. Pollard and stars Reginald Denny and Mary Astor. It was produced and released by Universal Pictures. It has been preserved and is available on DVD.

== Plot ==
Rufus Billops, son of wealthy parents, has been reared to manhood believing he is delicate and sickly. He inherits a huge fortune, but it has been placed in some long-term investments, so for some years he will have only a small income. He borrows from three elderly loan-sharks who wish him to live long enough to obtain his principal (so he can pay them). They supply inspiration in the form of a beautiful nurse. Rufus falls in love with her and finding that she admires daring men, he does some reckless stunts that cause his creditors to almost die from anxiety. Dolores, the nurse, creates a scheme to gain the release of his fortune from the lenders, and Rufus finally wins her affection.

Exhibitors Trade Review (1925)

== Cast ==
- Reginald Denny as Rufus Billings Jr.
- Mary Astor as Dolores Hicks
- Otis Harlan as Mr. Cinch
- William V. Mong as Mr. McIntosh
- Tom Ricketts as Mr. Peck
- Lucille Ward as Aunt Beulah Rush
- Mike Donlin as Buzz Titus
- Clarence Geldart as Doctor Seaver
- Blanche Payson as Dr. Maude, The Osteopath
- George Kuwa as Chang
- Martha Mattox as Death Watch Mary Schultz
- Helen Lynch as Maid
- Vincent Rose as Pianist (uncredited)
- Jackie Taylor as Violinist / Orchestra Leader (uncredited)

== Preservation ==
Prints of Oh Doctor! are held by the UCLA Film and Television Archive, Academy Film Archive, and EYE Film Institute Netherlands.
