= Edna Mayo =

American actress

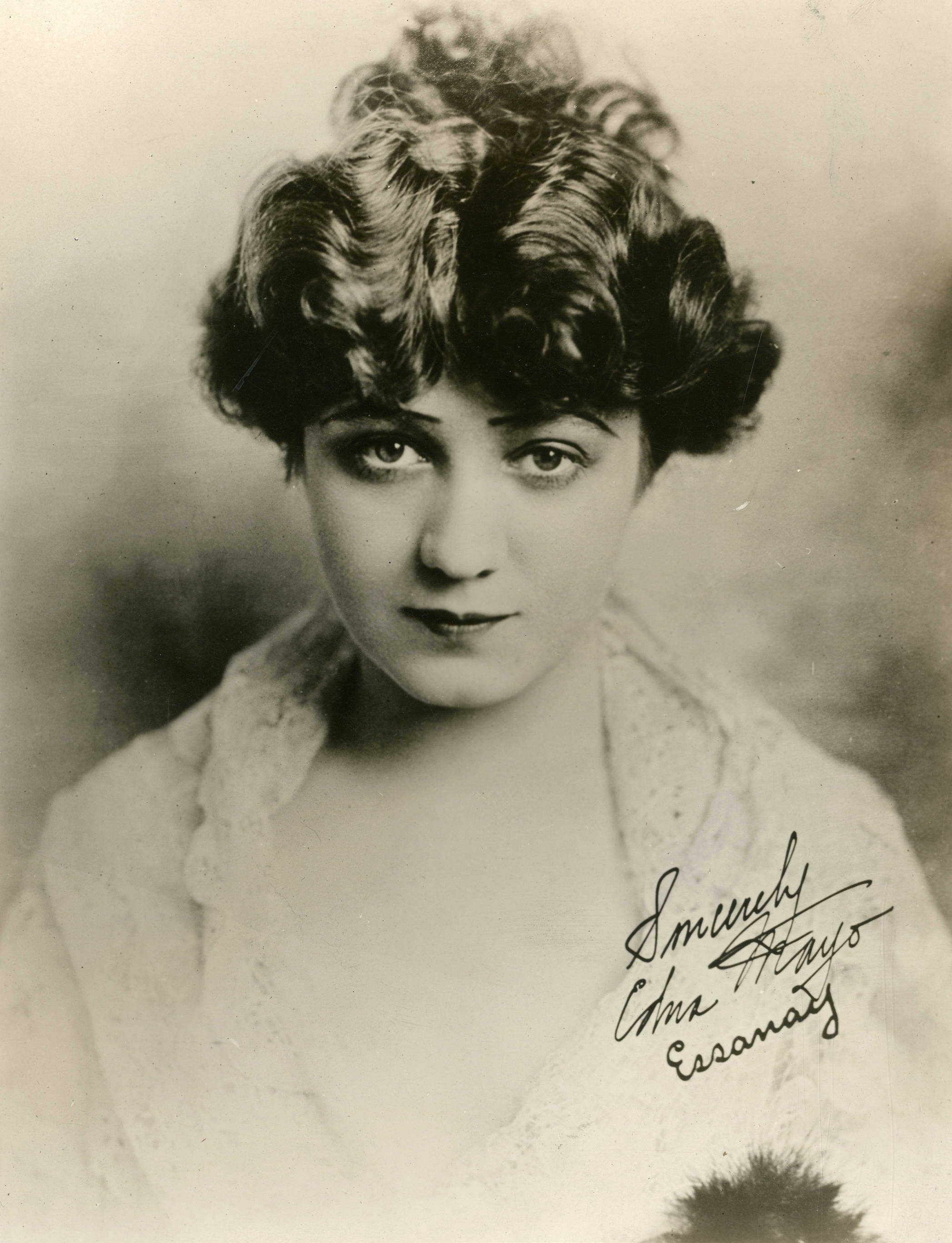
- Mayo in 1916
- Born: Edna Lane; March 23, 1895; Philadelphia, Pennsylvania U.S.
- Died: May 5, 1970 (aged 75); San Francisco, California U.S.
- Occupation: Actress
- Years active: 1914–1918

Edna Mayo (born Edna Lane; March 23, 1895 – May 5, 1970) was an American film actress of the silent film era. She had several starring roles.

== Career ==
Born in Philadelphia, Pennsylvania on March 23, 1895, Mayo spent time as a stage actress before moving to Hollywood in 1914 to pursue an acting career. That year, she received her first role, in the film Michael Arnold and Doctor Lynn opposite Robert Z. Leonard.

In 1914 and 1915, she starred in twenty-two films, and wrote an article for Picture-Play Weekly in 1915 about the differences between using makeup for stage and film.

In 1916, she appeared in four films, including The Return of Eve and The Strange Case of Mary Page. During filming for The Return of Eve, the cast and crew were transported to the Midwest, where they shot the film's metropolitan scenes in Chicago and its rural scenes in northern Wisconsin, near the banks of the Dells of the Wisconsin River. She also filmed locations scenes in Milwaukee, Wisconsin with the cast and crew of The Misleading Lady around this same time.

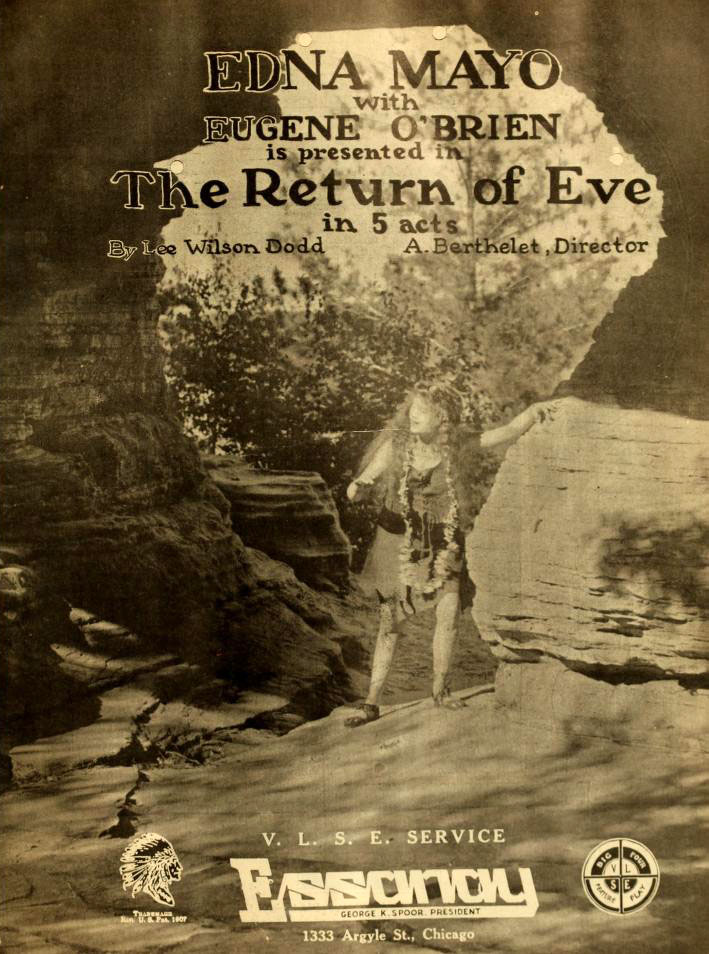
Moving Picture World advertisement

In 1916's The Strange Case of Mary Page, she wore "$10,000 worth of gowns designed by Lady Duff Gordon (Lucile), the famous modiste."

It then took more than a year before she received another role, playing the female lead in Hearts of Love in 1918. That was her final film; she retired from acting.

She eventually settled in San Francisco, California, where she was residing at the time of her death on May 5, 1970.

== Selected filmography ==
- Aristocracy (1914)
- Graustark (1915)
- The Misleading Lady (1916)
- The Return of Eve (1916)
- The Strange Case of Mary Page (1916)
- Hearts of Love (1918)

== Gallery ==
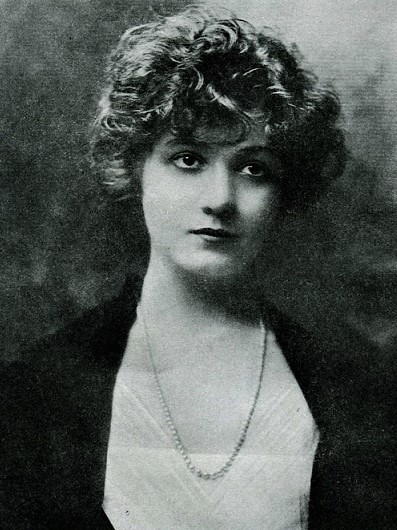

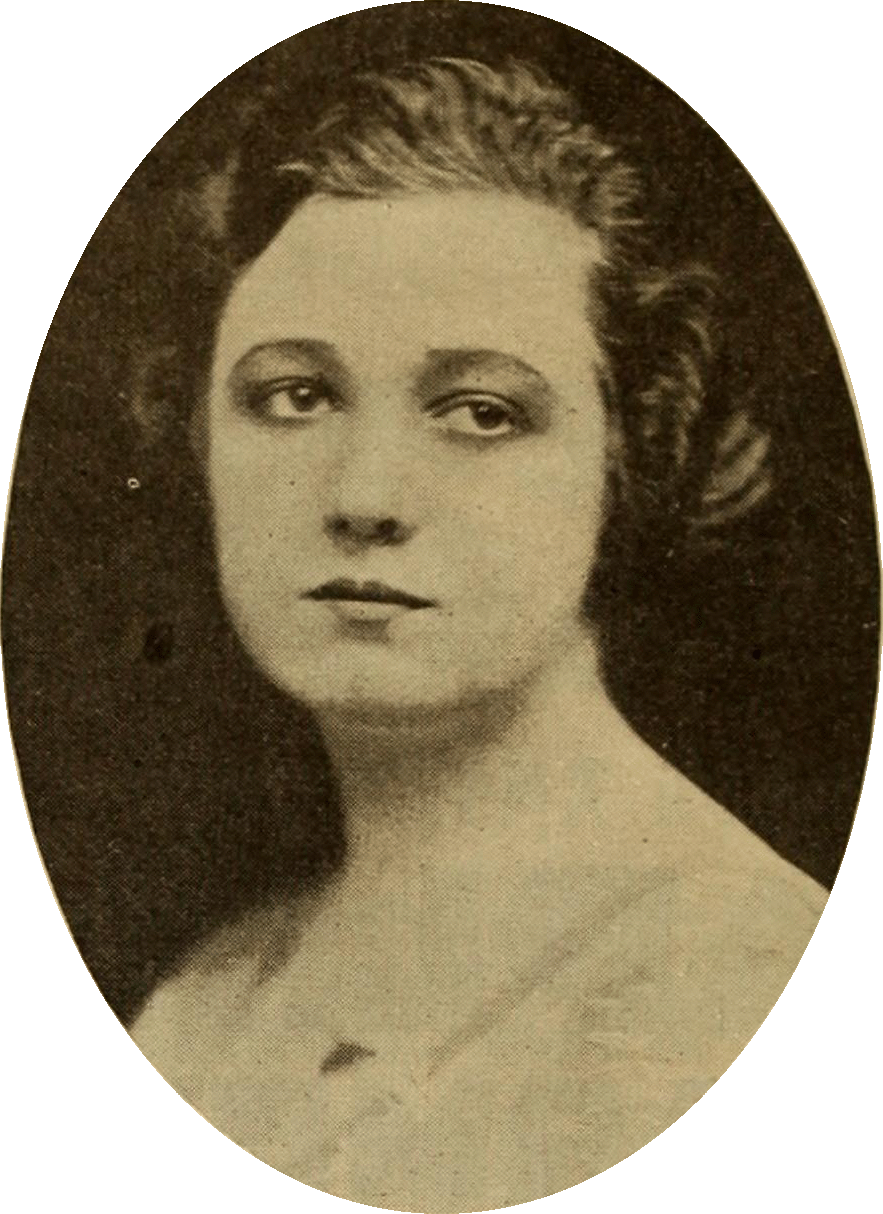
