= Polly of the Movies =

1927 American silent film by Scott Pembroke

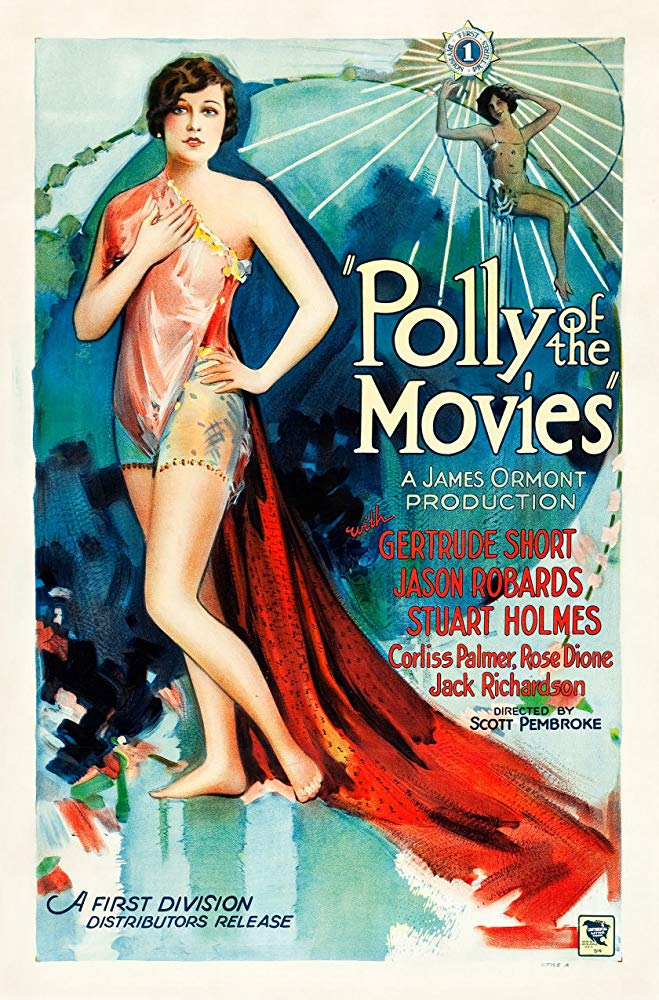
- Directed by: Scott Pembroke
- Written by: George Dromgold; Arthur Hoerl; Jean Plannette
- Produced by: James Ormont
- Starring: Jason Robards; Gertrude Short; Corliss Palmer
- Cinematography: Ted Tetzlaff
- Production company: James Ormont Productions
- Distributed by: First Division Pictures
- Release date: October 15, 1927
- Running time: 70 minutes
- Country: United States
- Languages: Silent; English intertitles

Polly of the Movies is a 1927 American silent comedy film directed by Scott Pembroke and starring Jason Robards, Gertrude Short and Corliss Palmer. It is loosely based on Harry Leon Wilson's 1922 novel Merton of the Movies and its various film adaptations.

== Synopsis ==
A small town girl goes to Hollywood with ambitions of becoming major dramatic star. However, the melodrama she appears in is unintentionally amusing and becomes a comedy hit.

== Cast ==
- Jason Robards as Angus Whitcomb
- Gertrude Short as Polly Primrose
- Corliss Palmer as Lisa Smith
- Stuart Holmes as Benjamin Wellington Fairmount
- Jack Richardson as Rolland Harrison
- Rose Dione as Lulu Fairmount
- Mary Foy as Mrs. Beardsley

== Bibliography ==
- Robert J. Lentz. Gloria Grahame, Bad Girl of Film Noir: The Complete Career. McFarland, 2014.
