= Aristocracy (film) =

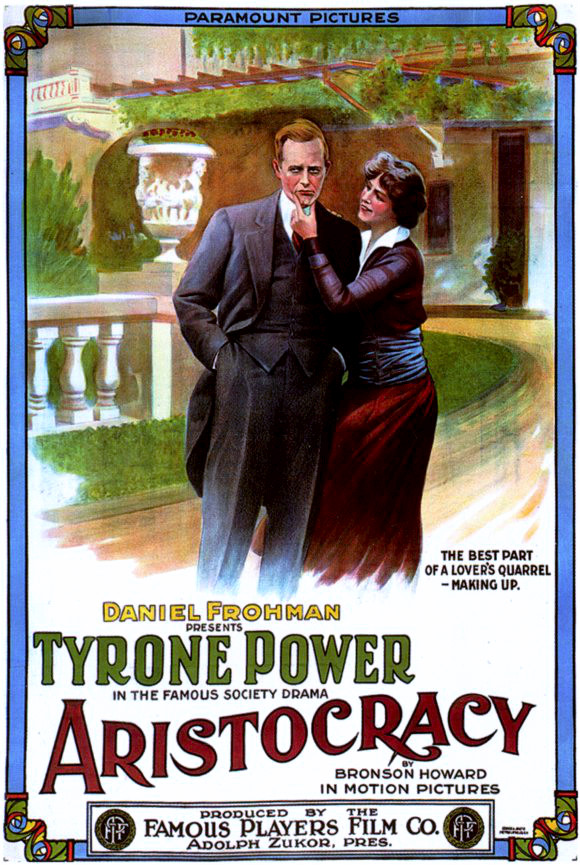
- Theatrical release poster
- Directed by: Thomas N. Heffron
- Written by: Bronson Howard (play)
- Produced by: Daniel Frohman
- Starring: Tyrone Power Sr. Marguerite Skirvin; Edna Mayo; Arthur Hoops; Ida Waterman; William Roselle
- Production company: Famous Players Film Company
- Distributed by: Paramount Pictures
- Release date: November 26, 1914
- Country: United States
- Language: English

Aristocracy is a lost 1914 American drama silent film directed by Thomas N. Heffron and starring Tyrone Power Sr., Marguerite Skirvin, Edna Mayo, Arthur Hoops, Ida Waterman and William Roselle. The film is based upon the play of the same name by Bronson Howard. It was released on November 26, 1914, by Paramount Pictures.

== Plot ==
Jefferson Stockton is a railroad tycoon. His daughter Virginia falls in love, in return, with Stuyvesant Lawrence, a young man who belongs to a high-ranking New York family. The two plan to get married, but Mrs. Lawrence, Stuyvesant's mother, when she learns of her son's engagement, immediately leaves for San Francisco to prevent the marriage, unable to bear the idea of her family becoming related to those new rich so little. elegant.

Stockton, after the breakup of the engagement, convinces his daughter to accompany him and his new young bride, Diana, to Europe, where the tycoon has rented a residence. The girl agrees, but always continues to write to her lover. Stuyvesant also writes to them, but the letters of the two young men are intercepted by Mrs. Lawrence. Eventually, Virginia is convinced that Stuyvesant has forgotten her for another and agrees to marry Prince Emil von Haldenwald, a dowry hunter.

On her wedding night, Virginia discovers that her Stuyvesant is still loyal to her. Not only that, he came to Europe to see her again. Keeping her husband at bay, Virginia stays in her father's house. One evening, however, Emil tries to rape her. Stockton arrives and defends his daughter and throws his son-in-law out of the house. The prince ends badly, killed due to his numerous debts.

Stuyvesant and Virginia find themselves: the new social position of the Stocktons acquired in Europe, now satisfies Mrs. Lawrence who, finally, consents to the marriage.

== Cast ==
- Tyrone Power Sr. as Jefferson Stockton
- Marguerite Skirvin as Diana Stockton
- Edna Mayo as Virginia Stockton
- Arthur Hoops as Prince Emil von Haldenwald
- Ida Waterman as Mrs. Lawrence
- William Roselle as Stuyvesant Lawrence
