= Grace MacGowan Cooke =

American novelist

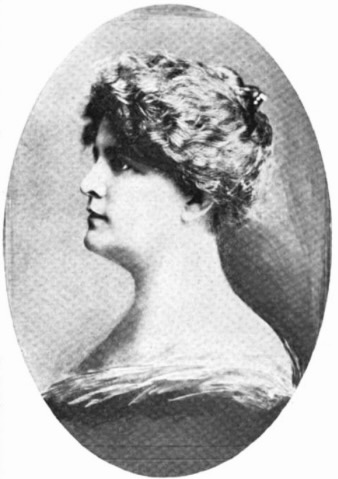
- Cooke in 1903
- Born: Grace P. MacGowan; September 11, 1863; Grand Rapids, Ohio, US
- Died: 24 June 1944 (aged 80); Los Gatos, California, US
- Occupation: Writer
- Spouse: William Benjamin Cooke (m. 1887; div. 1908)
- Children: 2
- Writing career
- Years active: 1901–1928

Grace MacGowan Cooke (September 11, 1863 – June 24, 1944) was an American novelist, poet, and short-story writer. She wrote short stories and novels, often collaborating with her sister, Alice MacGowan. Throughout her career, she wrote 23 novels, 75 short stories, and more than 30 poems.

== Early years ==
She was born in Grand Rapids, Ohio, to John E. MacGowan and Malvina Johnson MacGowan; her sister, Alice MacGowan, also pursued a career as a writer. In 1865, the family relocated to Chattanooga, Tennessee, where the two girls received a combination of public school education and homeschooling. Their father, a Union Army colonel during the American Civil War, was an editor for the Chattanooga Times newspaper from 1872 to 1903.

She married William Benjamin Cooke on February 16, 1887, in Hamilton, Tennessee. They had two children, Helen (1867–1945) and Katharine "Kit" (1900–1971). Both pursued acting in local theater, and Helen married writer Harry Leon Wilson. Grace and William divorced in 1908.

== Career ==
Both Cooke and her sister were school teachers, having started teaching in their teenage years. Following her marriage to Cooke, she assumed the role of bookkeeper for the printing shop, MacGowan & Cooke, which was co-owned by her father, brother, and husband. Cooke began her writing career as a journalist in Tennessee. In 1897, she became the first president of the Tennessee Woman's Press Club. Her debut novel, Mistress Joy, A Tale of Natchez in 1798, was published in 1901 and followed by a series of volumes. She collaborated with her sister on several of these.

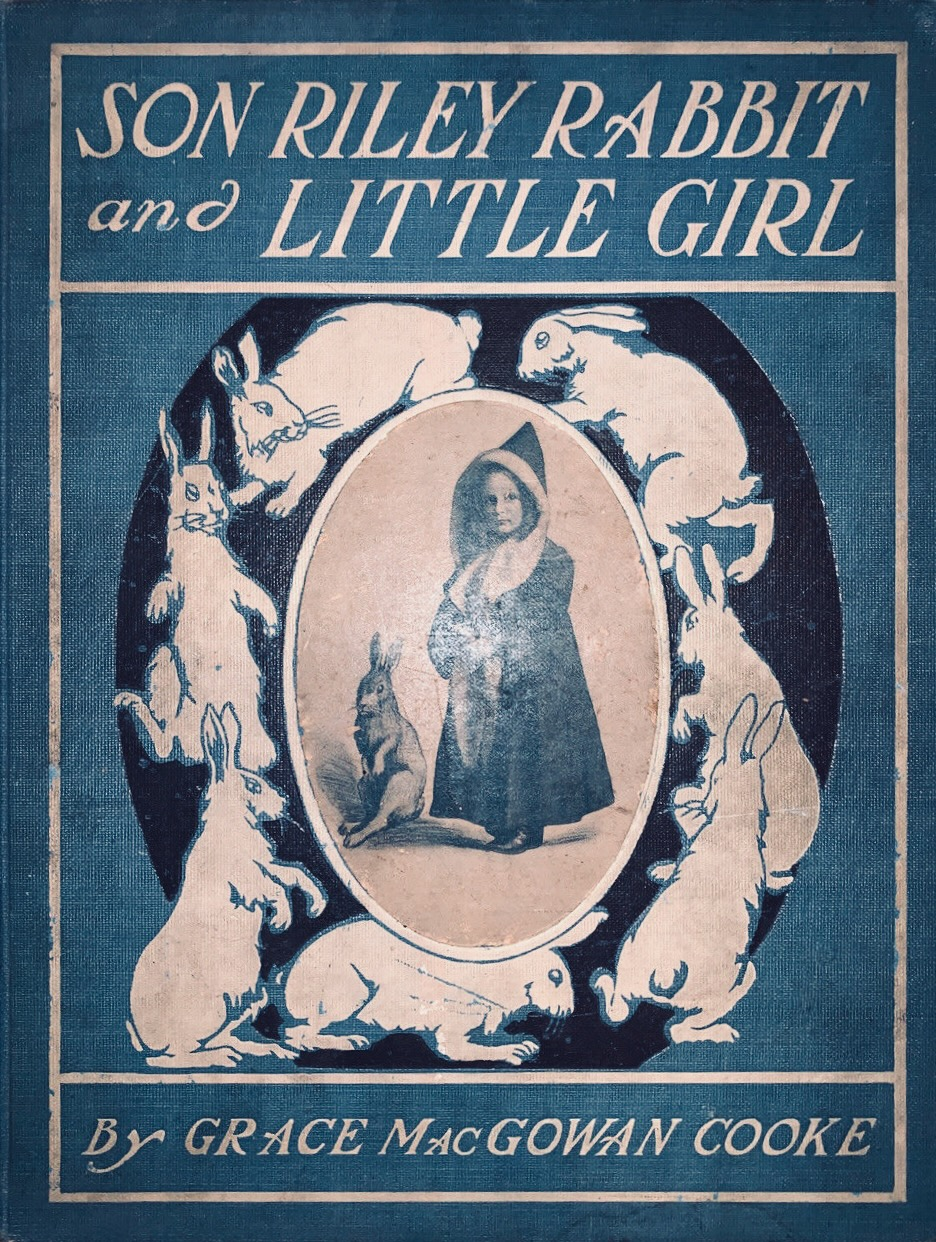
Son Riley Rabbit and Little Girl by Grace MacGowan Cooke (1907)

In 1906, Cooke, her sister and her two daughters, moved to Helicon Home Colony, an experimental community formed by author Upton Sinclair in Englewood, New Jersey. Cooke contributed to The Nautilus, a magazine associated with the New Thought movement. The publication focused on self-help, wellness, and popular health trends. She authored an article titled The Spiritual Meaning of Fletcherism in 1907, delving into the concept of "Fletcherism" and its spiritual implications. She penned the children's book Son Riley Rabbit and Little Girl in 1907, with her daughter Kit posed for the book's illustrations. A satirical commentator from the Los Angeles Times placed the sisters in the "social faction" known as the "Eminently Respectables".

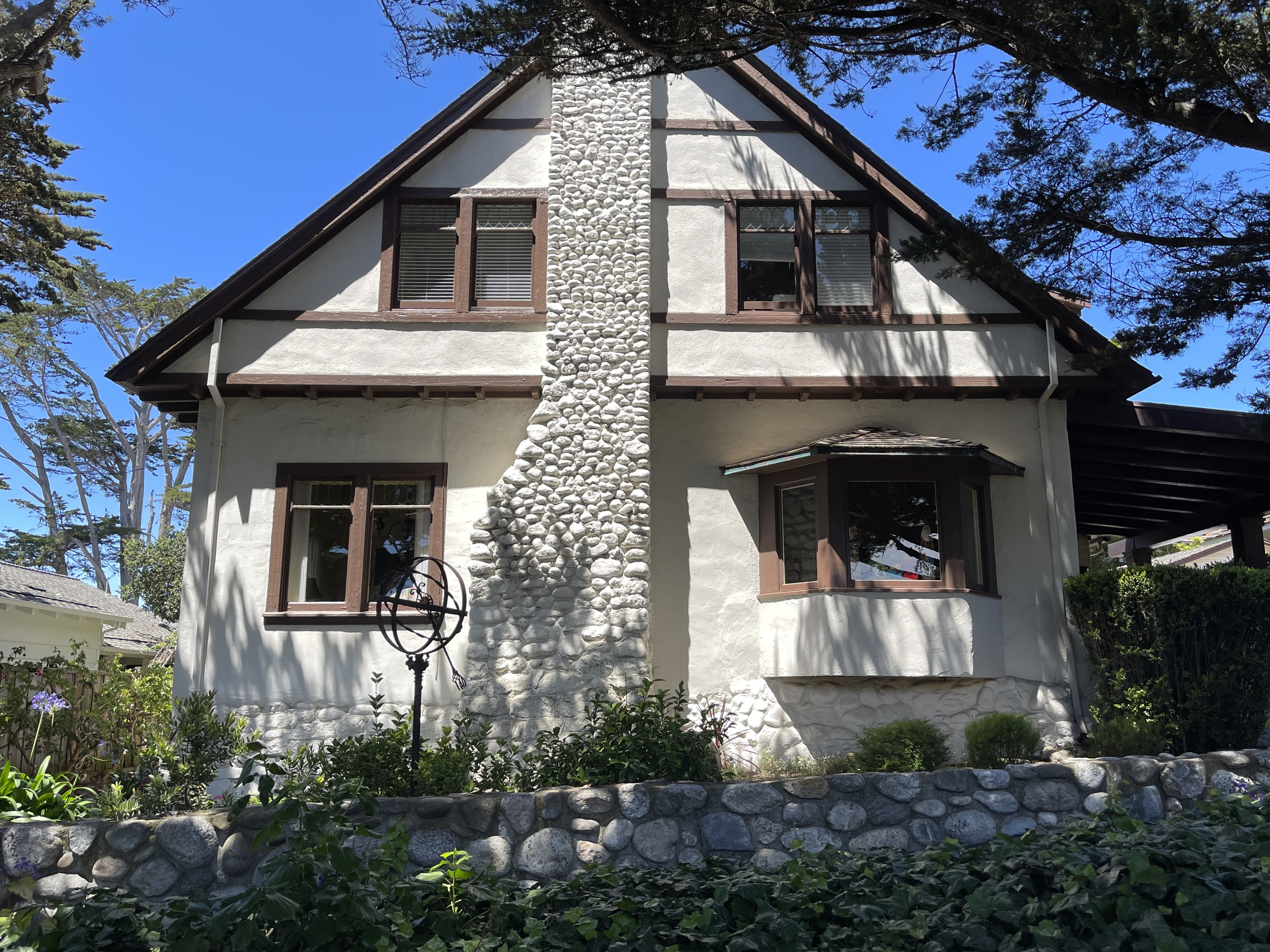
Grace MacGowan Cooke House

In December 1908, the family moved to the art colony at Carmel-by-the-Sea, California, to one of the first homes constructed in southwest Carmel in 1905 by architect Eugenia Maybury, one of the area's first female architects.

In 1919, Cooke traveled with her daughters to the Southwest, conducting research on the lifestyle and traditions of the Hopi. The trip's experience was incorporated into her novel, The Joy Bringer: A Tale of the Painted Desert (1913). In 1910, she also wrote The Power and the Glory, a novel exploring feminist themes and the challenging working conditions in the cotton mills of the Appalachian region.

In May 1914, the Los Angeles Times and the Oakland Tribune reported that Alice had been intentionally poisoned at her home to steal her diamonds and cash. The perpetrator was never discovered. The collaboration between Alice and Grace continued with books The Straight Road (1917) and The Trail of the Little Wagon (1928).

== Death ==
In 1938, Grace relocated to Los Gatos, California. She died in Los Gatos on June 24, 1944. Funeral services were held from the Place Funeral Home.
