= Make Me a Star (film) =

1932 film

- Directed by: William Beaudine
- Screenplay by: Sam Mintz; Walter Deleon; Arthur Kober
- Based on: Merton of the Movies; 1922 novel & play by Harry Leon Wilson; George S. Kaufman (play); Marc Connelly (play); Moss Hart (play)
- Produced by: B.P. Schulberg(uncredited)
- Starring: Joan Blondell; Stuart Erwin; ZaSu Pitts; Ben Turpin
- Cinematography: Allen G. Siegler
- Edited by: Edward Dmytryk; LeRoy Stone
- Music by: John Leipold
- Production company: Paramount Pictures
- Distributed by: Paramount Pictures
- Release date: July 1, 1932 (US)
- Running time: 86 minutes
- Country: United States
- Language: English

Make Me a Star is a 1932 American pre-Code romantic comedy film starring Stuart Erwin, Joan Blondell, and ZaSu Pitts. Directed by William Beaudine, the film is a remake of the 1924 silent film Merton of the Movies, based upon the 1922 novel of that name, and the 1923 play adapted from the novel by George S. Kaufman, and Marc Connelly. It was remade again as Merton of the Movies in 1947.

== Plot ==
A small-town delivery boy Merton Gill arrives in Hollywood, bright-eyed and bushy-tailed and complete with a diploma from the National Correspondence Academy of Acting. Crashing the gates of Majestic Pictures Merton manages to fumble his one line bit in the latest Buck Benson western and is fired on the spot.

== Cast ==
- Joan Blondell as 'Flips' Montague
- Stuart Erwin as Merton Gill
- ZaSu Pitts as Mrs. Scudder
- Ben Turpin as Ben
- Charles Sellon as Mr. Gashwiler
- Florence Roberts as Mrs. Gashwiler
- Helen Jerome Eddy as Tessie Kearns
- Arthur Hoyt as Hardy Powell
- George Templeton as Buck Benson
- Ruth Donnelly as The Countess
- Sam Hardy as Jeff Baird
- Oscar Apfel as Henshaw

Cameo appearances (as themselves)

- Tallulah Bankhead
- Clive Brook
- Maurice Chevalier
- Claudette Colbert
- Gary Cooper
- Phillips Holmes
- Fredric March
- Jack Oakie
- Charles Ruggles
- Sylvia Sidney
