= Bunker Bean (film) =

1936 film by William Hamilton

- Film poster
- Directed by: William Hamilton; Edward Killy
- Written by: Edmund H. North; James Gow; Dorothy Yost
- Based on: Bunker Bean; 1913 novel by: Harry Leon Wilson 1916 play His Majesty Bunker Bean; Lee Wilson Dodd
- Produced by: William Sistrom
- Starring: Owen Davis, Jr. Lucille Ball
- Cinematography: David Abel
- Edited by: Jack Hively
- Music by: Roy Webb; Arthur Lange
- Distributed by: RKO Pictures
- Release date: June 26, 1936
- Running time: 67 minutes
- Country: United States
- Language: English

Bunker Bean is a 1936 American black-and-white comedy film adapted from Harry Leon Wilson's novel Bunker Bean and the subsequent play adaptation, His Majesty Bunker Bean, by Lee Wilson Dodd. It was directed by William Hamilton and Edward Killy, produced by William Sistrom, and starred Owen Davis, Jr. as the title character. The cast included Lucille Ball as Miss Kelly.

== Plot ==
The plot features a stenographer who delves into beliefs about reincarnation as he pursues business and relationship successes.

== Cast ==
- Owen Davis, Jr. as Bunker Bean
- Louise Latimer as Mary Kent
- Robert McWade as John 'J.C.' Kent
- Jessie Ralph as Grandmother
- Lucille Ball as Rosie Kelly
- Berton Churchill as Professor Balthazer
- Edward Nugent as Mr. Glab
- Hedda Hopper as Dorothy Kent
- Ferdinand Gottschalk as Dr. Meyerhauser
- Leonard Carey as Butler
- Russell Hicks as Al C. Jones
- Sibyl Harris as Countess Cassandra
