= Lee Wilson Dodd =

American poet (1879–1933)

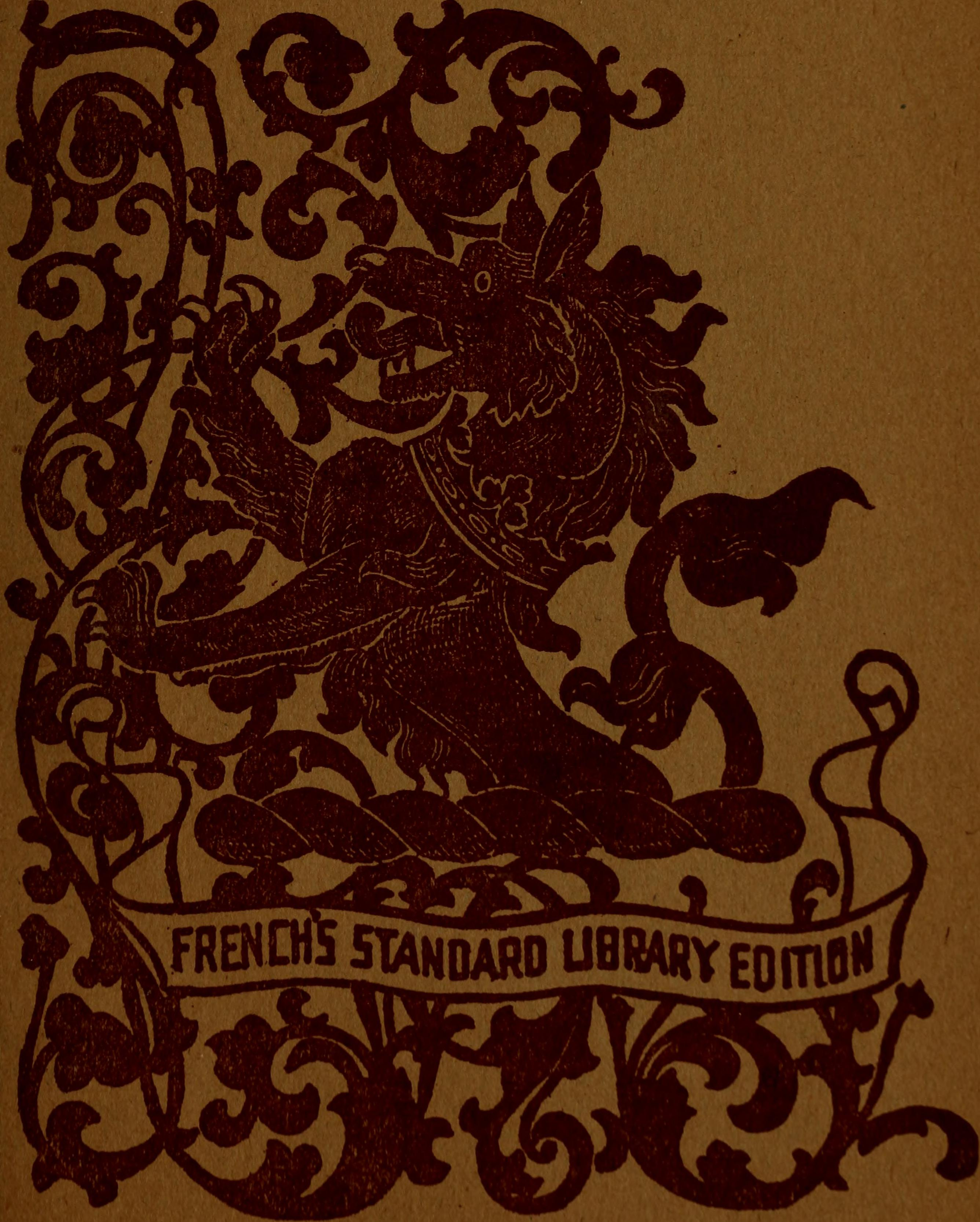
His Majesty Bunker Bean, a comedy in four acts (1922)

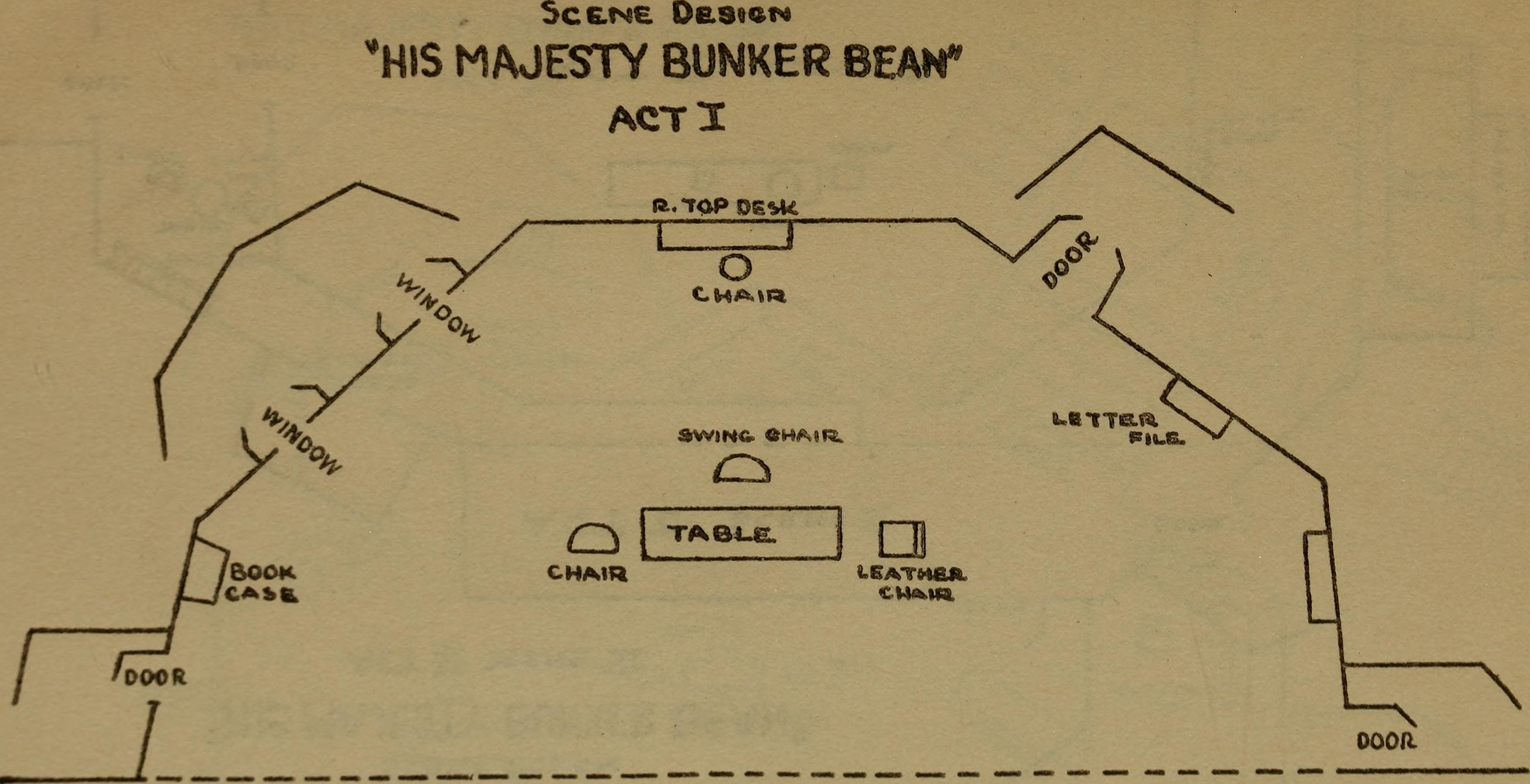
Set design schematic for His Majesty Bunker Bean

Lee Wilson Dodd (July 11, 1879 - May 16, 1933) was an American playwright, poet, novelist and short story writer. Several of his plays were made into films. as well as reviews, and he was also a professor.

== Biography ==
Dodd was born in Franklin, Pennsylvania. He began his career as a lawyer.

Yale University has a collection of his papers.

Several of his works were published in Harper's Magazine. He had a poem published in Poetry, A Magazine of Verse. In 1919, Dodd's novel The Book of Susan was serialized in the Saturday Evening Post.

Dodd rented a camp at the Pocono Lake Preserve for many years, along with Henry Seidel Canby, before becoming one of the founders of the Yelping Hill Association.

Dodd is quoted as having written: "Much that I sought, I could not find; much that I found, I could not bind; much that I bound, I could not free; much that I freed, returned to me."

== Bibliography ==
- The Book of Susan
- His Majesty Bunker Bean, a Comedy in Four Acts and Five Scenes
- A Modern Alchemist, and Other Poems (1906)
- The Middle Miles and Other Poems
- Lilia Chenoworth
- The Book of Susan, a Novel (1920)
- The Golden Complex: A Defence of Inferiority (1927)
- A Garnerof Fugitive Pieces

== Plays ==
- The Return of Eve (1909)
- Speed (1911)
- His Majesty Bunker Bean (1916)
- Pals First (1917)
- The Changelings (1923)
- A Strong Man's House (1929)

== Filmography ==
- The Return of Eve (1916), an adaptation of one of Wilson's plays
- Pals First, a Wilson play adapted into films in 1918 and 1926
- Bunker Bean adapted from Wilson's play that was an adaptation of a Harry Leon Wilson novel
- His Majesty, Bunker Bean (1925 film), also an adaptation of a Wilson 1916 play adapted from a Harry Leon Wilson novel
