= Merton of the Movies (1924 film) =

1924 film by James Cruze

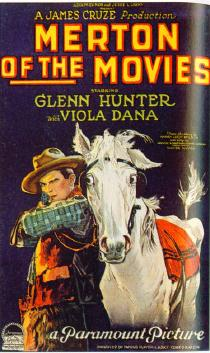
- 1924 movie poster
- Directed by: James Cruze
- Written by: Walter Woods (scenario)
- Based on: 1922 novel Merton of the Movies by Harry Leon Wilson; 1922 play by George S. Kaufman and Marc Connelly
- Produced by: Adolph Zukor; Jesse Lasky
- Starring: Glenn Hunter; Viola Dana
- Cinematography: Karl Brown
- Distributed by: Paramount Pictures
- Release date: November 3, 1924
- Running time: 80 minutes; 8 reels (7,655 feet)
- Country: United States
- Language: Silent (English intertitles)

Merton of the Movies is a 1924 American comedy film directed by James Cruze, written by Walter Woods, and starring Glenn Hunter and Viola Dana. It is based on the George S. Kaufman and Marc Connelly 1922 play of the same name, which in turn was based on Harry Leon Wilson's novel, also titled Merton of the Movies.

Glenn Hunter had originated the role of Merton Gill in the Broadway play and reprised his role in this film. Since the play had depended on funny dialogue, the movie (being silent) was opened up and a good deal of slapstick used instead. Thomas Hischak described the result as "uneven" although "Hunter still pleases and there are some droll performances by the supporting cast".

It was remade in 1932 (as Make Me a Star) and again in 1947.

== Plot ==
Merton is an aspiring actor whose exaggerated overacting brings mirth to film producers who decide to make him act in a comedy, convincing him that he is doing a drama.

== Cast ==
- Glenn Hunter as Merton Gill
- Charles Sellon as Pete Gashwiler
- Sadie Gordon as Mrs. Gaswiler
- Gale Henry as Tessie Kearns
- Luke Cosgrove as Lowell Hardy
- Viola Dana as Sally Montague or 'Flips'
- DeWitt Jennings as Jeff Baird
- Elliott Rothe as Harold Parmalee
- Charles Ogle as Mr. Montague
- Ethel Wales as Mrs. Montague
- Frank Jonasson as Henshaw
- Eleanor Lawson as Mrs. Patterson

== Preservation ==
In February of 2021, Merton of the Movies was cited by the National Film Preservation Board on their Lost U.S. Silent Feature Films list and is therefore presumed lost.

== See also ==
- List of lost films
- Hollywood (1923), a film about movies also directed by James Cruze and also a lost film
