= Merton of the Movies (novel) =

Novel by Harry Leon Wilson

Merton of the Movies is a comic novel by Harry Leon Wilson. It was adapted into a stage play and three films. Wilson, a writer and novelist, wrote the book after a brief stint in Hollywood. Merton of the Movies was published in the Saturday Evening Post in 1919 and published as a book in 1922. Thomas Hischak described Merton of the Movies as a "light-hearted romp" with characters "cartoonish but endearing". According to American novelist Gertrude Stein, Merton of the Movies is "the best description of America that has ever been done". The novel sold millions of copies and has been adapted to other media several times.

== Premise and plot ==
Small-town bumpkin Merton Gill fantasizes about joining the glamorous world of silent films, and takes a correspondence school course in acting. He travels to Hollywood, where he is disillusioned by the foibles of his screen idols. He is befriended by comedienne and stuntwoman Flips Montague, who helps him land a bit part, which he bungles so badly with his comically inept acting that the studio is inspired to use him for comedy. Gill becomes a comedy star, delivering lines that he thinks are serious straight drama.

== Adaptions ==
- Merton of the Movies, a 1922 Broadway play by George S. Kaufmann and Marc Connelly
- Merton of the Movies, a 1924 film, now lost
- Polly of the Movies, a 1927 film with a female protagonist
- Make Me a Star, a 1932 film
- Merton of the Movies, a November 17, 1941 Lux Radio Theatre one-hour radio play, starring Mickey Rooney and Judy Garland
- Merton of the Movies, a 1947 film starring Red Skelton
- Merton of the Movies, a June 20, 1949 Lux Radio Theatre one-hour radio play, starring Mickey Rooney and Arlene Dahl
- Merton of the Movies, a 1977 musical by Gary William Friedman (composer), Robert Lorick (lyrics), and Mel Shapiro and Sam Bobrick (book), which never made Broadway but was produced in 1985 at Carnegie Mellon University.
- Merton of the Movies, a 2011 musical by Donald Brenner and Doug Katsaros which has not been produced but has been stage read
