= His Majesty, Bunker Bean (1925 film) =

1925 film

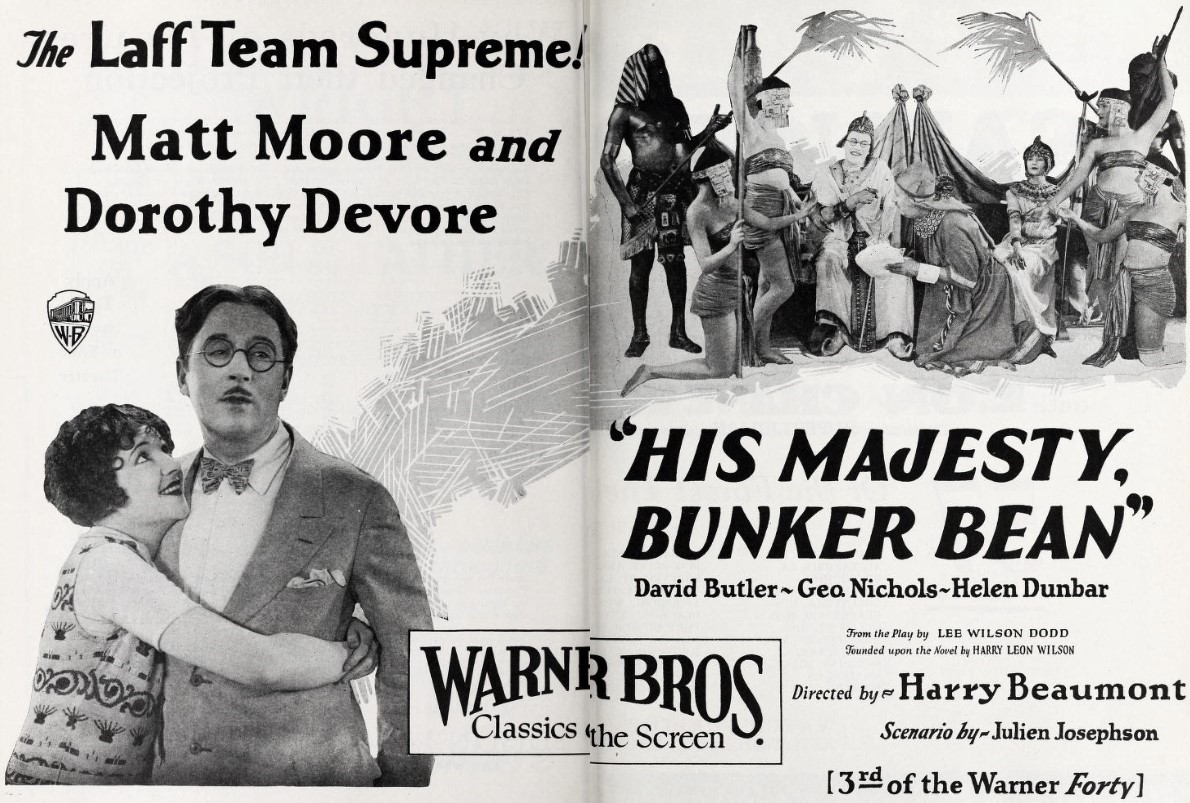
- Advertisement
- Directed by: Harry Beaumont
- Written by: Julien Josephson
- Based on: play, His Majesty Bunker Bean by Lee Wilson Dodd, adapted from a novel Bunker Bean by Harry Leon Wilson
- Produced by: Warner Brothers
- Starring: Matt Moore; Dorothy Devore
- Cinematography: Byron Haskin; Frank Kesson
- Distributed by: Warner Bros.
- Release date: September 19, 1925
- Running time: 8 reels
- Country: United States
- Language: Silent (English intertitles)
- Budget: $84,000
- Box office: $130,000

His Majesty, Bunker Bean is a 1925 American silent comedy film directed by Harry Beaumont and starring Matt Moore. It is based on a 1915 play, His Majesty, Bunker Bean by Lee Wilson Dodd, taken from a novel Bunker Bean by Harry Leon Wilson. It was produced and distributed by Warner Bros.

== Plot ==
As described in a film magazine review, Bunker Bean, who is the stenographer of Jim Breede, a millionaire, is an imaginative youth who is told by a clairvoyant that he is the reincarnation of an Egyptian king. He tries to act the part of the king, and in so doing he fascinates his employer's daughter Marie, who forces from him a promise to marry her. When Bunker learns that after all he is not the king's reincarnation, he is so discouraged that he tells Marie he cannot marry her. His friend Bud Matthews encourages him, however, and all goes well until a fight starts on the day of the wedding. Bunker wins the fight. And he wins Marie's father over by making him spend a large sum of money to secure some stock.

== Cast ==
- Matt Moore as Bunker Bean
- Dorothy Devore as Marie Breede
- David Butler as Bud Matthews
- George Nichols as Jim Breede
- Frank Leigh as Professor Balthasar
- Nora Cecil as Countess Casanova
- Henry A. Barrows as Reginald Larabee
- Gertrude Claire as Grandma Breede
- Lucille Ward as Nurse
- Gayne Whitman as Bert Hollins
- Helen Dunbar as Minor Role

== Box office ==
According to Warner Bros. records, the film earned $105,000 domestically and $25,000 in foreign markets.

== Preservation status ==
An abridged or incomplete print survives.
