= Frederic Rodrigo Gruger =

American illustrator (1871–1953)

- Born: August 2, 1871; Philadelphia, Pennsylvania, U.S.
- Died: March 21, 1953 (aged 81); New York City, New York, U.S.
- Other names: Frederick Rodrigo Gruger, F. R. Gruger
- Occupation(s): Illustrator, drawer, painter

Signature
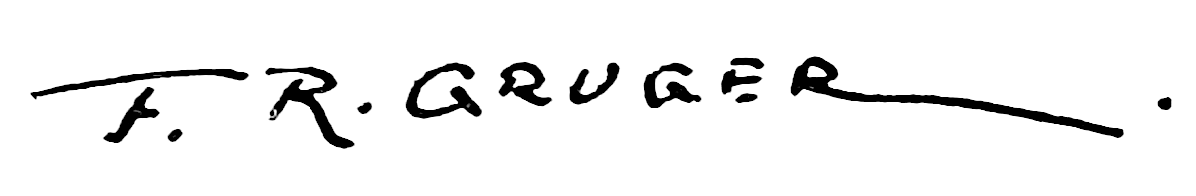

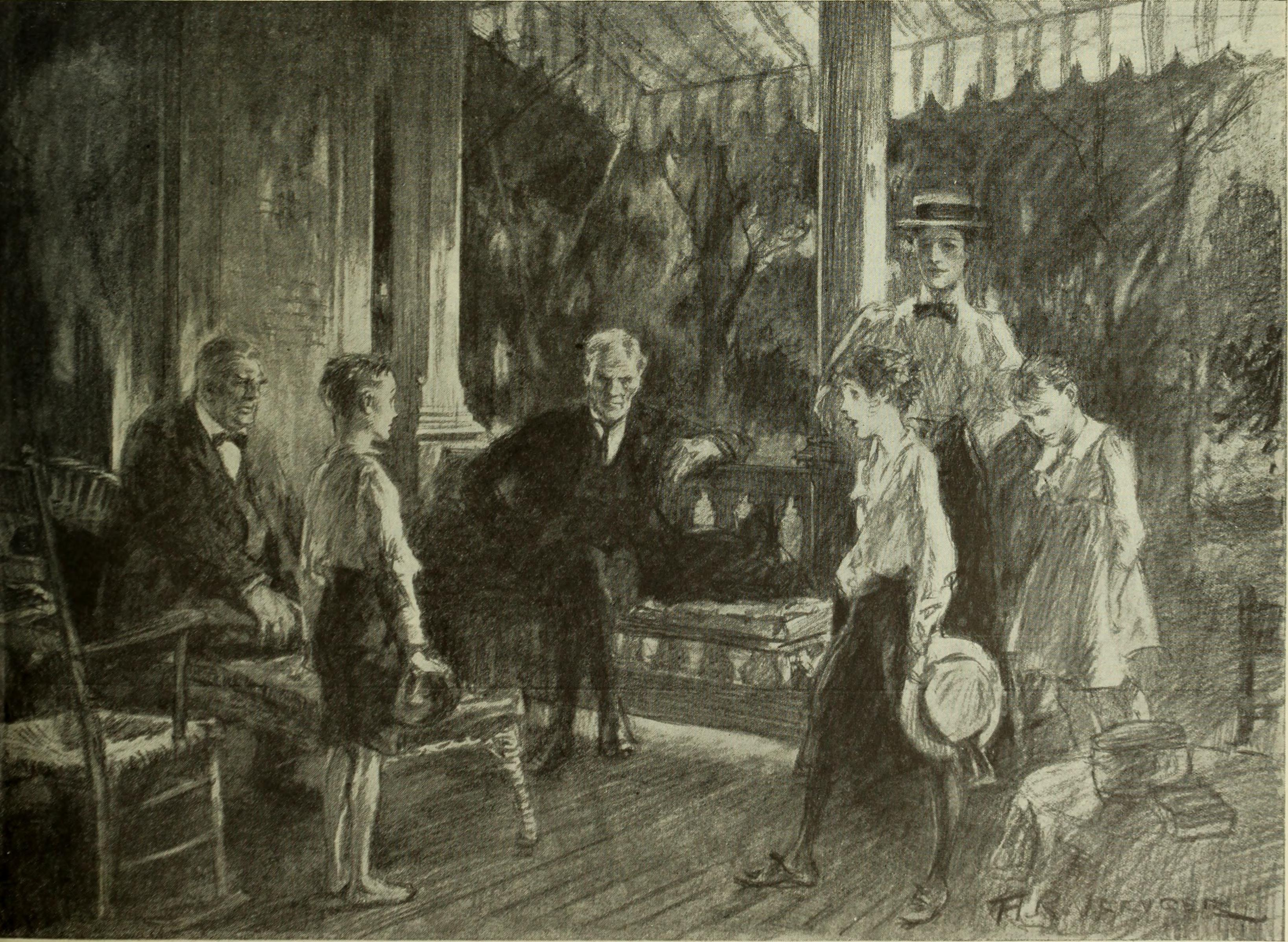
Frederic Rodrigo Gruger illustration, The Saturday Evening Post (1920)

Frederic Rodrigo Gruger (August 2, 1871 – March 21, 1953), also known as F. R. Gruger, was an American illustrator and genre painter. He is best known for his prolific illustration work for The Saturday Evening Post. The School of Gruger is a term used to describe a movement of illustrators and drawers from the late 1920s in Philadelphia, because his work was of great influence.

== Life and career ==
Frederic Rodrigo Gruger was born on August 2, 1871, in Philadelphia. His parents were Rebecca (née Rodrigo) and John Peter Gruger. His younger brother John William Gruger (1874–1934) also worked as an illustrator. Gruger attended high school in Lancaster, Pennsylvania.

He graduated from the Pennsylvania Academy of the Fine Arts, where he studied under Thomas Pollock Anshutz and Henry Joseph Thouron (1851–1915).

From 1898 until the early 1940s, he created over 6,000 illustrations, including 2,700 for The Saturday Evening Post. At the height of his career he lived in Avon, New Jersey and had an art studio in New York City.

== Death and legacy ==
Gruger died on March 21, 1953, in New York City.

The Frederic Rodrigo Gruger collection can be found at the Archives at Yale, at Yale University. In 1981, he posthumously was entered into the Society of Illustrators' Hall of Fame.

== Collections ==
Gruger's artwork can be found in museum collections, including at the Rhode Island School of Design Museum in Providence, Rhode Island; the Brandywine Museum of Art in Chadds Ford, Pennsylvania; the Syracuse University Art Museum in Syracuse, New York; the University Art Museum at New Mexico State University in Las Cruces, New Mexico; the Delaware Art Museum in Wilmington, Delaware; and the Spencer Museum of Art in Lawrence, Kansas.
