= Merton of the Movies (1947 film) =

1947 film by Robert Alton

- Directed by: Robert Alton
- Screenplay by: George Wells; Lou Breslow
- Based on: Merton of the Movies 1922 novel by Harry Leon Wilson; Merton of the Movies 1922 play by George S. Kaufman Marc Connelly
- Produced by: Albert Lewis
- Starring: Red Skelton; Virginia O'Brien; Leon Ames; Gloria Grahame; Alan Mowbray
- Cinematography: Paul C. Vogel
- Edited by: Frank E. Hull
- Music by: David Snell
- Production company: Metro-Goldwyn-Mayer
- Distributed by: Loew's Inc.
- Release date: October 11, 1947
- Running time: 82 minutes
- Country: United States
- Language: English
- Budget: $1,504,000
- Box office: $1,712,000

Merton of the Movies is a 1947 American comedy film, based on the 1922 novel of the same name written by Harry Leon Wilson, and the play of the same name written by George S. Kaufmann and Marc Connelly, which opened on Broadway in 1922. It was previously adapted as a 1924 silent film and as the 1932 film Make Me a Star. The 1947 version stars Red Skelton and is directed by choreographer Robert Alton in his directorial debut.

== Cast ==
- Red Skelton as Merton Gill aka Clifford Armytage
- Virginia O'Brien as Phyllis Montague
- Gloria Grahame as Beulah Baxter
- Leon Ames as Lawrence Rupert
- Alan Mowbray as Frank Mulvaney
- Charles D. Brown as Jeff Baird
- Hugo Haas as Von Strutt
- Harry Hayden as Mr. Gashwiler
- Tom Trout as Marty
- Douglas Fowley as Phil
- Dick Wessel as Chick
- Gordon Richards as Kristen, Beulah's Butler

== Production ==
Due to negative reception from sneak preview audiences, extensive reshoots were required before a widespread release.

== Reception ==
According to MGM records the movie earned $1,274,000 in the US and Canada and $438,000 elsewhere, making a loss to the studio of $367,000.

== Comic book adaptation ==
- Fiction House Movie Comics #4 (1947)
