= Cort Theatre (Chicago) =

Coordinates: 41.8827°N 87.6296°W

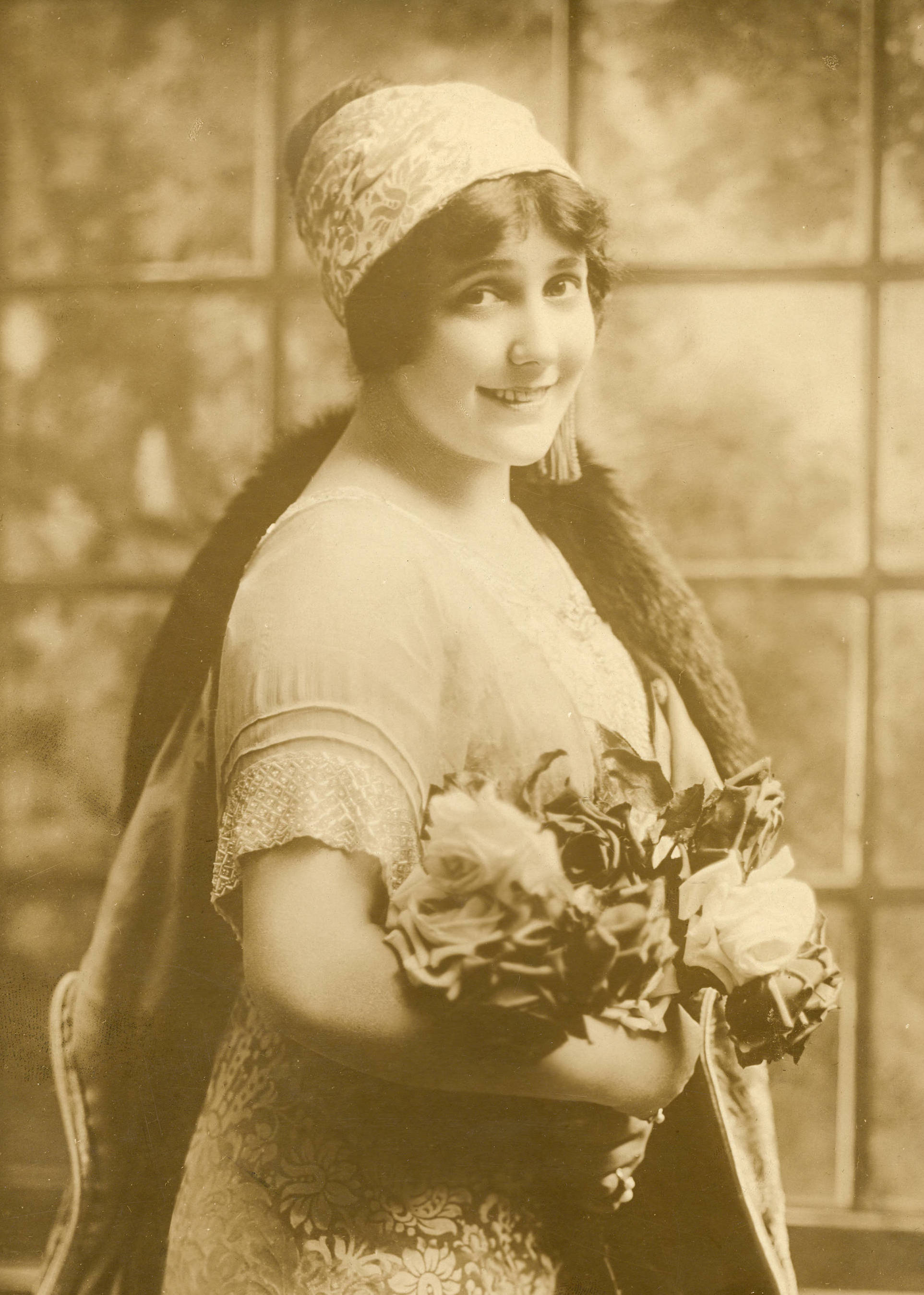
Actress Amelia Stone who led the cast that inaugurated the Cort Theatre in 1909.

The Cort Theatre was a theatre located in Chicago, Illinois at 126-132 North Dearborn Street. It was designed by architect J. E. O. Pridmore. The theatre seated 949 people. It was razed in 1934.

Pridmore based his architecture on the amphitheaters of the ancient world, and incorporated images of hanging vines, and a ceiling with a painted sky of a moon and stars into his design. The theatre's curtain contained a painted picture of a Greek theatre in Sicily; possibly modeled after the Ancient theatre of Taormina. The Chicago Evening American stated that the "whole effect is one of being outdoors with a warm Italian sky overhead." The theatre's interior inspired similar architectural designs in theaters internationally. Boxoffice magazine stated in 1937 that Pridmore "is internationally known as the father of the atmospheric theatre, having originated the star and sky effect in the Cort Theatre, Chicago, which has been copied extensively the world over."

The Cort Theatre opened on October 25, 1909, with a performance of Harry Von Tilzer, Vincent Bryan, and Stanislaus Stange's operetta The Kissing Girl with the actress Amelia Stone in the title role. In its later year it operated as a movie theatre.
