= Harry Leon Wilson =

American novelist (1867–1939)

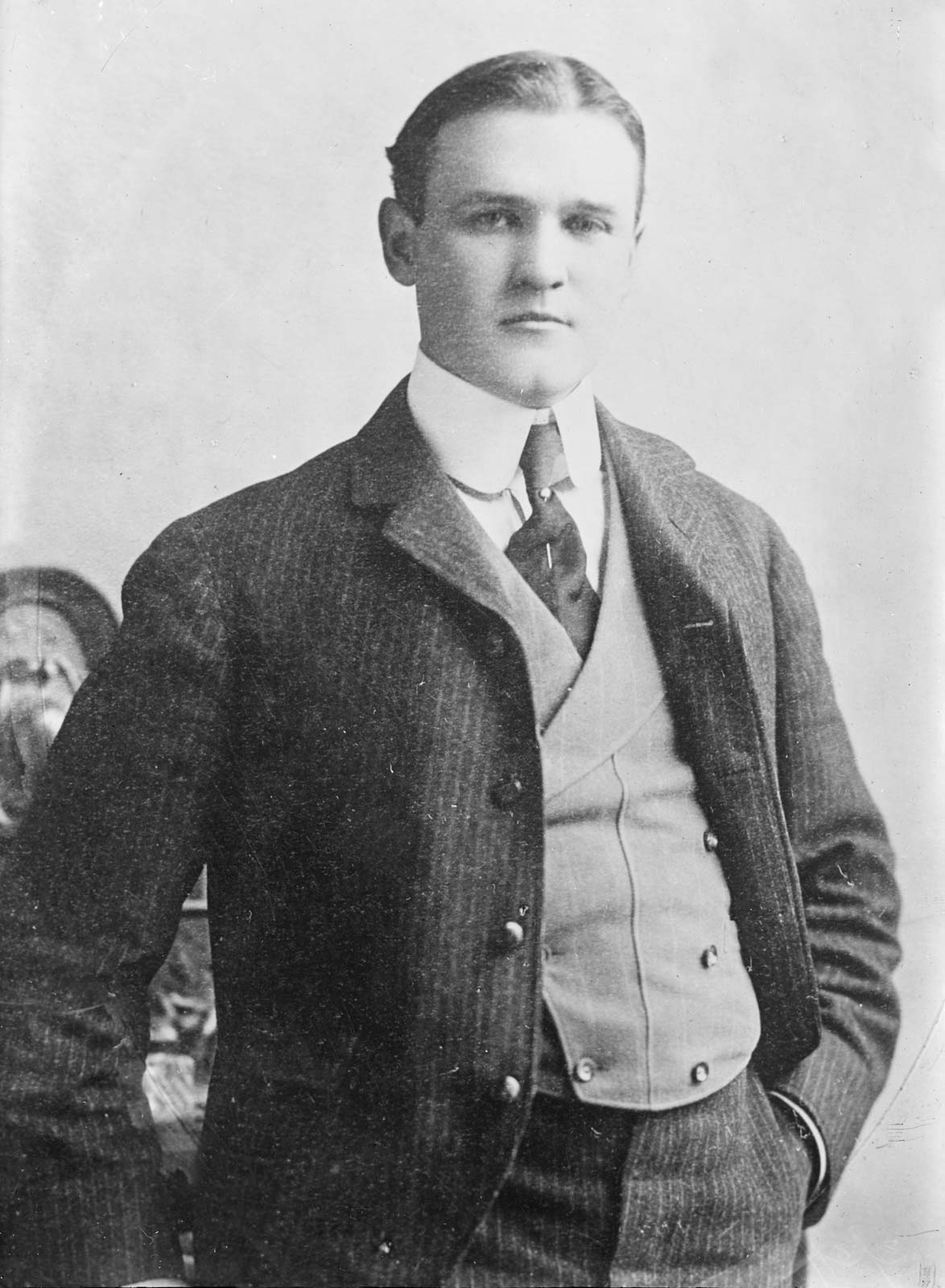
- Born: May 1, 1867; Oregon, Illinois, U.S.
- Died: June 28, 1939 (aged 72); Carmel, California, U.S.
- Occupations: Novelist, dramatist
- Years active: 1886–1939
- Spouse(s): Wilbertine Nesselrode Teters (m. 1898–1900); Rose O'Neill (m. 1902–1907); Helen MacGowan Cooke (m. 1912–1927)

Harry Leon Wilson (May 1, 1867 – June 28, 1939) was an American novelist and dramatist best known for his novels Ruggles of Red Gap and Merton of the Movies. Another of his works, Bunker Bean, helped popularize the term "flapper". It was adapted into a play and film. Several of his other novels were also adapted to film, some more than once.

== Early life ==
Harry Leon Wilson was born in Oregon, Illinois to Samuel and Adeline (née Kidder). His father was a newspaper publisher, and Harry learned to set type at an early age. He went to public schools and enjoyed reading Bret Harte and Mark Twain. He learned shorthand and secretarial skills.

== Biography and career ==
Wilson left home at 16 and worked for the Union Pacific Railroad as a stenographer in Topeka, Kansas, Omaha, Nebraska, Denver, Colorado, and eventually he came to California in 1887. He was a contributor to the histories of Hubert Howe Bancroft, and became the private secretary to Virgil Bogue.

In December 1886, Wilson's story "The Elusive Dollar Bill" was accepted by Puck magazine. He continued to contribute to Puck and became assistant editor in 1892. Henry Cuyler Bunner died in 1896 and Wilson replaced him as editor.

Wilson's first wife was Wilbertine Nesselrode Teters Worden, whom he married in 1898. The marriage ended in divorce in 1900. In 1902, he married Rose Cecil O'Neill Latham. O'Neill and Wilson worked together at Puck, and she was the illustrator for four of his books; they divorced in 1907. Wilson's black and white pit bull dog named Sprangle was the inspiration for Rose O'Neill's biscuit porcelain Kewpie dog figure, known to the world as "Kewpiedoodle dog" and sold worldwide by importer George Borgfeldt.

The publication of The Spenders allowed Wilson to quit Puck in 1902 and devote himself full-time to writing.

I had to live ten years in New York. It was then a simple town, with few street lights north of Forty-second street. Now the place is pretty terrible to me, perhaps the ugliest city in the world. I decided that the only way to get out of New York was to write a successful novel. So I tried with The Spenders and when I got a substantial advance from publishers, I quit my job and beat it for the high hills of Colorado.

—Harry Leon Wilson

Wilson returned to New York where he met Booth Tarkington in 1904. Tarkington and Wilson traveled together to Europe in 1905. The two completed the play The Man from Home in 1906 in Paris. Wilson was elected to the National Institute of Arts and Letters in 1908.

Wilson returned from Europe and settled permanently into the Bohemian colony at Carmel-by-the-Sea, California in 1910, which included Jack London, Mary Hunter Austin, George Sterling, Upton Sinclair, Xavier Martinez, Ambrose Bierce, Alice MacGowan, Sinclair Lewis, Francis McComas, and Arnold Genthe. It was during this period that Wilson wrote the books for which he is best known: Bunker Bean (1913) and Ruggles of Red Gap (1915).

In 1912, Wilson married Helen MacGowan Cooke, the daughter of Grace MacGowan Cooke and the niece of Alice MacGowan. Wilson moved from Carmel to Carmel Highlands where he built a home he called "The Ocean Home." The home had 12 rooms on 8 acres (3.2 ha) of land and was completed in 1912. The couple had two children, Harry Leon Wilson Jr. in 1913 and Charis Wilson in 1914.

In 1914, someone attempted to murder Alice MacGowan by poison and to steal her diamonds and cash; Wilson and writer Jimmy Hopper became amateur detectives, but the perpetrator was never discovered.

After a brief stint in Hollywood, Wilson wrote Merton of the Movies in 1922.

In March 1922, Wilson fought and lost a highly publicized "duel of fists" with landscape painter Theodore Morrow Criley. Details of their long-standing feud made banner headlines in the San Francisco press and were given prominent coverage across the country on the International News Wire, including stories in the Los Angeles Times and New York Times. It was revealed that their argument originated with "a light romantic" love scene between Criley and Wilson's wife in the 1921 production of Pomander Walk at Carmel's Forest Theatre. Wilson sent Criley a series of accusatory letters, including a 24-page invective, and demanded satisfaction in this "affair of honor". He spent three months in Honolulu undergoing physical training and instruction in boxing, then he returned and the two men met on "a high cliff overlooking the sea". Criley thrashed Wilson in ten minutes.

Sade's in the Court of the Golden Bough Theater.

In 1925, Wilson built a two-story commercial building for Helen, who ran a flower shop called the Bloomin' Basement. It was in front of the two-story Golden Bough Theater on Ocean Avenue in downtown Carmel. It later became a popular Bohemian bar and restaurant, Sade's. Wilson and Cooke divorced in 1927.

== Later life and death ==
A severe auto accident in 1932 greatly affected Wilson's health during his remaining years. He died of a brain hemorrhage on June 28, 1939, while residing with friends at Carmel Point. He was 72 years of age.

== See also ==
- Booth Tarkington

== Bibliography ==
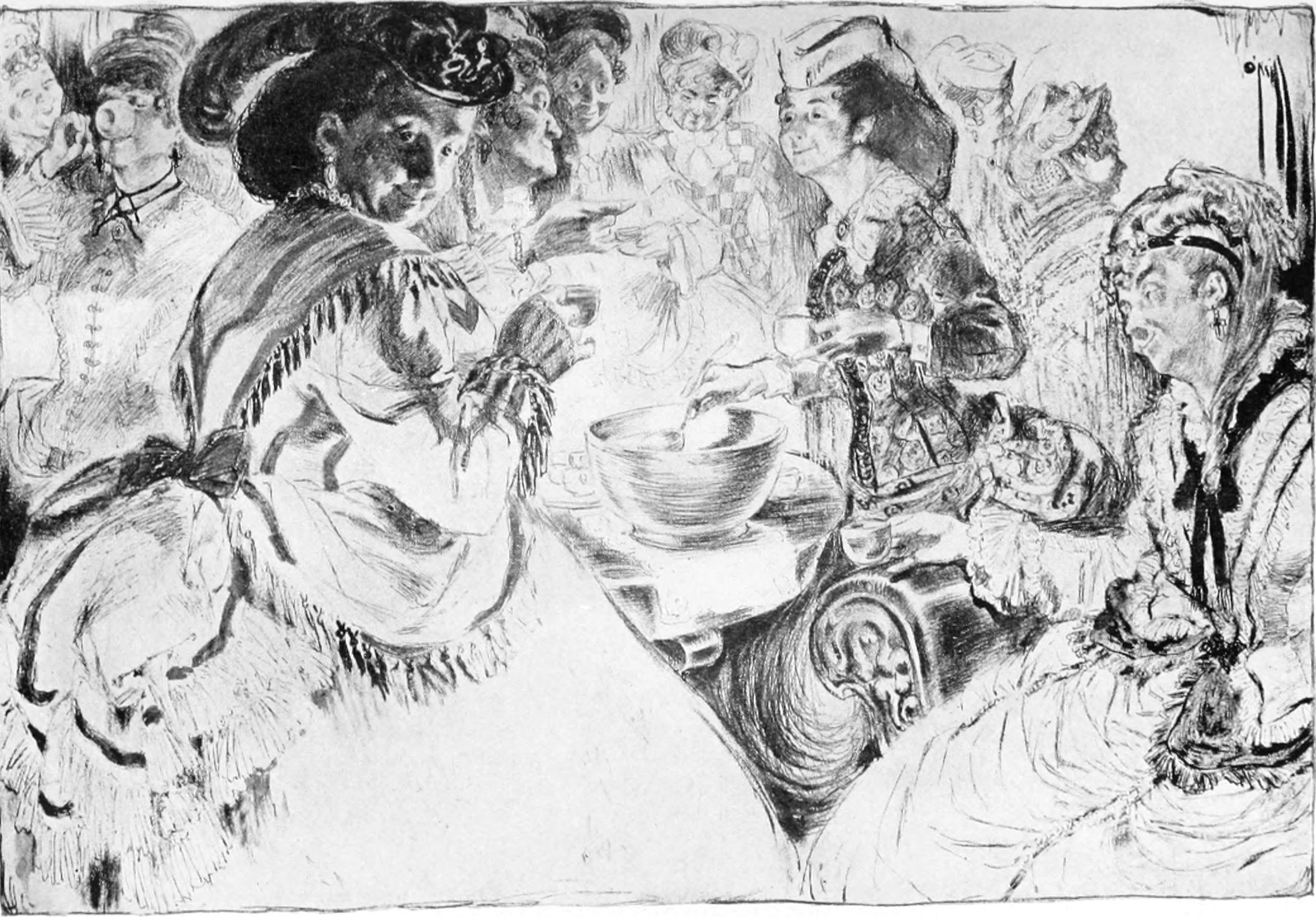
Illustration in The Boss of Little Arcady (1905) by Rose Cecil O'Neill

- Zigzag Tales from the East to the West (1894)
- The Spenders: A Tale of the Third Generation (1902) illustrated by Rose Cecil O'Neill; adapted into the 1921 film The Spenders.
- The Lions of the Lord, a Tale of the Old West (1903) illustrated by Rose Cecil O'Neill
- The Seeker (1904) illustrated by Rose Cecil O'Neill
- The Boss of Little Arcady (1905) illustrated by Rose Cecil O'Neill
- Ewing's Lady (1907)
- The Man from Home (1908) co-written with Booth Tarkington; adapted into two films, The Man from Home (1914) and The Man from Home (1922).
- Cameo Kirby (1908) co-written with Booth Tarkington; adapted into three films, Cameo Kirby (1914), Cameo Kirby (1923) and Cameo Kirby (1930).
- Foreign Exchange (1909) co-written with Booth Tarkington
- Springtime (1909) co-written with Booth Tarkington; adapted into the 1914 film Springtime.
- If I Had Money (1909) co-written with Booth Tarkington
- Your Humble Servant (1910) co-written with Booth Tarkington
- Bunker Bean (originally published in 1912 as a serialized novel with the title His Majesty Bunker Bean in The Saturday Evening Post; published in book form as Bunker Bean by Doubleday in 1913) illustrated by Frederic R. Gruger; adapted into three films, His Majesty, Bunker Bean (1918), His Majesty, Bunker Bean (1925) and Bunker Bean (1936).
- Ruggles of Red Gap (1915) illustrated by Frederic R. Gruger; adapted into four films, Ruggles of Red Gap (1918), Ruggles of Red Gap (1923), Ruggles of Red Gap (1935) and Fancy Pants (1950).
- The Man from Home: A Novel (1915) based on the play
- Somewhere in Red Gap (1916) illustrated by John R. Neill
- Life (1919) play
- The Gibson Upright (1919) co-written with Booth Tarkington
- Ma Pettengill (1919)
- The Wrong Twin (1921) illustrated by Frederic R. Gruger
- Merton of the Movies (1922) adapted into three films, Merton of the Movies (1924), Make Me a Star (1932), and Merton of the Movies (1947)
- So This Is Golf! 1923)
- Oh, Doctor! (1923) adapted into the two films, Oh Doctor! (1925) and Oh, Doctor (1937).
- Ma Pettengill Talks (1923)
- Professor How Could You! (1924)
- Tweedles (1924) co-written with Booth Tarkington
- Cousin Jane (1925)
- Lone Tree (1929)
- How's Your Health? (1930) co-written with Booth Tarkington
- Two Black Sheep (1931)
- When in the Course-- (1940)
