= Pallas Pictures =

American film producer

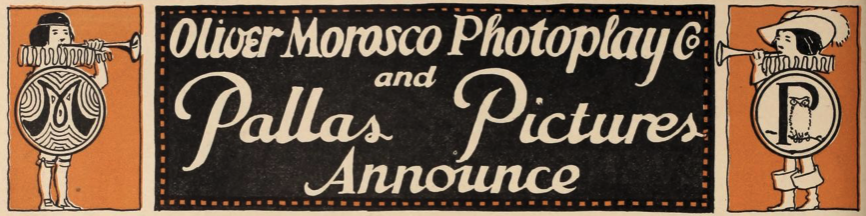
Joint advertising banner for the Morosco and Pallas movie production companies.

Pallas Pictures (1915-1918) was a film studio in the U.S. headed by Frank A. Garbutt.

== History ==
In 1913 the film production company Bosworth Incorporated was founded to release film adaptations of Jack London's stories. Hobart Bosworth was president of the company but as Jack London wrote, "Mr. Garbutt has absolute charge of the entire business of Bosworth, Inc." The company rented studio space until September 1914 when Bosworth Inc. constructed its own studio at 211 N. Occidental Blvd., Los Angeles. When Hobart Bosworth left in 1915 Garbutt assumed full control of Bosworth Inc. Several months later the company was renamed Pallas Pictures, with Melodile Garbutt (Frank A. Garbutt's daughter) listed as president of Pallas Pictures. The Pallas logo was a capital "P" with an owl on a branch.

Pallas and the Oliver Morosco Photoplay Company were associated and produced films at the same studio, with completed films distributed and advertised by Paramount Pictures. In 1916 Pallas and Morosco became part of Famous Players–Lasky, with Frank A. Garbutt representing both Pallas and Morosco during the FP-L merger negotiations. The Pallas brand was discontinued early in 1918.

Charles Eyton was manager of the Pallas-Morosco studio. Directors for Pallas included William Desmond Taylor, Frank Lloyd, Donald Crisp, and Julia Crawford Ivers; Ivers also wrote over a dozen scenarios used for Pallas productions. Leading Pallas actors included Lenore Ulrich, Dustin Farnum, Vivian Martin, and George Beban. Pete Smith was a publicist for Pallas-Morosco.

== Filmography ==
- The Gentleman from Indiana (1915)
- The Reform Candidate (1915)
- Davy Crockett (1916 film)
- The Intrigue (1916), extant
- A Son of Erin (1916)
- The American Beauty (1916)
- The Call of the Cumberlands (1916)
- David Garrick (1916 film)
- Ben Blair (film) (1916)
- He Fell in Love with His Wife (1916)
- The Parson of Panamint (1916)
- The Right Direction (1916)
- The Heart of Paula (1916)
- The Parson of Panamint (1916 film)
- The Wax Model (1917)
- Lost in Transit (1917 film)
- The Spirit of Romance (film) (1917)
- Molly Entangled (1917)
- As Men Love (1917)
- The Trouble Buster (1917)
- Her Own People (1917)
- The Fair Barbarian (1917)
- A Kiss for Susie (1917)
- The Bond Between (1917)
- A Roadside Impresario (1917)
- The Lonesome Chap (1917)
- Little Miss Optimist (1917)
- The Heir of the Ages (1917)
- A Petticoat Pilot (1918)
