= The Parson of Panamint =

The Parson of Panamint is the title of two films based on the 1915 short story of the same name by Peter B. Kyne:

- The Parson of Panamint (1916 film), a lost Western film
- The Parson of Panamint (1941 film), a drama starring Charlie Ruggles
