= The Other Man (1916 film) =

1916 film

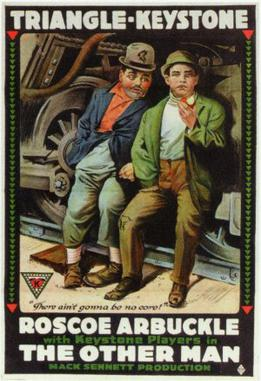
- Theatrical release poster
- Directed by: Mack Sennett
- Produced by: Mack Sennett
- Starring: Roscoe Arbuckle; Irene Wallace; Charles Avery
- Production company: Keystone Film Company
- Distributed by: Triangle Distributing
- Release date: April 16, 1916
- Running time: 20 minutes
- Country: United States
- Languages: Silent; English intertitles

The Other Man is a 1916 American silent short comedy film starring Fatty Arbuckle. The film was shot in Fort Lee, New Jersey.

== Cast ==
- Roscoe "Fatty" Arbuckle as Fatty
- Irene Wallace as Fatty's Fiancée
- Charles Avery
- Joe Bordeaux
- Minta Durfee
- Horace Haine
- William Jefferson
- Leatrice Joy
- Lillian Shaffner
- Al St. John
