= Snowdrift (film) =

1923 film

- Directed by: Scott R. Dunlap
- Screenplay by: John Stone
- Based on: Snowdrift by James Hendryx
- Starring: Buck Jones; Bert Sprotte; Gertrude Ryan; Colin Chase; Evelyn Selbie; Annette Jean
- Cinematography: George Schneiderman
- Production company: Fox Film Corporation
- Distributed by: Fox Film Corporation
- Release date: April 22, 1923
- Running time: 50 minutes
- Country: United States
- Language: English

Snowdrift is a 1923 American action film directed by Scott R. Dunlap and written by John Stone. It is based on the 1922 novel Snowdrift by James Hendryx. The film stars Buck Jones, Bert Sprotte, Gertrude Ryan, Colin Chase, Evelyn Selbie and Annette Jean. The film was released on April 22, 1923, by Fox Film Corporation.

== Cast ==
- Buck Jones as Carter Brent
- Bert Sprotte as Jean McLaire
- Gertrude Ryan as Margot McFarlane
- Colin Chase as Murdo McFarlane
- Evelyn Selbie as Wananebish
- Annette Jean as Little Jean
- Irene Rich as Kitty
- G. Raymond Nye as Johnnie Claw
- Dorothy Manners as Snowdrift
- Lalo Encinas as Joe Pete
- Lee Shumway as John Reeves
- C.E. Anderson as Trapper
- Bret Black as kid (uncredited)

== Preservation ==
With no prints of Snowdrift located in any film archives, it is considered a lost film.
