= Her Own People =

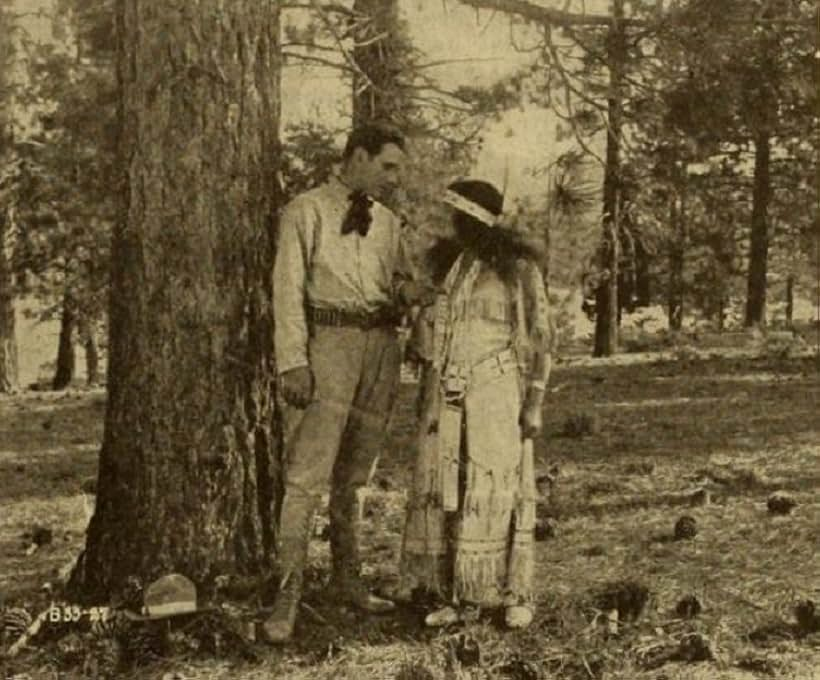
- Directed by: Scott Sidney
- Screenplay by: Gardner Hunting; Julia Crawford Ivers
- Starring: Lenore Ulric; Colin Chase; Howard Davies; Adelaide Woods; Jack Stark; Gail Brooks
- Cinematography: James Van Trees
- Production company: Pallas Pictures
- Distributed by: Paramount Pictures
- Release date: February 8, 1917
- Running time: 50 minutes
- Country: United States
- Language: English

Her Own People is a 1917 American drama silent film directed by Scott Sidney and written by Gardner Hunting and Julia Crawford Ivers. The film stars Lenore Ulric, Colin Chase, Howard Davies, Adelaide Woods, Jack Stark and Gail Brooks. The film was released on February 8, 1917, by Paramount Pictures.

== Cast ==
- Lenore Ulric as Alona
- Colin Chase as Frank Colvin
- Howard Davies as John Kemp
- Adelaide Woods as Eleanor Dutton
- Jack Stark as Jimmie Pope
- Gail Brooks as Morning Star
- Joy Lewis as Myra Agnew
- William Jefferson (actor) as Blinn Agnew
- Ada Lewis as Mrs. Colvin
- Mary Mersch as Katherine Colvin
- William Steele as Pölsa Kar
