= The Wax Model =

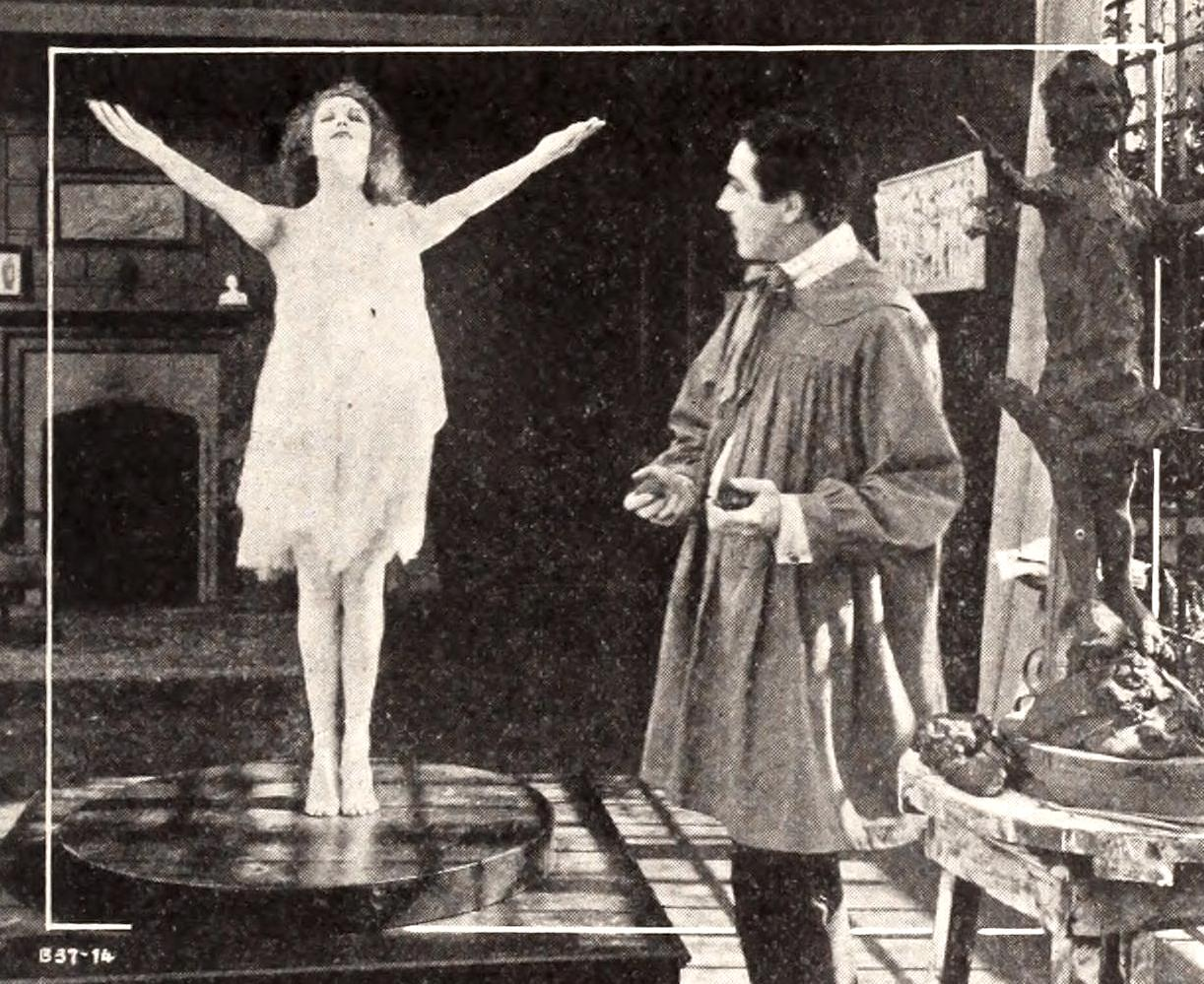
- Publicity photo
- Directed by: E. Mason Hopper
- Screenplay by: Julia Crawford Ivers
- Starring: Vivian Martin; Thomas Holding; George Fisher; Helen Jerome Eddy; Clarissa Selwynne; Katherine Vaughn
- Cinematography: James Van Trees
- Production company: Pallas Pictures
- Distributed by: Paramount Pictures
- Release date: February 1, 1917
- Running time: 50 minutes
- Country: United States
- Language: English

The Wax Model is a lost 1917 American drama silent film directed by E. Mason Hopper and written by Julia Crawford Ivers. The film stars Vivian Martin, Thomas Holding, George Fisher, Helen Jerome Eddy, Clarissa Selwynne and Katherine Vaughn. The film was released on February 1, 1917, by Paramount Pictures.

== Cast ==
- Vivian Martin as Mulie Davenant
- Thomas Holding as Melville Ilchester
- George Fisher as John Ramsey
- Helen Jerome Eddy as Helen Ilchester
- Clarissa Selwynne as Julie's Mother
- Katherine Vaughn as Mrs. Ramsey
- Pietro Buzzi as Hermineux
- Marion Sievers as Julie's Mother
