= Paul Willis (actor) =

American actor

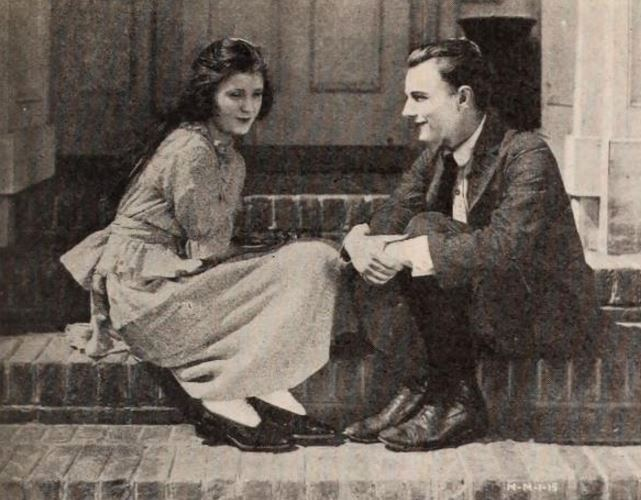
- Mae Marsh and Paul Willis in Nobody's Kid (1921).
- Born: Spencer Paul Gregory; April 9, 1900; Chicago, Illinois
- Died: November 3, 1960 (aged 60); Los Angeles, California
- Other names: Paul Gregory Willis

Paul Gregory Willis (born Spencer Paul Gregory; April 9, 1900 – November 3, 1960) was an American actor of the silent film era.

== Biography ==
Born in Chicago, Illinois, the son of Spencer Orville Gregory and Cora Ryer Lee, Willis began his career as a child actor in the 1910s, making his screen debut for Vitagraph Studios at the age of thirteen in the title role of the 1913 drama-short Little Kaintuck. He would go on to play a variety of juvenile roles, often opposite child actress Mildred Harris. One notable film starring Willis was the 1914 comedy-short Bill Goes in Business for Himself, directed by Edward Dillon and supervised by D. W. Griffith, whose cast also featured future film director Tod Browning. Willis's breakthrough performance came with his feature film debut in the 1916 screen adaptation of James B. Hendryx's novel, The Promise. The following year, he appeared opposite popular onscreen duo Harold Lockwood and May Allison in the romantic drama The Promise.

Through the 1910s and into the 1920s, Paul Willis would appear opposite such actors as Carmel Myers, Lester Cuneo, Broncho Billy Anderson and Mae Marsh.

Willis is possibly best recalled for his portrayal of Dickon Sowerby in the 1919 Gustav von Seyffertitz-directed film adaptation of the Frances Hodgson Burnett novel The Secret Garden for the Famous Players–Lasky Corporation, in which he appeared opposite actors Lila Lee, Richard Rosson and Spottiswoode Aitken. The film is now considered lost. In December of that year, Motion Picture News reported that Wallis and actress Molly Malone had been signed by Robertson-Cole to appear in the company's Supreme Comedies series.

Paul Willis, who has made good in the heavier side of screen dramatics, believes he is better suited for the comedy and has now become a full-fledged fun producer. The rising young star has played juvenile leads with the best stars in the country. [...] Scott Sidney, director of many of the Robertson-Cole comedy successes, will be in charge of the latest acquisition to the comedy-producing forces.

Within three months, Willis had been added to the cast of fellow recent acquisition Mae Marsh's upcoming Robertson-Cole debut, Nobody's Kid, adapted from Kate Langley Bosher's popular 1910 novel, Mary Cary, Frequently Martha. In 1921, Willis appeared as himself alongside Pauline Curley in the promotional film, Paul's Picnic Party on Pickering Pleasure Pier, which was both filmed and screened at the aforementioned Pier, in Ocean Park, California.

Willis retired from acting at age 23. His final film appearance was in the 1923 Tom Forman-directed drama Money! Money! Money!, opposite Katherine MacDonald and Carl Stockdale.

Willis died at the age of 60 in Los Angeles, California in 1960.

== Partial filmography ==
- Little Kaintuck (1913, Short) - Little Kaintuck
- The Brute (1914, Short) - Ted Barton - Black's Son
- Johanna, the Barbarian (1914, Short) - George - Johanna's Son
- The Poor Folks' Boy (1914, Short) - Benny Benson
- The Milkfed Boy (1914, Short) - The Widow's Milkfed Boy
- Bill Goes in Business for Himself (1914, Short) - Bill's Other Friend
- The Little Matchmaker (1915, Short) - Paul
- A Man for All That (1915, Short) - The Young Boy
- The Little Soldier Man (1915, Short) - Paul
- A Rightful Theft (1915, Short) - Paul Brown - the Widow's Son
- The Old Batch (1915, Short) - Johnny - the Adopted Son
- The Little Lumberjack (1915, Short) - Paul - the Little Lumberjack
- The Indian Trapper's Vindication (1915, Short) - Arnold King - their Son
- Could a Man Do More? (1915, Short) - Richard Sherwood
- The Fall of a Nation (1916) - Billy
- The Promise (1917) - Charlie Manton
- The Haunted Pajamas (1917) - Francis Billings
- The Trouble Buster (1917) - 'Blackie' Moyle
- Shootin' Mad (1918)
- The Secret Garden (1919) - Dickon Sowerby
- The Son-of-a-Gun (1919) - Buddy Brown
- The Cry of the Weak (1919) - Budd
- Nobody's Kid (1921) - John Maxwell
- Thunderclap (1921) - Tommy
- Money! Money! Money! (1923) - Lennie Hobbs (final film role)

== Bibliography ==
- John Holmstrom, The Moving Picture Boy: An International Encyclopaedia from 1895 to 1995, Norwich, Michael Russell, 1996, p. 19.
