= The Promise (1917 film) =

- Directed by: Jay Hunt
- Written by: James B. Hendryx (novel); Richard V. Spencer; Fred J. Balshofer
- Produced by: Fred J. Balshofer
- Starring: Harold Lockwood; May Allison; Lester Cuneo
- Cinematography: Tony Gaudio
- Production company: Yorke Film Corporation
- Distributed by: Metro Pictures
- Release date: February 19, 1917
- Running time: 50 minutes
- Country: United States
- Languages: Silent; English intertitles

The Promise is a 1917 American silent drama film directed by Jay Hunt and starring Harold Lockwood, May Allison and Lester Cuneo.

== Cast ==
- Harold Lockwood as Bill Carmody
- May Allison as Ethel Manton
- Lester Cuneo as Buck Moncrossen
- Paul Willis as Charlie Manton
- Lillian Hayward as Mrs. Appleton
- W.H. Bainbridge as D.S. Appleton
- George Fisher as St. Ledger
- Leota Lorraine as Miss Baker
- John Steppling as Fallon
- Gibson Gowland as Stromberg

== Bibliography ==
- Robert B. Connelly. The Silents: Silent Feature Films, 1910-36, Volume 40, Issue 2. December Press, 1998.
