= Mary Mersch =

American actress (1887–1956)

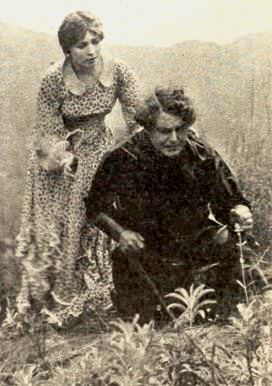
- Mersch with William Farnum in Riders of the Purple Sage
- Born: January 4, 1887; Los Angeles, California, U.S.
- Died: February 26, 1956 (aged 69); Los Angeles, California, U.S.
- Occupation: Actress
- Years active: 1916–1938
- Spouse: Tom Forman (divorced 1923)
- Children: 1

Mary Mersch (January 4, 1887 – February 26, 1956), sometimes credited as May Mersch, was an American actress active from the silent era up to 1938. She was under contract with Fox, and often worked with directors like William Farnum and Frank Lloyd.

== Biography ==
Mary was born in Los Angeles, California, to Theodore Mersch and Clara Dominguez. She began her acting career on the stage in New York City with May Robson and the Manhattan Players, appearing in plays like Martha-by-the-Day. She was married for a time to actor-director Tom Forman; the couple — who had a son together — divorced in 1923.

== Selected filmography ==
- Squadron of Honor (1938)
- Wells Fargo (1937)
- Counterfeit Lady (1936)
- Empty Saddles (1936)
- Star for a Night (1936)
- The Cowboy and the Kid (1936)
- Song of the Saddle (1936)
- Ever Since Eve (1934)
- The Top of the World (1925)
- The Whispered Name (1924)
- The Rainbow Trail (1918)
- Riders of the Purple Sage (1918)
- The Claw (1918)
- A Mother's Secret (1918)
- Blue Blood (1918)
- Who Killed Walton? (1918)
- Rimrock Jones (1918)
- The Trouble Buster (1917)
- One of Many (1917)
- Her Own People (1917)
- Common Ground (1916)
- The Dream Girl (1916)
- The Making of Maddalena (1916)
- David Garrick (1916)
