= Mary Lerner =

Mary Lerner (July 22, 1882 – April 28, 1938) was an American writer who had a brief career writing short stories. She published at least 14 stories in national magazines — including McCall's, Collier's, and Harper's Bazaar — between 1914 and 1919.

== Early life ==
Mary Lerner was the daughter of an Irish-immigrant mother and a German-immigrant father who operated a boarding house in Cambridge, Massachusetts. She attended Radcliffe College, serving as a business editor of The Radcliffe Magazine and contributing some of her own creative writing in her senior year. After her graduation with honors in 1904, she worked as a public school teacher for a time while she began submitting her stories for publication.

== Career ==
Her 1916 story “Little Selves,” published in the September issue of Atlantic Monthly, was chosen by editor Edward J. O’Brien for The Twenty Best American Short Stories for 1916. O’Brien wrote: “Little Selves” by Mary Lerner is little more than a succession of dream pictures portrayed as they cross the consciousness of an old woman who has lived well and is dying happily. But these pictures are so delicately woven, and so tenderly touched with beauty, that they will not easily be forgotten. I am tempted to say that a success such as this could not be repeated. It is a happy accident.”

Although she drew upon memories of her Irish immigrant mother and a friend from the old country for the details, "Little Selves" was a carefully crafted story, as Blanche Colton Williams learned when she interviewed Lerner for her 1919 educational textbook. Although the material "came ready to [her] hand," Lerner told Williams, she "cast it in the most dramatic form possible" She told Williams that "theme usually dominates" in her work; a story is based on "some idea" she wishes "to expound." With publications in some of the most successful American magazines during the previous decade, Lerner considered herself a professional writer, listing her job as “authoress” and her occupation as “literature” for the 1920 census.

Lerner stopped writing sometime during the 1920s; she reported in her Radcliffe 25th reunion report in 1929 that she had not written for some years owing to an injury received from a fall. She married Walter Miller on May 27, 1933, and a report of her death April 28, 1938, appears in Radcliffe's 50th reunion report.

According to The Writer, Lerner published stories in the American Magazine, Munsey’s, Holland’s Magazine, and Young’s Magazine, as reported in their column “Writers of the Day”. Her 1917 story “Forsaking All Others,” published in Collier’s Weekly, was adapted for the silent film Forsaking All Others in 1922. "Little Selves" was chosen from The Twenty Best American Short Stories of 1916 by editors John Updike and Katrina Kenison to be included in their Best American Short Stories of the Century collection.

== Bibliography ==
- “Summons.” The Forum Oct. 1914.
- "Without Benefit of a Chaperon." Romance. Jun. 1916.
- "Little Selves." Atlantic Monthly. Sep. 1916; reprint in The Illustrated Sunday Magazine. May 13, 1917.
- “The Business of Youth.” McCall’s. Oct. 1916.
- “Wages of Virtue.” All-Story. Feb. 3, 1917.
- “Sixteen.” McCall’s. Mar. 1917.
- “Forsaking All Others.” Collier’s Weekly. May 26, 1917. Adapted for silent film of same name Dec. 1922.
- "Sally's Jewels" in All-Story Weekly. Oct. 6, 1917.
- “Home on the Knoll.” Sunset Magazine. Jan. 1918.
- “Blue Eyes.” Metropolitan Magazine. Feb. 1918.
- "Plain Man or Poet." McCall's. May 1918.
- “Torches of Freedom.” Today’s Housewife. Jun. 1918.
- “Splendid Legend.” Harper’s Bazaar. Oct. 1918.
- "When a Girl's Single." Breezy Stories. Mar. 1919.
