= Virgin Lips =

1928 film

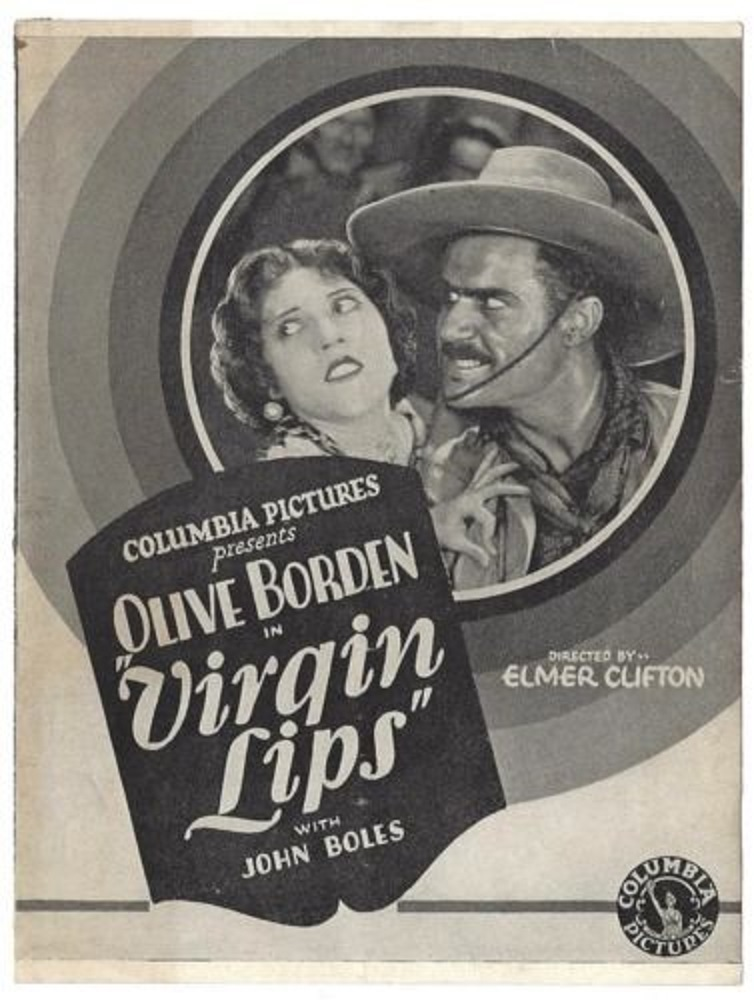
- Directed by: Elmer Clifton
- Written by: Jack Lait; Dorothy Howell; Charles Beahan
- Produced by: Harry Cohn
- Starring: Olive Borden; John Boles; Arline Pretty
- Cinematography: Joseph Walker
- Production company: Columbia Pictures
- Distributed by: Columbia Pictures
- Release date: July 25, 1928
- Running time: 59 minutes
- Country: United States
- Languages: Silent; English intertitles

Virgin Lips is a lost 1928 American silent drama film directed by Elmer Clifton and starring Olive Borden, John Boles and Arline Pretty.

== Plot ==
American mining interests in a Central American country hire an American aviator to help defend their investments from local bandits. He in turn receives assistance from an American café dancer who has ended up stranded in the country.

== Cast ==
- Olive Borden as Norma
- John Boles as Barry Blake
- Marshall Ruth as Slim
- Alexander Gill as García
- Richard Alexander as Carta
- Erne Veo as Nick
- Harry Semels as Patron
- Arline Pretty as Madge
- William H. Tooker as El Presidente

== Bibliography ==
- Munden, Kenneth White. The American Film Institute Catalog of Motion Pictures Produced in the United States, Part 1. University of California Press, 1997. ISBN 978-0-520-20969-5.
