= Money, Money, Money (film) =

1923 film

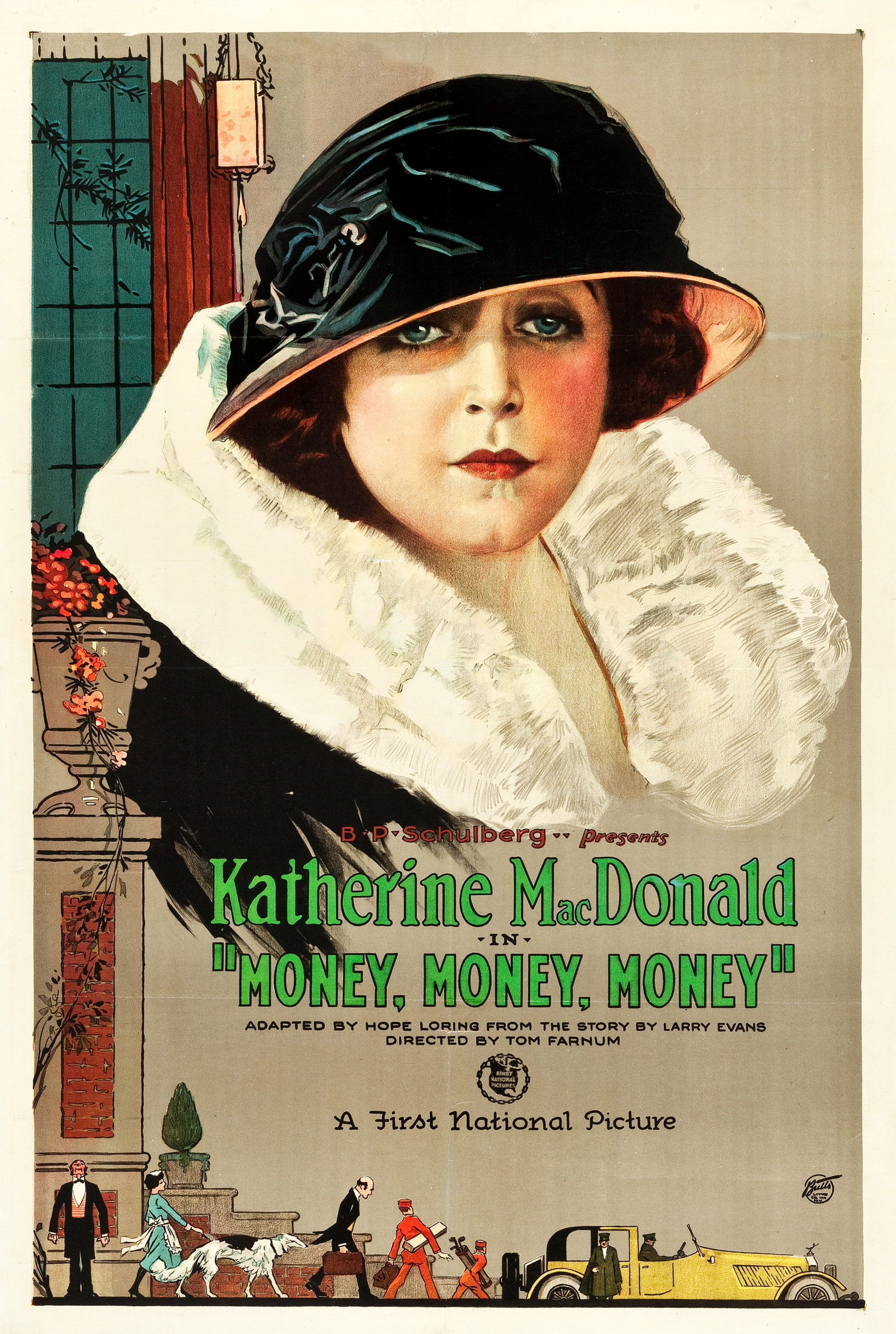
- Theatrical release poster
- Directed by: Tom Forman
- Written by: Hope Loring
- Based on: story by Larry Evans
- Starring: Katherine MacDonald
- Cinematography: Joseph Brotherton
- Production company: Preferred Pictures
- Distributed by: Associated First National (*later First National Pictures)
- Release date: January 23, 1923
- Running time: 6 reels
- Country: USA

Money, Money, Money is a lost 1923 silent film drama directed by Tom Forman and starring Katherine MacDonald. It was produced by B. P. Schulberg under his production company Preferred Pictures and released through Associated First National, soon to be First National Pictures.

== Cast ==
- Katherine MacDonald as Priscilla Hobbs
- Carl Stockdale as George C. Hobbs
- Frances Raymond as Mrs. Hobbs
- Paul Willis as Lennie Hubbs
- Herschel Mayall as Mr. Carter
- Brenda Fowler as Mrs. Carter
- Margaret Loomis as Caroline Carter
- Charles Clary as J. J. Grey
- Jack Dougherty as Reggie Grey
