= Bright Lights (1916 film) =

1916 film

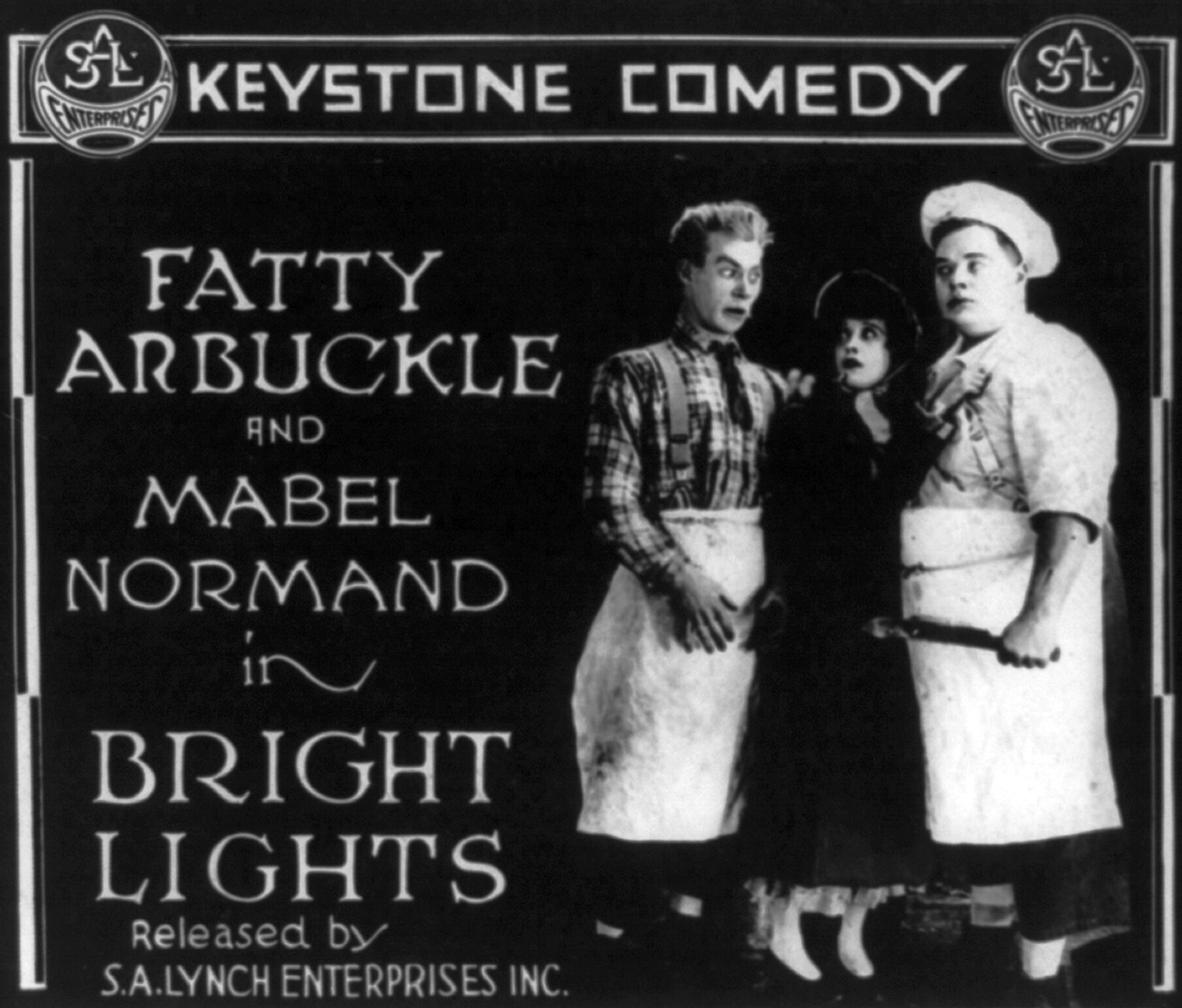
- Lantern slide with Al St. John, Mabel Normand and Roscoe Arbuckle
- Directed by: Roscoe Arbuckle
- Produced by: Mack Sennett
- Starring: Roscoe Arbuckle; Mabel Normand; Al St. John
- Distributed by: Triangle Film Corporation
- Release date: February 20, 1916
- Running time: 2 reels
- Country: United States
- Language: Silent (English intertitles)

Bright Lights is a 1916 American silent short comedy film directed by Roscoe Arbuckle and starring Arbuckle, Mabel Normand, and Al St. John.

== Cast ==
- Roscoe Arbuckle as Fatty
- Mabel Normand as Mabel
- Al St. John as The Bartender
- Joe Bordeaux as Man Used as Battering Ram by Fatty
- Jimmy Bryant as Minor Role
- Minta Durfee as Minor Role
- Gilbert Ely as Minor Role
- William Jefferson as The City Slicker

== See also ==
- List of American films of 1916
