= Colin Chase =

American silent film actor

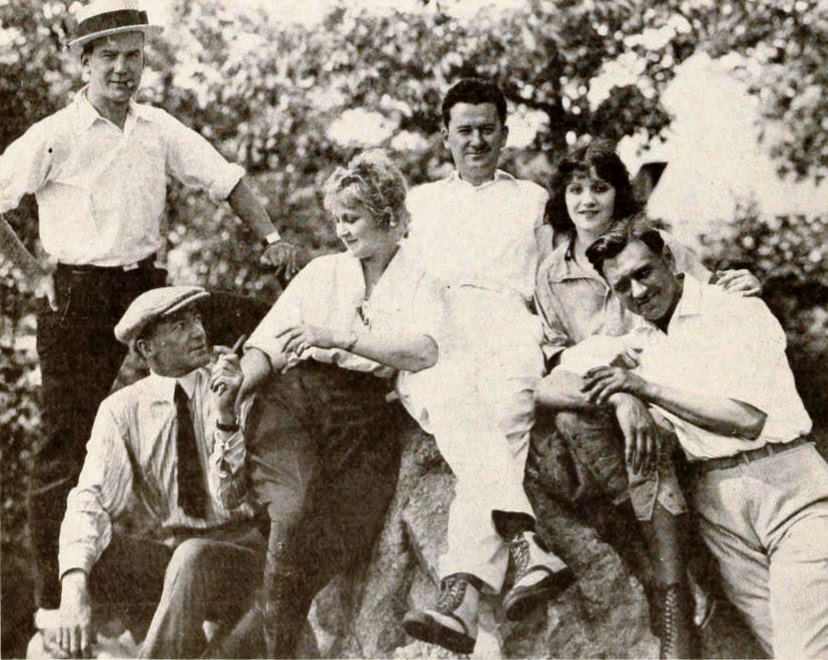
- Director Robert Ross, production company president Robert Broadwell, Mae Gaston, Thomas Carrigan, and Mrs. Colin Chase and Colin Chase on location for A Cry at Midnight (1916)
- Born: April 13, 1886
- Died: April 25, 1937 (aged 51)
- Occupation: Film actor
- Years active: 1915–1937

Colin Chase (April 13, 1886 – April 25, 1937) was an American silent film actor.

== Biography ==
Born in 1886 in Lewiston, Idaho, Chase signed for his first film role in 1915 and starred in about 45 films. In 1916, he signed a long-term contract with the Morosco-Pallas company.

Chase often was cast as a villain in Westerns, sometimes being billed as "Bud Chase". As a supporting player with Fox and other studios, he made the transition to sound films. He had been a cartoonist for a newspaper in Chicago and had performed in vaudeville.

Chase died on April 25, 1937, after an illness of several weeks, and one week after he had become "stricken with paralysis" from either a stroke or an illness. in Sawtelle, California.

== Partial filmography ==
- Father and the Boys (1915)
- The Grip of Jealousy (1916)
- Tangled Hearts (1916)
- The Making of Maddalena (1916)
- The Parson of Panamint (1916)
- The Road to Love (1916)
- The Right Direction (1916)
- Her Own People (1917)
- The Spirit of Romance (1917)
- The Bond Between (1917)
- A Strange Transgressor (1917)
- A Branded Soul (1917)
- The Moral Law (1918)
- Ace High (1918)
- Wives and Other Wives (1918)
- Bucking the Barrier (1923)
- Snowdrift (1923)
- The Godless Girl (1929)
- The Air Legion (1929)
- Big News (1929)
- The Lone Star Ranger (1930)
- The Vanishing Riders (1935)
- The Cyclone Ranger (1935)
