= Love in the Dark (film) =

1922 silent film

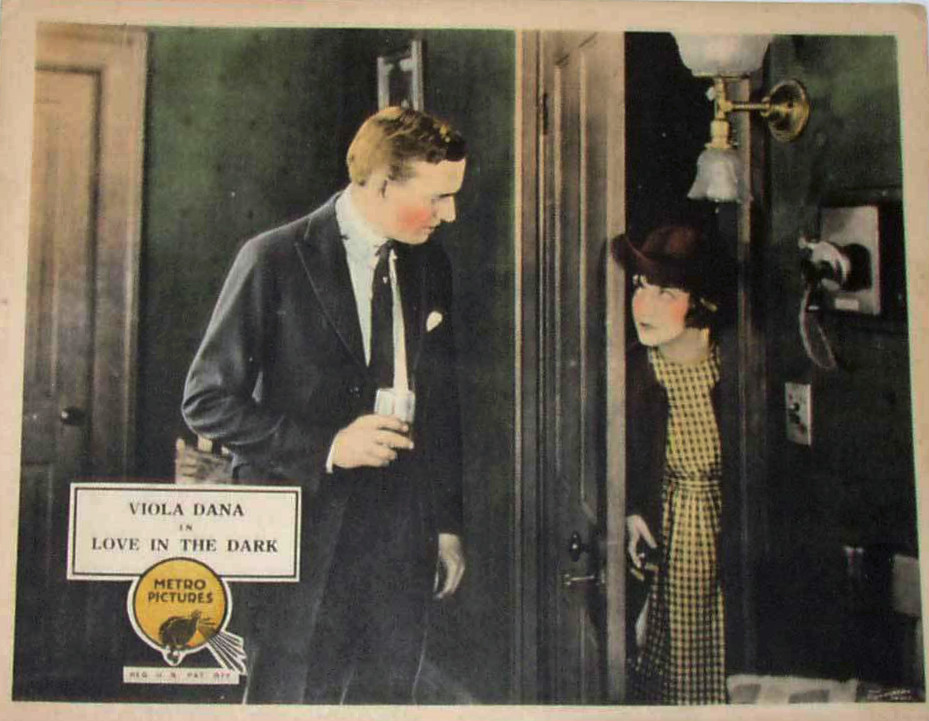
- Directed by: Harry Beaumont
- Written by: J.G. Hawks; John A. Moroso
- Produced by: Harry Beaumont
- Starring: Viola Dana; Cullen Landis; Arline Pretty
- Cinematography: John Arnold
- Production company: Metro Pictures
- Distributed by: Metro Pictures
- Release date: November 20, 1922
- Running time: 60 minutes
- Country: United States
- Language: Silent (English intertitles)

Love in the Dark is a 1922 American silent drama film directed by Harry Beaumont and starring Viola Dana, Cullen Landis, and Arline Pretty.

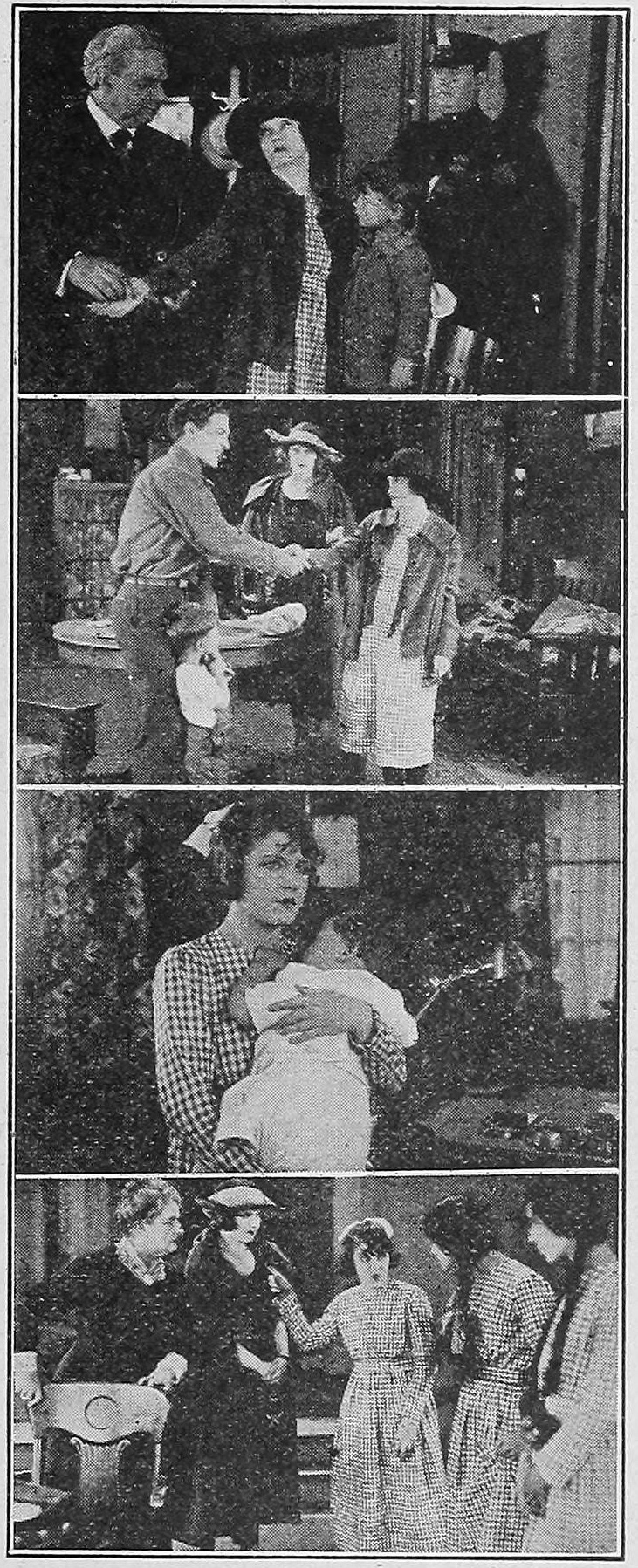
Publicity photos for the film.

== Cast ==
- Viola Dana as Mary Duffy
- Cullen Landis as Tim O'Brien
- Arline Pretty as Mrs. O'Brien
- Bruce Guerin as 'Red' O'Brien
- Edward Connelly as Dr. Horton
- Margaret Mann as Mrs. Horton
- John Harron as Robert Horton
- Charles West as Jimmy Watson

== Preservation ==
With no holdings located in archives, Love in the Dark is considered a lost film.

== Bibliography ==
- James Robert Parish & Michael R. Pitts. Film directors: a guide to their American films. Scarecrow Press, 1974.
