= The Valley of Doubt =

1920 film

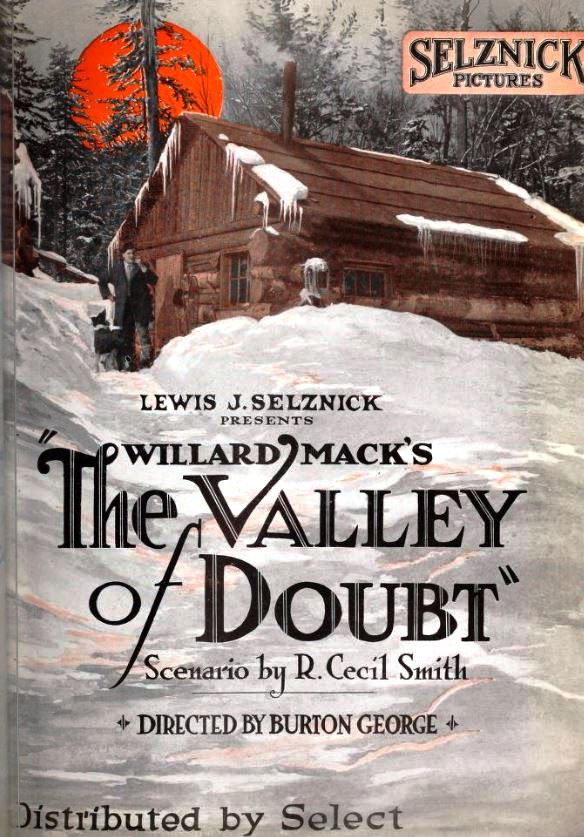
- Directed by: Burton George
- Written by: Willard Mack; R. Cecil Smith
- Produced by: Lewis J. Selznick
- Starring: Arline Pretty; Thurston Hall; Anna Lehr
- Production company: Selznick Pictures
- Distributed by: Selznick Pictures
- Release date: May 24, 1920
- Running time: 60 minutes
- Country: United States
- Languages: Silent; English intertitles

The Valley of Doubt is a 1920 American silent northern drama film directed by Burton George and starring Arline Pretty, Thurston Hall and Anna Lehr.

== Cast ==
- Arline Pretty as Marion
- Thurston Hall as Jules
- Anna Lehr as Annice
- William B. Davidson as Macy
- Robert Agnew as Tommy
- Jack Castello as Jacques
- T.J. Murray as Hilgrade
- John Ardizoni as Durant

== Bibliography ==
- Connelly, Robert B. The Silents: Silent Feature Films, 1910-36, Volume 40, Issue 2. December Press, 1998.
- Munden, Kenneth White. The American Film Institute Catalog of Motion Pictures Produced in the United States, Part 1. University of California Press, 1997.
