= A Son of Erin =

1916 film by Julia Crawford Ivers

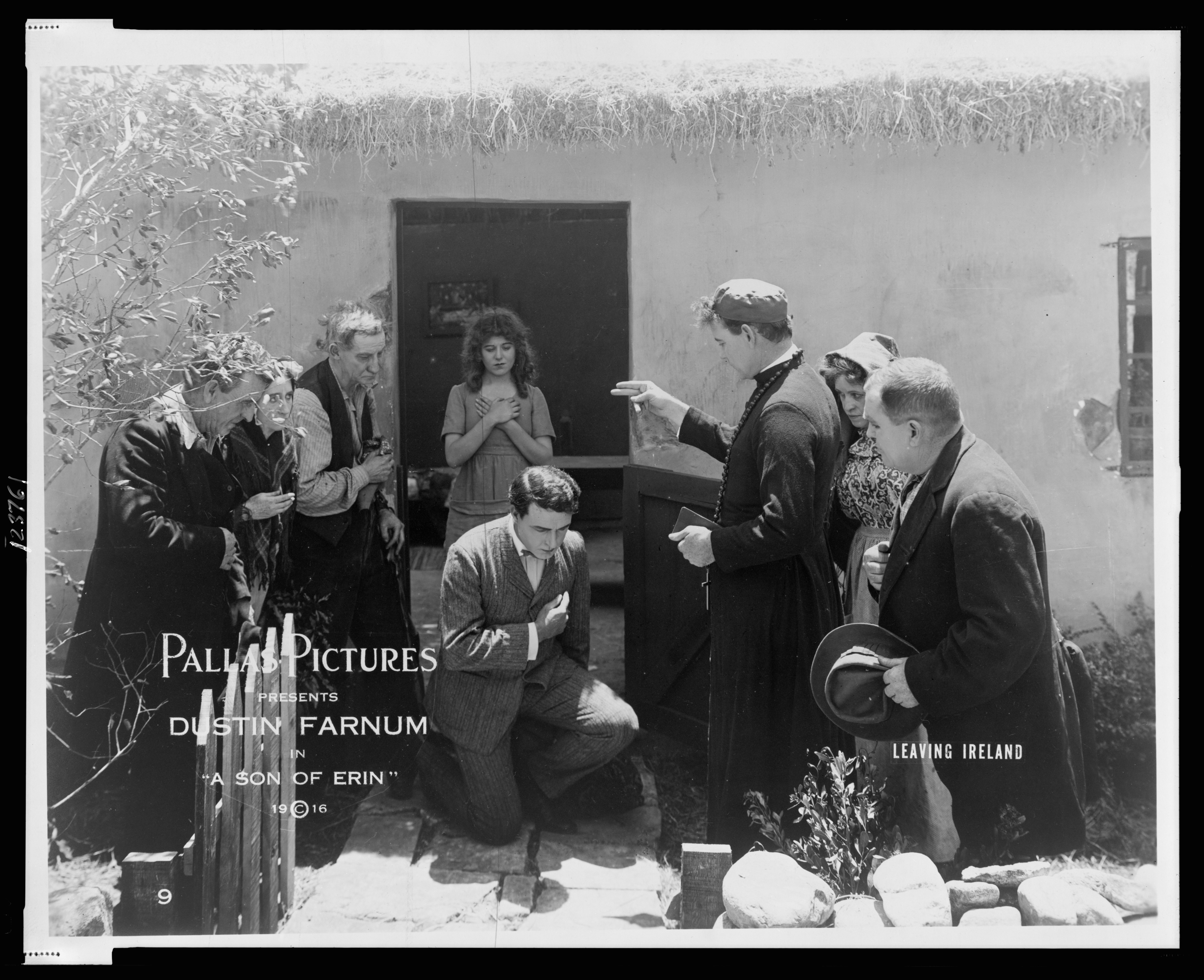
- Dustin Farnum in A Son of Erin
- Directed by: Julia Crawford Ivers
- Written by: Julia Crawford Ivers (story, screenplay)
- Produced by: Pallas Pictures
- Starring: Dustin Farnum; Winifred Kingston
- Cinematography: J. O. Taylor
- Production company: Famous Players–Lasky
- Distributed by: Paramount Pictures
- Release date: November 9, 1916
- Running time: 50 minutes; 5 reels
- Country: United States
- Language: Silent (English intertitles)

A Son of Erin is an extant 1916 American silent comedy drama film directed by Julia Crawford Ivers. It was produced by Pallas Pictures and distributed by Famous Players–Lasky and Paramount Pictures. Dustin Farnum and Winifred Kingston (real life husband and wife) star.

== Cast ==
- Dustin Farnum - Dennis O'Harhar
- Winifred Kingston - Katie O'Grady
- Tom Bates - Patrick O'Grady
- Jack Livingston - Brian Trelawney
- Wilfred McDonald - Terence
- Wallace Pyke - Dan O'Keefe
- Lee Willard - George Harding
- Mabel Wiles - Florence Harding
- Hugo B. Koch - John D. Haynes (as Hugh B. Koch)
