= The Road to Love =

1916 film by Scott Sidney

- Directed by: Scott Sidney
- Screenplay by: Blanche Dougan Cole; Gardner Hunting
- Produced by: Oliver Morosco
- Starring: Lenore Ulric; Colin Chase; Lucille Ward; Estelle Allen; Gayne Whitman; Herschel Mayall
- Cinematography: James Van Trees
- Production company: Oliver Morosco Photoplay Company
- Distributed by: Paramount Pictures
- Release date: December 7, 1916
- Running time: 50 minutes
- Country: United States
- Language: Silent (English intertitles)

The Road to Love is a surviving 1916 American silent drama film directed by Scott Sidney and written by Blanche Dougan Cole and Gardner Hunting. The film stars Lenore Ulric, Colin Chase, Lucille Ward, Estelle Allen, Gayne Whitman and Herschel Mayall. The film was released on December 7, 1916, by Paramount Pictures.

== Cast ==
- Lenore Ulric as Hafsa
- Colin Chase as Gordon Roberts
- Lucille Ward as Lella Sadiya
- Estelle Allen as Zorah
- Gayne Whitman as Karan
- Herschel Mayall as Sidi Malik
- Joe Massey as The Old Sheik
- Alfred Hollingsworth as Abdallah

== Preservation status ==
A copy is preserved in the Library of Congress collection.
