= The Girl on the Stairs (film) =

1925 film

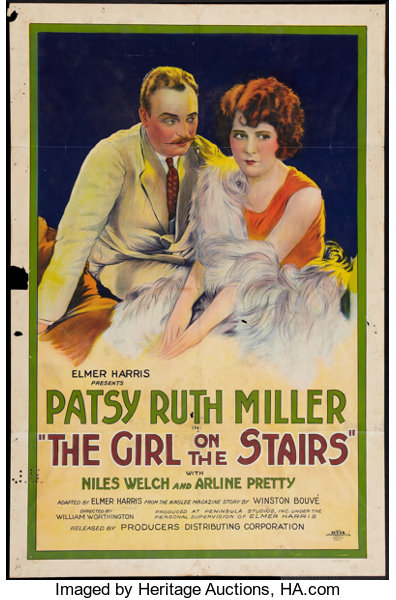
- Directed by: William Worthington
- Written by: Winston Bouve; Elmer Harris
- Starring: Patsy Ruth Miller; Niles Welch; Arline Pretty
- Cinematography: Charles E. Kaufman; Joseph Walker
- Production company: Peninsula Studios
- Distributed by: Producers Distributing Corporation
- Release date: March 1925
- Running time: 70 minutes
- Country: United States
- Languages: Silent; English intertitles

The Girl on the Stairs is a 1925 American silent mystery film directed by William Worthington and starring Patsy Ruth Miller, Niles Welch and Arline Pretty.

== Synopsis ==
After discovering that her lover is already married, a young woman gets engaged to another man. However, her attempts to recover embarrising love letters from her former lover lead to her being accused of murder when he is found dead.

== Cast ==
- Patsy Ruth Miller as Dora Sinclair
- Frances Raymond as Agatha Sinclair
- Arline Pretty as Joan Wakefield
- Shannon Day as Mañuela Sarmento
- Niles Welch as Frank Farrell
- Freeman Wood as Dick Wakefield
- Bertram Grassby as José Sarmento
- Michael Dark as Wilbur
- George Periolat as Dr. Bourget

== Bibliography ==
- Munden, Kenneth White. The American Film Institute Catalog of Motion Pictures Produced in the United States, Part 1. University of California Press, 1997.
