= The Trouble Buster =

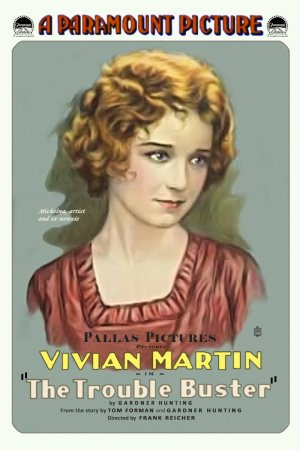
- Theatrical release poster
- Directed by: Frank Reicher
- Screenplay by: Tom Forman; Gardner Hunting
- Produced by: Julia Crawford Ivers
- Starring: Vivian Martin; James Neill; Paul Willis; Charles West; Louise Harris; Mary Mersch
- Cinematography: James Van Trees
- Production company: Pallas Pictures
- Distributed by: Paramount Pictures
- Release date: October 8, 1917
- Running time: 50 minutes
- Country: United States
- Language: Silent (English intertitles)

The Trouble Buster is a lost 1917 American drama silent film directed by Frank Reicher, written by Tom Forman and Gardner Hunting, and starring Vivian Martin, James Neill, Paul Willis, Charles West, Louise Harris, and Mary Mersch. It was released on October 8, 1917, by Paramount Pictures.

== Plot ==
As described in a film magazine, after the death of her father, Michelna is threatened with being sent to an orphan's asylum. She escapes and becomes the companion of "Blackie" Moyle, a newsboy. Donning his clothes she too sells newspapers. One night she is lured to a flat by Tip Morgan, a crook. Blackie rescues her, but in the struggle is blinded. Michelna has a statue that she has made and calls the Trouble Buster. She takes it to an art exhibit and it gains immediate favor. Blackie is given the credit for the statue, and with the money from the statue is able to get an operation which restores his sight. Michelna has taken an abode with some suburban folks where she works as the maid. One day while she is paying Tip some "silence" money, Blackie enters the scene, drives Tip away, and declares his love for her.

== Cast ==
- Vivian Martin as Michelna Libelt
- James Neill as Franz Libelt
- Paul Willis as "Blackie" Moyle
- Charles West as Tip Morgan
- Louise Harris as Mrs. Camden
- Mary Mersch as Ruth Camden
- Vera Lewis as Mrs. Westfall

== Reception ==
Like many American films of the time, The Trouble Buster was subject to cuts by city and state film censorship boards. The Chicago Board of Censors required a cut of a scene with the crook striking a boy on the head with a bottle.
