= The Son-of-a-Gun =

1919 film

- Theatrical release poster
- Directed by: Gilbert M. 'Broncho Billy' Anderson
- Written by: Gilbert M. 'Broncho Billy' Anderson (story); Jess Robbins (story)
- Produced by: Gilbert M. 'Broncho Billy' Anderson
- Starring: See below
- Release date: February 2, 1919
- Running time: 65 minutes
- Country: United States
- Languages: Silent; English intertitles

The Son-of-a-Gun is a 1919 American silent Western film directed by and starring Gilbert M. 'Broncho Billy' Anderson.

A surviving Anderson western preserved at the Library of Congress and also in versions on home video/DVD.

== Cast ==
- Gilbert M. 'Broncho Billy' Anderson as Bill
- Joy Lewis as May Brown
- Fred Church as Buck Saunders
- Frank Whitson as Double Deck Harry
- A.E. Wittin as W.L. 'Old Man' Brown
- Mattie Witting as Mother Brown
- Paul Willis as Buddy Brown
