= Tipped Off (1923 film) =

1923 film

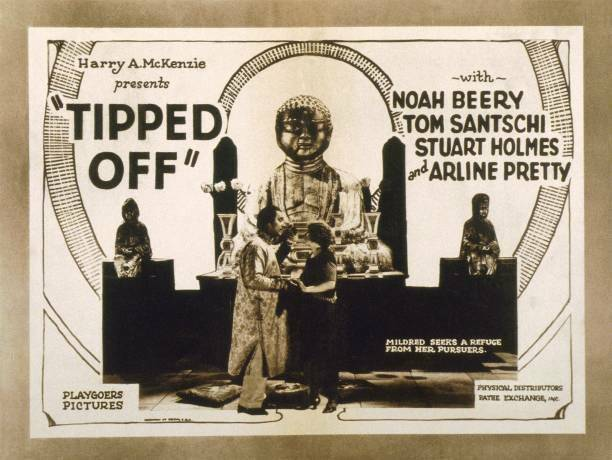
- Directed by: Finis Fox
- Written by: Frederick Reel Jr.
- Produced by: William Matthews
- Starring: Arline Pretty; Noah Beery; Stuart Holmes
- Cinematography: Harry M. Fowler
- Production company: Harry A. McKenzie Productions
- Distributed by: Playgoers Pictures
- Release date: August 14, 1923
- Running time: 50 minutes
- Country: United States
- Languages: Silent; English intertitles

Tipped Off is a lost 1923 American silent drama film directed by Finis Fox and starring Arline Pretty, Noah Beery and Stuart Holmes. It was distributed by the independent Playgoers Pictures.

== Plot ==
Mildred Garson, the fiancée of playwright Anthony Moore wants to star in his new crime drama. In order to convince him she stages a fake burglary at her home with the help of her brother and sister. However a real-life robbery takes place in which the butler is shot and Mildred kidnapped.

== Cast ==
- Arline Pretty as Mildred Garson
- Harold Miller as Anthony Moore
- Tom Santschi as 'The Fox,' Dan Grogan
- Noah Beery as Chang Wo
- Stuart Holmes as Sidney Matthews
- Zella Gray as Rita Garson, Rita's Sister
- Tom O'Brien as Jim 'Pug' Murphy, Mildred's Brother
- Bessie Wong as Chinese Maid
- James Alamo as Chuck Morrison, Henchman
- Jimmie Truax as Baldy Bates, Henchman
- S.D. Wilcox as The Detective Sergeant
- James Wang as Chang Wu's Major-domo
- Scotty MacGregor as The Stage Director

== Preservation ==
With no holdings located in archives, Tipped Off is considered a lost film.

== Bibliography ==
- Connelly, Robert B. The Silents: Silent Feature Films, 1910-36, Volume 40, Issue 2. December Press, 1998.
- Munden, Kenneth White. The American Film Institute Catalog of Motion Pictures Produced in the United States, Part 1. University of California Press, 1997.
