= Forsaking All Others (1922 film) =

1922 film by Emile Chautard

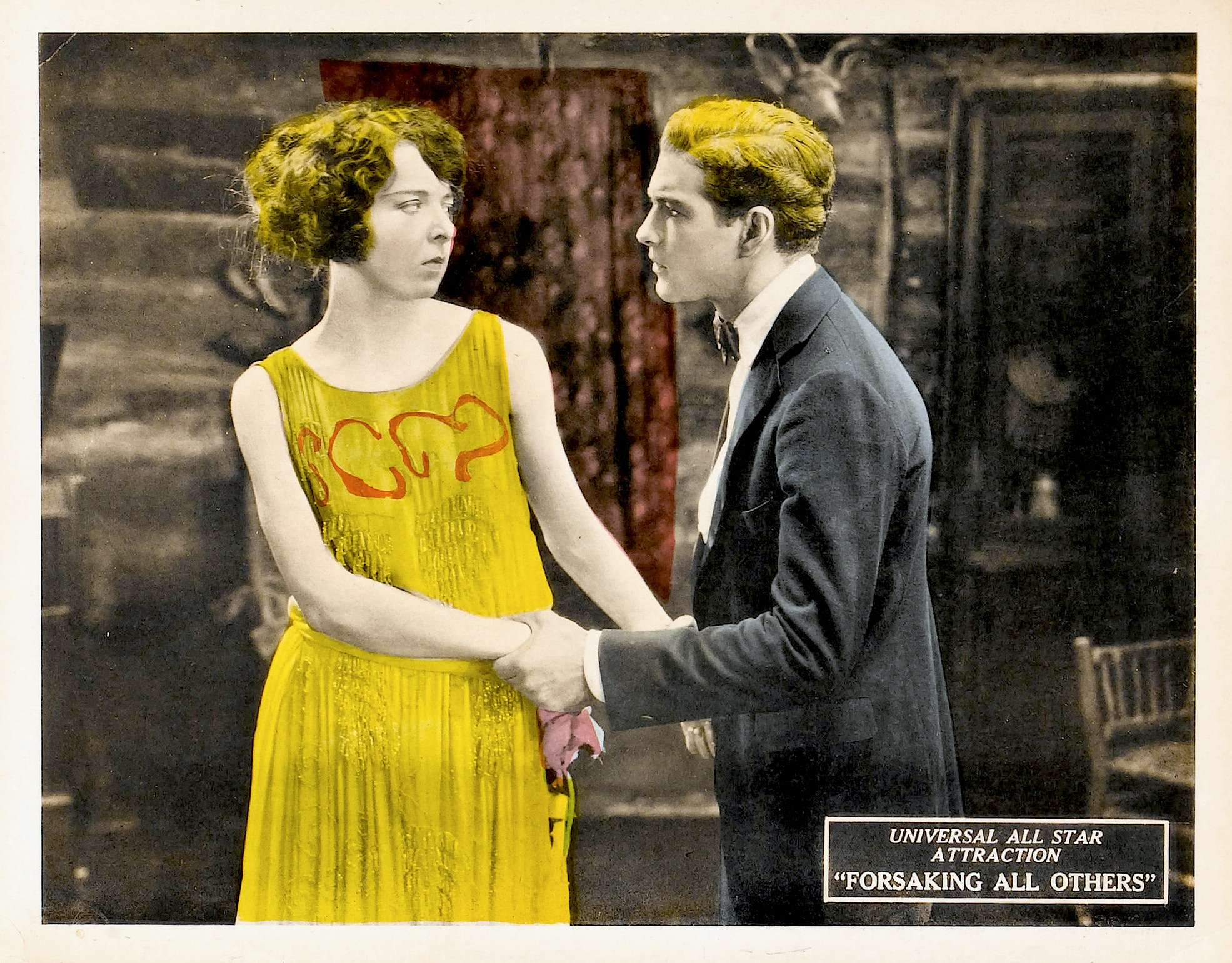
- Lobby card
- Directed by: Emile Chautard
- Written by: Doris Schroeder (scenario); Mary Lerner (story)
- Produced by: Carl Laemmle
- Starring: Colleen Moore; Cullen Landis; Sam De Grasse; June Elvidge
- Cinematography: Charles Stumar
- Production company: Universal Studios
- Release date: December 10, 1922
- Country: United States
- Language: Silent (English intertitles)

Forsaking All Others is a 1922 American silent drama film starring actress Colleen Moore and directed by Emile Chautard for Universal Studios. It was made before Colleen became famous as a flapper but did visit some of the same subjects her later films would.

== Plot ==
Mrs. Newell is jealous of her son Oliver's interest in Penelope Mason and she does everything she can to keep the two apart. She fakes an illness and travels to a resort with Oliver, separating him from his sweetheart. However, while there, he catches the eye of the designing Enid Morton, a married woman. Enid’s husband is the jealous type. After some near-disastrous situations with Enid's suspicious husband, Mrs. Newell realizes the mistake she has made in keeping her son away from Penelope. She convinces Penelope to come to Oliver's rescue.

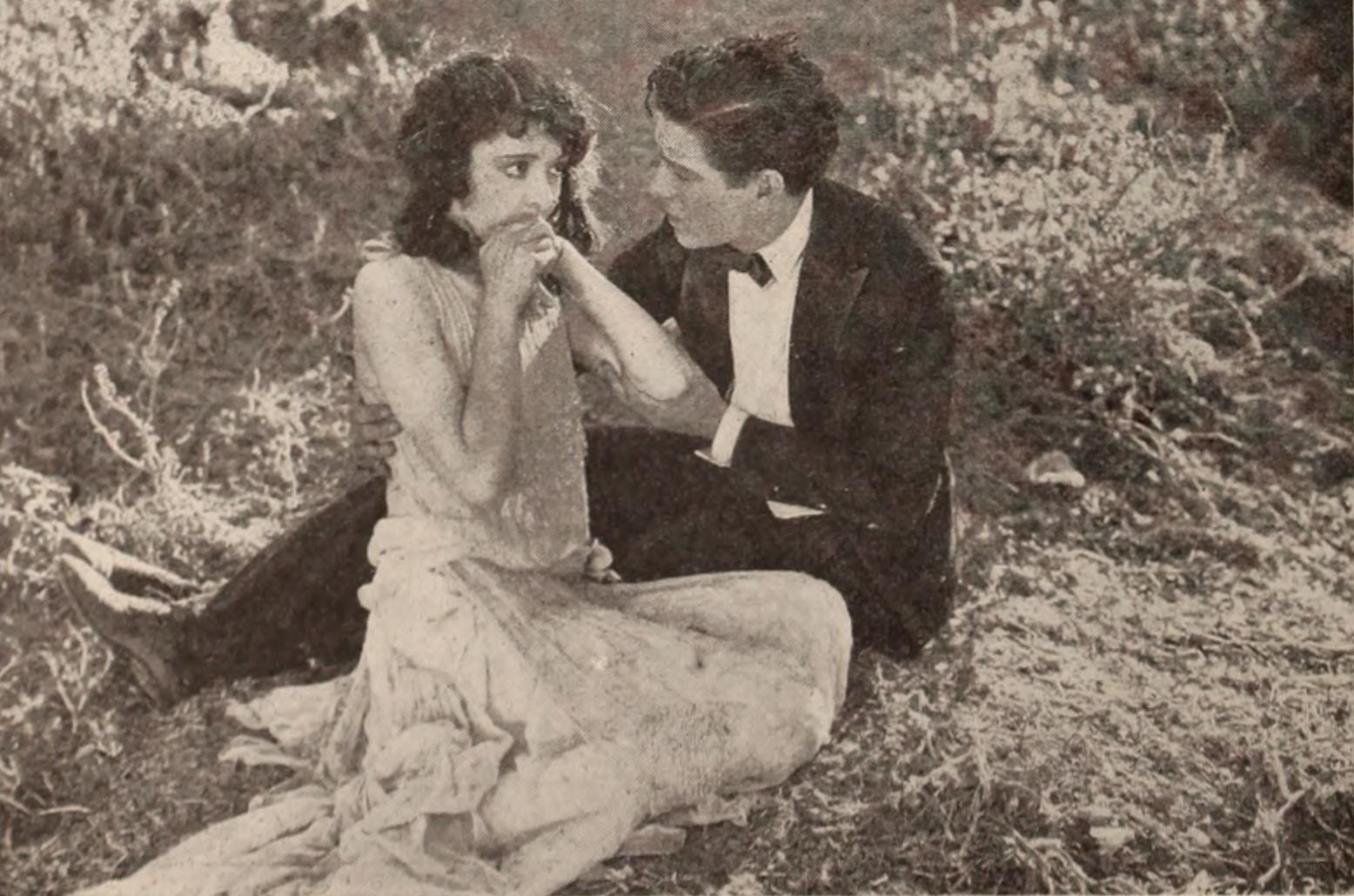
Moore and Landis in a scene from the film

== Cast ==
- Colleen Moore as Penelope Mason
- Cullen Landis as Oliver Newell
- Irene Wallace as Mrs. Newell
- Sam De Grasse as Dr. Mason
- June Elvidge as Enid Morton
- David Torrence as Mr. Morton
- Melbourne MacDowell as Cyrus K. Wharton
- Elinor Hancock as Mrs. Wharton
- Lucille Ricksen as May Wharton

== Background ==
Made for Universal, Forsaking All Others was based on a short story of the same title by Mary Lerner that had been published in Collier’s Weekly on May 26, 1917, illustrated by James Montgomery Flagg. The story touched on topical subjects such as youth and the temptations of youth, and to the potential for damage when attempting to reign in youth’s energies. The story was a natural for adaptation to the screen at a time when the motion picture industry was increasingly turning to sensation to attract audiences. Colleen Moore had yet to find fame as a flapper, but that time was just around the corner and this story presaged that fame. It was an unusual film in that the mother was acting out of selfish reasons, as opposed to the standard tack of self-sacrificing mothers so much in cinema vogue at the time. There were no heavies or villains in the traditional sense, though the characters played by June Belvidge and David Torrence managed to direct the action to its share of mistakes and obstacles. Colleen followed up this film with The Ninety and Nine, and old-fashioned morality tale that stood in sharp contrast to the racier Forsaking All Others. In December 1922 the film was released, the first of a trio of films Colleen had made in rapid succession: Forsaking All Others, The Ninety and Nine, and Broken Chains... on the 10th, the 17th, and the 24th. They were produced by Universal, Vitagraph, and Goldwyn Pictures.
