= Nobody's Kid =

1921 film

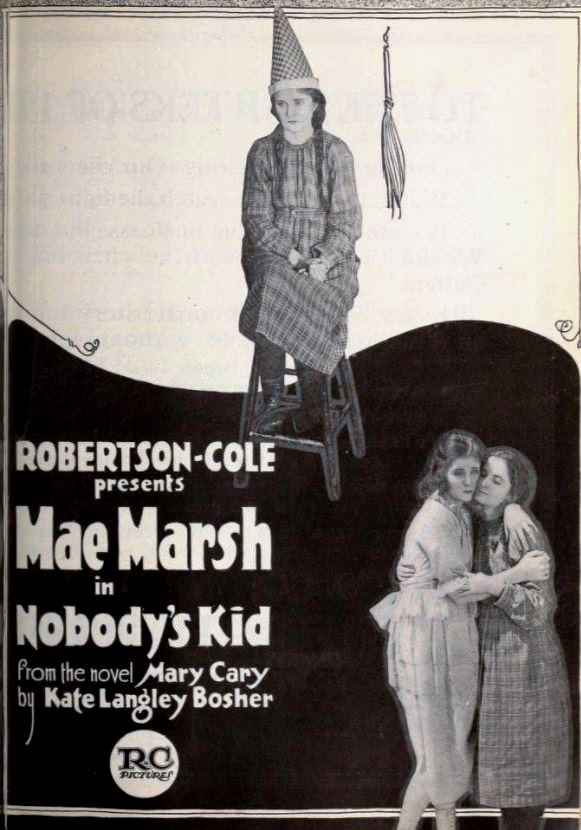
- Directed by: Howard Hickman
- Written by: Catherine Carr; Howard Hickman
- Based on: Mary Cary "Frequently Martha" by Kate Langley Bosher
- Starring: Mae Marsh; Kathleen Kirkham; Anne Schaefer
- Cinematography: Robert Newhard
- Production company: Robertson-Cole Pictures Corporation
- Distributed by: Robertson-Cole Pictures Corporation
- Release date: April 17, 1921
- Running time: 50 minutes
- Country: United States
- Languages: Silent; English intertitles

Nobody's Kid is a 1921 American silent comedy drama film directed by Howard Hickman and starring Mae Marsh, Kathleen Kirkham and Anne Schaefer. It was based on the 1910 novel Mary Cary "Frequently Martha" by Kate Langley Bosher.

== Cast ==
- Mae Marsh as Mary Cary
- Kathleen Kirkham as Katherine Trent
- Anne Schaefer as Miss Bray
- Maxine Elliott Hicks as Pinky Moore
- John Steppling as Dr. Rudd
- Paul Willis as John Maxwell

== Bibliography ==
- Goble, Alan. The Complete Index to Literary Sources in Film. Walter de Gruyter, 1999.
