= The Victor (1923 film) =

1923 film

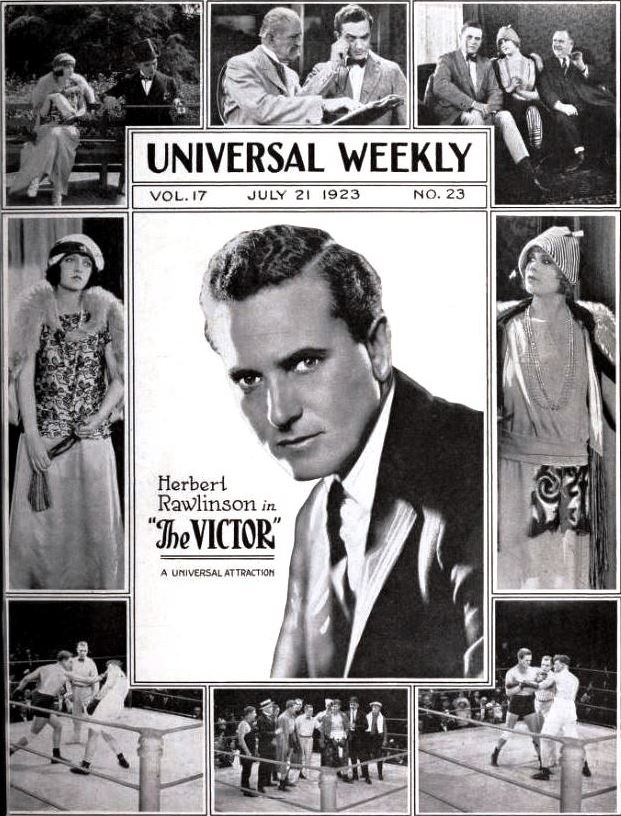
- Directed by: Edward Laemmle
- Written by: Richard Schayer
- Based on: Two Bells for Pegasus by Gerald Beaumont
- Produced by: Carl Laemmle
- Starring: Herbert Rawlinson; Frank Currier; Esther Ralston
- Cinematography: Clyde De Vinna
- Production company: Universal Pictures
- Distributed by: Universal Pictures
- Release date: July 22, 1923
- Running time: 50 minutes
- Country: United States
- Languages: Silent; English intertitles

The Victor is a 1923 American silent romantic comedy film directed by Edward Laemmle and starring Herbert Rawlinson, Frank Currier and Esther Ralston.

== Synopsis ==
The Englishman Cecil Fitzhugh Waring is sent to America by his father Lord Waring to save the family's finances by marrying the daughter of a chewing gum tycoon. Unwilling to go through with the plan, he wanders the streets and meets a struggling actress who he falls in love with. To raise money he becomes a boxer and enjoys such success that he restores the family fortune, and gets his father's blessing to his marriage to the actress.

== Cast ==
- Herbert Rawlinson as Cecil Fitzhugh Waring
- Dorothy Manners as Teddi Walters
- Frank Currier as Teddi Walters Father
- Otis Harlan as Chewing Gum Baron
- Esther Ralston as Chewing Gum Baron's Daughter
- Eddie Gribbon as Porky Schaup, Boxer
- Tom McGuire as Jacky Williams

== Bibliography ==
- Connelly, Robert B. The Silents: Silent Feature Films, 1910-36, Volume 40, Issue 2. December Press, 1998.
- Munden, Kenneth White. The American Film Institute Catalog of Motion Pictures Produced in the United States, Part 1. University of California Press, 1997.
