= The Heart of Paula =

1916 film by William Desmond Taylor, Julia Crawford Ivers

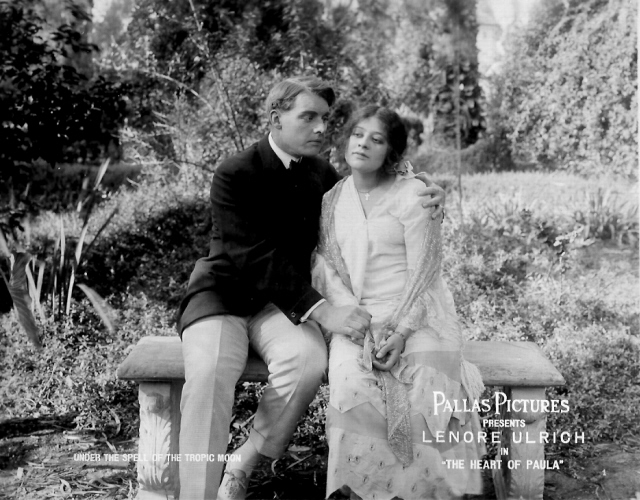
- A scene from the film featuring Forrest Stanley & Lenore Ulrich
- Directed by: Julia Crawford Ivers; William Desmond Taylor
- Produced by: Pallas Pictures
- Starring: Lenore Ulric
- Cinematography: James Van Trees
- Distributed by: Paramount Pictures
- Release date: April 2, 1916
- Running time: 5 reels
- Country: United States
- Languages: Silent film English intertitles

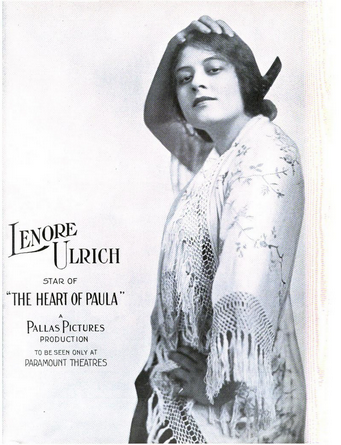
Lenore Ulrich in "The Heart of Paula" (1916)

The Heart of Paula is a 1916 American silent film directed by Julia Crawford Ivers and William Desmond Taylor, starring Lenore Ulric. This film survives at the Library of Congress.

As briefly-described in a 1916 publication, this five-reel film is a "story of romance and adventure in Mexico. Lenore Ulrich is the Spanish girl who loves an American engineer."

Two endings were prepared for the film—one happy and one tragic. This was a first, and critics were asked to vote for which ending they preferred, but the vote ended in a tie.

== Cast ==
- Lenore Ulric as Paula Figueroa
- Velma Lefler as Claire Pachmann
- Jack Livingston as Stephen Pachmann
- Forrest Stanley as Bruce McLean
- Howard Davies as Emiliano Pacheco
- Herbert Standing as Mr. Adams
- Antonio Corsi as Dieguez
