= Dorothy Manners =

American gossip columnist

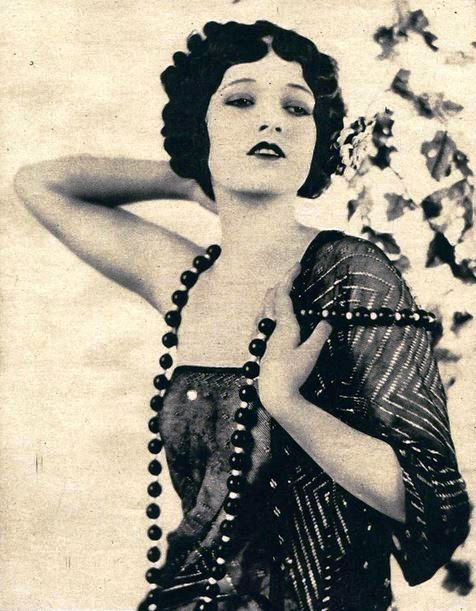
- Born: 1903; Fort Worth, Texas
- Died: August 1998; Palm Springs, California
- Other names: Dorothy Manners Haskell
- Occupation(s): actress, columnist
- Years active: 1921—1977

Dorothy Manners was an American gossip columnist and actress who wrote the celebrity news column Hollywood for King Features Syndicate from 1965 to 1977. She took over the column from Louella Parsons, for whom she had worked as an assistant for 30 years.

As an actress, Manners appeared in the films Snowdrift (1923) and The Victor (1923).

== Early life and education ==
Manners was born Dorothy Manners Greene in Fort Worth, Texas in about 1903. and moved to Los Angeles as a teenager, attending Los Angeles public schools.

She signed a contract with Fox Film Corporation at the age of 17 and began working as an extra in films directed by Cecil B. DeMille and starring Gloria Swanson, Douglas Fairbanks, and William Powell.

== Career ==
Before becoming a writer, Manners worked as an actress, appearing in several silent films between 1921 and 1923. Her last major role was in The Victor, a romantic comedy in which she played the female lead opposite Herbert Rawlinson.

In 1922, Manners sued actress Sally Rosse, who also acted under the name "Dorothy Manners", to prevent Rosse from using the name professionally.

Reportedly considering herself "a lousy actress," Manners decided to quit acting to become a writer. She began writing for The Hollywood Citizen and The Los Angeles Times.

In 1935, Manners began working at Motion Picture Magazine as an assistant to celebrity gossip columnist Louella Parsons, after submitting an article about her experience as an actress that reportedly impressed Parsons. As Parsons' assistant, Manners had occasionally written the column while Parsons was on vacation or otherwise unavailable. Parsons began suffering from various health problems in 1962, leading Manners to assume a larger role in the writing of the column. In 1965, Parsons retired, and Manners assumed full authorship of the column.

Manners' byline appeared regularly in local newspapers across the United States, including San Antonio Light, Bradford Era, and Jeffersonville Evening News, among others. In 1966, she was named entertainment columnist of the year by the California Women's Press Club. By June 1970, she was the motion picture editor for Hearst Newspapers. She frequently appeared on television talk shows hosted by Steve Allen, Joey Bishop, Dick Cavett, and Mike Douglas.

Manners announced her decision to retire in December 1977. Authorship of the column was taken over by Dorothy Treloar, a former actress who had worked as an assistant to both Manners and Parsons.

=== Filmography ===
- The Victor (1923)
- Snowdrift (1923)
- Garrison's Finish (1923)
- Pawn Ticket 210 (1922)
- Across the Divide (1921)

== Private life and death ==
Manners was married to Walter Ramsey for 10 years until their divorce. She was later married to John Haskell for 30 years, until he died in 1970.

Dorothy Manners died in her home in Palm Springs, California in August 1998 at the age of 95. Her husband, Haskell, had died in 1977, and she reportedly had no surviving relatives.
