= The Huntress (1923 film) =

1923 American film

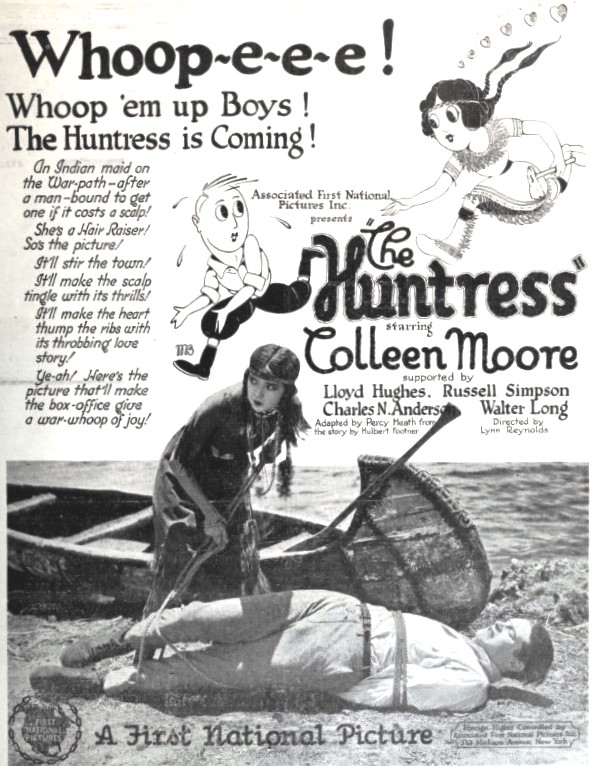
- Advertisement
- Directed by: Lynn Reynolds
- Screenplay by: Percy Heath
- Based on: The Huntress by Hulbert Footner
- Starring: Colleen Moore; Lloyd Hughes; Russell Simpson; Walter Long; C.E. Anderson; Snitz Edwards
- Cinematography: James Van Trees
- Production company: John McCormick Productions
- Distributed by: Associated First National Pictures
- Release date: August 20, 1923
- Running time: 1 hour
- Country: United States
- Language: Silent (English intertitles)

The Huntress is a 1923 American drama film directed by Lynn Reynolds and written by Percy Heath. It is based on the 1922 novel The Huntress by Hulbert Footner. The film stars Colleen Moore, Lloyd Hughes, Russell Simpson, Walter Long, C.E. Anderson, and Snitz Edwards. The film was released on August 20, 1923, by Associated First National Pictures.

== Cast ==
- Colleen Moore as Bela
- Lloyd Hughes as Sam Gladding
- Russell Simpson as Big Jack Skinner
- Walter Long as Joe Hagland
- C.E. Anderson as Black Shand Frazer
- Snitz Edwards as Musq'oosis
- Wilfrid North as John Gladding
- Helen Raymond as Mrs. John Gladding
- William Marion as William Gladding
- Lila Leslie as Mrs. William Gladding
- Larry Steers as Richard Gladding
- Helen Walton as Mrs. Richard Gladding
- John Lince as Butler
- Lalo Encinas as Beavertail
- Chief John Big Tree as Otebaya

== Production ==
This was the first of five films, in three years, with Moore and Hughes starring in the lead roles. They also appeared together in Sally (1925), The Desert Flower (1925), Irene (1926), and Ella Cinders (1926).

== Preservation ==
With no prints of The Huntress located in any film archives, it is a lost film.
