= The Making of Maddalena =

1916 film by Frank Lloyd

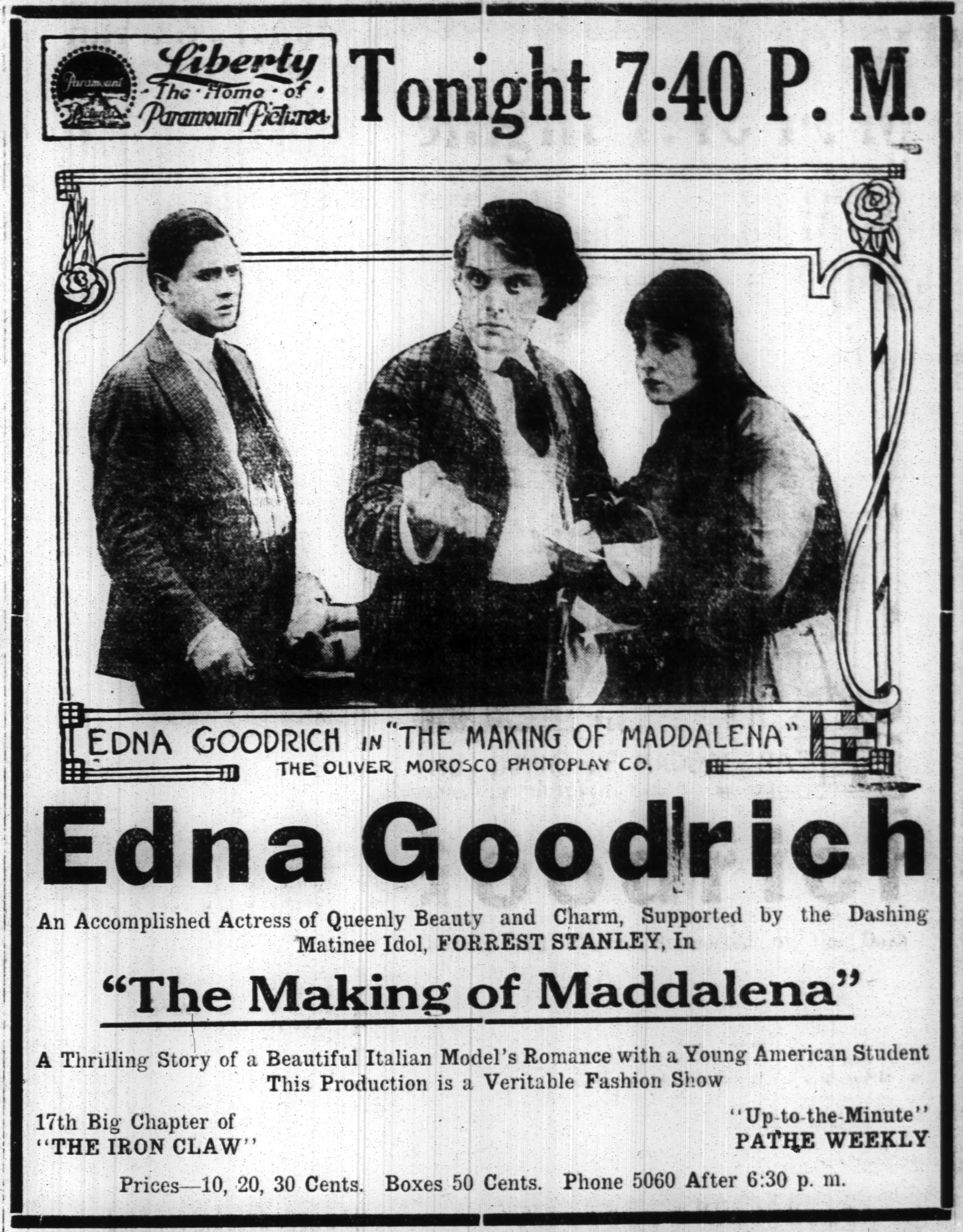
- Newspaper advertisement
- Directed by: Frank Lloyd
- Screenplay by: L. V. Jefferson
- Based on: The Making of Maddalena; or, The Compromise by Samuel Service and Mary Service
- Produced by: Oliver Morosco
- Starring: Edna Goodrich; Forrest Stanley; Howard Davies; John Burton; Mary Mersch; Colin Chase
- Cinematography: James Van Trees
- Production company: Oliver Morosco Photoplay Company
- Distributed by: Paramount Pictures
- Release date: June 8, 1916
- Running time: 50 minutes
- Country: United States
- Language: Silent (English intertitles)

The Making of Maddalena is a 1916 American silent drama film directed by Frank Lloyd and written by L. V. Jefferson based upon a play by Samuel Service and Mary Service. The film stars Edna Goodrich, Forrest Stanley, Howard Davies, John Burton, Mary Mersch, and Colin Chase. The film was released on June 8, 1916, by Paramount Pictures. It is preserved in the Library of Congress collection.

== Plot ==
The story was described in advertising as the story of a beautiful Italian model's romance with a young American.

== Cast ==
- Edna Goodrich as Maddalena
- Forrest Stanley as George Hale
- Howard Davies as Angelo
- John Burton as Randolph Hale
- Mary Mersch as Blanche Belgrave
- Colin Chase as Augustus Foster
- Juan de la Cruz as Signor Benedetto Pastorelli
- Laura La Varnie as Marie
- Katherine Griffith as Mrs. Wright
- Mary Bunting as Mrs. Hale
- Violet White
- Walter S. Fredericks
