= His Wife's Mistakes =

1916 film

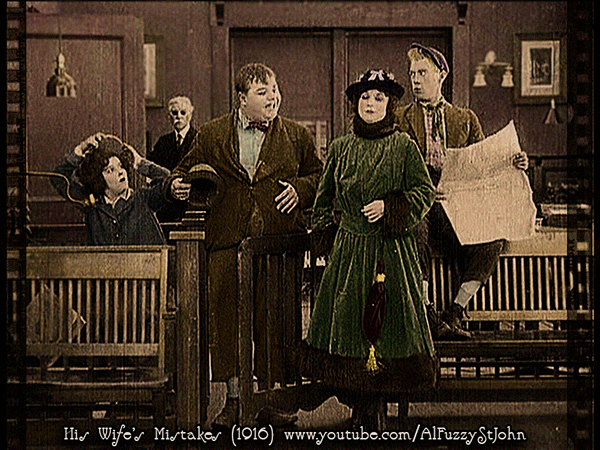
- Directed by: Roscoe Arbuckle
- Starring: Roscoe Arbuckle
- Release date: April 2, 1916
- Running time: 2 reels
- Country: United States
- Languages: Silent; English subtitles

His Wife's Mistakes is a 1916 American short comedy film directed by and starring Fatty Arbuckle. This film survives.

== Cast ==
- Roscoe Arbuckle
- Minta Durfee
- Joe Bordeaux
- Arthur Earle - Percy Dovewing
- Betty Gray
- William Jefferson
- Alfred St. John

== See also ==
- Fatty Arbuckle filmography
