= The Bond Between =

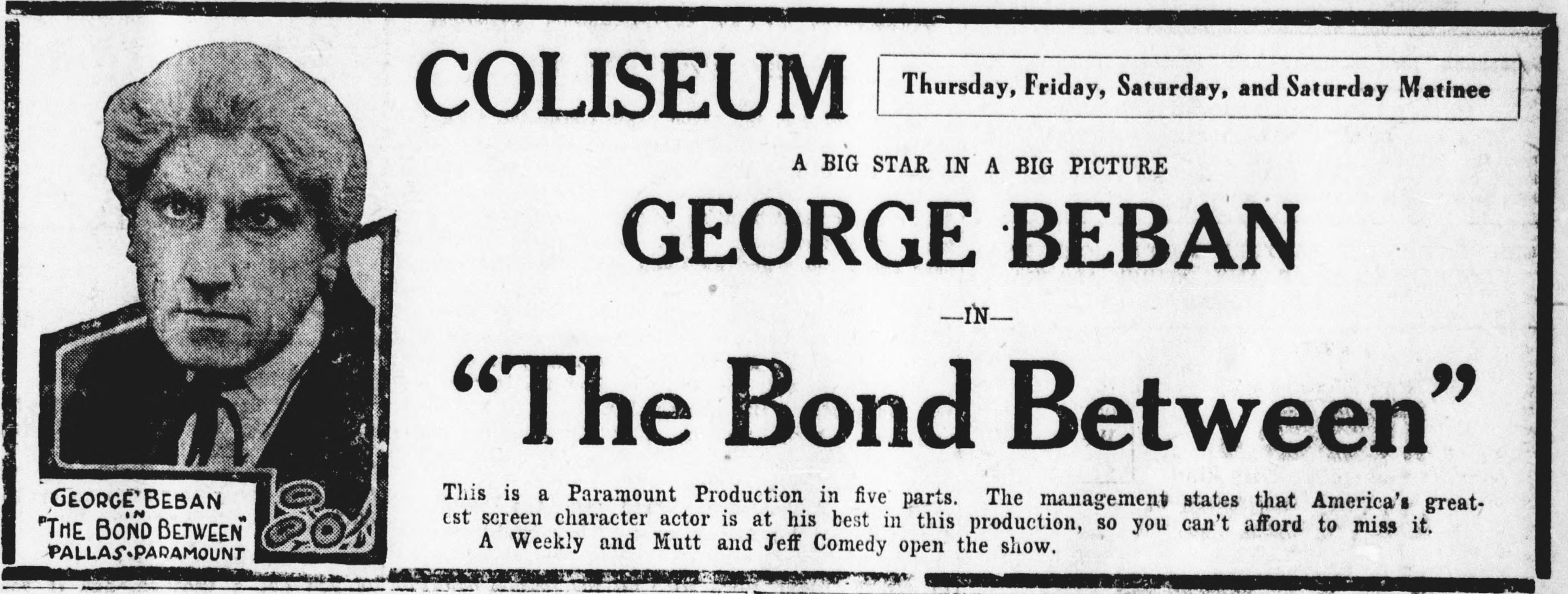
- Newspaper advertisement
- Directed by: Donald Crisp
- Screenplay by: George Beban
- Produced by: Julia Crawford Ivers
- Starring: George Beban; John Burton; Nigel De Brulier; Paul Weigel; Colin Chase; Eugene Pallette
- Cinematography: J.O. Taylor
- Production company: Pallas Pictures
- Distributed by: Paramount Pictures
- Release date: April 2, 1917
- Running time: 50 minutes
- Country: United States
- Language: Silent (English intertitles)

The Bond Between is a 1917 American silent drama film directed by Donald Crisp and written by George Beban. The film stars George Beban, John Burton, Nigel De Brulier, Paul Weigel, Colin Chase, and Eugene Pallette. The film was released on April 2, 1917, by Paramount Pictures.

== Cast ==
- George Beban as Pierre Duval
- John Burton as Hans von Meyernick
- Nigel De Brulier as Feole Zelnar
- Paul Weigel as Carl Riminoss
- Colin Chase as Jacques Duval
- Eugene Pallette as Raoul Vaux
- W.H. Bainbridge as John Fownes
- Vola Vale as Ellen Ingram
- Pietro Buzzi as M. Lorillard
- Mrs. Buehler as Mme. Lorillard
