= The Right Direction =

1916 film by E. Mason Hopper

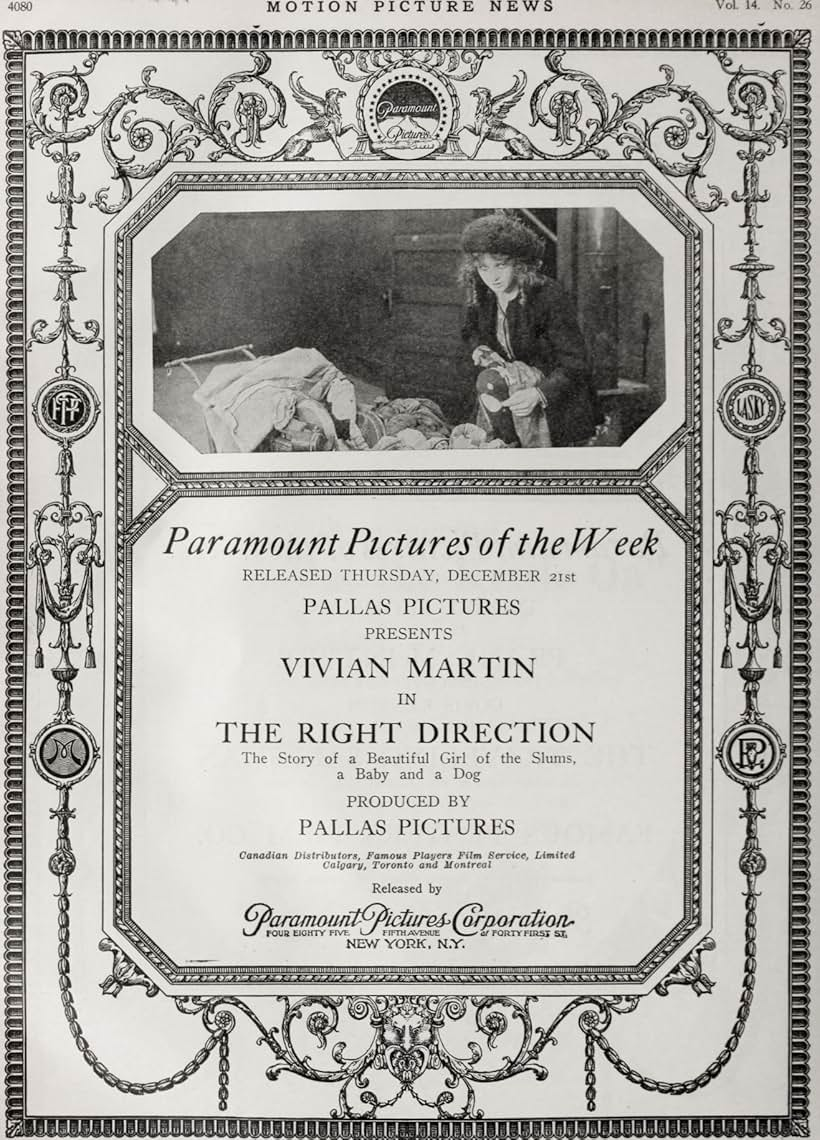
- Directed by: E. Mason Hopper
- Screenplay by: Julia Crawford Ivers
- Starring: Vivian Martin; Colin Chase; Herbert Standing; Alfred Hollingsworth; Billy Mason; Baby Jack White
- Cinematography: James Van Trees
- Production company: Pallas Pictures
- Distributed by: Paramount Pictures
- Release date: December 21, 1916
- Running time: 50 minutes
- Country: United States
- Language: English

The Right Direction is a 1916 American comedy silent film directed by E. Mason Hopper, written by Julia Crawford Ivers, and starring Vivian Martin, Colin Chase, Herbert Standing, Alfred Hollingsworth, Billy Mason and Baby Jack White. The film was released on December 21, 1916, by Paramount Pictures.

== Plot ==
The film is a story of a girl who thinks she can walk to California so that her brother will get well. She goes through many trials getting to California with her four-year-old brother and a dog.

== Cast ==
- Vivian Martin as Polly Eccles
- Colin Chase as Kirk Drummond
- Herbert Standing as John Drummond
- Alfred Hollingsworth as Big Bill
- Billy Mason as Harry Lockwood
- Baby Jack White as Billy Boy
- William Jefferson (actor) as Jack Marsh
