= Arline Pretty =

American actress (1885–1978)

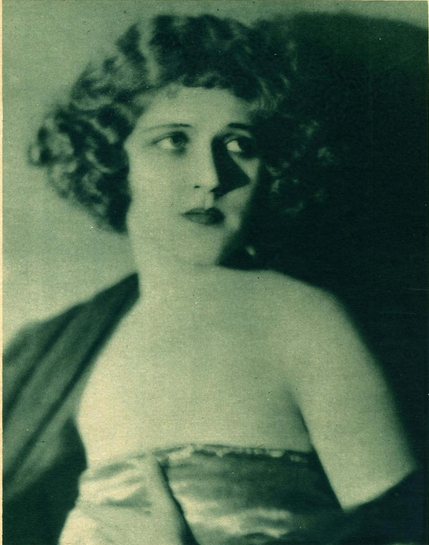
- Born: September 5, 1885; Philadelphia, Pennsylvania, U.S.
- Died: April 14, 1978 (aged 92); Los Angeles, California, U.S.
- Occupation: Actress
- Years active: 1913-1935 (film)

Arline S. Pretty (September 5, 1885 – April 14, 1978) was an American film actress of the silent era.

== Early life and education ==
Pretty was born September 5, 1885, in Philadelphia, the daughter of Edwin S. Pretty and Ellen (Nellie) Service Pretty. Her father died in 1894. Her mother was a musician, and the name "Arline" was chosen from the opera The Bohemian Girl. She may have attended a school in High Bridge, New Jersey. In 1903 she delivered a dramatic monologue at a meeting of the District of Columbia League of Debating Societies.

== Career ==
In 1903 Pretty was founding member of the Criterion Players (CP) in Washington D.C. She appeared in this organization's first production as the wife in Sydney Grundy's Prince of Liars which was staged at National Rifle Hall in November 1903. The Washington Post stated her performance was "commendably done". She performed with the CP in 1904 as Etta in Suzette, the Widow in A Mouse Trap, and Mrs. Hummingtop in M. E. Kahn's What Happened to Hummingtop. She was still actively performing in plays with the CP as late as 1907.

In 1908 Pretty performed in vaudeville in Washington D.C. in a sketch called "The Happy Pair" with John Hill. For three years she acted on stage in Washington, with the Columbia Stock Company (CSC), before debuting in films in 1913. Some of her repertoire with the CSC included Paul Kester's When Knighthood Was in Flower (1911, as Jan Bollingbrook). David Belasco and Richard Walton Tully's The Rose of the Rancho (1912, as Beatriz), Clyde Fitch's The Climbers (1912, as Jessica Hunter), and Charles H. Hoyt's A Contented Woman (1913, as Bella).

Her early film experience was as a supporting actress for King Baggot at Universal. After that, she acted for the Vitagraph Company in leading ingenue parts. She appeared as the daughter of a jailer with Douglas Fairbanks in In Again, Out Again (1917). Pretty's film work included the Vitagraph serial The Secret Kingdom (1917). In the serial A Woman in Grey (1919), she was tied to train tracks as a cliffhanger scene. Her other costars included Jess Willard, Jack Mower, Thurston Hall, Huntley Gordon, Doris Kenyon, Noah Beery, Betty Compson, and Leah Baird. Long after her last film in 1935, she appeared in a scene of Belles on Their Toes (1952), along with other silent film stars.

Pretty was considered a fashionable screen beauty. Her "hats and frocks" were described in detail, with diagrams and photographs, in a 1917 Harper's Bazaar feature, where she was described as "devoted to outdoor life" and "an expert horsewoman" who did her own on-screen stunts.

== Legacy ==
Pretty died in 1978, at the age of 92, at her home in Hollywood. A Woman in Grey (1920) was on the program of the Kansas Silent Film Festival in 2018. In 2022, a restored print of one of her later films, The Primrose Path (1925), was shown at the Museum of Modern Art's International Festival of Film Preservation and at the San Francisco Silent Film Festival, with live musical accompaniment.

== Selected filmography ==
- One Best Bet (1914)
- One Night (1915)
- The Man Who Found Himself (1915)
- The Dawn of Freedom (1916)
- The Thirteenth Girl (1916)
- The Surprises of an Empty Hotel (1916)
- In Again, Out Again (1917)
- The Hidden Hand (1917)
- The Challenge of Chance (1919)
- A Woman in Grey (1920)
- Life (1920)
- The Valley of Doubt (1920)
- When the Devil Drives (1922)
- Love in the Dark (1922)
- Stormswept (1923)
- The White Flower (1923)
- Bucking the Barrier (1923)
- Tipped Off (1923)
- Rouged Lips (1923)
- A Fool's Awakening (1924)
- Barriers Burned Away (1925)
- The Girl on the Stairs (1925)
- The Primrose Path (1925)
- Virgin Lips (1928)
- Shipmates Forever (1935)
- Belles on Their Toes (1952, cameo)
