= William Jefferson (actor) =

Silent film actor

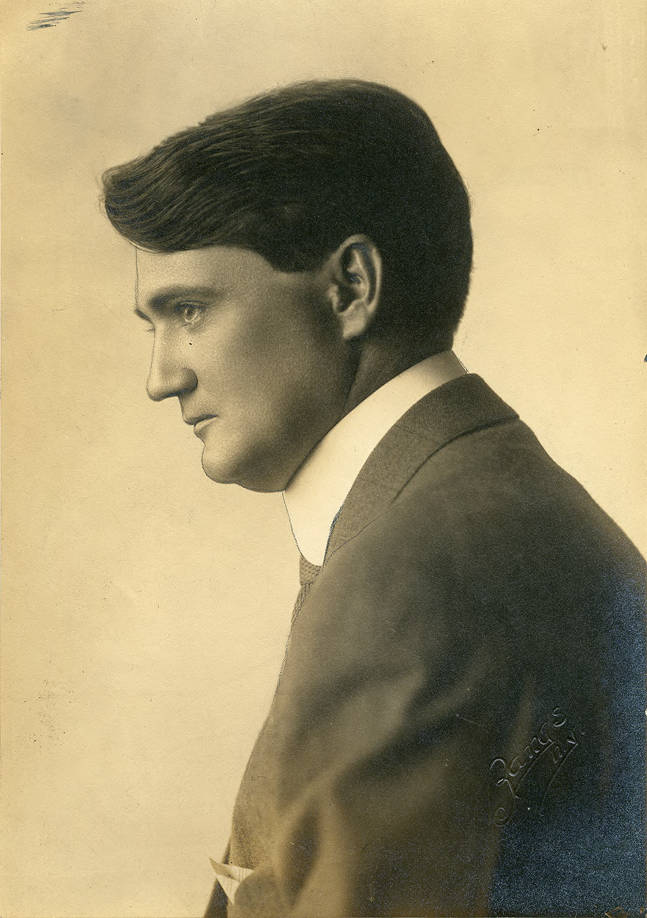
William Winter Jefferson

William Winter Jefferson (April 6, 1876 – February 11, 1946) was an actor in silent films.

== Early life ==
Jefferson was born in London to Sarah and Joseph Jefferson, an actor. He initially studied in Germany to become a medical doctor, but decided to pursue an acting career like his father, instead. He was elected to The Lambs in 1896.

== Career ==
Jefferson starred in the 1913 film Wanted by the Police, for which he earned positive reviews. He was one of the leads in the Keystone comedy Bright Lights.

== Personal life ==
He was married to actress Christie MacDonald, then to actress Vivian Martin in 1913. After retiring from acting, he moved to Honolulu, Hawaii, in 1928. He married his wife Mary in Honolulu in 1936.

== Death ==
Jefferson died in Honolulu, Hawaii, on February 11, 1946.

== Filmography ==
- Wanted by the Police (1913)
- Camille (1915)
- He Did and He Didn't (1916) as schoolmate
- The Habit of Happiness (1916) as Jones
- The Stronger Love (1916)
- The Right Direction (1916)
- The Other Man (1916)
- His Wife's Mistakes (1916)
- Bright Lights (1916)
- Her Own People (1917) as Blinn Agnew
- Out of the Wreck (1917)
- Marrying Money
- The Bright Lights (film)
