= The Dream Girl (film) =

1916 film

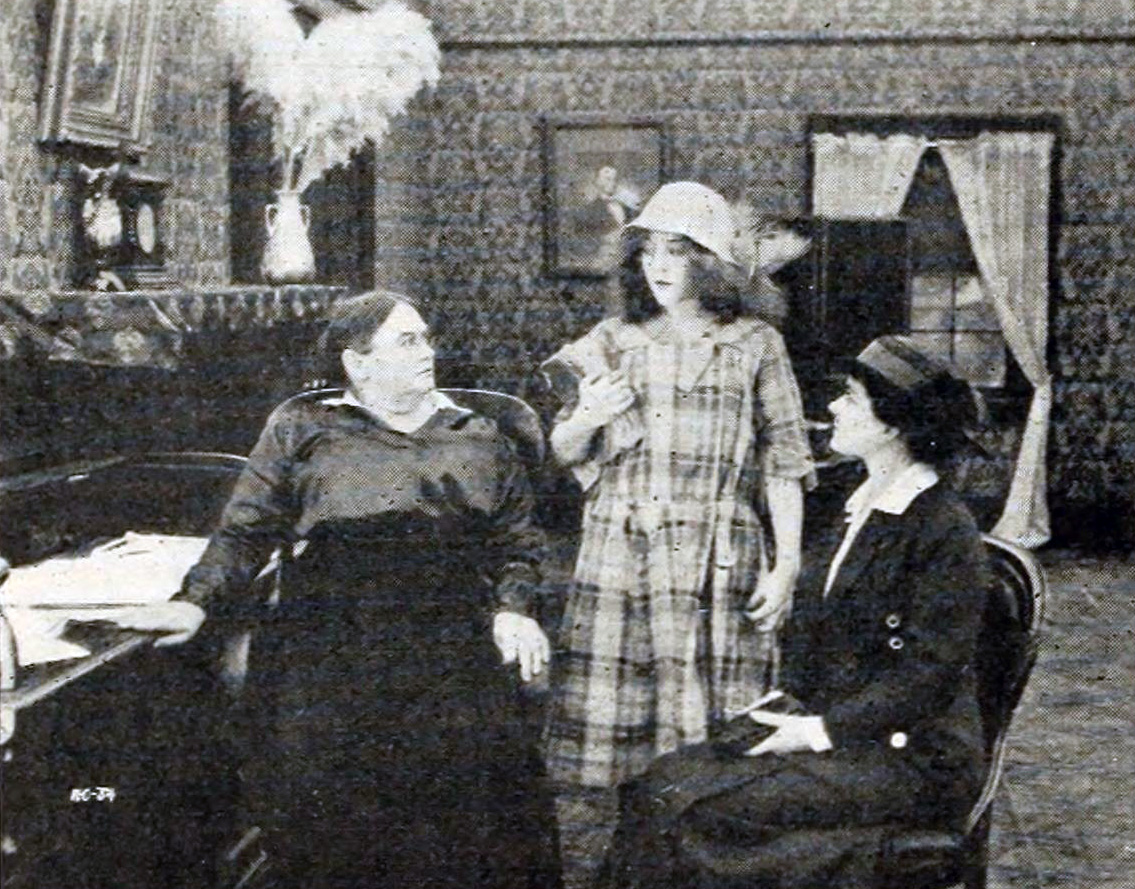
- Still from a 1916 issue of The Moving Picture World
- Directed by: Cecil B. DeMille
- Written by: Jeanie MacPherson
- Produced by: Cecil B. DeMille; Jesse L. Lasky
- Starring: Mae Murray
- Cinematography: Alvin Wyckoff
- Edited by: Cecil B. DeMille
- Production company: Jesse L. Lasky Feature Play Co.
- Distributed by: Paramount Pictures
- Release date: July 17, 1916
- Running time: 50 minutes (1500 m)
- Country: United States
- Language: Silent with English intertitles

The Dream Girl is a lost 1916 American silent drama film directed by Cecil B. DeMille. Based on an original story by DeMille writer Jeanie MacPherson, the film starred Mae Murray and Theodore Roberts.

== Cast ==
- Mae Murray as Meg Dugan
- Theodore Roberts as Jim Dugan
- Earle Foxe as Tom Merton
- James Neill as Benjamin Merton
- Charles West as Hal "English Hal"
- Mary Mersch as Alice Merton
- Mrs. Lewis McCord as Character Woman

== Preservation ==
With no prints of The Dream Girl located in any film archives, it is considered a lost film.

== See also ==
- List of lost films
