= Life (1920 film) =

1920 film

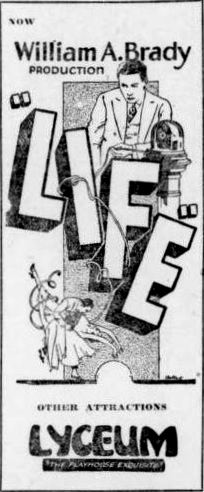
- Newspaper ad
- Directed by: Travers Vale
- Screenplay by: William A. Brady (story)
- Based on: Life by Thompson Buchanan
- Produced by: William A. Brady
- Starring: Nita Naldi; Hubert Druce; Jack Mower; J.H. Gilmour; Arline Pretty; Leeward Meeker
- Cinematography: Frank Kugler
- Production companies: William A. Brady Picture Plays; World Film
- Distributed by: Paramount Pictures
- Release date: November 13, 1920
- Running time: 50 minutes
- Country: United States
- Language: Silent (English intertitles)

Life is a lost 1920 American silent drama film directed by Travers Vale and written by William A. Brady based upon the play Life by Thompson Buchanan. The film stars Nita Naldi, Hubert Druce, Jack Mower, J.H. Gilmour, Arline Pretty, and Leeward Meeker. The film was released on November 13, 1920, by Paramount Pictures.

== Plot ==
As described in a film magazine, the film starts with an 8-oar shell race between college teams. Later, there is a prison escape from Sing Sing, and then a murder on the steps of St. Patrick's Cathedral on Fifth Avenue in New York City (filmed at the actual cathedral while the congregation was leaving mass). A priest and crowd gather around the dying man, and the priest takes his confession. There are several plot twists.

== Cast ==
- Nita Naldi as Grace Andrews
- Hubert Druce as Tom Andrews
- Jack Mower as Bill Reid
- J.H. Gilmour as William Stuyvesant
- Arline Pretty as Ruth Stuyvesant
- Leeward Meeker as Ralph Stuyvesant
- Rod La Rocque as Tom Burnett
- Edwin Stanley as Dennis O'Brien
- Curtis Cooksey as 'Bull' Anderson
- Geoffrey Stein as 'Dutch' Joe Schmidt
- Effingham Pinto as Monsignor Henri
