= The Parson of Panamint (1916 film) =

1916 film

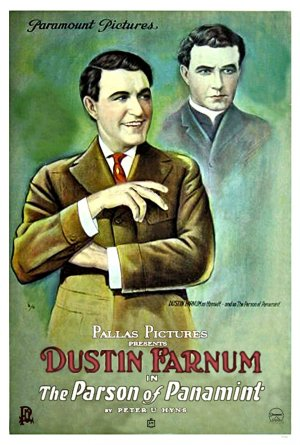
- Theatrical release poster
- Directed by: William Desmond Taylor
- Screenplay by: Julia Crawford Ivers; Peter B. Kyne
- Starring: Dustin Farnum; Winifred Kingston; Pomeroy Cannon; Howard Davies; Colin Chase; Ogden Crane
- Cinematography: Homer Scott
- Production company: Pallas Pictures
- Distributed by: Paramount Pictures
- Release date: September 3, 1916
- Running time: 50 minutes
- Country: United States
- Languages: Silent; English intertitles

The Parson of Panamint is a lost 1916 American silent Western film directed by William Desmond Taylor and written by Julia Crawford Ivers and Peter B. Kyne. The film stars Dustin Farnum, Winifred Kingston, Pomeroy Cannon, Howard Davies, Colin Chase and Ogden Crane. The film was released on September 3, 1916, by Paramount Pictures.

== Cast ==
- Dustin Farnum as Philip Pharo
- Winifred Kingston as Buckskin Liz
- Pomeroy Cannon as Chuckawalla Bill
- Howard Davies as Bud Deming
- Colin Chase as Chappie Ellerton
- Ogden Crane as Absolom Randall
- Jane Keckley as Arabella Randall
- Tom Bates as Crabapple Thompson
