= Lalo Encinas =

American character actor

- Encinas in Call of the Wild, 1935
- Born: Ladislao Encinas; June 27, 1886; Pima, Arizona Territory, U.S.
- Died: May 5, 1959 (aged 72); Los Angeles County, California, U.S.
- Occupation: Character actor

Ladislao "Lalo" Encinas (June 27, 1886 – May 5, 1959) was an American character actor active in Hollywood from the 1910s through the 1950s.

He was noted as one of few Apache actors working in the motion picture industry by contemporaneous reporters, though according to census records, it appears he was of mestizo or indigenous Mexican ancestry.

== Biography ==
Encinas was born in Pima, Arizona. His parents were Jesus Encinas and Jacinta Bustamant, both from Mexico. Eventually he went to Hollywood and began working as an actor. He was noted for his tall stature, as he reportedly was six feet, four inches tall, and weighted 280 pounds.

Encinas died on May 5, 1959 in Los Angeles County, California, at the age of 72.

== Filmography ==
Year	Title	Role	Notes
1923	The Planter	Magdaleno	
1923	The Lone Horseman		
1923	Snowdrift	Joe Pete	
1923	The Huntress	Beavertail	
1930	Only the Brave	Gen. Grant's Secretary	
1933	Flying Down to Rio	Lackey	Uncredited
1934	The Cat's-Paw	Chinese Guard	Uncredited
1934	Kid Millions	Warrior	Uncredited
1935	Call of the Wild	Kali	
1936	Rose of the Rancho	Overseer	Uncredited
1937	Waikiki Wedding	Policeman	Uncredited
1937	San Quentin	Convict	Uncredited
1941	Hurry, Charlie, Hurry	Frozen Foot	
1943	Adventure in Iraq	Iraqi Guard	Uncredited
1948	Mexican Hayride	Mexican Man	Uncredited
1950	Young Daniel Boone	Shawnee Chief	Uncredited, (final film role)
