= Bucking the Barrier =

1923 film

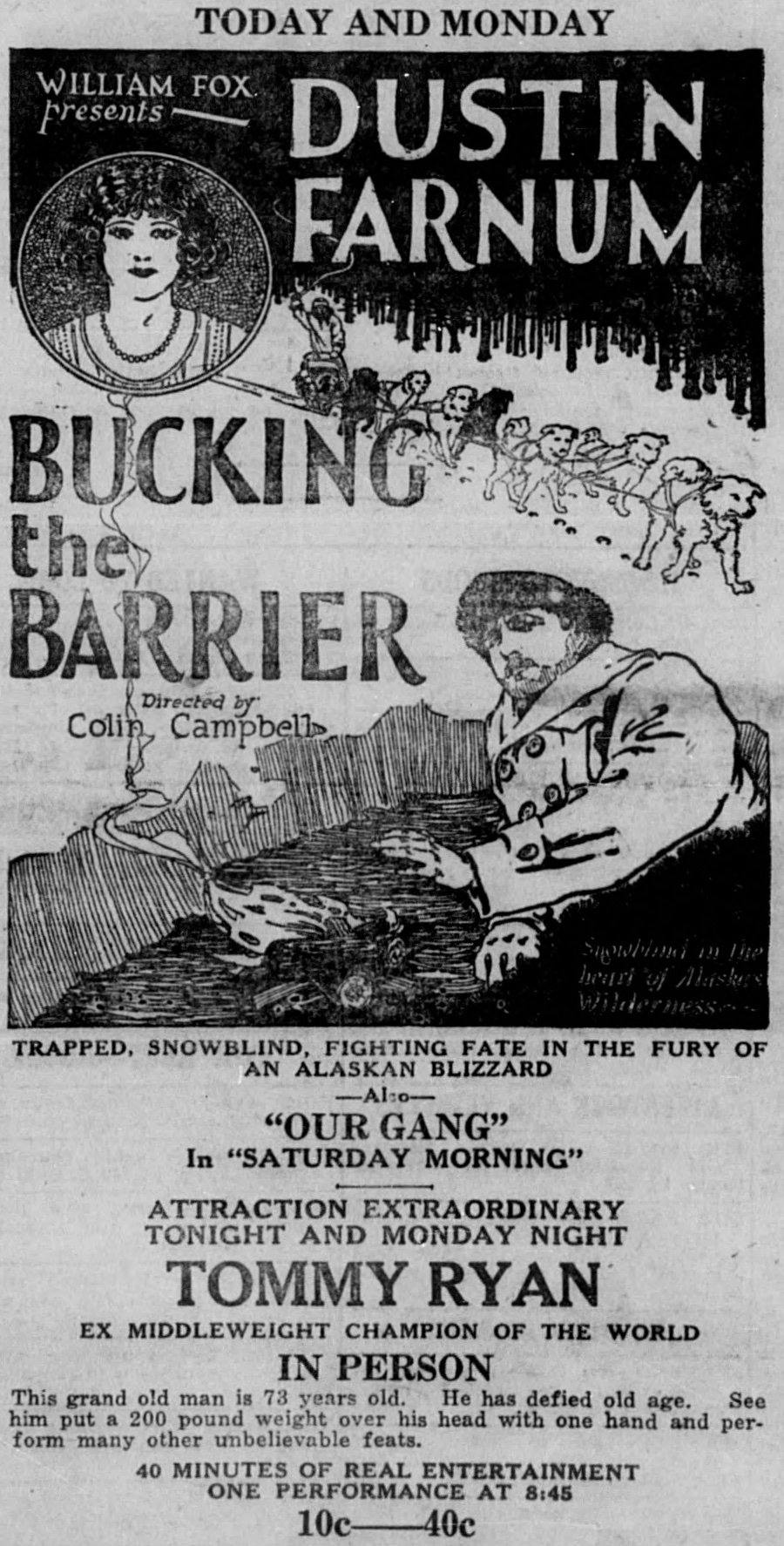
- Contemporary advertisement
- Directed by: Colin Campbell
- Screenplay by: John Stone
- Story by: George Goodchild
- Starring: Dustin Farnum; Arline Pretty; Léon Bary; Colin Chase; Hayford Hobbs; Sidney D'Albrook
- Cinematography: Lucien Andriot
- Production company: Fox Film Corporation
- Distributed by: Fox Film Corporation
- Release date: April 1, 1923
- Running time: 50 minutes
- Country: United States
- Language: English

Bucking the Barrier is a 1923 American drama film directed by Colin Campbell and written by John Stone. The film stars Dustin Farnum, Arline Pretty, Léon Bary, Colin Chase, Hayford Hobbs and Sidney D'Albrook. The film was released on April 1, 1923, by Fox Film Corporation.

== Cast ==
- Dustin Farnum as Kit Carew
- Arline Pretty as Blanche Cavendish
- Léon Bary as Luke Cavendish
- Colin Chase as Frank Farfax
- Hayford Hobbs as Cyril Cavendish
- Sidney D'Albrook as Tyson

== Preservation ==
With no prints of Bucking the Barrier located in any film archives, it is considered a lost film.
