= The White Flower =

1923 film

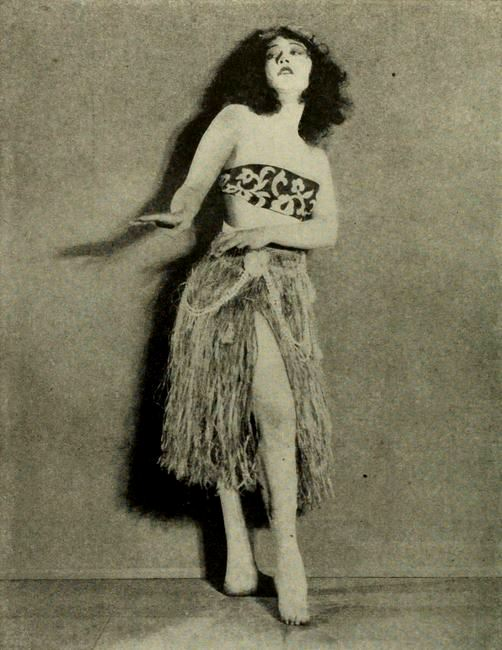
- Film still with Compson
- Directed by: Julia Crawford Ivers
- Written by: Julia Crawford Ivers
- Produced by: Adolph Zukor; Jesse Lasky
- Cinematography: James Van Trees
- Production company: Famous Players–Lasky
- Distributed by: Paramount Pictures
- Release date: March 4, 1923
- Running time: 6 reels; (5,731 feet)
- Country: United States
- Language: Silent (English intertitles)

The White Flower is a 1923 American silent romantic drama film written and directed by Julia Crawford Ivers and starring Betty Compson and Edmund Lowe. Ivers' son, James Van Trees, was the film's cinematographer. Set in Hawaii, the film was shot on location in Honolulu.

== Cast ==
- Betty Compson as Konia Markham
- Edmund Lowe as Bob Rutherford
- Edward Martindel as John Markham
- Arline Pretty as Ethel Granville
- Sylvia Ashton as Mrs. Gregory Bolton
- Arthur Hoyt as Gregory Bolton
- Leon Barry as David Panuahi
- Lily Philips as Bernice Martin
- Reginald Carter as Edward Graeme
- Maui Kaito as Kahuna

== Preservation ==
The White Flower is currently presumed lost. In February of 2021, the film was cited by the National Film Preservation Board on their Lost U.S. Silent Feature Films list.

== See also ==
- Hula (1927)
- South Seas genre
- List of lost films
