= Irene Wallace =

American actress

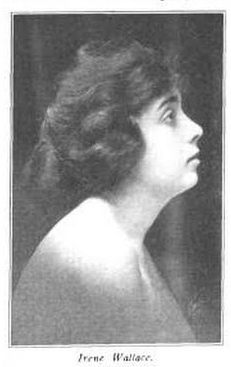
- Irene Wallace, from a 1915 publication
- Born: August 13, 1898; New York City, U.S.
- Died: June 10, 1977 (aged 78); Los Angeles, California, U.S.
- Occupation: Actress

Irene Wallace (August 13, 1898 – June 10, 1977) was an American actress in silent films and on the vaudeville stage.

== Biography ==
Wallace, who was born in New York City, was considered a comic beauty, and appeared on vaudeville programs as a child and young woman. She had roles in dozens of silent films, mostly shorts, beginning with Conscience (1913), and ending in 1922 with Forsaking All Others. She frequently appeared opposite Walter Miller. Wallace died in 1977, at the age of 78, in Los Angeles, California.

== Filmography ==
- Traffic in Souls (1913)
- Bleeding Hearts (1913)
- His Wife's Child (1913)
- Simple Faith (1914)
- A Beggar Prince of India (1914)
- The Old Parlor (1914)
- Enmeshed by Fate (1914)
- Irene's Busy Week (1914)
- The Temptation of Jane (1914)
- Broken Vows (1914)
- The Coast Guard's Bride (1914)
- A Dangerous Experiment (1914)
- All on Account of a Photo (1915)
- The Beautiful Unknown (1915)
- The Other Man (1916)
- The Lost City (1920)
- Miracles of the Jungle (1921)
- Forsaking All Others (1922)
