= The Spirit of Romance (film) =

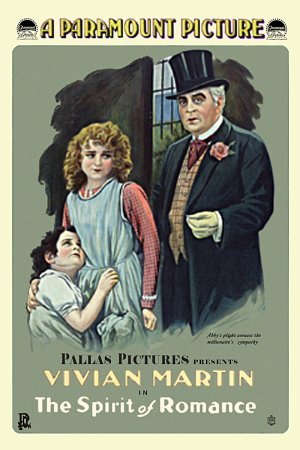
- Theatrical release poster
- Directed by: E. Mason Hopper
- Screenplay by: Adele Harris; George S. Hopkins
- Starring: Vivian Martin; Percy Challenger; Colin Chase; Herbert Standing; Elinor Hancock; George Fisher
- Cinematography: James Van Trees
- Production company: Pallas Pictures
- Distributed by: Paramount Pictures
- Release date: March 22, 1917
- Running time: 50 minutes
- Country: United States
- Language: Silent. English intertitles

The Spirit of Romance is a lost 1917 American drama silent film directed by E. Mason Hopper, written by Adele Harris and George S. Hopkins, and starring Vivian Martin, Percy Challenger, Colin Chase, Herbert Standing, Elinor Hancock and George Fisher. It was released on March 22, 1917, by Paramount Pictures.

== Cast ==
- Vivian Martin as Abby Lou Maynard
- Percy Challenger as Richard Cobb
- Colin Chase as Tom Cobb
- Herbert Standing as Joseph Snow
- Elinor Hancock as Mrs. Rollins
- George Fisher as Percival Rollins
- Daisy Jefferson as Marguerite D'Arcy
- Doc Crane as Mace
- John Burton
