= Scott Sidney =

American film director

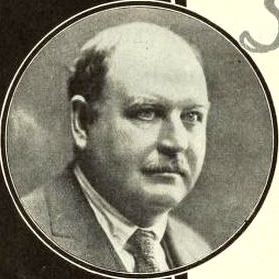
- Sidney in 1921
- Born: Harry Wilbur Siggins; 1872
- Died: July 20, 1928 (aged 55–56); London, UK

Scott Sidney (1872 – 20 July 1928), born Harry Wilbur Siggins, was an American film director. He directed 117 films between 1913 and 1927.

He died in London, England, United Kingdom.

Comedy Beans for Two (1918) by Scott Sidney for Strand Film. A farce in which a couple unwittingly save up money for the same thing. Collection EYE Film Institute Netherlands.

== Selected filmography ==
Silent film Somebody's Widow (1918) by director Scott Sidney for Strand Film. Running time: 14:58. A comedy in which the widow Mary makes a bet with her friends that she can win over a writer named Jack. Collection EYE Film Institute Netherlands.

=== Director ===
- The Adventures of Shorty (1914)
- The Winged Idol (1915)
- The Toast of Death (1915) (uncredited)
- The Green Swamp (1916)
- The Road to Love (1916)
- Tarzan of the Apes (1918)
- 813 (1920)
- The Adventures of Tarzan (1921)
- Call the Wagon (1923)
- Reckless Romance (1924)
- Hold Your Breath (1924)
- Charley's Aunt (1925)
- Madame Behave (1925)
- Stop Flirting (1925)
- The Million Dollar Handicap (1925)
- Seven Days (1925)
- The Nervous Wreck (1926)
- The Wrong Mr. Wright (1927)
- No Control (1927)

=== Screenwriter ===
- Alf's Carpet (1929)
