= James Hendryx =

American novelist

James B. Hendryx
- Born: December 9, 1880; Sauk Centre, Minnesota, US
- Died: March 1, 1963 (aged 82); Traverse City, Michigan, US
- Occupation: Writer (novelist)
- Writing career
- Period: 20th century
- Genre: Western

James Beardsley Hendryx (December 9, 1880 – March 1, 1963) was an American author of western fiction.

== Life and career ==
James Hendryx was born in Sauk Centre, Minnesota in 1880. He attended local schools in Sauk Centre and went to the University of Minneapolis for two years. He worked as a newspaperman in Springfield, Ohio and was a special writer for the Cincinnati Enquirer. He also worked various jobs including as a salesman, tan bark buyer, cowboy, and construction foreman.

He was a prolific writer, finishing over 40 novels, several short stories, and one screenplay. All of his work was in the western fiction genre. He set most of his books in Canada, Alaska, or Montana. His novels portrayed Canada as a lawful and orderly place with reliable police and a civilized court system. He compared this unfavorably to Alaska and Montana as relatively lawless places where criminals could find a safe haven.

Many of his books were parts of series. He wrote a series of books based on Corporal Downey of the Northwest Mounted Police. Another series centred on Halfaday Creek and he wrote a series of juvenile books called the Connie Morgan series.

He married Hermione Flagler in 1915. They had a daughter, Hermione, born in 1918, a daughter, Betty, born in 1921 and a son, James, born UKN. He died in Traverse City, Michigan at the age of 82.

== Works ==
- The Promise: A Tale Of The Great Northwest (1915)
- Connie Morgan In Alaska (1916)
- The Gun-Brand: A Feud Of The Frozen North (1917)
- The Texan: A Story Of The Cattle Country (1918)
- Connie Morgan In The Lumber Camps (1919)
- The Gold Girl (1920)
- Prairie Flowers (1920)
- Connie Morgan In The Fur Country (1921)
- Snowdrift: A Story Of The Land Of The Strong Cold (1922)
- North (1923)
- The One Big Thing (1923)
- Connie Morgan In The Cattle Country (1923)
- Marquard The Silent (1924)
- At The Foot Of The Rainbow (1924)
- Beyond The Outposts (1924)
- Without Gloves (1924)
- A Challenge Of The North (1925)
- Oak And Iron: Of These Be The Breed Of The North (1925)
- Downey Of The Mounted (1926)
- Frozen Inlet Post (1927)
- Gold - And The Mounted (1928)
- Man Of The North (1929)
- Blood On The Yukon Trail (title in UK: In The Days Of Gold / Devil's Gold) (1930)
- Corporal Downey Takes The Trail (1931)
- Raw Gold (1933)
- The Yukon Kid (1934)
- Outlaws Of Halfaday Creek (1935)
- Grubstake Gold (also titled: Death Heads North) (1936)
- Blood Of The North (1938)
- Edge Of Beyond (1939)
- Black John Of Halfaday Creek (1939)
- Hard Rock Man (1940)
- The Czar Of Halfaday Creek (1940)
- Gambler's Chance (1941)
- Law And Order On Halfaday Creek (1941)
- New Rivers Calling (1943)
- Gold And Guns On Halfaday Creek (1943)
- Strange Doings On Halfaday Creek (1943)
- It Happened On Halfaday Creek (1944)
- The Way Of The North (1945)
- Courage Of The North (1946)
- Skullduggery On Halfaday Creek (1946)
- The Saga Of Halfaday Creek (1947)
- On The Rim Of The Arctic (1948)
- Murder In The Outlands (1949)
- Justice On Halfaday Creek (1949)
- Badmen On Halfaday Creek (1950)
- The Stampeders (1951)
- Murder On Halfaday Creek (1951)
- Sourdough Gold (1952)
- The Long Chase (1952)
- Gold Is Where You Find It (1953)
- Intrigue On Halfaday Creek (1953)
- Good Men And Bad (1954)
- Terror On Halfaday Creek (1963)
