= Julia Crawford Ivers =

American film director

- Born: Julia Crawford; October 3, 1869; Boonville, Missouri, United States
- Died: May 8, 1930 (aged 60); Los Angeles, California, United States
- Occupations: Director; producer; writer
- Years active: 1915–1927
- Spouse(s): Franklin S. Van Trees (1 child); Oliver Ivers (m. 1900-1902; his death)
- Parent(s): James and Laura (née Benedict) Crawford
- Relatives: James Van Trees (son)

Julia Crawford Ivers (October 3, 1869 – May 8, 1930) was an American motion picture pioneer.

== Biography ==
Born in Boonville, Missouri in 1869, her family arrived a year later in Los Angeles. Her father was a dentist. Her mother died in 1876, when Julia was age 7. Julia's sister Grace died at age 14. Ivers watched the film industry come into existence and establish itself in southern California. She participated in the new industry as writer, producer and director.

She and her husband Franklin S. Van Trees (aka Frank Van Trees 1866 – 1914), a famed "society" architect best known for his mansions in Pacific Heights, San Francisco], had a son, James Van Trees (1890 – 1973), who became a popular cinematographer for Paramount Pictures and Warner Bros. and shot some of his mother's films. Ivers later worked with director William Desmond Taylor and was reportedly a part of his inner circle before his murder. Her extremely wealthy second husband was Oliver Ivers (who died in 1902, two years after their marriage).

== Death ==
Julia Crawford Ivers died in Los Angeles in 1930, aged 60, from stomach cancer.

== Selected filmography ==
- The Heart of Paula (1916, director, writer, story)
- The American Beauty (1916, lost film)
- The Intrigue (1916, writer)
- The Call of the Cumberlands (1916, writer)
- David Garrick (1916)
- A Son of Erin (1916, director, writer, print: Library of Congress)
- The World Apart (1917)
- Sauce for the Goose (1918)
- Widow by Proxy (1919)
- Huckleberry Finn (1920, writer)
- Nurse Marjorie (1920, writer)
- Jenny Be Good (1920, writer)
- The Furnace (1920)
- Sacred and Profane Love (1921, writer)
- Wealth (1921)
- Beyond (1921, story, scenario)
- The White Flower (1923, director, writer)
- Married Flirts (1924, writer)
