= The Virginian (play) =

1903 play by Owen Wister and Kirke La Shelle

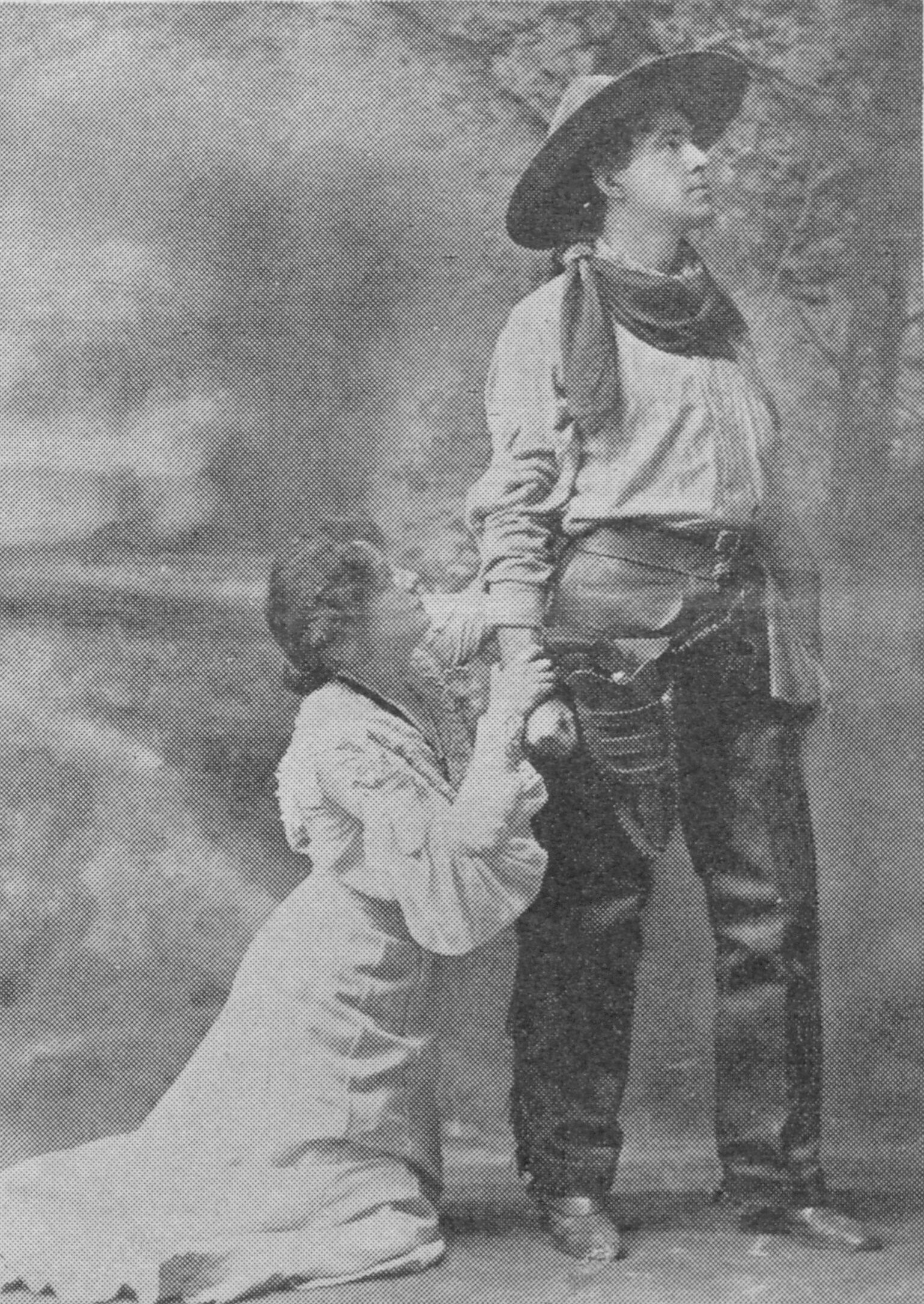
Scene from a 1905 touring production starring Dustin Farnum and Helen Holmes

The Virginian is a 1903 stage production based on the 1902 novel The Virginian by the American author Owen Wister (1860–1938) and set in Wyoming. The play was composed by Wister and playwright Kirke La Shelle, who also produced it. The story describes the life of a cowboy on a cattle ranch in northern Wyoming, where he tends cattle, identifies and hangs a rustler, kills a notorious bad guy, woos and finally marries a school teacher who had come to Wyoming from the East.

== Productions ==
The earliest known production of The Virginian was at Boston's Majestic Theatre in October 1903. The Boston booking was apparently intended as a dry run before taking the play to Broadway. It opened on Broadway in New York at the Manhattan Theatre on January 5, 1904, and ran until May 1904. Most of the actors who appeared in Boston were also in the Broadway production a few months later. The lead was played by Dustin Farnum who continued the role in New York. Molly Wood, the heroine, was well-acted by Nanette Comstock in Boston, but Agnes Ardeck apparently did a poorer job in New York. Other actors in both plays include Frank Campeau who played "Trampas"; Joseph A. Maylon playing "John Taylor"; and Thomas P. Jackson who played "Andrew Dow/Shorty".

The play was reprised in October 1905 for 16 performances at the Academy of Music in New York City.

There is some evidence that the play may have once been intended as a musical, for the song "Dead Broke!" is linked with it. However, none of the plays' reviews mention singing.

== Adaptations ==
The play, more than the book, served as the basis for a number of film adaptations of The Virginian. Indeed, Dustin Farnum, who starred in all three runs of the play, also starred in the earliest film version.

In 2022 playwrights L.C Bernadine and Spencer Huffman newly adapted the novel for City Lit Theater in Chicago. The production opened on January 16, 2022 for a 5-week run.

== Films ==
- The Virginian (1914 film) directed by Cecil B. DeMille, with Dustin Farnum
- The Virginian (1923 film) with Kenneth Harlan and Florence Vidor
- The Virginian (1929 film) with Gary Cooper and Walter Huston
- The Virginian (1946 film) with Joel McCrea and Brian Donlevy
