= 2009 in public domain =

When a work's copyright expires, it enters the public domain. The following is a list of works that entered the public domain in 2009. Since laws vary globally, the copyright status of some works are not uniform.

== Entered the public domain in countries with life + 70 years ==
With the exception of Belarus (Life + 50 years) and Spain (Life + 80 years for creators that died before 1987), a work enters the public domain in Europe 70 years after the creator's death, if it was published during the creator's lifetime. The list is sorted alphabetically and includes a notable work of the creator that entered the public domain on January 1, 2009.

Names	Country	Birth	Death	Occupation	Notable work
Lascelles Abercrombie	United Kingdom	9 January 1881	27 October 1938	literary critic, poet.	An Essay Towards a Theory of Art, Poetry, Its Music and Meaning
Karel Čapek	Czech Republic	9 January 1890	25 December 1938	science fiction writer, playwright	R.U.R. (Rossum's Universal Robots), War with the Newts
Sarat Chandra Chattopadhyay	India	15 September 1876	16 January 1938	short story writer, novelist.	Parineeta, Devdas
Afonso Celso de Assis Figueiredo Júnior	Brazil	31 March 1860	11 July 1938	educator, poet and historian	Works
Émile Cohl	France	4 January 1857	20 January 1938	Caricaturist, cartoonist and animator	
Gabriele D'Annunzio	Italy	12 March 1863	1 March 1938	novelist, playwright, poet.	Il Piacere (Pleasure), The Intruder, Il trionfo della morte (Triumph of Death)
Ovid Densusianu	Romania	29 December 1873	9 June 1938	folklorist, linguist, literary historian, philologist, poet.	Istoria literaturii române, Histoire de la langue roumaine
Paola Drigo	Italy	4 January 1876	4 January 1938	short story writer, novelist.	Fine d'anno, Maria Zef
James Forbes	Canada	2 September 1871	26 May 1938	playwright, screenwriter.	The Chorus Lady, The Famous Mrs. Fair
Robert Herrick	United States	21 April 1868	23 December 1938	novelist.	Web of Life
James Weldon Johnson	United States	17 June 1876	26 June 1938	anthologist, novelist, poet.	"Lift Every Voice and Sing", The Autobiography of an Ex-Colored Man
Willem Kloos	Netherlands	6 May 1859	31 March 1938	literary critic, poet.	editor of De Nieuwe Gids (The New Guide)
E. V. Lucas	United Kingdom	11 June 1868	26 June 1938	biographer, essayist, humorist, novelist, playwright, poet, short story writer.	What a Life!
Osip Mandelstam	Russia	14 January 1891	27 December 1938	poet.	Puteshestviye v Armeniyu (Journey to Armenia), Razgovor o Dante (Conversation about Dante)
Georges Méliès	France	8 December 1861	21 January 1938	Film director	A Trip to the Moon, The Impossible Voyage, The Merry Frolics of Satan and The Conquest of the Pole
Migjeni	Albania	13 October 1911	26 August 1938	poet.	Trajtat e Mbinjeriut (The shape of the Superman), Kanga skandaloze (Scandalous song)
Lady Ottoline Morrell	United Kingdom	16 June 1873	21 April 1938	memoirist, patron of the arts.	two volumes of memoirs
Momčilo Nastasijević	Serbia	23 September 1894	13 February 1938	dramatist, novelist, poet.	The Unevoked, Master Mladen's Daughter
Henry Newbolt	United Kingdom	6 June 1862	19 April 1938	historian, novelist, poet.	Vitaï Lampada (the torch of life), Drake's Drum
Branislav Nušić	Serbia	20 October 1864	19 January 1938	playwright, essayist, novelist.	A Member of the Parliament, A Suspicious Person
Gustave Le Rouge	France	22 July 1867	24 February 1938	Author	The Vampires of Mars
Olivia Shakespear	United Kingdom	17 March 1863	3 October 1938	novelist, playwright, patron of the arts.	Love on a Mortal Lease, Uncle Hilary
Konstantin Stanislavski	Russia	17 January 1863	7 August 1938	acting theorist.	My Life in Art
Wage Rudolf Soepratman	Indonesia	9 March 1903	17 August 1938	composer, journalist, teacher	Di Timur Matahari, Indonesia Raya, Ibu Kita Kartini
E. G. Swain	United Kingdom	19 February 1861	29 January 1938	Author	The Stoneground Ghost Tales
Armando Palacio Valdés	Spain	4 October 1853	29 January 1938	novelist.	The Joy of Captain Ribot
Owen Wister	United States	14 July 1860	21 July 1938	biographer, historian, Western fiction writer	The Virginian, Ulysses S. Grant, Roosevelt: The Story of a Friendship
Thomas Wolfe	United States	3 October 1900	15 September 1938	short story writer, novelist	Look Homeward, Angel, You Can't Go Home Again

== Entered the public domain in countries with life + 50 years ==
In most countries of Africa and Asia, as well as Belarus, Bolivia, Canada, New Zealand, Egypt and Uruguay; a work enters the public domain 50 years after the creator's death.

Names	Country	Birth	Death	Occupation	Notable work
Eleanor Hallowell Abbott	United States	22 September 1872	4 June 1958	novelist, poet, short story writer.	Molly Make-Believe, But Once A Year: Christmas Stories
James Branch Cabell	United States	14 April 1879	5 May 1958	fantasy writer.	Jurgen, A Comedy of Justice, Biography of the Life of Manuel
E. Everett Evans	United States	30 November 1893	2 December 1958	Science fiction author	
Margiad Evans	United Kingdom	17 March 1909	17 March 1958	illustrator, novelist, poet.	Country Dance, Autobiography, A Ray of Darkness, The Nightingale Silenced
Dorothy Canfield Fisher	United States	17 February 1879	9 November 1958	literary critic, memoirist, novelist, short story writer, translator.	Understood Betsy
Marjorie Flack	United States	22 October 1897	29 August 1958	children's writer, illustrator.	writer of The Story About Ping, illustrator of The Country Bunny and the Little Gold Shoes
Angelina Weld Grimké	United States	27 February 1880	10 June 1958	playwright, poet.	Rachel
Michael Joseph	United Kingdom	26 September 1897	15 March 1958	Writer, publisher.	How to Write Serial Fiction, Puss in Books: A collection of stories about cats, The Sword in the Scabbard
Cyril M. Kornbluth	United States	2 July 1923	21 March 1958	science fiction writer	The Little Black Bag, The Marching Morons
Henry Kuttner	United States	7 April 1915	3 February 1958	Writer of fantasy, horror fiction, and science fiction.	The Graveyard Rats, Mimsy Were the Borogoves
Rose Macaulay	United Kingdom	1 August 1881	30 October 1958	biographer, novelist, travel writer.	The World My Wilderness, The Towers of Trebizond
Johnston McCulley	United States	2 February 1883	23 November 1958	Author	Zorro
G. E. Moore	United Kingdom	4 November 1873	24 October 1958	journal editor, philosopher.	Principia Ethica, A Defence of Common Sense
Charles Langbridge Morgan	United Kingdom	22 January 1894	6 February 1958	novelist, playwright.	The Burning Glass
Alfred Noyes	United Kingdom	16 September 1880	25 June 1958	playwright, poet, short story writer.	The Highwayman, Shakespeare's Kingdom
Seumas O'Sullivan	Ireland	17 July 1879	24 March 1958	magazine editor, poet.	Twilight People, Verses Sacred and Profane
Elliot Paul	United States	10 February 1891	7 April 1958	journalist, novelist, screenwriter.	Life and Death of a Spanish Town, Linden on the Saugus Branch
H. G. Peter	United States	8 March 1880	2 January 1958	Cartoonist	Wonder Woman
Nicolae Petrescu-Comnen	Romania	24 August 1881	8 December 1958	social scientist.	Accidente profesionale (Work-related Accidents), Câteva considerațiuni asupra socialismului și asupra roadelor sale (Some Musings on Socialism and Its Results
Peig Sayers	Ireland	1873	8 December 1958	seanchaí (traditional Gaelic storyteller and historian).	Peig, Machnamh Seanmhná (An Old Woman's Reflections)
Robert W. Service	Canada	16 January 1874	11 September 1958	poet.	The Shooting of Dan McGrew, The Cremation of Sam McGee
J. C. Squire	United Kingdom	2 April 1884	20 December 1958	historian, literary critic, magazine editor, poet.	Robin Hood: a farcical romantic pastoral , Shakespeare as a Dramatist
Ethel Turner	Australia	24 January 1870	8 April 1958	children's writer, novelist.	Seven Little Australians
Geoffrey Willans	United Kingdom	4 February 1911	6 August 1958	children's writer, humorist, novelist, screenwriter.	Down with Skool! A Guide to School Life for Tiny Pupils and their Parents, Whizz for Atomms: A Guide to Survival in the 20th Century for Fellow Pupils, their Doting Maters, Pompous Paters and Any Others who are Interested
Harry Cohn	United States	23 July 1891	27 February 1958	Filmmaker	

== Entering the public domain in the United States ==
In the United States, the copyright status of works extends for the life of the author or artists, plus 70 years. If the work is owned by a corporation, then the copyright extends 95 years.

Due to the passing of the Copyright Term Extension Act (Sonny Bono Copyright Term Extension Act) in 1998, works never registered or published before January 1, 1978, and whose authors died before 1939 entered the public domain in this jurisdiction on January 1, 2009. Other works would not enter the public domain here until 2019.

== Worldwide ==
In March 2009, the CC0-license or Creative Commons 0-license is introduced. It is a universal waiver of copyright that can be used when copyright owners want to permanently surrender rights they may have in a work, thereby placing the work into the public domain.

The Creative Commons published the study Defining "Noncommercial": A Study of How the Online Population Understands "Noncommercial Use." directly into the public domain through a CC0-license.

== See also ==
- 1908 in literature and 1958 in literature for deaths of writers
- Public Domain Day
- Creative Commons
