= The Virginian (1929 film) =

1929 film

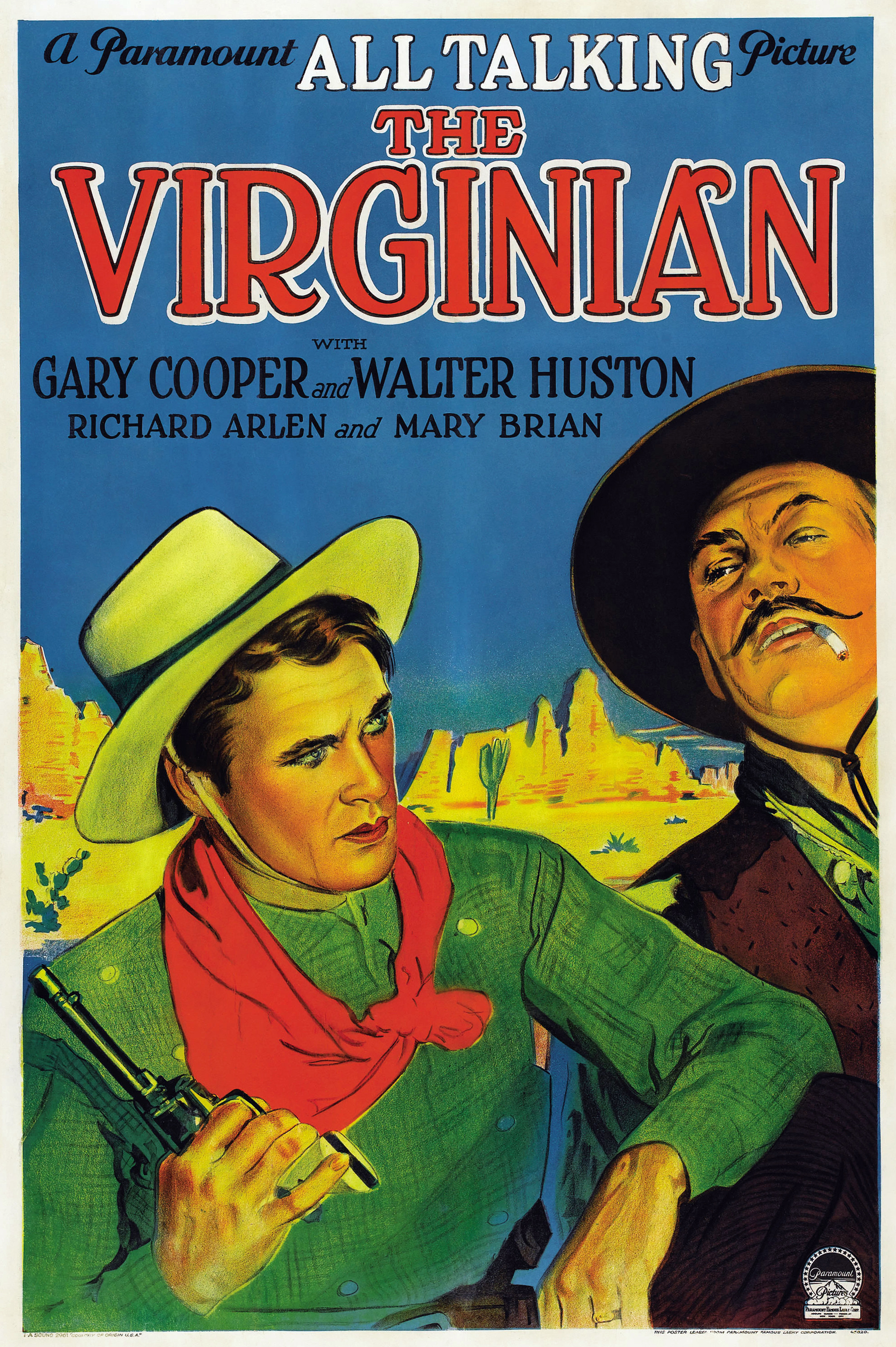
- Theatrical release poster
- Directed by: Victor Fleming
- Written by: Kirk LaShelle; Grover Jones; Howard Estabrook; Keene Thompson; Edward E. Paramore Jr.
- Based on: The Virginian (novel) by Owen Wister
- Produced by: B. P. Schulberg; Louis D. Lighton
- Starring: Gary Cooper; Walter Huston; Richard Arlen
- Cinematography: J. Roy Hunt; Edward Cronjager
- Edited by: William Shea
- Music by: Karl Hajos
- Distributed by: Paramount Pictures
- Release date: November 9, 1929 (US)
- Running time: 91 minutes
- Country: United States
- Language: English sound film

The Virginian (1929)

The Virginian is a 1929 American pre-Code Western film directed by Victor Fleming and starring Gary Cooper, Walter Huston, and Richard Arlen. The film was based on the 1902 novel The Virginian by Owen Wister and adapted from the popular 1904 theatrical play Wister had collaborated on with playwright Kirke La Shelle.

The Virginian is about a good-natured cowboy who romances the new schoolmarm and has a crisis of conscience when he learns his best friend is involved in cattle rustling. The film is considered to be Gary Cooper's breakthrough role and is well known for Cooper's line "If you wanna call me that—smile", in response to an insult by the antagonist.

== Plot ==
A man known only as the Virginian is ranch foreman at Box H Ranch near Medicine Bow, Wyoming. At a saloon in Medicine Bow, he and the cattle rustler Trampas vie for the attentions of a barmaid; when Trampas insults him, the Virginian pulls a gun and tells him to smile. Soon afterwards, Molly Wood, a new schoolteacher from Vermont, arrives in town. The Virginian and a drifter named Steve compete for her attentions. She ultimately chooses Steve, but the Virginian gives him a job at the ranch because they were friends in childhood. Unhappy with the Virginian's violent nature, Molly tries to change him but is unsuccessful.

Steve and the Virginian enjoy playing pranks together, switching babies during a baptism; they also make quail calls for secret communications. However, Steve falls in with Trampas' gang. Although warned by the Virginian that no good will come of it, Steve continues with the gang. When they (except Trampas) steal cattle from Box H Ranch, the Virginian is forced to hang all involved, including Steve. The Virginian vows revenge on Trampas for forcing him to do so.

Molly is disgusted by The Virginian's callousness, but after he is shot in the back by Trampas, she decides to treat him, they fall in love, and eventually decide to marry. On their wedding day, Trampas comes back to town for revenge and challenges the Virginian to a shoot-out. The Virginian quickly draws his friend's six-shooter and kills the bandit in the streets. He then marries Molly, and the two prepare to open their own ranch.

== Cast ==
- Willie Fung as Hong (uncredited)
- Gary Cooper as The Virginian
- Walter Huston as Trampas
- Richard Arlen as Steve
- Mary Brian as Molly Stark Wood
- Chester Conklin as Uncle "Pa" Hughey
- Eugene Pallette as "Honey" Wiggin
- Victor Potel as Nebrasky
- E. H. Calvert as Judge Henry
- Helen Ware as Mrs "Ma" Taylor
- George Chandler as "Bug Ears"
- Randolph Scott as Rider (uncredited)
- Nina Quartero as Girl In Bar (uncredited)

== Production ==
The Virginian was based on the 1902 novel of the same name written by Owen Wister and its 1904 stage play adaptation. This was the first sound adaptation of the novel, with two silent film adaptations released in 1914 and 1923. The film was not entirely faithful to the book.

The film was directed by Victor Fleming; it was his first sound film. Gary Cooper, who had appeared in several silent films, was cast as the Virginian; it was his first leading role in a western and his first sound film. He was coached in the Virginian's accent by Randolph Scott.

Production began in late May 1929, with shooting done in Sonora, California and Lone Pine, California. The railroad scenes were filmed on the Sierra Railway at Cooperstown near Oakdale in Stanislaus County, California. There was little studio shooting. To shoot outdoor scenes, the filmmakers used blimped cameras (cameras with internal soundproofing), which were a recent innovation.

The film featured the traditional song "Bury Me Not on the Lone Prairie", hummed and sung by Richard Arlen.

== Techniques and style ==
Rather than synchronize every sound on screen with a shown action, The Virginian treated sound as at times being independent of the action; this allowed for greater symbolism. The film also heavily used natural sounds, such as cattle. This effect was facilitated by the outdoor shooting locations.

== Reception ==
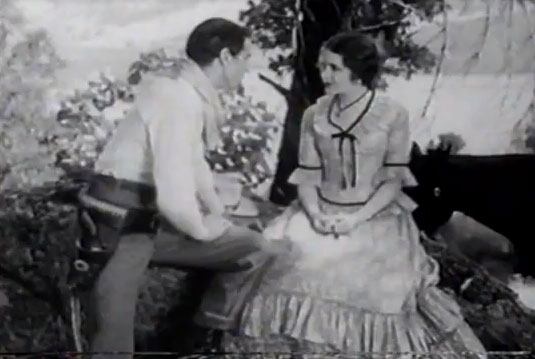
Gary Cooper and Mary Brian

The Virginian was released on November 9, 1929, with a theatrical rerelease in 1935. Bruce Eder, writing for Allmovie (a site run by the Rovi Corporation), notes that the film was a significant milestone in Cooper's career. According to the American Film Institute, The Virginian is "one of the first of the studio produced, large-scale, all-dialogue Westerns." However, as the main character has little dialogue, Cooper was typecast as a man of few words, described by film historian Lee Clark Mitchell as a "yup and nope" actor. Cooper later called it his favorite film.

The Virginian has been well received, with a 100% "fresh" rating on Rotten Tomatoes as of March 2012, based on five reviews. The review for Variety noted that the film mixed various aspects of previous Westerns. The review described the scene where The Virginian must send his comrades to certain death "one of the most harrowing and vivid sequences ever before the lenses". Eder praised the characterizations and use of sound, summarizing that the film was "a most worthwhile viewing experience". Film historian Colin Shindler notes that The Virginian, along with Cimarron, was one of the early Westerns to handle sound well. Film critic Emanuel Levy gives the film a B+, noting that Cooper showed moral conflict similar to his role in the later film High Noon (1952).

Due to poor maintenance, the only surviving copies of The Virginian by the 1960s were of poor audio and visual quality; Eder describes them as being "a chore to watch". The alternative for most audiences was to watch the 1946 adaptation. In the 1990s, the film was restored and became more widely available. Another adaptation of the novel, a television series, ran for nine seasons from 1962 to 1971. The film also shaped the view of cowboys as chivalrous, slow-talking yet tough characters.

The film is recognized by American Film Institute in these lists:

- 2003: AFI's 100 Years...100 Heroes & Villains:
- * The Virginian – nominated hero
- 2005: AFI's 100 Years...100 Movie Quotes:
- * The Virginian: "If you wanna call me that, smile." – nominated

== See also ==
- List of early sound feature films (1926–1929)
