= How Doth the Simple Spelling Bee =

1907 short story by Owen Wister

- First edition
- Author: Owen Wister
- Illustrator: Frederic Rodrigo Gruger
- Language: English
- Publisher: Macmillan
- Publication date: 1907
- Media type: Print
- ISBN: 978-1-103-90429-7

How Doth the Simple Spelling Bee is a short story by Owen Wister that was published in book form in 1907. It is a satire about spelling reform efforts of the time, which also humorously and in a good-natured manner pokes fun at academia in general, and the folly of typical professors' endeavors.

== Plot ==
The story's protagonist is Chickle University professor Masticator B. Fellow, and is about his efforts to enlist the story narrator's support for spelling reform. Fellow advocates spelling all English words in a simpler, phonetic manner in order to make spelling easier for children and foreigners. Debates quickly ensue regarding whose pronunciation should be considered standard for phonetic spelling.

The story then changes focus to a couple who are attending the convention for spelling reform. This couple is much more interested in their blossoming romance than they are spelling reform. The narrator finds the woman of this couple attractive, attempts to woo her, and a love triangle ensues, forming some basis of suspense for the plot. The book ends with neither Fellow's attempts at spelling reform nor the narrator's attempts to win a woman's esteem proving the least bit successful.

== Background ==
In August 1906, President Theodore Roosevelt ordered that all federal publications use revised spellings of 300 words based on the work of the Simplified Spelling Board. Wister's story lampooned the change with his story, implying that these spelling changes went too far.
