= Emma Ghent Curtis =

American writer, publisher, populist, and suffragist (1860–1918)

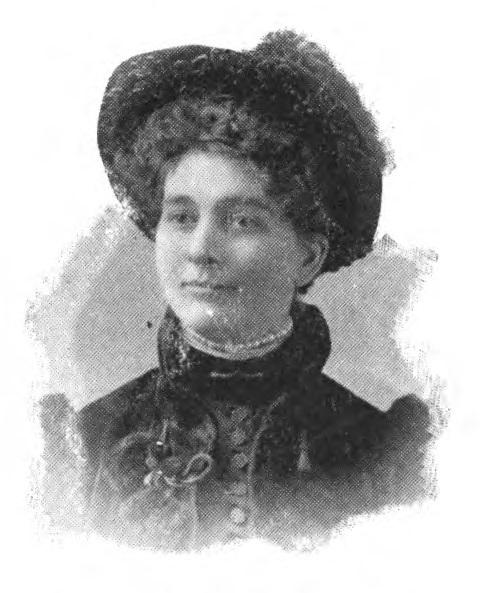
- Born: Emma Ghent; May 18, 1860; Frankfort, Indiana
- Died: February 9, 1918 (aged 57); Cañon City, Colorado
- Occupations: novelist; poet; suffragist
- Era: Progressive Era
- Notable work: The Administratrix (1889)
- Political party: People's Party
- Spouse: James Curtis (m. 1882)
- Children: 2

Emma Ghent Curtis (May 18, 1860 – February 9, 1918) was an American novelist, poet, newspaper publisher, Populist, and suffragist. Curtis published two Western novels in the late 1880s. The second of these, The Administratrix, is the first cowboy novel outside of the dime novel tradition, preceding Owen Wister's The Virginian by more than a decade. Curtis was instrumental in making women's suffrage part of the Populist platform.

== Early life and background ==
Emma Ghent was born to Ira Keith Ghent and Mary Palmer Ghent in 1860, in Frankfort, Indiana. Her father was a farmer. She graduated from Frankfort High School in 1877. Emma Ghent married James Curtis, a rancher, on January 2, 1882, in Cañon City, Colorado. The couple had two children.

== Career ==
=== Writing ===
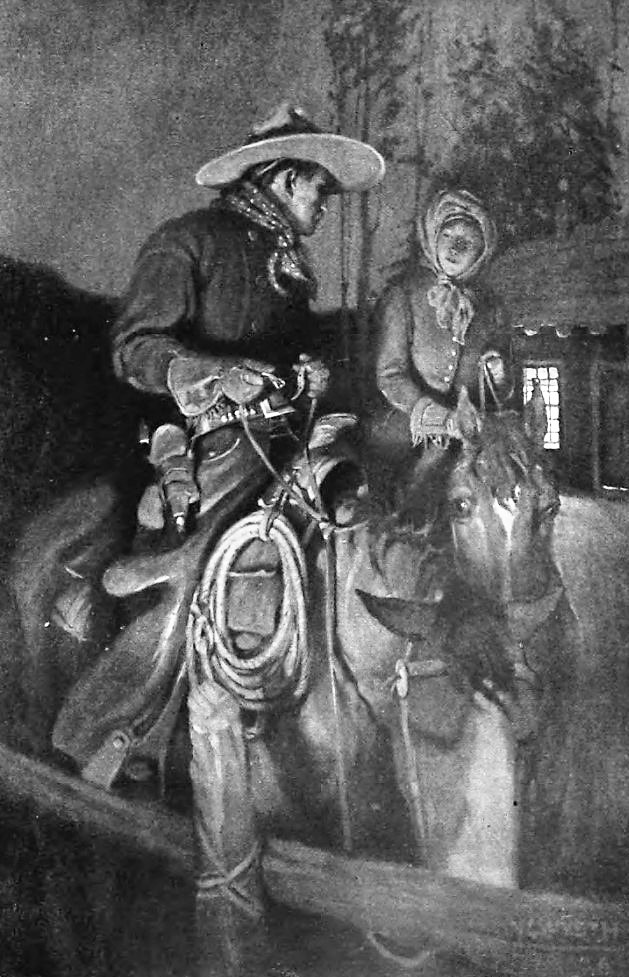
Illustration from Emma Ghent Curtis's "In the Dark of the Moon" by N. C. Wyeth

Curtis published her first novel, The Fate of a Fool, in 1888. Set in Colorado, the novel explores the negative effects of sex work on both men and women. Gessia, a music teacher, marries a handsome and well-off rancher, only to discover that he previously patronized the local brothel. The couple spend much of the novel arguing about the social ramifications of sex work. In the end, Gessia dies of exhaustion, full of shame regarding the "impurity" of her husband.

Curtis's second novel, The Administratrix, followed in 1889. Mary, the novel's protagonist, is a schoolteacher who moves from Indiana to Colorado. She falls in love with a cowboy named Jim, who is a vocal advocate for women's rights. When Jim is murdered, Mary crossdresses as a cowboy in order to find his killers and get revenge. This novel was the first outside of the dime novel tradition to feature a cowboy as the main character.

These would be Curtis's only two novels. She published a short story titled "In the Dark of the Moon" in a special issue of The Century Magazine celebrating Western writers, as well as many poems in magazines and newspapers. In her poetry, Curtis explored issues of women's and universal suffrage, including the hypocrisy she perceived in a black male activist's opposition to women's suffrage.

=== Educational administration ===
Curtis served on the Board of Control for the State Industrial School for Boys, a juvenile corrections facility located in Jefferson County, Colorado, from 1893 to 1896. The school was established by the state in 1881, and served to teach industrial skills like farming, masonry, blacksmithing, and printing to boys aged 7–16 who had been convicted of crimes. As a board member, Curtis signed the school's biennial reports, which detailed how allocated funds had been used and requests for additional funds for necessary improvements.

=== Populism and suffrage ===
Curtis was an active member of the People's Party and a labor suffragist who emphasized the importance of women union members' efforts in canvassing for the vote. She published a newspaper, The Royal Gorge, to promote women's suffrage. She attended Populist conventions in 1891 in Cincinnati and 1892 in St. Louis and Omaha as a delegate. At the Omaha convention, Curtis and other suffragists succeeded in making women's suffrage a part of the party's platform and in getting more women elected as party delegates. Curtis actively participated in the campaign for women's suffrage in Colorado; in 1893, the state became the first to grant women the right to vote by referendum. Curtis ran for Colorado state senator in 1894, and in 1898 she was chosen as the People's Party's nominee for Colorado Superintendent of Public Instruction.

== Death and legacy ==
Emma Ghent Curtis died in Cañon City, Colorado, on February 9, 1918.

In the 21st century, scholars of Western fiction have recognized Curtis as part of a tradition of women's Western writing. Victoria Lamont argues that the cowboy novel, previously thought to have started with Owen Wister's The Virginian, in fact began with Curtis's The Administratrix, published more than 10 years earlier.
