= The Virginian (1946 film) =

1946 film

- Theatrical release poster
- Directed by: Stuart Gilmore
- Written by: Howard Estabrook
- Screenplay by: Frances Goodrich; Albert Hackett
- Based on: The Virginian; 1902 novel by Owen Wister
- Produced by: Paul Jones
- Starring: Joel McCrea; Brian Donlevy; Sonny Tufts; Barbara Britton
- Cinematography: Harry Hallenberger
- Edited by: Everett Douglas
- Music by: Daniele Amfitheatrof
- Color process: Technicolor
- Production company: Paramount Pictures
- Distributed by: Paramount Pictures
- Release date: April 17, 1946
- Running time: 87 minutes
- Country: United States
- Language: English
- Box office: $3,350,000 (US rentals)

The Virginian is a 1946 American Western film directed by Stuart Gilmore and starring Joel McCrea, Brian Donlevy, Sonny Tufts, and Barbara Britton. Based on the 1902 Owen Wister novel of the same name, the film was adapted from the popular 1904 theatrical play Wister had collaborated on with playwright Kirke La Shelle. The Virginian is about an eastern school teacher who comes to Medicine Bow in Wyoming and encounters life on the frontier. The film is a remake of the 1929 movie with Gary Cooper and Walter Huston. There have been several versions of the story, beginning with a 1914 film directed by Cecil B. DeMille and including a 1960s television series that bore little relation to the book other than the title. The film was originally distributed by Paramount Pictures, and is currently owned by EMKA.

== Plot ==
In 1885, Molly Wood leaves the dull security of Vermont to be a schoolteacher in frontier Wyoming. On arrival, she is frightened by a spooked steer, and is rescued by the Virginian, only to discover the mild animal is a little girl's pet. She takes a strong dislike to the cowboy. He, on the other hand, is smitten with her. When Trampas voices scurrilous speculation as to why she came west, the Virginian forces him at gunpoint to take it back.

Mr. and Mrs. Taylor put Molly up in their old home. The Virginian starts courting her, initially against her will. Steve Andrews, a friend the Virginian has not seen in three years, is also interested in her. She eventually warms to the Virginian, but her feelings for him are not as strong or certain as his for her.

Families are being driven away by the depredations of cattle rustlers. The Virginian suspects Trampas is the ringleader, but has no proof. When he sees Steve becoming friendly to Trampas, he warns his easygoing friend to keep better company. When he catches Steve with one of Judge Henry's calves, applying Trampas's brand on the pretext of branding a "stray," the Virginian warns Steve to choose wisely what course he wants his life to take because he will not cover up any rustling activities.

Before setting out on a long cattle drive, the Virginian tells Molly she must decide by the time he returns whether they have a future together. On the trail, Trampas and his men start a stampede, using the distraction to steal a couple of hundred animals. The Virginian fears that Steve has been killed, but he in fact is working with Trampas.

Judge Henry, whose cattle were taken, persuades the Virginian to lead a posse. When they find the rustlers, one is killed when he tries to draw his gun, and two others surrender. The Virginian catches Steve as he is sneaking away; Steve says no one would know if his friend were to let him go, but the Virginian takes him back to join the others. Trampas gets away. The three rustlers are lynched.

The Virginian goes after Trampas and is shot in the back. Molly tends to him during months of recovery. When she learns that he had to hang his own friend, she decides to return east. Stagecoach driver Andy makes her see that she is in love with the Virginian. She finally agrees to marry the cowboy.

Just before their wedding, Trampas shows up to tell the Virginian to leave town by sundown or be shot on sight. Molly pleads with the Virginian to leave, but he has no choice. He arms himself with the revolver Steve had left him, and the two men stalk each other. Trampas spots the Virginian first, and is about to ambush him when he startles a horse. Thus warned, the Virginian kills Trampas. The Virginian and Molly ride off into the sunset.

== Cast ==
- Joel McCrea as The Virginian
- Brian Donlevy as Trampas
- Sonny Tufts as Steve Andrews
- Barbara Britton as Molly Wood
- Fay Bainter as Mrs. Taylor
- Tom Tully as Nebraska
- Henry O'Neill as Mr. Taylor
- Bill Edwards as Sam Bennett
- William Frawley as Honey Wiggen
- Paul Guilfoyle as "Shorty", one of the hanged rustlers
- Marc Lawrence as Pete
- Vince Barnett as "Baldy"
- Hank Bell as Rider (uncredited)
- Paul Hurst as The Bartender (uncredited)
- Minor Watson as Judge Henry (uncredited)
- James Burke as Stagecoach Driver Andy (uncredited)

== Production ==
=== Background ===
The basic plot elements of the film were inspired by the 1892 Johnson County War in Wyoming, the archetypal cattlemen-homesteaders conflict, which also served as the background for Shane and Heaven's Gate.

=== Filming locations ===
- Andy Jauregui Ranch, Placerita Canyon Road, Newhall, California, USA
- Kernville, California, USA
- Monogram Ranch, 24715 Oak Creek Avenue, Newhall, California, USA
- Paramount Ranch, 2813 Cornell Road, Agoura, California, USA

== Reception ==
The film grossed $98,000 in its first week at the Paramount Theatre in New York City.

It was the 27th highest-grossing film in the United States and Canada for the year with theatrical rentals of $3.35 million.
