= Done in the Open =

1902 verse collection by Owen Wister

First edition (publ. R.H. Russell)

Done in the Open was a verse collection published by in 1902 American author Owen Wister. The book was a collaboration with the artist Frederic Remington, the verses being written to accompany Remington's drawings.
