= Mother (short story) =

1907 short story by Owen Wister

- Standalone first edition
- Author: Owen Wister
- Illustrator: John Rae
- Language: English
- Publisher: Dodd, Mead
- Publication date: 1907
- Media type: Print
- ISBN: 978-1-4065-6429-7

Mother is a short story by Owen Wister that was written and published originally in an anthology titled A House Party: An Account of Stories Told at a Gathering of Famous American Authors, the Storytellers Being Introduced by Paul Leicester Ford. Wister republished his short story in book form in 1907, adding approximately 25 percent new material at the beginning in order to adequately introduce the story and replace the frame that was previously supplied by the anthology.

== Plot summary ==
The story is about a young couple living in New York who wish to marry, but must wait until their means are sufficient. The groom-to-be luckily inherits a large sum, and intends to invest it wisely in order to live off the income. However, under the influence of an unscrupulous financial advisor, he begins to lose a large portion of his money in dubious investments. His wife-to-be has a more objective view of the situation and offers sound advice. The plot draws its suspense from determining whether the advice given will work in time for the couple to be able to marry. This short story provides considerable insight into the financial and social interconnections predominant among the middle and upper classes in the quarter century that preceded the stock market crash of 1929.
