= Owen Wister =

American writer (1860–1938)

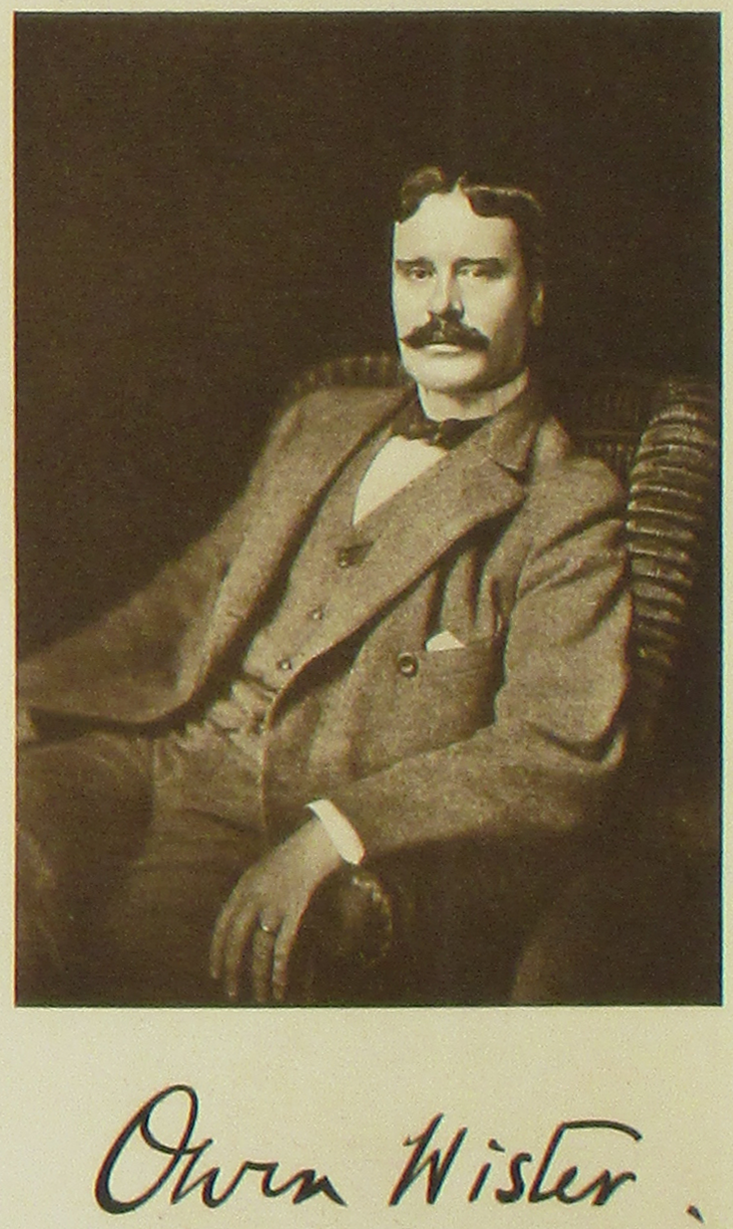
- Born: July 14, 1860; Germantown, Philadelphia, Pennsylvania, U.S.
- Died: July 21, 1938 (aged 78); Saunderstown, Rhode Island, U.S.
- Resting place: Laurel Hill Cemetery, East Falls, Philadelphia, Pennsylvania, U.S.
- Occupations: Author, attorney
- Spouse: Mary Channing
- Children: 6

Owen Wister (July 14, 1860 – July 21, 1938) was an American writer. His novel The Virginian, published in 1902, helped create the cowboy as a folk hero in the United States and built Wister's reputation as the "father of Western fiction." He was posthumously inducted into the Hall of Great Westerners by the National Cowboy & Western Heritage Museum and the Rhode Island Heritage Hall of Fame. The Western Writers of America renamed the Saddleman Award for best book of the year to the Owen Wister Award, and Mount Wister in Wyoming was named in his honor.

== Early life and education ==
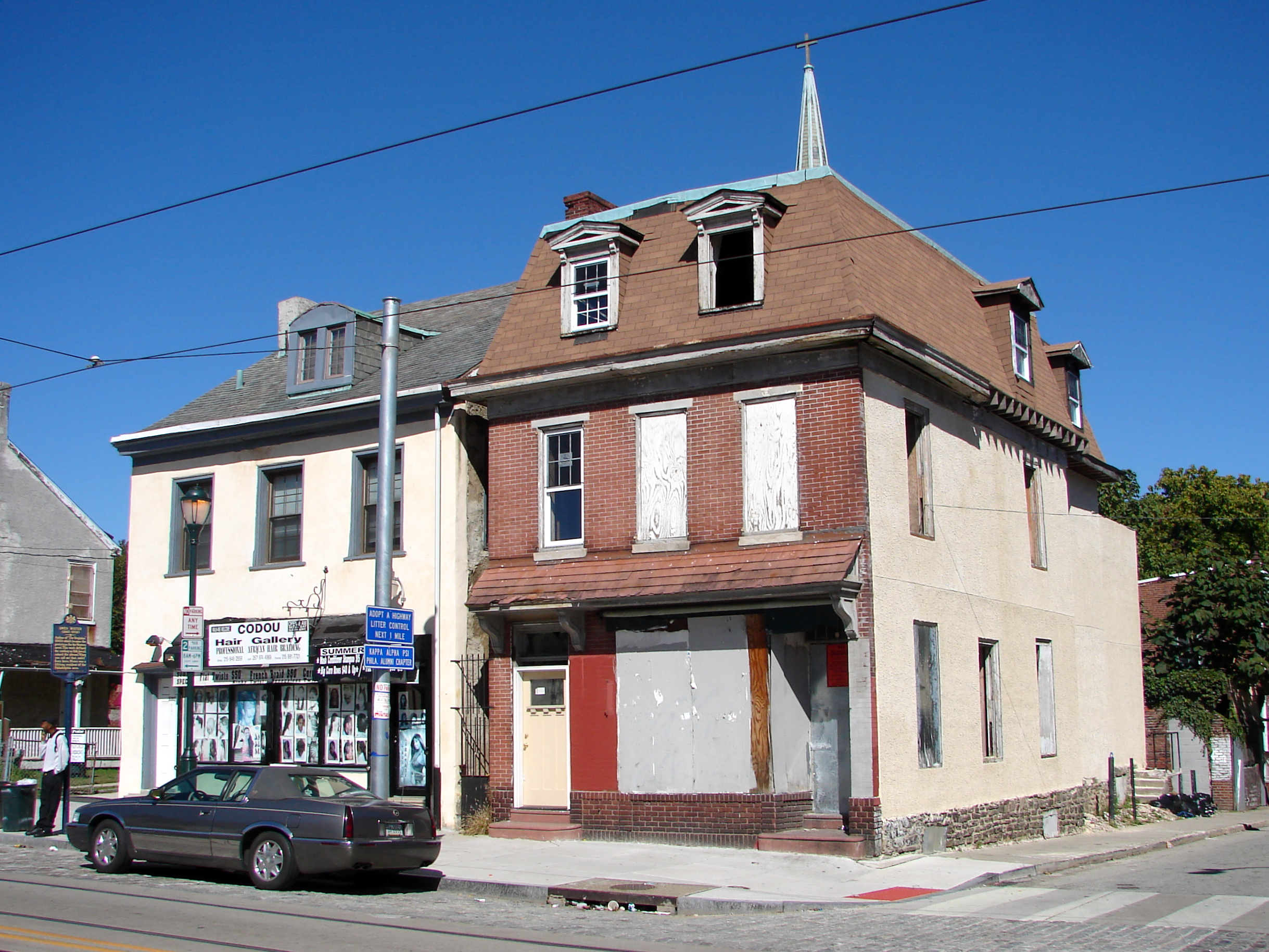
Wister's birthplace at 5203 Germantown Avenue, Philadelphia

Wister was born on July 14, 1860, in the Germantown neighborhood of Philadelphia, Pennsylvania. His father, Owen Jones Wister, was a wealthy physician raised at "Butler Place" which adjoined Belfied, the Wister family estate in Germantown. His mother, Sarah Butler Wister, was the daughter of Fanny Kemble, a British actress.

Wister attended boarding schools in Switzerland and Britain. He studied at St. Paul's School in Concord, New Hampshire, and entered Harvard University in Cambridge, Massachusetts, in 1878. He was a member of the Hasty Pudding Theatricals, and a member of Delta Kappa Epsilon (Alpha chapter). Wister was also a member of the Porcellian Club, through which he became friends with Theodore Roosevelt. As a senior, Wister wrote the Hasty Pudding's then most successful show, Dido and Aeneas, whose proceeds aided in the construction of their theater. Wister graduated summa cum laude from Harvard in 1882.

He studied for two years at a Paris conservatory and wrote six operas. They were never produced and he gave up his dream of a career in music. He worked briefly in a bank in New York before studying law; he graduated from Harvard Law School in 1888 and passed the bar in 1890. He practiced with a Philadelphia firm but was never truly interested in that career.

== Career ==
In 1882, Wister started his writing career with the publication of The New Swiss Family Robinson, which parodied the 1812 novel The Swiss Family Robinson. It was well received, and Mark Twain wrote a letter to Wister praising of the work.

Wister traveled to the American West to improve his health due to an illness that caused him hallucinations, headaches, and vertigo. In 1885, he was a guest of Frank Wolcott at the VR Ranch near Douglas, Wyoming, and became enchanted with the beauty of the West and the rough characters such as stage coach drivers, gamblers, cowboys, and soldiers he met.

In 1891, Wister began to write fictional stories of western life based on the people he met and the stories he heard. He traveled to the West for almost every summer over the next 15 years to gather additional material for his books. His most famous work was the 1902 novel The Virginian, a complex mixture of persons, places and events dramatized from experience, word of mouth, and his own imagination. The Virginian was a huge success and sold over 200,000 copies in its first year. The book is one of the top 50 best selling fictional works, has never been out of print, and has sold over 1.5 million copies.

The Virginian became a template for future Western literature with characters including the cowboy as hero, the innocent schoolteacher, hostile Native Americans, and devious villain. It is widely regarded as the first cowboy novel, though many modern scholars argue that this distinction belongs to Emma Ghent Curtis's The Administratrix, published over ten years earlier.

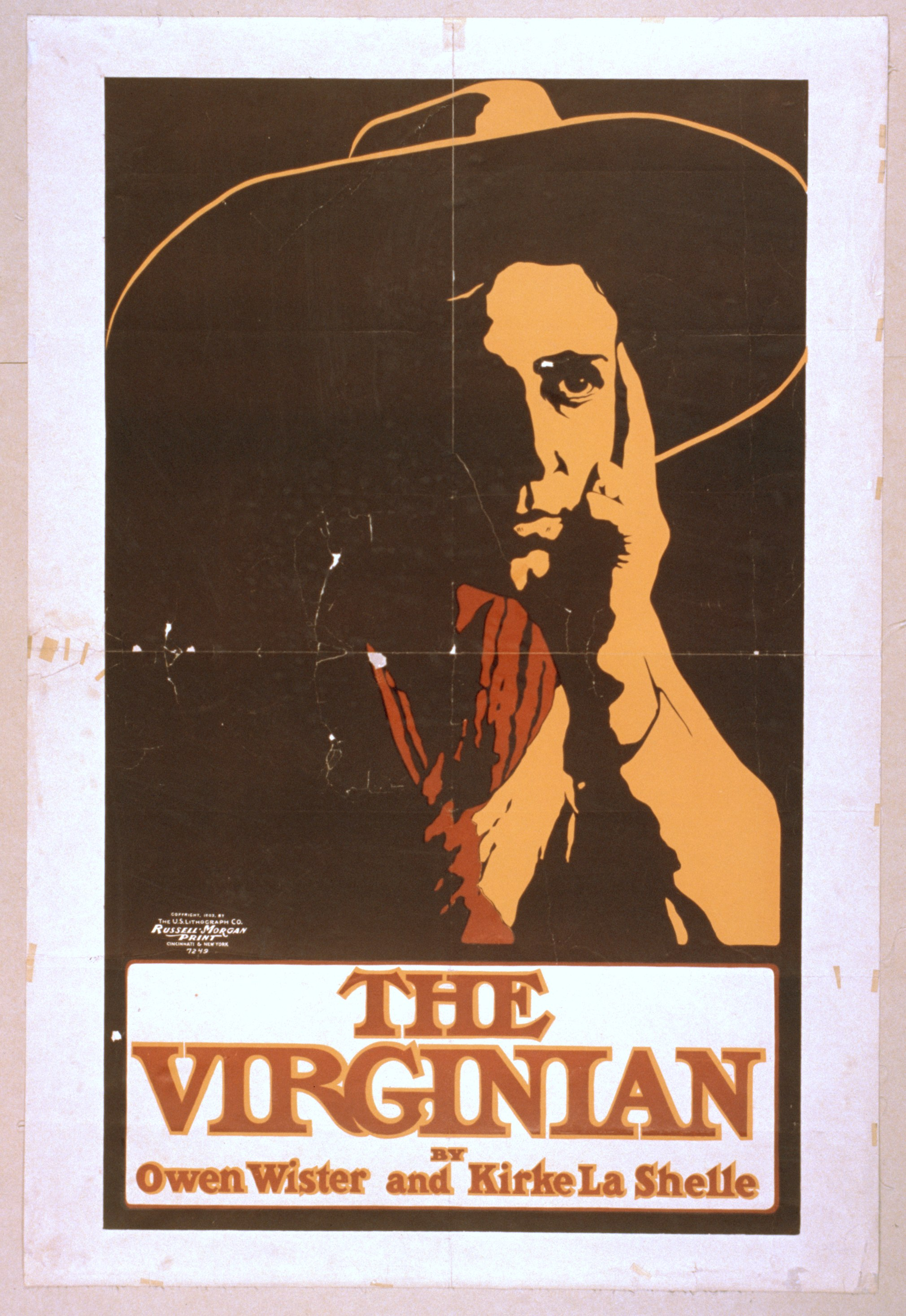
Poster for the Broadway production of The Virginian by Wister and Kirke La Shelle

In 1904, Wister collaborated with Kirke La Shelle on a successful stage adaptation of The Virginian that featured Dustin Farnum in the title role. Farnum reprised the role ten years later in Cecil B. DeMille's film adaptation of the play. The Virginian was the basis for five Western movies and was turned into a popular television show in the 1960s.

In 1906, Wister published the novel Lady Baltimore which was named after the Lady Baltimore cake served to him in Charleston, South Carolina. Wister was said to have been so enamored with the cake that he used it as the namesake of his novel. The owners of the Lady Baltimore Tea Room in Charleston sent Wister a cake each year as thanks for popularizing the dessert.

Wister moved away from writing Westerns, and his later work focused on biographies, including ones on Ulysses S. Grant, Theodore Roosevelt, and George Washington.

Wister was a member of several literary societies, a member of the Franklin Inn Club, a fellow of the American Academy of Arts and Sciences, and a member of the Board of Overseers of Harvard University. He was an associate member of the Boone and Crockett Club and an elected member of the American Philosophical Society.

== Personal life ==
In 1898, Wister married Mary Channing, his second cousin. The couple had six children. Mary died during childbirth in 1913. Their daughter, Mary Channing Wister, married artist Andrew Dasburg in 1933.

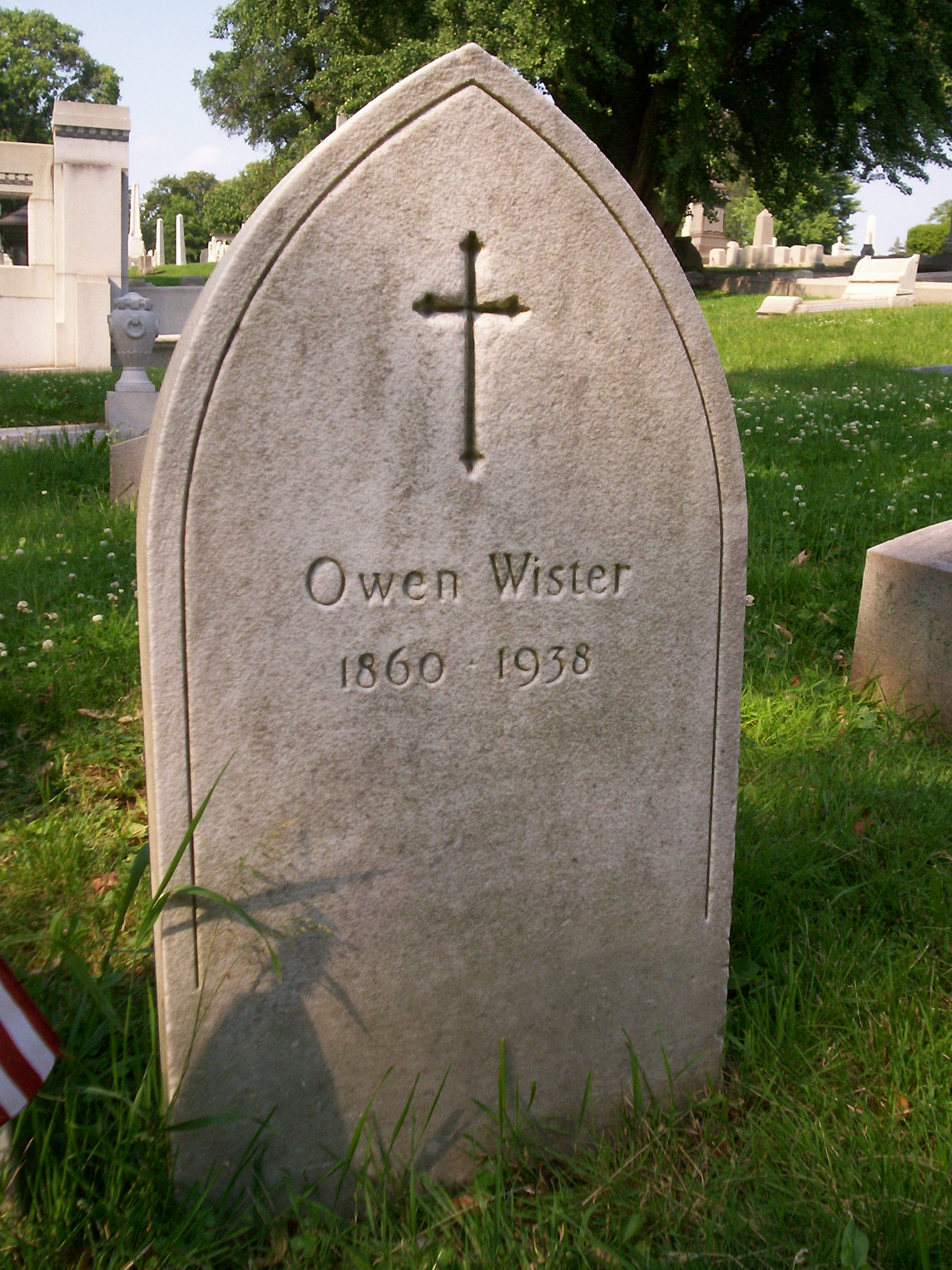
Grave of Owen Wister, Laurel Hill Cemetery

Wister built an estate in Saunderstown, Rhode Island, named Crowfield. He died there on July 21, 1938. He was interred in Laurel Hill Cemetery in Philadelphia.

== Legacy ==
In 1958, Wister's daughter, Fenny Kemble Wister, published his letters and journals in Owen Wister Out West.

In 1976, Wister was inducted into the Hall of Great Westerners of the National Cowboy & Western Heritage Museum.

His diaries of life in Wyoming are kept at the American Heritage Center at the University of Wyoming. Since 1978, the University of Wyoming Student Publications has published the literary and arts magazine Owen Wister Review. The magazine was published bi-annually until 1996 and became an annual publication in the spring of 1997.

In 1991, the Saddleman Award, given to the best book of the year by the Western Writers of America, was renamed the Owen Wister Award in his honor.

Mount Wister, just within the western boundary of the Grand Teton National Park in Wyoming, is named for him.

Near a house that Wister built near La Mesa, California, but never occupied due to his wife's death, is a street called Wister Drive. In the same neighborhood are Virginian Lane and Molly Woods Avenue (named for a character in The Virginian). All of those streets were named by Wister himself.

Wister was admitted into the Rhode Island Heritage Hall of Fame in 2010.

== Bibliography ==
=== Novels ===
- The New Swiss Family Robinson (1882)
- The Dragon of Wantley: His Tale (1892)
- Lin McLean (1897) (1918 filmed as A Woman's Fool by John Ford)
- The Virginian: A Horseman of the Plains (1902)
- Philosophy 4: A Story of Harvard University (1903)
- A Journey in Search of Christmas (1904)
- Lady Baltimore (1906)
- Padre Ignacio: or, the Song of Temptation (1911)
- Romney: And Other New Works about Philadelphia (written 1912–1915; published incomplete 2001)

=== Non-fiction ===
- In Memory of Thomas Wharton (introduction, pp.ix-xxii) to Bobbo and Other Fancies (1897) by Wharton, Thomas Isaac (1859–1896)
- Ulysses S. Grant (1901)
- Oliver Wendell Holmes, in the "American Men of Letters Series" (1902)
- Musk-Ox, Bison, Sheep, and Goat, with G. B. Grinnell and Caspar Whitney in the "American Sportsman's Library" (1903)
- Benjamin Franklin, in the "English Men of Letters Series" (1904)
- The Seven Ages of Washington: A Biography (1907)
- The Pentecost of Calamity (1915)
- The Aftermath of Battle: With the Red Cross in France (1916) (preface to Edward D. Toland's autobiography)
- A Straight Deal: or the Ancient Grudge (1920)
- Neighbors Henceforth (1922)
- A Monograph of the Work of Mellor Meigs & Howe (1923) (contributor)
- Roosevelt: The Story of a Friendship, 1880–1919 (1930)
- The Philadelphia Club, 1834–1934 (1934)
- The Illustrations of Frederic Remington (1970) (commentary)

=== Story collections ===
- Red Men and White (1895) (aka Salvation Gap and Other Western Classics)
- The Jimmyjohn Boss and Other Stories (1900)
- Members of the Family (1911) (Illus. H. T. Dunn)
- Safe in the Arms of Croesus (1927)
- When West Was West (1928)
- The West of Owen Wister: Selected Short Stories (1972)

=== Short stories ===
- "The New Swiss Family Robinson: A Tale for Children of All Ages", a parody of The Swiss Family Robinson (1882); new edition, 1922
- "Hank's Woman" (1892) (in The Jimmyjohn Boss)
- "How Lin McLean Went East" (1892) (incorporated into Lin McLean)
- "Em'ly" (1893) (incorporated into The Virginian)
- "The Winning of the Biscuit-Shooter" (1893) (incorporated into Lin McLean)
- "Balaam and Pedro" (1894) (incorporated into The Virginian)
- "The Promised Land" (1894) (in The Jimmyjohn Boss)
- "A Kinsman of Red Cloud" (1894) (in The Jimmyjohn Boss)
- "Little Big Horn Medicine" (1894) (in Red Men and White)
- "Specimen Jones" (1894) (in Red Men and White)
- "The Serenade at Siskiyou" (1894) (in Red Men and White)
- "The General's Bluff" (1894) (in Red Men and White)
- "Salvation Gap" (1894) (in Red Men and White)
- "Lin McLean's Honey-Moon" (1895) (incorporated into Lin McLean)
- "The Second Missouri Compromise" (1895) (in Red Men and White)
- "La Tinaja Bonita" (1895) (in Red Men and White)
- "A Pilgrim on the Gila" (1895) (in Red Men and White)
- "Where Fancy Was Bred" (1896) (incorporated into The Virginian)
- "Separ's Vigilante" (1897) (incorporated into Lin McLean)
- "Grandmother Stark" (1897) (incorporated into The Virginian)
- "Sharon's Choice" (1897) (in The Jimmyjohn Boss)
- "Destiny at Drybone" (1897) (incorporated into Lin McLean)
- "Twenty Minutes for Refreshments" (1900) (in The Jimmyjohn Boss)
- "Padre Ignazio" (1900) (in The Jimmyjohn Boss)
- "The Game and the Nation" (1900) (incorporated into The Virginian)
- "Mother" (1901, 1907) (in Safe in the Arms of Croesus)
- "Superstition Trail" (1901) (incorporated into The Virginian)
- "In a State of Sin" (1902) (incorporated into The Virginian)
- "The Vicious Circle" (1902) (in The Saturday Evening Post, December 13, 1902; later revised as Spit-Cat Creek)
- "With Malice Aforethought" (1902) (incorporated into The Virginian)
- "Stanwick's Business" (1904) (in Safe in the Arms of Croesus)
- "The Jimmyjohn Boss" (in The Jimmyjohn Boss)
- "Napoleon Shave-Tail" (in The Jimmyjohn Boss)
- "Happy Teeth" (in Members of the Family)
- "Spit-Cat Creek" (in Members of the Family)
- "In the Back" (in Members of the Family)
- "How Doth the Simple Spelling Bee" (1907) (Illus. Frederic Rodrigo Gruger) (in Safe in the Arms of Croesus)
- "Timberline" (1908) (in Members of the Family)
- "The Gift Horse" (1908) (in Members of the Family)
- "Extra Dry" (1909) (in Members of the Family)
- "Where It Was" (1911) (in Members of the Family)
- "The Drake Who Had Means of His Own" (1911) (in Members of the Family)
- "Safe in the Arms of Croesus" (in Safe in the Arms of Croesus)
- "With the Coin of Her Life" (in Safe in the Arms of Croesus)
- "The Honeymoonshiners" (in Safe in the Arms of Croesus)
- "Bad Medicine" (in When West Was West)
- "Captain Quid" (in When West Was West)
- "Once Round the Clock" (in When West Was West)
- "The Right Honorable, The Strawberries" (1928) (in When West Was West)
- "Little Old Scaffold" (1928) (in When West Was West)
- "Absalom of Moulting Pelican" (1928) (in When West Was West)
- "Lone Fountain" (in When West Was West)
- "Skip to My Loo" (in When West Was West)
- "At the Sign of the Last Chance" (1928) (in When West Was West)

=== Essays ===
- "Where Charity Begins" (1895)
- "The Evolution of the Cow-Puncher" (1895)
- "Concerning "Bad Men" The True "Bad Man" of the Frontier, and the Reasons for His Existence" (1901)
- "Theodore Roosevelt, Harvard '80" (1901)
- "The Open Air Education" (1902)
- "After Four Years" (1905)
- "High Speed English and American Railroad Flyers" (1906)
- "The Keystone Crime: Pennsylvania's Graft-Cankered Capitol" (1907)
- "According to a Passenger" (1919)
- "How One Bomb Was Made" (1921)
- "Roosevelt and the 1912 Disaster: A Friend Remembers - and Interprets" (1930)
- "Roosevelt and the War: A Chapter of Memories" (1930)
- "John Jay Chapman (Wister essay)|John Jay Chapman" (1934)
- "In Homage to Mark Twain" (1935)
- "Old Yellowstone Days" (1936)

=== Poetry ===
- "The Pale Cast of Thought" (1890)
- "From Beyond the Sea" (1890)
- "Autumn on Wind River" (1897)
- "In Memoriam" (1902)
- Done In The Open (1902) (Illus. by Frederic Remington)
- "Serenade" (1910)
- Indispensable Information for Infants: Or Easy Entrance to Education (1921)

=== Operas ===
- Dido and Aeneas (1892)
- Kenilworth (unpublished)
- Listen to Binks (unpublished)
- Montezuma (unpublished)
- Villon (unpublished)
- Watch Your Thirst: A Dry Opera in Three Acts (1923)

=== Plays ===
- The Virginian (1903) in collaboration with Kirke La Shelle
- The Dragon of Wantley
- The Honeymoonshiners
- Lin McLean
- Slaves of the Ring
- That Brings Luck

== Works inspired by The Virginian ==
- The Virginian (1914 film) directed by Cecil B. DeMille, with Dustin Farnum
- The Virginian (1923 film) with Kenneth Harlan and Florence Vidor
- The Virginian (1929 film) with Gary Cooper and Walter Huston
- The Virginian (1946 film) with Joel McCrea and Brian Donlevy
- The Virginian (1962–1971 TV series) with James Drury and Doug McClure
- The Virginian 2000 telefilm with Bill Pullman, Diane Lane, John Savage, Colm Feore, and Dennis Weaver
- The Virginian 2014 telefilm with Trace Adkins, Brendan Penny, Ron Perlman, and Victoria Pratt
