= Ulysses S. Grant (Wister biography) =

Biography of Ulysses S. Grant

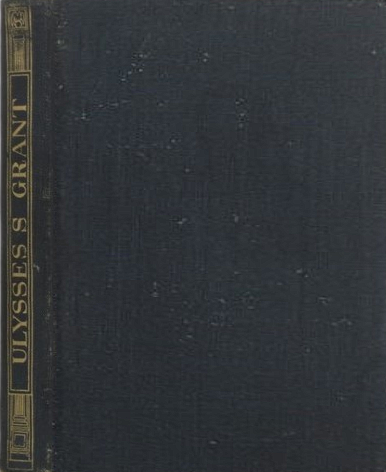
- Author: Owen Wister
- Language: English
- Genre: Biography
- Publisher: Small, Maynard & Company
- Publication date: 1900

Ulysses S. Grant is a 1900 book by Owen Wister. It is a biography of Ulysses S. Grant. It was written for the Beacon Biographies Series published by Small, Maynard & Company. Wister took on the book at the urging of his friend M. A. De Wolfe Howe.

In particular, Wister's biography points-up the remarkable contrast between Grant's life up to his thirty ninth year and the transition between a relatively uneventful and undistinguished life in a provincial town to the achievement of the status of one of the most significant military generals and politicians in history. A similar contrast is then explored between the scandals that engulfed Grant's Presidency on the one hand and the rise and resurgence of his reputation on a posthumous basis. Another theme is the accidental nature of Grant's career-path and decision-making and the way in which his life was almost devoid of planning, a key element in the relationship between Grant's personality on the one hand and his achievements in public life on the other.

Wister closely follows the primary source Personal Memoirs written by Grant and published by Mark Twain's publishing house.

== See also ==
- Bibliography of Ulysses S. Grant
