= Roosevelt: The Story of a Friendship =

Biography of Theodore Roosevelt by Owen Wister

- Author: Owen Wister
- Genre: Biography
- Publisher: Macmillan
- Publication date: 1930

Roosevelt: The Story of a Friendship is a biography by Owen Wister, depicting his long acquaintance with Theodore Roosevelt, a Harvard classmate. It was published in 1930.
