= The Virginian (1923 film) =

1923 film

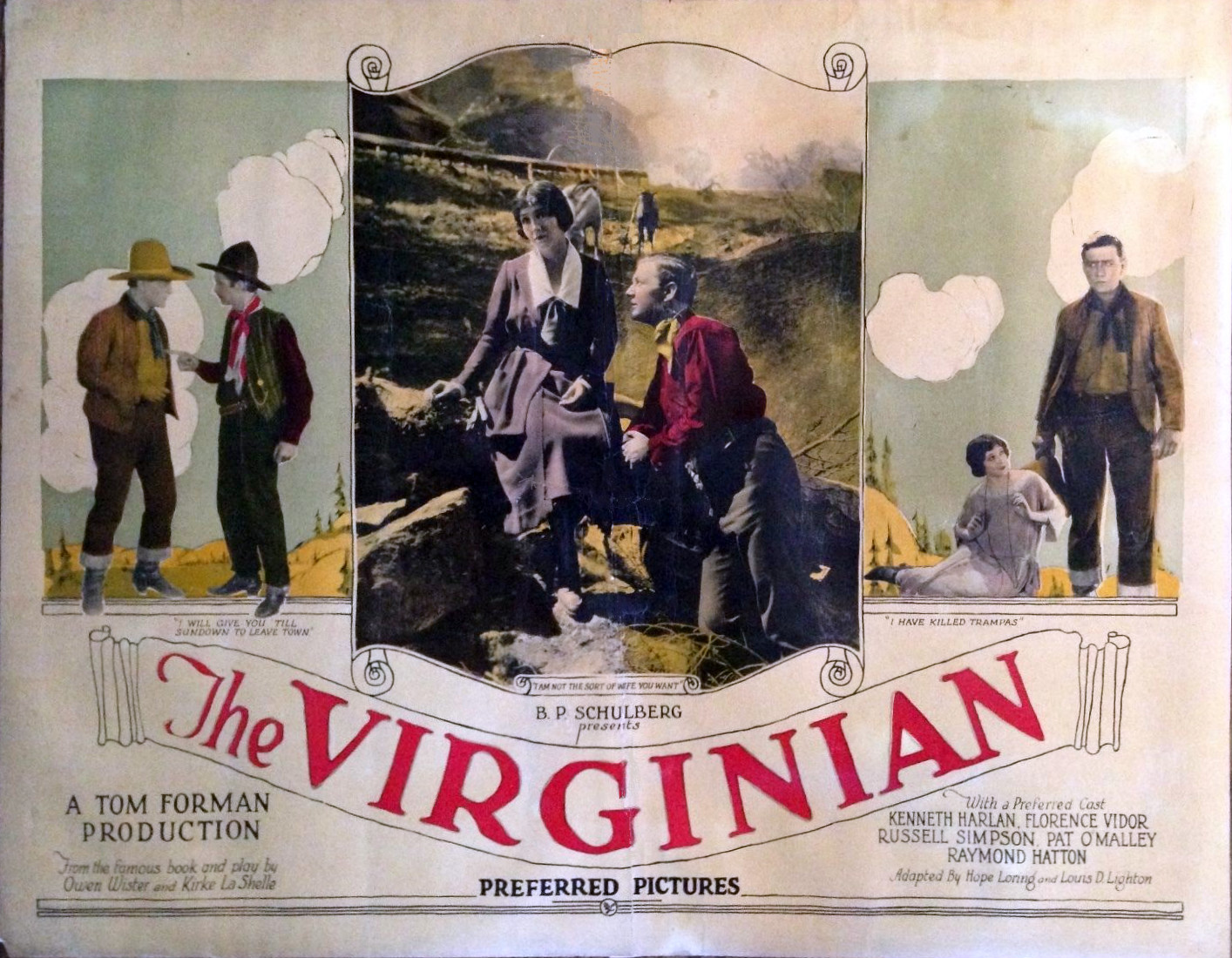
- Lobby card
- Directed by: Tom Forman
- Based on: The Virginian by Owen Wister
- Produced by: B. P. Schulberg
- Starring: Kenneth Harlan; Russell Simpson
- Distributed by: Preferred Pictures
- Release date: September 30, 1923
- Running time: 8 reels at 7,280 feet
- Country: United States
- Languages: Silent film English intertitles

The Virginian is a 1923 American silent Western film based upon the 1902 Owen Wister novel The Virginian and adapted from the popular 1904 theatrical play which Wister had collaborated on with playwright Kirke La Shelle. The film stars Kenneth Harlan as the Virginian and Russell Simpson as Trampas and was directed by Tom Forman. With the advent of talkies, the film was soon overshadowed by the 1929 motion picture The Virginian with Gary Cooper and Walter Huston.

== Cast ==
- Kenneth Harlan as The Virginian
- Florence Vidor as Molly Woods
- Russell Simpson as Trampas
- Pat O'Malley as Steve
- Raymond Hatton as "Shorty"
- Milton Ross as Judge Henry
- Sam Allen as Uncle Hughey

== Production ==
The Virginian was partially filmed on location at Lone Pine, California. While filming on the constructed town set, 7 miles outside of Los Angeles, Kenneth Harlan accidentally shot himself in the thigh when his gun caught in the holster. Harlan collapsed but was not seriously injured, shooting was delayed until he recovered enough to finish filming.
