= The Virginian (novel) =

1902 Wild West novel by Owen Wister

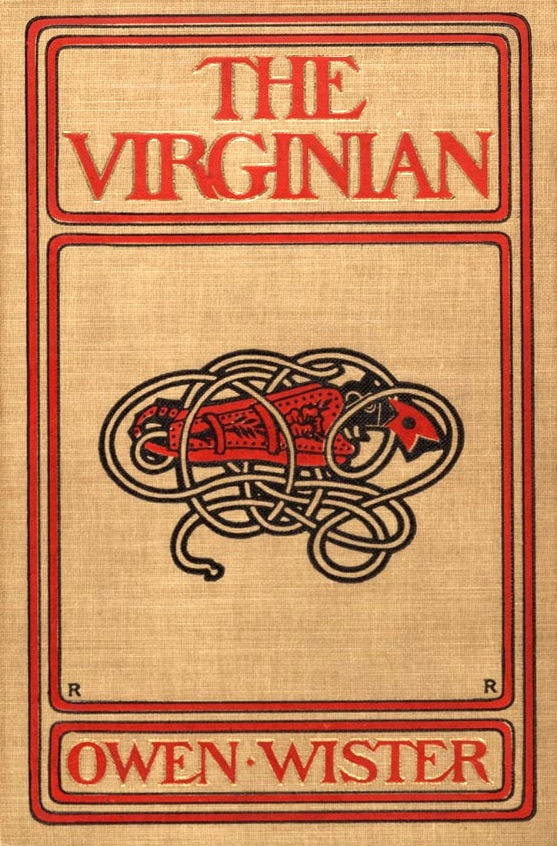
- First edition cover
- Author: Owen Wister (1860–1938)
- Original title: The Virginian
- Language: English
- Genre: Western
- Publisher: Macmillan
- Publication date: 1902
- Publication place: United States
- Media type: Print (hardback & paperback)
- OCLC: 65699996
- Text: The Virginian at Wikisource

The Virginian: A Horseman of the Plains is a 1902 Wild West and cowboy novel by American author Owen Wister, set in Wyoming Territory during the 1880s. Detailing the life of a cowboy on a cattle ranch, the novel was a landmark in the evolution of the Western genre, as distinguished from earlier short stories and pulp dime novels. The Virginian paved the way for westerns by authors such as Zane Grey, Max Brand, Louis L'Amour, and others. The novel was adapted from several short stories published in Harper's Magazine and The Saturday Evening Post between November 1893 and May 1902.

== Fictional character ==
The Virginian is a ranch hand at the Sunk Creek Ranch, located outside of Medicine Bow, Wyoming. His friend Steve calls him "Jeff" presumably after Jefferson Davis, but he is always referred to as the Virginian, and no name is mentioned throughout the story. He is described as a tall, dark, slim, young giant, showing personality traits such as humility, kindness, valor, and chivalry. At first, he is only a cowboy, but halfway through the book, he is signed on as the full-time foreman. He is Judge Henry's most trusted worker. Several times throughout the book, he is offered the chance to run down his enemy, Trampas, behind his back, but each time he refuses the temptation, until Trampas challenges the Virginian to a duel. It is made clear that he will not use his official position as foreman to oppress any of his employees. One of the main plots is the Virginian's ongoing romance with the newly appointed "schoolmarm" of Bear Creek School, Miss Molly Stark Wood. Being from the East, she is not used to the wild West, and the Virginian is a perfect gentleman to her, intending to make her "love him before we get through."

== Plot summary ==
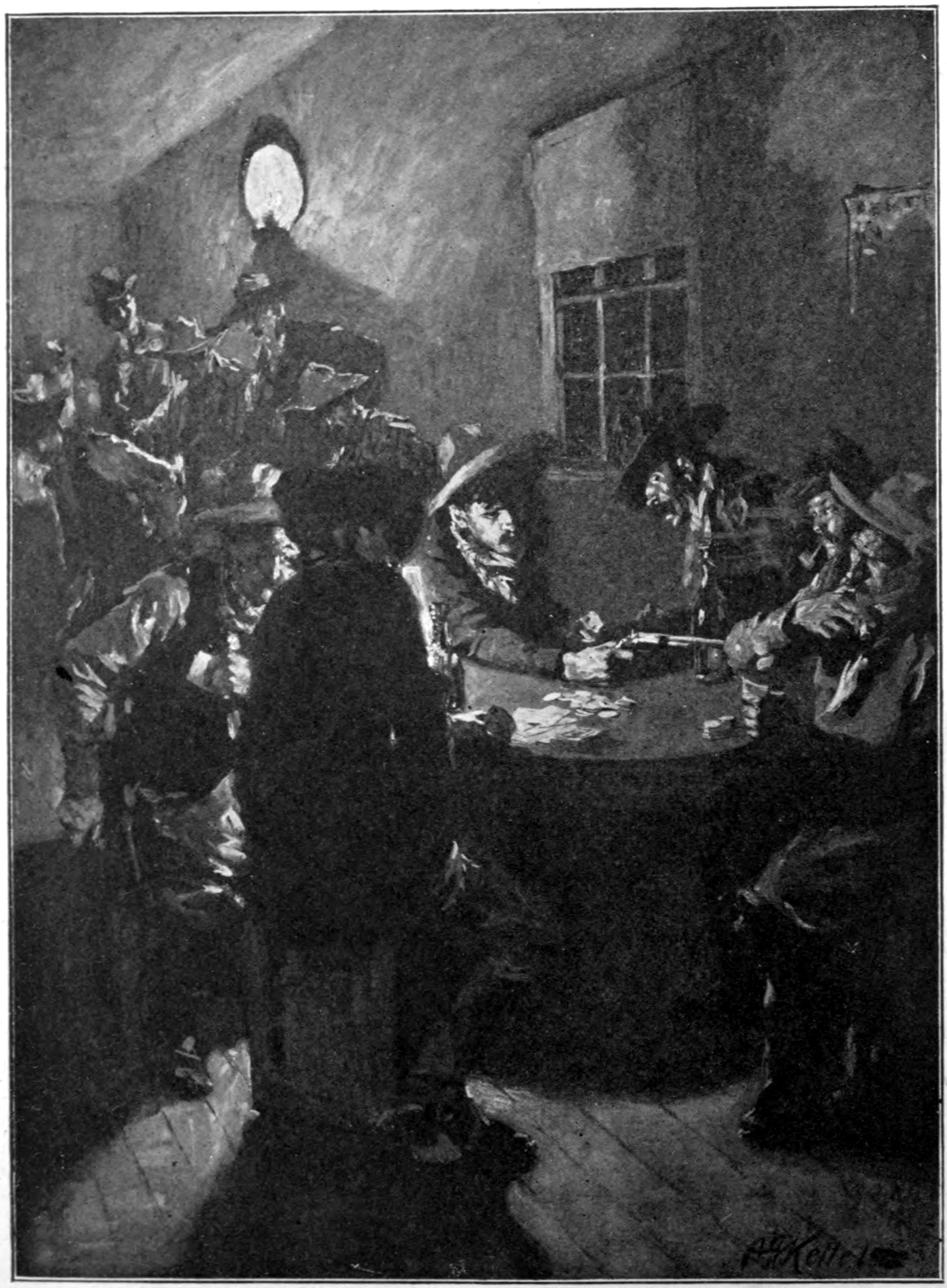
"When you call me that, smile!"

The novel begins with an unnamed narrator's arrival in Medicine Bow, Wyoming, from "back East" and his encounter with an impressively tall and handsome stranger. The stranger proves adept at roping horses, as well as facing down a gambler, Trampas, who calls him a "son of a bitch" after losing at cards. The stranger lays his pistol on the table and gently threatens, "When you call me that, smile!"

Known only as "the Virginian", the stranger turns out to be the narrator's escort to Judge Henry's ranch in Sunk Creek, Wyoming. As the two travel the 263 miles (423 km) to the ranch, the narrator, who is nicknamed “the Tenderfoot", and the Virginian come to know one another as the Tenderfoot slowly begins to understand the nature of life in the West, which is very different from what he expected. This meeting is the beginning of a lifelong friendship and the starting point of the narrator's recounting of key episodes in the life of the Virginian.

The novel revolves around the Virginian and the life he lives. As well as describing the Virginian's conflict with his enemy, Trampas, and his romance with the pretty schoolteacher Molly Stark Wood, Wister weaves a tale of action, violence, hate, revenge, love, and friendship. In one scene, the Virginian is forced to participate in the hanging of Steve, an admitted cattle thief who had been his close friend. The hanging is represented as a necessary response to the government's corruption and lack of action, but the Virginian feels it to be a horrible duty. He is especially stricken by the bravery with which the thief faces his fate, and the heavy burden that the act places on his heart forms the emotional core of the story.

A fatal shootout resolves the ongoing conflict with Trampas after five years of hate. After Trampas cheats in a duel, the Virginian shoots Trampas in self-defense and takes his leave of the ranch. The Virginian and Molly then ride off together to spend a month in the mountains before journeying back East to Vermont to meet her family. They are received a bit stiffly by the immediate Wood family, but warmly by Molly's great-aunt. The new couple returns to Wyoming, and the Virginian is made a partner of Judge Henry's ranch. The book ends noting that the Virginian became an important man in the territory with a happy family.

Although fiction, the novel's story was based on real events, such as the Johnson County War.

== Cultural influence ==
The 1902 novel had an enormous influence on publishing, and later movies and television, establishing the Western genre and especially the cowboy ideal as an American icon. Its climactic gun duel is the first "showdown" in fiction.

The novel is also the first known use of the phrase: "When you call me that, smile!" This line, in many versions, became common in later Western works, from movies to music.

Twenty-first century scholars of Western fiction debate whether The Virginian should be considered as the first cowboy novel outside the dime novel tradition. Victoria Lamont, for example, argues that this distinction belongs to The Administratrix by Emma Ghent Curtis (John B. Alden Publishing, 1889), which was published thirteen years earlier. However, The Administratrix did not command the breadth of popular appeal of The Virginian.

== Adaptations ==
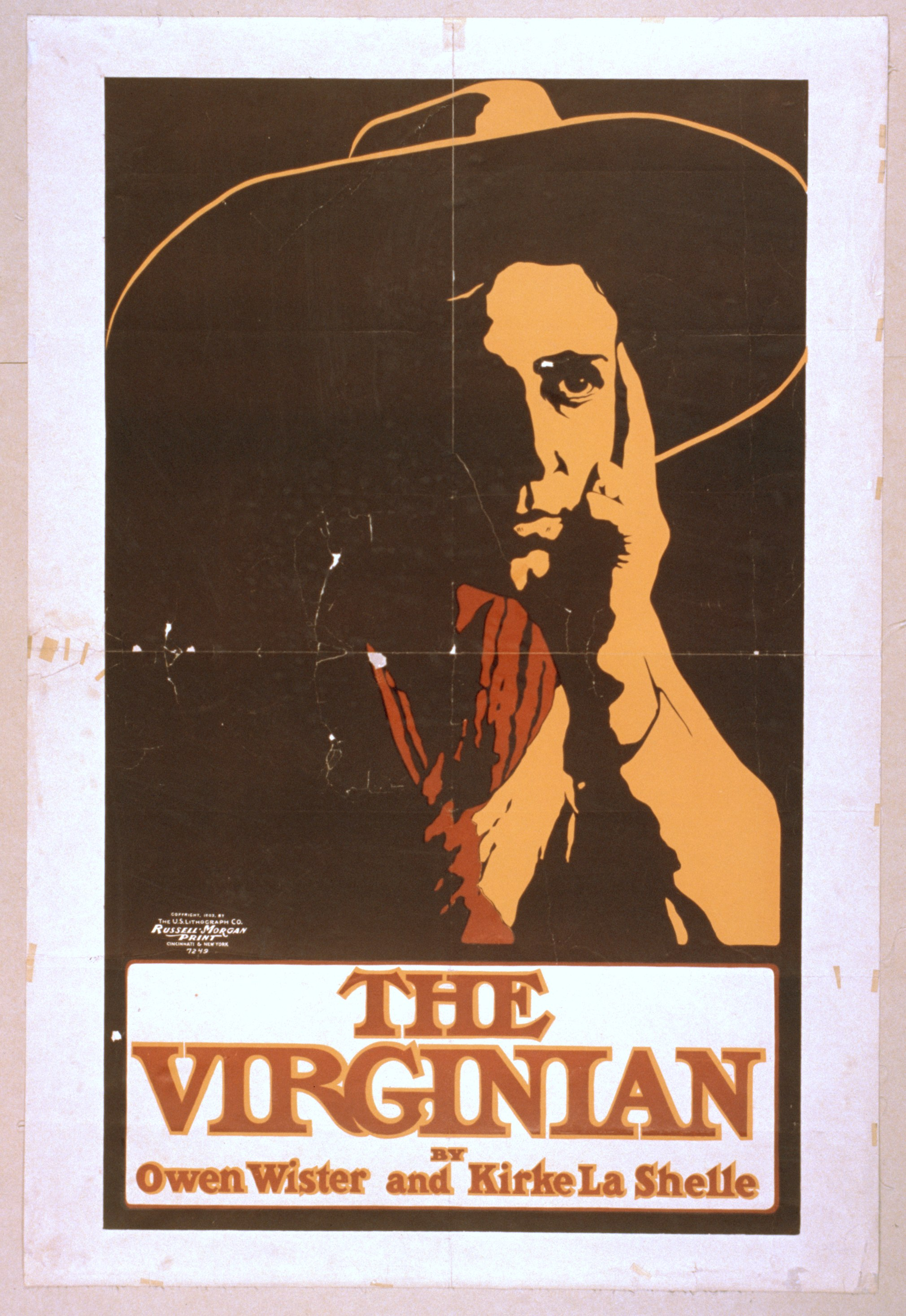
Poster for the Broadway production of The Virginian, adapted by Wister and Kirke La Shelle (1904)

=== Stage ===
Wister and Kirke La Shelle adapted the novel for a stage production. The Virginian opened at the Manhattan Theatre on January 5, 1904, and ran until May 1904. It was reprised in October 1905 for 16 performances at the Academy of Music in New York City.

In 2022 playwrights L.C Bernadine and Spencer Huffman newly adapted the novel for City Lit Theater in Chicago. The production opened on January 16, 2022 for a five-week run.

=== Films ===
- The Virginian (1914 film) directed by Cecil B. DeMille, with Dustin Farnum
- The Virginian (1923 film) with Kenneth Harlan and Florence Vidor
- The Virginian (1929 film) with Gary Cooper and Walter Huston
- The Virginian (1946 film) with Joel McCrea and Brian Donlevy
- The Virginian (2014 film) with Trace Adkins and Victoria Pratt

=== Television ===
- The novel was loosely adapted for the NBC TV series The Virginian (1962–1971).
- The Virginian (2000 TV film) with Bill Pullman and Diane Lane

=== Comics ===
The novel was adapted into comic form in Classics Illustrated #150. In 1963, Gold Key Comics published a single-issue tie-in with the television series.
