= The Virginian (1914 film) =

1914 film

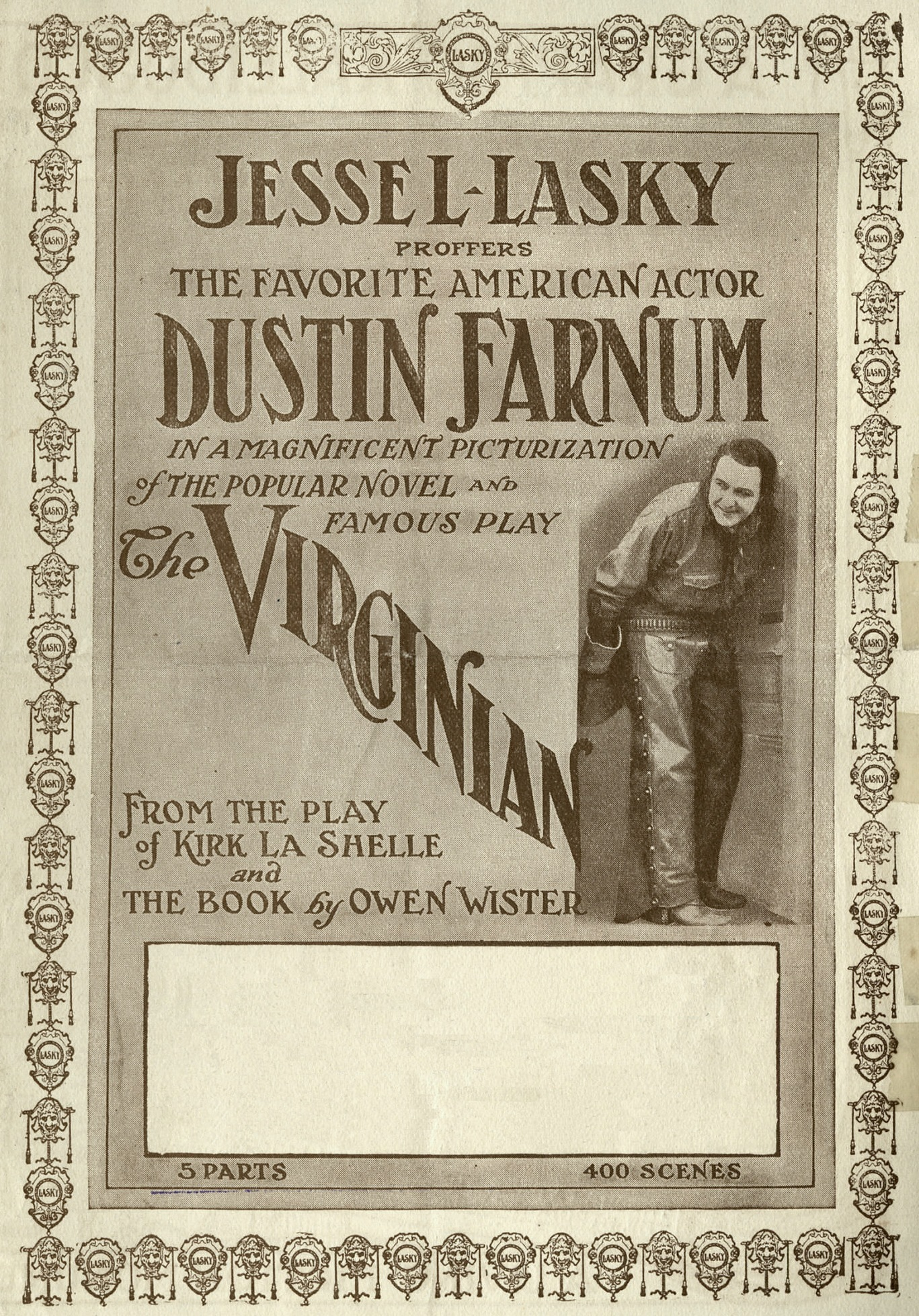
- Theatrical release poster
- Directed by: Cecil B. DeMille
- Based on: The Virginian by Owen Wister
- Produced by: Jesse L. Lasky
- Starring: Dustin Farnum
- Cinematography: Alvin Wyckoff
- Edited by: Cecil B. DeMille; Mamie Wagner
- Production company: Jesse Lasky Feature Plays
- Distributed by: Paramount Pictures
- Release date: September 7, 1914
- Running time: 55 minutes
- Country: United States
- Languages: Silent; English intertitles

The Virginian

The Virginian is a 1914 American silent Western film based on the 1902 novel The Virginian by Owen Wister. The film was adapted from the successful 1903–04 theatre play The Virginian, on which Wister had collaborated with playwright Kirke La Shelle. The Virginian starred Dustin Farnum in the title role, a role he reprised from the original play. It was directed by Cecil B. DeMille.

== Cast ==
- Dustin Farnum as The Virginian
- Horace B. Carpenter as Spanish Ed (uncredited)
- Sydney Deane as Uncle Hughey (uncredited)
- Cecilia de Mille as Little Girl (uncredited)
- Tex Driscoll as Shorty (uncredited)
- William Elmer as Trampas (uncredited)
- James Griswold as Stage Driver (uncredited)
- Jack W. Johnston as Steve (uncredited)
- Anita King as Mrs. Ogden (uncredited)
- Winifred Kingston as Molly Wood (uncredited)
- Dick La Reno as Balaam (uncredited)
- Mrs. Lewis McCord as Mrs. Balaam (uncredited)
- Monroe Salisbury as Mr. Ogden (uncredited)
- Russell Simpson as (uncredited)
- Hosea Steelman as Lin McLean (uncredited)

== Production ==
The film was an attempt to reproduce the success of The Squaw Man, using the same formula.
